= Love Me or Leave Me (Donaldson and Kahn song) =

1928 popular song by Ruth Etting

Song by Ruth Etting
- Published: 1928 by Donaldson, Douglas & Gumble
- Released: 1928
- Genre: Vaudeville
- Length: 3:23
- Label: Columbia Records
- Songwriters: Walter Donaldson, Gus Kahn

"Love Me or Leave Me" is a popular song written in 1928 by Walter Donaldson with lyrics by Gus Kahn. The song was introduced in the Broadway musical comedy Whoopee!, which opened in December 1928. Ruth Etting's performance of the song was so popular that she was also given the song to sing in the play Simple Simon, which opened in February 1930.

== Recorded versions ==
=== Major recorded versions ===
"Love Me or Leave Me"
1928 recording featuring Ruth Etting

The original version of the song, the biggest-selling at the time, was recorded by Ruth Etting on December 17, 1928. It was issued by Columbia Records as catalog number 1680-D, with the flip side "I'm Bringing a Red, Red Rose", another Donaldson/Kahn composition. The song reached #2 on the charts in 1929.

Other versions that also enjoyed popularity at this time were by Guy Lombardo's Royal Canadians, with a vocal by Carmen Lombardo (recorded March 20, 1929, released by Columbia Records as catalog number 1782D, with the flip side "I'm Still Caring") and by Leo Reisman and his orchestra (recorded April 22, 1929, released by Victor Records as catalog number 21966A, with the flip side "Sweet Chewaulka, Land of Sleepy Water").

A recording made on December 24, 1947, by Bing Crosby and John Scott Trotter's orchestra was released in 1951 by Decca Records as catalog number 27667.

As the song was considered to be one of Etting's biggest hits, its title was chosen for the 1955 biographical movie about her life, in which Doris Day played Etting. Day's recording of the song, from the soundtrack, became a major hit for her. The same year, Sammy Davis Jr. and Lena Horne also experienced success with their versions of the song.

Davis's version was released by Decca Records as catalog number 29484, with the flip side "Something's Gotta Give". It first reached the Billboard magazine charts on May 28, 1955, and lasted 12 weeks on the chart. On the Disk Jockey chart, it peaked at #20; on the Best Seller chart, at #12. (However, another source gives the highest position as #9, but lists this as a position for the combined two sides of the record, "Love Me or Leave Me" and "Something's Gotta Give.")

Horne's was released by RCA Victor Records as catalog number 20-6073. It reached the Billboard magazine Disk Jockey chart on July 9, 1955, its only week on the chart, at #19. In the United Kingdom, it was released 1955 by His Master's Voice as catalog number B-309 (78 rpm) and 7M-309 (45 rpm),. Both releases were with the flip side "I Love To Love".

Singer/pianist/songwriter Nina Simone also recorded the song on her debut album Little Girl Blue (1958) and on Let It All Out (1966). The version was released as a single in 1959 by Bethlehem Records as catalog number 11021 and by Australian Parlophone Records as catalog number A-8008, with the flip side "I Loves You Porgy". It includes a solo in the style of J.S. Bach's Inventions.

Ella Fitzgerald included her rendition on her 1962 Verve release Ella Swings Brightly with Nelson, which won a Grammy Award in 1963.

=== Other recorded versions ===
- The Badgers (released by Broadway Records as catalog number 1285, with the flip side "Rainbow Man")
- Earl Burtnett's Biltmore Trio (recorded April 1, 1929, released by Brunswick Records as catalog number 4336, with the flip side "A Garden in the Rain")
- Chick Endor with Leonard Joy (recorded March 20, 1929, released by Victor Records as catalog number 21922, with the flip side "Good Little, Bad Little You")
- Sammy Fain (recorded February 6, 1929, released by Harmony Records as catalog number 843-H, with the flip side "Wedding Bells")
- Virginia Lee (recorded February 16, 1929, released by Gennett Records as catalog number 6773, with the flip side "That's the Good Old Sunny South")
- Majestic Dance Orchestra (H. Salter, leader) (vocal: A. Lawrence; recorded April 1929, released by Pathé Records as catalog number 36978 and by Perfect Records as catalog number 15159, both with the flip side "I'm Just a Vagabond Lover")
- Bob Haring and his orchestra (recorded April 15, 1929, released by Brunswick Records as catalog number 4342, with the flip side "My Sin")
- Jimmie Noone's Apex Club Orchestra (recorded April 27, 1929, released by Supertone Records as catalog number 2254 and by Vocalion Records as catalog number 1272, both with the flip side "Wake Up, Chill'un, Wake Up")
- John Vincent's Californians (recorded June 3, 1929, released by Conqueror Records as catalog number 7369, with the flip side "Ol' Man River")
- Lee Sims (piano solo; recorded June 1929, released by Brunswick Records as catalog number 4422, with the flip side "Lover, Come Back to Me!")
- Sam Lanin's Dance Orchestra (recorded June 3, 1929, released by Banner Records as catalog number 6410, with the flip side "Sure Enough Blues", and by Domino Records (1924) as catalog number 4350 and Regal Records as catalog number 8805, both with the flip side "Ol' Man River"; also released under the name Miami Society Orchestra by Oriole Records as catalog number 1604, with the flip side "Not for a Day but Forever" and by Jewel Records as catalog number 5628, with the flip side "Sure Enough Blues"; also released under the name Mills Merry Makers by Lincoln Records as catalog number 3168 and by Romeo Records as catalog number 943, both with the flip side "I'm Lonely Since You Went Away")
- Thomas "Fats" Waller (piano solo; recorded August 2, 1929, released by Bluebird Records as catalog number 10263, with the flip side "Valentine Stomp" and by Victor Records as catalog number 22092, with the flip side "I've Got a Feeling I'm Falling")
- Benny Goodman and his orchestra (recorded December 18, 1933, released by Columbia Records as catalog number 2871-D, with the flip side "Why Couldn't It Be Poor Little Me?"; re-recorded August 21, 1936, released by Victor Records as catalog number 25406, with the flip side "Exactly Like You")
- Bill Staffon and his orchestra (recorded August 1, 1935, released by Bluebird Records as catalog number 6082, with the flip side "White Star of Sigma Nu")
- Dixieland Swingsters (recorded August 2, 1937, released by Bluebird Records as catalog number 7160, with the flip side "Fiddleobia")
- Edgar Hayes Quintet (recorded September 7, 1937, released by Decca Records as catalog number 1444, with the flip side "So Rare")
- Teddy Grace (recorded September 1, 1938, released by Decca Records as catalog number 2050B, with the flip side "Crazy Blues")
- Billie Holiday (recorded August 7, 1941, released by OKeh Records as catalog number 6369, with the flip side "Jim")
- Henry Levin's Dixieland Octet (recorded August 11, 1941, released by Bluebird Records as catalog number 11278, with the flip side "All Alone")
- Eddie Heywood and his orchestra (recorded February 26, 1944, released by Commodore Records as catalog numbers 577A and 7524, both with the flip side "I Can't Believe that You're in Love with Me")
- Frances Langford with Earle Hogen (recorded June 1946, released by Mercury Records as catalog number 3029B, with the flip side "That Wonderful Worrisome Feeling")
- Mel and Stan (recorded September 1947, released by Majestic Records as catalog number 11030, with the flip side "Mother's Only Sleeping")
- Hazel Scott (recorded October 1947, released by Columbia Records as catalog number 37996, with the flip side "Soon")
- Pat Flowers (released by RCA Victor Records as catalog number 20-2930, with the flip side "Shoe Shine Shuffle")
- Ted Weems and his orchestra (vocal: Snooky Lanson; recorded March 1949, released by Mercury Records as catalog number 5305, with the flip side "Sleepy Hollow")
- Anita O'Day recorded a version with the Oscar Peterson Quartet on January 31, 1957, as part of the album Anita Sings the Most. Released by Verve
- Jimmie Osborne (released in 1951 by King Records as catalog number 1012, with the flip side "It's Me Who Has To Suffer")
- Erroll Garner (piano solo; recorded February 29, 1952, released by Columbia Records as catalog number 39749, with the flip side "With Every Breath I Take")
- Ella Mae Morse (released by Capitol Records in 1952 as catalog number 1922, with the flip side "Blacksmith Blues")
- Gerry Mulligan recorded a version with Chet Baker in 1953 released by Pacific Jazz
- Peggy Lee recorded a version on her album Black Coffee (1953).
- Cal Tjader (recorded October 21, 1953, released by Savoy Records as catalog number 1117, with the flip side "Tangerine")
- Bing Crosby recorded the song in 1955 for use on his radio show and it was subsequently included in the box set The Bing Crosby CBS Radio Recordings (1954-56) issued by Mosaic Records (catalog MD7-245) in 2009.
- Les Elgart and his orchestra (released by Columbia Records as catalog number 40525, with the flip side "When Yuba Plays the Rhumba on the Tuba")
- Billy Eckstine (released in 1955 by MGM Records as catalog number 11984, with the flip side "Only You")
- Lester Young – recorded January 13, 1956, with Teddy Wilson, and released by Verve Records in 1959 on Pres and Teddy.
- Perry Como (released by RCA Victor Records in 1957 as catalog number 20-2662, with the flip side "What'll I Do?")
- Miles Davis (released on his 1957 album Walkin')
- Sarah Vaughan with Ted Dale Orchestra (released by Musicraft Records as catalog number 539, with the flip side "Gentleman Friend")
- The Youth (released 1969 by Deram Records (United Kingdom) as catalog number 226, with the flip side "Meadow of My Love "
- Chuck Penny (released by Tops in Music Records in 1972 as catalog number 109, with the flip side "Gimme, Gimme All the Time"
- Elkie Brooks (released 1984 on Screen Gems)
- In 1986, Australian recording artist Kate Ceberano recorded a version for her album Kate Ceberano and Her Septet.
- Der Herr Kam Über Sie – Love Me Or Leave Me (7") (1986)
- Robert Palmer – "Ridin' High" (1992)
- Bryan Ferry (released on As Time Goes By October 25, 1999)
- June Christy – A Friendly Session, Vol. 3 (2000) with the Johnny Guarnieri Quintet
- Sue Raney – Sue Raney Vol.2 (2004)
- Jane Monheit recorded a version on her 2004 album Taking a Chance on Love.
- Olivia Newton-John on her 2004 album Indigo: Women of Song.
- Cliff Richard – Bold As Brass (2010)
- Johnny Dankworth – Too Cool For The Blues (2010)
- Rod Stewart – Fly Me To The Moon ... The Great American Songbook - Volume V (2010)
- Three Days Grace recorded a hard rock version on their 2018 album Outsider
- Jens Jacob Tychsen – plays/sings "Love Me or Leave Me" as character Edward Weyse in an episode of the Danish drama comedy series Badehotellet (English: Seaside Hotel)
- Instant Classic barbershop quartet performed a cover version of this song during the 2015 Barbershop Harmony Society international competition.
