= Mike Speciale =

Band leader

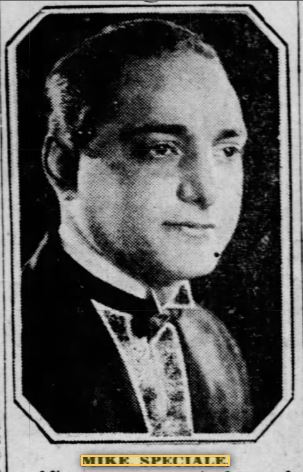
Mike Speciale, 1929

Mike Speciale was a dance band leader in the 1920s. He made numerous recordings for the Edison and Pathé companies, and appeared regularly on radio from the mid 1920s until at least 1934.

== History ==
Mike Speciale is known to have an organized band by mid 1921 that was based in Norfolk, Virginia, his place of residence at the time. In 1924 he was the office manager for Cosmopolitan Orchestras, Inc., Ray Miller's booking agency. By mid-1929 he was based out of New York, though touring extensively across the eastern half of the United States, and had named his musical outfit the "Crusaders." His orchestra gained significant popularity in the Coal Region.

== Recordings ==
Beginning October 1924 and ending February 1929, Speciale recorded nearly one hundred sides, appearing on Apex Records, Cameo Records, Edison Records, Harmony Records, Homochord, Lincoln Records, Pathé Records, Perfect Records, Regal Recordings and Romeo Records. Besides "Mike Speciale and His Orchestra", these recordings appear under the names "Carlton Terrace Orchestra", "Eldon's Dance Orchestra", "Lenox Dance Orchestra", and "Windsor Orchestra." Mistakenly, recordings also appear as "Lanin's Arcadians" and "Ben Selvin and His Orchestra".

In 1931 he made a series of electrical transcriptions for radio distribution.

== Radio ==
The Speciale orchestra was one of the first "name" orchestras to appear regularly on radio transmissions, and became known nationally through broadcasts from WEAF, WJZ, and WLW. His orchestra was also carried on the CBS radio network. His broadcast tagline was "Mike at the mike."

== Style ==
Mike Speciale's primary instrument was the violin. His band focused on melody and dance-ability, but injected jazz flavorings into the performances. His repertoire was drawn from jazz and blues material of the period, as well themes from classical music. This size of his orchestra was larger than average, and he at times used the number of personnel in the group in the same, such as "Mike Speciale and his Fourteen Crusaders." Dance hall managers attested that Speciale's catchphrase "Everybody Dance!" was not empty advertising, based on the number of patrons actively participating on the floor. A portion of Speciale's recordings are of interest to collectors of "hot dance" and jazz music of the 1920s.

Individual musicians who worked with Speciale include Bix Beiderbecke, Arthur Fields, Arthur Hall, Irving Kaufman, and Scrappy Lambert.
