= I've Got a Feeling I'm Falling =

1929 song by Fats Waller, Harry Link, and Billy Rose

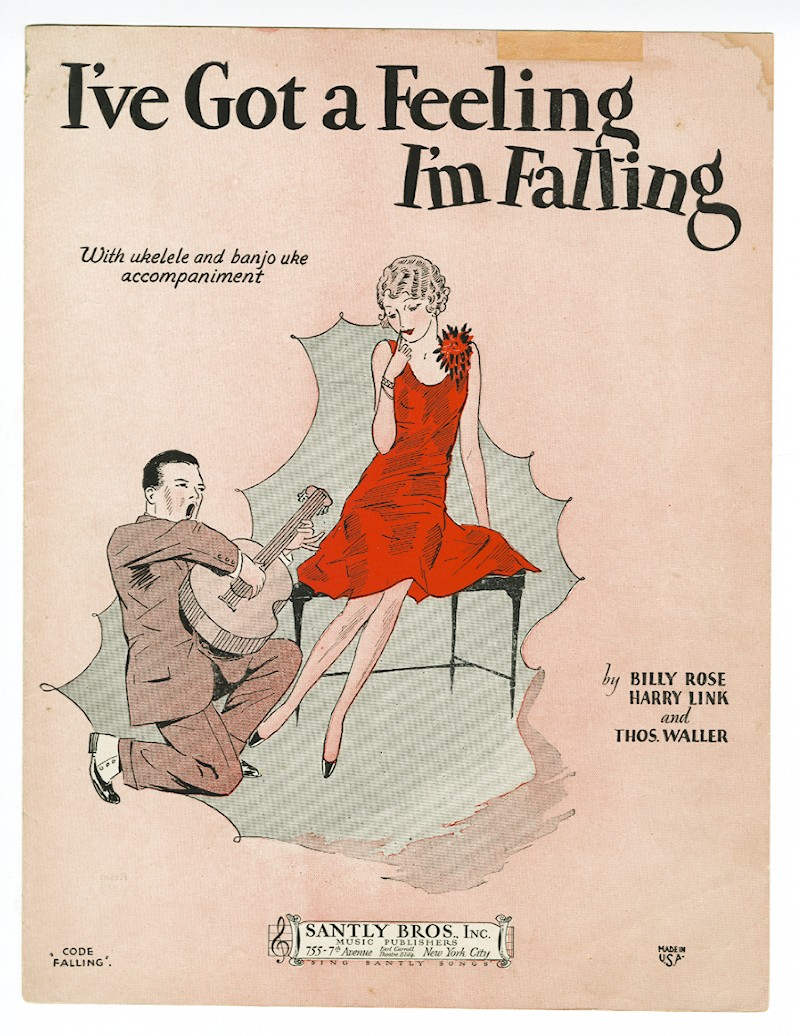
- Sheet music cover, 1929

Song
- Published: 1929
- Composers: Fats Waller and Harry Link
- Lyricist: Billy Rose

"I've Got a Feeling I'm Falling" is a popular song with music by Fats Waller and Harry Link and lyrics by Billy Rose, published in 1929. In 1929, right after its publication, a very large number of different recordings were made (see below); afterwards, the song has become a popular standard, recorded by many people.

== Recorded versions ==
- Gene Austin (recorded June 26, 1929, released by Victor Records as catalog number 22033, with the flip side "Maybe Who Knows")
- Smith Ballew and his orchestra (recorded April 3, 1929, released by OKeh Records as catalog number 41238, with the flip side "A Garden in the Rain"
- Continental Dance Orchestra (recorded April 17, 1929, released by Oriole Records as catalog number 1581, with the flip side "She's Got Great Ideas", also by Jewel Records as catalog number 5619, with the flip side "Huggable Kissable You")
- Jesse Crawford (organ instrumental; recorded May 7, 1929, released by Victor Records as catalog number 21981, with the flip side "She's a New Kind of Old-Fashioned Girl")
- Gay Ellis (vocal: Annette Hanshaw; recorded May 9, 1929, released by Supertone Records as catalog number 1021P, with the flip side "Daddy, Won't You Please Come Home?")
- Ella Fitzgerald and the Daydreamers (recorded December 23, 1947, released by Decca Records as catalog number 24332, with the flip side "My Baby Likes to Be-bop")
- Gotham Rhythm Boys (recorded June 19, 1929, released by Jewel Records as catalog number 5663, with the flip side "You're Just an Armful of Love")
- Earl Hines (released 1952 by Brunswick Records as catalog number 80190, with the flip side "My Fate Is In Your Hands ")
- Annette Hanshaw (recorded May 9, 1929, released by Diva Records as catalog number 2915-G, by Harmony Records as catalog number 915-H, and by Velvet Tone Records as catalog number 1915-V.
- Earl Hines Trio (recorded February 26, 1944, released by Signature Records as catalog number 28109, with the flip side "Squeeze Me")
- James P. Johnson (recorded June 8, 1944, released by Decca Records as catalog number 23593, with the flip side "Honeysuckle Rose")
- Art Kassel and his orchestra (recorded 1947, released by Mercury Records as catalog number 5088, with the flip side "In a Little Book Shop")
- Harold Lambert (recorded April 5, 1929, released by Vocalion Records as catalog number 15800, with the flip side "Coquette")
- Sam Lanin's University Orchestra (recorded May 23, 1929, released by Supertone Records as catalog number 9437, with the flip side "What a Day")
- Miff Mole and his Little Molers (recorded April 19, 1929, released by OKeh Records as catalog number 41232, with the flip side "That's a Plenty")
- Joe Morris and his orchestra (recorded May 23, 1929, released by Champion Records as catalog number 15738, with the flip side "The One in the World")
- "The Mystery Girl"(recorded May 14, 1929, released by Columbia Records as catalog number 1839D, with the flip side "I'd Do Anything for You")
- Cliff Roberts and his orchestra (recorded April 1929, released by Romeo Records as catalog number 967, with the flip side "I'm Longing to Belong to Someone")
- Joan Shaw with Russ Case's orchestra (recorded 1950, released by MGM Records as catalog number 10789B, with the flip side "I Had a Talk with the Wind and the Rain")
- Ted Wallace Campus Boys (recorded May 8, 1929, released by Columbia Records as catalog number 1833D, with the flip side "Jericho")
- Thomas "Fats" Waller (recorded August 2, 1929, released by Victor Records as catalog number 22092, with the flip side "Love Me or Leave Me")

== In popular culture ==
In the 1983 film Zelig, archival footage is used to show Fanny Brice giving a private roof-top performance of the song for the main character (played by Woody Allen).
