= A Garden in the Rain =

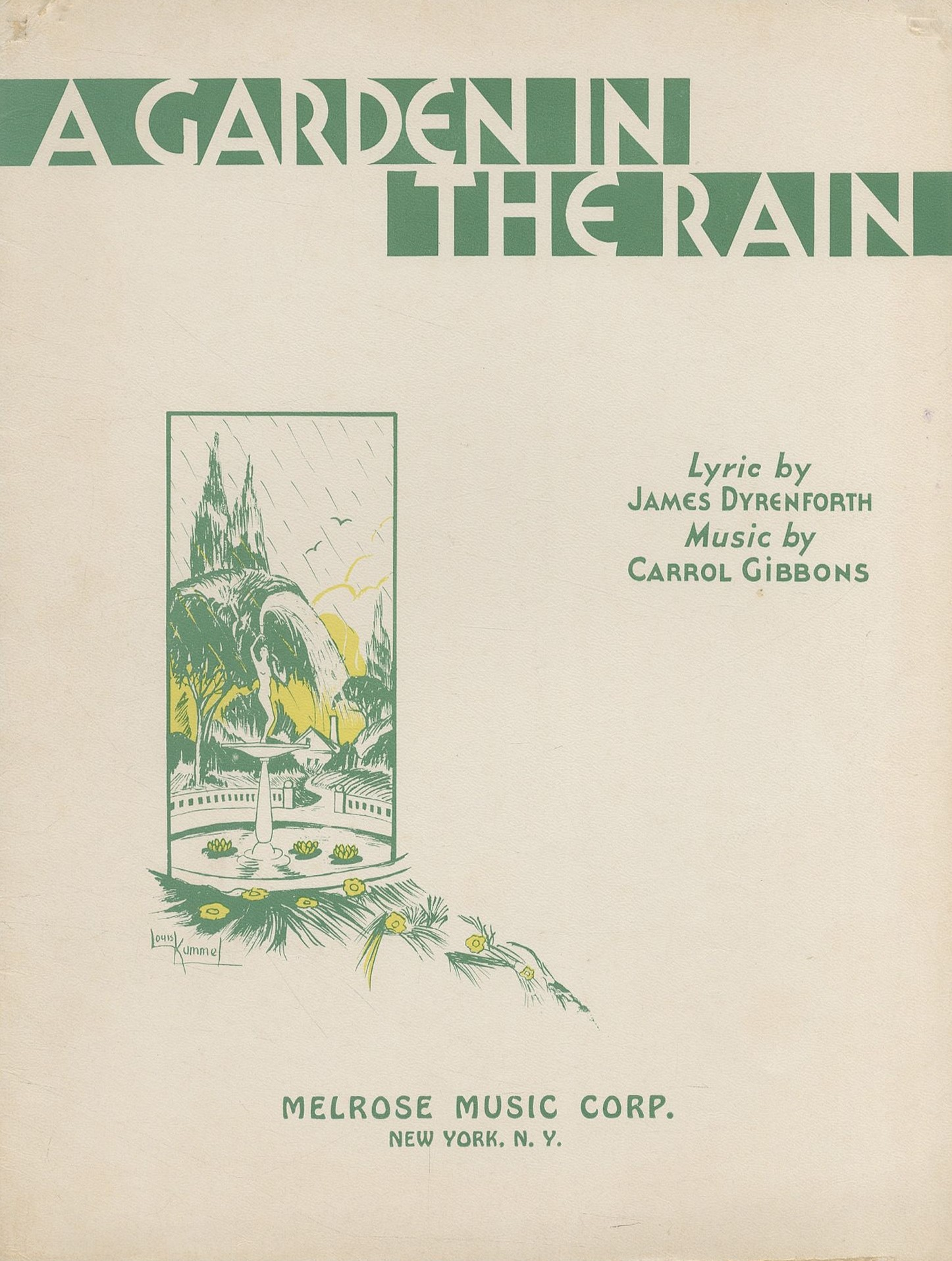
- Sheet music cover, 1928

Song by George Metaxa, with Carroll Gibbons and the Savoy Hotel Orpheans
- Published: 1928
- Recorded: July 1928
- Composer: Carroll Gibbons
- Lyricist: James Dyrenforth

"A Garden in the Rain"

Song by Gene Austin
- B-side: "Dream Mother"
- Published: 1928 Campbell Connelly & Co Ltd.
- Released: May 3, 1929
- Recorded: March 13, 1929
- Genre: Jazz, Pop Vocal
- Label: Victor 21915
- Composer: Carroll Gibbons
- Lyricist: James Dyrenforth

Gene Austin singles chronology
"Carolina Moon" (1929)	"A Garden in the Rain" (1929)	"Maybe! - Who Knows?" (1929)

"A Garden in the Rain" is a popular song. The music was composed by Carroll Gibbons, the lyrics by James Dyrenforth. The song was published in 1928. The song was first recorded by Gibbons with the Savoy Hotel Orpheans and vocals by George Metaxa (later spelled: Georges Metaxa), in July 1928. Gibbons took over as bandleader of the Savoy Hotel Orpheans in 1931, and the tune became his Savoy signature.

In 1942 Garden In The Rain was used as part of the score for the Marlene Dietrich movie Pittsburgh, also played throughout the film's trailer.

== Popular recordings ==
The song had two periods of great popularity: in 1929 and in 1952.

- In 1929, the biggest hit versions were by Gene Austin, by John McCormack, and by George Olsen's orchestra with a vocal by Fran Frey. All three versions were released by Victor Records.
- In 1952 the most popular version was recorded by The Four Aces. Their recording was released by Decca Records. It first reached the Billboard magazine Best Seller chart on December 28, 1951, and lasted 7 weeks on the chart, peaking at number 14. The flip side, "Tell Me Why", was an even bigger hit for the Aces, reaching number 2 on the chart. The same recording of "A Garden in the Rain"/"Tell Me Why" was also released in the United Kingdom by Brunswick Records in 1952.

== Other recordings ==
- Gene Austin (recorded March 13, 1929, released by Victor Records, with the flip side "Dream Mother", also released by Bluebird Records, with the flip side "Please Don't Talk About Me When I'm Gone")
- Smith Ballew and his orchestra (recorded April 11, 1929, released by OKeh Records, with the flip side "I've Got a Feeling I'm Falling")
- Blue Barron and his orchestra (recorded July 15, 1938, released by Bluebird Records, with the flip side "While Others Are Building Castles")
- Earl Burtnett's Biltmore Trio (recorded April 1, 1929, released by Brunswick Records, with the flip side "Love Me or Leave Me")
- Milton Charles (Organ instrumental, recorded June 11, 1929, released by Columbia Records, with the flip side "Pagan Love Song")
- Perry Como (with Russ Case's Orchestra) (recorded March 14, 1946, released by RCA Victor Records, with the flip side "You Must Have Been a Beautiful Baby", re-released with the flip side "Oh, How I Miss You Tonight")
- Vic Dana Reached Billboard number 97 on October 25, 1964 (Dolton label)
- Four Young Men (released 1962 by Dore Records, with the flip side "That Man Paul")
- Connie Francis (on MGM album, My Thanks to You, released 1959)
- Jane Froman (recorded September 1946, released by Majestic Records, with the flip side "For You, for Me, for Evermore")
- Jerry Gray and his orchestra (recorded January 14, 1952, released by Decca Records, with the flip side "Unforgettable"
- The Harmonians (recorded April 4, 1929, released by Supertone Records, with the flip side "If You Believed in Me")
- Skitch Henderson (recorded 1946, released by Capitol Records, with the flip side "And So to Bed")
- Dan Hicks and His Hot Licks, on their 1978 Warner Bros. Records album It Happened One Bite
- Diana Krall (recorded August 26, 1997, released by Impulse! Records on the album Love Scenes)
- Ray Martin and his orchestra
- Billy Holt, New York,
- George Olsen and his orchestra (recorded April 10, 1929, released by Victor Records, with the flip side "Dream Mother")
- Vincent Richards and his orchestra (recorded May 13, 1929, released by Romeo Records and Lincoln Records, both releases with the flip side "In A Great Big Way")
- Willard Robison (recorded March 15, 1929, released by Columbia Records, with the flip side "Blue Hawaii")
- Dave Rubinoff and his orchestra (recorded April 10, 1929, released by Brunswick Records, with the flip side "Blue Hawaii")
- Frank Sinatra (recorded June 12, 1962, released by Reprise Records on the album Frank Sinatra Sings Great Songs from Great Britain)
- The Virginia Creepers (vocal: C. Hale) (recorded May 13, 1929, released by Pathé Records, with the flip side "Old-Fashioned Lady")
- Henry Wells and his orchestra (recorded February 27, 1940, released by Decca Records, with the flip side "Home")
