= Freight Train Blues =

1934 hillbilly song written by John Lair

"I Got the Freight Train Blues"

Single by Rambling Red Foley acc. by Cumberland Ridge Runners
- B-side: "Echoes of My Plantation Home"
- Released: 1934
- Recorded: Chicago, c.March 21, 1934
- Genre: Hillbilly
- Length: 2:53
- Label: Several ARC affiliates (Note: Foley's single was released by several ARC affiliates, including Banner, Conqueror, Perfect, Melotone, Romeo, and Oriole.)
- Songwriter: John Lair

"Freight Train Blues" is an early American hillbilly-style country music song written by John Lair. He wrote it for Red Foley, who recorded the song with the title "I Got the Freight Train Blues" in 1934. The tune was subsequently recorded by several musicians, with popular renditions by Roy Acuff in 1936 and 1947. Bob Dylan later adapted it for his self-titled debut album (1962).

== Composition and recording ==
John Lair was a Kentucky native, who had a long career in the music industry. He was a prolific songwriter and was responsible for about 500 compositions. In an interview, he explained that he wrote the song "in memory of the sound of the train that punctuated his youth in the southern United States". His lyrics include:

I was born in Dixie in a boomer shed
Just a little shanty by the railroad track
Freight train was it taught me how to cry
The holler of the driver was my lullaby

Lair wrote the song for fellow Kentuckian Red Foley, who recorded it in Chicago around March 21, 1934. Foley was backed by the Cumberland Ridge Runners, a string band which included Lair and others who played a variety of instruments, such as fiddle, dulcimer, banjo, and mandolin.

In 1934, Foley's recording was issued by several American Record Corporation (ARC) labels, including Banner, Conqueror, Perfect, Melotone, Romeo, and Oriole. The 78 rpm record was released before music publications such as Billboard tracked sales of hillbilly or country singles. The song is included on Foley anthologies, such as Old Shep: The Red Foley Recordings 1933–1950 (Bear Family Records, 2006).

== Roy Acuff renditions ==
"Freight Train Blues"

Single by Roy Acuff and His Crazy Tennesseeans
- B-side: "Wabash Cannon Ball"
- Released: December 1938
- Recorded: Chicago, October 21, 1936
- Genre: Hillbilly
- Length: 2:44
- Label: Vocalion (Note: Acuff's 1938 single was also released by ARC affiliates Okeh and Conqueror.)
- Songwriter: John Lair

Roy Acuff recorded his first version of "Freight Train Blues" in Chicago on October 21, 1936, with his group, billed as "Roy Acuff and His Crazy Tennesseeans". Group harmonica player Sam "Dynamite" Hatcher, who "prefer[red] blues-tinged numbers", provided the vocal, while Acuff added the simulated train whistle. Dobro player Clell Summey performed the slide guitar fills that run throughout the song.

Vocalion Records issued it as a single in December 1938, with "Wabash Cannon Ball" as the flip-side. However, only "Wabash Cannon Ball" is included in Billboard's listings of "American Folk Tunes", where it appeared at least 25 times between 1939 and 1943.

The popularity of the record led Columbia Records to arrange for Acuff record another version. The session took place in Hollywood, California, in January 1947, with Acuff's backing band, the Smoky Mountain Boys. This time, Acuff provided his own vocal and modified the lyrics, including reordering the first verse:

I was born in Dixie in a boomer's shack
Just a little shanty by the railroad track
The humming of the drivers was my lullaby
And a freight train whistle taught me how to cry.

Notation for the 1947 version shows a key of C major with a "shuffle" tempo of 160 beats per minute in common or 4/4 time. Acuff's vocal on the chorus shifts between his normal range and a falsetto. Although his voice lowered over the years and prompted him to forgo some tunes in his repertoire, he continued to perform "Freight Train Blues" and could "even do a Jimmie Rodgers type yodel".

Columbia released the single in 1947, again with "Wabash Cannon Ball" (also re-recorded) as the single's flip side. In October 1947, Columbia packaged four of Acuff's 78s (eight songs) together as an early album, with the title Songs of the Smoky Mountains. "Freight Train Blues" appears on several Acuff anthologies, including the Columbia albums Greatest Hits (1970) and The Essential Roy Acuff: 1936–1949 (1992).

== Bob Dylan version ==
"Freight Train Blues" was the last song Bob Dylan recorded to appear on his debut album, Bob Dylan (1962). The recording session took place at Columbia's studios in New York City on November 22, 1961. The album notes indicate that the song "was adapted from an old disk by Roy Acuff". However, unlike Acuff's or Foley's renditions, Dylan performs it as a solo piece, with his vocal accompanied by guitar and harmonica. He also plays the song at an unusually fast tempo for a folk song, which several biographers have commented on:

- "This old Roy Acuff number is one of the funniest early Dylan songs. Not only is the song taken at a breakneck tempo, it also features Dylan's longest recorded note—over 25 seconds!"
- "His vocal performance, although marked with some ironies, barely follows the tempo on the upper parts. Bob is on the verge of derailing. Strange for a song called 'Freight Train Blues'!"
- "'Freight Train Blues' was played so fast that the articulation of the words seems impossible and the long, long, long enunciation of the oooooo in the chorus is as haunting as a train whistle crossing North Dakota."
- "'Freight Train Blues' [and two other songs on his debut album] are remarkable for their frantic pacing, along with their blues-based vocal stylings."

Dylan also added some new lyrics and at various times, Columbia has listed the song as being in the "public domain" or "arranged by B. Dylan". However, author Todd Harvey has identified John Lair's 1930s composition as the base for the songs "most commonly performed by folk revivalists and country musicians".

== Bibliography ==
- Cohen, Norm (2000). Long Steel Rail: The Railroad in American Folksong. Urbana, Illinois: University of Illinois Press. ISBN 978-0252068812.
- Hales, Peter Bacon (2014). Outside the Gates of Eden. Chicago: University of Chicago Press. ISBN 978-0-226-31315-3.
- Harkins, Anthony (2004). Hillbilly: A Cultural History of an American Icon. Oxford, England: Oxford University Press. ISBN 0-19-514631-X.
- Harvey, Todd (2001). The Formative Dylan: Transmission and Stylistic Influences, 1961–1963. Scarecrow Press. ISBN 978-0810841154.
- Margotin, Philippe; Guesdon, Jean-Michel (2015). Bob Dylan: All the Songs – The Story Behind Every Track. Running Press. ISBN 978-0316353533.
- Nogowski, John (2008). Bob Dylan: A Descriptive, Critical Discography and Filmography, 1961–2007 (Second ed.). Jefferson, North Carolina: McFarland & Company. ISBN 978-0-7864-3518-0.
- Russell, Tony (2004). Country Music Records. Oxford, England: Oxford University Press. ISBN 0-19-513989-5.
- Schlappi, Elizabeth (1997). Roy Acuff: The Smoky Mountain Boy. Gretna: Pelican Publishing. ISBN 0-88289-932-5.
- Starr, Larry (2021). Listening to Bob Dylan. Urbana, Illinois: University of Illinois Press. ISBN 978-0252052880.
- Sullivan, Steve (2013). "Wabash Cannon Ball (1936/1947)—Roy Acuff". Encyclopedia of Great Popular Song Recordings, Volume 1. Lanham, Maryland: Scarecrow Press. ISBN 978-0-8108-8295-9.
- Williams, Stacy (1962). Bob Dylan (Album notes). Bob Dylan. New York City: Columbia Records. CS 8579.
- Wolfe, Charles K. (2015). A Good Natured Riot: The Birth of the Grand Ole Opry. Nashville, Tennessee: Vanderbilt University Press. ISBN 978-0-8265-2075-3.
