= Chick Bullock =

American jazz and dance band vocalist (1898–1981)

Charles (Chick) Bullock (September 16, 1898 – September 15, 1981) was an American jazz and dance band vocalist, most active during the 1930s. He recorded around 500 tunes over the course of his career. Bullock was mostly associated with the ARC group of record labels (Melotone, Perfect, Banner, Oriole, Romeo). Many of his records were issued under the name "Chick Bullock and his Levee Loungers".

Bullock belonged to a select group of mostly freelance vocalists who sang the vocal refrains on hundreds of New York recording sessions, which included Smith Ballew, Scrappy Lambert, Irving Kaufman, Arthur Fields, and Dick Robertson. Some of these performers were also instrumentalists, but they were featured more often as vocalists. (All of the above had records also issued under their own name, and in case of Ballew, actually had a working orchestra for a couple of years.)

Bullock, who rarely performed live because his face was disfigured due to an eye disease, was born in Montana to William and Emily Bullock, both of whom were English immigrants. His career began in vaudeville and he sang in movie palaces. He began working regularly as a studio musician in the late 1920s and in the 1930s he sang with the bands of Duke Ellington, Luis Russell, Cab Calloway, Bunny Berigan, Bill Coleman, Jack Teagarden, Tommy Dorsey, Jimmy Dorsey, Joe Venuti, and Eddie Lang. Bullock's recordings proved so popular that he used pseudonyms for some recordings, including the name Sleepy Hall.

The 1942-44 AFM recording ban essentially ended Bullock's career, and he retired from the music business in 1942. He moved to California in 1946 and opened his own real estate firm.

== Death ==
On September 15, 1981, Bullock died in California at the age of 82.
