= Frank Ferera =

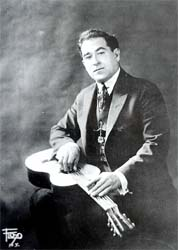
- Frank Ferera

Background information
- Also known as: Frank Ferera; Palakiko Ferreira
- Born: Frank Ferreira; June 12, 1885; Honolulu, Oʻahu, Hawaiʻi
- Died: June 26, 1951 (aged 66)
- Occupation: Live performer
- Instruments: Ukulele; Guitar
- Years active: 1900 – 1951
- Labels: List: Aeolian; Banner; Blue Amberol; Brunswick; Cameo; Clarion; Columbia; Crown; Edison Diamond Disc; Emerson; Empire; Gennett; Globe; Harmony; Imperial; Lyric; Mandel; Montgomery-Ward; Okeh; Olympic; Operaphone; Paramount; Pathé; Perfect; Regal; Supertone; Velvet Tone; Victor Records; Vocalion

Frank Ferera (June 12, 1885 – June 26, 1951) was a Hawaii musician who recorded successfully between 1915 and 1930. He was the first star of Hawaiian music and influenced many later artists.

== Biography ==
Frank Ferera was born in Honolulu, Kingdom of Hawaiʻi in 1885 of Portuguese ancestry. Ferera first visited mainland United States as part of the Keoki E Awai troupe, which had been booked to entertain at the Panama-Pacific International Exposition. The band's performance was witnessed by Thomas Edison, who issued two solo songs by Ferera on his record label.

He married Helen Louise Greenus, daughter of Seattle businessman Albert E. Greenus, and toured with her through the USA, appearing in vaudeville. In 1916, they signed a contract with Columbia Records and recorded prolifically. They also recorded for Victor Records, and their "Drowsy Waters" was a major success, selling more than 300,000 copies. The duo also recorded two new discs for Edison. In 1917, Ferera's sister-in-law Irene Greenus joined as a vocalist. As a duo or a trio, the group's discography included releases on several other labels including Gennett, Paramount, Lyric, Pathe Imperial, and Empire. Ferera also began a guitar partnership with Anthony Franchini that lasted over seven years.

On December 12, 1919, Frank and Helen were on board the steamship SS President, from Los Angeles back to their home in Seattle. Frank reported that Helen had gone on deck for a walk at 4 a.m. and never returned. After a search failed to turn up the missing Mrs. Ferera, she was presumed lost at sea.

In 1924, Ferera played guitar accompaniment to Vernon Dalhart's ballad "Wreck of the Old 97" (Victor Record No. 19427), sometimes cited as the first million-selling country music release in the American record industry.

In the late 1920s, during a wave of Hawaiian music popularity, Frank Ferera's Hawaiian Trio recorded a number of songs with jazz singer Annette Hanshaw, including: "Was It A Dream?", "For Old Time's Sake", "Get Out and Get Under the Moon", "I Love A Ukulele", "Lonely Nights In Hawaii", "Chiquita", "Maui Girl", "Sonny Boy", "Sweet Lei Lehua", "Carolina Moon", "Maui Chimes", "Pagan Love Song", "Singing in the Rain", "Ua No a Like - Sweet Constancy", and "Forget Me Not", "Lazy Louisiana Moon", and "Pale Blue Waters".

While Ferera was the first commercially successful Hawaiian recording artist in the teens, by the late 1920s, a new wave of steel guitarists, including Sol Hoʻopiʻi, were upstaging him. Ferera is estimated to have played guitar on more than 2,000 discs.

Ferera married three times. He died on June 26, 1951, due to complications following a stroke. He was survived by his third wife, Ruth, son Frank Ferreira III and daughter Mary Ferreira.

== Singles ==
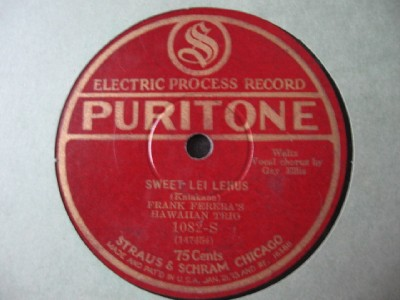
Old Puritone

"Hawaiian Portuguese Tango"
Guitar duet recorded in May 1916 by Louise and Ferera

- "My Old Kentucky Home"
- "Kilima Waltz"
- "Along The Way To Waikiki"
- "Maui Chime"
- "Southern Blues"
- "Dreamin'"
