= Bob Haring =

Bob Haring (August 21, 1895 – February 18, 1975) was an American popular music bandleader of the 1920s and early 1930s.

== Biography ==
Haring began recording as the music director of the then-new Cameo Records label beginning in 1922 under a plethora of pseudonyms, such as The Caroliners, The Lincoln Dance Orchestra, The Society Night Club Orchestra, King Solomon and His Miners, etc. (Cameo was one of the primary 'dime store' labels in the 1920s and Haring's sessions there were also issued on Plaza/ARC's other labels, including Romeo, Perfect, Oriole and others.)

In 1925, Haring signed a contract with Brunswick Records. His best recordings were issued on the Brunswick label, one of the three major recordings labels in the 1920s. His first commercial recording for Brunswick was made on May 16, 1925 as the leader of the Regent Club Orchestra. The Regent Club Orchestra focused on playing waltzes. It was at this time that Haring developed the lush sound for which he became famous in the late 1920s. Due to the popularity of his recordings, Haring became the leader of The Colonial Club Orchestra in May 1926. This orchestra that focused on fox-trot dance music played in an elegant style with the occasional tango and waltz. Later that year, in July 1926, Haring appeared on the label for the first time under his own name as Bob Haring & His Orchestra. In all of these recordings, Haring emphasized a classy society sound by extensively using string instruments, such as violins, to carry the melody. This is especially evident in his elegant waltz recordings, mostly issued as The Regent Club Orchestra.

By April 1929, Haring had been appointed the musical director for the Brunswick recording laboratories in New York City "to supervise musical arrangements in connection with recording." Bob Haring continued to record for Brunswick Records until the Warner Bros. took over the company in April 1930 and the subsequent reorganization that took place led to the non-renewal of Haring's contract in March 1931. Haring then recorded for ARC (Banner, Oriole, Perfect, Romeo) through July, 1931. Haring continued to work in radio, however, until the introduction of swing music drastically changed the public's taste in music around 1935.

Haring's discography is difficult to trace, since many of the sides he performed on do not actually list his name. However, several dozen sessions on which Haring led or arranged an orchestra have been catalogued by discographers, mostly falling between 1920 and 1931.

His recordings with The Colonial Club Orchestra and The Regent Club Orchestra for Brunswick were his most popular in terms of sales.
