= Smith Ballew =

American actor, singer, and orchestra leader (1902–1984)

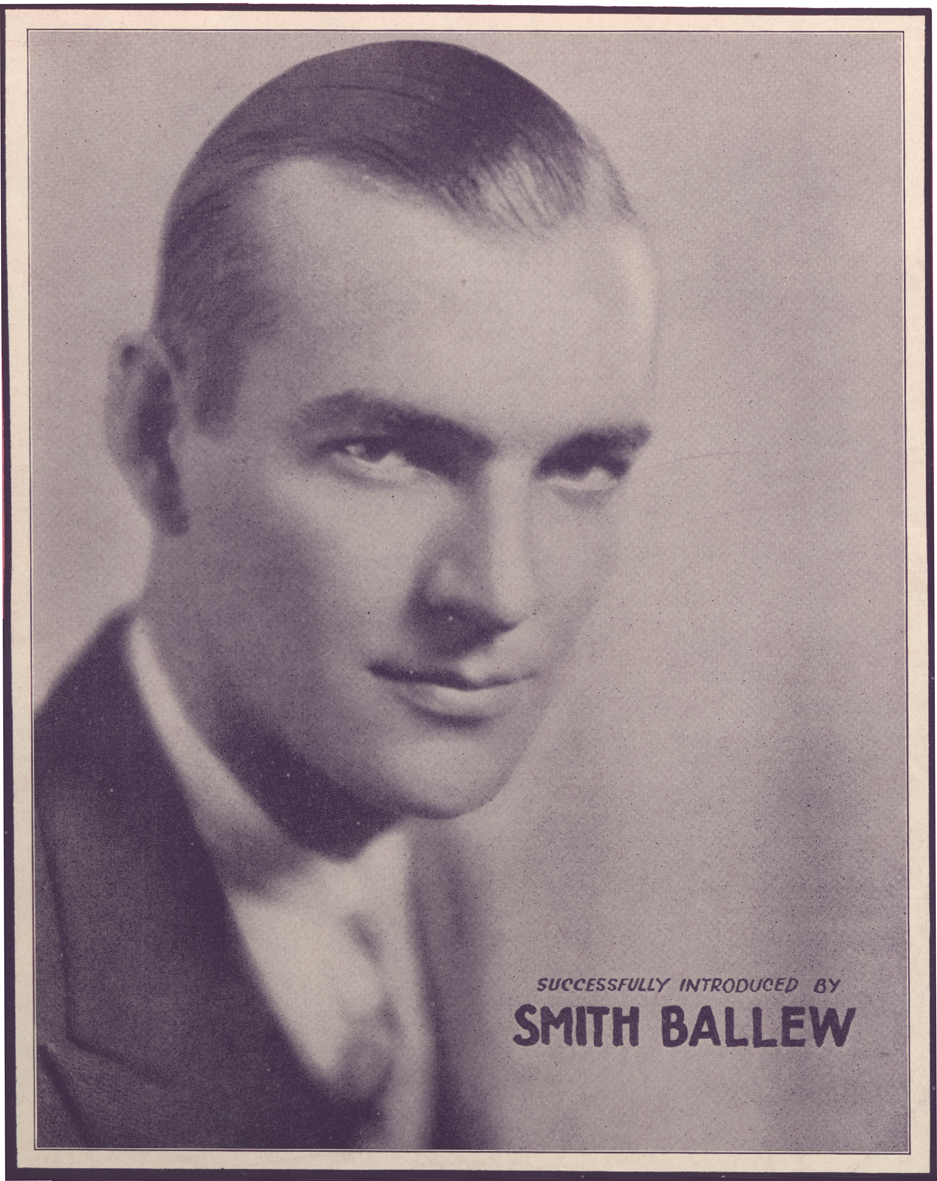
- Smith Ballew on a 1931 sheet music cover.

Background information
- Born: Sykes Ballew; January 21, 1902; Palestine, Texas, U.S.
- Died: May 2, 1984 (aged 82) Longview, Texas, U.S.
- Genres: Popular music, Jazz, Country music, Western movies
- Occupations: Vocalist, musician, orchestra leader, film actor
- Instrument: Vocals
- Years active: 1930s–50s

Sykes "Smith" Ballew (January 21, 1902 – May 2, 1984) was an American actor, sophisticated singer, orchestra leader, and a western singing star. He also was billed as Buddy Blue, Charles Roberts, and Billy Smith.

== Early years ==
The son of William Young Ballew and his wife, May Elizabeth (Smith) Ballew, he was born in Palestine, Texas in 1902, where he grew up attending local schools. He attended Sherman High School, Austin College and the University of Texas.

During his time at Austin College, Ballew and his brother, Charlie, formed the Texasjazzers orchestra. Before that, he organized Jimmie's Joys jazz combo at the university, playing banjo and singing with the group.

== Career ==
Starting in the late 1920s, he became one of the most recognizable vocalists on hundreds of dance band and jazz records, based in New York City. During this time, Ballew along with Scrappy Lambert, Dick Robertson, and Chick Bullock were the most prolific studio vocalists. In 1929, he organized the Smith Ballew Orchestra, with a focus on his singing.

Ballew began his singing career on the radio. In the 1930s he became known as one of the earliest of the singing cowboys on the movie screen. His film debut came in Palm Springs (1936). He did a series of musical Westerns for Paramount Pictures and one for 20th Century Fox, continuing in supporting roles until the 1950s. He also dubbed singing for John Wayne in The Man from Utah (1934).

Ballew was one of the hosts of old-time radio's Shell Chateau.

Ballew's band's opening theme song was "Tonight There Is Music in the Air"; its closing theme was "Home".

Between 1929 and 1935, he made scores of records issued under his own name for OKeh, the dime store labels (Banner, Domino, Jewel, Regal, Perfect, Oriole as Buddy Blue & His Texans or Jack Blue's Texans), Columbia, and Crown. Few of these popular records gave any indication of his future Cowboy style.

== Death ==
Ballew died at the age of 82 in Longview, Texas. He was buried in Fort Worth.
