= Harlan Lattimore =

American jazz musician

Harlan Lattimore (November 25, 1908 – July 1980), was a popular African-American singer with several jazz orchestras of the 1930s, most notably Don Redman's. Starting in 1932, singing in the Don Redman Orchestra, Harlem nightclub Connie's Inn marketed Lattimore as the "colored Bing Crosby" [sic].

== Biography ==
Lattimore was born in 1908 in Cincinnati, where he built his reputation as a singer on that city's WLW radio station. By March 1932, he had arrived on the New York City music scene, and began his recording career with Fletcher Henderson's band. Not long afterwards, Lattimore was signed by Don Redman as his vocalist. This association lasted until 1936.

His style of singing, as well as the timbre of his voice, closely resembling that of Bing Crosby, earned him recording dates with some of the top studio and dance bands of the era, most notably those of Victor Young, Abe Lyman, and Isham Jones, as well a number of dates as vocalist for a number of generic dance records for ARC (on Melotone, Banner, Oriole, Romeo, and Perfect).

With the exposure of Lattimore to the public through radio broadcasts (with Don Redman), recordings and an appearance in a Vitaphone short subject film (with Redman), it seemed a foregone conclusion that he was headed for stardom. This was not to be.

Lattimore's behavior became unreliable and erratic in the mid-1930s, and he made his last recordings with Redman in 1936. After service in World War II, he dropped out of the music scene. On November 11, 1949, he appeared at Carnegie Hall in what was billed as a comeback, produced by Don Redman.

Although the name Lattimore is now looked upon as a footnote in American popular music, he was pioneering African-American singer who established a style and role later filled by such musical luminaries as Billy Eckstine and Nat King Cole.

The 1933 Vitaphone short, Don Redman and his Orchestra, is included on the Warner Brothers DVD of Dames, where he sings a rendition of Harold Arlen's "Ill Wind", which the Redman band never recorded.
