= Dinah (song) =

1925 song

Song
- Published: 1925 by Henry Waterson, Inc.
- Composer: Harry Akst
- Lyricists: Sam M. Lewis and Joe Young

"Dinah" is a popular song published in 1925 and introduced by Ethel Waters at the Plantation Club on Broadway. It was integrated into the show Kid Boots. The music was written by Harry Akst and the lyrics by Sam M. Lewis and Joe Young. Hit versions in 1926 were by Ethel Waters, The Revelers, Red Pepper Sam, Cliff Edwards, and Fletcher Henderson.

One singer, Fanny Rose Shore, became so identified with the song that DJ Martin Block called her "Dinah Shore", which then stuck as her stage name for the next 50 years.

== Other versions ==
- Louis Armstrong. Recorded in New York City on May 4, 1930, it was released by Okeh. "Dinah" became a frequent number in Armstrong's live performances and radio broadcasts after the making of this recording.
- Chet Baker. Recorded at Phil Turetsky's House, Los Angeles, on July 9, 1952, it was released on The Complete Pacific Jazz and Capitol Recordings of the Original Gerry Mulligan Quartet and Tentette with Chet Baker (Mosaic) and The Complete Pacific Jazz Recordings of The Gerry Mulligan Quartet with Chet Baker (Pacific Jazz).
- Josephine Baker. Recorded in Paris in October 1926, it was released on a 78 by Odeon.
- Red Pepper Sam. Recorded October 27, 1931 in New York.
- The Boswell Sisters. Recorded on December 13, 1934, it was released on a 78 by Brunswick. This reached No.3 in the charts of the day.
- Cab Calloway. Recorded on June 7, 1932, it was released on a 78 by ARC and issued on Banner, Melotone, Oriole, Perfect, Romeo, and Vocalion. The second time he recorded the song was live at The New Café Zanzibar on July 17, 1945. It was released on the album Cab Calloway '45: Live at the New Cafe Zanzibar by Magnetic Records (1993).
- Bing Crosby & The Mills Brothers with studio orchestra. Recorded in New York City on December 16, 1931, it was released on a 78 Brunswick. It was assessed by Joel Whitburn as topping the charts of the day.
- Duke Ellington. Recorded on February 9, 1932, it was released on a 78 by Victor.
- Judy Garland sang a version of the song in June 1937 for the Jack Oakie's College. This was depicted in the 1978 television movie Rainbow.
- Benny Goodman Quartet. Recorded on August 26, 1936, it was released on 78 Victor Records.
- Fletcher Henderson with Coleman Hawkins (1926).
- The Hot Sardines – Shanghai'd (Decca/Universal on July 25, 2011).
- Dick Mine. 1934 as Dick Mine and his Serenaders (credited as translator and lyricist under Koichi Mine); 1940 with A. L. King and his Florida Serenaders
- Thelonious Monk. Recorded on November 2, 1964, it was released on Solo Monk (Columbia, 1965).
- Quintette du Hot Club de France. Recorded in December 1934 in Paris, France with Django Reinhardt and Stephane Grappelli. It was released on a 78 by Oriole in the U.S.
- The Savoy Orpheans recorded an early instrumental version on October 30, 1925, released as a 78 in December, 1925 on His Master's Voice (# B 2183 Dinah / The Co-ed).
- Fats Waller. Recorded in Camden, New Jersey, on June 24, 1935, it was released on a 78 rpm by Victor. This reached No. 7 in the charts of the day.
- Ethel Waters. Recorded on October 10, 1925, it was released on a 78 by Columbia.
- Bob Wills & His Texas Playboys. Recorded May 27, 1946 at the Mark Hopkins Hotel in San Francisco, California for the Tiffany Music Company.
- The Revelers. Recorded in 1925. It was released on a 78 by His Master's Voice.
- Big Bad Voodoo Daddy; released in 2017 for their album Louie, Louie, Louie.
- Wynton Marsalis. Released in 2019 with the soundtrack for Bolden, a biopic depicting the life of Jazz pioneer Buddy Bolden. Sung by actor Reno Wilson who played the part of Louis Armstrong in the film.
- Fess Williams. Recorded in 1930 for RCA Victor.
- Clarence William's Stompers. Recorded January 4, 1926. The song "Spanish Shawl" was on the opposite side.

== See also ==
- List of 1920s jazz standards
