= Annette Hanshaw =

American jazz singer (1901–1985)

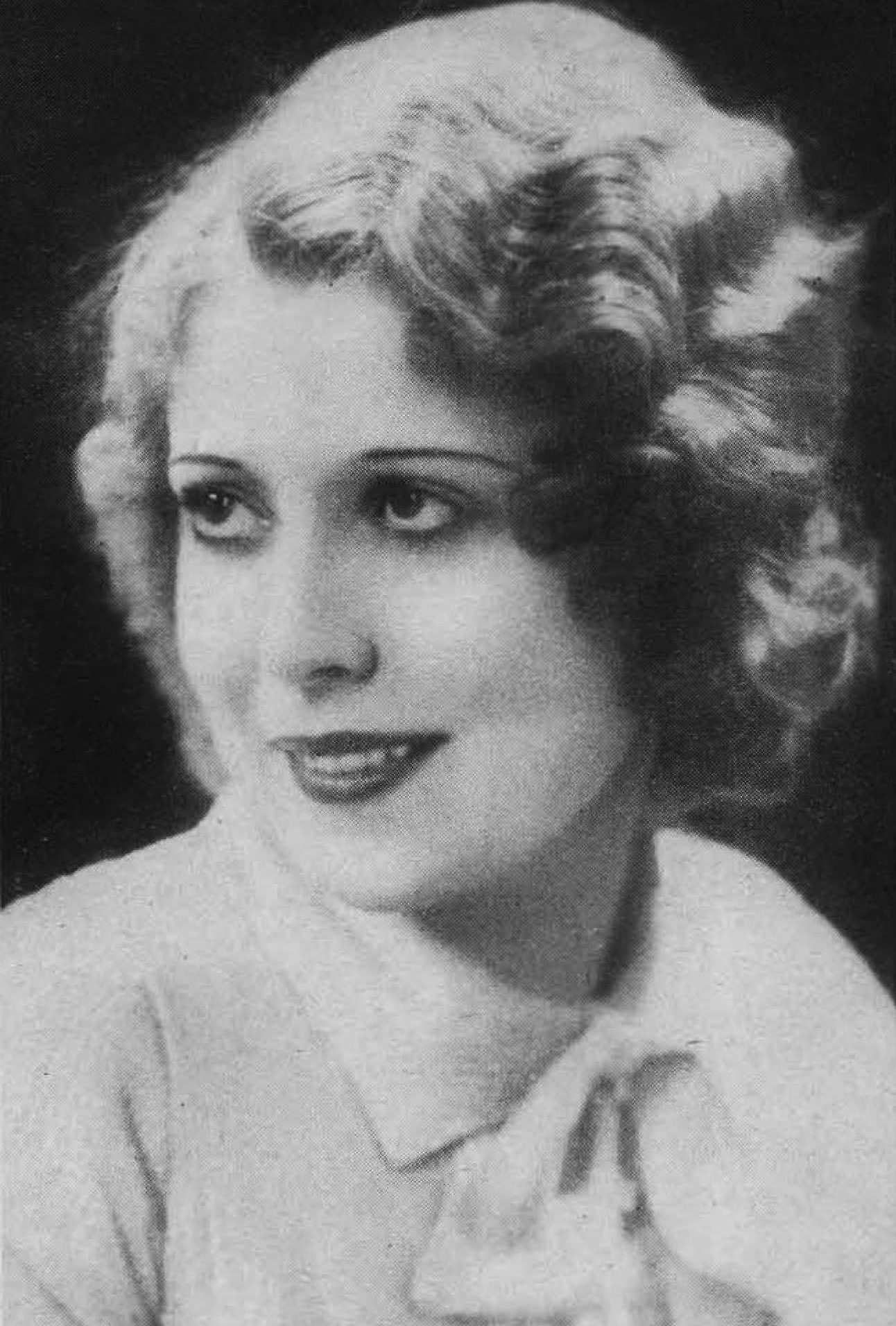
- Hanshaw, c. 1934

Background information
- Born: Catherine Annette Hanshaw; October 18, 1901; New York City, U.S.
- Died: March 13, 1985 (aged 83) New York City, U.S.
- Genres: Jazz
- Occupation: Singer
- Instrument: Vocals
- Years active: 1926–1937
- Labels: Pathé, Perfect, Columbia
- Spouse(s): Herman "Wally" Rose (m. 1929–1954; his death); Herb Kurtin (m. 1974–1985; her death)

Catherine Annette Hanshaw (October 18, 1901 – March 13, 1985) was an American Jazz Age singer. She was one of the most popular radio stars of the late 1920s and early 1930s, with many of her most notable performances taking place on NBC's Maxwell House Show Boat. Over four million of her records had been sold by 1934, following the peak of her popularity.

In her ten-year recording career, she recorded about 250 sides. In a 1934 poll conducted by Radio Stars magazine, she received the title of best female popular singer (Bing Crosby was voted the best male popular singer). Second place went to Ethel Shutta, third place went to Ruth Etting, and fourth place went to Kate Smith.

== Biography ==
Hanshaw was born in Manhattan on October 18, 1901, to Frank Wayne Hanshaw and Mary Gertrude McCoy. She had two brothers, George and Frank.

Her aunt and uncle, Nellie McCoy and Bob "Uke" Hanshaw, were vaudeville performers. She sang for guests at hotels owned by her father and demoed sheet music at her family's music store, The Melody Shop, in Mount Kisco, Westchester County, New York. Hanshaw aspired to be a portrait painter, studying at the National School of Design for a year. Her professional music career started when she was paid to sing for society and birthday parties.

Before her recording career, Hanshaw sang on local radio stations while visiting Florida with her family. She first recorded a demo for Pathé featuring a medley of popular songs. Her first commercial recordings, "Black Bottom" and "Six Feet of Papa," were recorded on September 12 and 18, 1926. She recorded for Pathé until 1928; Pathé released her records on both the Pathé and the Perfect labels.

Beginning in June 1928, Hanshaw recorded for Columbia Records; most of these recordings were issued Columbia's budget or "dime-store" labels Harmony, Diva, Clarion and Velvet Tone. A handful were also released on the regular-priced Columbia and lower priced OKeh labels. Although most were released under Hanshaw's name, she used the pseudonym Gay Ellis for sentimental numbers, and Dot Dare or Patsy Young for her Helen Kane impersonations. Hanshaw recorded under a number of other pseudonyms, including Ethel Bingham, Marion Lee, Janet Shaw and Lelia Sandford.

In August 1932, Hanshaw began recording for ARC; her recordings were issued on the Melotone, Perfect, Conqueror, Oriole and Romeo labels. Her final session, on February 3, 1934, was placed on ARC's Vocalion label.

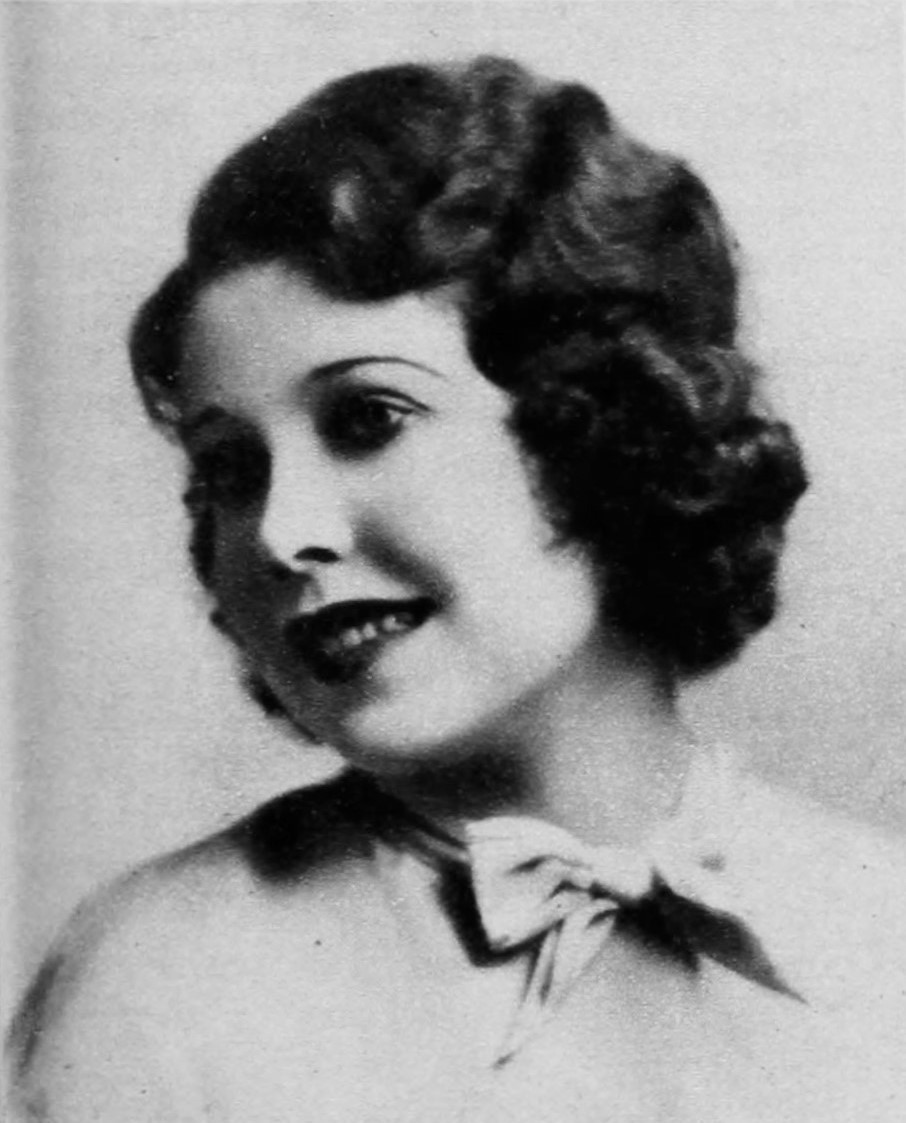
Hanshaw, c. 1933

Throughout her recording career, she sang with the Original Memphis Five, Willard Robison's Deep River Orchestra, Sam Lanin's Orchestra, Lou Gold's Orchestra, Frank Ferera's Hawaiian Trio and Rudy Vallée's Connecticut Yankees. Some of the artists whose solos were featured on her recordings were Red Nichols, Miff Mole, Phil Napoleon, Joe Venuti, Eddie Lang, Adrian Rollini, Vic Berton, Benny Goodman, Jimmy Dorsey, Tommy Dorsey, and Jack Teagarden.

In 1929, Hanshaw began performing on network radio. In the early 1930s, she sang on the air with Glen Gray's Casa Loma Orchestra. From 1932 to 1934, she was featured on the popular Thursday evening radio program Maxwell House Show Boat. She made her only film appearance in the 1933 Paramount short Captain Henry's Radio Show. On December 6, 1937 Hanshaw gave the final performance of her career on The Chevrolet Musical Moments Revue.

Hanshaw's singing style was relaxed and suited to the jazz-influenced pop music of the late 1920s and early 1930s. She combined the voice of an ingenue with the spirit of a flapper. She was known as The Personality Girl, and her trademark was saying "That's all!" in a cheery voice at the end of many of her records. Hanshaw had a low opinion of her voice and suffered from anxiety while broadcasting. When asked why, she said, "I'm so afraid I'll fail, not sing my best. Suppose I should have to cough. Suppose I didn't get just the right pitch. And all those people listening." Hanshaw's favorite singers were Marion Harris, Sophie Tucker, and Blossom Seeley. She also enjoyed her contemporaries, Ethel Waters, Ruth Etting and Connee Boswell. She composed two songs, "Sweet One" and "Till Your Happiness Comes Along." Hanshaw disliked show business. In a 1972 interview with Jack Cullen she said,

As a matter of fact, I disliked all of [my records] intensely. I was most unhappy when they were released. I just often cried because I thought they were so poor, mostly because of my work, but a great deal, I suppose, because of the recording. [...] I disliked the business intensely. I loathed it, and I'm ashamed to say I just did it for the money. I loved singing, you know, jamming with the musicians when it isn't important to do, but somehow or another I was terribly nervous when I sang. [...] You just have to be such a ham and love performing, and I happen to be an introvert, and I just wasn't happy singing, and I wasn't happy with my work as I said.

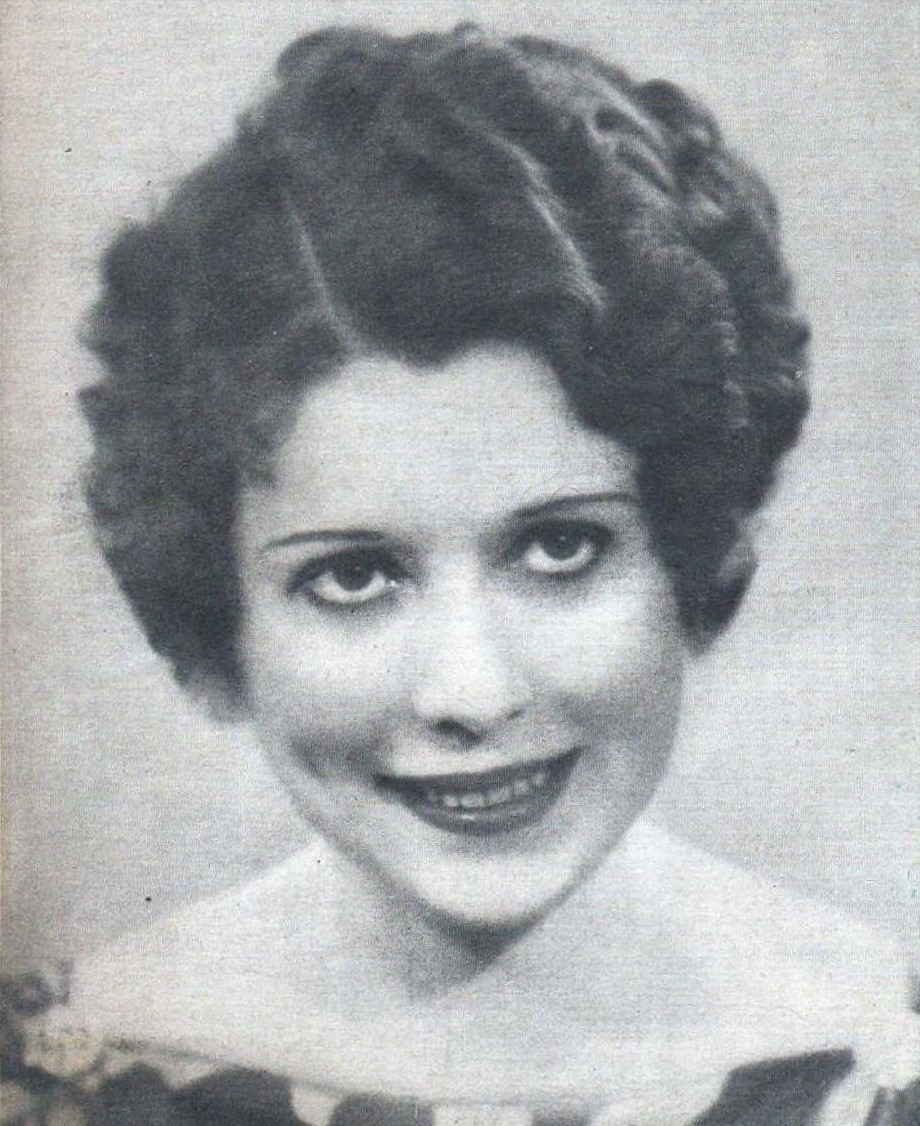
Hanshaw in 1934

Hanshaw married Pathé Records executive Herman "Wally" Rose in 1929.

== Later years ==
In 1954, Herman "Wally" Rose died. Annette Hanshaw later married Herb Kurtin. In 1985, aged 83, she died of cancer in New York City. She had no children.

== Legacy ==
Collections of Hanshaw's recordings were released on CD by Sensation Records in 1999. Another revival of interest occurred in 2008 with the use of Hanshaw's music in the animated film Sita Sings the Blues, which retells the Indian epic poem the Ramayana from Sita's perspective by setting scenes from it to performances by Hanshaw.

For many years it was believed that Hanshaw was born in 1910. The Syncopated Times lists her birthday as October 18, 1901, in New York City. Her nephew, Frank W. Hanshaw III, confirmed that 1901 is the year on her birth certificate, the last two numbers of the year having been transposed, possibly by Hanshaw herself to shave years off her true age.

== Charted discography ==
Year	Single	Group or Name / Pseudonym	Record label	Peak chart position	Total weeks charted
Year	Single	Group or Name / Pseudonym	Record label	US	Total weeks charted
1928	"For Old Times' Sake"	Frank Ferera's Hawaiian Trio; Vocal by Annette Hanshaw	Harmony	10	3
1929	"In A Great Big Way"	Gay Ellis	Harmony	19	1
1929	"Big City Blues"	Annette Hanshaw	Columbia	10	3
1929	"Am I Blue?"	Gay Ellis	Harmony	11	2
1930	"Body and Soul"	Annette Hanshaw	Harmony	12	2
