= Scranton Button Company =

Former US corporation

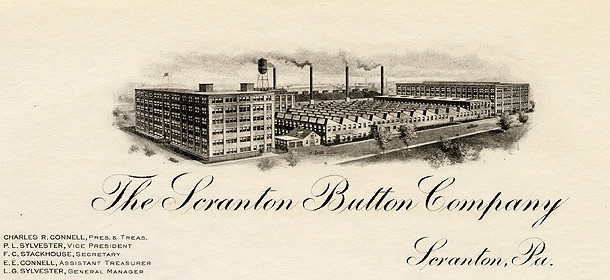
- Scranton Button Company Factory
- Type: Private company
- Industry: General manufacturer, music entertainment
- Founded: 1885 in Scranton, Pennsylvania, U.S.
- Defunct: 1946
- Fate: Acquired by Capitol Records
- Headquarters: Scranton, Pennsylvania, U.S.
- Parent: American Record Corporation

The Scranton Button Company was a U.S. corporation that was founded in Scranton, Pennsylvania, in 1885.

== History ==
For much of its early history, this company was controlled by Canadian immigrant William Connell (September 10, 1827 – March 21, 1909). Connell's family moved to Scranton when he was a small child, and, at the age of seven he left school to work in the coal industry to help support his family. When his employer's charter to state mine land lapsed, Connell purchased it and created his own company, William Connell & Co., which eventually made him wealthy. Connell became an influential Scranton businessman, which included purchasing the Scranton Button Company shortly after its founding as well as being director of that company.

In addition to buttons, the company manufactured parts for telephones and advertising novelties. By 1915, the company was pressing three million buttons per day. Many of the buttons were pressed from a shellac-based material; The same material used in pressing gramophone records. During the 1920s, the company branched out from making buttons into pressing phonograph records by expanding its use of the same material. It subsequently offered full-service record production to any retailer that desired its own label.

In August 1922, when Emerson Phonograph Co. reorganized, the Scranton Button Company bought Regal Records Co. from them. In July 1929, it merged with Regal Records Co., Cameo Records, Banner Records and the US branch of Pathé Records to form the American Record Corporation (ARC).

From 1929 on, the company pressed Brunswick, Melotone, Perfect, Banner, Regal, Domino, Conqueror, Vocalion and other ARC labels. (Even though Columbia was bought by ARC in 1934, Columbia records were pressed at Columbia's Bridgeport, CT. plant.)

In 1946, the Scranton plant was acquired by Capitol Records. Though some sources have asserted that Capitol closed the factory in 1970, the label continued to operate the plant until mid July 1973. In November of the same year, a Pittsburgh firm, North American Music Industries, Inc., purchased the former Capital Records plant, and kept the plant in business until its final closure c. 1980.

== Legacy ==
In 2017, the Scranton Button Company's former district was listed on the National Register of Historic Places with the title of "Lackawanna Mills and Scranton Button Historic District" and location of "Block bounded by Cedar Avenue, Cherry Street, Remington Avenue and Brook Street" in Scranton, PA.
