= Broadway Records (1920s) =

American record label in the 1920s and 1930s

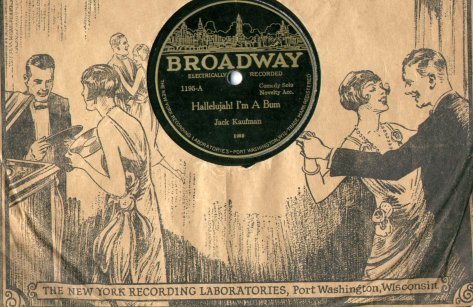
- Broadway Records paper sleeve
- Founded: 1920s
- Founder: Bridgeport Die and Machine Company
- Defunct: 1931
- Status: Inactive
- Genre: Jazz
- Country of origin: United States

Broadway Records was the name of an American record label in the 1920s and 1930s. Broadway's records were first manufactured in the early 1920s by the Bridgeport Die and Machine Company of Bridgeport, Connecticut. Most of the early issues were from masters recorded by Paramount Records. Starting in 1924, masters from the Emerson and Banner appeared on Broadway.

When Bridgeport Die and Machine went bankrupt in 1925, the Broadway label was acquired by the New York Recording Laboratories (NYRL), which, despite what the name suggests, was located in Port Washington, Wisconsin. NYRL was owned by the Wisconsin Chair Company, also the parent of Paramount Records. Broadway's discs were sold at Montgomery Ward, though it is not known if Ward's handled the label exclusively. (Examples bearing a Chicago drugstore imprint are known.) The majority of these 1925–1930 records were Plaza masters. Starting in 1930, Crown Records masters were used in addition to NYRL's own L-matrix series of sides recorded in Grafton, Wisconsin. NYRL went out of business in 1932 and the Broadway label was picked up by ARC for a short-lived series.

When Decca started up in late 1934/early 1935, among the early (unsuccessful) labels they produced was Champion and Broadway. The few Broadway/Decca records were an L-1200 series and masters came from Champion (Gennett Records) The series did not last beyond 1935. This involvement with ARC and then Decca most probably related to the fulfillment of an existing Ward's contract. The Bridgeport-era Broadway discs were well-pressed and recorded, but starting with the NYRL (Paramount) era, the pressing quality and audio fidelity was well below average for the time. The ARC Broadway quality was the same as Melotone, Perfect, or Oriole, and the Decca Broadway quality was the same as Decca.

== See also ==
- List of record labels
