= Homestead Records (1920s) =

American record company of the 1920s

Homestead Records was a United States–based record label of the 1920s and early 1930s. The first pressings were produced by the Regal Record Company and drew on the same material as Regal, Banner and related labels. Pressings were made by the Scranton Button Company. When Regal became part of the ARC merger, Homestead records were continued under the ARC umbrella of labels. In 1930, Crown supplied masters as well.

All known copies are marked "Chicago Mail Order Co.", indicating that this label was only available via mail order. Most of the repertoire is of rural interest, although some dance music was also issued.

== See also ==
- List of record labels
