= Anthony Franchini =

American guitarist

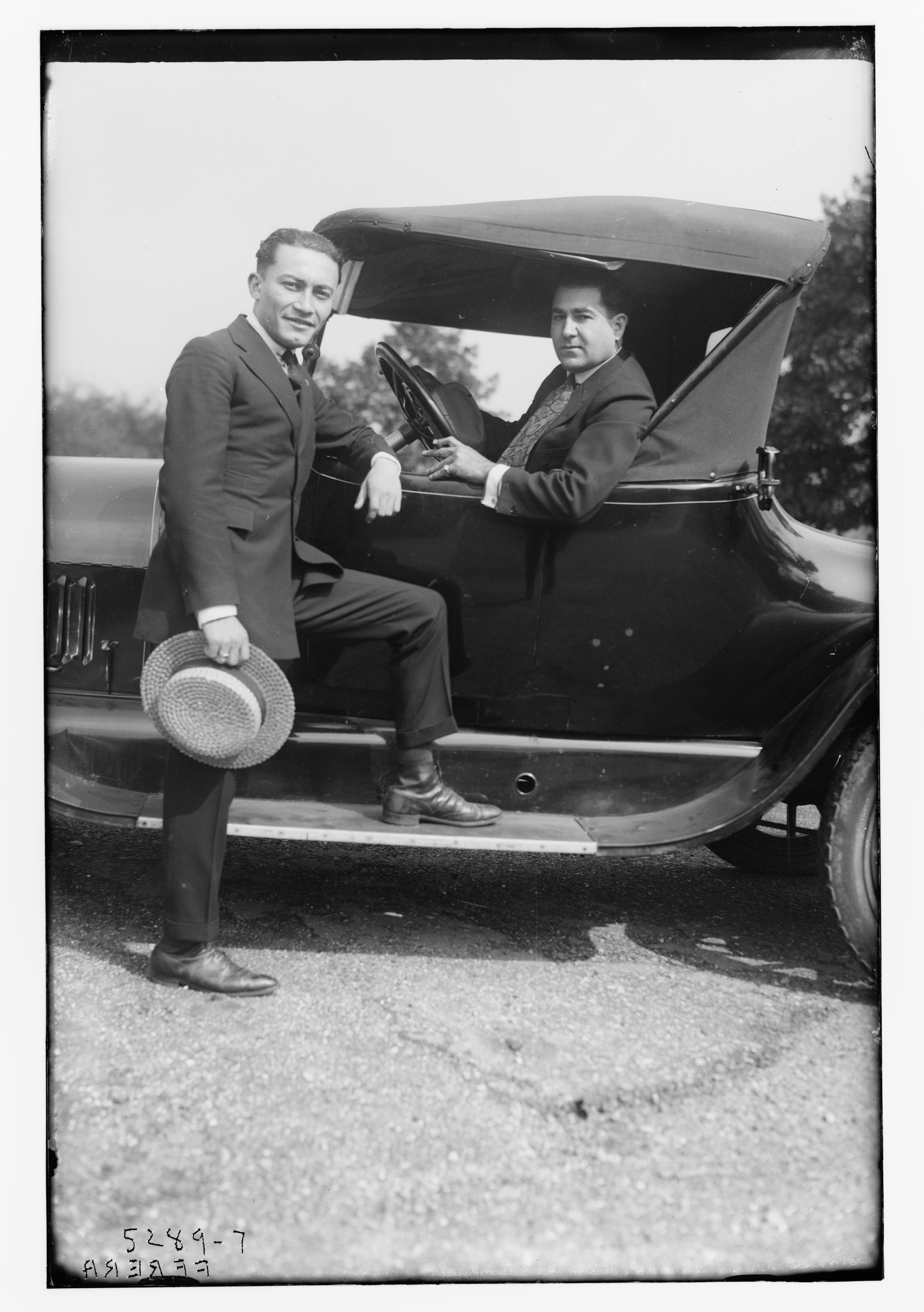
- Anthony Franchini (left) with Frank Ferera c. 1920
- Born: Antonio Giuseppe Franchini; August 2, 1898; Naples, Italy
- Died: September 17, 1997 (aged 99); Las Vegas, Nevada, USA
- Occupations: Guitarist, violinist
- Years active: 1914–1995

Anthony John Franchini (August 2, 1898 – September 17, 1997) was an American guitarist, most known for his Hawaiian guitar partnership with Frank Ferera, making him one of the most-recorded musicians of all time. After his time with Ferera, his career was remarkably varied, playing with symphony orchestras and country and western bands, often simultaneously, also working in additional genres, before retiring in his 90s.

== Biography ==
=== Early life and career ===
Antonio Giuseppe Franchini was born to Ercole, a fishmonger, and Genney Franchini in Naples, Italy, on August 2, 1898. As per Italian custom at the time, he began his formal education at age two. His family moved to Boston, United States, in 1903. In Boston he attended Elliott Grade School, and began formal violin lessons under private tutelage the following year. He taught himself mandolin and guitar as he worked out currently popular songs in recreational pursuit. He began his musical career at the age of eight in Boston. He did not finish grade school, dropping out in the eighth grade.

In 1914, Franchini joined Tony Colucci and Gus Sullo in a trio of stringed instruments. The highlight of their act was to interchange instruments, in the midst of performing, while playing "Maple Leaf Rag". They toured the Keith Circuit as "French, Fields and Foley". The act ended in 1917, as Colucci chose to relocate to New York.

Franchini joined the United States Army in June 1917, even though he was not yet a citizen of the United States. He was placed in Battery F, 5th Division of the 19th Field Artillery Regiment, where he operated a 70mm gun. He spent ten months in training at a base near Leon Springs, Texas. Sent overseas, he landed in Brest, France, and conditioned there before being sent to the Vosges for combat. He spent eight months in combat, participating in the battles of Saint-Mihiel and Château-Thierry. As part of the occupation he was assigned to Koblenz and remained there until he was discharged on October 18, 1919.

=== With Frank Ferera ===
Franchini lived in a hotel in New York City upon arriving back to the States. There, he met up again with Colucci and Sullo and the three held a jam session in Franchini's room. Frank Ferera, who resided in a room above Franchini's, overheard the music and was impressed to the point that he requested that Franchini make a record with him. Thus Franchini began recording with Ferera in 1919, a few months before Helen Louise Greenus (Ferera's wife and recording partner) disappeared at sea. Ferera asked Franchini to be his recording partner in 1920. Together they became one of the most popular recordings artists in the 1920s. Labels that released Ferrera and Franchini duets include Brunswick, Columbia, Emerson, Gennett, Lyric, Okeh, Pathé, Paramount, and Victor. During their association, the duo of "Ferera and Franchini" typically recorded four to six sessions every single day. Besides records released under their names they also recorded behind Anna Case, Vernon Dalhart, Ernest Hare, Billy Jones, and Bert Williams. Altogether, more than 3500 sides were recorded by Ferera and Franchini. On top of this, he was also an active session musician in his own right, accompanying Dalhart on some of Dalhart's early country music recordings and diversely performing Spanish music in Victor's ethnic catalog. This period of activity was financially a time of great prosperity for Franchini.

Franchini did more than make phonograph records. Ferera and Franchini worked tirelessly to learn material, it took extra time as Ferera could not read music. Fortunately Franchini was a good cook, and liked to make Itialian dishes when practicing at Ferera's living quarters. Franchini took a break from recording activities in 1924 to conduct the Nat Martin Orchestra which was supporting the Marx Brothers in the revue I'll Say She Is. In 1926 he formed a school of music in which was to last through the late 1940s, serving as its director.

Ferera abruptly decided to leave the music business in 1927, and a seven-and-a-half year partnership ended amicably. Franchni signed as a composer to the Irving Berlin publishing company. From 1928 to 1932 he was musical arranger for the RKO Pictures program on WEAF. At the same time, he was musical director for Paramount's Koko the Clown. However, the period was financially disastrous for Franchini. Previously wealthy, he lost his fortune in the Wall Street crash of 1929, and as record and publishing sales subsequently dried up in the following Great Depression, so did his formerly lucrative royalty income.

=== Post-Ferera: a varied career ===
Franchini spent the period of 1932 to 1936 concentrating on his compositions, working with Claude Hopkins and Clarence Williams, among others. Franchini wrote more than 150 compositions under the name Mel Ball. Most of them were in the Hawaiian music genre. He then spent the next two school years teaching music at Hobbs Junior High School in Medford, Massachusetts. In 1938 he returned to songwriting, including an extended idea-gathering tour through the Midwest that lasted from 1939 to 1940. He transcribed Hawaiian music into English, and wrote original songs such as "Just an Old Bouquet of a Bygone Day", "Pretending" and "Talking to My Heart", the last a collaboration with Jimmy Dorsey.

Upon the attack on Pearl Harbor, Franchini drove from his home in Medford to Camp Edwards in order to volunteer again for the armed services. He was given the rank of Corporal and assigned to the 101st Engineers Band. His service was mostly non-musical. He was sent to Jefferson Barracks Military Post where he became a drill sergeant, teaching obstacle course and arms nomenclature. During his World War Two service, he became a naturalized U.S. citizen in 1942. He was never sent overseas before his discharge on May 15, 1943.

His next stop was in Houston, where he joined a trio that was the resident entertainment at Houston's Cotton Club. Soon afterwards, he joined the Houston Symphony as a violinist under Ernst Hoffmann. He attended the University of Houston at this time, taking studies in Italian and Social Studies.

Franchini moved to New Orleans in 1946, under contract with Ted Phillips Orchestra at the Jung Hotel. Later in the year he was booked at the Mirror Room in the Alexandria, Louisiana Bentley Hotel. Here he was partnered with organist/showgirl Princess White Cloud for what was originally to be two weeks, but the popularity of the show extended the contract to four months, upon which Princess White Cloud had to leave because of a previous agreement with a circus.

Franchini found himself in Shreveport, Louisiana, when he met Hank Williams. Williams knew Franchini by reputation as a Hawaiian guitarist and a classical violinist, but asked Franchini if he could do a "hoe down". Franchini proceeded to play one, and a surprised Williams was so impressed he immediately requested that Franchini join his touring group, an offer which was accepted. Franchini, under the pseudonym Tony Zachary, played fiddle for Hank Williams from 1949 to 1951. Williams, with Franchini in tow, toured as a unit with Hank Snow and the Bailes Brothers.

In between tours, he spent time in Los Angeles, playing at clubs. In his spare time he learned German and improved his Spanish at the Berlitz School of Languages. He joined the Henry Busse orchestra in 1951 as lead violinist, touring California, Nevada, and Nebraska. Franchini left Busse in May 1953 in order to form another combo under his own control. In-between tours with Busse he played with the Phoenix Symphony and the El Paso Symphony orchestras. He spent 1953 playing nightclubs. Then he spent the following two years with the Tucson Symphony Orchestra, while simultaneously playing Western music in nightclubs. At the end of 1955, Franchini moved to Las Vegas, where he played for the Dunes Hotel as it opened, played at the Sahara for four weeks accompanying Marlene Dietrich, and finished the year with the Jimmie Durante show at the Desert Inn. It was back to California in 1956, where he teamed with Ace and Duece Spriggins, formerly of the Sons of the Pioneers, and together they played for private occasions around Palm Springs and at the Mirador Hotel there.

Franchini left the Spriggins, as he desired to relocate back to New York City. Franchini went back to school, and in 1957 earned a college degree in biochemistry. He further expanded his musical repertoire when he played rock and roll as part of the Sampson Horton Orchestra on Jay Gee Records. The next three years (1958–1961) were of a more sedate musical persuasion, as they were spent touring with the Mantovani orchestra. This was in turn followed by more road time with the national touring production of The Sound of Music.

=== Later life and career ===
Franchini converted to the Church of Jesus Christ of Latter-day Saints in 1966. He moved to Las Vegas in the 1970s, where he became an activist for the Republican Party, campaigning for Ronald Reagan and George H. W. Bush and volunteering at election day polls into his 90s. Franchini worked in many casino orchestras, and in his 80s also supplemented his income as a strolling violinist for local Las Vegas restaurants. In 1983, he re-arranged "The Star-Spangled Banner", as he felt the song too difficult to sing for most people. The Nevada members of the United States Congress presented this arrangement to three presidents in hopes it would be considered. His last musical engagement was as a mandolinist as part of a trio while in his 90s.

Franchini died at the age of 99 on September 17, 1997, at a Las Vegas hospital. He is buried at Veterans Memorial Cemetery in Boulder City, Nevada. His scrapbooks and other memorabilia were donated to the University of Nevada, Las Vegas.

== Personal life ==
Franchini was married three times, each of which ended in divorce. Franchini enjoyed robust health into his late 90s; he regularly drove until he broke a hip aged 97.
