= Miss Frankie =

American blues singer who recorded in 1926 and 1927

- Also known as: Jane Howard, Lizzie Miles
- Genres: Classic female blues
- Occupation: Singer
- Instrument: Vocals
- Years active: 1920s
- Labels: Grey Gull, Banner, Domino, Regal, Victor, Conqueror

Miss Frankie was an American classic female blues singer. She recorded eight sides in 1926 and 1927.

Speculation still persists as to the real identity of the recording artist. Nothing is known of her life outside of the recording studio.

== Career ==
The first four songs known to have been recorded, billed as by Miss Frankie, were "I Need a Good Man Bad", "I Can't Be Worried Long", recorded in December 1926; plus "You Can't Guess How Good It Is ('Till You Try It for Yourself)", and "Those Creeping Sneaking Blues", which had been recorded in May that year. It has been suggested that "I Need a Good Man Bad" and "I Can't Be Worried Long", are two tracks that the pianist Eubie Blake probably played accompaniment on. "I Need a Good Man Bad" b/w "I Can't Be Worried Long" was issued in 1927 on the Boston-based Grey Gull Records (7021). It is this output that is referred to in the publication, All Music Guide to the Blues: The Definitive Guide to the Blues.

They were all included on the compilation album Female Blues Singers Vol 6 E/F/G 1922 - 1928, issued by Document Records originally in 1997, and later on CD in March 2009 (DOC5510). Three of the tracks (excluding "Those Creeping Sneaking Blues") were also included on the various artists album, The Roots of Billie Holiday - Ladies Sing the Blues of The 1920s (2008).

It is thought, although not proven, that the recordings were probably by Jane Howard. One publication suggested that 'Miss Frankie' was a pseudonym used by Jane Howard on recordings for Banner, Domino and Regal record labels. AllMusic stated "Jane Howard probably being the same person as Miss Frankie". Another source proffered that the later accompanist to Miss Frankie [Jane Howard] was Happy Holmes, with Banner issuing three titles and Victor Records another two. It was not unusual at the time for songs to appear on more than one record label.

She recorded three sides; "Kissin' Mule Blues", "Peepin' Jim Blues" and "Hard Hearted Papa" in New York in September 1927. "Mean Old Bedbug Blues" was recorded in October that year. A single was released of "Peepin' Jim Blues" b/w "When You Get Tired of Your New Sweetie" by Banner Records, with both sides credited to 'Miss Frankie'.

"Peepin' Jim Blues" and "Hard Hearted Papa" both appeared on another compilation album Female Blues Singers, Vol. 10, H/I/J (1923-1929) issued by Document Records (March 1997).

== Confusion ==
There is further uncertainty in that some sources suggest that several of the 'Miss Frankie' recordings were the work of Lizzie Miles. This particularly applies to the tracks "When You Get Tired of Your New Sweetie", and "Shooting Star Blues", issued on Conqueror Records (January 1928).

== Discography ==
- "You Can't Guess How Good It Is ('Till You Try It for Yourself)" (May 1926)
- "Those Creeping Sneaking Blues" (May 1926)
- "I Need a Good Man Bad" (December 1926)
- "I Can't Be Worried Long" (December 1926)
- "Peepin' Jim Blues" (September 1927)
- "Kissin' Mule Blues" (September 1927)
- "Hard Hearted Papa" (September 1927)
- "Mean Old Bedbug Blues" (October 1927)

== See also ==
- List of classic female blues singers
