= Oriole Records =

Oriole Records may refer to:

- Oriole Records (U.S.), a record label of the 1920s and 1930s
- Oriole Records (UK), founded in 1925 and taken over in 1964
