= The Four Aristocrats =

American musical band

The Four Aristocrats were a popular United States musical act in the 1920s and 1930s. They were vaudeville stars and made numerous phonograph records for the Victor, and Banner record companies. The group consisted of Bert Bennet, Eddie Lewis, Tom Miller, and Fred Weber.

The group's songs appeared along with artists like Ralph Haines, Roy Smeck, Paul Whiteman's Rhythm Boys. The group appeared in early talking motion pictures, including four Vitaphone Varieties musical shorts produced by Warner Brothers and Modern Song and Syncopation (1927).

== Selected discography ==
- "Bells Of Hawaii" (1927)
- "Don't Sing Aloha When I Go" (1926)
- "Everybody Loves My Girl" (1928)
- "I Gotta Get Myself Somebody To Love" (1927)
- "Just Like A Melody Out Of The Sky" (1928)
- "On A Mountain Trail In Old Hawaii" (?)
- "She's Still My Baby" (1926)
- "Schultz Is Back (With His Boom! Boom! Boom!)" (1927)
- "Voom Voom (Moaden On The Gayden)" (1927)
