= Lou Gold =

Polish-American composer, pianist, and band leader (1885–1950)

- Born: 1885; Łódź, Poland
- Died: 1950 Miami, Florida, U.S.

Lewis Milton Goldwasser (1885–1950), better known by his stage name Lou Gold, was a composer, pianist and band leader popular in New York City from the late-1910s to the early 1930s. His orchestra was an all-white band (as were most of the commercially successful bands in those days due to the limitations placed on African American musicians at the time) playing African American music active at first during the late 1910s and early 1920s in live music venues.

== Career ==
In March 1924, Lou Gold and His Orchestra made a recording for Cameo Records, the first of many he produced through 1932.

Over the years, his birth name of Lewis Milton Goldwasser metamorphosed first into Lew Gold, then Lou Gold, and finally into Louis M. Gould (the name that appears on his tombstone). In 1932, he and his wife Doris A. Mabel (Reynolds) Gould, relocated to Miami, Florida, where he played at the Triton Hotel in Miami Beach for seven years. Lou died in 1950, and his wife followed him in 1951. He worked with Benny Goodman, Vincent Lopez, Tommy Dorsey, Abe Lyman, and many others.

== Discography ==
He made numerous recordings with Columbia records.
