= Shell Chateau =

1935-1937 musical variety radio series

Al Jolson rehearses for an April 1935 Shell Chateau broadcast.

Shell Chateau was a musical variety radio series heard on NBC from April 6, 1935 to June 26, 1937. Sponsored by Shell Oil, the hour-long program, sometimes called The Shell Show, was broadcast on Saturday evenings at 9:30pm.

== Al Jolson ==
Al Jolson was the host when the show debuted April 6, 1935, with Jolson singing the opening theme song, "Golden Gate". The format usually featured a song by Jolson, a comedy routine, a singing guest performer, more music, another Jolson song and a dramatic sketch, followed by more Jolson. Film stars often did scenes from a movie they were promoting. Victor Young was the orchestra leader, with Ernie Watson and his orchestra on later shows.

== Title ==
Carroll Carroll was the writer-producer for the J. Walter Thompson agency with Herb Polesie directing. Carroll devised the unusual title because the sponsor wanted its name in the title, and programs at the time sometimes attempted to create the illusion that they were emanating from a luxurious hotel or an exotic location. The J. Walter Thompson agency was responsible for pioneering several big-name variety programs, including The Chase and Sanborn Hour, The Fleischmann's Yeast Hour and the Kraft Music Hall.

== Other hosts and guests ==
On March 6, 1936, when Jolson left the series, the ratings dropped considerably. It continued until June 26, 1937, with other hosts, including Walter Winchell, Wallace Beery, Edward Everett Horton, Smith Ballew and Joe Cook. The announcers included Foster Williams.

Guests included Louis Armstrong, John Barrymore, Lionel Barrymore, Ben Blue, Bette Davis, Joan Davis, Judy Garland (who made two 1935 appearances in the same month), Florence Gill (doing her Walt Disney animation chicken voices), George Jessel, Boris Karloff, Dixie Lee, Joe E. Lewis (who was a guest four times), John McCormack, Maxie Rosenbloom, Joe Penner, Eleanor Powell (doing a Katharine Hepburn impression), Ginger Rogers, Babe Ruth, Benay Venuta (who became a network performer as a result of her 1935 appearance), Fats Waller, Johnny Weissmuller, June Marlowe, Midge Williams and Lee Wiley.

== Listen to ==
- Internet Archive: Shell Chateau
