= American Record Corporation =

American record company

- Type: Incentive
- Predecessor: Scranton Button Works
- Founded: July 25, 1929; 97 years ago United States
- Defunct: December 17, 1938; 87 years ago
- Fate: Acquired for $700,000 in cash and stock by Columbia Broadcasting System Inc.
- Successor: Columbia Recording Corporation May 1939
- Headquarters: United States
- Parent: Sony Music Entertainment

American Record Corporation (ARC), also referred to as American Record Company, American Recording Corporation, or ARC Records, was an American record company in operation from 1929 to 1938, and again from 1978 to 1982.

== Overview ==
ARC was created in January 1929 by Louis G. Sylvester, president of Scranton Button Works ('Scranton'), founded 1885. Scranton owned a pressing plant that manufactured discs for many companies, including Columbia labels and Emerson Records, the latter which it also owned. It then purchased Cameo Record Corporation, which owned the Cameo, Lincoln and Romeo labels), and six labels owned by the Plaza Music Company (Conqueror, Banner, Domino, Jewel, Oriole, and Regal). for $1 each, including liabilities. Pathé-Perfect Phonograph and Radio Corporation, which owned Actuelle, Pathé, and Perfect, was also purchased. 'American Record Corporation' was incorporated in Delaware on July 25, 1929, as a subsidiary of Consolidated Film Industries, Inc. ("CFI"). Louis G. Sylvester became the president of the new company, located at 1776 Broadway in Manhattan, New York City.

== Columbia Phonograph Company US ownership ==
In March 1925, Louis Sterling, managing director of the UK Columbia Graphophone Company, backed by J.P. Morgan & Co., acquired a controlling interest in the parent company, Columbia Phonograph Company (U.S.), for $2.5 million, in order to purchase the license for new Western Electric patents that Columbia US could not afford. The British firm controlled US operations from 1925 until 1931. Sterling, originally from New York, became chairman.

The repercussions of the stock market Crash of 1929 led to huge losses in the recording industry and, in March 1931, J.P Morgan, the major shareholder, steered the Columbia Graphophone Company (along with Odeon Records and Parlophone, which it had owned since 1926) into a merger with the Gramophone Company ( ("His Master's Voice") to form Electric and Musical Industries Ltd (EMI). Since the Gramophone Company (HMV) was a wholly owned subsidiary of Victor, and Columbia in America was a subsidiary of UK Columbia, Victor now technically owned its largest rival in the US. To avoid antitrust legislation, EMI had to sell off its US Columbia operation, which continued to release pressings of matrices made in the UK.

In December, 1931, the U.S. Columbia Phonograph Company, Inc. was sold to the Grigsby-Grunow Company, the manufacturers of Majestic radios and refrigerators. When Grigsby-Grunow was declared bankrupt in November 1933, Columbia was placed in receivership, and in June 1934, the company was sold to Sacro Enterprises Inc. ("Sacro") for $70,000. Sacro was incorporated a few days before the sale in New York. Public documents do not contain any names. Many suspect that it was a shell corporation set up by ARC's parent, Consolidated Films Industries, Inc. to hold the Columbia stock. This assumption grew out of the ease which CFI later exhibited in selling Columbia in 1938.

== Brunswick Radio Corporation purchased by Warner Bros. Pictures Inc. ==
On April 9, 1930, the Brunswick-Balke-Collender Company sold its Brunswick and Vocalion trademarks, patents, master recordings, inventory of unsold records, recording studio leases, radio/phonograph manufacturing plants and record pressing plants to Warner Bros. Pictures Inc. (WB), which named its new division the Brunswick Radio Corporation. The price was $10 million.

According to a book co-authored by Jack Warner, Jr., Warner Bros. Pictures "bought the radio, record and phonograph divisions of Brunswick-Balke-Collender Company for the company's patents, its record factory, and its 16mm home talkie projector". Before they came to their senses, it was all moved across the country to WB's Sunset studio. WB soon realized it was a terrible mistake; it lost $8 million on the Brunswick deal.

Melotone, a subsidiary label of the Brunswick Radio Corporation, was introduced late in 1930. "Brunswick is the first of the big-three disc companies to go into the market shortly with a double-faced disc to sell at 25 cents. Plate is called the Melotone," reported Variety. "Policy of Melotone will be the biggest song, to be delivered as cheaply as possible. No literature or advertising campaigns; cheap nut, quantity is the goal."

WB wanted to withdraw from the record business, but economic conditions had deteriorated to the point where no buyer would offer anything close to the $10,000,000 they'd paid for Brunswick just the year before. Unwilling to take a huge loss, an agreement was entered into with Consolidated Film Industries, the parent company of ARC, on December 3, 1931, whereby the record company's artist and staff employment contracts were transferred, and the Brunswick, Vocalion and Melotone trademarks and catalog of master recordings were loaned, to the "Brunswick Record Corporation," a newly-formed holding company controlled by ARC.

While WB was to be paid a fee on sales of records pressed from Brunswick, Vocalion and Melotone masters recorded prior to December 3, 1931, ARC was permitted to release its own master recordings on the Brunswick, Vocalion and Melotone labels free of charge. The agreement effectively fixed the minimum retail price of a 10-inch Brunswick record at 75 cents, but allowed ARC free rein to set prices for Vocalion and Melotone (The price of Melotone nonetheless stayed at 25 cents.) In the event that fewer than 250,000 Brunswick records were pressed and sold in the U.S. and Canada during any one-year period, the agreement provided that control of the trademarks and catalog of Brunswick, Vocalion and Melotone masters recorded through December 2, 1931, would revert to WB. Brunswick would become ARC's premium label.

== Columbia Broadcasting System Inc. acquires American Record Corporation ==
On December 17, 1938, American Record Corporation was purchased for $700,000 by the Columbia Broadcasting System Inc. (CBS). Edward Wallerstein was named president on January 3, 1939. On April 4, 1939 CBS filed an amendment in New York for Columbia Phonograph Company, Inc.

Columbia Phonograph Company Inc. has been chartered to conduct a business in the recording of voices, sounds, etc., in New York, with Frank K. White and Adrian Murphy (employees of CBS), among the directors. Attorney Ralph F. CoUn, 165 Broadway, is third director. White owns four shares; the others three apiece. Capitol stock is $10,000, $10 par value. Rosenberg, Goldmlark, & Colin are filing attorneys.

Above incorporation represents the formal change of name of CBS' phonograph subsidiary. The American Record Co. tag is discarded and instead of three corporations embracing the ARC'S various operations there will be one, the Columbia Phonograph Co., Inc. The latter label was taken over by Herbert J. Yates, former head of the American Record Co. several years ago and made file insignia of the combine's classical catelog. The indications are that the Columbia label will be returned to the popular field, replacing Brunswick as the company's fee popular record.

On May 22, 1939, Columbia Recording Corporation Inc., was incorporated with the State of Delaware, and became the CBS phonograph subsidiary. The New York Department of State shows a later incorporation date of April 4, 1947. This corporation changed its name to Columbia Records Inc. on October 11, 1954, and reverted to CRC on January 2, 1962.

== Columbia Recording Corporation ==
Studios were established at 799 7th Avenue, New York City, along with corporate offices at 1473 Barnum Avenue, Bridgeport, CT. Also in February, John Hammond was hired by Wallerstein as Associate Director Popular Recording. Another executive from ARC, Art Satherley, was not expected to transition over as easily. Fortunately, to the delight of many, this did not happen, and Art went on to many more successful years. Hammond hired Benny Goodman away from Victor to record for the Columbia label. Then came an announcement August 30, 1939, "Columbia drops its Brunswick label at 75c in favor of a 50c platter tagged Columbia, with the issuing of the first of the platters cut by Benny Goodman Sept 3". Brunswick was gradually phased out, the final issue being Brunswick 8520, in April 1940.

As sales of Brunswick records declined, a minimum threshold required by the 1931 Warner Bros. lease agreement was going unmet, which obliged Columbia to also discontinue Vocalion. The final Vocalion issued under Columbia's aegis, number 5621, was released July 5, 1940. It was priced at 35 cents, as was the next record in the series, OKeh 05622. Okeh Records was revived in June 1940, acquired in the same 1934 bankruptcy sale whereby ARC obtained its Columbia trademarks. By July, it was releasing new Hillbilly platters by Gene Autry and Bob Wills, and re-issuing past Vocalion discs, using the same catalogue numbers with a leading zero added. Okeh was extremely successful until it was merged into the parent label in 1945. When a January 1941 audit found that not more than 150,000 Brunswick records had sold during the period from December 1, 1939, through December 31, 1940, control of the loaned trademarks and catalog of master recordings made prior to December 3, 1931, reverted to Warner Bros. Pictures

== Brunswick and Vocalion purchased by Decca Records Inc. ==
On May 2, 1941, Decca Records Executive Milton Rackmil bought Brunswick Radio Corporation from Warner Bros. for $350,000, which included Brunswick, Vocalion and Melotone masters from label inception to December 1931. Decca reactivated the labels for limited purposes from time to time, but it was the valuable catalogues it really wanted. Brunswick masters included Isham Jones, Al Jolson, early Duke Ellington, Louis Armstrong, and Marion Harris, but it was obscure Jacques Rennard and His Orchestra that had recorded "As Time Goes By" in 1931. Decca re-released it in 1943, to capitalize on Casablanca's (1942) theme music. Because of the American Federation of Musicians' 1942–1944 musicians' strike, which resulted in a ban on studio recording, the only recordings the major labels could find were the Rennard and a July 1931 rendition by Rudy Vallee and His Connecticut Yankees that was released by Victor. Both finished in the top 25 of 1943, with Renard's version selling over 250,000 copies, making Decca management so happy that it gave him a $1,000 bonus, even though he hadn't recorded for years. His record's sales more than paid for the Brunswick Radio Corporation purchase. Rackmil was also promoted and named to the Decca board of directors.

== ARC re-activated ==
During August 1978 ARC was reactivated by Columbia as Maurice White's vanity label. Acts such as Earth, Wind & Fire, Weather Report, Deniece Williams, Pockets, and the Emotions were signed to the label. One of the label's final releases was Earth, Wind & Fire's 1981 album Raise!

As of 2019, the ARC legacy is now part of Sony Music Entertainment.

== Labels ARC issued or pressed (1929–1938) ==
Labels that existed prior to the formation of ARC are marked +

- ARC (sold to theaters for background and intermission music 1931–1933?, 1978–1982 vanity label for Maurice White)
- Banner +1929–1938
- Bernardo (client label)
- Broadway +from 1932 (fulfilling a contract with Montgomery Ward after Paramount ceased production)
- Brunswick +1932–1938 (under lease agreement from Warner Bros. Pictures)
- Cameo +1929–1930
- Columbia +late 1934–1938
- Commodore (client label for Commodore Music Shops)
- Conqueror +(client label for Sears from 1929–1938)
- Domino +1929–1931 (but was restarted as a client label for the John Gabel Co. circa 1933–34)
- Fox Movietone (client label sold only at Fox Theaters, taken over from Victor, circa 1934)
- Gospel Herald (client label)
- Gramophone Shop Varieties (client label for The Gramophone Shop)
- Hollywood 1936–1937 (client label)
- Homestead +(mail order label 1929 to circa 1931, when it was taken over by Crown Records)
- Hot Record Society (client label for the Hot Record Society)
- Jewel +1929 to circa 1932
- Liberty Music Shops (client label for the Liberty Music Shops)
- Lincoln +from 1929–1930
- Master 1937
- Mel-O-Dee (client label as a specialty jukebox label for Will F. Dillion Associates, Inc.) 1931
- Melotone +1932–1938
- Oriole +1929–1938 (client label for McCrory)
- Paramount +1932 to circa 1934. Pressed last of the 13000 series and the short-lived 9000 series
- Pathé +1929–1930
- Perfect +1929–1938
- Regal +1929–1931
- Romeo +1929–1938 (client label for Kress Stores)
- Shamrock Stores – (client label for the Shamrock Stores)
- Supertone +1930 to circa 1931 (client label for Sears whose short-lived series made by Brunswick after the Gennett period ended. This rare series probably hails from right before the ARC takeover of Brunswick)
- U.H.C.A. – (client label specializing in reissues for United Hot Clubs of America through Commodore)
- Variety 1937
- Vocalion +1932–1938 (under lease agreement from Warner Bros. Pictures)

== See also ==
- Lists of record labels
