= Domino Records (1924) =

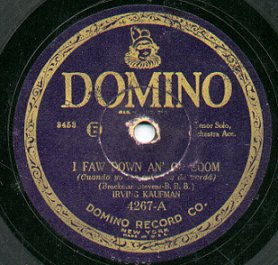
- The Label Of Domino Records, Late-1920s
- Parent company: Plaza Music Company
- Founded: 1924 (Original); 1932 (Reboot)
- Defunct: 1930 (Original); 1933 (Reboot)
- Status: Defunct
- Distributors: Plaza Music Company (1924 — July, 1929); American Record Corporation (July, 1929 — 1933)
- Genre: Jazz
- Country of origin: United States
- Location: New York City

Domino Records was an American record label, in existence from 1924 to 1933.

Domino Records, a United States–based label, was in business from 1924 to 1933, producing standard 10-inch lateral cut 78s. The label was formed as Domino Record Company, a subsidiary of Plaza Music Company, headquartered in New York City. The first issues appeared on the market in April or May 1924, and were announced to the trade press June of that year. Initially the records were pressed on red shellac, as an alternative to Regal and Banner which were standard black. For its first year Domino was priced more cheaply than either Banner or Regal, but in 1925 the prices of the latter two was dropped to 35 cents in order to be equal to Domino. In 1927 Domino records were switched to black shellac towards the latter part of the year.

At Plaza's takeover by the American Record Corporation, its trademarks passed to that company, and Domino was one of the labels that were weeded out at the time, production ceasing in 1930. ARC reconstituted the Domino label in 1932 – this time with the same label style, but in black ink on gold – for an exclusive 100 series sold only through juke box manufacturers the John Gabel Company. This format lasted until 1933. This gold label series is fairly rare; it's possible that this special series was started as Regal's short-lived final 100 series.

Artists Plaza recorded included the standard pool of New York studio orchestras led by Sam Lanin, Fred Rich, and others, as well as a handful of name bands like Ben Pollack and Cab Calloway, who also appeared on other Plaza labels such as Banner and Perfect. Recordings by the Original New Orleans Jazz Band appear on Domino.

Initial recordings were mainly sourced from Plaza, and some were sourced from New York Recording Laboratories. Early research had indicated that some recordings were made for Domino's exclusive use, but subsequent investigation revealed that Regal's matrices had merely been re-numbered for Domino.

== See also ==
- List of record labels
