= Supertone Records =

Defunct American record label

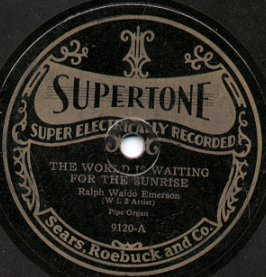
- Founded: 1920
- Location: United States

Supertone Records was an American record label in the 1920s. Supertone Records were marketed by Sears, Roebuck & Co. in 1924 and again in 1929–1931. Supertone was one of several record disc brand names marketed by Sears. Supertone records were initially made by the Fletcher Record Company in 1924. The discs produced by Fletcher included midwestern dance bands. When Fletcher failed in mid–1924, Bridgeport Die & Machine Company began producing Supertone discs in late 1924.

Sears did not register the Supertone brand name for record production, and after Sears discontinued marketing the records, the Chicago store Straus & Schram used the name, exclusively selling records produced by Regal (Scranton Button Company), Paramount Records, then in Grey Gull between 1925 and 1928. In 1926, Pathé Records supplied pressings until late 1927–early 1928, when Columbia's Harmony division started a 1000–S series of Supertone records until mid–1928 when Sears restarted their Supertone series (then Straus & Schram Supertone's renamed Puritone).

Sears claimed and marketed the brand again in 1928. Between 1928 and through 1930, Gennett pressed Supertone Records using their own masters. When Gennett was discontinued in late 1930, Sears contracted with Brunswick Radio Corporation to produce Supertone Records, which lasted through 1931. The 1928–1930 Gennett pressed Supertone discs are most commonly seen. The earlier versions, as well as the short-lived Brunswick versions, are quite scarce.

== See also ==
- List of record labels
