= Lincoln Records =

American record label (1923–1930)

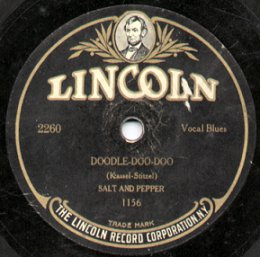
- Trade name: Lincoln
- Company type: Private
- Industry: record label (1924-1930, 1949-present); Entertainment (1924-present)
- Genre: Jazz
- Founded: 1924; United States
- Headquarters: United States
- Number of locations: United States; International
- Area served: Worldwide
- Website: Lincoln Records on the Internet Archive's Great 78 Project

Lincoln Records was an American record label that existed from 1923 to 1930.

The bulk of material on Lincoln was dance music by bands assembled from the pool of New York musicians. Lincoln Records filled a market niche for people who wanted inexpensive, danceable records of popular tunes and did not particularly care who recorded them. Lincoln records initially retailed for 50 cents each. The label had a drawing of Abraham Lincoln on the top. Although the labels said that they were made by the Lincoln Record Corporation, New York, Lincoln was actually owned by Cameo Records. Some Lincoln issues were pressed from Cameo masters, although the name of the band which recorded for Cameo was usually changed to a pseudonym so that the Lincolns would not compete with those on Cameo.

The Lincoln Records label debuted in 1924 and was discontinued in 1930. It reappeared in 1949, probably revived by the American Record Corporation which had acquired Cameo years earlier. Through the mid-1950s some children's records and music by less well known artists was released on 45-rpm discs with the Lincoln name.

Over the years, of those records issued on Cameo and Lincoln, the Cameo records are much more commonly found, making Lincoln a rather scarce label.

Artists on the label included Salt and Pepper, Ray Hamilton, the Lincoln Dance Orchestra, the Broadway Broadcasters, the Hawaiian Gondoliers, The Rangers, and Frances Sper.

== See also ==
- List of record labels
