= Jewel Records (New York record label) =

Plaza/ARC record label

- Parent company: Plaza Music Company
- Founded: 1927
- Defunct: 1932
- Status: Defunct
- Genre: Jazz
- Country of origin: U.S.
- Location: New York

Jewel Records was a record label started in 1927 by the Plaza Music Company. With other Plaza properties, it became part of the American Record Corporation in 1929. It released records until 1932. Musicians on the label included Roy Collins, Hugh Donovan, Ernie Hare, Larry Holton, Billie Jones, the Dixie Jazz Band, and the Yankee Ten Orchestra.

== See also ==
- List of record labels
