= Scrappy Lambert =

American dance-band vocalist (1901–1987)

Harold "Scrappy" Lambert
- Birth name: Harold Rodman Lambert
- Also known as: Burt Lorin
- Born: May 12, 1901; New Brunswick, New Jersey
- Died: November 30, 1987 (aged 86); Riverside, California
- Genres: Jazz
- Occupation: Vocalist
- Instrument(s): tenor voice, piano

Harold "Scrappy" Lambert (May 12, 1901 – November 30, 1987) was an American dance-band vocalist who appeared on hundreds of recordings from the 1920s to the 1940s.

At Rutgers University, he was a cheerleader and played piano for a jazz group, the Rutgers Jazz Bandits. In February 1925, fellow student Billy Hillpot and he formed a musical duo impersonating the Smith Brothers. They were discovered in 1926 by Ben Bernie, who signed them to perform with his orchestra. Lambert and Hillpot appeared on many recordings with the orchestra and remained under Bernie's employ until 1928.

Other bandleaders who employed Lambert include Red Nichols, Frank Britton Wenzel, Fred Rich, and Sam Lanin.

In the 1920s and early 1930s, Lambert was one of the most prolific "band vocalists" (hired to sing the vocal chorus on recordings by both performing orchestras and studio groups). His voice is featured on hundreds of recordings and a series of vocal solo recordings for Brunswick.

In the 1930s, Lambert and Hillpot took their comedy routine to the National Broadcasting Company. Appeared with NBC, alongside Tom Howard on the Musical Grocery Store Program in 1933. In 1943, MCA offered Lambert a job overseeing their radio department in Beverly Hills, California. This marked the end of his singing career, and he worked for MCA until 1948. He was living in Palm Springs at the time of his death, in Riverside, California.

"Cheerio, Cherry Lips, Cheerio", a 1929 vocal that Lambert recorded under the name Gordon Wallace, has been the closing theme of Dr. Demento's weekly radio broadcast since the early 1970s.
