= Cameo Records =

American record label

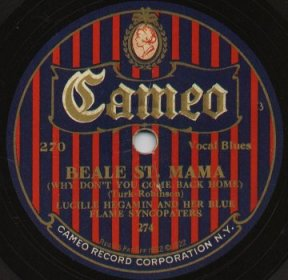
- Parent company: Cameo Record Corporation
- Founded: 1921
- Defunct: 1930
- Status: Inactive
- Genre: Jazz, blues
- Country of origin: U.S.
- Location: New York City, U.S.

Cameo Records was an American record label that flourished in the 1920s. It was owned by the Cameo Record Corporation in New York City.

Cameo released a disc by Lucille Hegamin every two months from 1921 to 1926. Cameo Records are also noted for dance music. The catalogue also included the Original Memphis Five and the Varsity Eight. Musicians such as Red Nichols, Miff Mole, Adrian Rollini, and Frank Signorelli made trips to the Cameo studios. In 1926, Cameo started recording using a microphone-electrical process. An interesting blues number is 583, "Crazy Blues", by Salt & Pepper.

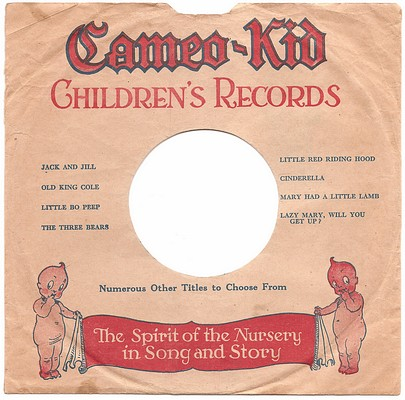

The Cameo Record Corporation started Lincoln Records (1924) and Romeo Records (1926). Cameo-Kid was a subsidiary of Cameo Records, marketing recordings intended for children. Cameo-Kid used professional artists with known names in their recordings, including star Vaudeville singers and noted dance-band musicians. This was unlike some other early Children's records labels, which tended to feature recordings by unnamed and undistinguished talent. Cameo-Kid artists probably recorded these discs while in the Cameo studios for recording more mainstream records. Cameo-Kid Records are double-sided 7-inch gramophone records.

In 1928 it merged with Pathé Records, and then the American Record Corporation. The resulting company stopped using the Cameo name in the 1930s.

This label is not affiliated with Cameo-Parkway Records which was active in the 1950s and 1960s.

== See also ==
- List of record labels
