= Banner Records =

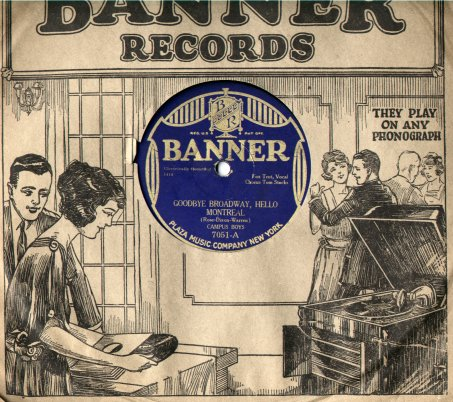
- Banner Record Sleeve, 1920s.
- Parent company: Plaza Music Company
- Founded: 1922
- Defunct: 1938
- Status: Inactive
- Genre: Popular music, jazz, blues
- Country of origin: U.S.
- Location: New York City

Banner Records was an American record company and label in the 1920s and 1930s. It was created primarily for the S.S. Kresge Company, though it was employed as a budget label in other discount stores.

== History ==
Banner was formed in January 1922 as the flagship label of the Plaza Music Company of New York City. Plaza Music produced several cheap labels targeted at discount houses and hired bandleader Adrian Schubert as musical director. At the beginning, Banner concentrated on popular dance hits, though it also recorded comedy, semi-classical music, and a small number of country and blues records. In its first years Banner also leased masters from Paramount Records and Emerson Records.

In July 1929 Plaza merged with Cameo-Pathé and the Scranton Button Company to form the (ARC). ARC dropped Pathé and Scranton Button's label Emerson but kept active all of the other labels belonging to the combined company, including Banner. After ARC acquired the rights to Brunswick Records, Banner's product lines began to reflect the general ARC product, and this added more African-American and country music to its catalogue. As part of the ARC-BRC combination, it no longer enjoyed a flagship status accorded to Melotone among the budget labels. Although ARC-BRC dropped some of the dime-store labels, it kept Banner until December 1938, when the CBS Broadcasting Network bought ARC-BRC and liquidated all of the dime-store labels.

In December 1946, entrepreneur Sam Selsman formed a new Banner Records label, devoted to Jewish music and Yiddish-language comedy routines; although this later Banner Records no longer actively records, its catalogue continues. There is no relationship between the Hebrew Banner label and the earlier products of Plaza Music or ARC/BRC; nor is there is a relationship to a dime-store label put out by Leeds and Caitlin in the early 1900s, though the label's design is similar.

== Label series ==
Banner debuted with two concurrent label series in January 1922: a popular 1000 series side by side with a "Standard" 2000 series of semi-classical music, comedy, and some Jewish material. Reaching Banner 1999 in the main series in mid-1927, Banner skipped ahead to 6000 and terminated the Standard series at the end of the year at Banner 2183. At this point, Banner also stopped the 6000 series at Banner 6167 and moved again to a 7000 series starting at Banner 7001. This ended in early 1929 at Banner 7265 and then reverted to the old series, starting at Banner 6200. The series survived the merger into ARC, but was ended at the start of 1930 at Banner 6566 and restarted at 0500 until it reached 0872 later in the year. The number series was then started again at 32001 and the price changed from 25 cents to 35 cents in order to bring Banner in line with other dime-store labels being sold 3 for a dollar. This lasted until 1935, when the dime-store labels were all married to a central numbering system. But releases were not necessarily unified; for example, Robert Johnson, who did have some releases on Melotone, did not appear on Banner.

== Legacy ==
Banner discs are found throughout the United States, indicating their popularity as Plaza's flagship label. The audio fidelity of the records was average to slightly below average for the time, but as Banner was a cheap label they were pressed from cheaper materials that did not withstand repeated playing with the heavy phonograph players of the time. Most Banner discs found today exhibit considerable wear and surface noise, but they are still valued by virtue of the selections.

In keeping with their low-price production, it is common for a current hit song on the A-side and a lesser-known song as the B side. Many of these B side songs are eccentric tunes not recorded elsewhere (but, of course, found on the other Plaza/ARC labels). Also scattered around these B sides are tunes by Luis Russell, Duke Ellington, small groups from the Ben Pollack orchestra, among others.

== Roster: Plaza period ==
- Harold Arlen
- Sam Ash
- Franklyn Baur
- Al Bernard
- May Singhi Breen
- California Ramblers
- Joe Candullo
- Myron Cohen
- Vernon Dalhart
- Vaughn DeLeath
- Cliff Edwards
- Leo Erdody
- Frank Ferera
- Arthur Fields
- The Four Aristocrats
- Miss Frankie
- Bob Fuller
- Rev. J. M. Gates
- Nathan Glantz
- Porter Grainger
- Lou Gold
- Billy Golden via Emerson Records
- Wendell Hall
- W.C. Handy
- Charles W. Harrison
- Charles Hart
- Lucille Hegamin
- Fletcher Henderson
- Rosa Henderson
- Billy Jones & Ernie Hare
- Joe Jordan
- Irving Kaufman
- Jack Kaufman
- Louis Katzman
- Hal Kemp
- Sam Lanin
- Scrappy Lambert
- Julius Lenzberg
- Jules Levy, Jr.
- Vincent Lopez
- Frank Luther
- Hazel Meyers
- Josie Miles
- Lizzie Miles
- Frank Munn
- Billy Murray
- Original Indiana Five
- Original Memphis Five
- Eddie Peabody
- Jack Pettis
- Evelyn Preer
- The Radio Franks
- Harry Richman
- Carson Robison
- Walter B. Rogers
- Peter DeRose
- Domenico Savino
- Adrian Schubert
- Ben Selvin
- Boyd Senter
- Elliott Shaw
- Monroe Silver
- Paul Specht
- Elizabeth Spencer
- Aileen Stanley
- Cal Stewart via Emerson Records
- Ernest Stoneman
- Toots Paka Hawaiian Troupe
- Fred Van Eps
- Sam Ku West
- Harry Yerkes

== Roster: ARC period ==
Although some of the artists from the previous incarnation of Banner survived into this second period, particularly in 1929-1931, none of these artists appeared on the first label.

- Henry "Red" Allen
- Clarence Ashley
- Gene Austin
- Gene Autry
- Baby Rose Marie
- Smith Ballew
- Charlie Barnet
- Lucille Bogan
- Big Bill Broonzy
- Smiley Burnette
- Chick Bullock
- Henry Busse
- Blanche Calloway
- Cab Calloway
- The Canova Family
- Eddie Cantor
- Bill Carlisle
- Cliff Carlisle
- Carter Family
- Sam Collins
- Bill Cox
- Bing Crosby
- Charlie Davis
- Walter Davis
- Eddie Dean
- Georgia Tom Dorsey
- Morton Downey, Sr.
- Duke Ellington
- Ruth Etting
- Alice Faye
- Red Foley
- George Hamilton Green
- Joe Green
- Mal Hallett
- Mike Hanapi
- Annette Hanshaw
- Joe Haymes
- Hokum Boys
- Hoosier Hot Shots
- Frankie "Half Pint" Jaxon
- Gene Kardos
- Ed Kirkeby
- Lead Belly
- Guy Lombardo
- Nick Lucas
- Charles Magnante
- Wingy Manone
- Frankie Marvin
- Johnny Marvin
- Memphis Minnie
- Mills Blue Rhythm Band
- Mills Brothers
- Mitchell Christian Singers
- Russ Morgan
- Buddy Moss
- Will Osborne
- Ben Pollack
- Dick Powell
- Prairie Ramblers
- Yank Rachell
- Joe Reichman
- Harry Reser
- Fred Rich
- Tex Ritter
- Fiddlin' Doc Roberts
- Dick Robertson
- Adrian Rollini
- Luis Russell
- Andy Sanella
- Singin' Sam
- Roy Smeck
- Phil Spitalny
- Eva Taylor
- Varsity Eight
- Joe Venuti
- Don Voorhees
- Jay Wilbur
- Josh White
- Clarence Williams
- Victor Young

== See also ==
- List of record labels
- ARC (record company)
