= Regal Records (1921) =

American record label

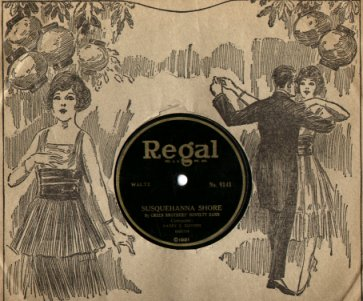
- The First U.S. Regal Record
- Parent company: Emerson Phonograph Company Inc.
- Founded: 1921; 105 years ago
- Founder: Emerson Phonograph Company Inc.
- Defunct: 1931; 95 years ago
- Status: Defunct
- Distributor: Emerson Phonograph Company Inc.
- Genre: Jazz
- Country of origin: United States
- Location: New York City

Regal Records was an American record label owned by the Plaza Music Company that issued recordings from 1921 through 1931. Masters were recorded by Emerson Records, and issued mostly in chain stores for 50 cents each. Noted artists with records issued on Regal include Fletcher Henderson's Orchestra, Eubie Blake, Miss Frankie, the Original Memphis Five, Cab Calloway, and Duke Ellington. The label was acquired in August 1922 by Scranton Button Company.

== See also ==
- List of record labels
- Regal Records (disambiguation)
