= Romeo Records =

American record label (1926–1938)

- Trade name: Romeo
- Company type: Private
- Industry: record label (1926-1938); Entertainment (1926-present)
- Genre: Jazz
- Founded: 1926; United States
- Defunct: April 1938
- Fate: Active as an Entertainment Company
- Headquarters: United States
- Number of locations: United States; International
- Area served: Worldwide
- Parent: Independent (1926-1931); American Record Corporation (1931-1938); S. H. Kress & Co. (1938-1981); Kmart City Products (1981-present)
- Website: Romeo Records on the Internet Archive's Great 78 Project

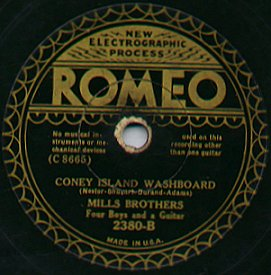
Label of a Romeo Record by the Mills Brothers

Romeo Records was an American jazz record label that started in 1926 as a subsidiary of Cameo Records. The discs were sold exclusively at S. H. Kress & Co. department stores and retailed for 25 cents each.

In 1931 Romeo was acquired by the American Record Corporation and continued through 1938 until the cessation of ARC's dime-store labels: (Perfect, Melotone, Banner, and Oriole).

From the beginning, Romeo discs had a maroon label. It was changed to a black label in 1931 and then became blue in 1935.

== See also ==
- List of record labels
