= Oriole Records (U.S.) =

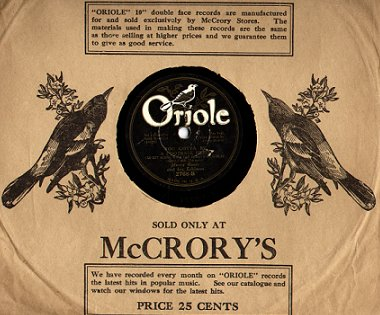
- Oriole disc sleeve
- Founded: 1921
- Founder: McCrory's
- Defunct: 1937
- Status: Defunct
- Country of origin: U.S

Oriole Records was an American record label founded in 1921 by McCrory's stores.

The Oriole label first appeared in 1921, selling for 25 cents per disc record. Originally, Oriole records were pressed by the Cameo Record Company (generally not from Cameo material, however), but this arrangement lasted briefly. Most of the masters were leased from other labels, early on mostly Emerson. From around number 115, Orioles were pressed by Grey Gull and usually have unusual pairings of material, with one side being a hit popular tune and the other "standard" material, sometimes classical music. At number 250, Orioles began being pressed by the Plaza Music Company, which also pressed Banner Records, and whose issues were the original labels to be treated as "cheap" labels. Oriole and Banner, in common with Jewel Records, the Sears & Roebuck label Challenge Records, and a few others, often used a standard set of "noms du disque" on their labels, rather than the actual names of the artists who recorded the tracks they issued. Plaza-pressed Orioles used "control numbers" to disguise their matrix numbers; oddly enough, these were later to appear on the flagship Banner label. After Plaza was merged into the American Record Corporation, ARC matrix numbers replaced the control numbers.

During the 1930–32 period, ARC dropped a number of their labels; however, Oriole continued (due to the successful McCrory's contract), using the same number series (which eventually reached past 2000) as well as another series for country and race records. In August, 1935, all the low-priced labels owned by ARC began using a new, date-related numbering system, in which the last digit (originally the last two digits) of the year was followed by the number for the month and finally a two-digit serial number specific to that month's releases. Race and country music records started their serial numbering at 51, so a blues record released in February, 1936 would carry a number like 6-02-51.

As the Depression and the popularity of radio cut into record sales, most of the store labels were discontinued; another factor was that the younger record buyers looked for specific versions of their favorite tunes, so name artists like Glenn Miller and Benny Goodman made up the majority of discs sold. The last Oriole records seem to have been issued in January, 1937. All of the low-priced labels were dropped in April, 1938 and the American Record Corporation was acquired by the Columbia Broadcasting System later that year.

== See also ==
- Conqueror Records: Sears store brand record label
- Embassy Records: UK Woolworth's store brand record label
- List of record labels
