= Pathé Records =

French record label

- U.S. Pathé disc label
- Parent company: Pathé
- Founded: 1894; 132 years ago
- Founder: Charles Pathé; Émile Pathé
- Defunct: 1930; 96 years ago
- Status: Defunct
- Genre: Various
- Country of origin: France
- Location: Paris

Pathé Records was an international record company and label and producer of phonographs, based in France, and active from the 1890s through the 1930s.

== Early years ==
The Pathé record business was founded by brothers Charles and Émile Pathé, then owners of a successful bistro in Paris. In 1894, they began selling Edison and Columbia phonographs and accompanying cylinder records. Shortly thereafter, the brothers designed and sold their own phonographs. These incorporated elements of other brands. Soon after, they also started marketing pre-recorded cylinder records. By 1896 the Pathé brothers had offices and recording studios not only in Paris, but also in London, Milan, and St. Petersburg.

== Pathé cylinders and discs ==
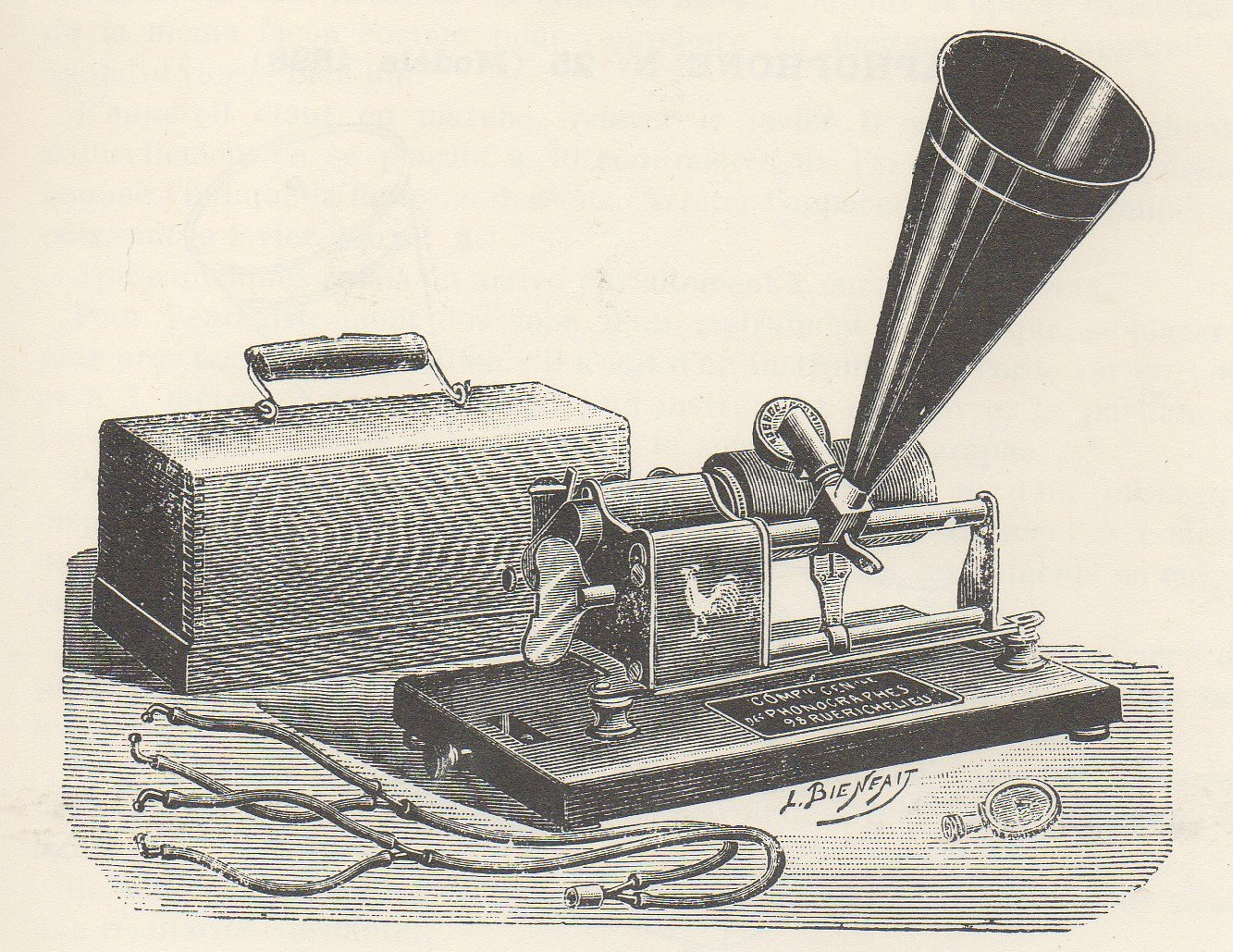
An early Pathé cylinder phonograph from 1898. The design closely mimics that of the Columbia "Eagle".

In 1894, the Pathé brothers started selling their own phonographs. The earliest Pathé offerings were phonograph cylinders. Pathé manufactured cylinder records until approximately 1914. In addition to standard size cylinder records (2 1/4-inch-diameter (57 mm)), Pathé produced several larger styles. The "Salon" records measured 3 1/2 inches (8.9 cm) in diameter and the larger "Stentor" records measured 5 inches (13 cm) in diameter. The "Le Céleste" records, the largest commercial cylinder records manufactured by any phonograph company, measured 5 inches (13 cm) in diameter by 9 inches (23 cm) long.

In 1905 the Pathé brothers entered the growing field of disc records. They needed to employ several unusual technologies as preventive measures against patent infringement. At first they sold single-sided discs with a recording in wax on top of a cement base. In October 1906 they started producing discs in the more usual manner with shellac. Even with this less eccentric material, the early Pathé discs were unlike any others. The sound was recorded vertically in the groove, rather than side-to-side, and the groove was wider than in other companies' records, requiring a special ball-shaped .005-inch-radius (0.13 mm) stylus for playing. The discs rotated at 90 rpm, rather than the usual 75 to 80 rpm. Originally, the groove started on the inside, near the center of the disc, and spiraled out to the edge. In 1916, Pathé changed over to the customary rim-start format, a more nearly normal 80 rpm speed, and paper labels instead of the stamped-in, paint-filled text previously used. Pathé discs were commonly produced in 10 inches (25 cm), 10 1/2 inches (27 cm), and 11 1/2 inches (29 cm) sizes. 6 1/2 inches (17 cm), 8 inches (20 cm), and 14 inches (36 cm) discs were also made, as were very large 20 inches (51 cm) discs that played at 120 rpm. Due to their fragility, unwieldiness, and much higher price, the largest sizes were a commercial failure and were not produced for long.

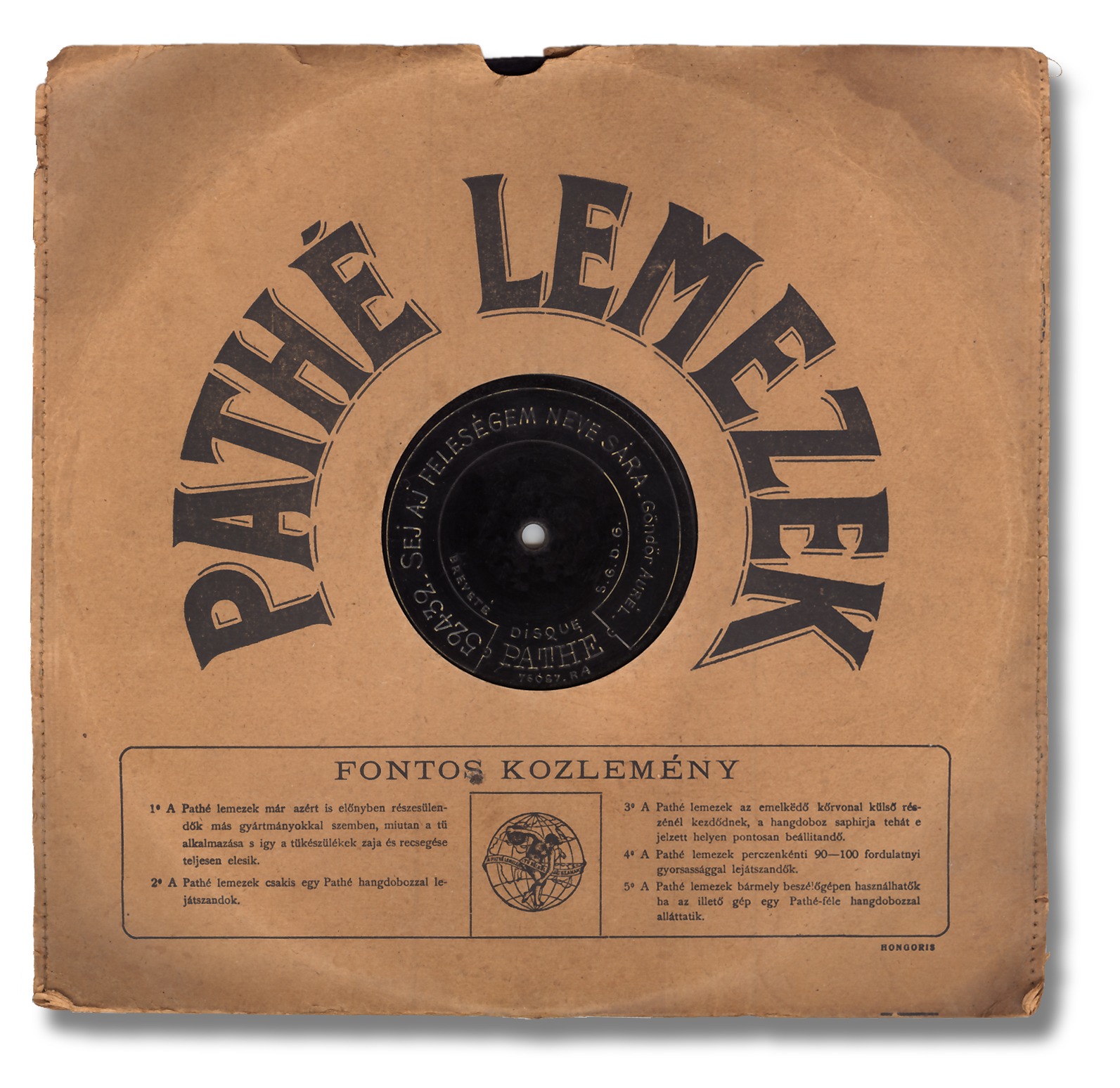
Hungarian Pathé record

In France, Pathé became the largest and most successful distributor of cylinder records and phonographs. These, however, failed to make significant headway in foreign markets such as the United Kingdom and the United States where other brands were already in widespread use. Although Pathé cylinder records were never popular outside France, their disc records had a quantifiable influence in Spanish musical realm, and sold successfully in many foreign countries such as the United States, United Kingdom, Germany, Italy, and Russia.

Pathé was the first company to make master recordings in a different medium than the final commercial product. In the Pathé recording studios, masters were cut on what was called a "Master Cylinder", rapidly spinning wax cylinders that measured about 13 inches (33 cm) long and 4 1/2 inches (11 cm) in diameter. Beginning in 1913, special "Paradis" cylinders about 8 inches (20 cm) in diameter and 8 1/2 inches (22 cm) long were used. The large, fast-spinning cylinders allowed for a greater level of audio fidelity. The various types of commercial Pathé cylinders and discs were then dubbed (or "pantographed") from these masters. This dubbing process enabled copies of the same master recording to be made available on multiple formats. The process sometimes resulted in uneven results on the final commercial record, causing a pronounced rumble or other audio artifacts (This rumble was generally undetectable on acoustic wind-up phonographs of the period, but is noticeable on electric and more modern equipment.), and has transformed the company's early discography into one of the most daunting to rebuild.

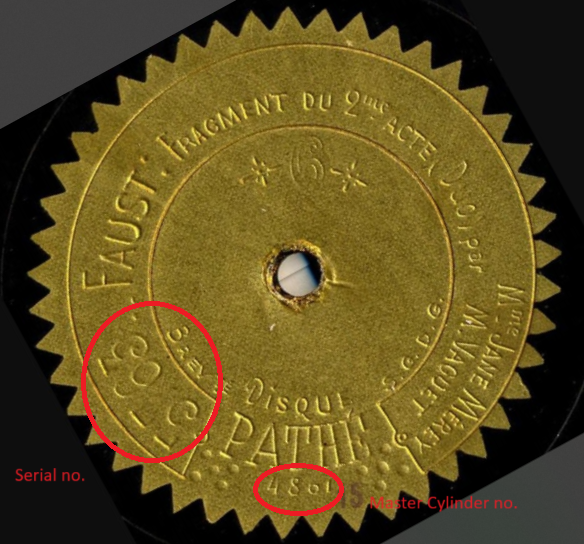
Early Pathé "Ciment" record label from Christmas 1905

More specifically, the most important part of the Pathé system was the way master cylinders and their finished product were catalogued; in a way very similar to Berliner Gramophone's, Pathé used a block system to store the information of Master Cylinders and a serial system for the actual commercial pressings. That is, the same ""matrix"" number was first allocated to early 1890s cylinders (with a specific selection), then to a proper Master Cylinder that re-recorded the same selection, and then for the later selections that were recorded on the same Master Cylinder after its musical content became obsolete or damaged and had to be reshaved (which weren't necessarily the same musical selection). As for the stampers, each stamper of both cylinders and disc (independently from the size) has the same serial number (different between both formats), and is more or less sequential, so that media from 1916 and before (before paper labels were introduced) can be more or less easily traced back after obtaining a great enough information about each "snapshot" of the Master Cylinder.

After 1927, the company started taking a more modern approach and commenced using the simple system of master and stamper discs that the rest of corporations were using. Finally, after 1929, the company dismantled their entire Master Cylinder archive and written proof of every selection recorded to finance the company after the crisis.

The vertically cut Pathé discs normally required a special Pathé phonograph equipped with a sapphire ball stylus. The advantage of the sapphire ball stylus was its permanence. There was no need to change a needle after every record side. Since most records and phonographs used a different playback method, various attachments were marketed that allowed one to equip a Pathé phonograph to play standard, laterally-cut records. Attachments were also sold to equip a standard phonograph to play Pathé records.

In 1920, Pathé introduced a line of "needle-cut" records, at first only for the US market. The needle-cut records were laterally-cut discs designed to be compatible with standard phonographs, and they were labelled Pathé Actuelle. In the following year, these "needle-cut" records were introduced in the United Kingdom and within a few more years they were selling more than the vertical Pathés, even on the continent. Attempts to market the Pathé vertical-cut discs abroad were abandoned in 1925, though they continued to sell in France until 1932.

In mid-1922, Pathé introduced a lower priced label called Perfect. This label became one of the most popular and successful "dime store" labels of the 1920s, and survived beyond the end of the US Pathé label – discontinued in 1930 – right up to 1938.

In January 1927, Pathé began recording using the new electronic microphone technology, as opposed to the strictly acoustical-mechanical method of recording they used until then.

In December 1928, the French and British Pathé phonograph assets were sold to the British Columbia Graphophone Company. In July 1929, the assets of the American Pathé record company were merged into the newly formed American Record Corporation. However, the Pathé and Pathé-Marconi records imprints continued in Italy. In 1931 the label continued as VCM group ('Voce de Maestro [His Master's Voice] - Columbia - Marconiphone').

The Pathé and Pathé-Marconi labels and catalogue still survive, first as imprints of EMI and now currently EMI's successor Parlophone Records. In 1967 EMI Italiana took control of the entire Italian Pathé catalog. In turn, the Universal Music Group acquired EMI Italiana in 2013. The film division of Pathé Frères still survives in France.

== See also ==
- List of record labels
- Pathé News
- Pathé Pictures
- Pathé Records (Shanghai & Hong Kong)
