= Perfect Records =

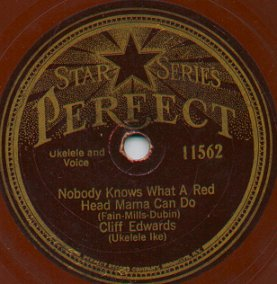
- Disc featuring Cliff "Ukulele Ike" Edwards
- Parent company: Pathé Records
- Founded: 1922 (original); 1993 (relaunch)
- Defunct: 1938 (original)
- Status: active
- Genre: Jazz, pop, blues, country
- Country of origin: U.S.

Perfect Records was a United States–based record label, founded in 1922 by Pathé Records to produce cheap 78 rpm discs.

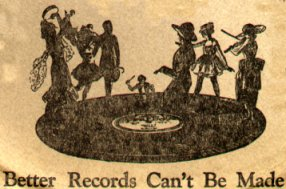
Perfect's logo and slogan from record sleeve

From the start, Perfect Records sold well. The Pathé and Perfect labels were part of the merger that created the American Record Corporation (ARC) in July 1929. After the merger, ARC weeded out some of their poorer-selling labels (Pathé, for example), and Perfect continued to be a successful label through the 1930s until ARC dropped their entire group of cheaper labels in late 1938.

The label was revived in 1993 by Dean Blackwood and issued recordings pressed on 78 r.p.m. vinyl by Sun City Girls, Charlie Feathers, Junior Kimbrough, The Balfa Brothers, and John Fahey.

== See also ==
- List of record labels
