= Overpeck =

Overpeck may refer to:

People:

- Lem Overpeck (1911–2003), the 29th Lieutenant Governor of South Dakota from 1965 to 1969

Settlements:

- Overpeck Township, New Jersey, former township in Bergen County, New Jersey, United States, from 1897 to 1938
- Overpeck, Ohio, unincorporated community in central St. Clair Township, Butler County, Ohio, United States

Geography:

- Overpeck Creek, tributary of the Hackensack River in Bergen County in northeastern New Jersey in the United States
- Overpeck County Park, 811 acre (3.28 km^{2}) county park in Bergen County, New Jersey, United States
