= Hackensack Bridge =

Hackensack Bridge may refer to:

- Pulaski Skyway, contains the Hackensack River Bridge
- Lincoln Highway Hackensack River Bridge or otherwise known as the Shawn Carson and Robert Nguyen Memorial Bridge
- Winant Avenue Bridge
- Wittpenn Bridge
