= Johnny Messner =

Johnny Messner may refer to:

- Johnny Messner (musician) (1909–1986), American big band/swing bandleader
- Johnny Messner (actor) (born 1970), American actor
