= Jim Keogh (technology writer) =

American technology writer

Jim Keogh is an American technology writer. He is the author of more than 84 books, including five ...For Dummies books. Keogh introduced PC programming across the US in his Popular Electronics magazine column in 1982, four years after Apple Computer started in a garage. He developed the Electronic Commerce Track at Columbia University and was a team member who built one of the first Windows applications by a Wall Street firm that was featured by Bill Gates in 1986 on Windows on Wall Street. Keogh wrote one of the first books that showed how to solve the Year 2000 problem. He is the former educational columnist for The Record, New Jersey's second-largest daily newspaper. He has appeared on CNN, Fox, Good Day New York, NBC Weekend Today in New York, and ABC World Wide Business Report. Keogh is on the faculty of New York University.

A resident of Ridgefield Park, New Jersey, he served as a trustee on the board of education of the Ridgefield Park Public Schools.

== Work ==
=== Computer books ===
- XML Demystified,
- XML: Your Visual Blueprint For Writing Dynamic Applications,
- Data Structures Demystified,
- OOP Demystified,
- SAP R/3 Handbook 3/E,
- Palm OS Cobalt Programming From The Ground Up,
- Unofficial Guide To Microsoft Office Access 2007,
- Visual Basic, 2005: Your Visual Blueprint For Writing Dynamic Applications,
- ASP.Net 2.0 Demystified,
- Windows Programming Programmer's Notebook,
- COBOL Programmer's Notebook,
- Webmaster's Guide To VB Script,
- Java Demystified,
- Java 2 Database Programming For Dummies,
- J2ME, The Complete Reference,
- J2EE, The Complete Reference,
- JavaScript Demystified,
- C, An Introduction To Programming,
- C++, An Introduction To Programming,
- C++ Programmer's Notebook : An Illustrated Quick Reference,
- The C/C++ Programmer's Notebook,
- UNIX Programming For Dummies,
- Linux Programming For Dummies,
- Essential Guide To Computer Hardware,
- Essential Guide To Networking,
- MCSE Networking Essentials Interactive Training Course,
- The Complete MCSE Networking Essentials Training Course,
- Core MCSE Networking Essentials

=== Nursing books ===
- Nursing Informatics Demystified,
- Psychiatric And Mental Health Nursing Demystified,
- Schaum's Outline Of Critical Care Nursing,
- Schaum's Outline Of Emergency Nursing,
- Schaum's Outline Of Medical Charting,
- Schaum's Outline Of ECG Interpretations,
- Schaum's Outline Of Medical Surgical Nursing,
- Schaum's Outline Of Medical Terminology,
- Schaum's Outline Of Nursing Laboratory and Diagnostic Tests,
- Schaum's Outlines Pharmacology,
- Pediatric Nursing Demystified,
- Nursing Laboratory And Diagnostic Tests Demystified,
- Dosage Calculations Demystified,
- Medical-Surgical Nursing Demystified,
- Medical Charting Demystified,
- Medical Billing And Coding Demystified,
- Pharmacology Demystified,
- Nurse Management Demystified,
- Microbiology Demystified

=== Education books ===
- Secrets To Good Grades,
- Getting The Best Education For Your Child A Parent's Checklist

=== Business books ===
- E-Mergers: Merging, Acquiring, And Partnering E-Commerce Businesses,
- Project Planning And Implementation,
- A Solution to the Year 2000 Problem

=== Other books ===
- Fantasy Sports Online For Dummies
