= Daniel Ruch =

American soccer player and coach

Personal information
- Full name: Daniel Ruch
- Date of birth: January 1, 1983 (age 43)
- Place of birth: Ridgefield Park, New Jersey, United States
- Height: 6 ft 0 in (1.83 m)
- Position: Goalkeeper

Youth career
- 2002–2004: Lynchburg College
- 2005: Old Dominion University

Senior career*
| Years | Team | Apps | (Gls) |
| 2006 | Virginia Beach Mariners | 0 | (0) |
| 2007 | Wilmington Hammerheads | 10 | (0) |

Managerial career
- 2007–: Virginia Wesleyan (assistant)
- * Club domestic league appearances and goals

Daniel Ruch (born January 1, 1983, in Ridgefield Park, New Jersey) is an assistant soccer coach with Virginia Wesleyan. He played professionally for two years for the Virginia Beach Mariners of the USL Second Division and the Wilmington Hammerheads FC.

Ruch attended Ridgefield Park High School. He then began his college soccer career at Lynchburg College before finishing it at Old Dominion University. In 2006, he signed with the Virginia Beach Mariners of the USL Second Division before moving to the Wilmington Hammerheads FC of USL-2 in 2007. He retired from playing professionally after the 2007 season and was hired that fall by Virginia Wesleyan as a goalkeeper coach.
