= Little Ferry Public Schools =

School district in Bergen County, New Jersey, US

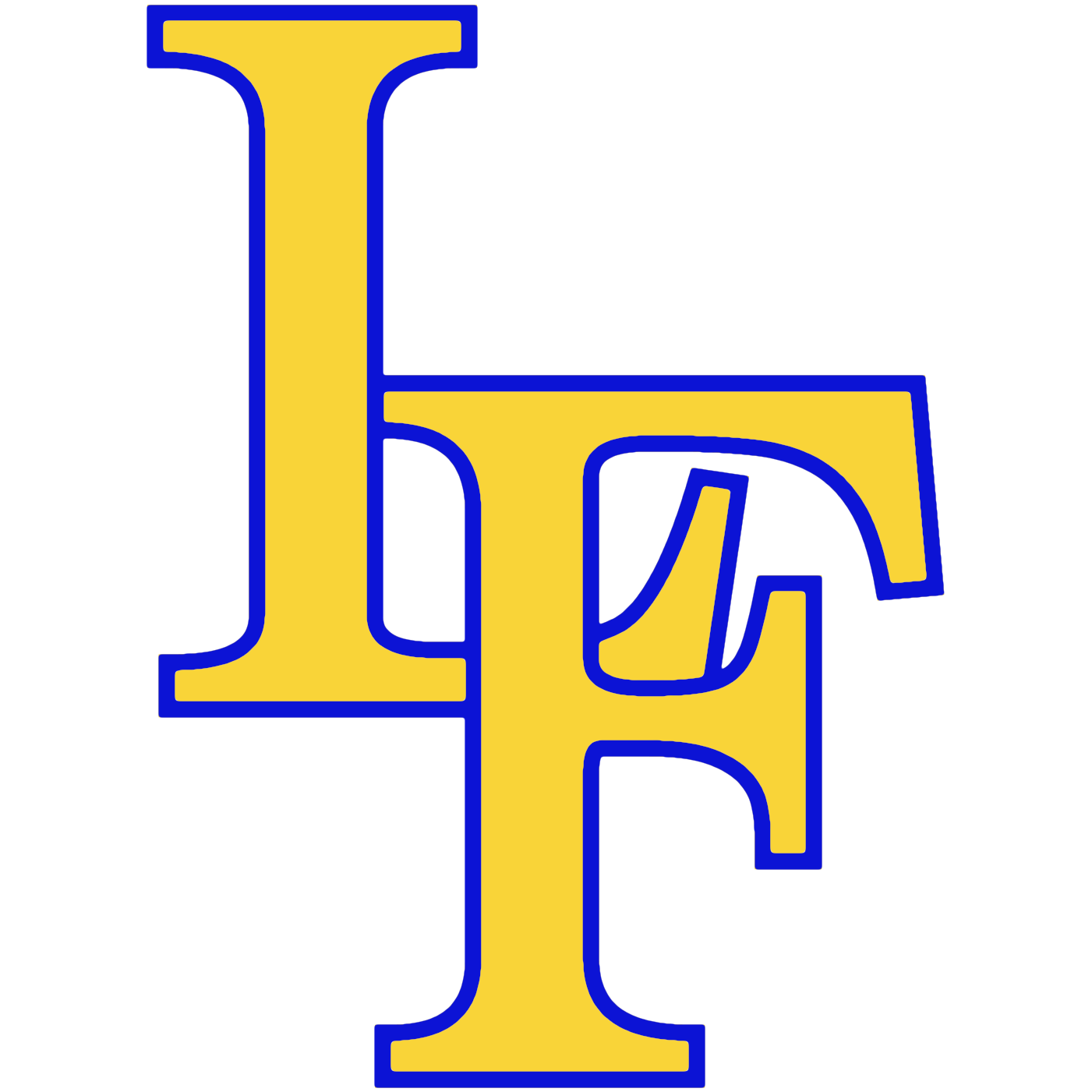

Address
- 130 Liberty Street Little Ferry, Bergen County, New Jersey, 07643; United States
- Coordinates: 40.847497°N 74.042943°W

District information
- Grades: PreK to 8
- Superintendent: Matthew A. Perrapato
- Business administrator: John Gomez
- Schools: 2

Students and staff
- Enrollment: 806 (as of 2022–23)
- Faculty: 84.0 FTEs
- Student–teacher ratio: 9.6:1

Other information
- District Factor Group: CD
- Website: www.littleferry.k12.nj.us
Ind.	Per pupil	District spending	Rank (*)	K-8 average	%± vs. average
1A	Total Spending	$14,916	11	$18,891	−21.0%
1	Budgetary Cost	10,718	5	14,159	−24.3%
2	Classroom Instruction	7,182	9	8,659	−17.1%
6	Support Services	1,268	3	2,167	−41.5%
8	Administrative Cost	918	1	1,547	−40.7%
10	Operations & Maintenance	1,160	10	1,612	−28.0%
13	Extracurricular Activities	59	15	104	−43.3%
16	Median Teacher Salary	64,922	65	61,136
Data from NJDoE 2014 Taxpayers' Guide to Education Spending. *Of K-8 districts with more than 750 students. Lowest spending=1; Highest=84

The Little Ferry Public Schools is a community public school district that serves students in pre-kindergarten through eighth grade from Little Ferry in Bergen County, in the U.S. state of New Jersey.

As of the 2022–23 school year, the district, comprised of two schools, had an enrollment of 806 students and 84.0 classroom teachers (on an FTE basis), for a student–teacher ratio of 9.6:1.

The district is classified by the New Jersey Department of Education as being in District Factor Group "CD", the sixth-highest of eight groupings. District Factor Groups organize districts statewide to allow comparison by common socioeconomic characteristics of the local districts. From lowest socioeconomic status to highest, the categories are A, B, CD, DE, FG, GH, I and J.

As Little Ferry does not have its own high school, public school students from the borough attend Ridgefield Park High School in Ridgefield Park for ninth through twelfth grades as part of a sending/receiving relationship with the Ridgefield Park Public Schools that has been in place since 1953. As of the 2022–23 school year, the school had an enrollment of 1,174 students and 87.8 classroom teachers (on an FTE basis), for a student–teacher ratio of 13.4:1.

== History ==
Prior to the 1953-54 school year, students from Little Ferry had attended Lodi High School, as part of a sendin/receiving relationship with the Lodi Public Schools.

== Awards and recognition ==
Memorial School was recognized by Governor Jim McGreevey in 2003 as one of 25 schools selected statewide for the First Annual Governor's School of Excellence award.

== Schools ==
The district operates two school facilities, across the street from each other. Schools in the district (with 2022–23 enrollment data from the National Center for Education Statistics) are:

- Washington Elementary School with 445 students in grades PreK-4
  - Tonilyn Peragallo, principal
- Memorial Middle School with 342 students in grades 5-8
  - George Peakler, principal

== Administration ==
Core members of the district's administration are:

- Matthew A. Perrapato, superintendent of schools
- John Gomez, board secretary and business administrator

== Board of education ==
The district's board of education, comprised of nine members, sets policy and oversees the fiscal and educational operation of the district through its administration. As a Type II school district, the board's trustees are elected directly by voters to serve three-year terms of office on a staggered basis, with three seats up for election each year held (since 2012) as part of the November general election. The board appoints a superintendent to oversee the district's day-to-day operations and a business administrator to supervise the business functions of the district.
