= Yoojin Grace Wuertz =

American novelist (born 1980)

Yoojin Grace Wuertz (born 1980) is an American novelist who was reviewed for her 2017 book Everything Belongs To Us.

Born in Seoul, South Korea, Wuertz moved to the United States with her family at the age of six and was raised in the North Jersey communities of Paramus and Ridgefield Park. Wuertz earned a bachelor's degree in English from Yale University and earned a master's degree in fiction writing from New York University. Originally planning to pursue a career as an academic, she left a Ph.D. program at University of California, Berkeley and decided to devote her time to writing.

Wuertz has been a resident of Oradell.
