= Little Ferry, New Jersey =

Borough in Bergen County, New Jersey, US

- Borough
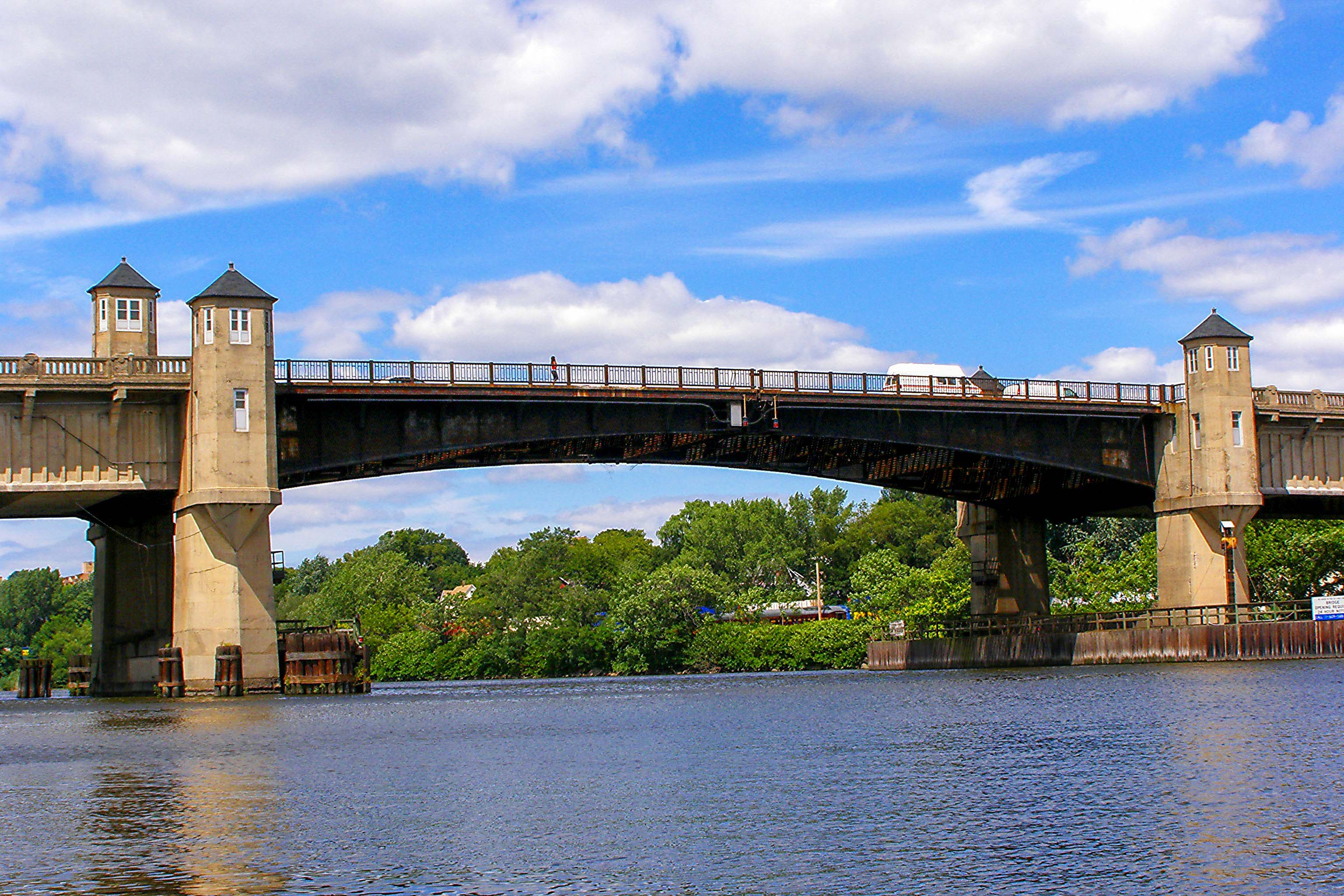
- Winant Avenue Bridge

- Seal

- Location of Little Ferry in Bergen County highlighted in red (left). Inset map: Location of Bergen County in New Jersey highlighted in orange (right).

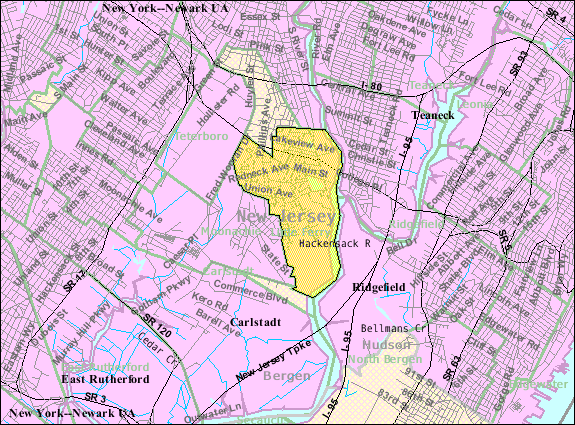
- Census Bureau map of Little Ferry, New Jersey

- Location in Bergen County Location in New Jersey Location in the United States
- Coordinates: 40.843431°N 74.034239°W
- Country: United States
- State: New Jersey
- County: Bergen
- Incorporated: September 18, 1894

Government
  - Type: Borough
  - Body: Borough Council
  - Mayor: Mauro D. Raguseo (D, term ends December 31, 2023)
  - Administrator: Lisette M. Duffy
  - Municipal clerk: Barbara Maldonado

Area
  - Total: 1.67 sq mi (4.32 km^{2})
  - Land: 1.48 sq mi (3.83 km^{2})
  - Water: 0.19 sq mi (0.50 km^{2}) 11.44%
  - Rank: 433rd of 565 in state 55th of 70 in county
- Elevation: 3 ft (0.91 m)

Population (2020)
  - Total: 10,987
  - Estimate (2023): 10,914
  - Rank: 228th of 565 in state 35th of 70 in county
  - Density: 7,438.7/sq mi (2,872.1/km^{2})
  - Rank: 61st of 565 in state 18th of 70 in county
- Time zone: UTC−05:00 (Eastern (EST))
  - Summer (DST): UTC−04:00 (Eastern (EDT))
- ZIP Code: 07643
- Area code: 201
- FIPS code: 3400340680
- GNIS feature ID: 0885281
- Website: www.littleferrynj.org

Little Ferry is a borough in Bergen County, in the U.S. state of New Jersey. As of the 2020 United States census, the borough's population was 10,987, an increase of 361 (+3.4%) from the 2010 census count of 10,626, which in turn reflected a decline of 174 (−1.6%) from the 10,800 counted in the 2000 census.

== History ==
Little Ferry was formed by an act of the New Jersey Legislature on September 18, 1894, from portions of Lodi Township and New Barbadoes Township, based on the results of a referendum held two days earlier. The borough was formed during the "Boroughitis" phenomenon then sweeping through Bergen County, in which 26 boroughs were formed in the county in 1894 alone.

During the colonial era, the borough was the site of an important ferry crossing between the region's towns at Bergen and Hackensack, which was operated by rope on the site starting in 1659, continuing until 1826 when it was replaced by a bridge on the Bergen Turnpike.

Gethsemane Cemetery, an African burial ground, was opened in 1860 and was used for interments until 1924. The site was added to the National Register of Historic Places in 1994.

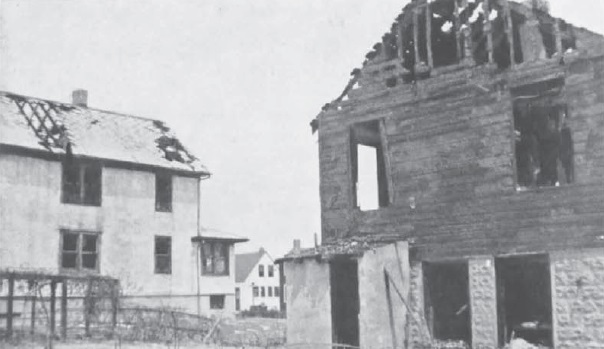
361 Main Street following the Fox vault fire

In the earlier 20th nearby Fort Lee on the Hudson Palisades was home to many film studios of America's first motion picture industry. On July 9, 1937, a major fire broke out in a 20th Century-Fox film storage facility in Little Ferry. Flammable nitrate film had previously contributed to several fires in film industry laboratories, studios and vaults, although the precise causes were often unknown; in the Little Ferry fire, temperatures of 100 °F (38 °C) and insufficient venting were the proximate causes.

Rosie's Diner (formerly the Farmland Diner) was used in the 1970s for the filming of Bounty paper towel commercials featuring Nancy Walker as Rosie the Waitress.

New Jersey Monthly magazine ranked Little Ferry 35th in its 2008 rankings of the "Best Places To Live" in New Jersey.

== Geography ==
According to the United States Census Bureau, the borough had a total area of 1.67 square miles (4.32 km^{2}), including 1.48 square miles (3.83 km^{2}) of land and 0.19 square miles (0.50 km^{2}) of water (11.44%).

The borough borders the Bergen County municipalities of Hackensack, Moonachie, Ridgefield, Ridgefield Park, South Hackensack and Teterboro.

The borough lies near the confluence of the Hackensack River and Overpeck Creek in the New Jersey Meadowlands.

== Demographics ==
Historical population
Census	Pop.	Note	%±
1880	58		—
1890	781		1,246.6%
1900	1,240		58.8%
1910	2,541		104.9%
1920	2,715		6.8%
1930	4,155		53.0%
1940	4,545		9.4%
1950	4,955		9.0%
1960	6,175		24.6%
1970	9,064		46.8%
1980	9,399		3.7%
1990	9,989		6.3%
2000	10,800		8.1%
2010	10,626		−1.6%
2020	10,987		3.4%
2023 (est.)	10,914	▼	−0.7%
Population sources: 1880–1890; 1890–1920 1890–1910; 1910–1930 1900–2020; 2000 2010 2020

=== Racial and ethnic composition ===
Little Ferry borough, Bergen County, New Jersey – Racial and ethnic composition Note: the US Census treats Hispanic/Latino as an ethnic category. This table excludes Latinos from the racial categories and assigns them to a separate category. Hispanics/Latinos may be of any race.
Race / Ethnicity (NH = Non-Hispanic)	Pop 2000	Pop 2010	Pop 2020	% 2000	% 2010	% 2020
White alone (NH)	6,504	5,016	4,012	60.22%	47.20%	36.52%
Black or African American alone (NH)	487	366	469	4.51%	3.44%	4.27%
Native American or Alaska Native alone (NH)	9	22	6	0.08%	0.21%	0.05%
Asian alone (NH)	1,842	2,550	2,717	17.06%	24.00%	24.73%
Native Hawaiian or Pacific Islander alone (NH)	3	2	3	0.03%	0.02%	0.03%
Other race alone (NH)	26	34	91	0.24%	0.32%	0.83%
Mixed race or Multiracial (NH)	288	194	221	2.67%	1.83%	2.01%
Hispanic or Latino (any race)	1,641	2,442	3,468	15.19%	22.98%	31.56%
Total	10,800	10,626	10,987	100.00%	100.00%	100.00%

=== 2020 census ===
As of the 2020 census, Little Ferry had a population of 10,987. The median age was 41.5 years. 17.6% of residents were under the age of 18 and 15.8% of residents were 65 years of age or older. For every 100 females there were 95.5 males, and for every 100 females age 18 and over there were 94.2 males age 18 and over.

100.0% of residents lived in urban areas, while 0.0% lived in rural areas.

There were 4,351 households in Little Ferry, of which 26.7% had children under the age of 18 living in them. Of all households, 45.4% were married-couple households, 21.0% were households with a male householder and no spouse or partner present, and 28.4% were households with a female householder and no spouse or partner present. About 29.7% of all households were made up of individuals and 9.7% had someone living alone who was 65 years of age or older.

There were 4,527 housing units, of which 3.9% were vacant. The homeowner vacancy rate was 0.7% and the rental vacancy rate was 3.2%.

=== 2010 census ===
The 2010 United States census counted 10,626 people, 4,239 households, and 2,730 families in the borough. The population density was 7,200.1 per square mile (2,780.0/km^{2}). There were 4,439 housing units at an average density of 3,007.8 per square mile (1,161.3/km^{2}). The racial makeup was 60.78% (6,458) White, 3.94% (419) Black or African American, 0.30% (32) Native American, 24.24% (2,576) Asian, 0.04% (4) Pacific Islander, 7.05% (749) from other races, and 3.65% (388) from two or more races. Hispanic or Latino of any race were 22.98% (2,442) of the population. Korean Americans accounted for 12.0% of the population.

Of the 4,239 households, 26.5% had children under the age of 18; 47.9% were married couples living together; 11.4% had a female householder with no husband present and 35.6% were non-families. Of all households, 31.0% were made up of individuals and 9.1% had someone living alone who was 65 years of age or older. The average household size was 2.51 and the average family size was 3.19. Same-sex couples headed 27 households in 2010, an increase from the 24 counted in 2000.

19.7% of the population were under the age of 18, 7.4% from 18 to 24, 30.3% from 25 to 44, 29.4% from 45 to 64, and 13.2% who were 65 years of age or older. The median age was 40.2 years. For every 100 females, the population had 94.6 males. For every 100 females ages 18 and older there were 92.8 males.

The Census Bureau's 2006–2010 American Community Survey showed that (in 2010 inflation-adjusted dollars) median household income was $57,276 (with a margin of error of +/− $6,389) and the median family income was $74,000 (+/− $10,299). Males had a median income of $52,898 (+/− $3,123) versus $40,934 (+/− $3,050) for females. The per capita income for the borough was $29,257 (+/− $2,542). About 4.8% of families and 6.5% of the population were below the poverty line, including 13.1% of those under age 18 and 3.4% of those age 65 or over.

=== 2000 census ===
As of the 2000 United States census there were 10,800 people, 4,366 households, and 2,785 families residing in the borough. The population density was 7,075.2 inhabitants per square mile (2,731.7/km^{2}). There were 4,449 housing units at an average density of 2,914.6 per square mile (1,125.3/km^{2}). The racial makeup of the borough was 68.76% White, 4.71% African American, 0.15% Native American, 17.10% Asian, 0.06% Pacific Islander, 5.75% from other races, and 3.47% from two or more races. Hispanic or Latino of any race were 15.19% of the population.

There were 4,366 households, out of which 27.8% had children under the age of 18 living with them, 49.3% were married couples living together, 10.5% had a female householder with no husband present, and 36.2% were non-families. 31.2% of all households were made up of individuals, and 7.6% had someone living alone who was 65 years of age or older. The average household size was 2.47 and the average family size was 3.16.

In the borough the population was spread out, with 20.2% under the age of 18, 7.4% from 18 to 24, 36.3% from 25 to 44, 23.6% from 45 to 64, and 12.4% who were 65 years of age or older. The median age was 37 years. For every 100 females, there were 95.0 males. For every 100 females age 18 and over, there were 91.7 males.

The median income for a household in the borough was $49,958, and the median income for a family was $59,176. Males had a median income of $42,059 versus $34,286 for females. The per capita income for the borough was $24,210. About 5.9% of families and 6.3% of the population were below the poverty line, including 7.4% of those under age 18 and 6.3% of those age 65 or over.

== Government ==
=== Local government ===
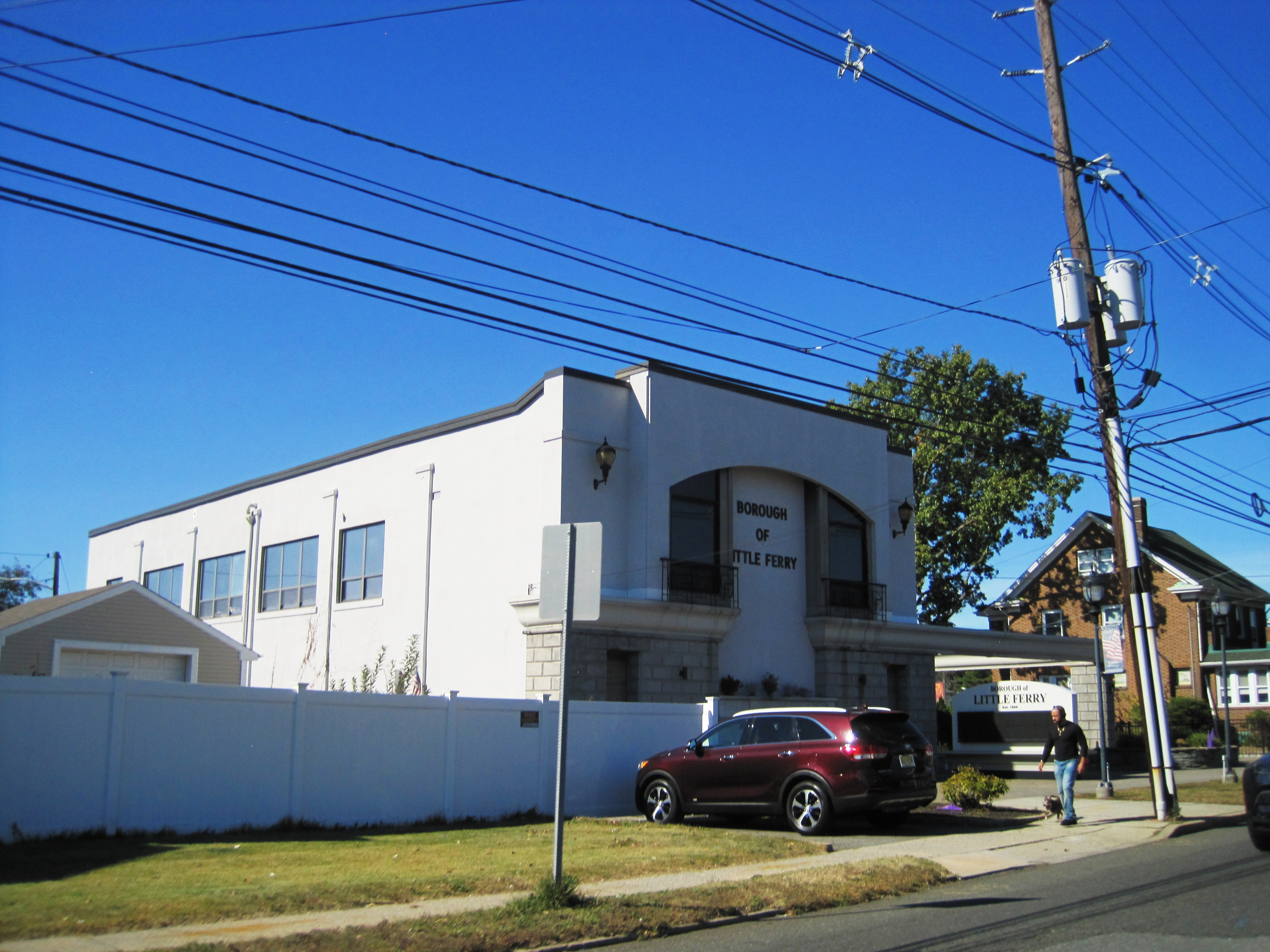
Little Ferry Borough Hall

Little Ferry is governed under the borough form of New Jersey municipal government, one of 218 municipalities (of the 564) statewide that use this form, the most common form of government in New Jersey. The governing body is comprised of the mayor and a borough council, with all positions elected at-large on a partisan basis as part of the November general election. A mayor is elected directly by the voters to a four-year term of office. The borough council includes six members elected to serve three-year terms on a staggered basis, with two seats coming up for election each year in a three-year cycle. The borough form of government used by Little Ferry is a "weak mayor / strong council" government in which council members act as the legislative body with the mayor presiding at meetings and voting only in the event of a tie. The mayor can veto ordinances subject to an override by a two-thirds majority vote of the council. The mayor makes committee and liaison assignments for council members, and most appointments are made by the mayor with the advice and consent of the council.

As of 2024, the mayor of Little Ferry is Democrat Mauro D. Raguseo, serving now in his 5th consecutive (4 year) term of office which ends December 31, 2027. Raguseo previously was elected and served on the borough council from 2000- 2007. He was elected to the council at the age of 22, at the time one of the youngest elected officials in the State of New Jersey. He was elected the youngest Mayor in Borough history November 2007 at the age of 29. In 2024 he became the longest serving mayor in Little Ferry's history elected five times to the office. Members of the borough council are Council President Ronald Anzalone (D, 2024), Jenifer Lange (D, 2023), Stephen Lanum (D, 2025), George J. Muller (D, 2024), Alexander Enrique (D, 2025) and Peggy Steinhilber (D, 2023).

In the 2011 election, Mauro Raguseo was re-elected, defeating Republican Bernard Sobolewski, while council incumbents Roberta Henriquez and Peggy Steinhilber earned new terms in office, fending off Republican challengers Eileen De Leeuw and Stephen Lanum. In the 2010 general election, incumbents Thomas Sarlo and Sue Schuck were re-elected to three-year terms of office, knocking off Republican challengers Foster Lowe and Claudia Zilocchi.

=== Federal, state and county representation ===
Little Ferry is located in the 9th Congressional District and is part of New Jersey's 38th state legislative district.

For the 119th United States Congress, New Jersey's 9th congressional district is represented by Nellie Pou (D, North Haledon) New Jersey is represented in the United States Senate by Democrats Cory Booker (Newark, term ends 2027) and Andy Kim (Moorestown, term ends 2031).

For the 2026–2027 session, the 38th legislative district of the New Jersey Legislature is represented in the State Senate by Joseph Lagana (D, Paramus) and in the General Assembly by Lisa Swain (D, Fair Lawn) and Chris Tully (D, Bergenfield).

Bergen County is governed by a directly elected County Executive, with legislative functions performed by a Board of County Commissioners comprised of seven members who are elected at-large to three-year terms in partisan elections on a staggered basis, with either two or three seats coming up for election each November; a Chairman and Vice Chairman are selected from among its seven members at a reorganization meeting held every January. As of 2025, the county executive is James J. Tedesco III (D, Paramus), whose four-year term of office ends December 31, 2026.

Bergen County's Commissioners are Chair Mary J. Amoroso (D, Mahwah, 2025), Vice Chair Steven A. Tanelli (D, North Arlington, 2027), Chair Pro Tem Joan Voss (D, Fort Lee, 2026), Rafael Marte (D, Bergenfield, 2026), Germaine M. Ortiz (D, Emerson, 2025), Thomas J. Sullivan Jr. (D, Montvale, 2025) and Tracy Silna Zur (D, Franklin Lakes, 2027).

Bergen County's elected constitutional officials are Clerk John S. Hogan (D, Northvale, 2026), Sheriff Anthony Cureton (D, Englewood, 2027) and Surrogate Michael R. Dressler (D, Cresskill, 2026).

=== Politics ===
As of March 2011, there were a total of 5,008 registered voters in Little Ferry, of which 1,511 (30.2% vs. 31.7% countywide) were registered as Democrats, 634 (12.7% vs. 21.1%) were registered as Republicans and 2,860 (57.1% vs. 47.1%) were registered as Unaffiliated. There were 3 voters registered as Libertarians or Greens. Among the borough's 2010 Census population, 47.1% (vs. 57.1% in Bergen County) were registered to vote, including 58.7% of those ages 18 and over (vs. 73.7% countywide).

Gubernatorial election results for Little Ferry
Year	Republican		Democratic		Third party(ies)	
Year	No.	%	No.	%	No.	%
2025	1,052	38.34%	1,677	61.12%	15	0.55%
2021	943	46.75%	1,058	52.45%	16	0.79%
2017	596	38.60%	923	59.78%	25	1.62%
2013	1,226	62.71%	716	36.62%	13	0.66%
2009	908	41.37%	1,160	52.85%	127	5.79%
2005	860	35.61%	1,490	61.70%	65	2.69%

In the 2012 presidential election, Democrat Barack Obama received 2,024 votes (64.1% vs. 54.8% countywide), ahead of Republican Mitt Romney with 1,091 votes (34.5% vs. 43.5%) and other candidates with 25 votes (0.8% vs. 0.9%), among the 3,159 ballots cast by the borough's 5,344 registered voters, for a turnout of 59.1% (vs. 70.4% in Bergen County). In the 2008 presidential election, Democrat Barack Obama received 2,237 votes (58.2% vs. 53.9% countywide), ahead of Republican John McCain with 1,537 votes (40.0% vs. 44.5%) and other candidates with 38 votes (1.0% vs. 0.8%), among the 3,844 ballots cast by the borough's 5,393 registered voters, for a turnout of 71.3% (vs. 76.8% in Bergen County). In the 2004 presidential election, Democrat John Kerry received 2,064 votes (54.9% vs. 51.7% countywide), ahead of Republican George W. Bush with 1,645 votes (43.8% vs. 47.2%) and other candidates with 29 votes (0.8% vs. 0.7%), among the 3,759 ballots cast by the borough's 5,335 registered voters, for a turnout of 70.5% (vs. 76.9% in the whole county).

Presidential elections results
Year	Republican	Democratic
2024	49.7% 2,014	47.0% 1,903
2020	40.8% 1,873	58.1% 2,665
2016	41.3% 1,491	55.6% 2,007
2012	34.5% 1,091	64.1% 2,024
2008	40.0% 1,537	58.2% 2,237
2004	43.8% 1,645	54.9% 2,064

In the 2013 gubernatorial election, Republican Chris Christie received 62.7% of the vote (1,226 cast), ahead of Democrat Barbara Buono with 36.6% (716 votes), and other candidates with 0.7% (13 votes), among the 2,012 ballots cast by the borough's 5,051 registered voters (57 ballots were spoiled), for a turnout of 39.8%. In the 2009 gubernatorial election, Democrat Jon Corzine received 1,160 ballots cast (52.1% vs. 48.0% countywide), ahead of Republican Chris Christie with 908 votes (40.8% vs. 45.8%), Independent Chris Daggett with 114 votes (5.1% vs. 4.7%) and other candidates with 13 votes (0.6% vs. 0.5%), among the 2,225 ballots cast by the borough's 5,180 registered voters, yielding a 43.0% turnout (vs. 50.0% in the county).

United States Senate election results for Little Ferry1
Year	Republican		Democratic		Third party(ies)	
Year	No.	%	No.	%	No.	%
2024	1,685	45.34%	1,906	51.29%	125	3.36%
2018	960	38.49%	1,443	57.86%	91	3.65%
2012	903	31.71%	1,904	66.85%	41	1.44%
2006	759	36.83%	1,273	61.77%	29	1.41%

United States Senate election results for Little Ferry2
Year	Republican		Democratic		Third party(ies)	
Year	No.	%	No.	%	No.	%
2020	1,630	36.82%	2,700	60.99%	97	2.19%
2014	632	39.04%	961	59.36%	26	1.61%
2013	445	42.87%	585	56.36%	8	0.77%
2008	1,187	34.97%	2,151	63.38%	56	1.65%

== Education ==
The Little Ferry Public Schools serve students in pre-kindergarten through eighth grade. As of the 2022–23 school year, the district, comprised of two schools, had an enrollment of 806 students and 84.0 classroom teachers (on an FTE basis), for a student–teacher ratio of 9.6:1. The district's two school buildings are located across the street from each other. Schools in the district (with 2022–23 enrollment data from the National Center for Education Statistics) are Washington Elementary School with 445 students in grades PreK-4 and Memorial Middle School with 342 students in grades 5-8.

As Little Ferry does not have its own high school, public school students from the borough attend Ridgefield Park High School in Ridgefield Park for ninth through twelfth grades as part of a sending/receiving relationship with the Ridgefield Park Public Schools that has been in place since 1953. As of the 2022–23 school year, the school had an enrollment of 1,174 students and 87.8 classroom teachers (on an FTE basis), for a student–teacher ratio of 13.4:1.

Public school students from the borough, and all of Bergen County, are eligible to attend the secondary education programs offered by the Bergen County Technical Schools, which include the Bergen County Academies in Hackensack, Applied Technology High School, located at Bergen Community College in Paramus, and the Bergen County Technical High Schools in Teterboro and Paramus. The district offers programs on a shared-time or full-time basis, with admission based on a selective application process and tuition covered by the student's home school district.

== Transportation ==
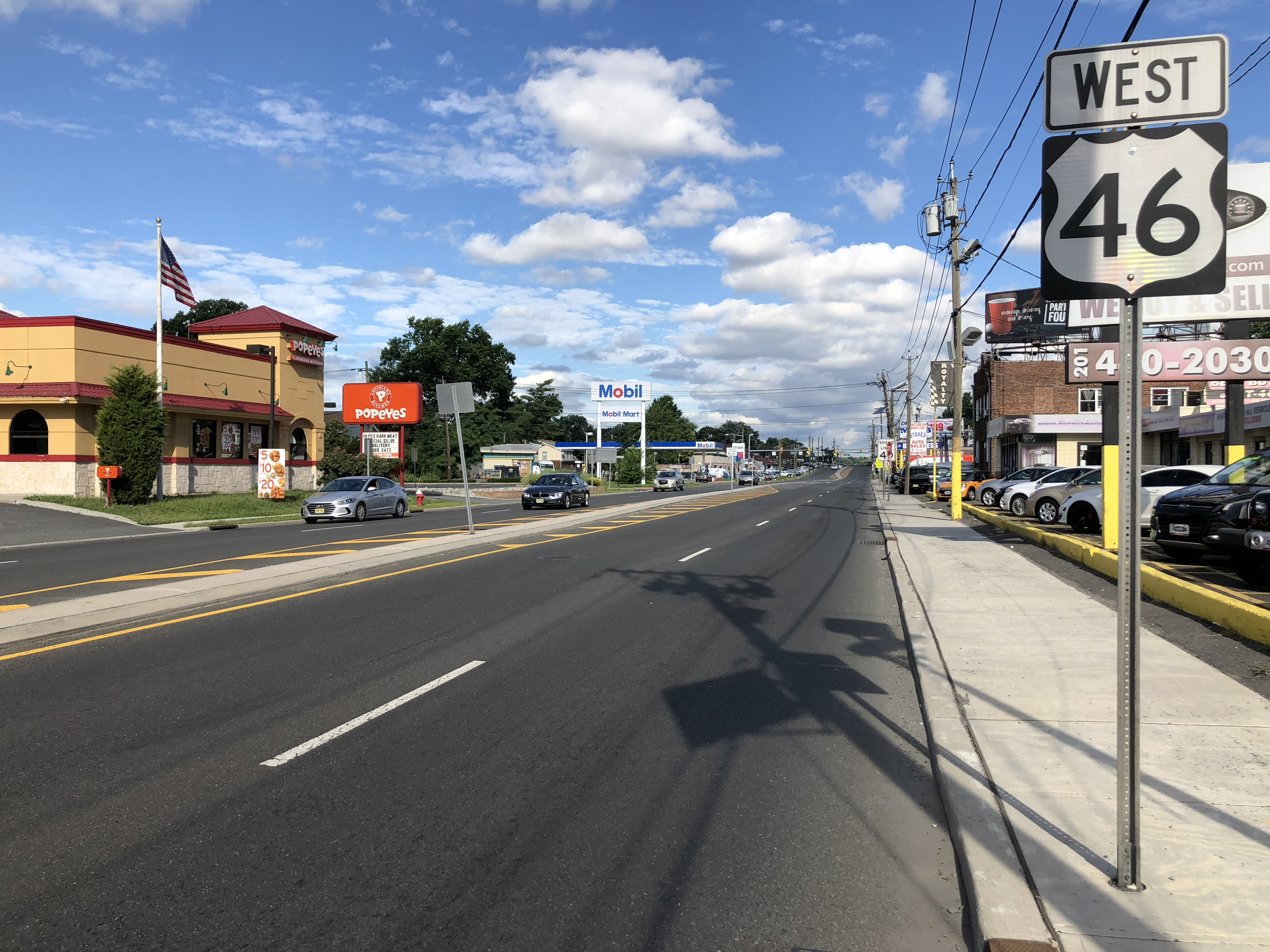
View west along U.S. Route 46 just west of the former Little Ferry Circle in Little Ferry

=== Roads and highways ===
As of May 2010, the borough had a total of 20.20 miles (32.51 km) of roadways, of which 15.95 miles (25.67 km) were maintained by the municipality, 3.42 miles (5.50 km) by Bergen County and 0.83 miles (1.34 km) by the New Jersey Department of Transportation.

The Little Ferry Circle connected U.S. Route 46 and Bergen Turnpike. The circle was originally constructed in 1933 in conjunction with the nearby Route 46 Hackensack River Bridge, which crosses the river to Ridgefield Park and beyond to the George Washington Bridge.The circle was largely reconstructed in 1985, allowing vehicles traveling on Route 46 to pass directly through the circle. The circle has been a constant site of accidents, with 40-50 accidents per year at the circle each year from 2004 through 2006. In March 2007, the New Jersey Department of Transportation proposed its latest plan to address issues at the circle. The plan would realign the circle into a straight intersection, complete with turning lanes; prohibit left turns onto many residential streets; and would include construction of a pump station to move water off the oft-flooded highway and into the Hackensack River. This plan was later completed, with the circle no longer in existence.

=== Public transportation ===
NJ Transit bus routes 161 and 165 provide service between Little Ferry and the Port Authority Bus Terminal in Midtown Manhattan, with local service on the 772 route.

The Little Ferry Seaplane Base (FAA LID: 2N7) is a public-use seaplane base located 1-mile (1.6 km) east of the borough's central business district, on the Hackensack River. The base is privately owned.

== Notable people ==
People who were born in, residents of, or otherwise closely associated with Little Ferry include:

- Tom Boisture (1931–2011), American football high school / college coach and NFL scout who was the head of player personnel for the New York Giants
- Oscar Gamble (1949–2018), former outfielder / designated hitter who played for the New York Yankees
- Phil Hawes (born 1989), mixed martial artist who competes in the Middleweight division of the Ultimate Fighting Championship
- Bill Lovett (1894–1923), gangster
- Ambar Lucid (born 2001), singer-songwriter, musician
- Margherita Marchione (1922–2021), nun, writer, teacher and apologeticist, who dedicated herself in her later years to the defense of Pope Pius XII and his failure to save more Jews from the Nazis during The Holocaust
- Pete Michels (born 1964), animation director, whose credits include The Simpsons, Family Guy and Rick and Morty
- Chico Resch (born 1949), retired ice hockey goaltender and television sportscaster who played 14 seasons in the NHL for the New York Islanders and New Jersey Devils
- Buddy Valastro (born 1977), star of Cake Boss, who was presented with the "keys to the city" of Little Ferry in 2010

== Sources ==
- Municipal Incorporations of the State of New Jersey (according to Counties) prepared by the Division of Local Government, Department of the Treasury (New Jersey); December 1, 1958.
- Clayton, W. Woodford; and Nelson, William. History of Bergen and Passaic Counties, New Jersey, with Biographical Sketches of Many of its Pioneers and Prominent Men. Philadelphia: Everts and Peck, 1882.
- Harvey, Cornelius Burnham (ed.), Genealogical History of Hudson and Bergen Counties, New Jersey. New York: New Jersey Genealogical Publishing Co., 1900.
- Van Valen, James M. History of Bergen County, New Jersey. New York: New Jersey Publishing and Engraving Co., 1900.
- Westervelt, Frances A. (Frances Augusta), 1858–1942, History of Bergen County, New Jersey, 1630–1923, Lewis Historical Publishing Company, 1923.
