= Ridgefield Park High School =

High school in Bergen County, New Jersey, US

Ridgefield Park Junior-Senior High School

Location
- 1 Ozzie Nelson Drive; Ridgefield Park, Bergen County, New Jersey 07660; United States; 40.859861°N 74.014456°W

Information
- Type: Public high school
- School district: Ridgefield Park Public Schools
- NCES School ID: 341380000754
- Principal: Melissa Murray Cavins
- Faculty: 94.6 FTEs
- Grades: 7-12
- Enrollment: 1,159 (as of 2024–25)
- Student to teacher ratio: 12.3:1
- Colors: Scarlet and white
- Athletics conference: Big North Conference (general); North Jersey Super Football Conference (football)
- Team name: Scarlets
- Rival: Cliffside Park High School
- Newspaper: Scarlet Quill
- Website: rpjshs.rpps.net/o/rpjshs

Ridgefield Park Junior-Senior High School, commonly known as Ridgefield Park High School, is a six-year comprehensive community public high school that serves students in seventh through twelfth grade from Ridgefield Park, in Bergen County, in the U.S. state of New Jersey, operating as the lone secondary school of the Ridgefield Park Public Schools.

As of the 2024–25 school year, the school had an enrollment of 1,159 students and 94.6 classroom teachers (on an FTE basis), for a student–teacher ratio of 12.3:1. There were 498 students (43.0% of enrollment) eligible for free lunch and 127 (11.0% of students) eligible for reduced-cost lunch.

Students from Little Ferry attend the district's high school as part of a sending/receiving relationship with the Little Ferry Public Schools that has been in place since 1953. The school has been accredited by the Middle States Association of Colleges and Schools Commission on Elementary and Secondary Schools since 1930.

== History ==
In 1916, Ridgefield Park High School was the subject of a groundbreaking ruling by the New Jersey Commissioner of Education, who ruled that teachers could remove their jackets while in class. A principal and teacher at the high school had been removed from his duties, based on charges against him that included 'conduct unbecoming a teacher' related to the removal of his coat while teaching one day. The charges were dismissed and the teacher was reinstated.

In March 2006, alumnus Gregory Olsen (RPHS '62), an entrepreneur who paid $20 million to become the world's third paying space tourist visited his alma mater to share his experiences in space.

== Awards, recognition and rankings ==
For the 2005-06 school year, Ridgefield Park High School was one of 22 schools statewide selected as Governor's School of Excellence Winners, an award given to schools that have demonstrated significant academic improvement over the previous two academic years.

A team of students was one of five finalists in the 2004 New Jersey Business Idea Competition Winners at Fairleigh Dickinson University representing the Northern Region, which covers Bergen, Essex, Morris, Passaic, Sussex and Warren Counties. Three other RPHS teams were semi-finalists.

The school was the 209th-ranked public high school in New Jersey out of 339 schools statewide in New Jersey Monthly magazine's September 2014 cover story on the state's "Top Public High Schools", using a new ranking methodology. The school had been ranked 237th in the state of 328 schools in 2012, after being ranked 207th in 2010 out of 322 schools listed. The magazine ranked the school 180th in 2008 out of 316 schools. The school was ranked 161st in the magazine's September 2006 issue, which surveyed 316 schools across the state. Schooldigger.com ranked the school tied for 145th out of 381 public high schools statewide in its 2011 rankings (a decrease of 25 positions from the 2010 ranking) which were based on the combined percentage of students classified as proficient or above proficient on the mathematics (81.3%) and language arts literacy (96.7%) components of the High School Proficiency Assessment (HSPA).

== Athletics ==
The Ridgefield Park High School Scarlets compete in the Big North Conference, which is comprised of public and private high schools in Bergen and Passaic counties, and was established following a reorganization of sports leagues in Northern New Jersey by the New Jersey State Interscholastic Athletic Association (NJISAA). Prior to the 2010 realignment, the school had competed in the Bergen County Scholastic League (BCSL) American Conference, which included public and private high schools located in Bergen and Hudson counties. With 667 students in grades 10-12, the school was classified by the NJSIAA for the 2019–20 school year as Group IV for most athletic competition purposes, which included schools with an enrollment of 486 to 758 students in that grade range. The football team competes in the American Red division of the North Jersey Super Football Conference, which includes 112 schools competing in 20 divisions, making it the nation's biggest football-only high school sports league. The school was classified by the NJSIAA as Group III North for football for 2024–2026, which included schools with 700 to 884 students.

The school participates in a joint wrestling team with Bogota High School as the host school / lead agency. The co-op program operates under agreements scheduled to expire at the end of the 2023–24 school year.

The boys' basketball team won the Group III state championship in 1924 (defeating Glen Ridge High School in the tournament final), 1926 (vs. Princeton High School), 1927 (vs. Roselle Park High School), 1934 (vs. Woodbury High School), 1944 (vs. Rahway High School), and won the Group II title in 1960 (vs. Riverside High School). The team won the 1924 state title in Class B (since recategorized as Group III) with a 31-27 overtime win against Glen Ridge in the championship game played at the Jersey City Armory. The 1926 team won the Class B (Group III) title with a 23-21 win against Princeton in the finals. A 40-25 win against Roselle Park gave the team the 1927 Class B (Group III) state title.

The baseball team won the Group III state championship in 1974 (defeating Franklin High School in the final game of the tournament) and 1977 (vs. Rancocas Valley Regional High School). The 1974 team defeated Franklin by a score of 4-1 in the Group III championship game to finish the season at 23-4. The 1977 team finished the season with a 24-9 record after winning the Group III title with a 2-1 victory against Rancocas Valley in the championship game.

The football team won the NJSIAA North I Group III state sectional championships in both 1975 and 1976, and won the North I Group II state titles in 1995 and 1996. The 1975 team finished the season with a 10-0-1 record after winning the North I Group III sectional title after defeating Northern Highlands Regional High School by a score of 10-8 in the championship game. The school has maintained a rivalry with Cliffside Park High School since the two schools first played each other, which was listed by The Record as one of the best in Bergen and Passaic counties; though the first game between the two schools was earlier, from 1950 through the 2017 season, Ridgefield Park is ahead with a 38-20-2 record in games between the two schools.

The girls fencing team was the overall team champion in 1978.

The cross country team won both the Big North Division Championship and the County Group C Championship in the 2011 fall cross country season. The team hadn't won a division championship since 1985 and had never won a county championship title. The team finished off their 2011 season with an undefeated dual meet record and several championship titles, including the Group 1-2 Maroon Invitational, the program's first invitational championship.

== Popular culture ==
13 of the 17 students featured in the 1978 documentary film Scared Straight! were from Ridgefield Park High School. Over 300 students, nearly a quarter of the school's enrollment, had voluntarily participated in the program at Rahway State Prison (now formally known as East Jersey State Prison), in which the students were given a hard look at the "physical and psychological brutality of prison life." The program was credited with contributing to a sharp drop in teen-aged crime in Ridgefield Park from 1976 to 1978.

Ridgefield Park High School was featured on TruTV's The Principal's Office in 2009.

== Administration ==
The school's principal is Melissa Murray Cavins. Her core administrative team includes two assistant principals and the director of athletics.

== Notable alumni ==
- Alex Gaston (1893-1979), Major League Baseball catcher who played for the New York Giants and Boston Red Sox
- Leonard W. Hatton Jr. (1956-2001, class of 1975), special agent of the Federal Bureau of Investigation who was killed in the September 11 terrorist attacks on the World Trade Center when he entered one of the towers to help evacuate the occupants and stayed when the towers collapsed
- John Huchra (1948-2010, class of 1966), astronomer and professor, who was the Vice Provost for Research Policy at Harvard University and a Professor of Astronomy at the Harvard-Smithsonian Center for Astrophysics
- Louis F. Kosco (born 1932, class of 1950), politician who served in both the New Jersey General Assembly and the New Jersey Senate
- Robert A. Lewis (1918-1983), co-pilot of the Enola Gay, the plane which dropped the atomic bomb on Hiroshima on August 6, 1945
- Steve Lonegan (born 1956), former mayor of Bogota, New Jersey from 1995-2007
- Dick Messner (1907–1972), bandleader who led a sweet-styled dance orchestra bearing his name from about 1938 to about 1942
- Johnny Messner (1909-1986, class of 1928), bandleader, composer, saxophonist, and vocalist during the big band/swing heyday
- Pete Michels (born 1964, class of 1983), animation director who has directed episodes of The Simpsons, Family Guy and Rick and Morty
- Ozzie Nelson (1906-1975), band leader and TV star
- Gregory Olsen (born 1945), entrepreneur and scientist who in October 2005 became the third private citizen to make a paid trip into space with Space Adventures
- Hatch Rosdahl (1941-2004), professional football player
- Daniel Ruch (born 1983), assistant soccer coach with Virginia Wesleyan who played professionally for two years for the Virginia Beach Mariners and the Wilmington Hammerheads
- Hal Turner (born 1962), conservative talk radio host
- Buddy Valastro (born 1977), owner of Carlo's Bakery in Hoboken, New Jersey and star of the TLC show Cake Boss
- George Warrington (1952-2007, class of 1970), transportation official, who served NJ Transit for 28 years, latterly in the post of executive director
