= Leonard W. Hatton Jr. =

American special agent (1956–2001)

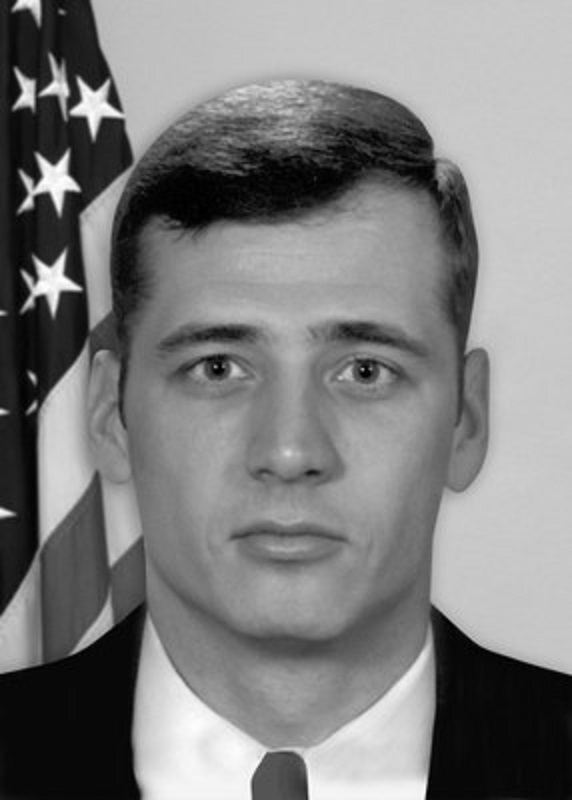
- FBI Special Agent Leonard Hatton
- Born: August 17, 1956; Teaneck, New Jersey, U.S.
- Died: September 11, 2001 (aged 45); South Tower, World Trade Center, New York City, U.S.
- Cause of death: Collapse of 2 World Trade Center during the September 11 attacks
- Resting place: Ridgefield Park, New Jersey
- Monuments: National September 11 Memorial & Museum Explosive Ordnance Disposal Memorial, Eglin Air Force Base, Florida
- Education: National University
- Occupation: Special agent
- Employer: Federal Bureau of Investigation
- Children: 4

Leonard William Hatton Jr. (August 17, 1956 – September 11, 2001) was an American special agent of the Federal Bureau of Investigation (FBI). He was killed in the September 11 attacks on the World Trade Center in New York City when he entered one of the towers to help evacuate the occupants and stayed when the towers collapsed.

== Early life and personal life ==
Leonard W. Hatton Jr. was born in Teaneck, New Jersey, and lived in Ridgefield Park, New Jersey, to Marilyn Hatton and Leonard Hatton Sr. who was a Ridgefield Park police officer. He graduated with the class of 1975 at Ridgefield Park High School, where was a halfback on the school's football team. He then attended Jersey City State College as an ROTC student, receiving his bachelor's in criminal justice. Shortly after, while in the United States Marine Corps he completed studies in forensic science at National University in San Diego. In 1978 he married his high school sweetheart, with whom he had four children.

== Career ==
After six years of active duty, including a stint as a military police officer, Hatton joined the FBI in New Orleans in 1985, and worked briefly in a small Louisiana office. In 1991, he was assigned to New York City as a member of an investigative team working on a bank robbery case. Leonard Hatton's main job was an FBI specialist in explosives and evidence recovery, where he worked until his death. In addition to cracking a number of high-profile bank robbery and kidnapping cases, he investigated international terrorist attacks such as the 1993 World Trade Center bombing, the 1998 United States embassy bombings, and the 2000 USS Cole bombing. Three months before the September 11 attacks, he had testified in the trial of a follower of the Islamic terrorist group al-Qaeda.

=== September 11 attacks ===
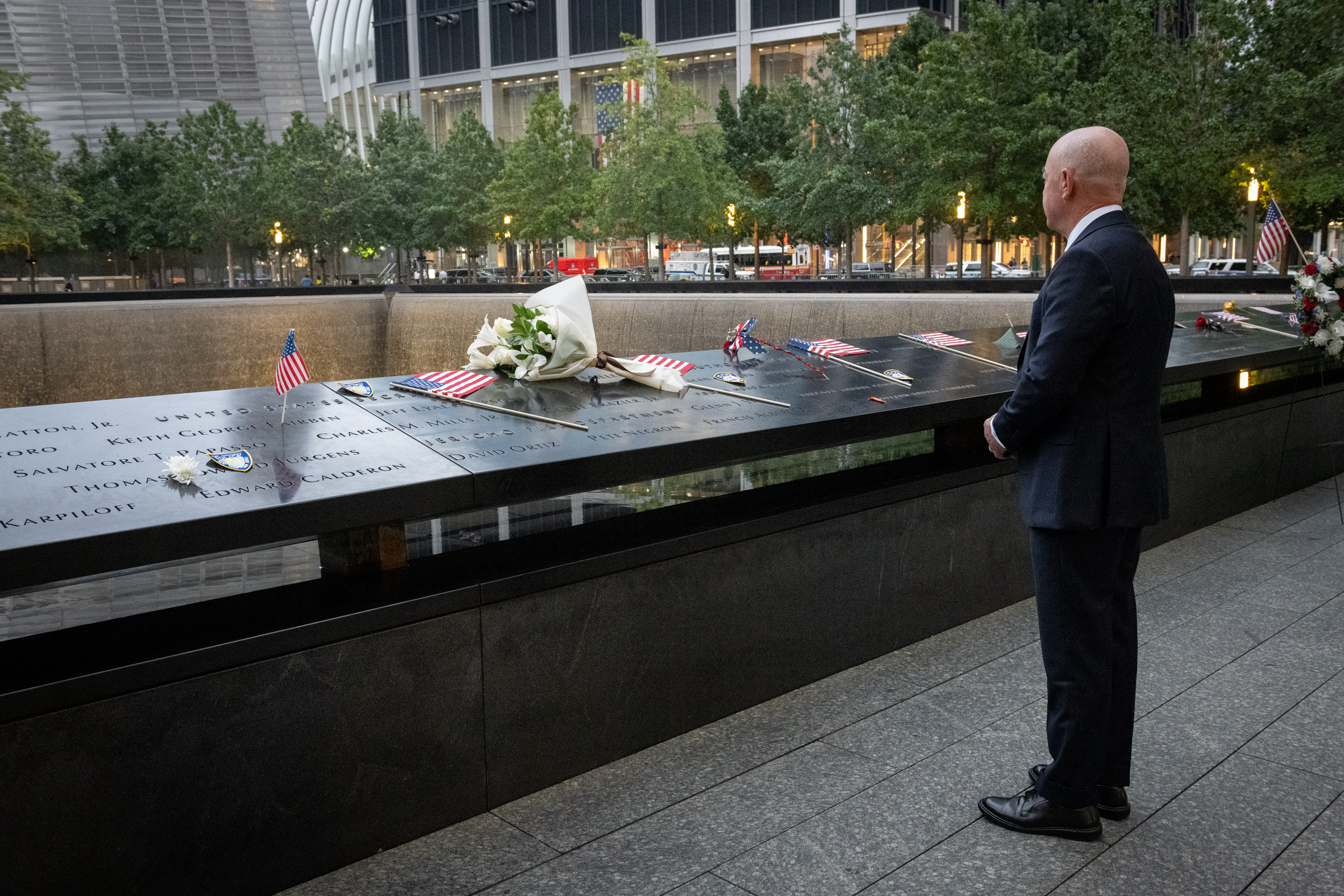
Name panel S-26, South Pool of the National September 11 Memorial & Museum, with Hatton's name shown on the upper-left corner

On the morning of September 11, 2001, Hatton was on his way to work when he saw the North Tower of the World Trade Center on fire after being struck by American Airlines Flight 11 at 8:46 a.m. According to eyewitness accounts, he turned back to help. On his own initiative, he responded directly to the North Tower, where he assumed a position on the roof of the Marriott World Trade Center. From his vantage point, he radioed his squad from atop the hotel and reported that civilians were jumping from the North Tower. He radioed again from the roof of at 9:03 a.m., when United Airlines Flight 175 struck the South Tower. Because of falling debris, he moved from the roof and joined with New York City Fire Department (FDNY) firefighters in evacuating the civilians trapped within the South Tower. One civilian survivor told investigators that Hatton guided him to safety and then went back into the South Tower. Asking where Hatton was going, his last response was "back into the building". Hatton continued to stay in the South Tower to help evacuate the civilians in the building when it collapsed at 9:59 a.m., killing him, along with many others inside the South Tower instantly.

== Legacy ==
At the National September 11 Memorial, Hatton is memorialized at the South Pool, on Panel S-26. Hatton also has a memorial stone inscribed at the Explosive Ordnance Disposal Memorial. In 2002, the Leonard W. Hatton Memorial Golf Classic was established in Colts Neck Township, New Jersey, in dedication to his memory and has held an annual golf memorial since. All proceeds are donated to the Burchette, Conners, Ellington, Hereford, Lynch Memorial College Scholarship Fund. The Fund, a 501(c)(3) organization, provides college scholarships to the children of deceased FBI Special Agents. As of September 8, 2020, the Hatton Memorial Golf Classic has raised more than $3,564,400 for the Fund.
