= West View, New Jersey =

Populated place in Bergen County, New Jersey, US

- Unincorporated community
- Location of West View in Bergen County Inset: Location of county within the state of New Jersey West View, New Jersey (New Jersey) West View, New Jersey (the United States)
- Coordinates: 40°51′54″N 74°01′40″W
- Country: United States
- State: New Jersey
- County: Bergen
- Borough: Ridgefield Park
- Elevation: 46 ft (14 m)
- Time zone: UTC−05:00 (Eastern (EST))
  - Summer (DST): UTC−04:00 (EDT)
- GNIS feature ID: 881734

West View is an unincorporated community located within Ridgefield Park in Bergen County, in the U.S. state of New Jersey. It was a stop on the West Shore Railroad.
