= Ridgefield Park, New Jersey =

Village in Bergen County, New Jersey, US

- Village
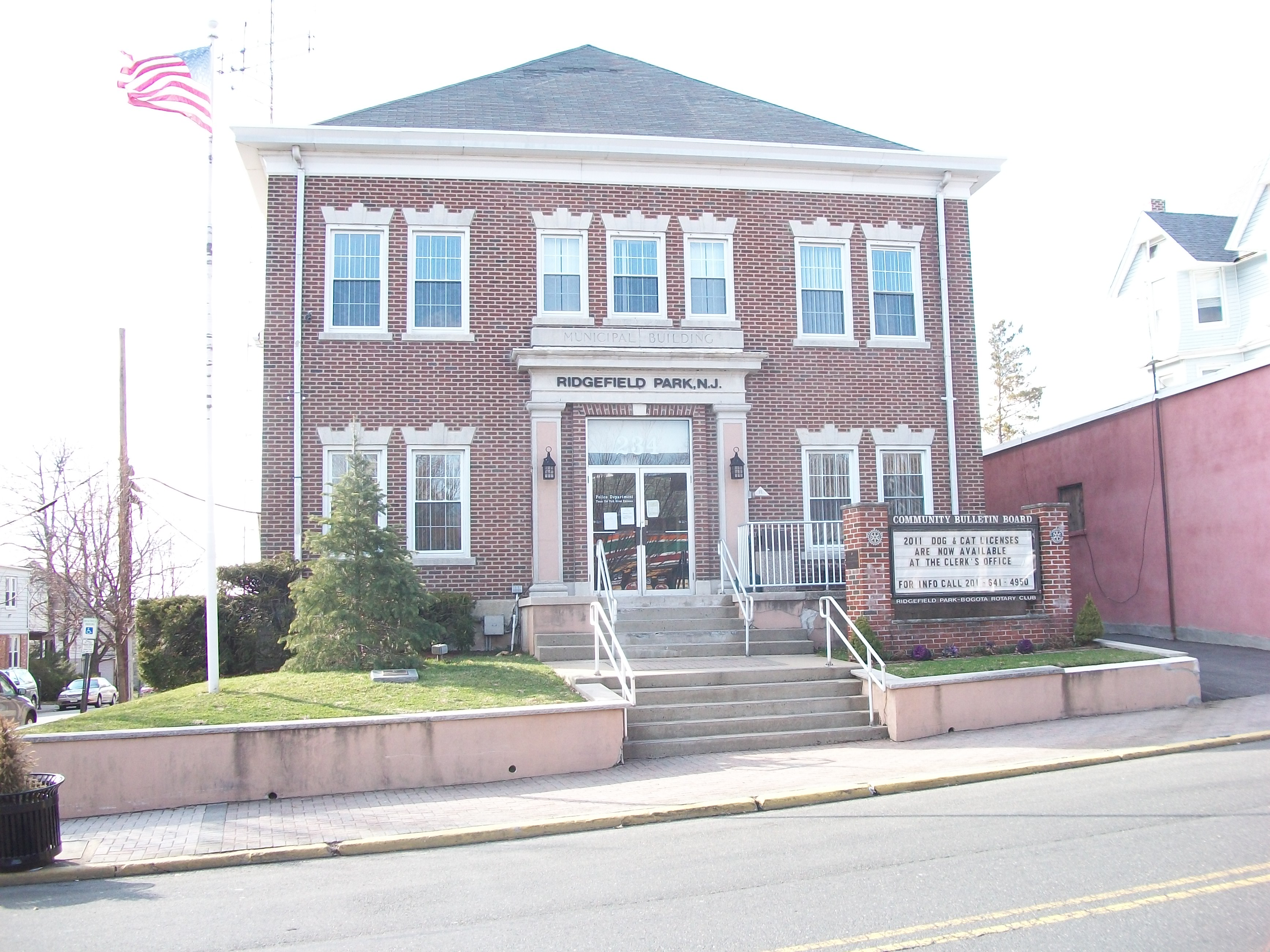
- Ridgefield Park municipal building

- Location of Ridgefield Park in Bergen County highlighted in red (left). Inset map: Location of Bergen County in New Jersey highlighted in orange (right).

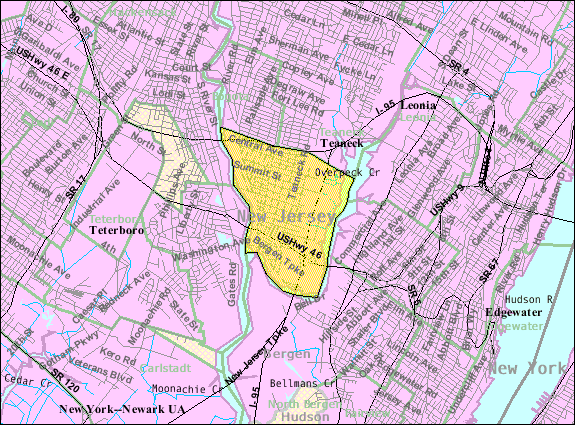
- Census Bureau map of Ridgefield Park, New Jersey
- Interactive map of Ridgefield Park, New Jersey
- Location in Bergen County Location in New Jersey Location in the United States
- Coordinates: 40.854705°N 74.019926°W
- Country: United States
- State: New Jersey
- County: Bergen
- Earliest European settlement: 1685
- Incorporated: June 15, 1892

Government
  - Type: Walsh Act
  - Body: Board of Commissioners
  - Mayor: Adam A. MacNeill (term ends May 23, 2028)
  - Municipal clerk: Tara O'Grady

Area
  - Total: 1.91 sq mi (4.95 km^{2})
  - Land: 1.71 sq mi (4.42 km^{2})
  - Water: 0.21 sq mi (0.54 km^{2}) 10.84%
  - Rank: 420th of 565 in state 51st of 70 in county
- Elevation: 56 ft (17 m)

Population (2020)
  - Total: 13,224
  - Estimate (2023): 13,135
  - Rank: 195th of 565 in state 26th of 70 in county
  - Density: 7,756/sq mi (2,995/km^{2})
  - Rank: 55th of 565 in state 17th of 70 in county
- Time zone: UTC−05:00 (Eastern (EST))
  - Summer (DST): UTC−04:00 (Eastern (EDT))
- ZIP Code: 07660
- Area code: 201
- FIPS code: 3400362940
- GNIS feature ID: 0885368
- Website: www.ridgefieldpark.org

Ridgefield Park is a village in Bergen County, in the U.S. state of New Jersey. As of the 2020 United States census, the village's population was 13,224, an increase of 495 (+3.9%) from the 2010 census count of 12,729, which in turn reflected a decline of 144 (−1.1%) from the 12,873 counted in the 2000 census. Of the 564 municipalities in the state, Ridgefield Park is one of only four with a village type of government, though it operates a Walsh Act (city commission) form of government. Of the four New Jersey villages, Loch Arbour also uses the commission form of government, while Ridgewood operates under the council-manager form, and the Township of South Orange Village operates under a special charter form with many characteristics of village government.

Ridgefield Park was formed as a village on June 15, 1892, within Ridgefield Township, based on the results of a referendum passed on June 6, 1892. Overpeck Township was formed on March 23, 1897, to be coextensive with Ridgefield Park village, and was created within Ridgefield Township for the purpose of administering a Board of Education. Portions of the village gained in both 1921 and 1926 were taken from Bogota and Teaneck. On May 31, 1938, Overpeck Township became Ridgefield Park Township. The village was named for the area's terrain.

The village's Fourth of July Parade, first established in 1894, is said to be the longest continuously celebrated such event in New Jersey and one of the oldest in the country. The village eliminated its July 4 fireworks in 2009, citing the $50,000 cost amid a difficult economy, but has restored the tradition since then.

== Geography ==
According to the United States Census Bureau, the village had a total area of 1.91 square miles (4.9 km^{2}), including 1.71 square miles (4.4 km^{2}) of land and 0.21 square miles (0.54 km^{2}) of water (10.84%).

The village borders the Bergen County municipalities of Bogota, Hackensack, Leonia, Little Ferry, Palisades Park, Ridgefield and Teaneck.

Unincorporated communities, localities and place names located partially or completely within the village include Overpeck and West View.

== Demographics ==
Historical population
Census	Pop.	Note	%±
1900	1,987		—
1910	4,512		127.1%
1920	8,575		90.0%
1930	10,764		25.5%
1940	11,277		4.8%
1950	11,993		6.3%
1960	12,701		5.9%
1970	13,990		10.1%
1980	12,738		−8.9%
1990	12,454		−2.2%
2000	12,873		3.4%
2010	12,729		−1.1%
2020	13,224		3.9%
2023 (est.)	13,135	▼	−0.7%
Population sources: 1900–1920 1900–1910; 1910–1930 1900–2020; 2000 2010 2020

=== Racial and ethnic composition ===
Ridgefield Park village, New Jersey – Racial and ethnic composition Note: the US Census treats Hispanic/Latino as an ethnic category. This table excludes Latinos from the racial categories and assigns them to a separate category. Hispanics/Latinos may be of any race.
Race / Ethnicity (NH = Non-Hispanic)	Pop 2000	Pop 2010	Pop 2020	% 2000	% 2010	% 2020
White alone (NH)	8,338	5,882	4,477	64.77%	46.21%	33.86%
Black or African American alone (NH)	446	581	649	3.46%	4.56%	4.91%
Native American or Alaska Native alone (NH)	15	15	8	0.12%	0.12%	0.06%
Asian alone (NH)	1,007	1,447	1,460	7.82%	11.37%	11.04%
Native Hawaiian or Pacific Islander alone (NH)	1	1	1	0.01%	0.01%	0.01%
Other race alone (NH)	18	41	93	0.14%	0.32%	0.70%
Mixed race or Multiracial (NH)	185	157	347	1.44%	1.23%	2.62%
Hispanic or Latino (any race)	2,863	4,605	6,189	22.24%	36.18%	46.80%
Total	12,873	12,729	13,224	100.00%	100.00%	100.00%

=== 2020 census ===
As of the 2020 census, Ridgefield Park had a population of 13,224. The population density was 7,756.0 per square mile (2,994.6/km^{2}).

Racially, 39.9% (5,272) of residents were White, 6.4% (851) were Black or African American, 0.9% (115) were American Indian and Alaska Native, 11.3% (1,489) were Asian, 0.0% (5) were Native Hawaiian and Other Pacific Islander, and 22.4% (2,960) were some other race; 19.1% (2,532) were from two or more races. Hispanic or Latino residents of any race were 46.8% (6,189) of the population.

The median age was 40.5 years. 19.8% of residents were under the age of 18 and 15.1% were 65 years of age or older. For every 100 females there were 92.7 males, and for every 100 females age 18 and over there were 89.9 males age 18 and over.

100.0% of residents lived in urban areas, while 0.0% lived in rural areas.

There were 4,986 households in Ridgefield Park, of which 30.9% had children under the age of 18 living in them. Of all households, 45.6% were married-couple households, 18.5% were households with a male householder and no spouse or partner present, and 30.9% were households with a female householder and no spouse or partner present. About 28.0% of all households were made up of individuals and 10.5% had someone living alone who was 65 years of age or older. There were 5,269 housing units, of which 5.4% were vacant. The homeowner vacancy rate was 1.5% and the rental vacancy rate was 4.3%.

=== Demographic estimates ===
According to Census Bureau estimates, 89.1% of residents were living in the same housing unit as one year earlier, and the average household size was 2.69.

An estimated 3.14% of residents were veterans, 37.1% were foreign-born, 91.3% of residents age 25 and older were high school graduates, and 38.5% held a bachelor's degree or higher. Mean travel time to work was 31.3 minutes.

=== 2010 census ===
The 2010 United States census counted 12,729 people, 4,851 households, and 3,274 families in the village. The population density was 7,385.6 people per square mile (2,851.6 people/km^{2}). There were 5,164 housing units at an average density of 2,996.2 units per square mile (1,156.8 units/km^{2}). The racial makeup was 66.09% (8,413) White, 6.40% (815) Black or African American, 0.35% (44) Native American, 11.48% (1,461) Asian, 0.01% (1) Pacific Islander, 11.93% (1,519) from other races, and 3.74% (476) from two or more races. Hispanic or Latino of any race were 36.18% (4,605) of the population.

Of the 4,851 households, 31.1% had children under the age of 18; 48.5% were married couples living together; 13.9% had a female householder with no husband present and 32.5% were non-families. Of all households, 27.7% were made up of individuals and 9.3% had someone living alone who was 65 years of age or older. The average household size was 2.62 and the average family size was 3.25.

21.9% of the population were under the age of 18, 8.5% from 18 to 24, 28.2% from 25 to 44, 28.9% from 45 to 64, and 12.5% who were 65 years of age or older. The median age was 39.3 years. For every 100 females, the population had 94.0 males. For every 100 females ages 18 and older there were 90.6 males.

The Census Bureau's 2006–2010 American Community Survey showed that (in 2010 inflation-adjusted dollars) median household income was $60,656 (with a margin of error of +/− $8,846) and the median family income was $83,189 (+/− $13,092). Males had a median income of $51,781 (+/− $2,949) versus $47,714 (+/− $8,394) for females. The per capita income for the village was $30,893 (+/− $2,038). About 3.1% of families and 5.0% of the population were below the poverty line, including 5.8% of those under age 18 and 10.2% of those age 65 or over.

Same-sex couples headed 34 households in 2010, an increase from the 21 counted in 2000.

=== 2000 census ===
As of the 2000 United States census there were 12,873 people, 5,012 households, and 3,242 families residing in the village. The population density was 7,435.7 people per square mile (2,870.9 people/km^{2}). There were 5,134 housing units at an average density of 1,145.8/km^{2} (2,968/mi^{2}). The racial makeup of the village was 78.20% White, 4.10% African American, 0.22% Native American, 7.85% Asian, 0.03% Pacific Islander, 6.50% from other races, and 3.09% from two or more races. Hispanic or Latino of any race were 22.24% of the population.

There were 5,012 households, out of which 29.7% had children under the age of 18 living with them, 49.7% were married couples living together, 11.2% had a female householder with no husband present, and 35.3% were non-families. 29.6% of all households were made up of individuals, and 9.5% had someone living alone who was 65 years of age or older. The average household size was 2.56 and the average family size was 3.24.

In the village, the population was spread out, with 22.4% under the age of 18, 7.2% from 18 to 24, 34.4% from 25 to 44, 23.1% from 45 to 64, and 12.9% who were 65 years of age or older. The median age was 37 years. For every 100 females, there were 91.5 males. For every 100 females age 18 and over, there were 88.6 males.

The median income for a household in the village was $51,825, and the median income for a family was $62,414. Males had a median income of $44,507 versus $35,217 for females. The per capita income for the village was $24,290. About 4.7% of families and 6.7% of the population were below the poverty line, including 6.9% of those under age 18 and 7.5% of those age 65 or over.

== Economy ==
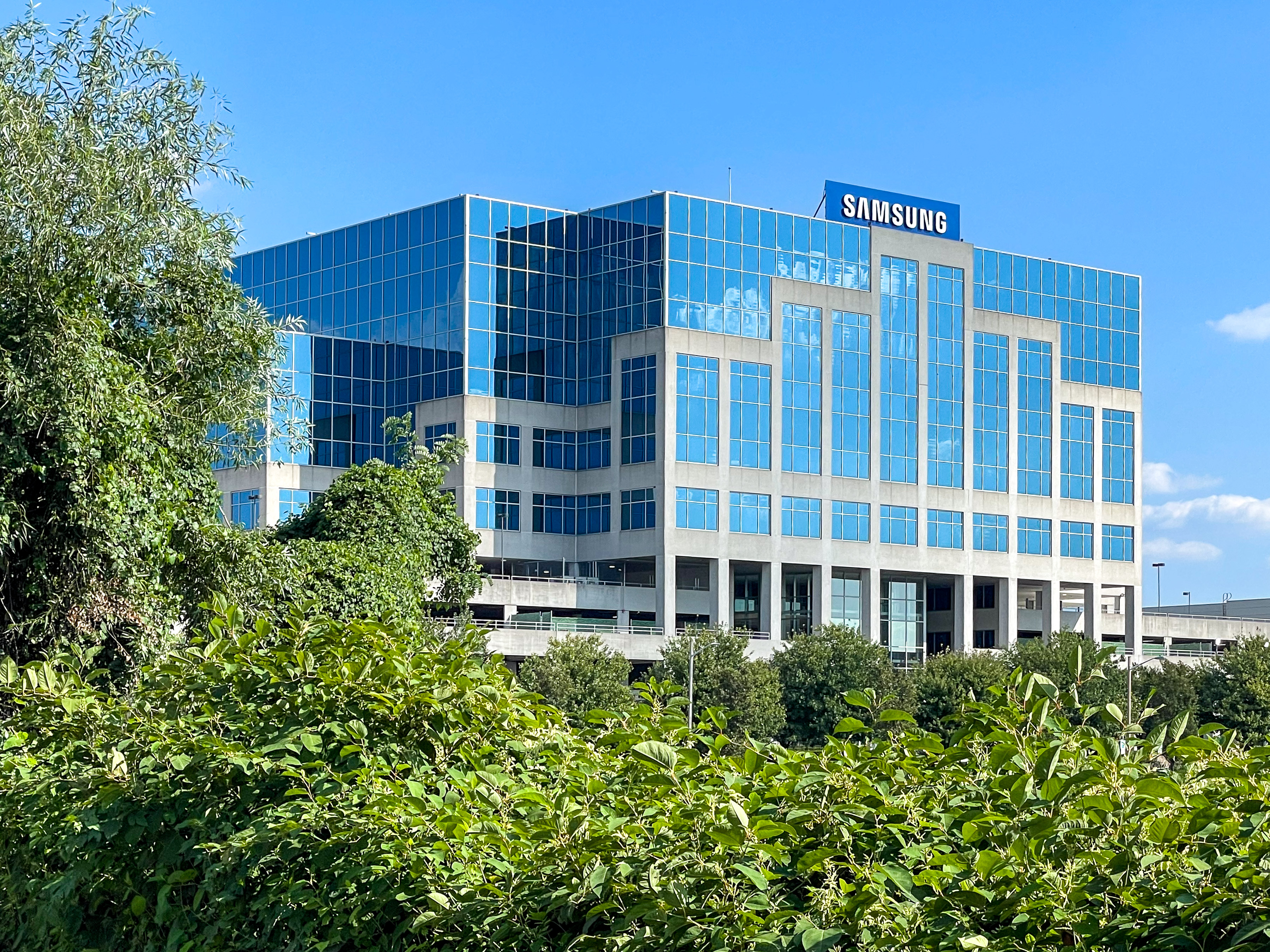
Samsung headquarters

Overpeck Corporate Office Park is located on Challenger Road on the east side of the village (east of I-95), to the south of Bergen County's Overpeck Park. The office park contains approximately 1,000,000 square feet (93,000 m^{2}) of Class-A office space which has undergone substantial renovations and upgrades. The Office Park also contains an AMC Movie Theater and Hilton Garden Inn Hotel. Corporate residents of Overpeck Corporate Park include the headquarters of American Stock Transfer and Samsung Electronics America, the latter of which announced plans to move to Englewood Cliffs in 2024.

== Government ==
=== Local government ===
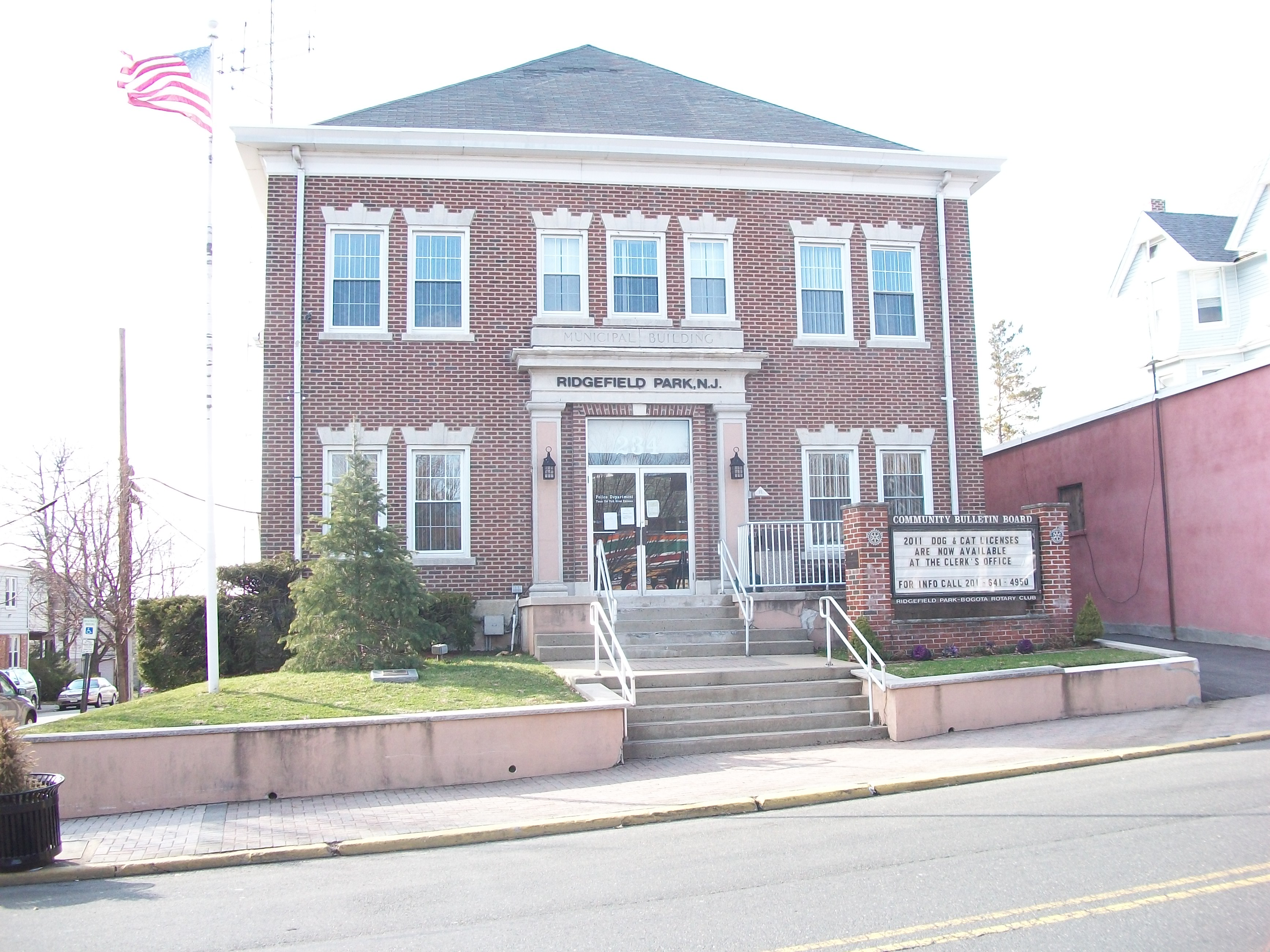
Municipal building in Ridgefield Park on Main Street

Ridgefield Park has been governed under the Walsh Act since 1912. The village is one of 30 municipalities (of the 564) statewide to use the commission form of government, down from a peak of 60 early in the 20th century; Ridgefield Park is one of six Walsh Act municipalities in North Jersey and most are in shore communities. The Board of Commissioners is comprised of five members, who are elected at-large on a non-partisan basis to serve four-year terms on a concurrent basis. The commissioners elect one commissioner as mayor, however the mayor is only responsible for his or her departments and serves as the chair of the commission.

As of 2026, the members of the Ridgefield Park Board of Commissioners are Mayor Adam A. MacNeill (Commissioner of Revenue and Finance), John H. Anlian (Commissioner of Public Safety), William G. Gerken (Commissioner of Public Affairs), Wanda C. Portorreal (Commissioner of Public Works) and Askar H. Mirza (Commissioner of Parks and Public Property), all serving concurrent terms of office ending on May 23, 2028.

In the election held on May 14, 2024, 19-year-old college student Askar Mirza defeated incumbent commissioner Mark Olson by a 2-vote margin, becoming the youngest commissioner ever elected in the village.

In June 2017, Theresa Kohles was appointed to fill the commissioner seat that became vacant following the resignation of Maggie Boyd. In the 2017 November general election, Kohles was elected to serve the balance of the term of office.

=== Federal, state, and county representation ===
Ridgefield Park is located in the 5th Congressional District and is part of New Jersey's 37th state legislative district.

For the 119th United States Congress, New Jersey's 5th congressional district is represented by Josh Gottheimer (D, Wyckoff). New Jersey is represented in the United States Senate by Democrats Cory Booker (Newark, term ends 2027) and Andy Kim (Moorestown, term ends 2031).

For the 2026–2027 session, the 37th legislative district of the New Jersey Legislature is represented in the New Jersey Senate by Gordon M. Johnson (D, Englewood) and in the General Assembly by Shama Haider (D, Tenafly) and Ellen Park (D, Englewood Cliffs).

Bergen County is governed by a directly elected County Executive, with legislative functions performed by a Board of County Commissioners comprised of seven members who are elected at-large to three-year terms in partisan elections on a staggered basis, with either two or three seats coming up for election each November; a Chairman and Vice Chairman are selected from among its seven members at a reorganization meeting held every January. As of 2025, the county executive is James J. Tedesco III (D, Paramus), whose four-year term of office ends December 31, 2026.

Bergen County's Commissioners are Chair Mary J. Amoroso (D, Mahwah, 2025), Vice Chair Steven A. Tanelli (D, North Arlington, 2027), Chair Pro Tem Joan Voss (D, Fort Lee, 2026), Rafael Marte (D, Bergenfield, 2026), Germaine M. Ortiz (D, Emerson, 2025), Thomas J. Sullivan Jr. (D, Montvale, 2025) and Tracy Silna Zur (D, Franklin Lakes, 2027).

Bergen County's elected constitutional officials are Clerk John S. Hogan (D, Northvale, 2026), Sheriff Anthony Cureton (D, Englewood, 2027) and Surrogate Michael R. Dressler (D, Cresskill, 2026).

=== Politics ===
United States presidential election results for Ridgefield Park 2024 2020 2016 2012 2008 2004
Year	Republican		Democratic		Third party(ies)	
Year	No.	%	No.	%	No.	%
2024	2,502	44.10%	3,033	53.45%	139	2.45%
2020	2,115	34.03%	4,029	64.82%	72	1.16%
2016	1,842	34.32%	3,359	62.59%	166	3.09%
2012	1,508	31.98%	3,162	67.06%	45	0.95%
2008	1,932	36.91%	3,256	62.20%	47	0.90%
2004	2,104	43.69%	2,681	55.67%	31	0.64%

As of March 2011, there were a total of 6,593 registered voters in Ridgefield Park, of which 2,249 (34.1% vs. 31.7% countywide) were registered as Democrats, 957 (14.5% vs. 21.1%) were registered as Republicans and 3,382 (51.3% vs. 47.1%) were registered as Unaffiliated. There were 5 voters registered as Libertarians or Greens. Among the village's 2010 Census population, 51.8% (vs. 57.1% in Bergen County) were registered to vote, including 66.4% of those ages 18 and over (vs. 73.7% countywide).

In the 2012 presidential election, Democrat Barack Obama received 3,162 votes here (66.3% vs. 54.8% countywide), ahead of Republican Mitt Romney with 1,508 votes (31.6% vs. 43.5%) and other candidates with 45 votes (0.9% vs. 0.9%), among the 4,768 ballots cast by the village's 7,035 registered voters, for a turnout of 67.8% (vs. 70.4% in Bergen County). In the 2008 presidential election, Democrat Barack Obama received 3,256 votes here (61.6% vs. 53.9% countywide), ahead of Republican John McCain with 1,932 votes (36.5% vs. 44.5%) and other candidates with 47 votes (0.9% vs. 0.8%), among the 5,288 ballots cast by the village's 6,980 registered voters, for a turnout of 75.8% (vs. 76.8% in Bergen County). In the 2004 presidential election, Democrat John Kerry received 2,681 votes here (55.4% vs. 51.7% countywide), ahead of Republican George W. Bush with 2,104 votes (43.5% vs. 47.2%) and other candidates with 31 votes (0.6% vs. 0.7%), among the 4,835 ballots cast by the village's 6,575 registered voters, for a turnout of 73.5% (vs. 76.9% in the whole county).

Gubernatorial election results for Ridgefield Park
Year	Republican		Democratic		Third party(ies)	
Year	No.	%	No.	%	No.	%
2025	1,363	34.06%	2,613	65.29%	26	0.65%
2021	1,248	39.33%	1,890	59.57%	35	1.10%
2017	896	34.09%	1,679	63.89%	53	2.02%
2013	1,473	55.65%	1,138	42.99%	36	1.36%
2009	1,223	40.01%	1,657	54.20%	177	5.79%
2005	1,163	39.53%	1,760	59.82%	19	0.65%

In the 2013 gubernatorial election, Republican Chris Christie received 55.6% of the vote (1,473 cast), ahead of Democrat Barbara Buono with 43.0% (1,138 votes), and other candidates with 1.4% (36 votes), among the 2,686 ballots cast by the village's 6,694 registered voters (39 ballots were spoiled), for a turnout of 40.1%. In the 2009 gubernatorial election, Democrat Jon Corzine received 1,657 ballots cast (53.7% vs. 48.0% countywide), ahead of Republican Chris Christie with 1,223 votes (39.6% vs. 45.8%), Independent Chris Daggett with 166 votes (5.4% vs. 4.7%) and other candidates with 11 votes (0.4% vs. 0.5%), among the 3,085 ballots cast by the village's 6,753 registered voters, yielding a 45.7% turnout (vs. 50.0% in the county).

United States Senate election results for Ridgefield Park1
Year	Republican		Democratic		Third party(ies)	
Year	No.	%	No.	%	No.	%
2024	2,113	40.78%	2,865	55.30%	203	3.92%
2018	1,432	34.67%	2,540	61.50%	158	3.83%
2012	1,263	29.59%	2,940	68.88%	65	1.52%
2006	1,153	38.63%	1,789	59.93%	43	1.44%

United States Senate election results for Ridgefield Park2
Year	Republican		Democratic		Third party(ies)	
Year	No.	%	No.	%	No.	%
2020	1,907	31.53%	3,976	65.73%	166	2.74%
2014	864	37.70%	1,393	60.78%	35	1.53%
2013	664	38.92%	1,019	59.73%	23	1.35%
2008	1,634	35.37%	2,925	63.31%	61	1.32%

== Education ==
The Ridgefield Park Public Schools serve students in pre-kindergarten through twelfth grade. As of the 2020–21 school year, the district, comprised of four schools, had an enrollment of 2,178 students and 180.0 classroom teachers (on an FTE basis), for a student–teacher ratio of 12.1:1. Schools in the district (with 2020–21 enrollment data from the National Center for Education Statistics) are Grant Elementary School with 244 students in grades K-6, Lincoln Elementary School with 374 students in grades PreK-6, Roosevelt Elementary School with 339 students in grades PreK-6 and Ridgefield Park High School with 1,189 students in grades 7–12.

Students from Little Ferry attend the high school as part of a sending/receiving relationship with the Little Ferry Public Schools that has been in place since 1953.

The district is one of the small number in the state with schools recognized by the National Blue Ribbon Schools Program in consecutive years, with Grant Elementary School earning the designation in 2010 and Lincoln Elementary School being honored in 2011.

Public school students from the borough, and all of Bergen County, are eligible to attend the secondary education programs offered by the Bergen County Technical Schools, which include the Bergen County Academies in Hackensack, and the Bergen Tech campus in Teterboro or Paramus. The district offers programs on a shared-time or full-time basis, with admission based on a selective application process and tuition covered by the student's home school district.

== Transportation ==
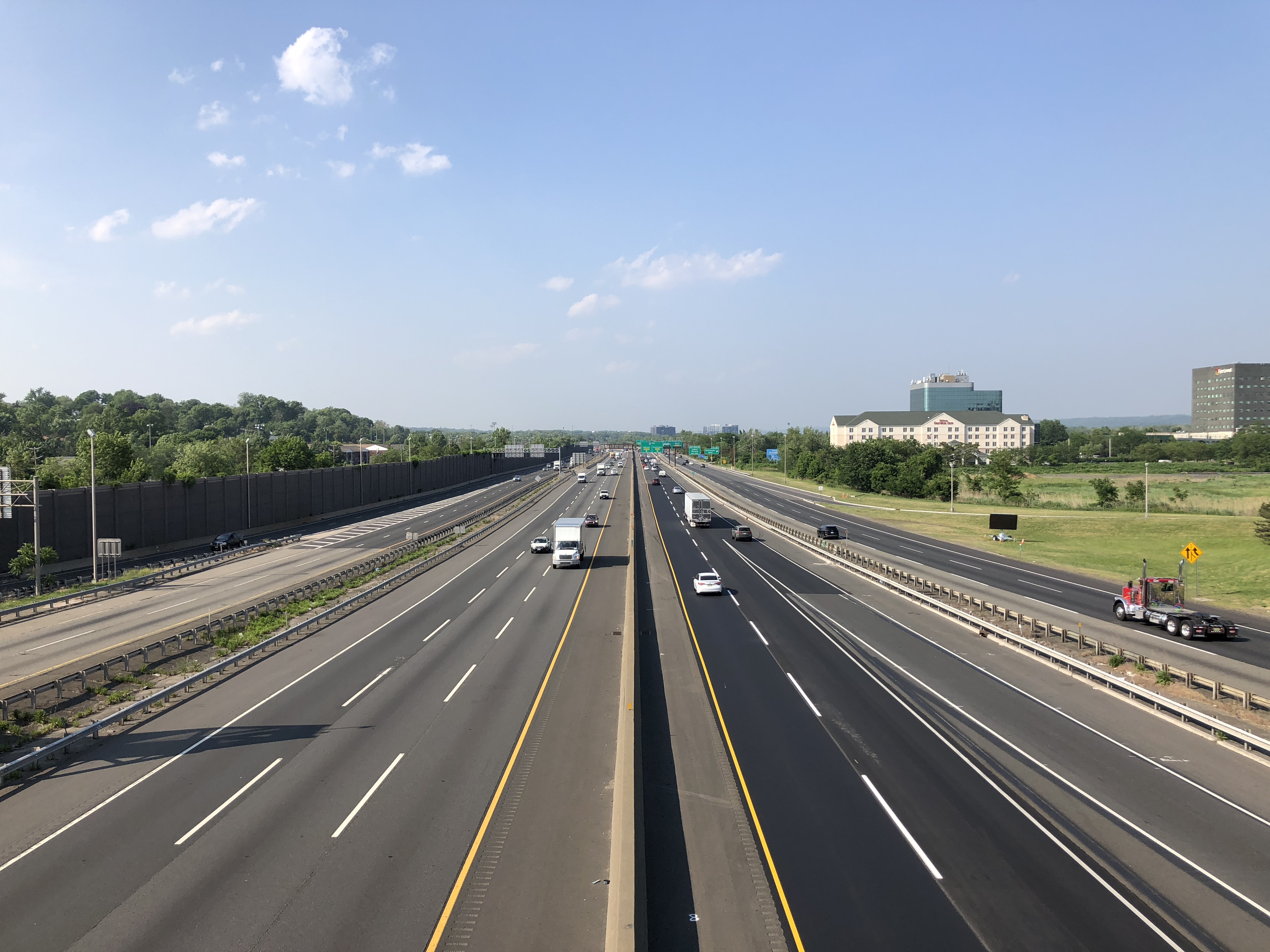
View north along the Interstate 95 (the New Jersey Turnpike) in Ridgefield Park

=== Roads and highways ===
As of 2014, the village had a total of 29.04 miles (46.74 km) of roadways, of which 21.64 miles (34.83 km) were maintained by the municipality, 4.38 miles (7.05 km) by Bergen County and 1.36 miles (2.19 km) by the New Jersey Department of Transportation and 1.66 miles (2.67 km) by the New Jersey Turnpike Authority.

Highways passing through the village include Interstate 80, Interstate 95 (the New Jersey Turnpike) and U.S. Route 46.

The historic Winant Avenue Bridge, also known as the Route 46 Hackensack River Bridge, crosses the river to Little Ferry. The double-leaf bascule bridge was constructed in 1934 and extends for 1,549 feet (472 m), with the draw bridge at the center of the span.

=== Public transportation ===
For much of the 20th century Ridgefield Park was served by the New York, Susquehanna and Western Railroad (NYSW) and the West Shore Railroad, a division of New York Central (NYCRR) at three passenger station in the village: Little Ferry Station, Ridgefield Park station and Westview station.

NJ Transit bus routes 155, 157, 161, 165, 167 and 168 provide service between Ridgefield Park and the Port Authority Bus Terminal in Midtown Manhattan, and the 83 route provides service to Hackensack and the Journal Square Transportation Center in Jersey City.

== Popular culture ==
Scenes in the 1998 movie Rounders, starring Matt Damon and Edward Norton, were filmed in the Elks Lodge.

== Notable people ==
People who were born in, residents of, or otherwise closely associated with Ridgefield Park include:

- Joan M. Clark (born 1922), former United States Ambassador to Malta
- Richard Easterlin (1926–2024), professor of economics at the University of Southern California, best known for the economic theory named after him, the Easterlin paradox
- Alex Gaston (1893–1979), MLB catcher who played for the New York Giants and Boston Red Sox
- Milt Gaston (1896–1996), right-handed pitcher in Major League Baseball from 1924 to 1934
- Jimmy Gnecco (born 1973), musician from the band Ours
- Leonard W. Hatton Jr. (1956–2001), special agent of the Federal Bureau of Investigation who was killed in the September 11 terrorist attacks on the World Trade Center when he entered one of the towers to help evacuate the occupants and stayed when the towers collapsed
- John Huchra (1948–2010), astronomer
- James Gordon Irving (1913–2012), commercial illustrator and painter, best known for illustrating the early Golden Guide series of nature books
- Jim Keogh (born 1948), author of nearly 100 books sold worldwide introduced PC programming nationally in his Popular Electronics magazine column in 1982
- Louis F. Kosco (born 1932), politician who served in both the New Jersey General Assembly and the New Jersey Senate
- Robert A. Lewis (1917–1983), co-pilot of the Enola Gay
- George Lowe (1895–1981), relief pitcher who appeared in a single game for the Cincinnati Reds during the 1920 season
- Bobby Messano (born 1954), artist, guitarist and musician
- Dick Messner (1907–1972), band leader who led a sweet-styled dance orchestra bearing his name from about 1938 to about 1942.
- Johnny Messner (1909–1986; class of 1928), bandleader, composer, saxophonist and vocalist during the big band/swing heyday
- Ozzie Nelson (1906–1975), actor
- Lawrence Nuesslein (1895–1971), sports shooter who competed in the 1920 Summer Olympics where he won a total of five medals: two gold medals, one silver and two bronze medals
- Gregory Olsen (born 1945), entrepreneur, engineer and scientist who, in October 2005, became the third private citizen to make a self-funded trip to the International Space Station
- Amelia Stone Quinton (1833–1926), social activist and advocate for Native American rights, who co-founded the Women's National Indian Association in 1883
- Hatch Rosdahl (1941–2004), football player who played for the Buffalo Bills and Kansas City Chiefs
- David Rothenberg (born 1933), Broadway producer and prisoners' rights activist
- Daniel Ruch (born 1983), assistant soccer coach with Virginia Wesleyan who played professionally for two years for the Virginia Beach Mariners and the Wilmington Hammerheads
- Hal Turner (born 1962), conservative talk radio host
- Al Vandeweghe (1920–2014) professional football player for the Buffalo Bisons of the All-America Football Conference in 1946
- George Warrington (1952–2007), served as executive director of NJ Transit
- Yoojin Grace Wuertz (born 1980), novelist who wrote the 2017 book Everything Belongs To Us

== Sources ==
- Municipal Incorporations of the State of New Jersey (according to Counties) prepared by the Division of Local Government, Department of the Treasury (New Jersey); December 1, 1958.
- Ridgefield Park 1685–1985
- Clayton, W. Woodford; and Nelson, William. History of Bergen and Passaic Counties, New Jersey, with Biographical Sketches of Many of its Pioneers and Prominent Men., Philadelphia: Everts and Peck, 1882.
- Harvey, Cornelius Burnham (ed.), Genealogical History of Hudson and Bergen Counties, New Jersey. New York: New Jersey Genealogical Publishing Co., 1900.
- Van Valen, James M. History of Bergen County, New Jersey. New York: New Jersey Publishing and Engraving Co., 1900.
- Westervelt, Frances A. (Frances Augusta), 1858–1942, History of Bergen County, New Jersey, 1630–1923, Lewis Historical Publishing Company, 1923.
