= Dick Messner =

American band leader (1907–1972)

- Born: Richard Messner; December 18, 1907; Manhattan, New York, U.S.
- Died: February 1, 1972 (aged 64)
- Genres: Big band, traditional pop
- Years active: 1923–1942
- Label: Melotone

Richard Messner (18 December 1907 – February 1972) was an American band leader. He led a sweet-styled dance orchestra bearing his name from about 1938 to about 1942. He flourished as a dance band pianist from about 1923 to about 1942.

== Career ==
A longtime resident of Ridgefield Park, New Jersey, Messner graduated from Ridgefield Park High School. Messner founded his orchestra around 1938, after 16 years performing with his four brothers as "The Five Messner Brothers" with himself as pianist, Johnny as violinist and clarinetist, Charlie (né Charles Messner; 1905–2003) (woodwinds), Bill (né William Messner; 1904–1982) on drums, and Fred (né Frederick Messner; born 1902) on violin. The Five Brothers made their radio broadcast debut in 1923 on NBC, then known as WJZ.

The Five Messner Brothers and, from 1938 to 1941, the Dick Messner Orchestra, and after World War II, the Johnny Messner Orchestra, performed on national radio broadcasts and regionally around Pennsylvania, New Jersey and New York.

== Notable musicians ==
- Bernice Margaret Healey (1917–1990) was, in 1938, a featured soprano vocalist with Dick Messner. He began singing on radio broadcasts as early as 1934.
- Homer Mensch, bassist, performed with the Orchestra at the Hotel McAlpin
- Norwood Linn, tenor from California
- Irene Collins, who, before Messner, was a featured vocalist with Fran Frey

== Record label ==
When the Messner brothers started the Philo (later Aladdin) label, Norman Granz was on board to produce a legendary session by Lester Young with Nat Cole on piano. Additional sessions followed.

== Experimentation ==
In 1936, Dick Messner introduced an idea in New York called "Tymphonic Music" — an ensemble of 10 Timpani, a harp and an augmented violin section in a band of 18 musicians. It was believed that the experiment was the first time that Timpani had been used wholesale for modern music.

== Selected discography ==
- 5-11-10 (catalog no.) Recorded September 11, 1935 Dick Messner and His Orchestra
1. "The Oregon Trail" Matrix: 18066=1
2. "Wouldn't I Be A Wonder" Matrix: 18071=1

Control no.: E890?
Melotone
Conqueror
Cross reference: CQ8570

- 5-11-11 (catalog no.) Recorded September 11, 1935 Dick Messner and His Orchestra
1. "Now You've Got Me Doing It Johnny Burke (words), Harold Spina (music), Irene Collins (vocalist) Matrix: 18071
2. "Rhythm and Romance" George A. Whiting (words) Nat Schwartz (pseudonym Nat Burton; 1901–1945) (words) J.C. Johnson (music) Irene Collins (vocalist) Matrix: 18068

Melotone
Conqueror
Cross reference: CQ8607

- 5-12-02 (catalog number) Recorded September 11, 1935 Dick Messner and His Orchestra
1. "I Live For Love" Matrix: 18067
2. "Mine Alone" Matrix: 18069

Melotone
Conqueror

- 5-12-09 (catalog no.) Recorded October 14, 1935 Dick Messner and His Orchestra
1. "On Treasure Island" Edgar Leslie (words) Joe Burke (music) Peter Schipper (vocals) Matrix: 18166=1 Xref: CQ8571
2. "When The Leaves Bid The Trees Goodbye" Tot Seymour (pseudonym of Grace Mann; 1889–1966) (words) Vee Lawnhurst (pseudonym of Laura Lowenherz; 1905–1992) (music) Matrix: 18164=1 Xref: CQ8606

Melotone
Conqueror

- 6-01-07 (catalog no.) Recorded October 14, 1935 Dick Messner and His Orchestra
1. "In Your Own Innocent Way" Harold Newell Raymond (1884–1957) (w&m) Nat Simon (w&m) Sammy Mysels (1906–1974) (w&m) Irene Collins (vocalist) Matrix: 18163
2. "You Stayed Away Too Long" George A. Whiting (words) Nat Schwartz (pseudonym Nat Burton; 1901–1945) (words) J. C. Johnson (music) Johnny Messner (vocalist) Matrix: 18165=1 Xref: CQ8614

Melotone
Conqueror
