= Conqueror Records =

American record label

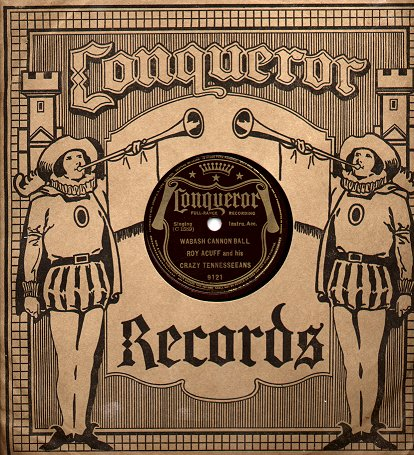
- Conqueror Record in original paper sleeve
- Founded: 1928; 97 years ago
- Defunct: 1942; 83 years ago
- Status: Inactive
- Distributor(s): Sears, Roebuck and Company
- Genre: Various
- Country of origin: United States

Conqueror Records was a United States–based record label, active from 1928 through 1942. The label was sold exclusively through Sears, Roebuck and Company.

== History ==
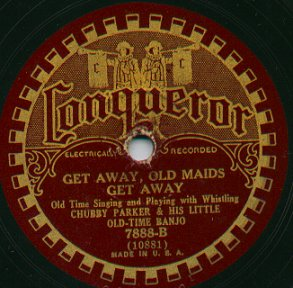
Label of Conqueror Record

Conqueror was originally owned by the Plaza Music Company, then became part of the American Record Corporation family of labels. Most of the issues are of standard dance tunes and popular songs of the era, although there are jazz recordings by Louis Armstrong and Glenn Miller.

The audio fidelity of Conquerors is average for the era, pressed into somewhat below average shellac. The record sleeves state that the proper playing speed for Conqueror Records is 80 rpm.

== Selected artists ==
- Dick Messner
- Harry James
- Bing Crosby
- Fletcher Henderson
- Jack Pettis (de)
- Lizzie Miles
- Sam Lanin
- Devine's Wisconsin Roof Orchestra
- Fred Hall
- Ernie Golden
- Ted Wallace and his Orchestra
- Horsey's Hot Five
- Irving Mills
- Hal Kemp
- Fred Rich
- Duke Ellington
- Adrian Schubert
- Chick Bullock
- Ben Pollack
- Jack Teagarden
- Varsity Eight
- Cab Calloway
- Red Nichols
- The Carter Family
- Beale Street Washboard Band (see Herb Morand)
- ARC Studio Bands
- Gene Kardos
- Joe Haymes
- Dick Robertson
- The Radio Imps
- Murray and Scanlan

== See also ==
- Embassy Records: Woolworth's store brand record label
- Oriole Records (U.S.): McCrory's store brand record label
- List of record labels
