= Hatch Rosdahl =

American football player (1941–2004)

No. 83, 76
- Position: Defensive lineman

Personal information
- Born: August 24, 1941; Hackensack, New Jersey, U.S.
- Died: June 15, 2004 (aged 62); Ridgefield Park, New Jersey, U.S.
- Listed height: 6 ft 5 in (1.96 m)
- Listed weight: 250 lb (113 kg)

Career information
- High school: Ridgefield Park
- College: Penn State (1960–1963)
- NFL draft: 1963: 4th round, 46th overall pick
- AFL draft: 1963: 14th round, 107th overall pick

Career history
- Buffalo Bills (1964); Kansas City Chiefs (1964–1966); Waterbury Orbits (1967); New York Jets (1968)*
- * Offseason or practice squad member only

Awards and highlights
- AFL champion (1966); First-team All-East (1962)

Career AFL statistics
- Sacks: 1
- Stats at Pro Football Reference

Harrison Lynn Rosdahl (August 24, 1941 – June 15, 2004) was an American professional football defensive lineman who played three seasons in the American Football League (AFL) with the Buffalo Bills and Kansas City Chiefs. Rosdahl played college football at Penn State University. He was a member of the Chiefs team that won the 1966 AFL championship.

== Early life and college ==
Harrison Lynn Rosdahl was born on August 24, 1941, in Hackensack, New Jersey. He attended Ridgefield Park High School in Ridgefield Park, New Jersey.

Rosdahl was a member of the Penn State Nittany Lions from 1960 to 1963 and a three-year letterman from 1961 to 1963. He was named first-team All-East by both the Associated Press and United Press International in 1962.

== Professional career ==
In December 1962, Rosdahl was selected by the San Francisco 49ers in the fourth round, with the 46th overall pick, of the 1963 NFL draft and by the San Diego Chargers in the 14th round, with the 107th overall pick, of the 1963 AFL draft.

On January 30, 1963, his AFL rights were traded to the Buffalo Bills. He did not sign with the Bills until February 5, 1964. Rosdahl played in four games for the Bills during the 1964 AFL season before being waived on October 8, 1964.

Rosdahl was then claimed off waivers by the AFL's Kansas City Chiefs. He played in seven games, starting two, for the Chiefs during the 1964 season and recorded one sack. He appeared in all 14 games in 1965. He played in seven games for the Chiefs in 1966. On January 1, 1967, the Chiefs beat Rosdahl's former team, the Bills, in the 1966 American Football League Championship Game by a score of 31–7. The Chiefs then advanced to Super Bowl I, where they lost to the Green Bay Packers. Rosdahl was released by the Chiefs in 1967.

Rosdahl played in one game for the Waterbury Orbits of the Atlantic Coast Football League in 1967.

He signed with the New York Jets of the AFL in 1968 but was later released.

== Death ==
Rosdahl died at the age of 62 on June 15, 2004, of a fall suffered at his home in Ridgefield Park.
