= Gregory Olsen =

American engineer and scientist (born 1945)

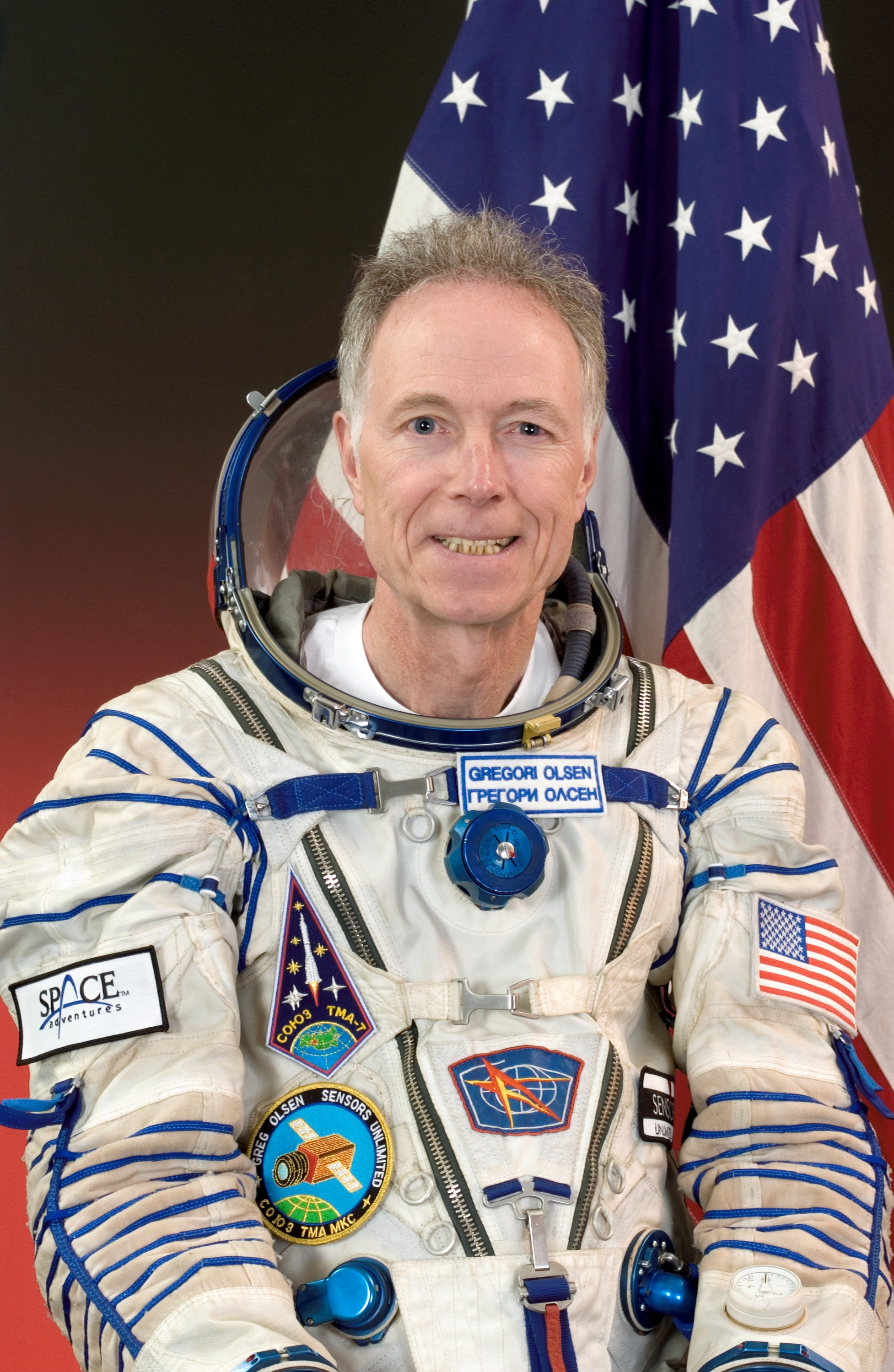
- Born: April 20, 1945 (age 81); Brooklyn, New York, U.S.
- Education: Fairleigh Dickinson University (B.S., B.Eng, M.S.); University of Virginia (Ph.D.)
- Occupation: Entrepreneur
- Space career

Space Adventures Tourist
- Time in space: 9d 21h 15m
- Missions: Soyuz TMA-7 / Soyuz TMA-6
- Scientific career
- Fields: Material science
- Thesis: The fcc-bcc transformation in thin iron films. (1970)
- Doctoral advisor: William A. Jesser

Gregory Hammond Olsen (born April 20, 1945) is an American entrepreneur, engineer and scientist who, in October 2005, became the third private citizen to make a self-funded trip to the International Space Station with the company Space Adventures.

Olsen was the co-founder and chairman of Sensors Unlimited Inc., a company developing optoelectronic devices such as sensitive near-infrared (NIR) and shortwave-infrared (SWIR) cameras. One of Sensors Unlimited's major customers is NASA. Currently, Olsen is President of GHO Ventures, LLC, in Princeton, New Jersey, where he manages his angel investments, South African winery, Montana ranch, Manhattan and Miami real estate, and performs numerous speaking engagements to encourage children – especially minority and female children – to consider careers in science or engineering. He also is a physics professor at Rider University.

== Early life and education ==
Olsen, born in Brooklyn, New York, was the son of an IBEW Local 3 electrician. His mother was a school teacher. He grew up in Bay Ridge and graduated from Ridgefield Park High School, Ridgefield Park, New Jersey in 1962. Olsen initially wanted to be a baseball player but realised from local little league how tough the standard was. Olsen was inspired by his father to become an electrician, always having the education at home to fix things in-house instead of calling a repairman.

After being written off as a failure by teachers due to poor grades in high school, Olsen planned to join the United States Army until he was counseled to try college for several months. Through an IBEW Local 3 scholarship, Olsen attempted college, kept his grades high, and graduated magna cum laude with multiple degrees from Fairleigh Dickinson University. He later graduated with a PhD in materials science from the University of Virginia. He has two daughters, Kimberly and Krista, and six grandchildren: Justin Dibsie, Carter Dibsie, Danielle Dibsie, Romina Lapadula, Athina Lapadula, and Oriana Lapadula.

== Business career ==
Olsen admits to little business training and believes that for companies making less than 100 million (the smaller companies as he calls them) that success is based more on “intuition, instinct and hard work.” He does credit his success to his graduate science training. “Two of my start-up companies are from the fields I trained in. For instance, my first company EPITAXX (a supplier of optical detectors and receivers for fiber optic telecommunications and cable television networks) relied on my knowledge of physics and material science.” Olsen likes to put his money into high-risk start-ups. Olsen founded EPITAXX, a fiberoptic detector manufacturer in 1984 together with Vladimir Ban. It was sold in 1990 for $12 million. He then co-founded Sensors Unlimited in 1992 with Dr. Marshall J. Cohen. Sensors Unlimited was sold to Finisar Corp for around $700 million USD in 2000. It was then repurchased by the management team in 2002 for $6 million, and sold once more to Goodrich, Corp. in 2005 for $60 million. After a space mission on the Soyuz TMA-6 for 10 days, he landed on earth on October 11, 2005. After this, he went back to his businessman lifestyle and founded GHO Ventures, LLC, where he is still leading today as president.

== Spaceflight details ==
Having flown to the International Space Station (ISS) with Soyuz TMA-7 (launched October 1, 2005, docked October 3) and landed with Soyuz TMA-6 (October 10), Olsen is the third self-funded space tourist to visit the ISS, following Dennis Tito (2001) and Mark Shuttleworth (2002) (all three space tourists flew through Space Adventures, Ltd.). As of 2013, Soyuz TMA-6 is on display at the Intrepid Museum’s Space Shuttle Pavilion. Olsen has made some comments indicating that he is unhappy with the "space tourist" designation. The following is from National Geographic's coverage "Space Launch – Along for the Ride (2007)": "Greg: The term space tourist implies that you'll write a check and you go for a joyride. And believe me that is not the case at all. Narrator: Greg worked hard to get this far, training for two years with the Russian Space Agency."

Olsen went in to great detail about his flight in an interview with Paul Stenning. He revealed he had to train for a year and a half before being ready to go into space. During a routine x-ray, a black spot was found on his lung. He had to have a monthly medical check to obtain permission to fly. It took 9 months for him to pass the medical.

He conducted several experiments in remote sensing and astronomy while aboard the space station. Dr. Olsen is a licensed amateur radio operator holding FCC callsign KC2ONX and spoke to students via ham radio from space through the ARISS project. In an informal presentation at a New Jersey high school, Dr. Olsen estimated the price of his space excursion at US$20 million.

== Awards and honors ==
Olsen was elected a member of the National Academy of Engineering in 2010 for research and commercialization of optical components for fiber communications and national defense.

Olsen was elected a member of the Fairleigh Dickinson University Board of Trustees.

== See also ==
- List of space travelers by name

== Sources ==
1. Olsen's presentation at Hopewell Valley Regional High School, Pennington, New Jersey, United States on 26 April 2006.
2. Olsen's presentation at Montgomery Township High School, Skillman, New Jersey, United States on 20 May 2006
3. Olsen's presentation at Bear Tavern Elementary school Hopewell Valley Regional school, Titusville New Jersey, USA on 26 November 2008
