= Winant Avenue Bridge =

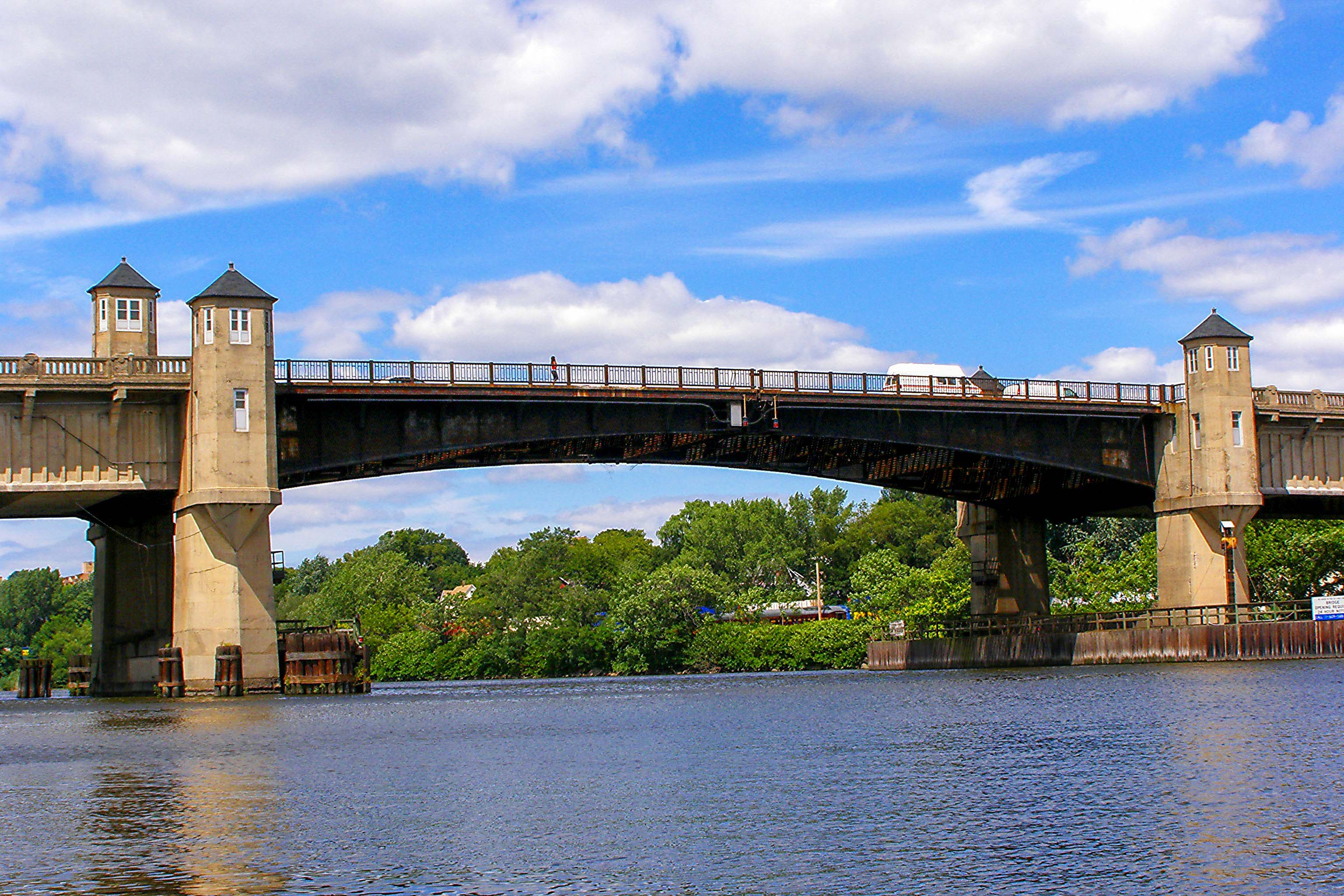
- Coordinates: 40.8511°N 74.0293°W
- Carries: US 46
- Crosses: Hackensack River; NYSW
- Locale: Little Ferry and Ridgefield Park
- Other name(s): Route 46 Hackensack River Bridge; S46 Bridge
- Owner: NJDOT

Characteristics
- Design: Double leaf bascule
- Total length: 1,549 ft (472 m)
- Width: 66 ft (20 m)
- Longest span: 185 ft (56 m)
- No. of spans: 17

History
- Designer: Waddell and Hardesty
- Constructed by: Rodgers and Haggarty
- Opened: 1934

Location
- Interactive map of Winant Avenue Bridge

The Winant Avenue Bridge is a vehicular movable bridge spanning the Hackensack River in Bergen County, New Jersey 14 miles (23 km) from its mouth at Newark Bay. Built in 1934, it is also known as the Route 46 Hackensack River Bridge and S46 Bridge, it carries U.S. Route 46 (US 46) in Little Ferry and Ridgefield Park. Owned and operated by the New Jersey Department of Transportation (NJDOT), the double leaf bascule bridge is located on a navigable reach. While there have been no requests since 1978, the Code of Federal Regulations last amended in 1999 requires 24-hour notice to be opened. The bridge has been minimally altered since its construction and is eligible for individual listing on the National Register of Historic Places (NRHP).

== Background ==
The bridge is located at a crossing established by the pre-colonial Hackensack tribe. As its name suggests, Liitle Ferry had been the site of a ferry crossing since the colonial era, with a rope-towed boat operating between 1659 and 1826. The first bridge was built in 1812. The Bergen Turnpike was an important road between nearby Hackensack and the Hudson Waterfront at Hoboken. Ferry service was augmented with rail service in the early 1890s by the New York, Susquehanna and Western Railway (NYSW), the tracks of which pass under the S46. Soon after the predecessor to the Public Service began trolley service. A vehicular crossing was created in 1934 with the construction of the road that would become Route 46. The bridge was constructed as part of the expansion of the state highway system in the 1920s and 1930 to carry State Highway Route 6. At its western end, the Little Ferry Circle was built in 1933 in conjunction with bridge.

== Design and historical significance ==
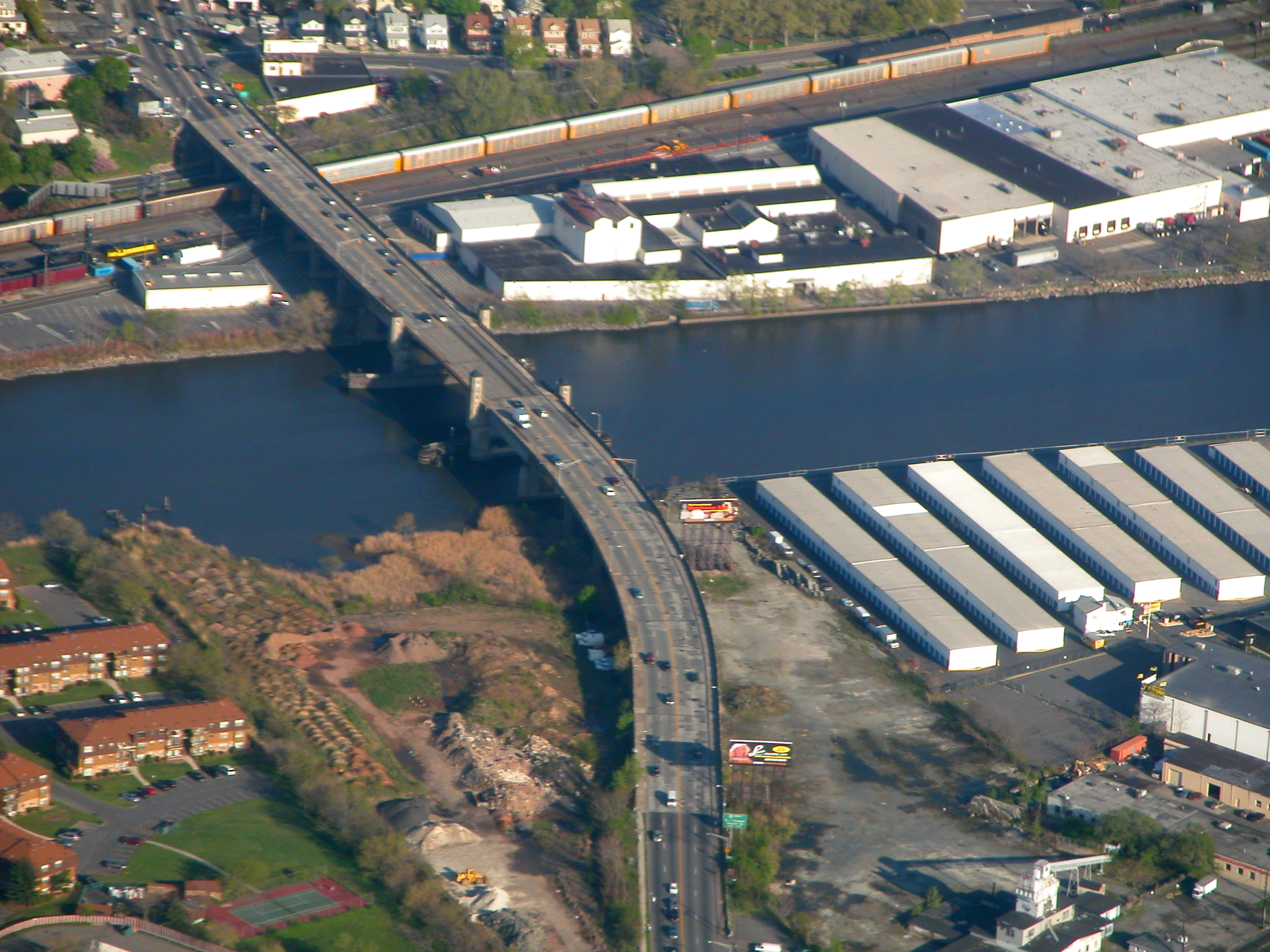

Designed by Waddell and Hardesty Consulting Engineers, the double-leaf bascule deck girder bridge was built by the New Jersey Highway Department, the predecessor to NJDOT. John Alexander Low Waddell, a partner in the firm was also involved with other bridges in the region, including the now defunct CRRNJ Newark Bay Bridge. It carries two lanes of traffic in each direction, with sidewalks, but no shoulders. It has a concrete substructure and sixteen approach spans. Four octagonal concrete towers are located at the corners of the bascule span; two are gate tenders’ houses, one contains houses operating mechanisms, and one is used for storage. A NJDOT survey in 2001 found the S46 to be "technologically distinguished, historically significant, and well-preserved example of an increasingly rare bridge type," While the State Historic Preservation Office and the New Jersey Register of Historic Places (ID#2962) identified the historic significance of the structure known as US Route 46 Bascule Bridge in 1997 it is not listed on the NRHP.

== Rehabilitation ==
Route 46 enters Bergen County at the Passaic River and after converging with several other roads ends midppint of the GWB over the Hudson River

Once an important commercial waterway within the Port of New York and New Jersey, the Hackensack River is tidally influenced and channelized to its middle reaches and considered partially navigable for commercial marine traffic. Route 46 is a major thoroughfare across northern New Jersey, ending at the midpoint of the George Washington Bridge (GWB). Traffic on the Hackensack River Bridge and in its vicinity has long been reputed to be precarious, with regular requests for guard rails to be installed. In 2009, the NJDOT announced a $21 million rehabilitation project. The repairs will address structural deficiencies and are expected to extend the useful life of the bridge by ten years, though it will remain "functionally obsolete' since the roadway has no shoulders. They will not diminish its function as a movable bridge or the historic status of the structure. While funding for the project has been identified as of December 2011 work had not begun, though that at Little Ferry Circle was underway. Work is scheduled to begin in Fall 2013. Construction on the bridge began in June 2014 and was expected to take 18 months. The $33.8 million project will rehabilitate a bridge deemed structurally deficient, turn the Little Ferry Circle into a conventional four-way intersection and install a new drainage system and pump station to reduce flooding in the area.

== See also ==
- Route 46 Passaic River Bridge
- List of crossings of the Hackensack River
- List of crossings of the Lower Passaic River
