= Johnny Messner (musician) =

Musical artist (1909–1986)

- Birth name: John C. Messner
- Born: October 13, 1909 Manhattan, New York, U.S.
- Died: January 1, 1986 (aged 76)
- Genres: Big band, traditional Pop

Johnny Messner (13 October 1909, in New York City – January 1986, in Ridgefield Park, New Jersey) was an American bandleader, composer, saxophonist, and vocalist during the big band/swing heyday.

== Background ==
Messner grew up in Ridgefield Park, New Jersey and graduated from Ridgefield Park High School in 1928. Messner received a scholarship to study at the Juilliard School of Music. During World War II he was drafted into the US Army, where he served as bandleader for ensembles at military training facilities across the United States. After the war ended, he joined Vincent Lopez's orchestra as an assistant bandleader and saxophonist.

== Family ==
Messner was the youngest of five male siblings. An older brother, Dick Messner, was also a musician and bandleader. All five brothers performed together in Johnny's orchestra: Dick (piano), Johnny (violin and clarinet), Charlie (né Charles Messner; 1905–2003) (woodwinds), Bill (né William Messner; 1904–1982) (drums), Fred (né Frederick Messner; born 1902) (violin). The Five Brothers made their radio broadcast debut in 1923 on NBC, then known as WJZ.
