= Ridgefield Park Public Schools =

School district in Bergen County, New Jersey, US

Address
- 712 Lincoln Avenue Ridgefield Park, Bergen County, New Jersey, 07660; United States
- Coordinates: 40.86174°N 74.025739°W

District information
- Grades: PreK-12
- Superintendent: Angela Bender
- Business administrator: Carrie Grapstein
- Schools: 4

Students and staff
- Enrollment: 2,178 (as of 2020–21)
- Faculty: 180.0 FTEs
- Student–teacher ratio: 12.1:1

Other information
- District Factor Group: DE
- Website: www.rpps.net
Ind.	Per pupil	District spending	Rank (*)	K-12 average	%± vs. average
1A	Total Spending	$16,613	19	$18,891	−12.1%
1	Budgetary Cost	12,055	7	14,783	−18.5%
2	Classroom Instruction	7,360	14	8,763	−16.0%
6	Support Services	1,908	20	2,392	−20.2%
8	Administrative Cost	1,271	9	1,485	−14.4%
10	Operations & Maintenance	1,085	2	1,783	−39.1%
13	Extracurricular Activities	411	44	268	53.4%
16	Median Teacher Salary	68,466	52	64,043
Data from NJDoE 2014 Taxpayers' Guide to Education Spending. *Of K-12 districts with 1,800-3,500 students. Lowest spending=1; Highest=68

The Ridgefield Park Public Schools is a comprehensive community public school district that serves students in pre-kindergarten through twelfth grade from the Village of Ridgefield Park, in Bergen County, in the U.S. state of New Jersey.

As of the 2020–21 school year, the district, comprised of four schools, had an enrollment of 2,178 students and 180.0 classroom teachers (on an FTE basis), for a student–teacher ratio of 12.1:1.

The district is classified by the New Jersey Department of Education as being in District Factor Group "DE", the fifth-highest of eight groupings. District Factor Groups organize districts statewide to allow comparison by common socioeconomic characteristics of the local districts. From lowest socioeconomic status to highest, the categories are A, B, CD, DE, FG, GH, I and J.

Students from Little Ferry attend the high school as part of a sending/receiving relationship with the Little Ferry Public Schools that has been in place since 1953.

== Awards and recognition ==
Grant School was recognized by the United States Department of Education's National Blue Ribbon Schools Program for the 2009-10 school year, "the most prestigious designation in education". While 49% of students had failed the Elementary School Proficiency Assessment in 2001, by 2010 all of the school's students were deemed proficient by the New Jersey Assessment of Skills and Knowledge (NJASK). The school was one of 10 in New Jersey to be recognized that year.

For the 2005-06 school year, Ridgefield Park High School was one of 22 schools statewide selected as Governor's School of Excellence Winners, an award given to schools that have demonstrated significant academic improvement over the previous two academic years.

== Schools ==
Schools in the district (with 2020–21 enrollment data from the National Center for Education Statistics) are:

Elementary schools

- Grant Elementary School with 244 students in grades K-6
  - Natasha Hernandez, Principal
- Lincoln Elementary School with 374 students in grades PreK-6
  - Stephen Ferraro, Principal
- Roosevelt Elementary School with 339 students in grades PreK-6
  - Jason Cata, Principal

High school

- Ridgefield Park High School with 1,189 students in grades 7-12
  - Melissa M. Cavins, Principal (9-12)
  - Dyan Thiemann, Principal (7-8)

== Administration ==
Core members of the district's administration are:

- Angela Bender, superintendent of schools
- Carrie Grapstein, business administrator and board secretary

== Board of education ==
The district's board of education is comprised of nine members who set policy and oversee the fiscal and educational operation of the district through its administration. As a Type II school district, the board's trustees are elected directly by voters to serve three-year terms of office on a staggered basis, with three seats up for election each year held (since 2012) as part of the November general election. The board appoints a superintendent to oversee the district's day-to-day operations and a business administrator to supervise the business functions of the district. A representative from Little Ferry serves on the board of education.
