= Overpeck Township, New Jersey =

Township that existed in Bergen County, New Jersey from 1897 to 1938

Coordinates: 40.854722°N 74.020278°W

Overpeck Township was a township that existed in Bergen County, New Jersey, United States, from 1897 to 1938.

The township was incorporated by an Act of the New Jersey Legislature on March 23, 1897, and was formed coextensively with Ridgefield Park from portions of Ridgefield Township.

On May 3, 1921, Overpeck Township acquired portions of both Bogota and Teaneck. On June 1, 1926, additional territories were acquired from Teaneck.

On May 31, 1938, Overpeck Township was renamed to Ridgefield Park Township. With the creation of Ridgefield Park Township, Overpeck Township was dissolved.

== Sources ==
- "History of Bergen County, New Jersey, 1630-1923;" by "Westervelt, Frances A. (Frances Augusta), 1858-1942."
- "Municipal Incorporations of the State of New Jersey (according to Counties)" prepared by the Division of Local Government, Department of the Treasury (New Jersey); December 1, 1958.
