= Starr Piano Company =

American piano manufacturer

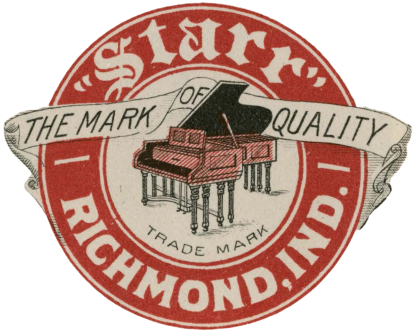

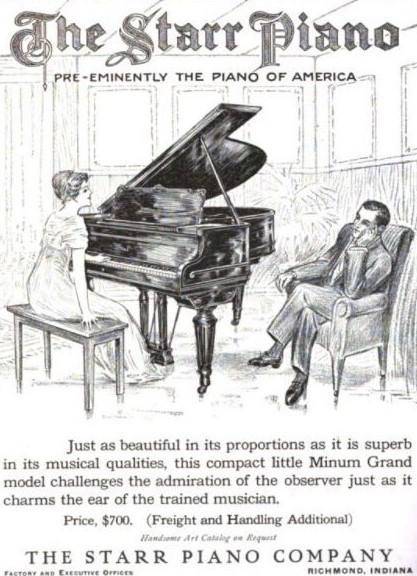
- Type: Private Company
- Industry: Piano Manufacturer
- Predecessor: James M. Starr & Company
- Founded: 1872
- Founder: James Starr
- Defunct: 1952
- Fate: Purchased by J. Solotken Co.
- Headquarters: Richmond, Indiana
- Area served: United States
- Key people: Gennett Family
- Products: Pianos, Phonographs, Records

The Starr Piano Company was an American manufacturer of pianos from the late 1800s to the middle 1900s. Founded by James Starr, the company also made phonographs and records and was the parent company of the jazz label Gennett. The company is known for manufacturing pianos under the brand names of Starr, Trayser, Duchess, Richmond, Remington, and Royal.

== History ==
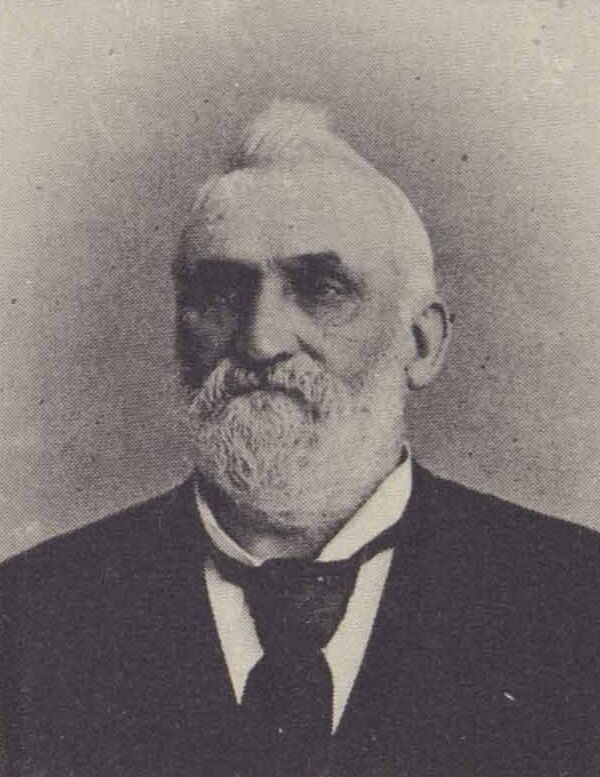
Starr in an 1893 publication

George Trayser and Milo J. Chase started the Trayser Piano Forte Company in a building near the Ohio River in Ripley, Ohio, with Chase as the president and manager. In 1872, the company moved to Richmond, Indiana, after receiving financial help from James Starr and Richard Jackson, both residents of Richmond. When Trayser retired six years later, the company was renamed Chase Piano Company, Starr became president and Jackson secretary-treasurer. In the 1880s Chase moved to Grand Rapids, Michigan, to establish his own piano factory, leaving the Richmond operation to be renamed James Starr and Company, with James Starr as president and his brother Benjamin the manager.

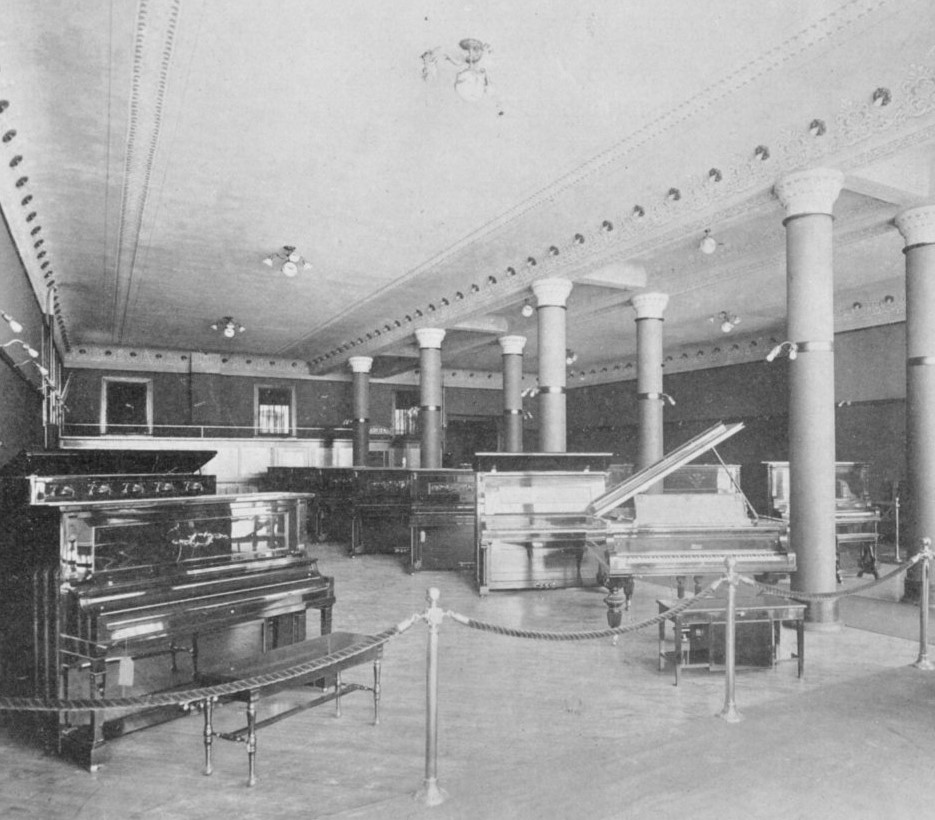
Starr Showroom, Richmond, Indiana, 1906

One of the retailers that sold Starr pianos was the Jesse French Piano & Organ Company in St. Louis. Two employees of that company, John Lumsden and his son-in-law Henry Gennett, pursued a merger with Starr in 1892 which took place during the following year. Lumsden and Gennett owned half the company after that. After Lumsden died and James Starr retired, Gennett became president. By 1900, control of the company had passed from the Starr family to the Gennett: Henry (president) and his sons Harry (vice president), Clarence (treasurer), and Fred (secretary).

In the 1890s, pianos were so popular in America that one hundred companies were making them. Between 1893 and 1949 Starr produced nearly a dozen brands, including Trayser, Duchess, Richmond, Remington, and Royal, and bought other piano companies like Krell in 1927. In 1915, 250 companies were making pianos, 75 percent from 25 companies that including Starr, Baldwin, and Wurlitzer. For its craftsmanship, Starr won awards at the Chicago's World Fair (1893), St. Louis World's Fair (1904), Tennessee Centennial Exposition (1907), Alaska–Yukon–Pacific Exposition (1909), and the Panama–Pacific International Exposition (1915). Starr sold fifty styles that included a baby grand piano (the Minum), a four-foot tall model designed for apartments (the Princess), and player pianos.

By 1904, Starr had showrooms in Dayton, Piqua, Toledo, and Cleveland, Ohio. By 1915, Starr had retail stores in major cities such Detroit, Michigan; Chicago, Illinois; and San Diego and Los Angeles, California while Jesse French chain stores carried Starr pianos in their South and Southwest stores. The company had a showroom inside the Nashville Jesse French Piano Building at 240–242 Fifth Street North. An Indianapolis store was located at 138 and 140 Pennsylvania Street in the heart of Indy's piano district. The store carried Starr, Richmond and Remington pianos and retailed Knabe pianos and Cecillian self-player's manufactured by the Farrand Organ Company of Detroit. On December 27, 1920, the Indianapolis retail store moved to 49-53 Monument Circle next to the Hilbert Circle Theatre and the Soldiers' and Sailors' Monument.

== Phonographs and records ==
When the major phonograph patents started expiring on the disc phonographs in the mid-1910s, American businesses saw this as an opportunity to invest in a rapidly growing market. Joining with other piano makers making phonographs like Kimball and Aeolian, Starr introduced their own line of phonographs in late 1915. The Starr phonograph had a slight success at first for a minor brand, due in part to winning an award at the 1915 Panama–California Exposition. The Gennett brothers toyed with the idea of getting into the record industry, purchasing the masters to the defunct Phono-Cut Record Company. In late 1914 or early 1915, Starr began issuing records pressed from Phono-Cut masters, under a label named Remington. Although the records failed to sell well commercially, it justified Starr to beef up its record production and build their own recording studio. In 1916 Starr began selling vertical cut records alongside their phonographs called Starr Records. (Due to the Victor and Columbia patents still in effect on the lateral recording method, other companies were forced to make vertical cut records, including Paramount, Okeh, and Vocalion.) Wanting to sell their records outside Starr piano dealers, the Gennetts felt the label was too closely tied to the Starr name. Beginning in late 1917, into early 1918, the label's name was changed to Gennett to allow non-Starr piano dealers to sell their records.

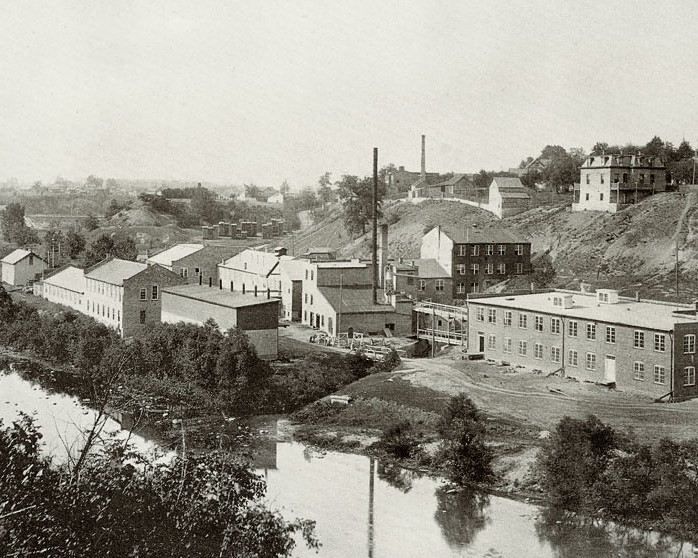
Starr Piano factory 1893

By 1919, the Victor patents on lateral recording were starting to expire, with the remaining patent held in question. Starr, alongside the General Phonograph Corporation, challenged Victor's patent in court. The judge agreed that Victor was using the patent before Eldridge Johnson filed it, and had the patent invalidated. With the patent invalidation going into full effect in 1921, nearly all record makers abandoned vertical cut records, with the exception of Edison and Pathé. Through the early 1920s, Gennett's new lateral cut records became a popular jazz label, recording artists such as Jelly Roll Morton, Bix Beiderbecke, New Orleans Rhythm Kings, and King Oliver's band, including some of Louis Armstrong earliest commercial recordings. At the height of the Starr's manufacturing, they made 25,000 pianos, 15,000 phonographs, and over 4 million records annually. Through the mid-1920s, Starr introduced their own line of electrical recorded records and Isosonic phonographs to compete against Victor's line of Orthophonic Victrolas. However, their early electrically recorded records were plagued with problems, hurting sales. Though they were able to improve the processes quickly, the damage was done, and sales dropped through the late 1920s.

By 1929 the Great Depression impacted the record industry greatly. Starr canceled their phonograph line that year and the Gennett label the following but kept some of the budget labels through the early 1930s. The remaining Starr record pressing building was leased to Decca Records and later Mercury Records (along with some smaller labels) before being auctioned off in the 1970s.

== Closure ==
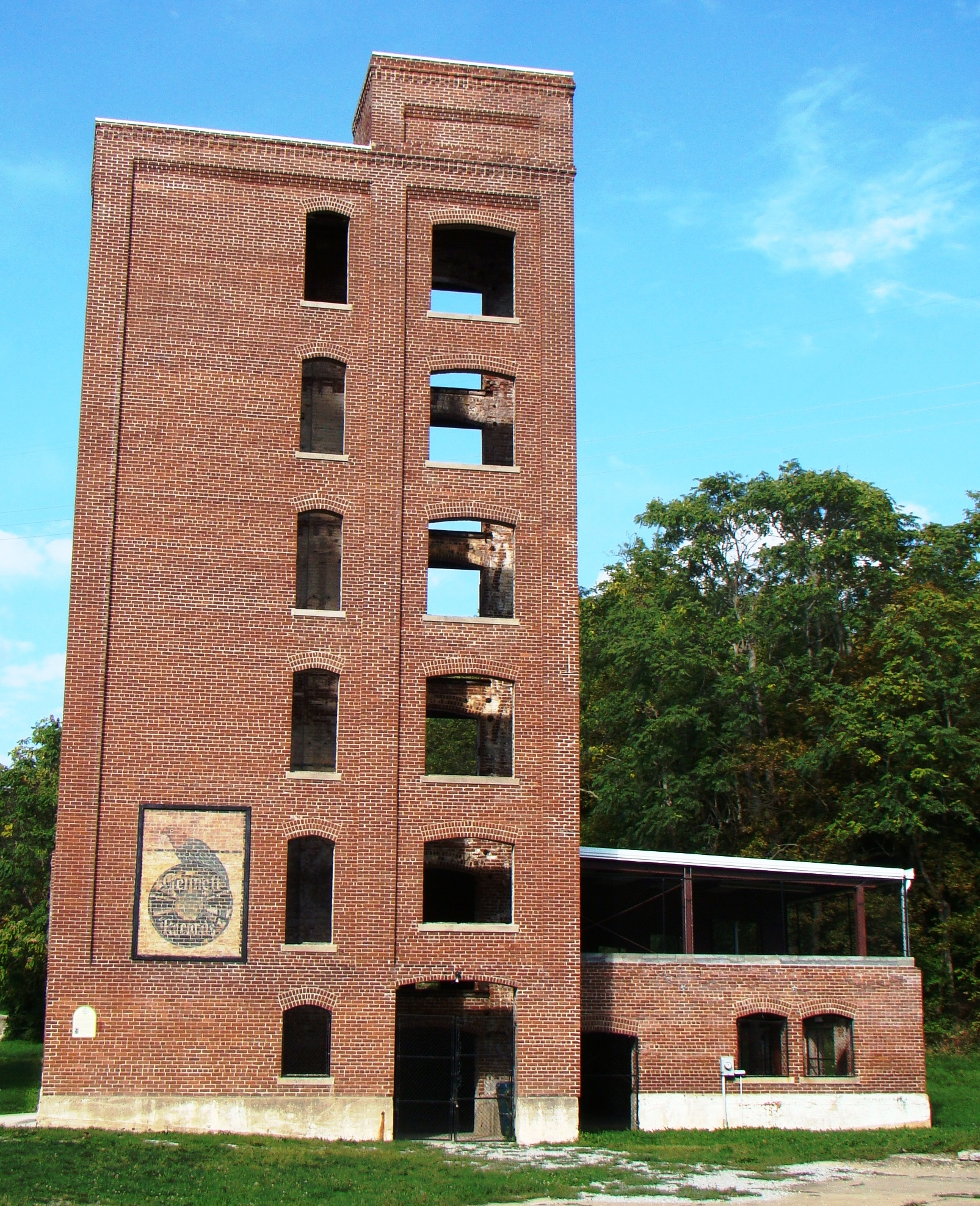
The remains of the Starr factory

With the stock market crash, Starr was only one of a handful of independent piano makers that wasn't absorbed into the massive Aeolian-American Corporation. The company was able to survive the beginning of the Depression in part by transition into a general manufacturer, making radio cabinets and refrigerator parts alongside their pianos. By 1935 Starr declared bankruptcy. Though they reincorporated as a smaller company soon after, they weren't able to build themselves back up.

The company went into serious decline after the 1940s. The Gennett family, still having controlling shares, kept the business operating through World War II by manufacturing goods for the war effort. By 1949, Starr's piano production dropped dramatically, with the refrigerator portion of the company breaking off and forming a separate company. Since making refrigerator parts was a serious aspect of keeping Starr afloat, the Gennett family decided to sell Starr along with its assets. In 1952, the Starr name along with its factory was sold to the J. Solotken Company, a scrap metal and paper salvager from Indianapolis. In 1953, the J. Solotken Company auctioned the Starr factory assets, including machinery, office equipment and other company supplies. Most of the buildings except the record pressing building were left abandoned through the 1960s and early 1970s before being sold off.

In 1977 most of the factory was demolished. A conservation effort in the 1980s was able to save part of the building as a historic landmark. Today the Starr Piano Company Warehouse and Administration Building is used as a park and event venue along with the Gennett Walk of Fame, noting some of the famous artists who recorded there.
