= Jim Booker =

- Born: February 1872; Camp Nelson, Jessamine County, Kentucky, United States
- Origin: Jessamine County, Kentucky, United States
- Died: February 5, 1940 (aged 67–68) Lexington, Kentucky, United States
- Genre: Old-time
- Occupation: Fiddler
- Instrument: Fiddle
- Label: Gennett Records

Jim Booker (February 1872 – February 5, 1940) was an African-American hoedown fiddler from Jessamine County, Kentucky. His 1927 recordings with Taylor's Kentucky Boys and The Booker Orchestra are thought to be the first racially integrated recording session in America.

== Biography ==
Jim Booker was born into a musical family in Camp Nelson in Jessamine County, Kentucky. The Booker family had been established in central Kentucky for multiple generations as prominent old-time musicians. Booker, along with his two younger brothers, John and Joe, and the black mandolinist, Robert Steele, performed under the name, 'The Booker Orchestra'. Booker, alongside his brothers and Steele, played fiddle in several recordings produced by Gennett Records in Richmond, Indiana in 1927. Richard Nevins, a 78 rpm record collector and owner of the 78 reissue label, Yazoo Records, has conducted research suggesting that the Booker family were a direct source of repertoire for several later Kentucky fiddle players, including John Masters, Pretzel Broyle, and Clarence Skirvin.

== 1927 Gennett recording sessions ==
=== April ===
By early 1927, Booker had become acquainted with the white Kentuckian entrepreneur, Dennis W. Taylor, who between 1925 and 1931, acted as a scout, manager and booking agent for around one-hundred old-time musicians, mostly from Kentucky. In late April 1927, Taylor brought Booker to Gennett Records in Richmond, Indiana to make several commercial recordings, all alongside white musicians. The resultant instrumental recordings were released by Gennett under the name, 'Taylor's Kentucky Boys'. While these records are believed to be the first commercial 'integrated' records featuring both black and white musicians playing alongside each other, Booker was excluded from promotional photography: Taylor, who could not play any instrument, posed with a fiddle in Booker's place, alongside the white musicians, Marion Underwood (banjo), and Willie Young (guitar). Therefore, the record was marketed as featuring an all-white band.

Booker also played fiddle on several song recordings which were released with 'Marion Underwood & Sam Harris' and 'Aulton Ray' as the named musical artists. Typical of record companies of the era, Gennett additionally released the recordings under contract for several other labels using the following aliases in place of 'Taylor's Kentucky Boys':

- 'The Tennessee Travelers' and 'Allen's Creek Players' for Champion Records
- 'Hill's Virginia Mountaineers' for Silvertone Records and Supertone Records
- 'The Clinch Valley Boys' for Challenge Records

=== August ===
In August, 1927, Taylor brought Booker back to Gennett alongside the other members of The Booker Orchestra for a second series of recordings. They were joined by Marion Underwood and the white Kentuckian fiddler, Doc Roberts. During these sessions, Booker recorded three twin-fiddle tunes with Roberts. His brother, John Booker played guitar. Of the three tunes recorded, two were rejected by Gennett. Of three songs the members of The Booker Orchestra recorded alongside Marion Underwood, one was rejected by Gennett.
