= George Trayser =

German-American piano maker

George L. Trayser
- Born: 1808; Grand Duchy of Hesse
- Died: 1881 (aged 72–73); Richmond, Indiana, U.S.
- Spouse: Henriette Koerner
- Parent(s): Johanna Philipp and Catherine Margaretha Dickerhoff Trayser

Signature
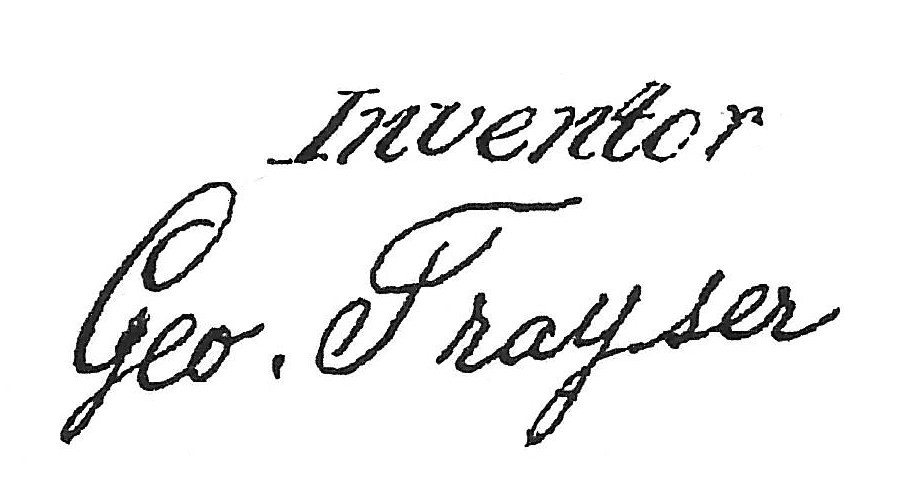

George L. Trayser (1808 – 1881) was a Grand Duchy of Hesse-born American piano maker. He emigrated to the United States in 1849, and made pianos in Ripley, Ohio; Covington, Louisville, and Maysville, Kentucky; and Indianapolis and Richmond, Indiana. His pianos—due to their high quality and rich, resonant tone and responsive action—had a reputation as instruments suitable for school and concert work. Trayser's piano companies were eventually dissolved into the Starr Piano Company.

== Early life (1808–1865) ==
Trayser was born in 1808 in Hesse-Darmstadt, Prussia which later became Darmstadt, Germany. Trayser apprenticed in piano making in German piano factories near Darmstadt. He married in Germany, and two sons were born in Neuchâtel, Switzerland: Frederick L. was born in 1840 and Paul was born in 1842. Trayser owned a piano company in Switzerland.

The family emigrated to the United States in 1849 and settled initially in Newport, Kentucky. Trayser started a small factory in Covington, Kentucky (Traeyser & Co.), and had Morse & Guernsey as consignment agents in Louisville, Kentucky in 1851. Trayser was granted his first patent for an upright piano in Cincinnati in 1853. Trayser traded in and repaired pianos. At some point the spelling of the original family surname of "Traeyser" was changed to "Trayser", likely at the time of naturalization if not earlier.

His younger brother Phillip Trayser, who lived in Baltimore, signed a guarantee for $1,000 in October 1853. Trayser struggled financially and was insolvent 1854–1856. There were lawsuits about his debts until 1862. John A. Skiff was a sales agent for Skiff & Trayser pianos in Cincinnati, Ohio in 1854. In 1857, the Covington, Kentucky factory was destroyed in a fire, and Trayser moved to Louisville, Kentucky.

In 1858, Trayser was a witness in an extensive church dispute in Louisville, Kentucky. It was apparent that customers took advantage of Trayser, especially in written contracts, because Trayser did not yet read English. He was competent to hear and speak English in the trial.

Trayser moved to Indianapolis in 1859. He paid a manufacturing license tax to the state of Indiana in May 1864 in Indianapolis. He also partnered with Col. William J. H. Robinson to form Trayser, Robinson & Co. in 1865.

== Building pianos (1865–1876) ==
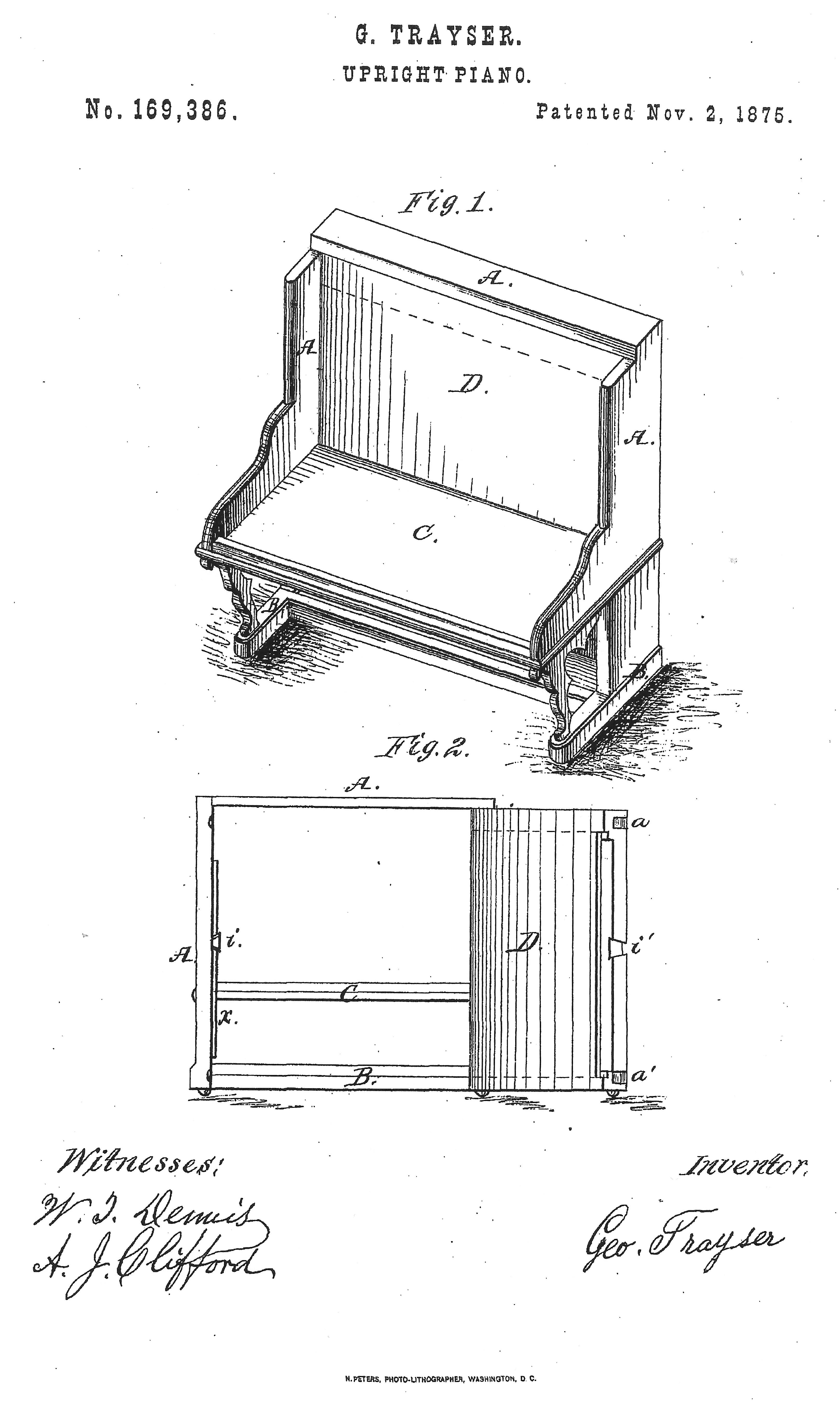
Patent 169386 by Trayser, 1875

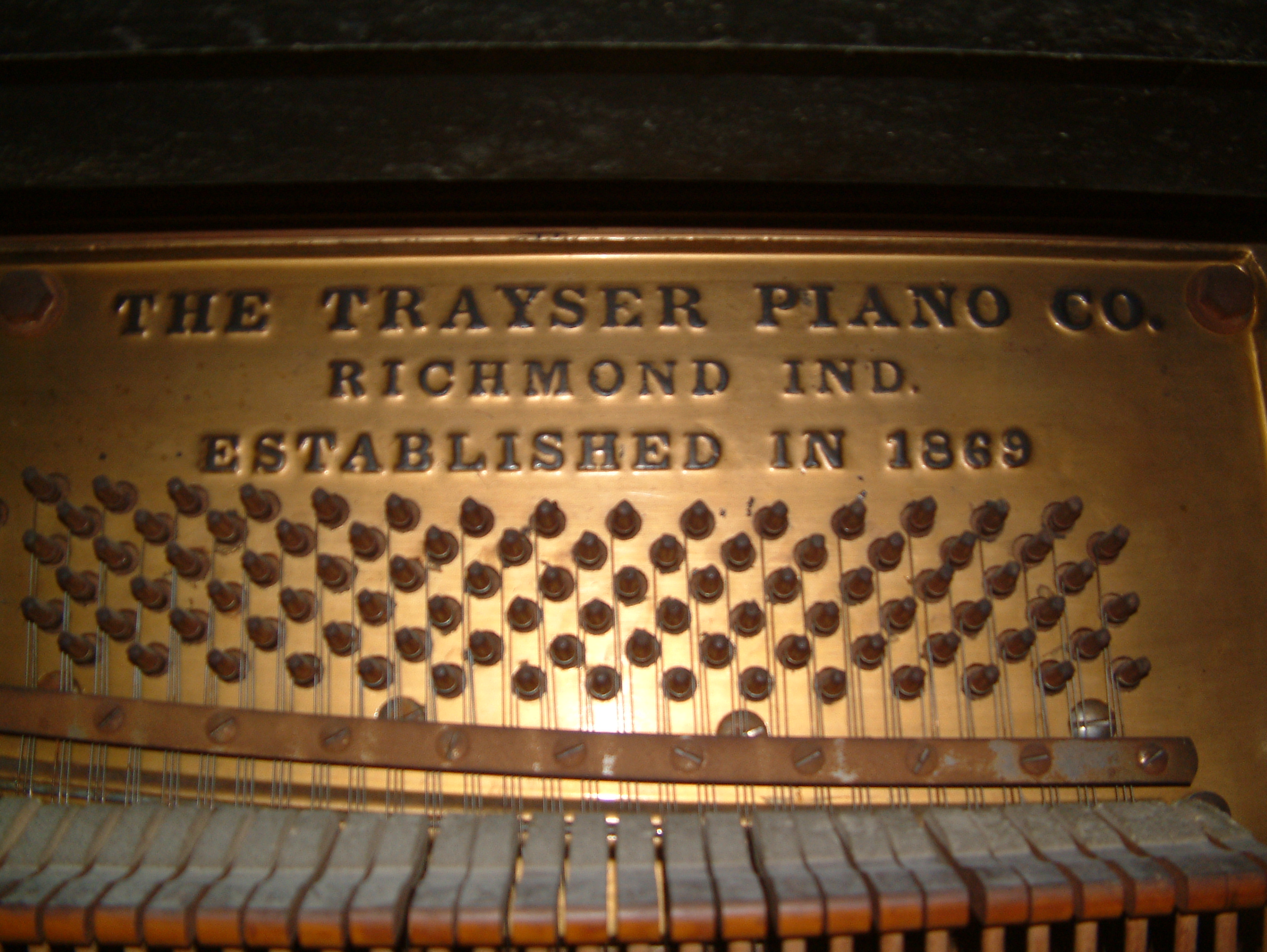
Frame of a Trayser piano

His pianos—due to their high quality and rich, resonant tone and responsive action—had a reputation as instruments suitable for school and concert work.

Trayser moved the family to Maysville, Kentucky, in 1865 and founded the Trayser Piano Forte Co. Milo J. Chase was the President and General Manager, and G. Bambach Jr. was Secretary. George Trayser made and supervised construction of the pianos. Trayser also sold his pianos in Ripley, Ohio until 1871, having moved his family there by 1870.

George L. Trayser became a naturalized US citizen in 1866. Trayser was granted another patent for upright piano in Indianapolis in 1867 and established the "Ohio Valley Piano-Forte Company" and manufactured "Valley Gem" pianos for Cincinnati, Ohio manufacturer D. H. Baldwin. Eventually, Trayser moved his family to Richmond, Indiana except for his son Frederick, who lived most of his life in Maysville, Kentucky. By 1872, Trayser had moved to Richmond, Indiana and began the "Trayser Piano Company."

In 1873 Frederick Trayser was granted a patent for piano action in Maysville. He was listed in the Maysville city directory in 1876. In 1875 George Trayser was granted another piano patent in Richmond. In 1876 the family resided at 43 N. Pearl, while the Trayser Piano Company was at 145 N. 5th. In a blind vote contest in Cincinnati on 10 June 1876, there were 73 votes for Trayser and 43 for Steinway. In a blind vote contest at Lyceum Hall in Richmond on 8 September 1876, the vote was 120 for Trayser and 70 for Steinway.

== Growing the companies (1876–1881) ==
In October 1876 the Trayser Piano Company of Richmond, Indiana had rooms in Lyceum Hall for offices and warerooms, sharing those rooms with Hoosier Organ Co. and Professor Rhu, music teacher. In October 1876 construction began on a new piano factory. It was 80' x 125' and 3.5 stories built in the location of the old woolen mills. In September 1877 the Valley Gem of Ripley, Ohio merged into Trayser Piano Company (including M. J. Chase and 16 workmen). The Trayser Piano Company made the Trayser upright, the Valley Gem Scale and the Chase Square Grand.

November 1877 marked the opening of the Trayser-Chase ware rooms at Main and Pearl in Richmond. George Trayser withdrew from making pianos in 1878 at age 70. In 1878 the family resided at 85 S. 6th, while in 1879 the family resided at 45 N. Washington. His son Paul started the Richmond Piano Company in 1879.

== Successors (1878–1950) ==
In 1878 the Trayser Piano Company was subsumed into the Chase Piano Company in Richmond. In 1884 the Chase Piano Company became the James M Starr & Company and by 1893 all the above companies, including the Richmond Piano Company and excluding the "Ohio Valley Piano Company" which was sold to D.H. Baldwin, merged into the Starr Piano Company. This company continued making pianos in Richmond under the names Starr, Trayser, Duchess, Richmond, Remington, Chase, among many others, until the 1950s.

== Military service ==
Paul Trayser served in the Civil War as a bugler in a Kentucky regiment. An obituary states Paul had been present at the siege of Richmond.

== Death and legacy ==
George Trayser died in 1881 in Richmond, Indiana, at the age of 73. Trayser is best known for making pianos.

== Gallery ==
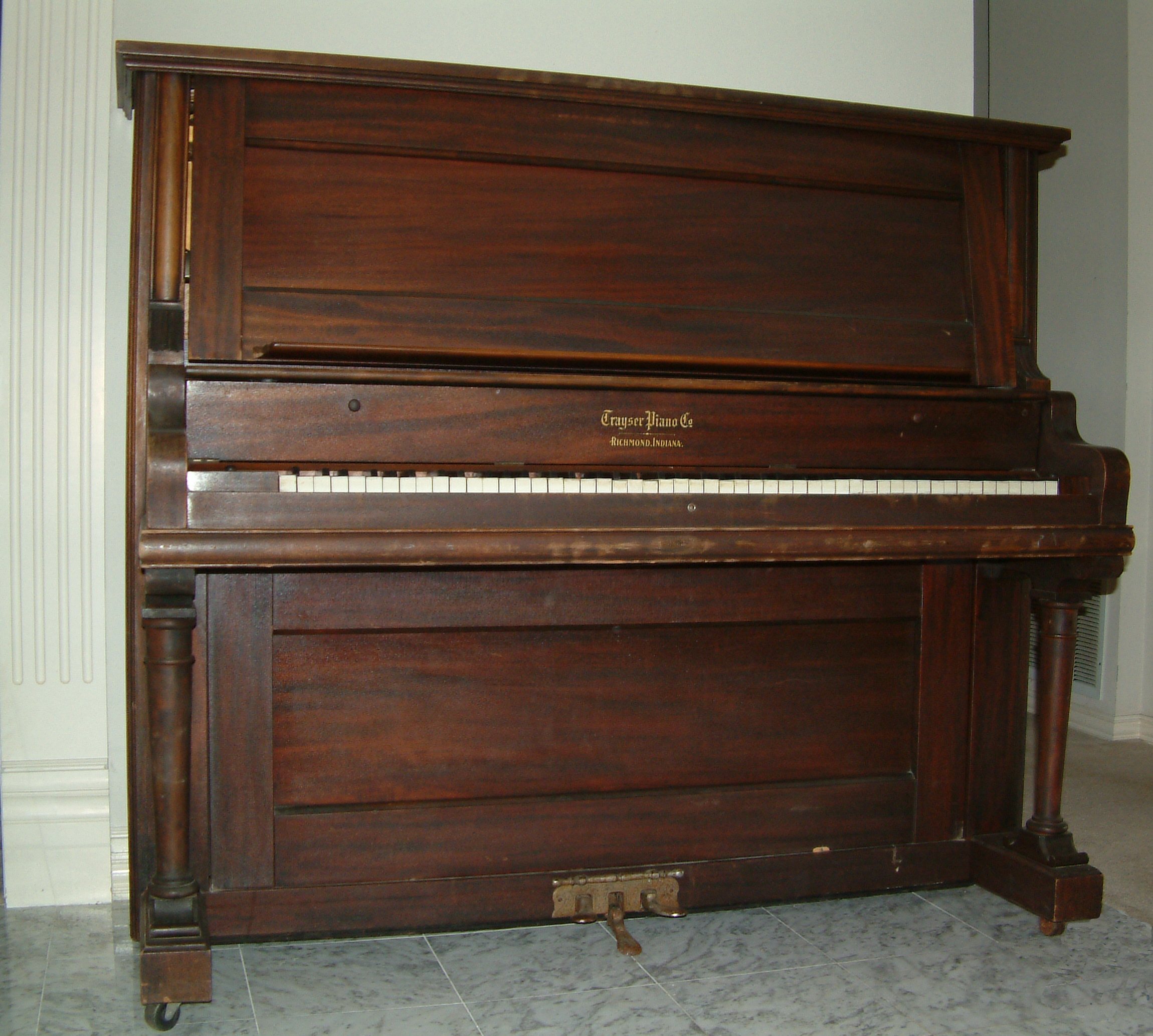
A Trayser upright piano built about 1875

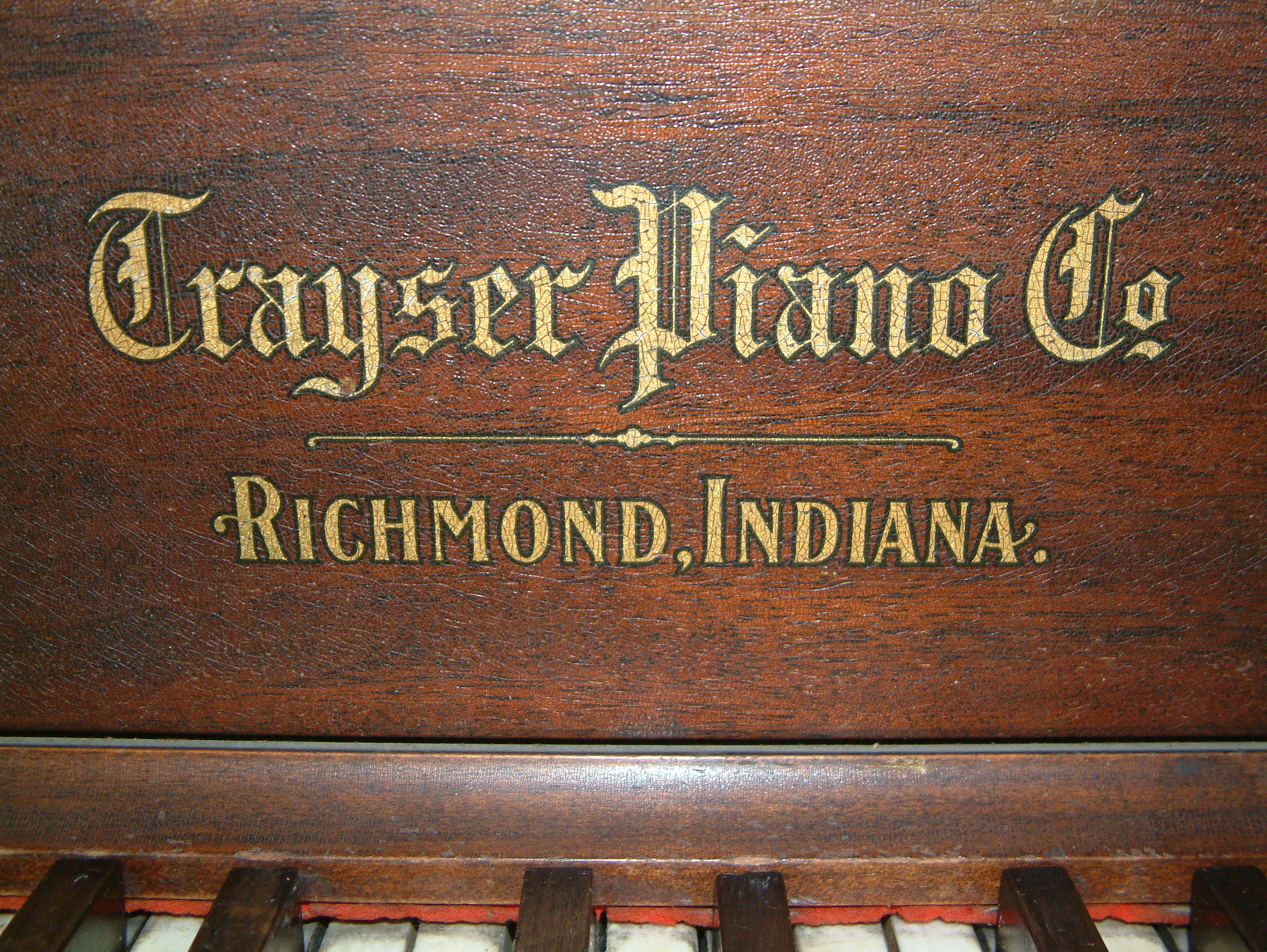
The Trayser logo, just above the keyboard, 1875

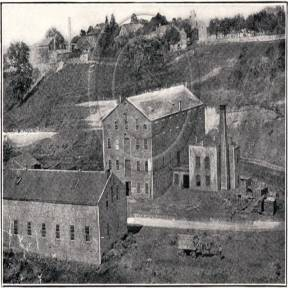
The first Trayser Piano Company factory, 1877

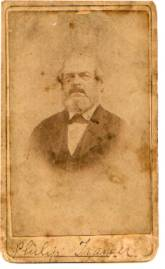
Phillip P. Trayser (1811–1895), George's younger brother, 1893

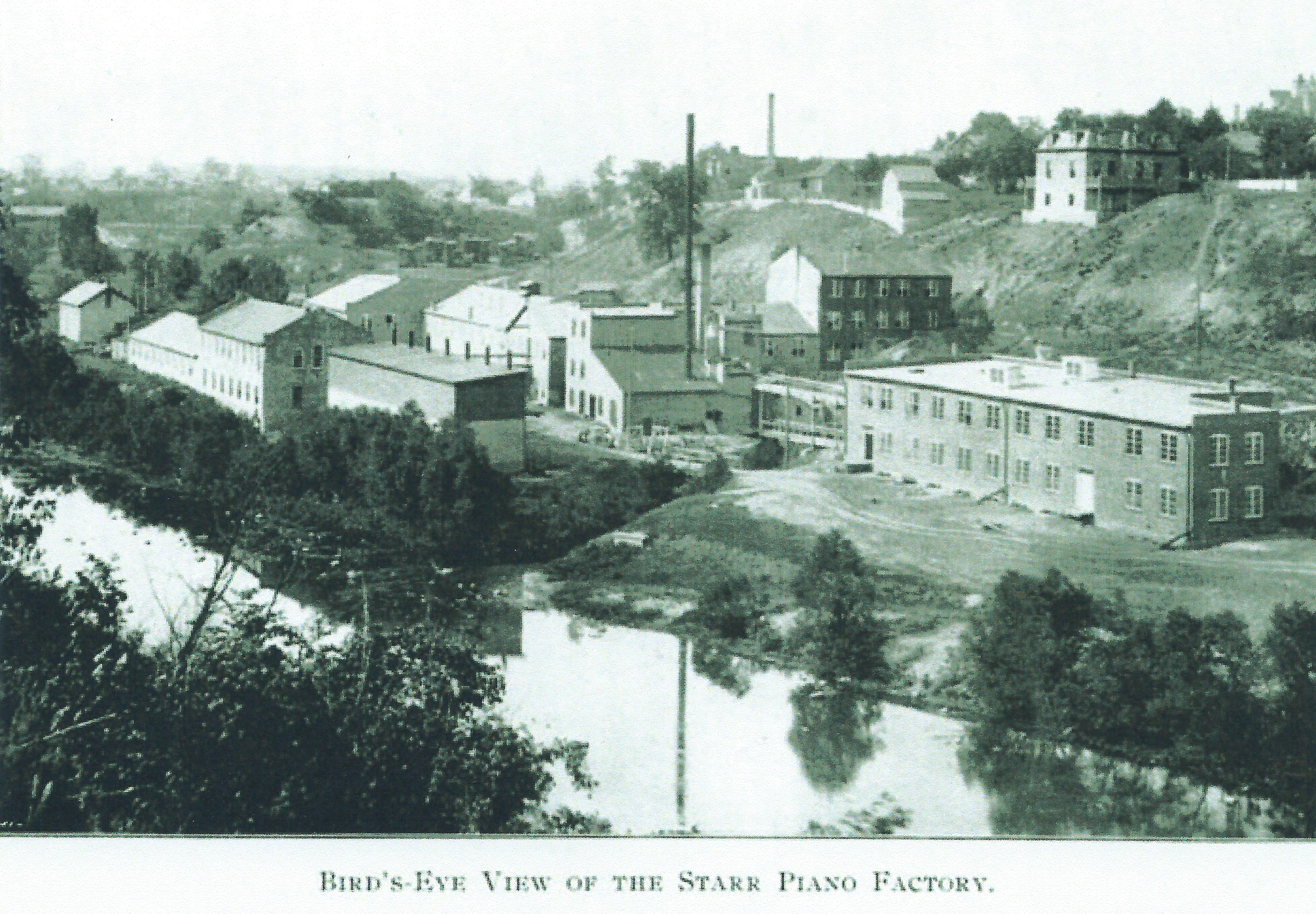
Starr piano factory, 1893

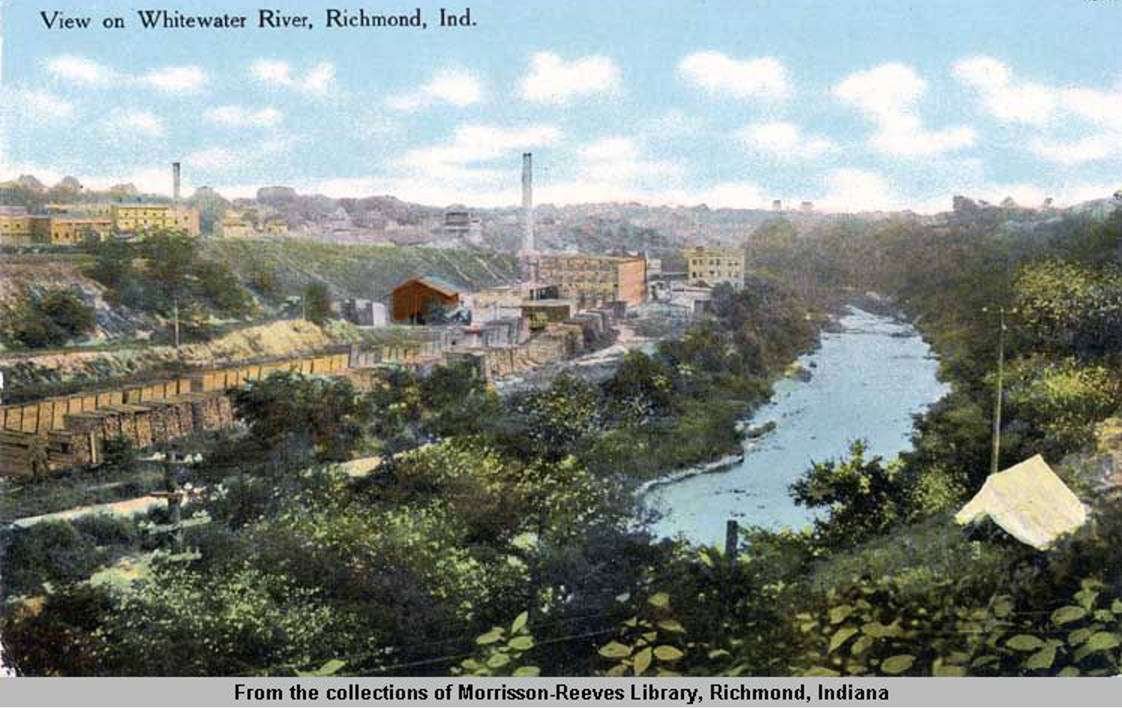
Wood curing for years before Starr piano, 1903

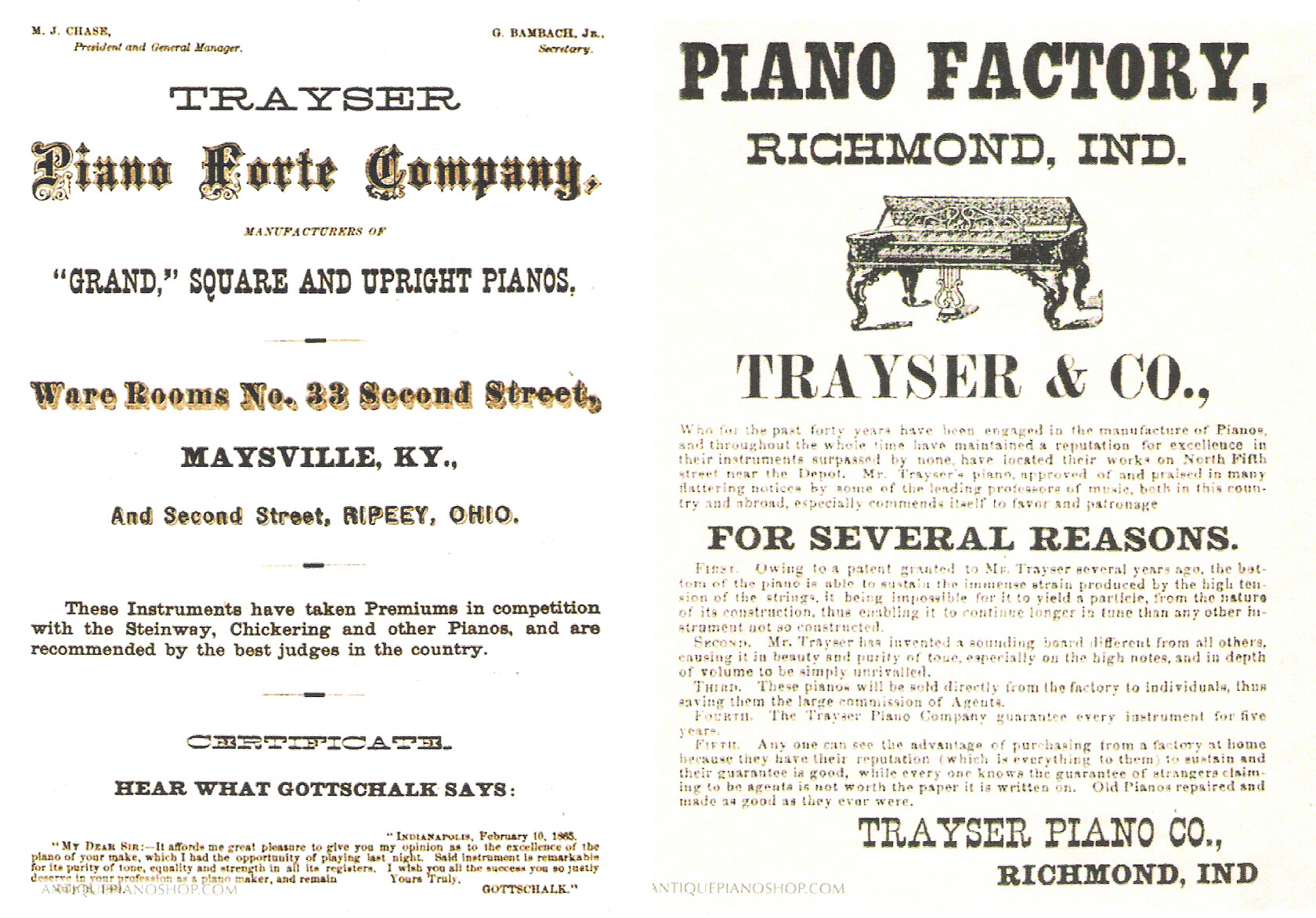
ad in Richmond paper, 1865

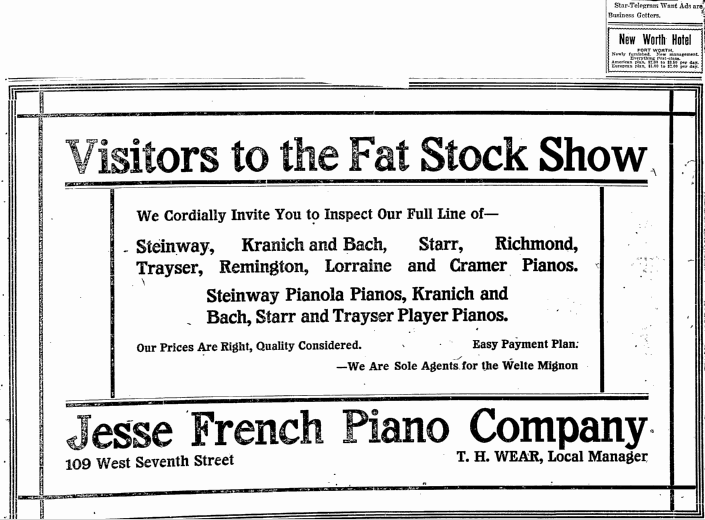
ad in Fort Worth paper, 1911

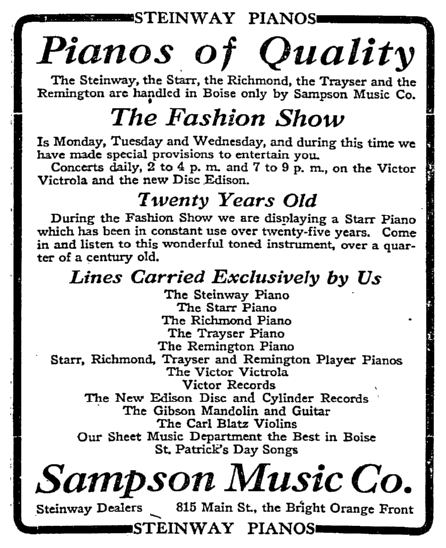
ad in Idaho paper, 1913

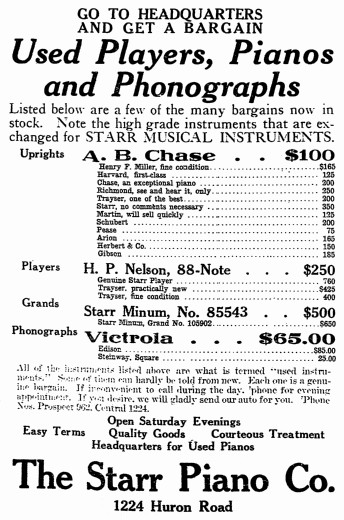
ad in Cleveland paper, 1918
