= Phono-Cut Record Company =

US record company (1910–1913)

The Phono-Cut Record Company produced the first vertical cut discs in the United States, from 1910 to 1913.

== History ==
Based in Boston, Phono-Cut was established in 1910 as a subsidiary of the Boston Talking Machine Company. The vertical cut recording system was developed by Pathé in France in 1905 and did not infringe on patents held by Victor and Columbia. However, customers willing to purchase vertical cut records also needed to obtain special equipment to play them, equipped with a sapphire ball in the reproducer rather than the standard steel needle. Consequently, the public's marginal interest in vertical cut technology was not enough to keep Boston Talking Machine afloat, and in 1913 it was sold to Morris Keen and folded into his Keen-O-Phone firm.

== Legacy ==
Phono-Cut records utilized only one system of numbering starting with 5000; the highest known number is 5244 ("Bake Dat Chicken Pie" by Collins and Harlan). Some members of the Boston Symphony Orchestra made Phono-Cut Records, among them the clarinetist Georges Grisez. Henry Burr also made some records for Phono-Cut. As they were made for a failed system, and most remaining vertical cut records were scrapped during the shellac drives of World War II, Phono-Cut discs are not common, though they are not viewed as exceptionally valuable by collectors. Nevertheless, by bringing the vertical cut process to the United States, Phono-Cut paved the way for other labels, such as Rex Records (1912), Gennett Records, Paramount Records, Okeh Records and Brunswick Records, to enter the marketplace using vertical cut technology until the Victor and Columbia patents were declared expired in 1921.
