= Grisez =

Grisezis a French surname. Notable people with the surname include:

- Georges Grisez (1884–1946), French-American clarinetist
- Germain Grisez (1929–2018), French-American philosopher
- Grégory Grisez (born 1989), Belgian footballer
- Joanna Grisez (born 1996), French rugby union and sevens player
