= Doc Roberts =

Doc Roberts may refer to

- Fiddlin' Doc Roberts (1897-1978), American fiddler
- Dave Roberts (baseball manager) (born 1972), American baseball manager and former player
