= Lucien Wulsin III =

American lawyer

Lucien Wulsin III (September 21, 1916 – August 23, 2009) was a lawyer, entrepreneur, banker, arts advocate, university trustee and erstwhile performer.

== Birth, education, military and law career ==
Wulsin was born on September 21, 1916, in Cincinnati, Ohio. He died on August 23, 2009, in Boulder, Colorado. He is a descendant of the Baldwin Piano Wulsins of Cincinnati.

Wulsin is a graduate of St. Georges School, Harvard College and the University of Virginia Law School. He practiced law with the firm of Kyte, Conlan, Wulsin and Vogeler.

Wulsin served in the United States Army in World War II as a First Lieutenant. He fought on the beaches of Normandy, where he earned the Purple Heart.

== Baldwin Piano ==
Wulsin's grandfather learned the piano business from piano maker Dwight Hamilton Baldwin. After the tenures of his grandfather and father, Wulsin III became president, chairman and CEO of Baldwin Piano Company in 1961. He served in these capacities until 1974, and remained with the company until 1981.^{1} During his tenure, Baldwin research contributed to American space flight, a 9-foot concert grand piano was unveiled, and Baldwin stock began trading on the NYSE.

Wulsin supported music education and contributed to the American Music Conference.

== Volunteer ==
After retiring in 1981, Wulsin occupied himself with volunteer activities. In 1981, he became chairman of the Colorado Council on the Arts and Humanities.

His obituary in Boulder's Daily Camera states that he was also on the board of the National Council on the Arts and Humanities, and Chairman of the Board of the University of Denver.^{1} He also served on the boards of the Colorado Symphony Orchestra, Music Association for Aspen, the National Endowment for the Arts and National Public Radio.

In 2002, Wulsin founded the Society for Creative Aging, of which he was Chairman Emeritus until his death. He explained the dramatic increase in his volunteer work after retiring saying: "As you age, you tend to insulate yourself from the world going on around you. I felt as long as I'm active and being part of something larger than myself, I won't close up." ^{2}

== Naropa ==
Wulsin lived his retirement in Boulder, Colorado, where he served as an original member (1986) of the board of trustees of Naropa University. According to the book American Buddhism, Wulsin helped Naropa to detach from Vajradhatu Society, a Buddhist organization started by Naropa's founder Chogyam Trungpa, helping its institutional accreditation with the North Central Association.

The Lucien Wulsin Scholarship in the Performing Arts is awarded to two incoming or returning MFA in Theater or BFA in Performance students at Naropa University.

On June 6, 2005, Mr. Wulsin was interviewed as part of the NAMM Oral History Program, established to preserve the history of the music products industry. During his interview he spoke of his family's long history with the Baldwin Piano Company and his passion for the music business. He sought the public school market when home organs emerged as tough competitors to pianos in the 1960s.^{1}

== Honors ==
In 2006, a dance studio at the Nalanda campus of Naropa University was named after him in honor of his 90th birthday. He performed a dance he had choreographed. In June 2007, he was honored with the Minoru Yasui Community Volunteer Award by the University of Virginia Law School. In 2009, The Society for Creative Aging's annual festival was named "2009 Lucien Wulsin Creative Arts Festival" in honor of "one of our pioneers of the creativity and aging movement."^{1} In May 2010 The New Republic published a poem in his honor, written by novelist and poet Bruce Ducker.

== Personal ==
Lucien Wulsin was born into an Episcopalian family and in later years was a fan of Buddhist philosophy, having befriended many Buddhists over the years. He died on August 23, 2009, in his Boulder, Colorado, home. He was one of seven children. Lucien had married three times: Eleanor Tubman Wulsin, Joan Friedlander Fox, and Pamela Wulson.

A memorial service was held at the Performing Arts Center at Naropa University in Boulder, CO on August 29, 2009.

== Children ==
Wulsin is survived by his five children: Lucien Wulsin IV of Los Angeles, CA; Jeanne Bennett of Putney, VT; Harry Wulsin of Palm Beach, FL; Dianne Wulsin of Lillhammer Norway; and Winthrop Wulsin of Lowell, MA. He also had 6 stepchildren, eight grandchildren and two great-grandchildren.

He is also survived by several siblings: his brother John Wulsin and two sisters, Peggy (Wulsin) Kite and Betsey (Wulsin) Bennett; and good friend, Sheri Kimball.
