= Marc Enfroy =

American musician (born 1965)

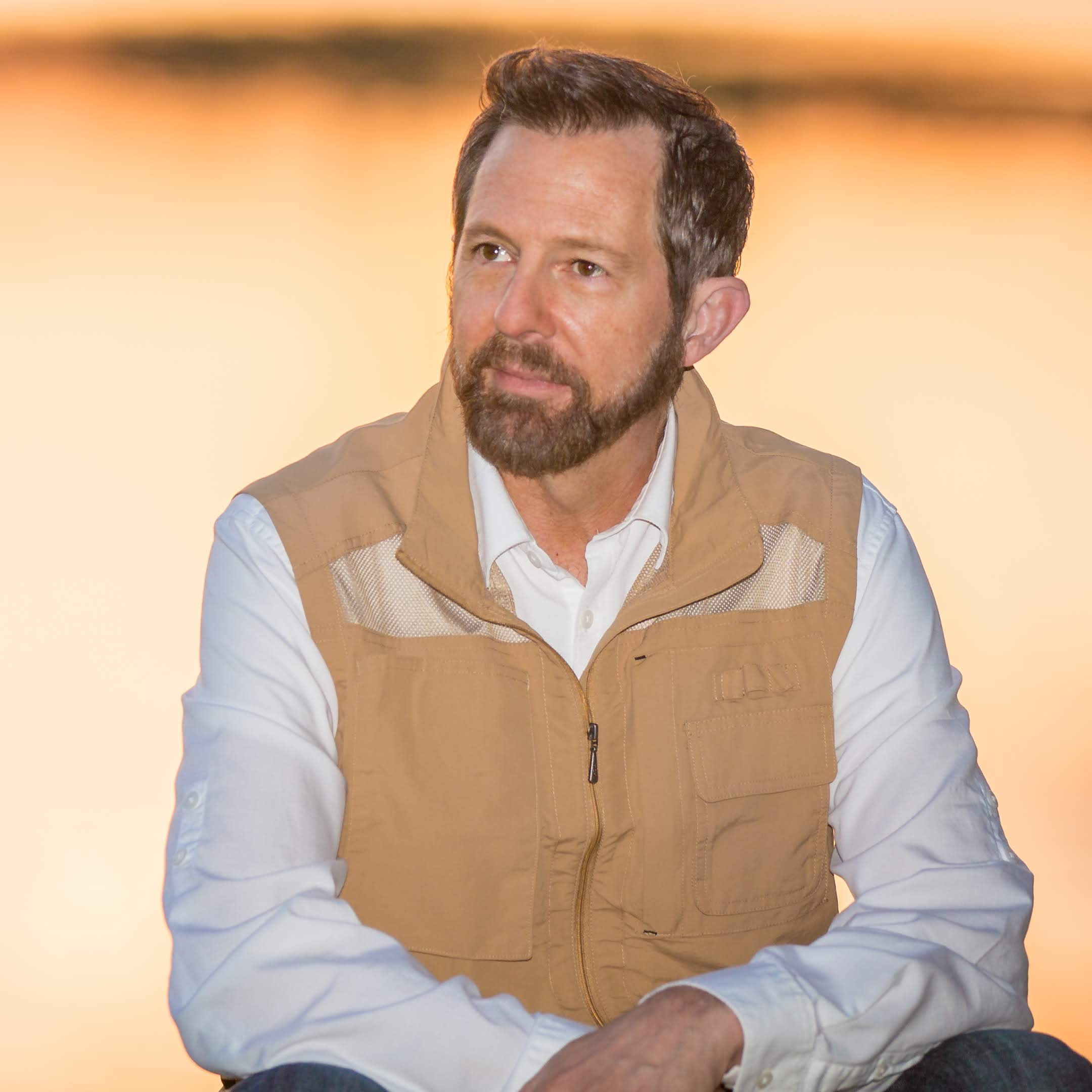

Background information
- Born: 1965 (age 60–61)
- Origin: Metropolitan Detroit, United States
- Genres: New age, neoclassical, classical, symphonic metal, progressive rock
- Occupations: Composer, songwriter, producer
- Years active: 2008–present
- Label: Dream Score Music
- Website: www.marcenfroy.com

Marc Maurice Enfroy (born 1965) is an American composer, songwriter and producer who describes his music as "cinematic piano" due to its score-like, piano-driven nature. Born into a musical family, he is the grandson of radio entertainer and Nashville Songwriters Hall of Fame inductee Bradley Kincaid, a.k.a. “The Kentucky Mountain Boy.” Enfroy has released several studio albums and is best known for his fifth album, "Crossroads", which peaked at number 2 on the Billboard New Age Albums Chart in August 2016 and was the fourth best-selling iTunes album in Metro Detroit for the week of August 4, 2016.

His debut release, Unbounded, earned the Zone Music Reporter Lifestyle Music Award for Best Neo-Classical Album of the Year in 2008.

== Discography ==
=== Studio albums ===
- 2008 – "Unbounded"
- 2009 – "Awakening" (also released as "Arising" on MG Music label)
- 2011 – "Unconditional"
- 2012 - "Dreams of the Forest"
- 2016 - "Crossroads"
- 2019 - "Surrounded"
- 2026 - "Threads Across Time"

=== Singles and EPs ===
- 2010 – "Acceptance"
- 2016 - "Your Silence is a Razor (feat. Aili Laine)"
- 2016 - "Fading White (feat. Lila Ives)"
- 2016 - "Shed my Skin (feat. Lila Ives)"
- 2019 - "Aotearoa"
- 2019 - "Land of Fire and Ice"
- 2019 - "Kilkenny Rain"
- 2019 - "Flight of the Monarch"
- 2019 - "Lavande de Provence"
- 2020 - "Taken Away (Reprise)"
- 2020 - "Moonlit Dreams Reprise"
- 2020 - "Melankholiya"
- 2021 - "Je t'aime"
- 2022 - "The Dance"
- 2022 - "Before the Dawn (Solo Piano Reprise)"
- 2022 - "Je t'aime (Extended Version)"
- 2022 - "Us"
- 2022 - "Miracle in the Glade (Felt Piano Reprise)"
- 2023 - "Wedding Music Instrumentals for Piano and Strings"
- 2023 - "Pure"
- 2025 - "Visions"
- 2026 - "An Unbroken Thread"
- 2026 - "A Good Heart: Echoes"
