= Jaybird Coleman =

Background information
- Born: Burl C. Coleman; May 20, 1896; Gainesville, Alabama, United States
- Died: January 28, 1950 (aged 53) Tuskegee, Alabama, United States
- Genres: Country blues
- Occupations: Instrumentalist, singer
- Instruments: Harmonica, guitar
- Years active: 1926 – late 1940s
- Labels: Gennett; Black Patti; Silvertone; OKeh; Columbia

Burl C. "Jaybird" Coleman (May 20, 1896 – January 28, 1950) was an American country blues harmonica player, vocalist, and guitarist. He was a popular musical attraction throughout Alabama and recorded several sides in the late-1920s and early-1930s.

== Biography ==
Coleman was born to a family of sharecroppers in Gainesville, Alabama, United States. While he and his three brothers endured hard physical labor, he was exposed to musical influences from his fellow sharecroppers in singing and discovering traditional folk songs. At age 12, he was introduced to the harmonica, in large part teaching himself, and was encouraged by his parents to hone his skills as an alternative to their wearying occupation. He performed locally for small wages at dance halls and parties.

In 1914, upon the outbreak of the First World War, Coleman joined the United States Army and was stationed at Fort McClellan for the entirety of the conflict. At the fort, he developed a reputation for being stubbornly independent, often disobeying the Army's strict code of conduct. As a result, his superior officers would call him Jaybird, a nickname associated with him for the rest of his life. During this time Coleman first performed for large crowds as he entertained his fellow soldiers. After his military discharge, he briefly returned to Gainesville, working for a few months as a farm labourer, before relocating with his younger brother, Joe, to Bessemer, Alabama, and becoming a full-time musician.

In 1922, Coleman teamed up with the singer and guitarist Big Joe Williams in tours across Alabama. He then traveled for two years with the Rabbit Foot Minstrels, a popular tent show, making appearances throughout the South. Returning to Bessemer, Coleman married a popular local singer, and the couple supported themselves by performing as a duo. The Colemans were regular churchgoers and were renowned in the black community for their renditions of gospel songs. As a blues musician, Coleman was popular with black and white audiences alike. Occasionally he would play a harmonica as he strolled through the streets, drawing a crowd that followed him.

In 1926, Coleman began recording for Gennett Records, Silvertone Records, and Black Patti Records as a solo performer and as a member of the Bessemer Blues Pickers. His records were met with commercial success, but he asserted he was never compensated for his work. Despite his treatment by white-owned record companies, he allowed a charter of the Ku Klux Klan to manage his touring schedule and expand his audience to major southern cities. Typically, Coleman's performances featured little or no accompaniment in a style rooted in the work songs of his childhood. He particularly favored the high-pitched E and D harps and played them with a heavily choked cross-harp technique, marked by a rapid hand vibrato. In the 1930s, Coleman was loosely associated with the Birmingham Jug Band, a group he helped form, and recorded with them in sessions for OKeh Records and Columbia Records. In 1930, he recorded "Coffee Grinder Blues" for Columbia, which, in a dispute with the label over payment, he blocked from wider release. It is his rarest record.

Coleman continued to perform on street corners in Bessemer, Alabama, throughout the 1930s and 1940s. By the end of the 1940s, he disappeared from the music scene.

He died of cancer on January 28, 1950, in Tuskegee, Alabama.

== Compilation ==
- Jaybird Coleman & the Birmingham Jug Band, Complete Recorded Works in Chronological Order: 1927–1930 (Document, 1992)
