= Challenge Records =

Challenge Records may refer to:

- Challenge Records (1920s), an American record label sold by the Sears-Roebuck Company
- Challenge Records (1950s–1960s label), an American record label co-founded by Gene Autry
- Challenge Records (1994), a Dutch jazz and classical record label
