= Starr Piano Company Warehouse and Administration Building =

- Formerly listed on the U.S. National Register of Historic Places
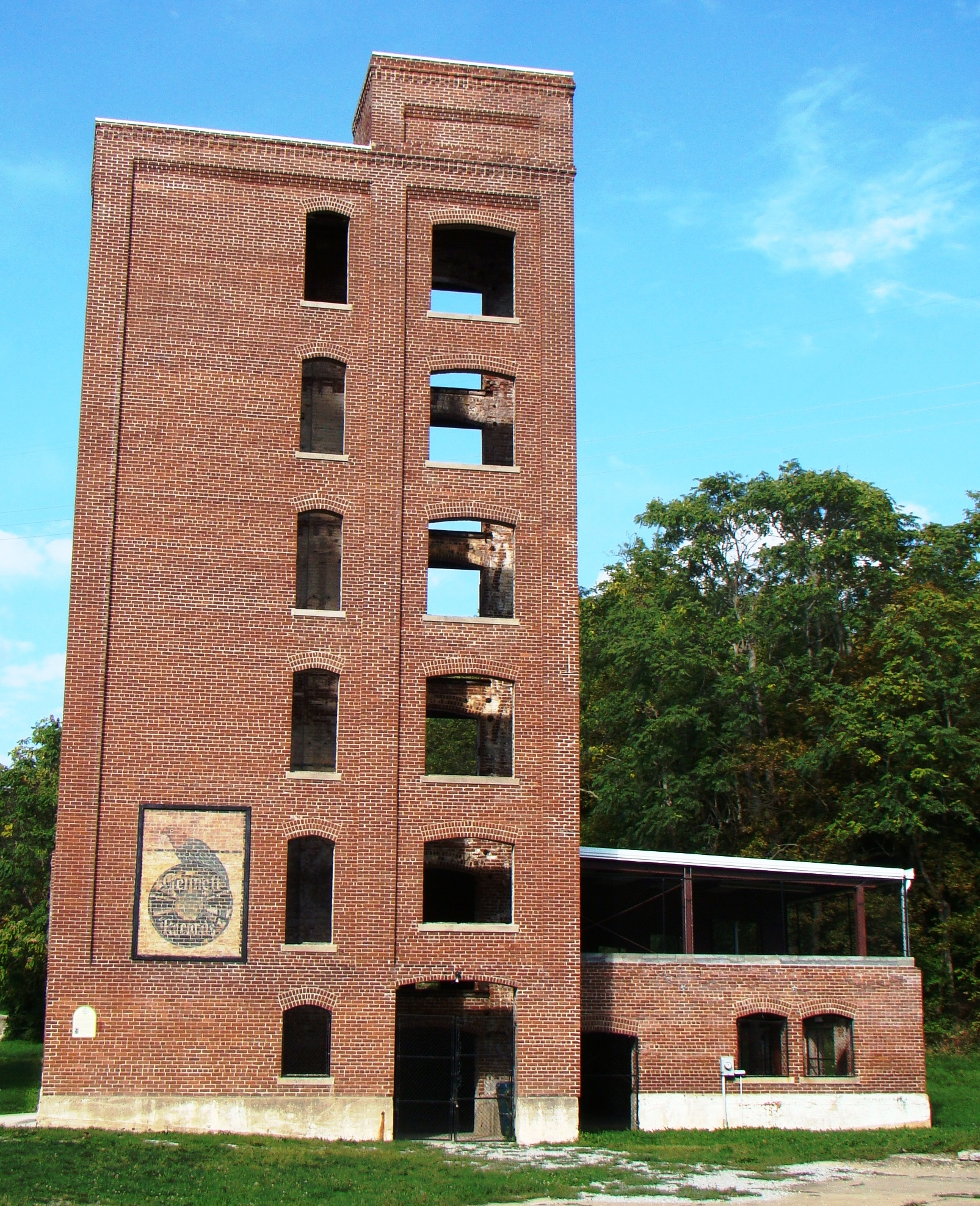
- Starr Piano Company Warehouse, September 2012
- Location: 101 S. 1st St., Richmond, Indiana
- Area: 3 acres (1.2 ha)
- Built: 1872, c. 1900
- NRHP reference No.: 81000024

Significant dates
- Added to NRHP: June 18, 1981
- Removed from NRHP: May 1, 1995

Starr Piano Company Warehouse and Administration Building were two historic buildings located at Richmond, Indiana. The Administration Building was built about 1900, and was a two-story, five sided, brick industrial building.

It was listed on the National Register of Historic Places in 1981 and delisted in 1995.

The Gennett Records Walk of Fame begins Southeast of the building and follows 1st Street.
