= Red Onion Jazz Babies =

The Red Onion Jazz Babies was an early supergroup of the Jazz Age. Among its members were Louis Armstrong, Sidney Bechet, Lil Hardin and others in the early 1920s. As it comprised some of the most influential soloists and performers of the era, the group was significant in highlighting the early period of their careers (Armstrong would continue performing until his death in 1971). Although the group was only together for a short time, they recorded a few memorable songs, including "Terrible Blues" (1924).
