= Bradley Kincaid =

American folk singer and radio entertainer

- Born: William Bradley Kincaid; July 13, 1895; Point Leavell, Garrard County, Kentucky, United States
- Died: September 23, 1989 (aged 94) Springfield, Ohio, United States
- Genres: Folk
- Occupations: Singer; composer; musician; radio entertainer

William Bradley Kincaid (July 13, 1895 – September 23, 1989) was an American folk singer and radio entertainer.

== Biography ==
He was born in Point Leavell, Garrard County, Kentucky, but built a music career in the northern states. His debut radio performance came in 1926 on the National Barn Dance show on WLS-AM in Chicago, Illinois. A prolific composer of folk and country music tunes, the first edition of his 1928 songbook called My Favorite Mountain Ballads sold more than 100,000 copies; later editions brought the total to 400,000. He recorded on Gennett Records.

In 1935 he was working at WBZ-AM in Boston, Massachusetts, where he performed with a band that included young singer and banjo player Marshall Jones. Kincaid teased the 22-year-old fellow Kentuckian for always being grumpy when he came to the studio to do the early morning broadcast, nicknaming him "Grandpa" Jones. The moniker became permanent for the future Grand Ole Opry star.

Kincaid moved to Nashville, Tennessee, in 1945 where he too became a member of the Grand Ole Opry.

In 1971, he was inducted into the Nashville Songwriters Hall of Fame.

In 1988, the then 93-year-old Kincaid was involved in an automobile accident and sustained injuries from which he never fully recovered. He died in 1989 at the age of 94 in Springfield, Ohio and was interred there in the Ferncliff Cemetery.

Old Homestead Records released several volumes of Kincaid's mountain ballads, hymns, and old-time songs.

== See also ==
- Marc Enfroy
