= Challenge Records (1920s) =

American record label

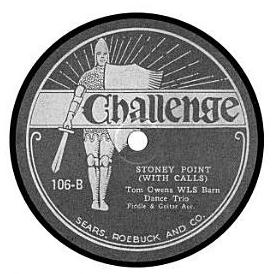
Challenge record from 1920s

Challenge Records was a record label sold by the Sears-Roebuck Company. Releases were drawn from other recordings on other labels in the late 1920s, such as Banner, Gennett, Paramount Records and others. Sears also had the Silvertone label and the same recording of "Black Bottom" by Joe Candullo & his Everglades Orchestra was released on both labels. Around 1929 Sears did away with Challenge and Silvertone, replacing them with Conqueror Records. Challenge discs generally sold for less than Silvertone ones because they seldom used songs requiring royalty payments and the label generally assigned pseudonyms to the artists. Introduced in the Spring 1927 catalog for just 24¢ per disc, Challenge bore the frank disclaimer, "If you want the best, we recommend the Silvertone." The last issues appeared in Sears’ Spring 1931 catalog.

== See also ==
- Challenge Records
- List of record labels
