= Asa Martin =

- Also known as: Jesse Coats (on Champion Records)
- Born: Asa F. Martin; June 25, 1900
- Origin: Winchester, Kentucky, USA
- Died: August 15, 1979 (aged 79)
- Genre: Old time
- Occupations: Musician, singer, guitarist
- Instrument: Guitar
- Years active: 1920s – 1940s

Asa F. Martin (June 25, 1900 – August 15, 1979) was an American old-time musician, singer, and guitarist who made many recordings during the 1920s and 1930s. He is best known for his collaborations with fiddle player Doc Roberts, for whom he played rhythm guitar. Roberts frequently played mandolin on Martin's recordings, and Roberts' son James also sang duets with Martin under the name Doc Roberts Trio. Martin also recorded under the pseudonym Jesse Coat on the Champion label.

== Early life ==
Martin was born in Winchester, Kentucky, into a musical family. His father, Rome Martin, played fiddle, performed clog dances, and knew many minstrel songs and recitations. His mother, Maude Crawford Martin, was a piano teacher, played acoustic guitar, and had a love for ballads. Growing up, Martin learned to play guitar, banjo, fiddle, and harmonica.

A pivotal early influence on Martin was George Logan, a local musician who came to the Martin home looking for work. Logan stayed with the family for two years, introducing Asa to tunes such as "Cumberland Gap", "Knoxville Girl", and "Joe Brown's Coal Mine". Martin and his brothers performed at local festivals and community gatherings. After high school, Martin briefly attended Louisville Medical College, but financial constraints prevented him from continuing, pushing him toward a career in music.

== Music career ==
=== Early touring and collaborations ===
In the early 1920s, Martin played in several dance bands while also working in a cinema as a background musician for silent movies. With the advent of talking pictures, vaudeville and theater work declined, leading him to pursue touring. Martin and his brother Earl toured on the RKO theater circuit, performing hits such as "Blue Skies" and "Hello Broadway, Give Me France", incorporating comedy routines and becoming known as entertainers.

In late 1926, Martin met Edgar Boaz, an accomplished banjo player and fiddler who had recorded with Doc Roberts. They toured locally and booked small venues, often planning shows only weeks in advance. After one tour, Boaz wrote to Martin saying he had fallen in love in Indiana and would not be returning. Around this same time, Martin met fiddler Doc Roberts at a fiddlers' convention in Winchester, Virginia.

=== Recordings with Doc Roberts ===
Martin and Roberts recorded extensively for Gennett Records, beginning in August 1927 in Richmond, Indiana. Their recording debut occurred on May 14, 1928, with "Second Love" and "Lost Love". Their records sold well, and at their second session in August 1928, Roberts' son James was added to sing soprano. Gennett advertised the group by describing James Roberts as Martin's "nephew" who begged his "uncle" to let him record with them.

Under the pseudonym Jesse Coat, Martin also recorded for the Champion label. His sides included "There Is No Place Like Home for a Married Man / She Ain't Built That Way", recorded on March 16, 1929.

Martin also recorded with other acts, including autoharpist E. M. Lewis and mandolinist Roy Hobbs, whose accompaniment to Martin has been compared to the sound of the Monroe Brothers. He collaborated with the Kentucky Hillbillies and the Ledford Sisters of the Coon Creek Girls in 1938.

=== Radio and music promotion ===
Beginning in 1930, Martin performed on radio stations in Kentucky and Cincinnati, Ohio. His program featured popular "battle of music" contests, with winners earning the opportunity to perform on his show.

Martin also influenced younger musicians, most notably David Akeman—later famous as Stringbean—who entered a talent contest judged by Martin. Martin forgot his name and called him "String Beans" due to his lanky build, a nickname that stayed with him throughout his career.

== The Cumberland Rangers and later life ==
With the onset of World War II, Martin left the music profession and worked in security at an Armco steel plant in Middletown, Ohio, until his retirement in 1965. He then moved to Irvine, Kentucky, where he had purchased land outside of town. Expecting a quiet retirement, he began jamming with friends, eventually reforming the Cumberland Rangers in the early 1970s. The group had a daily feature on Jim Gaskin's WIRV radio in Irvine.

In the early 1970s the band recorded the album Dr. Ginger Blue for Rounder Records, released in 1975. Martin remained active with the group until his death at home in 1979 from a heart attack.
