= Georges Grisez =

French-born American clarinetist

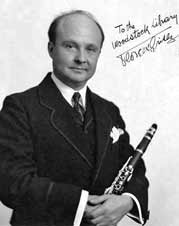

Background information
- Born: 31 March 1884
- Died: March 1946 (aged 61–62)
- Genre: classical
- Instrument: clarinet

Georges Grisez (31 March 1884 – March 1946) was a French-born American clarinetist. He was an active soloist, recording artist, and orchestral musician.

Born in Paris, Grisez studied with his father Arthur Grisez, and later at the Conservatoire de Paris, winning first prize in clarinet in 1902, before moving to the United States in October 1904. He served as principal clarinetist for the Boston Symphony Orchestra from 1904 to 1914 (the seventh principal of that group), and for the Philadelphia Orchestra for the 1922–23 season. He made several recordings on the Phono-Cut Label in 1913. He reportedly played flute in the New York Symphony. He also played with the New York Chamber Music Society, New York Philharmonic, the Letz Quartet, the Grisez Woodwind Quintet, and the Georges Longy Club (based on a similar Parisian wind ensemble organized by Paul Taffanel). He performed the Brahms Clarinet Quintet with the Letz Quartet in the 1921 Maverick Concerts. He may have served as a musician in the French army during the First World War.

He moved to Minnesota in 1923 to perform with the Minneapolis Symphony Orchestra and later teach at the University of Minnesota. He was one of the first clarinetists to play with the NBC Symphony, alongside principal Alexander Williams.

In the last years of his life, Grisez joined the Baltimore Symphony Orchestra as principal. He died during a 1946 Baltimore concert, shortly after performing the clarinet glissando at the beginning of George Gershwin's Rhapsody in Blue. His successor as principal, Ricardo Morales, noted that the piece is "one of the scariest to play" for the first clarinetist.
