= Dwight Hamilton Baldwin =

American piano manufacturer (1821–1899)

Dwight Hamilton Baldwin (September 15, 1821 – August 23, 1899) was a piano manufacturer in the United States, famous as the eponym and introducer of the Baldwin Piano.

Born in Erie County, Pennsylvania, Baldwin began his career as a teacher of the reed organ and violin. He opened a music store in Cincinnati, Ohio, in 1862, and became one of the biggest sellers of pianos in the Midwest. He and inventor John Warren Macy created the Baldwin piano in 1891, and introduced a grand piano in 1895.

Baldwin died in Cincinnati at the age of 78.
