= Baldwin Piano Company =

American piano company

- Type: Private
- Industry: Musical instruments
- Founded: 1890; 136 years ago
- Founder: Dwight Hamilton Baldwin
- Headquarters: Nashville, TN, United States (Note: For distribution. Baldwin pianos are manufactured in China.)
- Key people: James Curleigh (President & CEO)
- Products: Pianos
- Parent: Gibson
- Subsidiaries: Wurlitzer
- Website: Official website

The Baldwin Piano Company is an American piano brand. Founded in 1890, the company was for a time the largest U.S.-based manufacturer of keyboard instruments. In 2001, it was acquired by Gibson Brands, Inc. Baldwin ceased domestic production in December 2008, moving its piano manufacturing to China.

== History ==
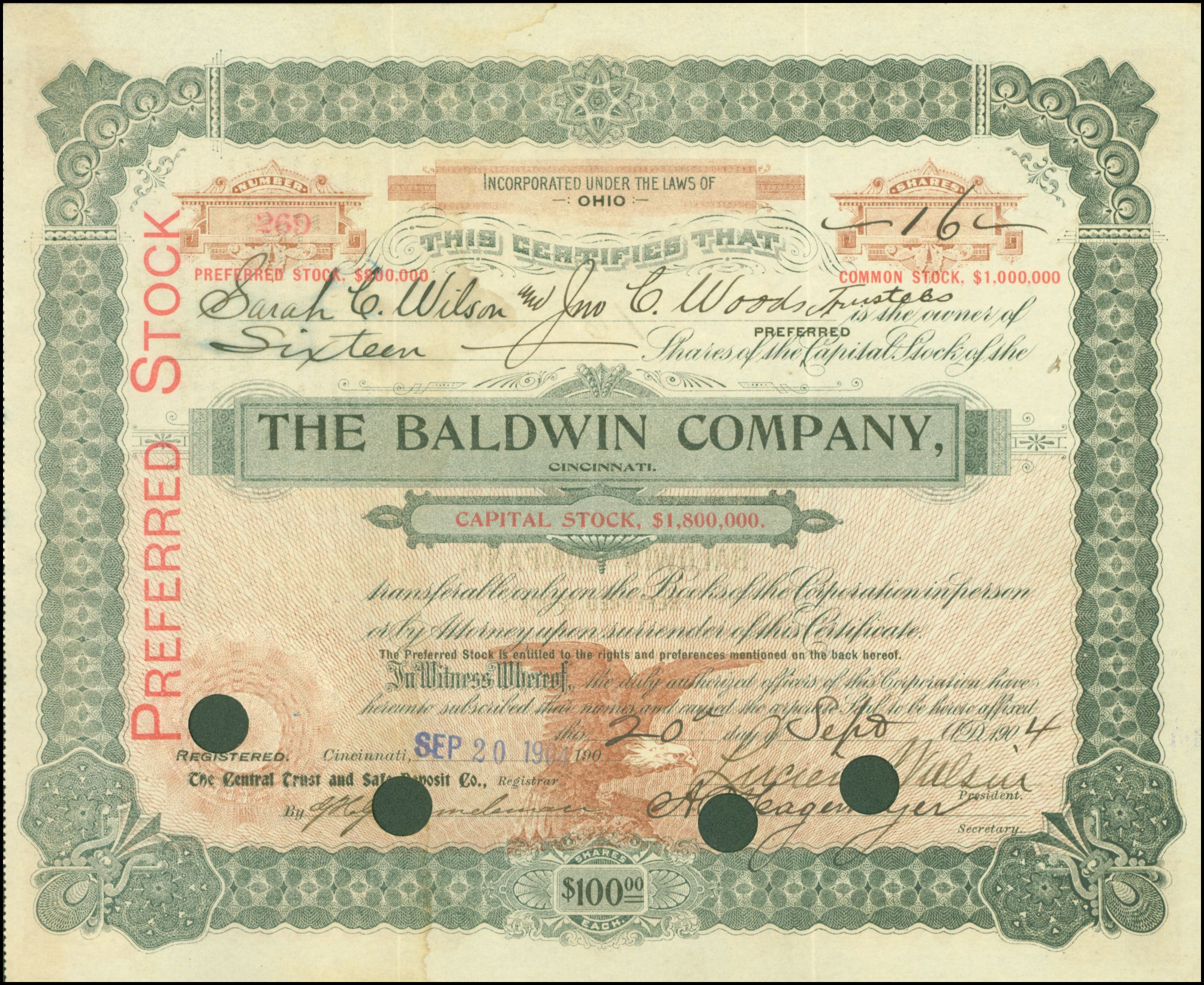
Share of the Baldwin Company, issued 20. September 1904

The company traces its origins to 1857, when Dwight Hamilton Baldwin began teaching piano, organ, and violin in Cincinnati, Ohio. In 1862, Baldwin started a Decker Brothers piano dealership and, in 1866, hired Lucien Wulsin as a clerk. Wulsin eventually became a partner in the dealership, which by then was known as the D.H. Baldwin & Company. The Baldwin company became the largest piano dealer in the Midwestern United States by the 1890s.

In 1889 or 1890, Baldwin vowed to build "the best piano that could be built" and subsequently formed two production companies: Hamilton Organ, which built reed organs, and the Baldwin Piano Company, which made pianos. The company's first piano, an upright, began selling in 1891. Baldwin introduced its first grand piano in 1895.

Dwight Baldwin died in 1899 and left the vast majority of his estate to fund missionary causes. Wulsin ultimately purchased Baldwin's estate and continued the company's shift from retail to manufacturing. The company won its first major award with its Model 112, which won the Grand Prix at the 1900 Exposition Universelle in Paris, becoming the first American-manufactured piano to win such an award. Baldwin-manufactured pianos also won top awards at the 1904 Louisiana Purchase Exposition and the 1914 Anglo-American Exposition. By 1913, Baldwin had retailers throughout the United States and was exporting to 32 countries.

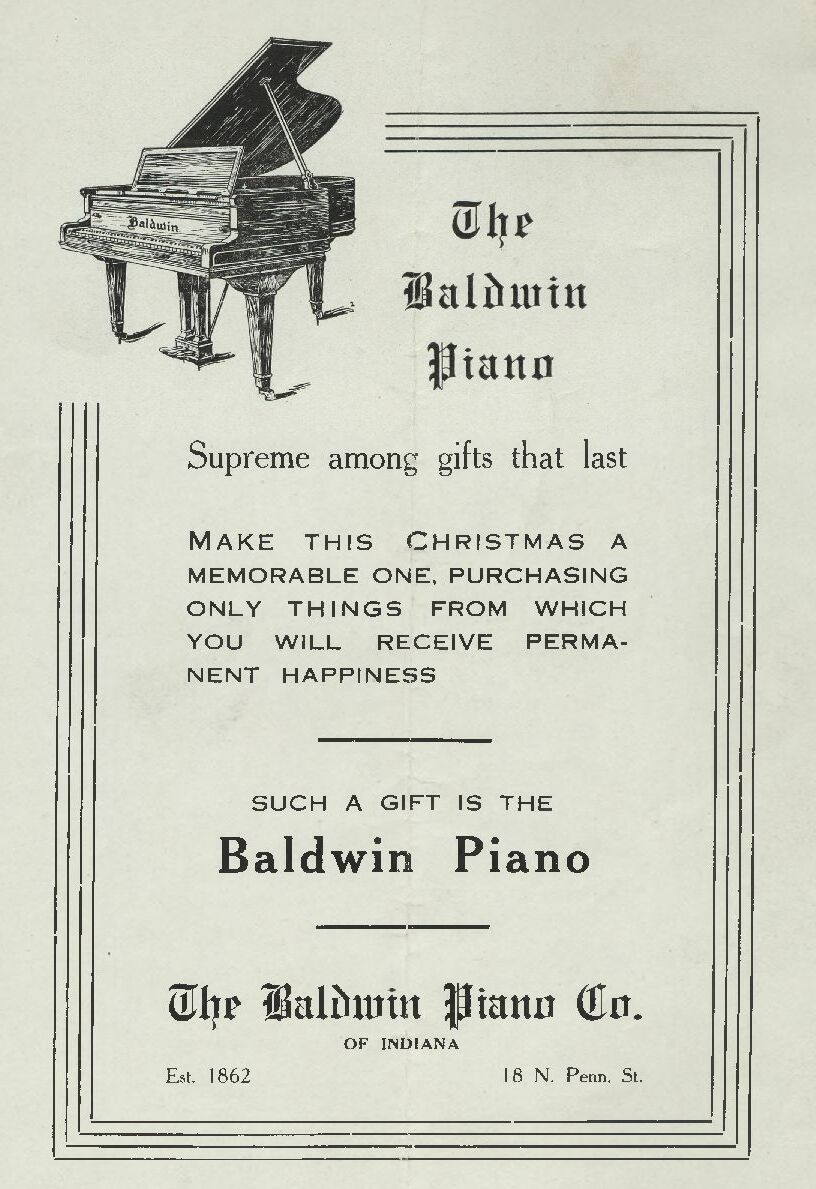
Concert at the Maennerchor building, 26 November 1920

Baldwin, like many other manufacturers, began building player pianos in the 1920s. A piano factory was constructed in Cincinnati. Player piano models became unpopular by the end of the 1920s, which, coupled with the beginning of the Great Depression, could have spelled disaster for Baldwin. However, Wulsin's son, Lucien Wulsin II, had become the company's president and had created a large reserve fund for such situations. These reserves enabled Baldwin to ride out the market downturn.

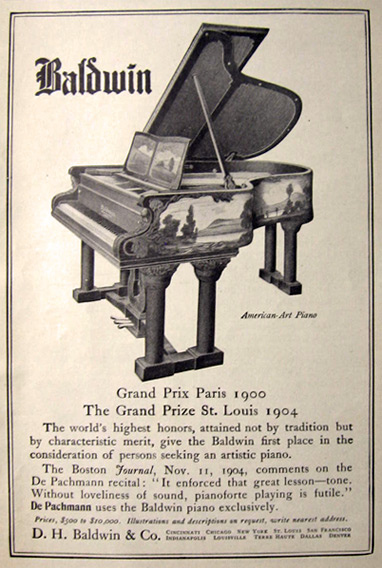
A 1905 Baldwin ad.

During World War II, the U.S. War Production Board ordered the cessation of all US piano manufacturing so their factories could be used for the war effort. Baldwin factories were used to manufacture plywood components for various aircraft, including the Aeronca PT-23 trainer and the stillborn Curtiss-Wright C-76 Caravan cargo aircraft. Lessons from constructing plywood aircraft wings helped Baldwin develop a 21-ply maple pinblock design used in its postwar piano models.

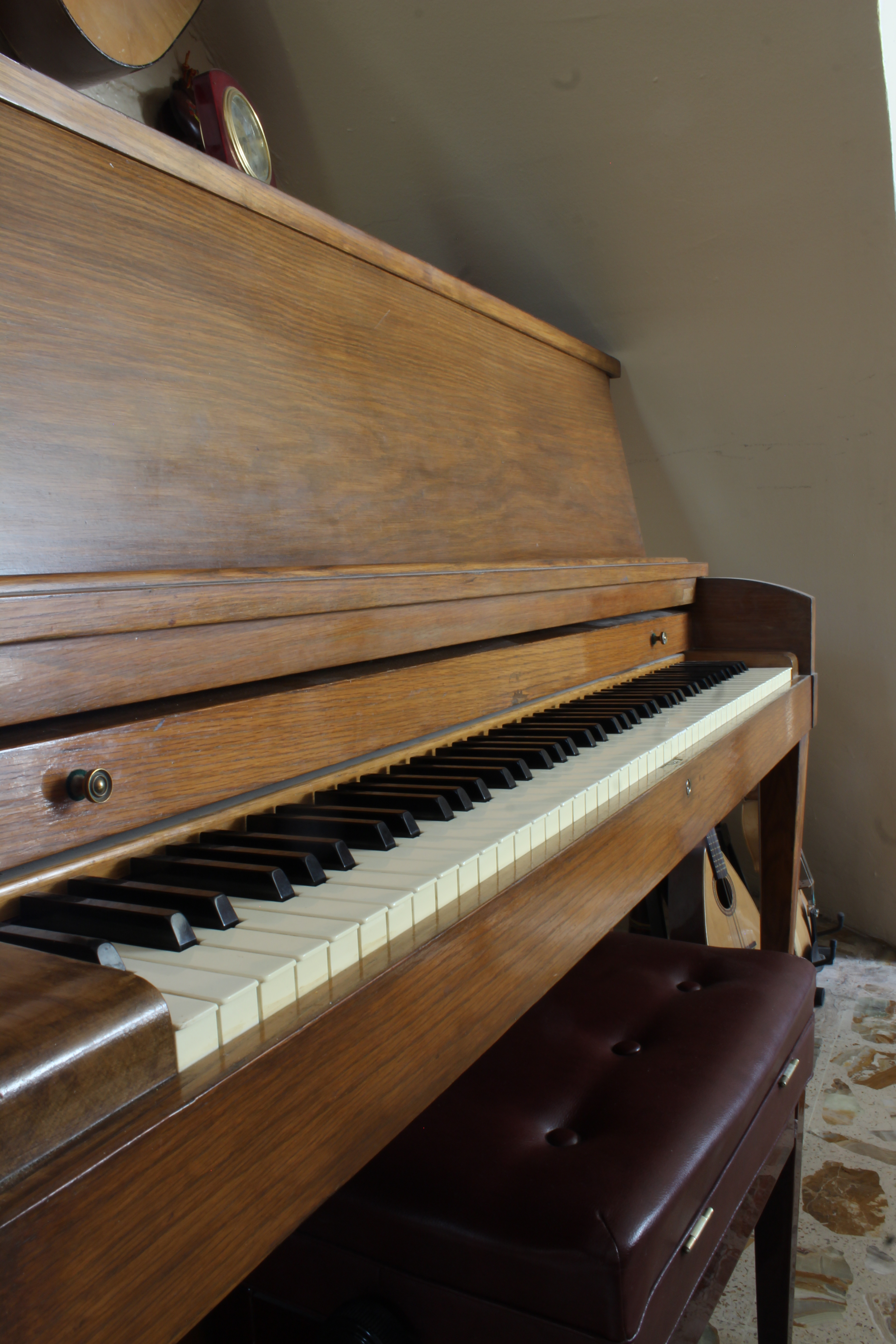
A Baldwin Hamilton manufactured in 1968.

After the war ended, Baldwin resumed selling pianos, and by 1953 the company had doubled production figures from prewar levels. In 1946, Baldwin introduced its first electronic organ (developed in 1941), which became so successful that the company changed its name to the Baldwin Piano & Organ Company. In 1961, Lucien Wulsin III became president. By 1963, the company had acquired German piano manufacturer C. Bechstein Pianofortefabrik; it would retain ownership until 1986. In 1959, Baldwin constructed a new piano manufacturing plant in Conway, Arkansas, to manufacture upright pianos; by 1973, the company had built one million upright pianos. In 1961, Baldwin built a piano factory in Greenwood, Mississippi, and later moved production of upright pianos there from Cincinnati.

The company next attempted to capitalize on the growth of pop music. After an unsuccessful bid to buy Fender Musical Instruments Corporation, Baldwin bought guitar manufacturer Burns of London in 1965 for $380,000, and began selling guitars through the company's piano retail outlets. Baldwin engineer Robert C. Scherer developed the Prismatone pickup for nylon-string guitars. But the Baldwin stores failed to interest many guitar buyers, and sales proved disappointing. In 1967, Baldwin bought Gretsch guitars, which had its own experienced guitar sales force and a distribution network of authorized retail outlets. However, Fender and Gibson continued to dominate, and sales did not reach expected levels. The Gretsch guitar operation would be sold back to the Gretsch family in 1989.

Throughout the 1970s, the company tried to diversify into financial services. Under the leadership of Morley P. Thompson, Baldwin bought dozens of firms and by the early 1980s owned more than 200 savings and loan institutions, insurance companies, and investment firms, including MGIC Investment Corporation. The company changed its name to Baldwin-United in 1977 after a merger with United Corp. In 1980, the company opened a new piano manufacturing facility in Trumann, Arkansas. By 1982, the piano business contributed only three percent of Baldwin's $3.6 billion revenues. The company, which had borrowed deeply to acquire companies and build facilities, was finding it increasingly difficult to meet its loan obligations. In 1983, the holding company and several of its subsidiaries were forced into bankruptcy with a total debt of over $9 billion—at that time, the largest bankruptcy ever. The piano business was not part of the bankruptcy.

During bankruptcy proceedings in 1984, the Baldwin piano business was sold to its management. The new company went public in 1986 as the Baldwin Piano and Organ Company and moved its headquarters to Loveland, Ohio.

Demographic changes and foreign competition slowed sales of keyboard instruments. The company responded by acquiring Wurlitzer to increase market share and by moving manufacturing overseas to reduce production costs. In 1998, the company moved its headquarters from Loveland to nearby Deerfield Township. Throughout the 1990s, the company's fortunes improved, and by 1998, the company's 270 employees at its Conway, Arkansas, facility were building 2,200 grand pianos a year. However, in 2001, Baldwin was again facing difficulties, and filed for bankruptcy once again. The company was bought by Gibson Guitar Corporation. In 2005, the company laid off some workers from its Trumann, Arkansas, manufacturing plant while undergoing restructuring.

As a subsidiary of Gibson Guitar Corporation, the company has manufactured instruments under the Baldwin, Chickering, Wurlitzer, Hamilton, and Howard names. Baldwin bought two piano factories in China in which they manufacture grand and vertical pianos. Models built in the factory in Zhongshan, China include the Baldwin Hamilton studio models B243 and B247, which are the most popular school pianos ever built. The much-larger factory in Dongbei is not building pianos at this time. Baldwin grand pianos are being built to Baldwin specification by Hong Kong-based Parsons Music Group. All new pianos are being sold under the Baldwin name, not Wurlitzer, Hamilton, or Chickering.

Baldwin stopped manufacturing new pianos in the United States in 2008, briefly retaining staff at its Trumann, Arkansas, factory for specialist work before closure and disposal of remaining inventory.

In 2020, Baldwin was inducted into the American Classical Music Hall of Fame.

== Models ==
=== Grand pianos ===
Grand piano models (as of 2020):

- BP 148: 4 ft 10 in (148 cm)
- BP 152 (Model R): 5 ft 0 in (152 cm)
- BP 165: 5 ft 5 in (165 cm)
- BP 178: 5 ft 10 in (178 cm)
- BP 190: 6 ft 3 in (190 cm)
- BP 211: 6 ft 11 in (211 cm)

=== Upright pianos ===
Upright piano models (as of 2020):

- B342/B42 Acrosonic: 43.5 inches (110 cm)
- B442/B42 Acrosonic: 43.5 inches (110 cm)
- B243/B47 Hamilton: 47 inches (120 cm)
- B252 Concert Vertical: 52 inches (130 cm)
- BP1
- BPE1
- BP3
- BP3T
- BP5
- BP-X5

== Notable performers ==
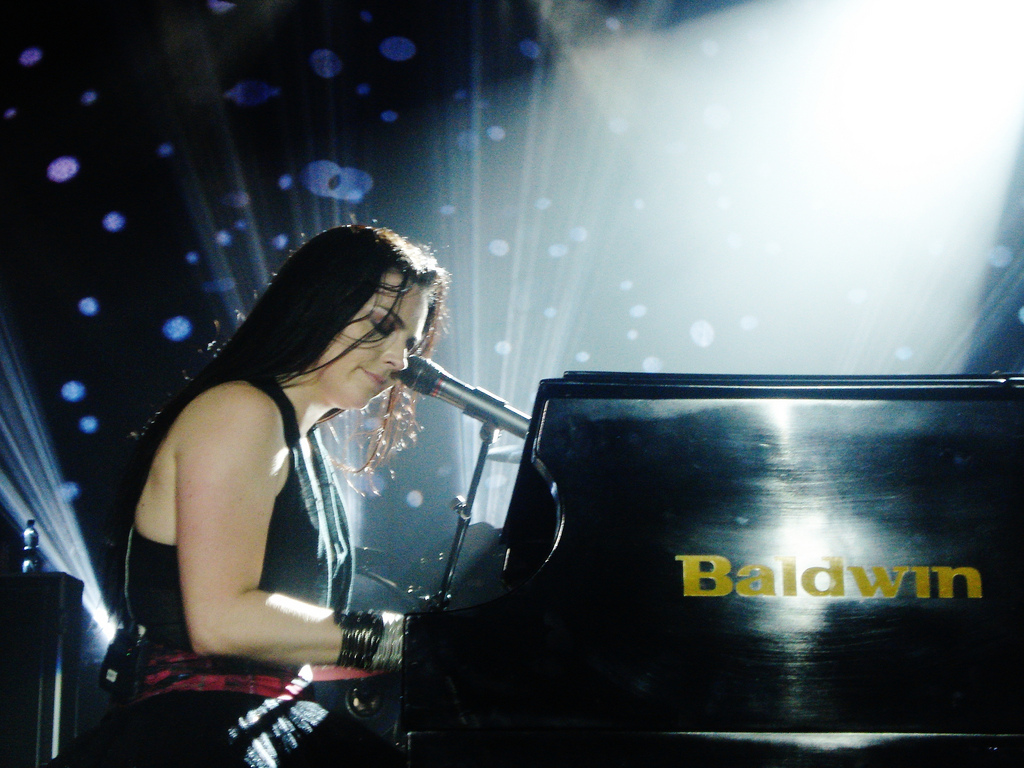
Evanescence's Amy Lee performing in 2011

Many distinguished musicians have chosen to compose, perform and record using Baldwin pianos, including the pianists Walter Gieseking, Claudio Arrau, Mike Shinoda, Jorge Bolet, Morton Estrin, Margaret Baxtresser (née Barthel), Earl Wild and José Iturbi and the composers Aaron Copland, Philip Glass, Igor Stravinsky, Béla Bartók, Stephen Sondheim, Leonard Bernstein, Lukas Foss, André Previn, and John Williams.

Popular entertainers who use Baldwin pianos include Ray Charles, Liberace, Richard Carpenter, Michael Feinstein, Ben Folds, Billy Joel, Cat Stevens, and Carly Simon, and jazz pianists Dave Brubeck, George Shearing and Dick Hyman. Amy Lee, the lead vocalist, pianist and keyboardist of Evanescence also uses this brand in most of her compositions, recordings and live performances. A Baldwin piano was played nightly by Paul Shaffer on the Late Show with David Letterman. Baldwin was the official piano of the television show Glee. Marian McPartland's long-running radio show Piano Jazz was hosted by Baldwin. Baldwin was second only to Steinway in its artist and symphony roster.

== Bibliography ==
- Crombie, David (2000). Piano: Evolution, Design, and Performance. Barnes and Noble Books. ISBN 0-7607-2026-6.
- "Baldwin Piano & Organ Company". Encyclopedia of Company Histories. Archived from the original on May 5, 2007 – via Answers.com.
