= Regal =

Regal may refer to:

== Companies ==
- Regal Beloit, usually referred to as Regal, an American manufacturer of electric motors
- Regal Cinema (disambiguation), several cinemas of that name
- Regal Cinemas, a major American theater chain
- Regal Cinemas (UK), a UK-based cinema chain
- Regal Entertainment, a Philippine film and television production company
- Regal Hotels International, a hotel operator listed on the Hong Kong Stock Exchange
- Regal Manufacturing Company, a maker of musical instruments in Indianapolis (1901–1904)
- Regal Musical Instrument Company, a maker of musical instruments in Chicago (1908–1954)
- Regal Petroleum, an oil company
- Regal Records (disambiguation), the name of several record labels
- Regal Theater (disambiguation)

== Musicians ==
- Regal, a Spanish electronic music producer and DJ

== Automobiles ==
- Regal (automobile), a United States automobile
- Buick Regal, a model of car produced by Buick
- Kia Optima Regal, a first-generation car model produced by Kia Motors
- Reliant Regal, a model of car produced by Reliant

== Other uses ==
- Regal (cigarette), a brand of cigarettes
- Regal (instrument), a keyboard instrument
- Regal (Ulmus), American hybrid elm tree
- Steve Regal (born 1951), retired American professional wrestler
- William Regal, a ring name of a British professional wrestler Darren Kenneth Matthews (born 1968)
