= Regent Theatre =

The Regent Theatre is the name of several theatres in various cities. including:

== Australia ==
- Regent Theatre, Adelaide
- Regent Theatre, Ballarat, later Regent Cinemas
- Regent Theatre, Brisbane
- Regent Theatre, Melbourne
- Regent Theatre, Sydney
- Regent Theatre, Wollongong

== Canada ==
- Regent Theatre, Oshawa, Ontario
- Regent Theatre (Picton, Ontario)
- Regent Theatre (Toronto) - historic cinema and live theatre venue in Toronto, Ontario

== New Zealand ==
- Regent on Broadway, a large theatre in Palmerston North
- Regent Theatre, Christchurch, now demolished
- Regent Theatre, Dunedin, famous for its annual second-hand book sale

== United Kingdom ==
- Regent Theatre, Ipswich
- Regent Theatre, Salford (destroyed by fire 1952)
- Regent Theatre, Stoke-on-Trent

== United States ==
- Regent Theatre (Arlington, Massachusetts)
- Regent Theatre (Los Angeles)
- Regent Theater Complex, Syracuse, New York

== See also ==
- Regal Theatre (disambiguation)
- Regent Cinema, a former cinema in Brighton, Sussex, England
- Regent Cinema, Deal, a former cinema in Deal, Kent, England
