= Regal Cinema (disambiguation) =

Regal Cinema is a cinema in Mumbai, India.

Regal Cinema may also refer to:

- Odeon Marble Arch, a.k.a. The Regal, England
- Regal Cinema, Uxbridge, a former cinema building in England
- Regal Cinema, Wakefield, England
- Regal Cinema, Dublin, Ireland
- Regal Theatre, Adelaide, a cinema in Adelaide, South Australia
- Regal Theatre, New Delhi or Regal Cinema, Connaught Place, New Delhi, India

== See also ==
- Regal (disambiguation)
- Regal Cinemas, a US cinema chain
- Regal Cinemas (UK), a former UK cinema chain operated by ABC Cinemas
- Regal Entertainment, a Philippine film and television production company
- Regal Theater (disambiguation)
