= List of stage names: S =

This list of stage names lists names used by those in the entertainment industry, alphabetically by their stage name's surname (or the best approximation) followed by the given name (or the best approximation) where the surname begins with "S". One-word stage names are presented in List of one-word stage names.

Stage name	Birth name	Life	Notability	Notes
Thaman S	Ghantasala Sai Srinivas	1983–	Indian composer and playback singer	
Raphael Saadiq	Charles Ray Wiggins	1966–	American singer and songwriter	
Maverick Sabre	Michael Stafford	1990–	Irish singer, songwriter and rapper	
Kenji Sahara	Masayoshi Kato	1932–	Japanese actor	Also known as Tadashi Ishihara and Jun Manjōme
Martine St. Clair	Martine Nault	1962–	Canadian singer	
Pam St Clement	Pamela Ann Clements	1942–	English actress	
Lili St. Cyr	Marie Frances Van Schaack	1917–1999	American dancer	
James St. James	James Clark	1966–	American television personality and author	
Rebecca St. James	Rebecca Smallbone	1977–	Australian singer	
Susan Saint James	Susan Jane Miller	1946–	American actress and activist	
Austin St. John	Jason Lawrence Geiger	1974–	American actor and martial artist	
Betta St. John	Betty Jean Striegler	1929–2023	American actress, singer and dancer	
Bridget St John	Bridget Anne Hobbs	1946–	English singer-songwriter and musician	
Jeff St John	Jeffrey Leo Newton	1946–2018	Australian musician	
Jill St. John	Jill Arlyn Oppenheim	1940–	American actress	
Mark St. John	Mark Leslie Norton	1956–2007	American musician (White Tiger)	
Pete St John	Peter Mooney	1932–2022	Irish folk singer-songwriter	
Nick St. Nicholas	Klaus Kassbaum	1943–	German musician (Steppenwolf)	
Lara Saint Paul	Silvana Savorelli	1945–2018	Eritrean-Italian singer and entertainer	
Crispian St. Peters	Robin Peter Smith	1939–2010	English singer	
Buffy Sainte-Marie	Beverley Jean Santamaria	1941–	American singer-songwriter, musician and social activist	
Pat Sajak	Patrick Leonard Sajdak	1946–	American television personality	
S. Z. Sakall	Jakab Grünwald	1883–1955	Hungarian-American actor	Also known as Gärtner Sándor and Gerő Jenő
Chika Sakamoto	Chika Ishihara	1959–	Japanese voice actress	
David Sale	Ernest Swindells	1932–	English-Australian author, television screenwriter and playwright	
Soupy Sales	Milton Supman	1926–2009	American comedian and actor	
Ola Salo	Rolf Svensson	1977–	Swedish musician and singer (The Ark)	
Lea Salonga	Maria Imutan Salonga	1971–	Filipina singer, actress and columnist	
Magic Sam	Samuel Maghett	1937–1969	American musician	
Washboard Sam	Robert Brown	1910–1966	American singer and musician	
Olga Samaroff	Lucy Hickenlooper	1880–1948	American pianist, music critic and teacher	
Aldo Sambrell	Alfredo Brell	1931–2010	Spanish actor	
Emma Samms	Emma Samuelson	1960–	English actress	
Sugar Sammy	Samir Khullar	1976–	Canadian comedian, actor, writer and producer	
Savanna Samson	Natalie Oliveros	1967–	American former pornographic actress	
Lauren Samuels	Lauren Bonner	1988–	English singer and actress	Also known as Lauren Alvarado
Paul Sand	Paul Sanchez	1932–	American actor and comedian	
Kenneth Sandford	Kenneth Parkin	1924–2004	English singer and actor	
Flo Sandon's	Mammola Sandon	1924–2006	Italian singer	
Renee Sands	Renee Sandstrom	Unknown	American singer and actress	
Eva Santamaría	Eva María Delgado Macías	1971–	Spanish singer	
Yūsuke Santamaria	Yuusuke Nakayama	1971–	Japanese actor and singer	
Juelz Santana	LaRon James	1982–	American rapper (The Diplomats)	
Alejandro Sanz	Alejandro Sánchez Pizarro	1968–	Spanish singer, musician and composer	
Alvin Sargent	Alvin Supowitz	1927–2019	American screenwriter	
Dick Sargent	Richard Cox	1930–1994	American actor	
Herb Sargent	Herbert Supowitz	1923–2005	Television writer and producer	
Joseph Sargent	Giuseppe Sorgente	1925–2014	American film director	
Georges Sari	Georgia Sarivaxevani	1925–2012	Greek author and actress	
Laila Sari	Nur Jahrotuljannah	1935–2017	Indonesian comedienne and singer	
I. V. Sasi	Irruppam Sasidaran	1948–2017	Indian film director	
Savitha Sastry	Savitha Subramaniam	1969–	Indian dancer and choreographer	
Lori Saunders	Linda Hines	1941–	American actress	
Doc Sausage	Lucius Antoine Tyson	1911–1972	American singer, dancer, drummer and bandleader	Also known as Dr. Sausage
Ann Savage	Bernice Lyon	1921–2008	American actress	
John Savage	John Youngs	1949–	American actor	
Michael Savage	Michael Weiner	1942–	American political commentator	
Jan Savitt	Jacob Savetnick	1907–1948	American bandleader	
Lady Saw	Marion Hall	1969–	Jamaican singer and songwriter	
Connie Sawyer	Rosie Cohen	1912–2018	American actress	
James Saxon	William Smyth	1955–2003	English character actor	
John Saxon	Carmine Orrico	1936–2020	American actor	
Leo Sayer	Gerard Sayer	1948–	English-Australian singer and songwriter	
Jo Ann Sayers	Miriam Lilygren	1918–2011	American actress	
Rat Scabies	Chris Miller	1955–	English musician (The Damned)	
Delia Scala	Odette Bedogni	1929–2004	Italian actress	
Gia Scala	Giovanna Scoglio	1934–1972	English-American actress	
Nicole Scherzinger	Nicole Valiente	1978–	American singer	
Margarete Schön	Margarete Schippang	1895–1985	German actress	
B. P. Schulberg	Percival Schulberg	1892–1957	American film producer and film studio executive	
Budd Schulberg	Seymour Wilson Schulberg	1914–2009	American screenwriter, television producer, novelist and sports writer	
Chico Science	Francisco França	1966–1997	Brazilian singer and composer	
Tony Scoggo	Anthony Scoggins	1936–2022	English actor	
Big Scoob	Stewart Ashby Jr.	1973–	American rapper	
Fatman Scoop	Isaac Freeman III	1971–2024	American rapper	
Bonnie Scott	Bonnie Paul	1941–	American retired actress and singer	
Clive Scott	Robert Cleghorn	1937–2021	South African actor and director	
Gordon Scott	Gordon Werschkul	1926–2007	American actor	
Jack Scott	Jack Scafone	1936–2019	Canadian-American singer and songwriter	
Josey Scott	Joseph Sappington	1972–	American musician and singer (Saliva)	
Kathryn Leigh Scott	Marlene Kringstad	1943–	American actress	
Killian Scott	Cillian Murphy	1985–	Irish actor	
Linda Scott	Linda Sampson	1945–	American singer and actress	
Lizabeth Scott	Emma Matzo	1922–2015	American actress	
L'Wren Scott	Laura Bambrough	1964–2014	American model	
Randolph Scott	George Crane	1898–1987	American actor	
Ronnie Scott	Ronald Schatt	1927–1996	English jazz musician	
Simon Scott	Daniel Simon	1920–1991	American character actor	
DJ Screw	Robert Earl Davis Jr.	1971–2000	American hip hop DJ (Screwed Up Click)	
Angus Scrimm	Lawrence Scrimm	1926–2016	American actor	
Lisa Seagram	Ruth Browser	1936–2019	American actress	
Jay Sean	Kamaljit Jhooti	1981–	English singer and songwriter	
George Seaton	George Stenius	1911–1979	American screenwriter, playwright and director	
Joan Sebastian	José Manuel Figueroa Sr.	1951–2015	Mexican singer and songwriter	
Red Sebastian	Seppe Guido Yvonne Herreman	1999–	Belgian singer-songwriter	
Blossom Seeley	Minnie Guyer	1886–1974	American singer, dancer and actress	
Sybil Seely	Sybil Travilla	1900–1984	American actress	
Hélène Ségara	Hélène Rizzo	1971–	French singer	
Connie Sellecca	Concetta Sellecchia	1955–	American actress, producer and former model	
Dimitrios Semsis	Dimítrios Koukoudéas	1883–1950	Greek musician	Also known as Dimitrios Salonikios
Riya Sen	Riya Varma	1981–	Indian actress	
Mack Sennett	Michael Sinnott	1880–1960	Canadian-American producer, director, actor and studio head	
Captain Sensible	Ray Burns	1954–	English singer-songwriter and musician (The Damned)	
Johnny Sequoyah	Johnny Friedenberg	2002–	American actress	
MC Serch	Michael Berrin	1967–	American rapper	
Ivan Sergei	Ivan Gaudio	1971–	American actor	
Raymond Serra	Aurelio Lacagnina	1936–2003	American character actor	
Camilo Sesto	Camilo Blanes Cortés	1946–2019	Spanish singer, songwriter and music producer	
Pilar Seurat	Rita Hernandez	1938–2001	Filipina-American actress	
Adam G. Sevani	Adam Manucharian	1992–	American actor and dancer	
Johnny Seven	John Fetto Jr.	1926–2010	American character actor	
Toni Seven	June Millarde	1922–1991	American actress	
Steven Severin	Steven Bailey	1955–	English musician (Siouxsie and the Banshees)	
Ninón Sevilla	Emelia Pérez Castellanos	1921–2015	Cuban-Mexican dancer	
John Sex	John McLoughlin	1956–1990	American cabaret singer and performance artist	
Anne Seymour	Anne Eckert	1909–1988	American actress	
Carolyn Seymour	Carolyn von Beckendorf	1947–	English actress	
Jane Seymour	Joyce Frankenberg	1951–	English actress	
DJ Shadow	Josh Davis	1972–	American DJ and music producer	
Twin Shadow	George Lewis Jr.	1983–	Dominican-American singer, songwriter, musician and actor	
M. Shadows	Matthew Sanders	1981–	American singer and songwriter (Avenged Sevenfold)	
MC Shan	Shawn Moltke	1965–	American rapper (Juice Crew)	
Paul Shane	George Speight	1940–2013	English actor and comedian	
Ravi Shankar	Robindro Chowdhury	1920–2012	Indian musician and composer	
Bob Shannon	Don Bombard	1948–2023	American radio disc jockey	
Del Shannon	Charles Westover	1934–1990	American musician, singer and songwriter	
Peggy Shannon	Winona Sammon	1907–1941	American actress	
Emma Shapplin	Crystêle Joliton	1974–	French opera singer	
John Sharian	John Shahnazarian	1964–	English actor	
Omar Sharif	Michel Yusef Dimitri Chalhoub	1932–2015	Egyptian actor	
Dee Dee Sharp	Dione LaRue	1945–	American singer	
Rocky Sharpe	Robert Podsiadły	1952–2019	English singer (Rocky Sharpe and the Replays)	
Todd Sharpville	Roland Philipps	1970–	English musician	
Artie Shaw	Arthur Arshawsky	1910–2004	American musician and bandleader	
Richard Shaw	Maximilian Shalofsky	1920–2010	English actor	
Rick Shaw	James Hummel	1938–2017	American disc jockey, radio and television personality	
Sandie Shaw	Sandra Goodrich	1947–	English singer	
Susan Shaw	Patricia Sloots	1929–1978	English actress	
Victoria Shaw	Jeanette Elphick	1935–1988	Australian actress	
Wini Shaw	Winifred Momi	1907–1982	American actress, dancer and singer	Also known as Winifred Shaw
Dick Shawn	Richard Schulefand	1923–1987	American actor and comedian	
Dorothy Shay	Dorothy Sims	1921–1978	American singer and character actress	
Konstantin Shayne	Konstantin Olkenitski	1888–1974	Russian-American actor	
Robert Shayne	Robert Shaen Dawe	1900–1992	American actor	
Tamara Shayne	Tamara Olkenitskaya	1902–1983	Russian-American actress	Also known as Tamara Nikoulina
Al Shean	Albert Schönberg	1868–1949	German-American comedian and vaudevillian	
Michael Sheard	Donald Perkins	1938–2005	Scottish character actor	
Moira Shearer	Moira King	1926–2006	Scottish ballet dancer and actress	
Jake Shears	Jason Sellards	1978–	American singer	
Charlie Sheen	Carlos Estévez	1965–	American actor	
Martin Sheen	Ramón Estévez	1940–	American actor	
Johnny Sheffield	John Cassan	1931–2010	American actor	
Reginald Sheffield	Matthew Cassan	1901–1951	English-American actor	
Dean Shek	Wei-cheng Shek	1949–2021	Hong Kong actor and producer	
Charlotte Shelby	Lily Miles	1877–1957	American actress	
Margaret Shelby	Margaret Reilly	1900–1939	American actress	
Doug Sheldon	Bernard Bobrow	1936–	English actor and pop singer	
Paul Shelley	Paul Matthews	1942–	English actor	
Pete Shelley	Peter McNeish	1955–2018	English singer, songwriter and musician (Buzzcocks)	
Shifty Shellshock	Seth Binzer	1974–2024	American rapper (Crazy Town)	
Anne Shelton	Patricia Sibley	1923–1994	English singer	
Jan Shepard	Josephine Sorbello	1928–2025	American actress	
Jon Shepodd	Hugh Goodwin	1927–2017	American actor	
T. G. Sheppard	William Browder	1944–	American country singer-songwriter	
Mark Shera	Mark Shapiro	1949–	American actor	
Dinah Sheridan	Dinah Ginsburg	1920–2012	English actress	
Lee Sheriden	Roger Pritchard	1944–	English singer-songwriter	
Allan Sherman	Allan Copelon	1924–1973	American comedian, actor and singer	
Gale Sherwood	Jacqueline Nash	1929–2017	Canadian singer and actress	
Lydia Sherwood	Lily Shavelson	1906–1989	English actress	
Anne Shirley	Dawn Paris	1918–1993	American actress	Known as Dawn O'Day (as a child)
Natasha Shneider	Natalia Schneiderman	1956–2008	Latvian musician and actress	
Michelle Shocked	Karen Johnston	1962–	American singer-songwriter	
Troy Shondell	Gary Schelton	1939–2016	American singer	
Roberta Shore	Roberta Schourop	1943–	American retired actress	
Too Short	Todd Shaw	1966–	American rapper and record producer (Mount Westmore)	
Ras Shorty I	Garfield Blackman	1941–2000	Trinidadian musician	Also known as Lord Shorty
Trombone Shorty	Troy Andrews	1986–	American musician and producer	
Alexander Siddig	Siddig el-Mahdi	1965–	Sudanese-English actor and director	Also known as Siddig el-Fadil
Frank Sidebottom	Christopher Sievey	1955–2010	English musician and comedian	
Beverly Sills	Belle Silverman	1929–2007	American opera singer	
Paul Sills	Paul Silverberg	1927–2008	American director	
Jenny Silver	Jenny Öhlund	1974–	Swedish singer	
Jay Silverheels	Harold Smith	1912–1980	Canadian actor and athlete	
Phil Silvers	Philip Silversmith	1911–1985	American comedian and actor	
Maria Sílvia	Maria Aguiar	1944–2009	Brazilian actress	
David Simeon	David Townsend	1943–	English actor	
Al Simmons	Aloysius Szymanski	1902–1956	American professional baseball player	
Gene Simmons	Chaim Witz	1949–	Israeli-American musician and singer (Kiss)	Also known as Eugene Klein, The Demon, God of Thunder, Dr. Love and Reginald Van Helsing
Domonique Simone	Deirdre Morrow	1971–	American actress	
Nina Simone	Eunice Waymon	1933–2003	American singer-songwriter	
Renée Simonot	Jeanne Deneuve	1911–2021	French actress	Also known as Renée-Jeanne Simonot
Mickey Simpson	Charles Simpson	1913–1985	American character actor	
Diane Sinclair	Miriam Rosen	1921–2011	American actress	
Madge Sinclair	Madge Walters	1938–1995	Jamaican actress	
Bob Sinclar	Christophe LeFriant	1969–	French record producer and DJ	
Eric Singer	Eric Mensinger	1958–	American drummer (Kiss)	
Penny Singleton	Mariana McNulty	1908–2003	American actress	
Siouxsie Sioux	Susan Ballion	1957–	English singer (Siouxsie and the Banshees)	
Léna Situations	Léna Mahfouf	1997–	French social media personality, author and YouTuber	
Troye Sivan	Troye Mellet	1995–	South African-Australian singer and actor	
Nikki Sixx	Frank Feranna Jr.	1958–	American musician (Mötley Crüe)	
Frank Skinner	Christopher Collins	1957–	English comedian	
Nick Skitz	Nicholas Agamalis	1968–	Australian record producer	
Jennifer Sky	Jennifer Wacha	1976–	American actress	
Rottyful Sky	Kim Hanul	1988–2013	South Korean singer and producer	
Ione Skye	Ione Leitch	1970–	English-American actress	
Acey Slade	Emil Schmidt IV	1974–	American musician (Dope and Murderdolls)	
Chris Slade	Christopher Rees	1946–	Welsh musician (AC/DC)	
Mia Slavenska	Mia Čorak	1916–2002	Croatian-American ballet dancer	
DJ Kay Slay	Keith Grayson	1966–2022	American DJ	
Kimbo Slice	Kevin Ferguson	1974–2016	Bahamian professional boxer and actor	
Earl Slick	Frank Madeloni	1952–	American musician	
Sgt Slick	Andrew James Ramanauskas	Unknown	Australian DJ and producer	Also known as Andy J or L'TRIC
Fatboy Slim	Norman Cook	1963–	English musician (The Housemartins), DJ and producer	
Magic Slim	Morris Holt	1937–2013	American singer and musician	
Memphis Slim	John Chatman	1915–1988	American blues musician, singer and composer	
Mississippi Slim	Carvel Ausborn	1923–1973	American country singer	
Sunnyland Slim	Albert Luandrew	1906–1995	American blues musician	
P. F. Sloan	Philip Schlein	1945–2015	American singer and songwriter	
Lindsay Sloane	Lindsay Leikin	1977–	American actress	
Karl Slover	Karl Kosiczky	1918–2011	Slovak-American actor	
Edward Small	Edward Schmalheiser	1891–1977	American film producer	
Pat Smear	Georg Ruthenberg	1959–	American musician (Germs)	
Yakov Smirnoff	Yakov Pokhis	1951–	Ukrainian-American comedian	
Buffalo Bob Smith	Robert Schmidt	1917–1998	American television personality	
Cal Smith	Calvin Shofner	1932–2013	American country musician and singer	
John Smith	Robert Van Orden	1931–1995	American actor	
Keely Smith	Dorothy Keely	1928–2017	American singer	
Liz Smith	Betty Gleadle	1921–2016	English character actress	
Lois Smith	Lois Humbert	1930–	American character actress	
Margo Smith	Betty Miller	1942–	American country singer-songwriter	
Michael Kelly Smith	Michael Shermick	1958–	American musician (Cinderella and Britny Fox)	
Whispering Jack Smith	Jacob Schmidt	1896–1950	American singer	
CL Smooth	Corey Penn	1968–	American rapper (Pete Rock & CL Smooth)	
J. B. Smoove	Jerry Brooks	1965–	American actor, comedian and writer	
DJ Snake	William Grigahcine	1986–	Algerian-French producer and DJ	
Sam Sneed	Sam Anderson	1968–	American producer and rapper	
Mark Snow	Martin Fulterman	1946–2025	American composer	
Phoebe Snow	Phoebe Laub	1950–2011	American singer-songwriter and musician	
Leigh Snowden	Martha Estes	1929–1982	American actress	
Al Sobrante	John Kiffmeyer	1969–	American retired musician and songwriter (Green Day)	
Chica Sobresalto	Maialen Gurbindo López	1994–	Spanish singer and songwriter	
Vera Sola	Danielle Aykroyd	1989–	American-Canadian singer-songwriter	
MC Solaar	Claude M'Barali	1969–	French rapper	
Pastora Soler	María del Pilar Sánchez Luque	1978–	Spanish singer	
Gordon Solie	Francis Labiak	1929–2000	American professional wrestling announcer	
Alba Solís	Ángela Lamberti	1927–2016	Argentine singer and actress	
Mano Solo	Emmanuel Cabut	1963–2010	French singer	
Sal Solo	Christopher Scott Stevens	1961–	English singer	
Georg Solti	Györg Stern	1912–1997	Hungarian-British conductor	
Brett Somers	Audrey Johnston	1924–2007	Canadian-American actress and singer	
Charlotte Sometimes	Jessica Poland	1988–	American singer-songwriter	
Elke Sommer	Elke Schletz	1940–2026	German actress	
Josef Sommer	Maximilian Sommer	1934–	German-American retired actor	
Grethe Sønck	Grethe Hald	1929–2010	Danish actress and singer	
Trey Songz	Tremaine Neverson	1984–	American singer, songwriter and record producer (Ocean's 7)	
Cahide Sonku	Cahide Serap	1919–1981	Turkish actress, model, writer and director	
Jack Soo	Gorou Suzuki	1917–1979	Japanese-American actor	
Wilbur Soot	Will Patrick Spencer Gold	1996–	English musician, YouTuber and Twitch streamer	Also known as William Patrick Spencer Gold
Louise Sorel	Louise Cohen	1940–	American actress	
Ted Sorel	Theodore Eliopoulos	1936–2010	American actor	
Topi Sorsakoski	Pekka Tammilehto	1952–2011	Finnish singer	
Geneviève Sorya	Geneviève Durand	1912–2008	French actress	
Ann Sothern	Harriette Lake	1909–2001	American actress	
Big Soto	Gustavo Rafael Guerrero Soto	1996–	Venezuelan rapper, singer and composer	
Alain Souchon	Alain Kienast	1944–	French singer-songwriter and actor	
David Soul	David Solberg	1943–2024	American-British actor	
Jimmy Soul	James McCleese	1942–1988	American singer	
Musiq Soulchild	Taalib Hassan Johnson	1977–	American singer and songwriter	Also known as Musiq
Joe South	Joseph Alfred Souter	1940–2012	American singer-songwriter, musician and record producer	
Eve Southern	Elva McDowell	1900–1962	American actress	
Jeri Southern	Genevieve Lillian Hering	1926–1991	American jazz singer and musician	
Lady Sovereign	Louise Amanda Harman	1985–	English rapper	
Kevin Spacey	Kevin Spacey Fowler	1959–	American actor	
Ned Sparks	Edward Arthur Sparkman	1883–1957	Canadian-American actor	
Randy Sparks	Lloyd Arrington Sparks	1933–2024	American musician	
Alex Sparrow	Alexey Vladimirovich Vorobyov	1988–	Russian singer and actor	
Bubba Sparxxx	Warren Anderson Mathis	1977–	American rapper (Dungeon Family)	
Burning Spear	Winston Rodney	1945–	Jamaican singer-songwriter	
Georgina Spelvin	Shelley Bob Graham	1936–	American former pornographic actress	
Bud Spencer	Carlo Pedersoli	1929–2016	Italian actor and professional swimmer	
John Spencer	John Speshock Jr.	1946–2005	American actor	
Silver Sphere	Sophie Cates	1999–	American singer-songwriter	
Baby Spice	Emma Bunton	1976–	English singer, songwriter, actress and media personality	
Ginger Spice	Geraldine Halliwell	1972–	English singer, songwriter, author and actress	
Posh Spice	Victoria Beckham	1974–	English singer and television personality	
Dave Spikey	David Bramwell	1951–	English comedian and television presenter	
DJ Spinderella	Deirdra Roper	1970–	American rapper (Salt-N-Pepa)	
Joe Spinell	Joseph Spagnuolo	1936–1989	American character actor	
Anthony Spinelli	Samuel Weinstein	1927–2000	American actor and producer	
Dusty Springfield	Mary O'Brien	1939–1999	English singer	
Rick Springfield	Richard Springthorpe	1949–	Australian singer-songwriter and actor	
Tom Springfield	Dionysius Patrick O'Brien	1934–2022	English musician, songwriter and record producer	
James Stacy	Maurice Elias	1936–2016	American actor	
John M. Stahl	Jacob Strelitsky	1886–1950	American film director and producer	
Bern Nadette Stanis	Bernadette Stanislaus	1953–	American actress and author	Also known/billed as BernNadette Stanis, Bernadette Stanis and Bern Nadette
Florence Stanley	Florence Schwartz	1924–2003	American actress	
Kim Stanley	Patricia Reid	1925–2001	American actress	
Louise Stanley	Louise Keyes	1915–1982	American actress	
Paul Stanley	Stanley Eisen	1952–	American singer and musician (Kiss)	
Barbara Stanwyck	Ruby Stevens	1907–1990	American actress	
Scott Stapp	Anthony Scott Flippen	1973–	American singer and songwriter (Creed)	
Hovi Star	Hovav Sekulets	1986–	Israeli singer	
Ryan Star	Ryan Kulchinsky	1978–	American singer-songwriter	
Alvin Stardust	Bernard Jewry	1942–2014	English singer and actor	Also known as Shane Fenton
Ayra Starr	Oyinkansola Aderibigbe	2002–	Nigerian singer and songwriter	
Belle Starr	Myra Shirley	1848–1889	American outlaw	
Blaze Starr	Fannie Fleming	1932–2015	American model	
Brenda K. Starr	Brenda Kaplan	1966–	American singer and songwriter	
Edwin Starr	Charles Hatcher	1942–2003	American singer and songwriter	
Fredro Starr	Fred Scruggs	1971–	American rapper and actor (Onyx)	
Jane Starr	Garnette Ryman	1906–2002	American actress	
Kay Starr	Katherine Starks	1922–2016	American singer	
Martin Starr	Martin Schienle	1982–	American actor and comedian	
Randy Starr	Warren Nadel	1930–	American singer-songwriter	
Ringo Starr	Richard Starkey	1940–	English musician and singer (The Beatles)	
Sally Starr	Alleen Beller	1923–2013	American television personality	
Lovebug Starski	Kevin Smith	1960–2018	American rapper, musician and record producer	
Athena Starwoman	Athena Demartini	1945–2004	Australian media astrologer and columnist	Also known internationally as Miss Starwoman
Wayne Static	Wayne Wells	1965–2014	American musician and singer (Static-X)	
J.A. Steel	Jacquelyn Ruffner	1969–	American writer, director and producer	
Bob Steele	Robert Bradbury	1907–1988	American actor	
Michael Steele	Susan Thomas	1955–	American musician (The Bangles)	Known as Micki Steele during her early career
Peter Steele	Peter Ratajczyk	1962–2010	American musician, singer and songwriter (Type O Negative)	
Tommy Steele	Thomas Hicks	1936–	English singer and actor	
Indira Stefanianna	Indira Christopherson	1946–	American voice actress and singer	Also credited as Indira Danks and Stefanianna Christopherson
Henry Stephenson	Henry Garroway	1871–1956	British actor	
Ford Sterling	George Stitch	1883–1939	American comedian and actor	
Jan Sterling	Jane Adriance	1921–2004	American actress	
Robert Sterling	William Hart	1917–2006	American actor	
Gordon Sterne	Gerhard Stern	1923–2017	German actor	
Delicate Steve	Steve Marion	Unknown	American musician	
Andrew Stevens	Herman Stephens	1955–	American actor and producer	
April Stevens	Caroline LoTempio	1929–2023	American singer (Nino Tempo & April Stevens)	
Brody Stevens	Steven Brody	1970–2019	American comedian	
Cat Stevens	Steven Demetre Georgiou	1948–	English singer-songwriter and musician	Primarily known as Yusuf Islam
Connie Stevens	Concetta Ingolia	1938–	American actress and singer	
Craig Stevens	Gail Shikles Jr.	1918–2000	American actor	
Dodie Stevens	Geraldine Pasquale	1946–	American singer	
Fisher Stevens	Stephen Fisher	1963–	American actor, director, producer and writer	
Inger Stevens	Inger Stensland	1934–1970	Swedish-American actress	
K. T. Stevens	Gloria Wood	1919–1994	American actress	
Onslow Stevens	Onslow Stevenson	1902–1977	American actor	
Ray Stevens	Harold Ragsdale	1939–	American musician, singer and comedian	
Risë Stevens	Risë Steenberg	1913–2013	American opera singer and actress	
Shadoe Stevens	Terry Ingstad	1947–	American radio host	
Shakin' Stevens	Michael Barrett	1948–	Welsh singer and songwriter	
Steve Stevens	Steven Schneider	1959–	American musician	
Tabitha Stevens	Kelly Garrett	1970–	American pornographic actress	
Elaine Stewart	Elsy Steinberg	1930–2011	American actress	
JC Stewart	John Callum Stewart	1997–	Northern Irish singer-songwriter	Also known as Callum Stewart
Jon Stewart	Jonathan Leibowitz	1962–	American comedian, actor and television host	
Martha Stewart	Martha Haworth	1922–2021	American actress	
Michael Stewart	Myron Rubin	1924–1987	American playwright and dramatist	
Paula Stewart	Dorothy Zürndorfer	1929–	American actress	
Cool Sticky	Uzaiah Thompson	1936–2014	Jamaican musician and singer	
Vinnie Stigma	Vincent Cappucchio	1955–	American musician (Agnostic Front)	
John Stockwell	John Stockwell Samuels IV	1961–	American actor	
Ali Stone	Alicia Gómez	1992–	Colombian record producer, multi-instrumentalist, singer-songwriter, engineer and DJ	
Christopher Stone	Thomas Bourassa	1940–1995	American actor	
Cliffie Stone	Clifford Snyder	1917–1998	American country singer, musician and record producer	
Freddie Stone	Frederick Stewart	1947–	American musician (Sly and the Family Stone)	
Harold J. Stone	Harold Hochstein	1913–2005	American character actor	
Jeffrey Stone	John Fontaine	1926–2012	American actor	
John Stone	John Hailstone	1924–2007	Welsh actor	
Joss Stone	Joscelyn Stocker	1987–	English singer	
Lew Stone	Louis Steinberg	1898–1969	English bandleader and arranger	
Philip Stone	Philip Stones	1924–2003	English actor	
Rose Stone	Rosemary Stewart	1945–	American singer and musician (Sly and the Family Stone)	
Sly Stone	Sylvester Stewart	1943–2025	American musician, songwriter and record producer (Sly and the Family Stone)	
Stuart Stone	Stuart Eisenstein	1980–	Canadian actor	
Vet Stone	Vaetta Stewart	1950–	American soul singer (Sly and the Family Stone)	
Gale Storm	Josephine Cottle	1922–2009	American actress and singer	
Hannah Storm	Hannah Storen	1962–	American sports journalist	
Rory Storm	Alan Caldwell	1938–1972	English musician and singer	
Tempest Storm	Annie Banks	1928–2021	American dancer and actress	
Peter Stormare	Rolf Storm	1953–	Swedish actor	
Suzanne Storrs	Suzanne Poulton	1934–1995	American actress	
Izzy Stradlin	Jeffrey Isbell	1962–	American musician, singer and songwriter (Guns N' Roses)	
Elsa Stralia	Elsie Fischer	1881–1945	Australian opera singer	
Steve Strange	Steven Harrington	1959–2015	Welsh singer	
Mumzy Stranger	Muhammad Ahmed	1984–	English rapper, singer, songwriter and record producer	
Teresa Stratas	Anastasia Stratakis	1938–	Canadian opera singer	
Melissa Stribling	Melissa Smith	1926–1992	Scottish actress	
Freddie Stroma	Frederic Sjöström	1987–	English actor and model	
Mark Strong	Marco Salussolia	1963–	English actor	
Joe Strummer	John Mellor	1952–2003	English singer-songwriter and musician (The Clash)	
Jud Strunk	Justin Strunk Jr.	1936–1981	American singer-songwriter and comedian	
Jeff Stryker	Charles Casper Peyton	1962–	American pornographic actor	
Barbara Stuart	Barbara McNeese	1930–2011	American actress	
Conny Stuart	Cornelia van Meijgaard	1913–2010	Dutch actress and singer	
Gloria Stuart	Gloria Stewart	1910–2010	American actress	
Iris Stuart	Frances McCann	1903–1936	American actress	
Jeanne Stuart	Ivy Sweet	1908–2003	English actress	
Maxine Stuart	Maxine Shlivek	1918–2013	American actress	
Mel Stuart	Stuart Solomon	1928–2012	American film director and producer	
Nick Stuart	Niculae Pratza	1904–1973	Austro-Hungarian-born American actor and bandleader	
Randy Stuart	Elizabeth Shaubell	1924–1996	American actress	
Levi Stubbs	Levi Stubbles	1936–2008	American singer (Four Tops)	
Marie Studholme	Caroline Lupton	1872–1930	English actress and singer	
Preston Sturges	Edmund Biden	1898–1959	American playwright, screenwriter and film director	
Peter Sturm	Josef Dischel	1909–1984	Austrian-German actor	
Re Styles	Shirley Macleod	1950–2022	American singer, designer and actor	
Shyla Stylez	Amanda Friedland	1982–2017	Canadian pornographic actress	
Poly Styrene	Marianne Elliott-Said	1957–2011	English musician and singer-songwriter (X-Ray Spex)	
Vi Subversa	Frances Sokolov	1935–2016	English singer and musician (Poison Girls)	
Nikki Sudden	Adrian Nicholas Godfrey	1956–2006	English singer-songwriter and musician (Swell Maps)	
Big Jim Sullivan	James George Tomkins	1941–2012	English musician	
Grant Sullivan	Jerry Schulz	1924–2011	American actor	
Madame Sul-Te-Wan	Nellie Crawford	1873–1959	American actress	
Yma Sumac	Zoila Emperatriz Chávarri Castillo	1922–2008	Peruvian-American singer, model and actress	
Kabir Suman	Suman Chattopadhyay	1949–	Indian music director, songwriter, singer and composer	
Marc Summers	Marc Berkowitz	1951–	American television personality, comedian and actor	
Paige Summers	Nancy Ann Coursey	1976–2003	American model	
Daniel Sunjata	Daniel Sunjata Condon	1971–	American actor	
Tommie Sunshine	Thomas John Norello	1971–	American record producer and DJ	
Princess Superstar	Concetta Suzanne Kirschner	1971–	American rapper and DJ	
S. J. Suryah	Selvaraj Justin Pandian	1968–	Indian director, screenwriter, actor, composer and producer	
Dick Sutherland	Archibald Thomas Johnson	1881–1934	American actor	
Dolores Sutton	Dolores Lila Silverstein	1927–2009	American actress	
James Sutton	James Cook	1983–	English actor	
Bettye Swann	Betty Jean Champion	1944–	American soul singer	Also known as Betty Barton
Earl Sweatshirt	Thebe Neruda Kgositsile	1994–	American rapper, singer, songwriter and record producer	Originally known as Sly Tendencies
Puma Swede	Johanna Jussinniemi	1976–	Swedish pornographic actress	
Allen Swift	Ira Stadlen	1924–2010	American voice actor	
Teddy Swims	Jaten Collin Dimsdale	1992–	American singer-songwriter	
DeVante Swing	Donald Earle DeGrate Jr.	1969–	American record producer, singer, rapper and songwriter	
Loretta Swit	Loretta Jane Szwed	1937–2025	American actress	
Tom Swoon	Dorian Kamil Tomasiak	1993–	Polish former DJ and record producer	Previously known as Pixel Cheese
La Sylphe	Edith Lambelle Langerfeld	1883–1968	American dancer	
Sylvain Sylvain	Sylvain Mizrahi	1951–2021	American musician	
David Sylvian	David Alan Batt	1958–	English musician, singer and songwriter (Japan)	
Sylvia Syms	Sylvia Blagman	1917–1992	American singer	
