= Jimmy Butts =

American jazz musician

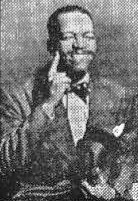
Jimmy Butts, c. 1945

Jimmy Butts (September 24, 1917 – January 8, 1998) was an American jazz double-bassist.

Early in his career Butts played with local groups Dr. Sausage and His Pork Chops and Daisy Mae's Hepcats. Early in the 1940s he played in the orchestras of Les Hite and Chris Columbus. He accompanied Frances Brock on USO tours during World War II, and also played with Don Redman, Art Hodes, Lem Johnson, Tiny Grimes, and Noble Sissle in the 1940s. Late in the decade he played in a duo with Doles Dickens and had his own ensemble, continuing with it into the early 1950s.

In the 1960s Butts emigrated to Canada, where he played with Juanita Smith. In the 1970s he returned to New York City and played with his own small group, working almost up until his death. His band remained together under the name Friends of Jimmy Butts after his death.
