= Regal Theater =

Regal Theater or Regal Theatre may refer to:

== Australia ==
- Regal Theatre, Adelaide, South Australia
- Regal Theatre, Perth, Western Australia

== United States ==
- New Regal Theater, Chicago
- Regal Theater, Chicago

== Other countries ==
- Regal Theatre, New Delhi, India

== See also ==
- Regal Entertainment Group
- Regal Cinema (disambiguation)
- Regal (disambiguation)
- Regent Theatre (disambiguation)
