= Dr. Horse =

Dr. Horse was the stage name of Alvergous Pittman (17 September 1917 – 28 April 2004), known as Al Pittman, an American rhythm and blues vocalist and entertainer who performed between the 1930s and 1960s.

Al Pittman was born in Vinnia, Georgia, and first performed in New York City in the 1930s as a dancer and a member of Doc Sausage's musical comedy group, the Five Pork Chops. However, he did not record until 1961, when he released "I'm Tired Of It" on the Fire label owned by Bobby Robinson. His second record, "Jack, That Cat Was Clean", is the one for which he is best known. Produced by Robinson and Marshall Sehorn, Dr. Horse delivered a jive monologue about "a tall handsome guy", Bobo, who "really knows how to dress" and had "two $50,000 rings, and he wore one on each hand... The chicks used to scream when Bobo walked in the door". The backing musicians included Red Prysock (tenor saxophone) and Billy Butler (guitar). The track has been included on several compilation albums, including Early Rappers: Hipper Than Hop - The Ancestors of Rap. Dr. Horse also recorded a straight blues album, Blues Ain't Nothin' But A Good Man Feelin' Bad, with Sammy Price and His Bluesicians, recorded in New York in 1961 and released by Kapp Records in 1962.

He died in 2004, at the age of 86.
