= List of cinemas in Delhi =

Cinema has always been one of the most popular forms of entertainment in the city of Delhi, India. Therefore, movie theatres are major entertainment venues in the city, and have been prominent in the nation's movie theatre industry. In recent years Delhi's many single-screen cinema halls have been giving way to large multiplexes.

== History ==
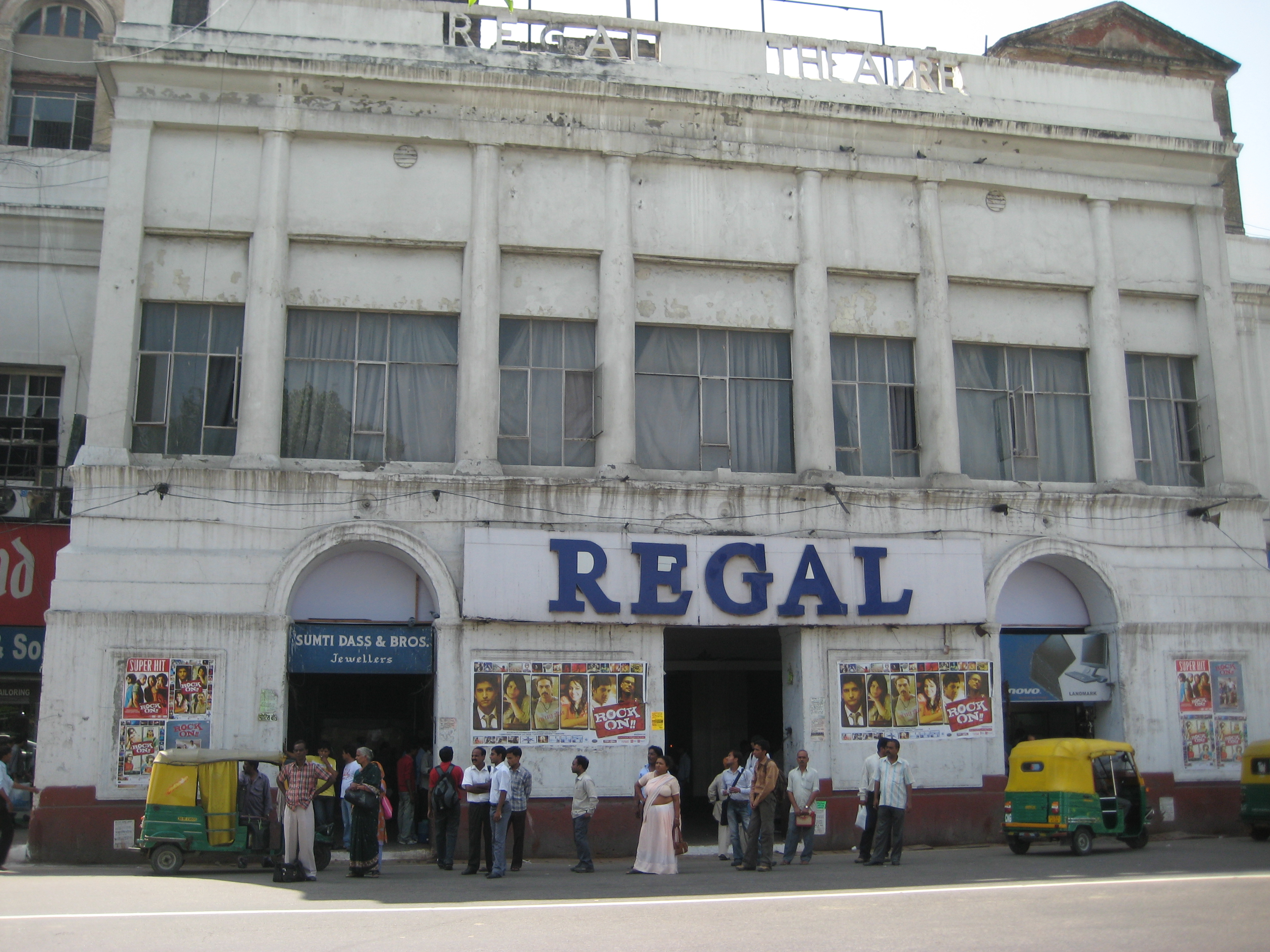
Regal Cinema 85 Years old Movie theatre

Regal single-screen movie theatre this is oldest movie theatre of delhi. it was started in 1932 and This movie theater in 2017 permanently closed. It's going to be started very soon as Cinepolis Regal Cinema.

== Single-screen theatres ==
Cinema	Location	Ref.
Supreme Cinema	Shahdara	Closed
Samrat Cinema	Shakurpur	Closed
Sapna Cinema	East of Kailash	Closed
Seble Cinema	Badarpur	Closed
Shiela Cinema	Paharganj	Partially open
Lokesh Cinema	Nangloi	Closed
Moti Cinema	Chandni Chowk	Closed
Milan Cinema	Moti Nagar	Closed (Only Parking space available)
Gagan Cinema	Nand Nagri	Operational
Ritz Cinema	Kashmere Gate	Closed
Golcha Cinema	Daryaganj	Closed
Hans Cinema	Azadpur	Closed
Imperial Cinema	Paharganj	Selected Screenings Only
Kala Mandir Cinema	Mangolpuri	Selected Screenings only
Liberty Cinema	Karol Bagh	Operational
Deilte Main & Delite Dimond Cinema	Asaf Ali Road	Operational
Aakash Cinema	Azadpur	Closed
Abhishek Cineplex	Chandni Chowk	Closed
Amba Cinema	Shakti Nagar	Operational
Batra Cinema	Mukherjee Nagar	Closed
Batra Reels Cinema	New Friends Colony	Operational
Virat Cinema	Dr Ambedkar Nagar	Closed

== Multiplexes ==
Cinema	Location	Ref.
PVR INOX	PVR Vikaspuri	
PVR INOX	PVR Vegas LUXE, Dwarka	
PVR INOX	PVR Vegas, Dwarka	
PVR INOX	PVR Shalimar Bagh	
PVR INOX	PVR Select City Walk, Saket	
PVR INOX	PVR Select City Walk (Gold), Saket	
PVR INOX	PVR Sangam, R.K. Puram	
PVR INOX	PVR Rivoli, CP	
PVR INOX	PVR Priya, Vasant Vihar	
PVR INOX	PVR Prashant Vihar	
PVR INOX	PVR Plaza CP	
PVR INOX	PVR Pacific, Subhash Nagar	
PVR INOX	PVR Pacific D21, Dwarka	
PVR INOX	PVR Naraina	
PVR INOX	PVR ECX Chanakyapuri	
PVR INOX	PVR 3CS Lajpat Nagar	
PVR INOX	PVR Promenade, Vasant Kunj	
PVR INOX	PVR Ambience Directer's cut, Vasant Kunj	
PVR INOX	INOX Shadipur	
PVR INOX	INOX Nehru Place	
PVR INOX	INOX District Centre, Janakpuri	
PVR INOX	INOX Insignia, RCube Monad, Raja Garden	
PVR INOX	INOX Vishal, Raja Garden	
PVR INOX	INOX Pacific, Jasola	
PVR INOX	INOX Insignia, Nehru Place	
PVR INOX	INOX Eros One, Jangpura	
Cinépolis	Cross River Mall, Shahdara	
Cinépolis	V3S Mall, Laxmi Nagar	
Cinépolis	Unity One Mall, Rohini	
Cinépolis	Pacific NSP, Pitampura	
Cinépolis	Fun Cinemas, Moti Nagar	
Cinépolis	Janak Cinema, Janakpuri	
Cinépolis	Savitri Cinema GK II	
Cinépolis	DLF Avenue, Saket	
Movietime	Pitampura	
G3S	Rohini	
Miraj Cinemas	Vikas Mall, Shahdara	
Miraj Cinemas	Subhash Nagar	
Miraj Cinemas	Trilokpuri	
Miraj Cinemas	Azadpur	
M2K Cinemas	Rohini	
M2K Cinemas	Pitampura	
Wave Cinemas	Raja Garden	

== 4DX, IMAX, ICE and Screen X ==
=== 4DX Screens ===
Cinema	Location	Ref.
PVR	ECX, DLF Mall, Delhi	
PVR	Vegas, Dwarka	
PVR	Pacific, Subhash Nagar	
Cinépolis	DLF Avenue, Saket	

=== IMAX Screens ===
Cinema	Location	Ref.
PVR INOX	Select City Walk, Saket	
PVR INOX	Vegas, Dwarka	
PVR INOX	Priya Cinema, Vasant Vihar	
PVR INOX	Vishal Cinema, Raja Garden	
PVR INOX	Paras Cinema, Nehru Place	

=== ICE Screens ===
Cinema	Location	Ref.
PVR	DLF Promenade, Vasant Kunj	

=== Screen X ===
Cinema	Location	Ref.
INOX	Pacific, Jasola	

== See also ==
- Cinema in Kolkata
