= Regal Records =

Regal Records may refer to:

- Regal Records (1914), a British record label
- Regal Records (1920), a Spanish record label
- Regal Records (1921), a United States company
- Regal Records (1949), a United States company
- Regal Records (Canada), a Canadian subsidiary of Capitol Records
- Regal Zonophone Records, a British record label

== See also ==
- Regal (disambiguation)
