= Doc Sausage =

American singer

- Also known as: Dr. Sausage
- Born: Lucius Antoine Tyson; March 7, 1911; Brunswick, Georgia, United States
- Died: September 1972 (aged 61) New York City, U.S.
- Genres: Rhythm and blues, jump blues
- Occupations: Singer, dancer, drummer, bandleader
- Years active: c.1938–1960s

Lucius Antoine Tyson (7 March 1911 – September 1972), who performed as Dr. Sausage or Doc Sausage, was an American singer, dancer, drummer and bandleader. He was active from the 1930s to the 1950s and is best known for his 1950 recording of "Rag Mop".

== Career ==
He was born in Brunswick, Georgia, and moved to New York City in 1936. By 1938, he was performing with his group, Dr. Sausage and His Five Pork Chops. Regarded as a novelty act, the group included Al "Dr. Horse" Pittman. His pianist Jimmy Harris was killed in a car crash that year, but the following year the group performed as a "specialty" feature in a revue, Lew Leslie's Blackbirds of 1939, at the Hudson Theatre. Their act was influenced by performers such as Cab Calloway, and contained comedy, swing jazz, and vocal harmonies. The group first recorded for Decca Records in 1940, on a version of "Wham (Re-bop-boom-bam)" featuring Gerry "The Wig" Wiggins on piano. However, neither it nor other tracks for Decca were commercially successful.

Tyson did not record again until 1950, when his new group, Doc Sausage and His Mad Lads, recorded for the Regal label. As well as Doc Sausage on vocals and drums, the group comprised Earl Johnson (tenor saxophone), Charles Harris (piano), Charlie Jackson (guitar), and Jimmy Butts (bass). The group recorded eight tracks, including a version of "Rag Mop" which reached number 4 in the Billboard R&B chart, and its follow-up, "Sausage Rock". The record company went out of business soon afterwards, and Tyson seems not to have recorded again.

Tyson died in New York in 1972 at the age of 61.

== Selected discography ==
=== Singles ===
Doc Sausage and His Five Pork Chops

- Decca DE 7736

Recorded March 19, 1940, New York City
Gerry "The Wig" Wiggins (piano), Lucius Tyle (drums), (rest of the performers unknown)

1. Side A (67347 matrix): "Wham" ("Re-Bop-Boom-Bam") (© 1939) (ensemble, vocalists)
  By Taps Miller (né Marion Joseph Miller; born 22 July 1915 Indianapolis) (w&m)
  By Eddie Durham (w&m)
  (audio on YouTube)
  (audio on YouTube)
  OCLC 182933147, 78164514
2. Side B (67349 matrix): "Doctor Sausage's Blues" (Tyson, vocalist)
  By Lucius Tyson (w&m)
  (audio on YouTube)
  OCLC 80133783
- Decca DE 7776

Recorded March 19, 1940, New York City

3. Side A (67346 matrix): "Cuckoo Cuckoo Chicken Rhythm" (ensemble, vocalists)
  By Lucius Tyson (w&m)
  (audio on YouTube)
4. Side B (67348 matrix): "Birthday Party" (ensemble, vocalists)
  (audio on YouTube)

Doc Sausage and his Mad Lads

- Regal 3248 (1950)
5. Side A (1120 matrix): "She Don't Want Me No More"
  By Lucius Tyson (w&m)
6. Side B (1121 matrix): "Please Don't Leave Me Now"
  By Lucius Tyson (w&m)
- Regal 3251

Recorded 1950
Earl Johnson (tenor sax), Charles Harris (piano), Charlie Jackson (guitar), and Jimmy Butts (bass)

7. Side A (1141 matrix): "Rag Mop" (© 1950)
  By Johnnie Lee Wills & Deacon Anderson (1925–2011) (w&m)
  (audio on YouTube)
  OCLC 794114382, 81417351
8. Side B (1142 matrix): "You Got Me Cryin'" (© 1950)
  By Howard Biggs & Fred Madison (1917–2000) (w&m)
  (audio on YouTube)
  OCLC 81134247
- Regal 3256

Recorded February 1, 1950, Linden, New Jersey
Earl Johnson (tenor sax), Charles Harris (piano), Charlie Jackson (guitar), Doc Sausage (drums)

9. Side A (1144 matrix): "Sausage Rock" (© 1950)
  By Lucius Tyson (w&m)
10. Side B (1143 matrix): "I've Been a Bad Boy" (© 1950)
  By Lucius Tyson (w&m)

Doc Sausage

- Regal 3283 (78 rpm) (1949)
11. Side A (1122 matrix): "Poor Man's Blues"
  By Lucius Tyson (w&m)
  (audio on www.rapidmediafire.com)
  OCLC 81021965
12. Side B (1119 matrix): "Doormat Blues"
  By Lucius Tyson (w&m)
  (audio on www.rapidmediafire.com)
  OCLC 81526977

=== Compilations ===
Doc Sausage and His Five Pork Chops

- Blue Moon Records, Barcelona CD (1996); OCLC 720664403
1. The Complete Recordings 1946–1949: Luke Jones & Doctor Sausage
  (67346 matrix): "Cuckoo Cuckoo Chicken Rhythm," DE 7776
  (67347 matrix): "Wham" ("Re-Bop-Boom-Bam"), DE 7736
  (67348 matrix): "Birthday Party," DE 7776
  (67349 matrix): "Doctor Sausage's Blues," DE 7736

Doc Sausage and his Mad Lads

- Blue Moon Records, Barcelona, BM-6012 (1995)

Blue Moon Records, Barcelona, BMCD-6004 (CD)
OCLC 720669437, 431376428

2. The Complete Recordings 1940–1953: Lem Johnson, Doc Sausage & Jo Jo Jackson
  (1119 matrix): "Door Mat Blues," RE 3283
  (1120 matrix): "She Don't Want Me No More," RE 3248
  (1121 matrix): "Please Don't Leave Me Now," RE 3248 (1122 matrix): "Poor Man's Blues" ("I'm A Poor Man") RE 3283
  (1141 matrix): "Rag Mop," RE 3251
  (1142 matrix): "You Got Me Cryin'," RE 3251
  (1143 matrix): "I've Been a Bad Boy," RE 3256
  (1144 matrix): "Sausage Rock," RE 3256
- Jewel Records, San Rafael, California, JR-0199 (1999)

OCLC 61717178

3. The Swing Session
  (1144 matrix): "Sausage Rock," RE 3256
- P-Vine Special, Tokyo, PLP-9037 (1981)

OCLC 62410188

4. Sax Blowers & Honkers
  (1144 matrix): "Sausage Rock," RE 3256
- Proper Records, P1341–P1344 (2003)

OCLC 54535486, 939151547

5. The Big Horn: The History of the Honkin' & Screamin' Saxophone
  (1144 matrix): "Sausage Rock," RE 3256
- Proper Records Properbox 61 (2003)

OCLC 55637857

6. The Big Horn: Boogie's The Thing
  (1144 matrix): "Sausage Rock," RE 3256
- Delmark DL-438, DD-438 (CD)

OCLC 27869922

7. Honkers & Bar Walkers (Vol. 1 of 3)
  (1144 matrix): "Sausage Rock," RE 3256
- Hoy Hoy Records (1992)

OCLC 28744533

8. The Rocking 40's
  (1144 matrix): "Sausage Rock," RE 3256
- Hoy Hoy Records (1993)

OCLC 31050849

9. Rock Before Elvis, Before Little Richard, Before Chuck Berry, Bo Diddley or Bill Haley
  (1144 matrix): "Sausage Rock," RE 3256
- Bear Family Records (2005)

OCLC 826851432, 780201535

10. Blowing the Fuse: 28 (29) R&B Classics That Rocked the Jukebox in 1950
  (1141 matrix): "Rag Mop" RE 3251
- Stash Records STB 2516/17 (CD) (1995)

OCLC 34508807

11. The Hoy Hoy Collection: Rock Before Elvis
  (1144 matrix): "Sausage Rock," RE 3256
  Track 13, Disc 1 of 2
- Großer & Stein GmbH, Pforzheim, 223237-354 (2005)

Membran International GmbH
OCLC 255144311

12. Rhythm 'n' Blues: Nasty (Disc 1 of 4)
  (1144 matrix): "Sausage Rock," RE 3256
