= Regal Records (1949) =

American record label; founded in 1949 in Linden, New Jersey

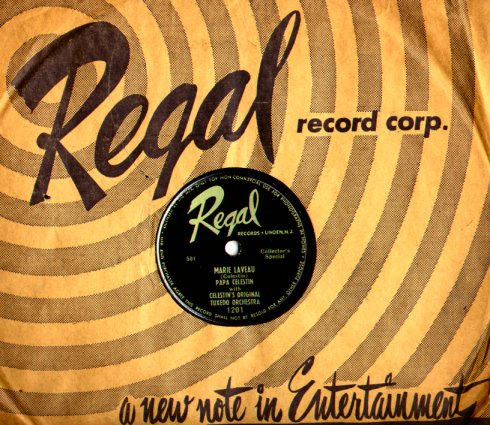
- Fourth USA Regal Records, c. 1950
- Founded: 1949
- Country of origin: United States

Regal Records was an American record label that issued popular music and jazz in the years after World War II. The label's headquarters were in Linden, New Jersey. This label was founded by David and Jules Braun, the founders of De Luxe Records, in 1949; it has no relation to the British, Spanish, or American versions from the 1920s. In the United States, there were also short-lived labels by this name based in California (1947–1949) and Michigan (1947), but these are unrelated to the Linden organization. This label also issued R&B and gospel music. A subsidiary called Tots and Teens issued children's records.

Regal's catalogue included Alberta Hunter and Cab Calloway.

== See also ==
- List of record labels
- Regal Records (disambiguation)
