= Regal Manufacturing Company =

A number of different companies have used the name Regal Manufacturing Company.

- The Regal Manufacturing Company, formerly Emil Wulschner & Son, was a manufacturer of fretted musical instruments in Indianapolis from 1901 to 1904
- The current Regal Manufacturing Company was established to manufacture brushes in 1934. Their current headquarters are in Fond du Lac, Wisconsin

Companies by that name also manufacture:

- Bar stools
- Covered elastic textiles

== See also ==
- Regal Musical Instrument Company
- Regal Seating Company
