= Regal Records (1920) =

Spanish record label from the late 1920s

- Spanish Regal Record
- Parent company: Columbia Records
- Founded: 1921
- Defunct: 1932
- Genre: Various
- Country of origin: United States

Regal Records was a Spanish record label from the late 1920s, which was linked to USA Columbia Records.

== See also ==
- List of record labels
- Regal Records (disambiguation)
