= Regent Theatre, Wollongong =

Regent Theatre
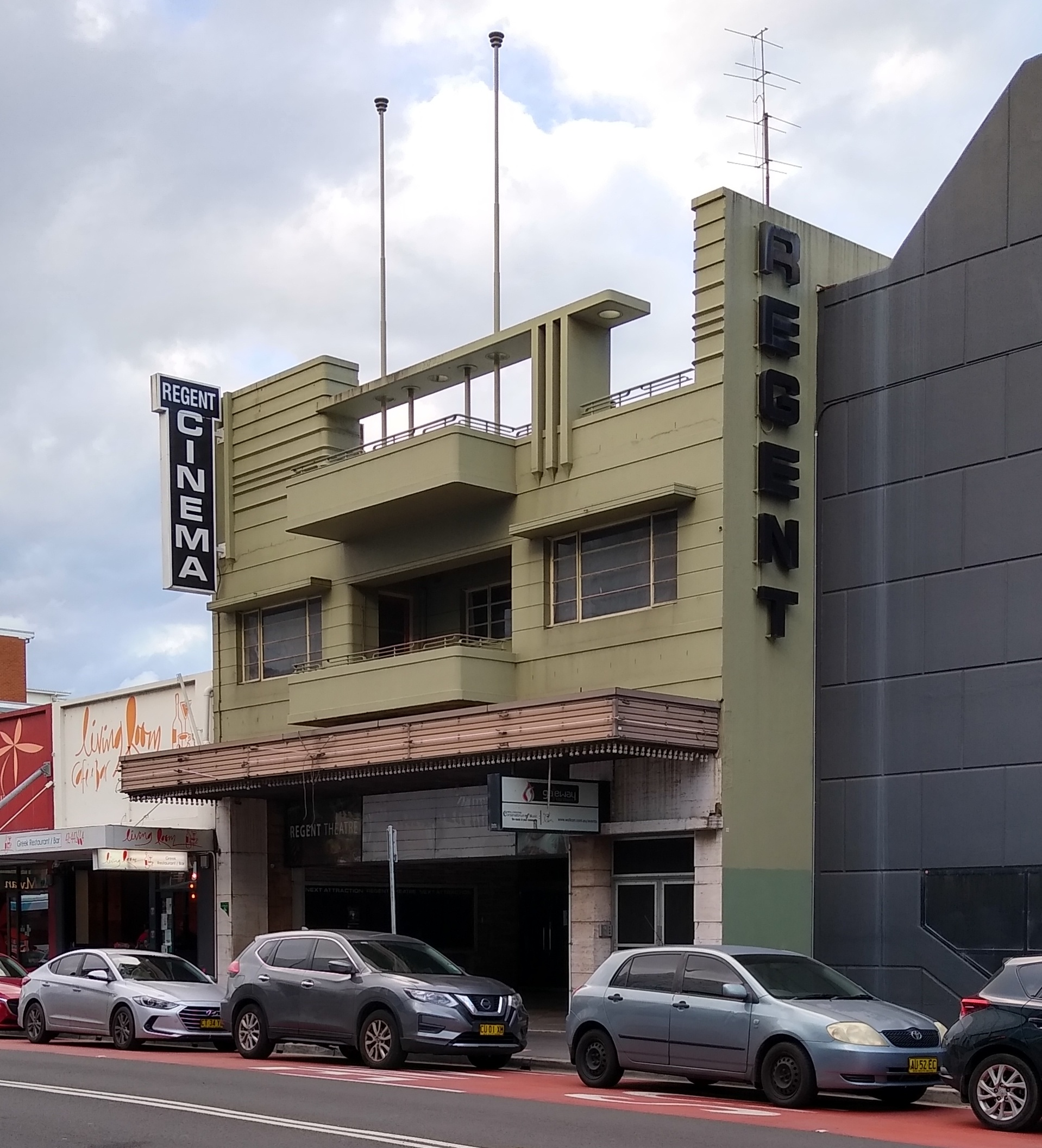

- Location within New South Wales Location within Australia
- 34.4242°S 150.8938°E
- Location: 197 Keira Street, Wollongong, City of Wollongong, New South Wales, Australia

History
- Built: 1950–1954

Site notes
- Architect: Reginald J. Magoffin Interior by Marion Hall Best
- Owner: Apostolic Church Australia

New South Wales Heritage Register
- Official name: Regent Theatre
- Type: state heritage (built)
- Designated: 9 May 2005
- Reference no.: 1735
- Type: Cinema
- Category: Recreation and Entertainment
- Builders: Unknown

Regent Theatre is a heritage-listed former theatre and cinema at 197 Keira Street, Wollongong, City of Wollongong, New South Wales, Australia. It was designed by Reginald J. Magoffin with an interior by Marion Hall Best and built from 1950 to 1954. It was added to the New South Wales State Heritage Register on 9 May 2005.

== History ==
=== Herbert Wyndham Jones and Maurice Jones ===
Herbert Wyndham Jones was an important pioneer of the film exhibition industry in the Illawarra Region. Originally a storekeeper, he turned entrepreneur and by October 1930 he was leasing the Princess Theatre at Corrimal, a former boxing stadium. The Great Depression was having a major impact on the people in the Illawarra and the theatre was functioning as a Relief Centre. Jones undertook extensive repairs to the theatre in 1931 at great expense and it is concluded that "there may have been an element of civic duty in providing further opportunities for the growing numbers of unemployed to enjoy the escapism of the movies". Contrary to prevailing trends, Jones re-opened the theatre as a silent movie house but by September 1931 talkies were introduced. In mid 1931 Jones purchased the Princess Theatre for the sum of 1,400 pounds. The theatre remained in the Jones Family hands for forty-one years of its fifty-nine year life and was destroyed by fire in September 1971.

In 1933, Herbert Jones came to the rescue of the Balgownie School of Arts Committee which had faced an increasingly difficult time during the Great Depression and re-commenced film screenings in September 1933. The hall survives to the present day but film screenings ceased in April 1960.

In the early 1940s Jones commenced a regular 16mm picture show in the Miners' Reading Room in Kembla Heights and on Herbert's death in March 1943 his son Maurice continued the screenings until April 1950.

In 1938 Herbert Jones submitted a successful bid for a seven year lease for the showing of pictures at Wollongong Council's Town Hall Theatre and Council proceeded with renovations and improvements to the building designed by Crick and Furse in association with Mr & Mrs Jones.

Delays with the licensing of the theatre postponed its re-opening till October 1939. Jones introduced a number of innovations at this time - "deaf aids", emphasis on the screening of Australian productions and a preparedness to pay higher rental fees for premium films and to introduce daily matinees and extended seasons. Following his death, Herbert Jones' wife continued as the licensee of the Town Hall (Civic Theatre) until its closure in 1964.

Other innovations and technological advancements introduced by the Jones Family at the Civic Theatre were the installation of a new Western Electric sound system in 1951, the introduction of foreign-language films to the district commencing with La Ronde in 1953 and the VistaVision process in 1954 with a second large screen.

Robert Parkinson concluded "Not least, it (the Civic Theatre) allowed the Jones family to innovate for the benefit of picture goers, a technique that would be developed further at the Regent."

=== Regent Theatre ===
In 1934 Herbert Jones bought a block of land on the eastern side of Keira Street, between Crown and Market Streets, with the intention of erecting a picture theatre. In September 1935, architect Reginald John Magoffin of Sydney submitted plans to the Chief Secretary for a theatre measuring 130 feet by 84 feet behind an open courtyard itself measuring 120 feet by 40 feet. Revised plans submitted in April 1936 showed dressing rooms, fly tower, stage 45 feet by 16 feet, auditorium 70 feet by 102 feet (height 36 feet), courtyard as before, bio box at rear of circle, brick building, galvanized roof on steel trusses, and 1569 seats.

Following Chief Secretary approval, Jones launched a new company called South Coast Theatres Ltd, with authorised capital of 50,000 pounds (of which 20,000 pounds was to be raised in public shares) for the purpose of "erecting a Picture Theatre on Freehold Land situated in Keira Street, Wollongong the land is recognised as a very fine site for a Theatre will be of the latest design, modern in every particular. Special features will be the approach, comfortable seating, spacious lounges, winter garden, and ultra modern lighting effects. The Auditorium being set back from Keira Street will eliminate traffic noises, and be of material advantage to the acoustics with the present population there is already ample scope for a further Picture Theatre, and with the continuous increase, it will become a necessity, to cope with the number of theatregoers, many of whom at present are frequently unable to obtain seats. It is proposed to extend the operations of the Company on the South Coast after the theatre is well established in Wollongong as local conditions develop, the Management will probably be able to increase the average receipts by providing a more or less continuous series of Star Pictures, and so increase the takings and net profits beyond the figures shown .."

The prospectus also contained an architect's impression of the courtyard and auditorium exterior. The building that was eventually erected bore little resemblance to the 1936 ambitious plan.

On the Chief Secretary's inquiring about the lack of building progress in late 1938, Jones claimed that industrial, financial and political conditions had prevented work commencing. A case for not withdrawing approval was also put by Ernest Sommerlad MLC who later in 1945 was one of the key founders of the National Trust of Australia (NSW).

By November 1939 he notified the Chief Secretary that war has now intervened. "At present I am concerned with an attempt made by Wollongong Theatres Ltd to enter Balgownie in opposition to my existing holding and when this matter is disposed of I will give further consideration to the Keira Street proposition".

While war now provided Mr Jones with a good excuse, it seems likely that he had been keeping officialdom at bay in the absence of sufficient finance that the company had failed to raise.

Jones did not live to see the project commenced, let alone completed, for he died in March 1943. His wife, Emily Vaughan Jones and his son, Maurice, took over the picture business. In February 1947 they re-activated the Keira Street project and were then subject to processes of the Theatres and Films Commission. On this occasion, however, opposition did not arise and the Commission approved the project. Magoffin updated his plans to provide for rented offices over the vestibule, instead of an open courtyard, claiming as a precedent the erection of the Sydney Prince Edward Theatre auditorium over the vestibule. Construction of offices was intended to bring in much needed funds for the later construction of the auditorium.

Building work commenced in February 1950 but progress was very slow and the offices were not completed until 1954. It was commonly believed at the time by local observers as the vestibule was being constructed that it was in fact the theatre itself. But the even larger building which subsequently rose behind the vestibule was gradually recognised to be the theatre auditorium.

The vestibule, with its "glamorous wall and ceiling treatment" was the work of the acclaimed interior designers Marion Hall Best and Janet Single. Marion Hall Best who was born in 1905 became one of the first independent decorators operating in Sydney. By the time she closed her business in 1974 she had established a reputation as "high priestess of the avant-garde".

The Best style was "characterised by an adventurous and sophisticated use of colour in glazed walls and ceilings, international modernist and Australian furniture, Japanese temple blinds and lights and marimekko cottons and Jim Thompson Thai Silks".

Best's other significant public commissions included The Lobby Restaurant, Canberra and a consultancy on the seating fabrics and outdoor furniture for the Sydney Opera House.

Theatre patrons had to wait until Boxing Day 1957 for the theatre's opening - twenty-three years since the land was purchased for this purpose.

Highlights of the theatre's operation were

- the first cinemascope screening in 1961,
- the installation of a Westrex Stereophonic Sound system in August 1963 for the presentation of the movie "South Pacific",
- a new giant curved screen (32 feet by 19 feet) for the Todd-AO production "My Fair Lady" in October, 1967 (the screen was renewed in June, 1976),
- in the biobox two Phillips Cinemeccanica 70mm projectors
- and in more recent years Dolby system speakers at the rear of the lower circle and on side walls.

The Theatre is a remarkable monument to an enterprising family of the Illawarra district and remained in the family's control until the death of Herbert Jones' daughter, Rowena Milgrove. Her death in January 2004 came 20 days before she was due to close the cinema permanently for financial reasons.

The building had been faced with the threat of demolition in 2002, when Lendlease raised the possibility of demolishing the building as part of a redevelopment of Wollongong Central. The plans did not proceed.

The Gateway City Church bought the 1200-seat theatre for $3.5 million in 2005, then spent $1 million on improvements, also turning the space into an occasional live music venue. The building was placed on the market in October 2009, in a surprise sale bid that came to nothing. In 2016, the owners of the building painted the beloved landmark olive green, after heritage investigations confirmed this was the facade's original colour.

In August 2017, the Gateway City Church advertised the building for sale, announcing that they had outgrown the building. Media reports in June 2018 indicated that the building had found a buyer and was under contract, and that while the identity of the buyer could not be revealed at that stage, they intended to "occupy it and reinvigorate it as a theatre". The 2018 sale fell through; however, in early 2020, it was sold to a local business consortium, with hospitality figure Joe McGuinness and the Yours and Owls production group lodging the relevant applications to reopen the theatre as a live performance venue. The proposal sought to restore the theatre while removing the auditorium seating in favour of standing areas, adapting the foyer milk bars into alcoholic bars, and adding a bar at the back of the auditorium, citing the example of the Enmore Theatre in Sydney.

== Description ==
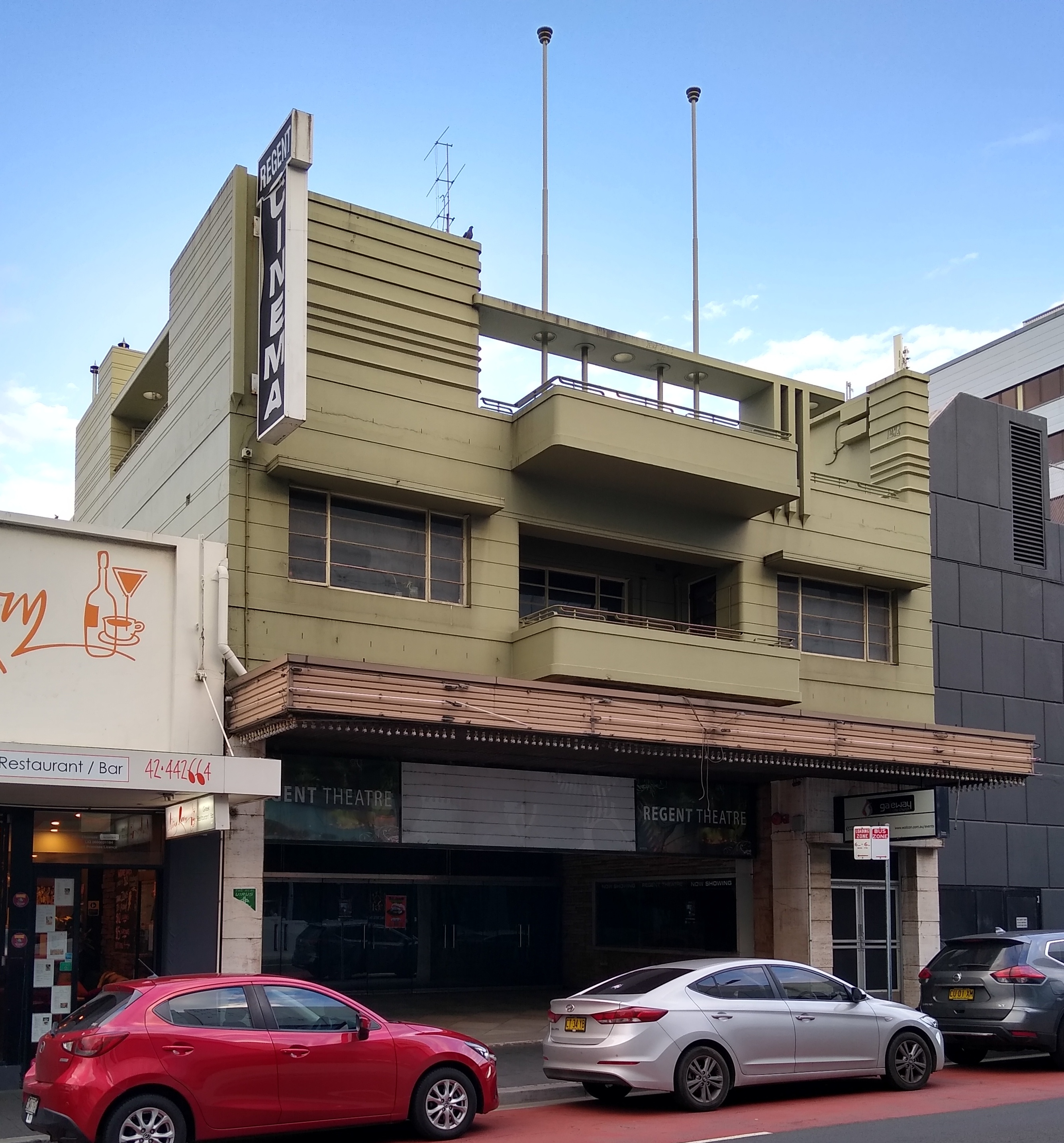
Regent Theatre

The Regent facade is of robust geometrical composition of Functionalist and Art Deco Forms. The theatre auditorium is "beautifully simple" (Robert Irving) with a criss-cross ceiling pattern of plaster moulding featuring hundreds of star-lights. The ceiling curves and at the sides disappears into a plaster trough which was itself originally designed to house concealed lighting, The auditorium ceiling and walls are painted gray-green in strong contrast to the orange-red house curtain.

The proscenium is surrounded by a plain plaster trough in which concealed lighting has now been disconnected. On each side of the auditorium a plaster moulding depicts a mythological scene beneath the gilt rays of a star or sun in the form of a round opalescent glass covering for an electric light which never seems to have been lit.

The view from the stage reveals clusters of lights under the circle balcony, Dolby stereo speakers at the rear of the lower circle and on sidewalls, and the projection room at the rear of the circle.

The projection box holds an "impressive" (Robert Parkinson) array of equipment - two Westrex machines (no longer in use) and two Philips Todd-AO DP-70 projectors manufactured in Eindhoven, Holland with the manufacturing serial numbers 2377 and 2382. In this respect they are similar to the projectors that Hoyts Theatres installed in their Sydney Mayfair and Paris Theatres. (Greg Beasley) Other equipment includes a slide projector and the "usual accoutrements of such a nerve centre." (Robert Parkinson)

The Keira Street entrance to the Regent is through five double glass doors that lead into a 120-foot terrazzo floored vestibule. On the left of the vestibule are display cases and on the right a long candy bar, ticket office and managerial suite. The brilliant multi-coloured glazing of walls and ceiling was the work of (Lady) Marion Hall Best, acclaimed Australian interior designer, with assistance of Janet Single.

The unusually glamorous effect is enhanced at the far end by several pendant pumpkin-shaped lanterns, placed at irregular intervals and heights.

At each side of the divided staircase to the mezzanine lounge are smaller ticket boxes (no longer used) and doors to the stalls, in this theatre called the "lower circle", a term that had been peculiar to the rival company Wollongong Theatres but, in this case, adopted by the competitor for the whole ground floor seating area.

The mezzanine lounge is a vast space underneath the Dress Circle whose exposed supporting beams thrust the sloping ceiling upward. The decor here has a pronounced oriental motif in the bamboo papered ceiling, the tropical pot plants, and rear-lit paper screens of the candy bar.

At each end of this "Grand Assembly" a split-level staircase leads to the dress circle and a breathtaking view of the starry auditorium ceiling.

The Regent "reveals many overseas influences including the "atmospheric" theatre type" (Greater Wollongong Heritage Study) It appears to reflect the architectural style of the Museum of Modern Art in New York, 1938/39 by Edward Durrell Stone.

=== Condition ===
The theatre was reported as intact, in good condition and well maintained as at 11 June 2002.

=== Modifications and dates ===
The only superficial changes that have occurred are that the awnings neon sign has disappeared, new "fairy" lighting was installed in the ceiling above the street entrance and a fountain has been removed from the foyer (following vandalism) to be replaced by an attractively decorative panel of flora and fauna.

== Heritage listing ==
The Regent Theatre is of State heritage significance for the rare and outstanding interior design of its foyer and mezzanine areas by Marion Hall Best. This was a major commission for a public space by one of Australia's leading modernist interior designers, and one of the few intact examples remaining of Best's signature "glazing" paintwork. The Regent is also of State significance as an intact and outstanding example of mid-twentieth century professional women's design in NSW. The Regent Theatre is also of State significance for being a rare and intact large capacity cinema. The building and its facade were designed in the Art Deco style by Reginald Magoffin in the mid 1930s although it was not actually built until the mid 1950s. The theatre has significance associated with the introduction of wide screen technology to cinemas in NSW . It still retains its wide screen format and large scale picture palace style auditorium. The Regent also has local significance for its historical associations with Herbert Wyndham Jones, since it represents the culmination of his entrepreneurial endeavours in cinema management in the Illawarra region. The Regent has social significance for the thousands of people from the region who formed its audiences over half a century.

Regent Theatre was listed on the New South Wales State Heritage Register on 9 May 2005 having satisfied the following criteria.

The place is important in demonstrating the course, or pattern, of cultural or natural history in New South Wales.

The Regent Theatre is of State significance as a rare, large capacity cinema. It is a local manifestation of mid twentieth century Art Deco movie theatre construction in NSW, demonstrating the cultural importance and growth of this form of popular entertainment in this area.

The place has a strong or special association with a person, or group of persons, of importance of cultural or natural history of New South Wales's history.

The Regent Theatre is of State significance for its historical associations with Marion Hall Best who did all the interior design. Best's design for the theatre was one of her more significant public commissions and is one of the few surviving examples of her work. A leading practitioner of the avante guarde, Marion Hall Best was one of the most significant and influential interior designers in the twentieth century in Australia. In addition, the Regent Theatre is of high local significance for its historical associations with Herbert Wyndham Jones and his family, including his daughter Rowena Milgrove who managed the cinema for three decades. The theatre represents the culmination of Jones' entrepreneurial endeavours in cinema management in the Illawarra region. Jones pioneered film exhibition in the silent movie days and provided vital entertainment in the days of the Great Depression. His family carried on the business after his death in 1943, introducing innovations and technical advancements in theatres in the region.

The place is important in demonstrating aesthetic characteristics and/or a high degree of creative or technical achievement in New South Wales.

The Regent Theatre at Keira Street Wollongong is likely to be of State significance for the rare and outstanding interior design of its foyer and mezzanine areas by Marion Hall Best. This was a major commission for a public space by one of Australia's leading modernist interior designers, and one of the few intact examples remaining of Best's signature "glazing" paintwork. With Best working on the interiors with the assistance of her architect niece, Janet Single, the Regent Theatre is further likely to be of State significance as an intact and outstanding example of mid-twentieth century women's design in NSW. Its aesthetic significance is enhanced by the almost totally intact nature of the interior and exterior of the theatre.

The Regent Theatre retains its original large capacity cinema auditorium and wide screen format making the theatre one of the increasingly small number of picture palace style cinema theatres in NSW retaining their original configuration. The historic dimensions of the auditorium are of State significance rather than its technology.

The place has strong or special association with a particular community or cultural group in New South Wales for social, cultural or spiritual reasons.

The Regent is of high social significance for the thousands of people from the region who formed its audiences over half a century. The concerted community action in response to reports of its proposed demolition is a sign of the high esteem in which it is held.

The place has potential to yield information that will contribute to an understanding of the cultural or natural history of New South Wales.

The Regent Theatre is of local significance as a surviving large scale early cinema. It marks the introduction of wide-screen technology in NSW cinemas and still retains its original orientation and layout

The place possesses uncommon, rare or endangered aspects of the cultural or natural history of New South Wales.

The Regent Theatre is of State significance for the rarity and intactness of its interior design by Marion Hall Best, which may be her only surviving commercial interior. It is one of the few intact grand cinemas remaining in NSW.

The place is important in demonstrating the principal characteristics of a class of cultural or natural places/environments in New South Wales.

The Regent is of high local significance for being a rare, intact and representative cinema from the 1950s when the theatre industry was broadening its horizons with the use of "Cinemascope" technology.
