= Doles Dickens =

- Born: January 18, 1916; North Carolina, United States
- Died: May 2, 1972 (aged 56); New Jersey, United States
- Occupation(s): Musician, bandleader, arranger, songwriter
- Instrument: Double bass
- Years active: Late 1930s – mid-1960s
- Labels: Continental, Super Disc, Gotham, Decca, Dot

Doles Dickens (January 18, 1916 – May 2, 1972) was an American jazz and R&B musician, bandleader, arranger and songwriter who was active in New York from the 1930s to the 1960s.

== Biography ==
He was born in North Carolina, moving to Passaic, New Jersey with his family as a child. He played bass in bands led by Eddie Durham and Buster Smith in the late 1930s, before making his recording debut in 1940 as bass player with the Eddie South Orchestra. He left South's band in 1943 to join a vocal group, the Four Toppers, who then changed their name to the Five Red Caps. The group reached the national pop charts with "I Learned A Lesson I'll Never Forget" in 1944, but Dickens soon left to join the Phil Moore Four as bass player, recording with them for the RCA label.

He formed the Doles Dickens Quartet with Herbie Scott (trumpet), Reuben Cole (piano), and Dickie Thompson (guitar), in New York City in 1946. They recorded for the Continental, Super Disc and Gotham record labels over the next three years, releasing a string of jump blues singles but with little commercial success. In mid 1949 Dickens began recording for Decca Records. By that time, his group had become a Quintet, comprising Dickens himself on bass, Louis Judge (tenor sax), Clarence Harmon (piano), Sam Hendricks (guitar), and Jimmy Crawford (drums), with vocalist Joe Gregory. One of his recordings was "a slightly speeded up, slightly smoothed out adaptation" of Wild Bill Moore's earlier record, "Rock and Roll". Dickens also made recordings as an accompanist to boogie woogie blues musician Piano Red.

Dickens and his Quintet continued to record for Decca until 1951, their recordings including "We're Gonna Rock This Morning" (1951). Dickens also undertook club performances as the leader of Doles Dickens and His Whispers; it is unclear whether the same musicians were in both groups. He maintained a career as a session musician in New York, appearing on records by Wilbert Harrison, Varetta Dillard, Jimmy Witherspoon, Piano Red, Mahalia Jackson, Bill Haley, LaVern Baker and others. His final recording under his own name was "Piakukaungcung", an instrumental on the Dot label in 1958, written by Lincoln Chase and described by Billboard as having "the sound of hysteria... [and] the quality of a jungle war dance."

Between 1957 and 1964, Dickens also served as arranger and musical director for The Mello-Harps. During the 1960s, he remained actively involved in music production and direction, writing and recording on Decca with Vernon Harrell and "Little Gigi" (Gloria Glenn), among others.

Dickens died in New Jersey on May 2, 1972, aged 56.
