= Regent Cinema, Deal =

Former cinema in Deal, Kent, England

Coordinates: 51°13′19.6″N 1°24′15.3″E

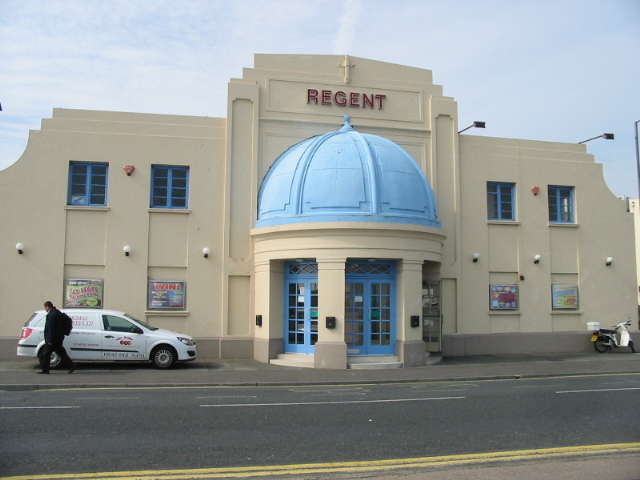
Front (east) elevation in 2008

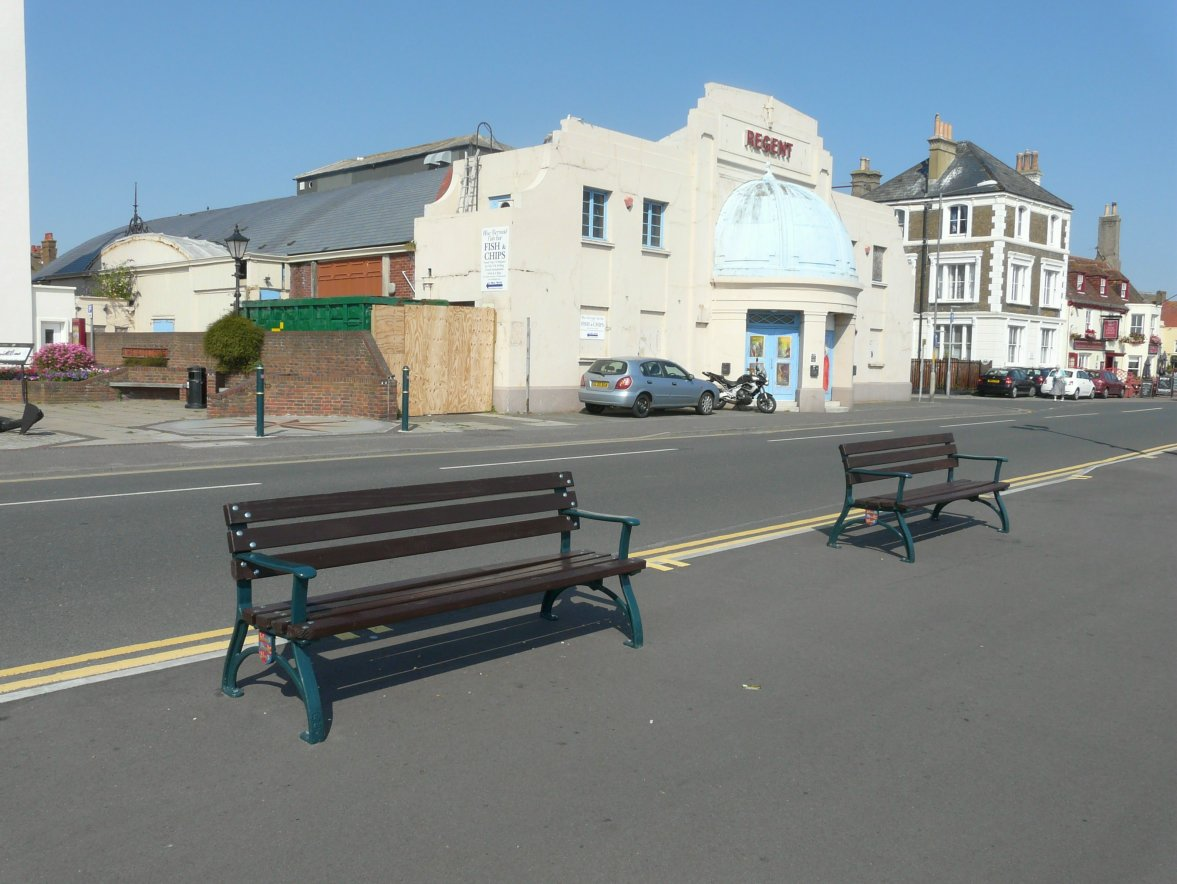
View of south and east elevations in 2013

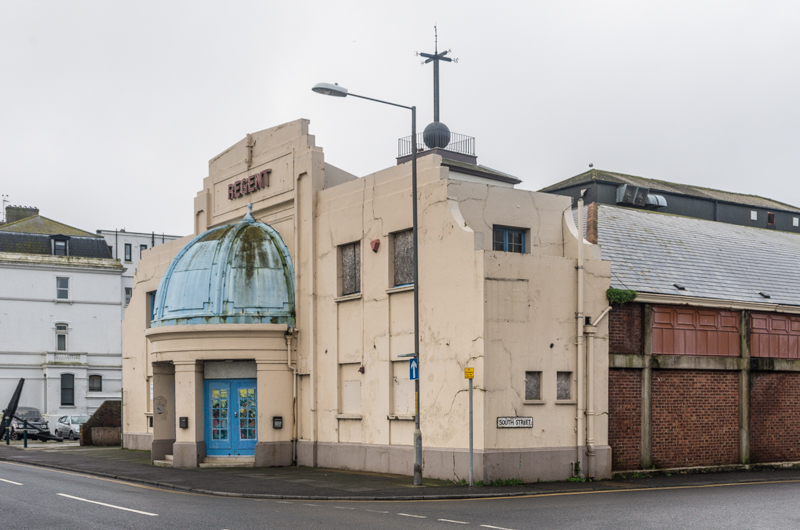
View of north and east elevations in 2014, with the Timeball Tower visible behind

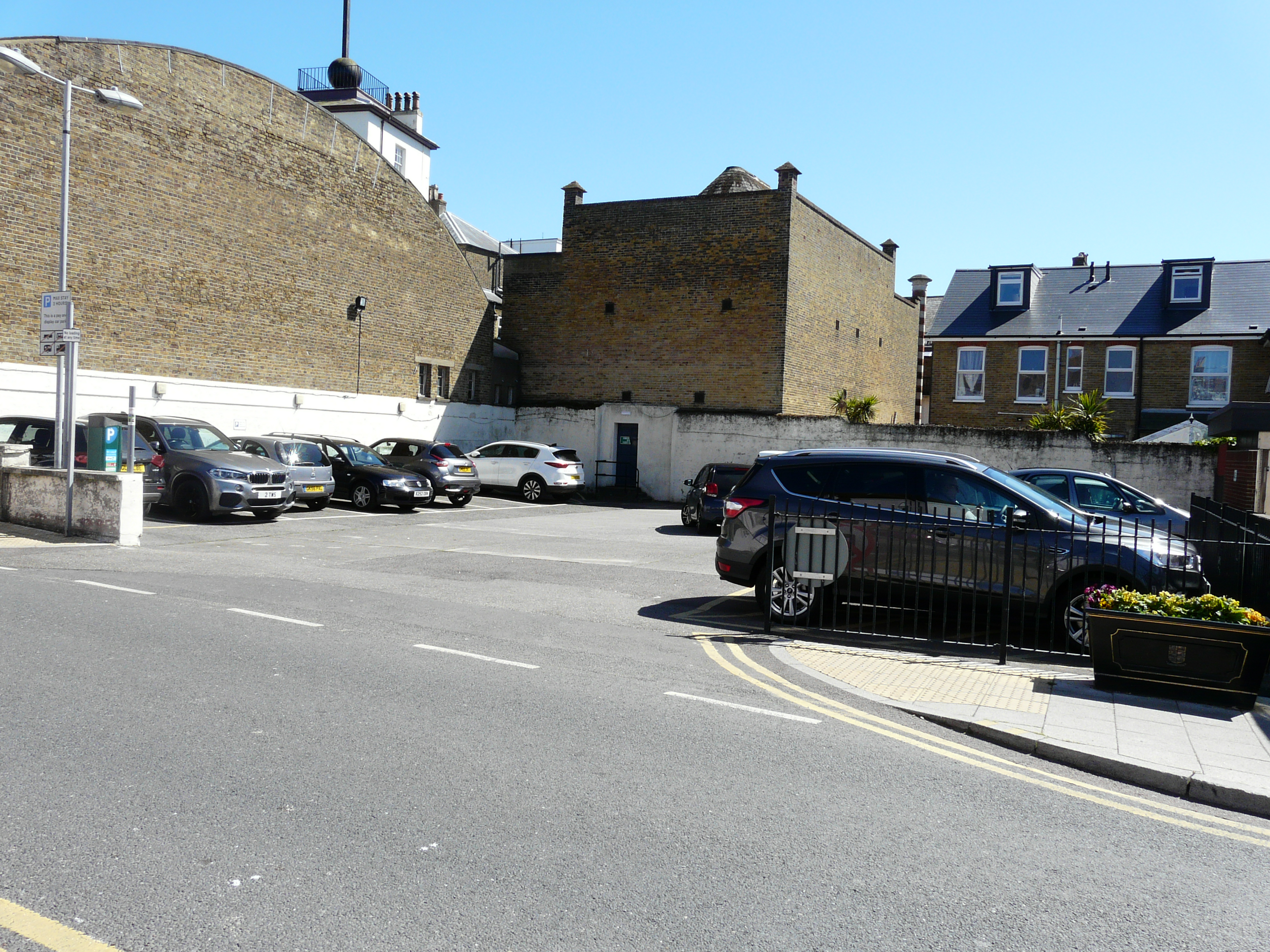
View of rear (west) elevation

The Regent Cinema is a former cinema and bingo hall in Deal, Kent, England. It was originally built in 1928 as a simple pavilion for musical concerts but this proved unprofitable and in 1933 it was converted into a cinema, with an Art Deco-style entrance. The cinema closed in 1963 and was briefly used as a wrestling venue before being converted into a bingo hall. The bingo hall closed in 2009 and the site has lain derelict since then.

The Regent was sold to developers by Dover District Council in 2011. It was sold at below market value on the understanding that it would be restored as a cinema for the use by local people. Initial plans, presented by the new owners in 2014, were unpopular owing to a residential element. The site lay dormant for a period and a campaign group, Reopen the Regent, formed to encourage its restoration. The group successfully campaigned to have the site designated an asset of community value. The owners submitted new plans for the site in 2019, including a two-screen cinema. Works did not proceed, with the owners blaming the COVID-19 pandemic and planning permission has since expired.

== History ==
The structure is located on Beach Street, Deal, Kent, on the English Channel seafront. It was originally constructed in 1928 as an iron and glass pavilion for musical performances, particularly by military bands (the town was home to a Royal Marine depot). Although the structure was basic, providing little more than shelter from poor weather, there was criticism over its cost. At its opening the Lord Warden of the Cinque Ports, William Lygon, 7th Earl Beauchamp, stated "It is the duty of everyone to make this enterprise go." The opening coincided with a decline in interest in musical concerts as well as variety performances and dances, owing to the rise of cinemas.

The pavilion was loss making and the owner, the borough council, were approached by businessmen Harry Carey and Henry Boyer who proposed to rent the structure and convert it to a cinema. The conversion, Art Deco in style, was designed by Margate architect Percy Levett. The works had a low budget but included the addition of a domed frontage, moving of the original stage, construction of a cafe and erection of a first floor extension to house the projection box and offices. The cinema boasted 911 seats and was the largest in the town until the opening of an Odeon in 1936.

The cinema opened in July 1933 and its first showing was that year's King of the Ritz, a musical. The cinema was regarded as draughty, suffering from its exposed seafront location. During the Second World War the roof of the building was used to house a searchlight, used for anti-aircraft defence. In the mid-1940s operation of the cinema was taken over by ASER. Later in its life the cinema switched from showing general releases, to specialising in X-rated films.

The cinema closed in 1963 and it was briefly used to stage wrestling matches. It afterward became a bingo hall, operated by Bloom Circuit. The hall closed in 2009, blaming the effects of the 2006 indoor smoking ban.

== Proposed redevelopment ==
=== First plans ===
Ownership lay with Dover District Council until 2011 when it was sold to James Wallace and Mark Digweed. The sale price was £385,000; a below market value on the understanding that it would be restored and reopened as a cinema. The town had no other cinema.

Wallace and Digweed presented plans for redevelopment in 2014. These included a residential element that proved unpopular with local residents and were never presented for planning permission.

=== Hiatus ===
For a period no further plans were presented, though the owners met with the council for pre-planning talks in early 2016, and a local campaign group, Reopen the Regent, was formed to promote the building's restoration. In May 2016 actor Neil Stuke, a member of the group, apologised for implied threats made in an email to Wallace and Digweed. Stuke said "I allowed my frustrations to get the better of me as saving The Regent is something I believe very passionately about". The owners reported the email to the police who investigated and found no offence had been committed. Actor Mark Rylance was another supporter of the campaign group. The group have successfully had the Regent designated an asset of community value.

In 2018 the council issued a notice under section 215 of the Town and Country Planning Act 1990, ordering the owners to make essential repairs by August, but these were not carried out. On 25 October 2018 Reopen the Regent held a protest at the site with DIY-related props to raise awareness of the need for repairs.

=== Second plans ===
In January 2019 Wallace and Digweed submitted a second set of plans for planning approval, without any residential element. These were prepared by David Wright, architect of the Brighton Dome refurbishment. Wright's plans showed much of the original structure to be retained, though the south wall, whose steelwork was corroded, was to be replaced with glass. Two 104-seat cinema screens would have been built as well as a 120-seat restaurant which could be used as a third screen on a temporary basis. The dome above the entrance was to be recovered in a bottle green material, restoring its original colour. A mezzanine floor with skylight above was to be created, with 30 seats, available for private hire. A small extension to the south side would form a new entrance with a landscaped square adjacent to the Timeball Tower. The existing ground floor windows would be expanded to make the most of the sea views. The new development was estimated to create 15–20 new jobs, with the construction work to take place over twelve months.

The council granted approval to the plans on 18 July 2019, with a three year period to commence works. However works did not proceed, with the owners blaming the COVID-19 pandemic. With works delayed, Reopen the Regent held another rally on 30 October 2021 to encourage the owners to "raise the Regent from the dead". This was Halloween themed and attended by around 200 people who howled at the moon during the 30-minute event. A further rally was held on 2 May 2022, also attended by around 200 people, declaring a mayday over the failure to proceed with the redevelopment.

On 7 June 2022, just before 5pm, the Regent suffered from a fire. It was quickly brought under control by Kent Fire and Rescue Service. Kent Police investigated the fire as a potential arson attack. The structure is in a damaged state; the roof has been leaking since at least 2020, pigeons have nested within and it has been broken into for use by drug addicts. In July 2022, Reopen the Regent asked for Dover council to instruct repairs to the owners or carry out a compulsory purchase of the property. The council says the building owners are working on alternative plans for the site, but that these still include use as a cinema.
