= Regal Cinemas (UK) =

UK cinema chain operated by ABC Cinemas

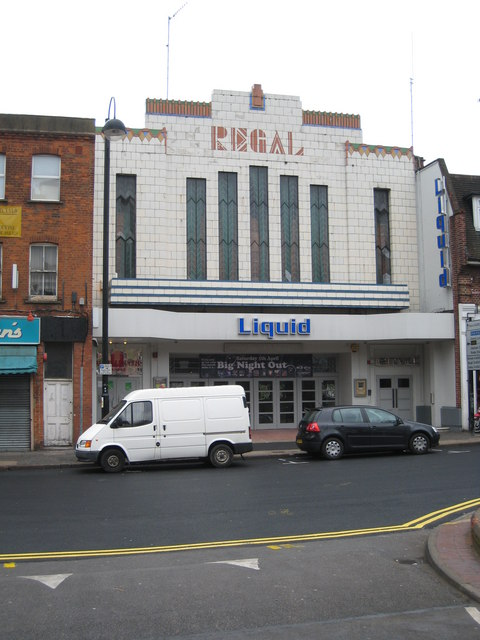
The former Regal Cinema in Uxbridge.

Regal Cinemas was one of the first cinema chains in the United Kingdom. In 1928, Regal Cinemas became part of Associated British Cinemas but retained the name 'Regal Cinemas'. Many of the Regal Cinemas closed during the second half of the 20th century.

The surviving Regal Cinemas in Cromer and Redruth are owned by Merlin Cinemas. The Regal in Henley is owned by Picturehouse Cinemas.

== Northwich ==
The town of Northwich has a campaign to bring back their Regal Cinema after it closed in 2007, having served the town for 60 years. The Regal Northwich was an independent cinema run by Cheshire County Cinemas and was not part of the Regal chain. It opened with the film Storm in a Teacup.

== Dumfries ==
The Regal in Dumfries opened in 1931. It was split in 1972 with a bingo club in the stalls and the cinema remaining in the circle. Cannon bought the cinema in 1986 and became ABC in 1995 until 2001, when it was renamed to Odeon. The cinema closed in 2018 with the bingo club closing in 2023. The cinema has been purchased by Tristan Campbell and will reopen early in 2026.
