= Regal Theatre, New Delhi =

Former cinema in New Delhi, India

Regal Theatre
- Regal Cinema
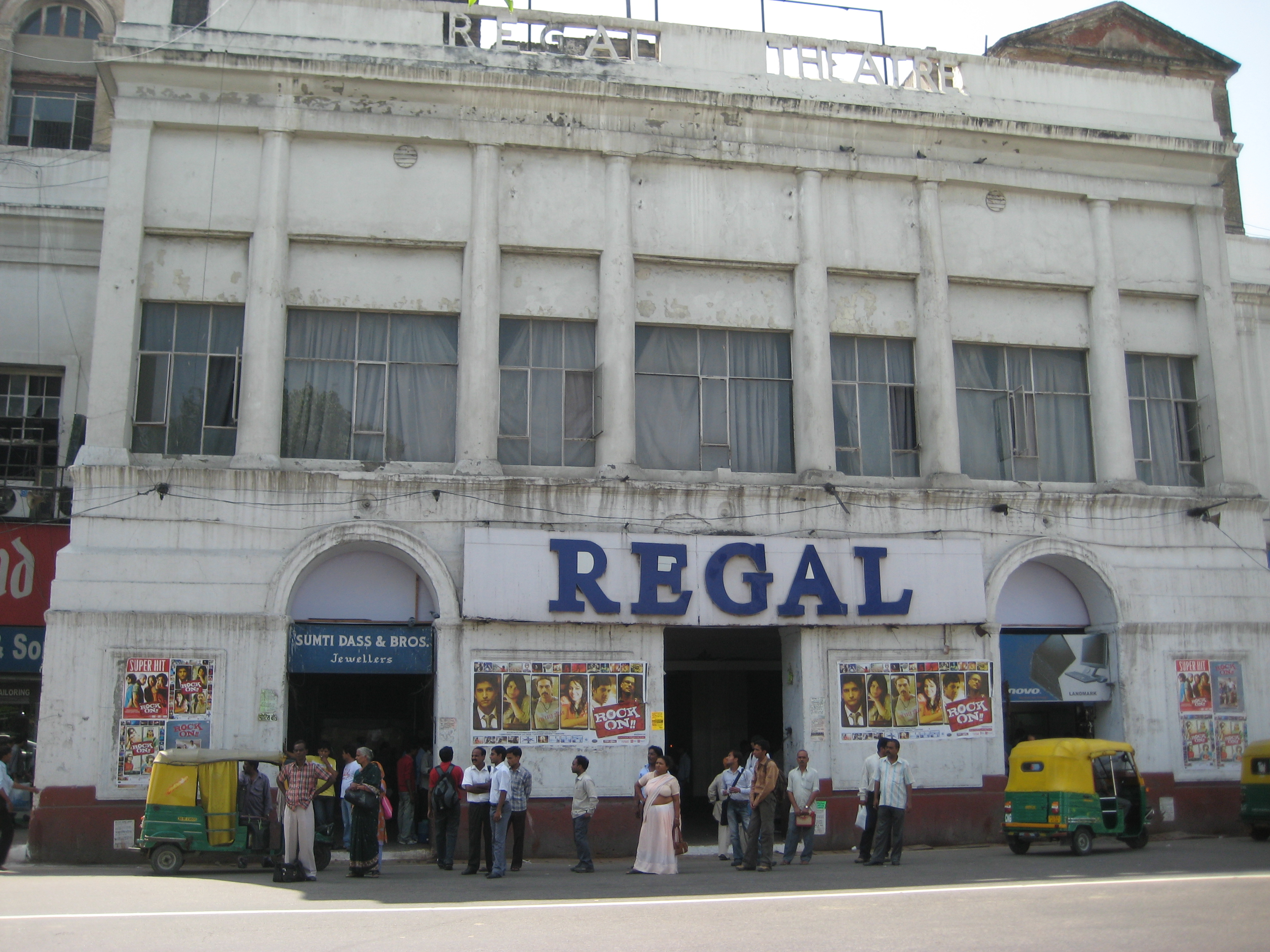

- Location within Delhi
- Location: Regal Building, Connaught Place, New Delhi, India
- Coordinates: 28°37′50″N 77°13′1″E
- Current use: Museum (Madame Tussauds Delhi)

Construction
- Opened: 1932
- Closed: 30 March 2017
- Years active: 1932–2017
- Architect: Walter Sykes George

The Regal Theatre also known as the Regal Cinema was a single screen cinema hall and theatre situated in Connaught Place in New Delhi, India.

== History ==
The theatre, which was the biggest in New Delhi, was built in 1932. It served as a venue for ballets, plays and talkies. The Regal was also the site of theatrical premiere of Bollywood and Hollywood films. The Academy Award-winning Gone with the Wind had its Indian premiere at the Regal in 1940. Films involving Raj Kapoor and Nargis also made its premiere at the theatre.

The Regal was the first in Connaught Place to screen Hindi films and fared on its own against competitors, such as the Chanakya which was established in the 1970s. The opening of the PVR Anupam, a four-screen multiplex marked the decline of the theater. As multiplexes started to gain widespread reception in the 2000s, the Regal Theatre resorted to screening B-grade Bollywood films to stay operational.

On the last day of the theatre's operation on 30 March 2017, the Raj Kapoor-directed films Mera Naam Joker and Sangam were screened.

The owner of the cinema plans to open a multiplex in its place.

== Building ==
The building of the theatre, the Regal Building, was built in 1932. It was designed by architect Walter Sykes George. and has three floors. In 1996, the first and second floors above the ground floor were sold to Madame Tussauds to open a wax museum in the building.

The design of the building is a combination of Georgian and Mughal architecture.
