= Challenger =

Challenger, Challengers, The Challenger, or The Challengers, may refer to:

== Entertainment ==
=== Comics and manga ===
- Challenger (character), comic book character
- Challengers (manga), by Hinako Takanaga

=== Film and telemovies ===
- Challenger: An Industrial Romance, a 1980 Canadian documentary film
- Challenger (1990 film), a television movie about the space shuttle Challenger disaster
- The Challengers (film), a 1990 family film produced for the Canadian Broadcasting Corporation
- The Challenger, the original British title for the film The Challenger Disaster, a 2013 BBC made-for-TV film
- The Challenger (2015 film), an American sports drama film
- Challengers (film), a 2024 romantic sports film directed by Luca Guadagnino

=== TV shows ===
- The Challengers (TV series), a 1979–80 Canadian biographical television series
- The Challengers (game show), a 1990 American game show hosted by Dick Clark
- Challenger (1997 game show), an Australian game show
- Challenger (2013 game show), a Pakistani game show

=== Games ===
- Challenger (video game), a 1985 game developed by Hudson Soft
- Challengers (role-playing game), 1985
- Challenger (arcade game), a 1981 game developed by Centuri

=== Literature ===
- Challenger (novel), a Star Trek: New Earth novel by Diane Carey
- Professor Challenger, a fictional scientist and adventurer created by Arthur Conan Doyle; and media franchise
- Challenger, a science fiction fanzine by Guy H. Lillian III which was nominated twelve times for the Hugo Award for Best Fanzine

=== Music ===
==== Performers ====
- The Challengers (band), a 1960s surf rock group

- Challengers (album), 2007, by The New Pornographers
- Challenger (Burning Star Core album), a 2008 album
- Challenger (Knut album), a 2002 album
- Challenger (Memphis May Fire album), a 2012 album
- Challenger, 2013 album by Recover
- Challenger (EP), 2021, by JO1

==== Songs ====
- "Challenger", a song by Misia from the 2004 album Mars & Roses
- "Challenger", a song by Burning Star Core from the 2008 album Challenger
- "Challengers", a song by The New Pornographers from the 2007 album Challengers

== People and animals ==
- Challenger (actor) (1959–2010), Bangladeshi film and television actor
- Romeo Challenger (born 1950), rock drummer, father of Ben Challenger
- Ben Challenger (born 1978), English high jumper
- Okeem Challenger (born 1989), Antiguan and Barbudan footballer
- Melanie Challenger, British poet and writer
- Challenger (eagle) (born 1989), an American bald eagle known for free flights
- Challenger (horse) (1927–1948), a British Thoroughbred racehorse

== Places ==
- Challenger Deep, the deepest point in the world's oceans
- Challenger Plateau, a submarine rise in the Tasman Sea close to the New Zealand coast
- Challenger Mountains, a subrange of the Arctic Cordillera in Nunavut, Canada
- Mount Challenger, a mountain on East Falkland, Falkland Islands
- Challenger Point, a mountain in Colorado, US
- Challenger Harbour, a marina in Fremantle, Western Australia
- Challengers, Saint Kitts and Nevis, a settlement on the island of Saint Kitts
- Challenger Colles, a cluster of hills on Pluto
- Challenger mine, a gold mine in South Australia

=== Schools ===
- Challenger Secondary School, a public school in Spanaway, Washington, US
- Challenger Early College High School, a public secondary school in Hickory, North Carolina, US
- Challenger Institute of Technology, former name of South Metropolitan TAFE, a Technical and Further Education institution in Fremantle, Western Australia

== Science ==
- Challenger Society for Marine Science, established in 1903 in the UK
- Challenger expedition, a British oceanographic survey in 1872–1876
- Challenger Center for Space Science Education, an American nonprofit educational organization

== Sports ==
- Challengers League, former name of K3 League, an amateur football competition in South Korea
- Challengers Cup, a South Korean football competition
- ATP Challenger Tour, a series of men's professional tennis tournaments
- Challenger (America's Cup), the yacht representing the club that currently opposes the defender
- PCB Challengers, a Pakistani women's cricket team
- Royal Challengers Bengaluru, an Indian Premier League crickter team based in Bengaluru
- Royal Challengers Bengaluru (WPL), a Women's Premier League crickter team based in Bengaluru
- Challenger (ski course), a World Cup alpine ski racing slope in the western US, at Sun Valley, Idaho

== Transportation ==
=== Air and space craft ===
- Bombardier Challenger, a series of business jets manufactured by Bombardier
- Space Shuttle Challenger, a NASA space shuttle
  - Space Shuttle Challenger disaster
- Quad City Challenger, an ultralight airplane
- Challenger, the Apollo 17 lunar module

=== Land vehicles ===
- Challenger trucks, a Canadian maker of heavy trucks
- There have been four tanks named Challenger in British military service:
  - Cruiser Mk VIII Challenger in service during World War II
  - Challenger 1 in service from the mid-1980s to early 21st century
  - Challenger 2 in service from 1998 onwards
  - Challenger 3 in development, predicted to enter service from 2027 onwards
- Dodge Challenger, a car made by Dodge
- Mitsubishi Pajero Sport, an SUV once sold in Japan as the Mitsubishi Challenger
- Tokai Challenger, a solar car
- Challenger (train), a named passenger train fleet
- Union Pacific Challenger, a type of steam locomotive
- Challenger Tractor, a rubber-tracked agricultural tractor

=== Sea vessels ===
- Columbia 24 Challenger, an American sailboat design
- HMS Challenger, any of eight Royal Navy ships
- RSS Challenger, a Sjöormen-class submarine in the Republic of Singapore Navy
- USS Challenger (ID-3630), an early-20th century US Navy cargo ship
- Challenger (clipper), built in London in 1852
- Challenger (1853 clipper), built in Boston
- Challenger (Long Beach fireboat), operated by the fire department of Long Beach, California, US
- Challenger (steamboat), a steamboat built in 1865 that operated in Puget Sound, Washington, US
- Stena Challenger, a ferry, formerly Isle of Inishfree and Pride of Cherbourg, now Kaitaki
- Glomar Challenger, a deep sea research and scientific drilling vessel for oceanography and marine geology studies
- Deepsea Challenger, used by James Cameron in the Mariana Trench
- SS St. Marys Challenger, a freight vessel operating on the North American Great Lakes built in 1906

== Other uses ==
- Challenger, a line of microcomputer systems manufactured by Ohio Scientific
- Challenger (cable system), an international submarine communications cable between US and Bermuda
- Challenger (company), an Australian investment management company
- Challenger hop, a beer flavouring

== See also ==
- Challenge (disambiguation)
- The Challenge (disambiguation)
- Challenge Cup (disambiguation)
