= Challenge One =

Challenge One or variations, may refer to:

- Challenge-1, or Challenge One, a Tunisian satellite
- Challenge +1, a one hour timeshift simulcast of TV channel Challenge
- Challenge (2009 film), a Bengali film, which has a subsequent spin-off Challenge 2

== See also ==
- The Challenge (disambiguation)
- Challenge (disambiguation)
