= Challenge =

Challenge may refer to:

- Voter challenging or caging, a method of challenging the registration status of voters
- Euphemism for disability
- Peremptory challenge, a dismissal of potential jurors from jury duty

== Law ==
- A procedure or action
- The act of appealing a ruling or decision of a court or administrative agency

== Places ==
=== Geography ===
- Challenge, California, an unincorporated community
- Challenge-Brownsville, California, a census-designated place in Yuba County, California, United States

=== Structures ===
- Challenge Stadium, former name of Perth Superdrome, a sports complex in Perth, Australia

== Books and publications ==
- Challenge (anarchist periodical), American anarchist weekly tabloid, 1938–1939
- Challenge (Communist journal), British Young Communist League magazine, and also the name of the newspaper of the communist Progressive Labor Party (USA)
- Challenge (game magazine), a role-playing game magazine
- Challenge (economics magazine), a magazine covering economic affairs
- Challenge (Bulldog Drummond), a Bulldog Drummond novel by H. C. McNeile
- Challenge (Moroccan magazine), a Moroccan economic weekly magazine
- Challenges (magazine), a French language weekly business magazine
- Challenge (1923), a novel by Vita Sackville-West

== Film and TV ==
=== Film ===
- Challenge (1984 film), an Indian Telugu-language film by A. Kodandarami Reddy
- Challenge (2009 film), an Indian Bengali-language film
  - Challenge 2, its 2012 sequel
- Challenges (film), a 2011 Sri Lankan film
- Challenge (2012 film), an Indian Tamil-language film
- The Challenge (2023 film), Russian film shot aboard the ISS
- Sye (2004 film), or Challenge, a 2004 Indian Telugu-language film

=== Television ===
- Challenge (TV channel), a British television channel
- The Challenge (TV series)
- Food Network Challenge, competitive cooking television series

=== Games ===
- Challenge (Scrabble), an element of the word game
- Challenge (Uno), an element of the card game

=== Music ===
- Challenge (album), a 1969 album by Yuya Uchida & The Flowers
- The Challenge (album), a 1968 Hampton Hawes recording
- Challenge Records (disambiguation), multiple record labels

== Transportation ==
- Challenge (cycle and car), an early British manufacturer of cycles and cars
- Challenge 67, a yacht
- MS Challenge, a ferry

== Sports ==
- Challenge (competition), when a challenger requests to compete against a champion with the title at stake
- Challenge match, a type of exhibition game not part of a wider tournament or series
- Coach's challenge (disambiguation), when a coach requests the officials review a play or call
- Player's challenge, when a player requests a review of the spot a ball landed in Tennis, usually via the Hawk-Eye system

=== Tourist plane contests ===
- Challenge International de Tourisme 1929
- International Touring Competition 1930
- Challenge International de Tourisme 1932
- Challenge International de Tourisme 1934

== Brands ==
- Challenge (company), a New Zealand petroleum brand
- Challenge, an electronics company in the United Kingdom owned by Argos (retailer)

== Other ==
- Internet challenge, Internet memes in the form of challenges
- Challenge (literature), an attempt to remove or restrict access to literary materials
- Challenge coin
- SGI Challenge, a family of server computers from Silicon Graphics
- Challenge Girls Club, associated with ECyD
- A question in challenge–response authentication

== See also ==
- Challenge Cup (disambiguation)
- Challenge–response authentication in computer security, a component of client authentication in some systems
- The Challenge (disambiguation)
- Challenger (disambiguation)
