= No goal =

Call by an official to announce a disallowed goal

No goal is a call made by referees in various goal-scoring sports (football, hockey, lacrosse, etc.) to indicate that a goal has not been legally scored. While such a call can be the logical result of the ball or puck never entering the goal during a goal-scoring opportunity, the more common context for this terminology is when the referee disallows an apparent goal, i.e. when the ball or puck has entered the goal, but the score does not count as a score due to some foul or infraction.

Because the decision often depends on a subjective assessment by the referee, and especially if the score might be critical, such calls can be hotly contested. For fans of one of the teams involved, it may thus refer to a goal that was actually disallowed, or one that in their opinion should have been disallowed, but was not. As a result, in recent years many professional sports leagues have introduced rules allowing for certain calls to be subject to video review automatically, or at the referee's discretion or because of a coach's challenge.

== National Hockey League (NHL) ==
In the NHL a goal may be called a no goal for the following reasons:

1. When the puck has been directed, batted or thrown into the net by an attacking player other than with a stick.
2. (ii) When the puck has been kicked using a distinct kicking motion.
3. (iii) When the puck has deflected directly into the net off an official.
4. (iv) When a goal has been scored and an ineligible player is on the ice.
5. (v) When an attacking player has interfered with a goalkeeper in his goal crease.
6. (vi) When the puck has entered the net after making contact with an attacking player’s stick that is above the height of the crossbar. Where the puck makes contact with the stick is the determining factor.
7. (vii) When the entry into the offensive zone was offside prior to the goal.
8. (viii) When video review confirms the scoring of a goal at one end of the ice, any goal scored at the other end on the same play must be disallowed.
9. (ix) When a Linesman reports a double-minor penalty for high-sticking, a major penalty or a match penalty to the Referee following the scoring of a goal by the offending team, the goal must be disallowed and the appropriate penalty assessed.
10. (x) When a goalkeeper has been pushed into the net together with the puck after making a save. See also 69.6.
11. (xi) When the net becomes displaced accidentally. The goal frame is considered to be displaced if either or both goal pegs are no longer in their respective holes in the ice, or the net has come completely off one or both pegs, prior to or as the puck enters the goal.
12. (xii) During the delayed calling of a penalty, the offending team cannot score unless the non-offending team shoots the puck into their own net. This shall mean that a deflection off an offending player or any physical action by an offending player that may cause the puck to enter the non-offending team’s goal, shall not be considered a legal goal. Play shall be stopped before the puck enters the net (whenever possible) and the signaled penalty assessed to the offending team.
13. (xiii) When the Referee deems the play has been stopped, even if he had not physically had the opportunity to stop play by blowing his whistle.
14. (xiv) Any goal scored, other than as covered by the official rules, shall not be allowed.

== National Lacrosse League (NLL) ==
According to the NLL rulebook (Rule 55: No Goal) a goal may be disallowed under the following conditions:

1. (55.1) When the ball passes through the plane of the net after the game clock’s horn or shot clock has sounded to indicate the end of a quarter or overtime period or expiration of the shot clock.
2. (55.2) A crease violation will result in a no goal. Crease violation is rule 69.
3. (55.3) When the ball passes through the plane of the goal when the attacking team has too many players on the floor including those in the penalty box at the time of the play.
4. (55.4) When the ball passes through the plane of the goal after one of the officials has sounded his whistle for any reason, including the sounding of an inadvertent whistle.
5. (55.5) When the player makes contact with the goalie. See Contact While Shooting on Net Rule 69.
6. (55.6) When the ball passes through the plane of the goal from a stick that is found to be illegal by a stick check.
7. (55.7) When the ball is kicked in a kicking motion directly or indirectly into the opponent’s goal.
8. (55.8) When the ball is directed into the net off the free hand of an opponent.
9. (55.9) When a ball is lodged, or not, in the throat of the pocket and the ball and stick is inadvertently or deliberately tossed into the goal.
10. (55.10) In the event that a goalkeeper has been pushed into the net by his teammate on his own accord and the ball crosses the goal line after making the stop, the goal will be allowed. In the event that a goalkeeper has been pushed into the net by an opponent and the ball crosses the goal line after making the stop, the goal will be disallowed. The plays are subject to any appropriate penalties.
11. (55.11) If the ball is loose in the crease an opposing player may not direct the ball into the goal. If the ball is loose in the crease, an opposing player must have possession prior to any scoring attempt. A no goal shall be called if the ball is loose in the crease, directed by an opposing player and having the ball make contact with the goalie or a defender prior to the ball going into the net.
12. (55.12) If a goal is scored when an ineligible player is on the floor, the goal will be disallowed. The ineligible player will be removed from the game and the club shall not be able to substitute another player on its roster. An ineligible player is a player who had been previously ejected from the game, and subject to league discipline.
13. (55.13) If a goal is scored when the attackers’ stick head is behind the goal line extended when releasing the ball during the act of shooting, the goal will be disallowed.
14. (55.14) If a player takes a shot and the head of his stick comes off and the ball enters the goal, the goal would be disallowed and the ball awarded to the goalie.
