= HMS Challenger =

Eight ships of the Royal Navy have been named HMS Challenger, most famously the fifth, the survey vessel Challenger that carried the Challenger expedition from 1872 to 1876.

- The first HMS Challenger (1806) was a 16-gun brig-sloop launched in 1806 that the French captured in 1811. By some accounts she became the American privateer True Blooded Yankee.
- The second HMS Challenger (1813) was an 18-gun Cruizer-class brig-sloop launched in 1813 and later used as a store hulk before being sold in 1824 at Trincomalee.
- The third HMS Challenger (1826) was a 28-gun sixth rate launched in 1826 and wrecked off Chile in 1835. Under the command of Charles Fremantle, it was in part responsible for the creation of the colony of Western Australia in 1829.
- The fourth Challenger was to have been an 18-gun corvette of 810 tons; the ship was ordered from Chatham Dockyard in 1845 and laid down that year, but cancelled in 1848.
- The fifth HMS Challenger (1858) was a screw corvette launched in 1858, converted to a survey ship in 1872 in preparation for her famous voyage, hulked in 1880, and sold for scrap in 1921. The research ship Glomar Challenger, the Apollo 17 lunar module and the Space Shuttle Challenger were named after this ship.
- The sixth HMS Challenger (1902) was a "second class cruiser" (a protected cruiser) of the Challenger class in service from 1902 to 1920.
- The seventh HMS Challenger (1931) was a survey ship launched in 1931 and broken up 1954.
- The eighth HMS Challenger (K07), the Royal Navy's first purpose-built ship for support of saturation diving missions, was launched in 1981 and sold in 1993.

== Battle honours ==
Ships named Challenger have earned the following battle honours:

- San Sebastian, 1813
- Cameroons, 1914

== See also ==
- Challenger
