= The Challenge =

The Challenge may refer to:

== Film ==
- The Challenge (1916 film), an American silent film starring Montagu Love
- The Challenge (1922 film), an American silent film directed by Tom Terriss
- The Challenge (1938 film), a mountain-climbing story starring Robert Douglas
- The Challenge (1948 film), an American film starring Tom Conway
- The Challenge (1958 film), an Italian film by Francesco Rosi, starring José Suárez
- The Challenge (1960 film), a British crime film featuring Jayne Mansfield and Anthony Quayle
- The Challenge (1970 film), starring Darren McGavin
- The Challenge... A Tribute to Modern Art, a 1974 documentary film
- The Challenge (1982 film), an action movie starring Scott Glenn and Toshirō Mifune
- The Challenge (2003 film), featuring the Olsen twins
- The Challenge (2011 film), based on the book by Jonathan Mahler
- The Challenge (2023 film), a Russian space drama film directed by Klim Shipenko
- Shart: The Challenge, a 2004 Indian Hindi-language romantic drama film by Puri Jagannadh, starring Tusshar Kapoor and Gracy Singh

== Television ==
=== Episodes ===
- "The Challenge", Arabian Knights episode 7 (1968)
- "The Challenge", Armchair Mystery Theatre series 3, episode 10 (1965)
- "The Challenge", Around the World in 80 Days with Michael Palin episode 1 (1989)
- "The Challenge", Arthur of the Britons series 1, episode 3 (1972)
- "The Challenge", Bananas in Pyjamas (2011) series 2, episode 47 (2012)
- "The Challenge", Barnaby Jones season 3, episode 3 (1974)
- "The Challenge", Brave Eagle episode 13 (1955)
- "The Challenge", Broken Arrow season 1, episode 18 (1957)
- "The Challenge", Falcon Crest season 2, episode 1 (1982)
- "The Challenge", Five Mile Creek season 2, episode 2 (1984)
- "The Challenge", Flipper (1995) season 3, episode 14 (1999)
- "The Challenge", Follyfoot series 3, episode 6 (1973)
- "The Challenge", Fraggle Rock season 1, episode 14 (1983)
- "The Challenge", Galactik Football season 1, episode 3 (2006)
- "The Challenge", Heidi season 1, episode 3 (2015)
- "The Challenge", High Stakes episode 5 (2001)
- "The Challenge", Ironside (1967) season 1, episode 20 (1968)
- "The Challenge", Iznogoud episode 23 (1995)
- "The Challenge", King Arthur and the Knights of Justice season 1, episode 8 (1992)
- "The Challenge", Lost in Space season 1, episode 22 (1966)
- "The Challenge", MacGyver (1985) season 4, episode 12 (1989)
- "The Challenge", My Parents Are Aliens series 2, episode 1 (2000)
- "The Challenge", Oggy and the Cockroaches season 6, episode 16c (2018)
- "The Challenge", Recess season 2, episode 5a (1998)
- "The Challenge", Richard the Lionheart episode 11 (1962)
- "The Challenge", Rules of Engagement season 3, episode 9 (2009)
- "The Challenge", Sealab 2020 episode 10 (1972)
- "The Challenge", Space Ghost episode 13b (1966)
- "The Challenge", Stormy Petrel episode 6 (1960)
- "The Challenge", The Adventures of Black Beauty series 2, episode 10 (1973)
- "The Challenge", The Adventures of Robin Hood series 1, episode 8 (1955)
- "The Challenge", The Alaskans episode 16 (1960)
- "The Challenge", The Big Valley season 3, episode 26 (1968)
- "The Challenge", The F.B.I. season 5, episode 8 (1969)
- "The Challenge", The Legend of William Tell episode 6 (1998)
- "The Challenge", The Magician (French) episode 13 (1998)
- "The Challenge", The Musketeers series 1, episode 8 (2014)
- "The Challenge", The Onedin Line series 2, episode 13 (1972)
- "The Challenge", The Rifleman season 1, episode 28 (1959)
- "The Challenge", The Virginian season 5, episode 6 (1966)
- "The Challenge", What's Happening Now!! season 1, episode 13 (1985)
- "The Challenge", Whirlybirds season 3, episode 9 (1959)
- "The Challenge", Yes Minister series 2, episode 2 (1982)
- "The Challenge", Zorro (1990) season 2, episode 11 (1990)

=== Shows ===
- The Challenge, the first installment in Legends of the Superheroes, a 1979 series of specials featuring the DC Comics characters

=== Series ===
- The Challenge (TV series), a reality game show originally on MTV and now on Paramount+, originally titled Real World/Road Rules Challenge
  - The Challenge: All Stars, a spinoff of the main Challenge series featuring cast members from previous seasons
  - The Challenge: USA, a 2022 spinoff series featuring former CBS reality contestants
  - The Challenge: Australia, a 2022 spinoff series featuring former Australian reality contestants and celebrities
- The Challenge (miniseries), a 1986 Australian mini series based on the 1983 America's Cup
- Squid Game: The Challenge, a British reality competition show

== Literature ==
=== Fiction ===
- The Challenge, a 1924 novel by Nat Gould
- The Challenge (novel), a 1952 Australian novel by E. V. Timms
- The Challenge, a 1953 novel by Phyllis Bottome
- The Challenge, a 1990 novel by Jerry Ahern, the eleventh installment in The Defender series
- The Challenge, a 1997 novel by Robert J. Randisi under the pen name J. R. Roberts, the 181st installment in the Clint Adams - The Gunsmith series
- The Challenge, a 1998 novel by Ben M. Baglio under the pen name Lucy Daniels, the second installment in the Jess the Border Collie series
- Steel Trapp: The Challenge, a 2008 young adult thriller novel by Ridley Pearson, the first installment in the Steel Trapp series

=== Non-fiction ===
- The Challenge: Liquor and Lawlessness versus Constitutional Government, a 1928 book by William Gibbs McAdoo
- The Challenge: Is the Church Obsolete?, a 1966 book by Ivan Southall
- The Challenge, a 1969 book by Billy Graham

== Other ==
- The Challenge (album), a 1968 Hampton Hawes recording
- "The Challenge", a song by Christine McVie from Christine McVie (album)
- The Challenge (game), a 1990 card game
- The Challenge (game show), a high school game show available to Cablevision customers
- The examination sat by entrants to Westminster School who are applying for a Queen's Scholarship
- Joel Casamayor vs. Juan Manuel Márquez, a 2008 professional boxing match

== See also ==
- Challenge (disambiguation)
- Challenger (disambiguation)
