= The Green Leaves of Summer (album) =

Studio album by Hampton Hawes
- Released: Early April 1964
- Recorded: February 17, 1964
- Studio: Contemporary Records Studio, Los Angeles
- Genre: Jazz
- Length: 39:19
- Label: Contemporary; M 3614/S 7614
- Producer: Lester Koenig

Hampton Hawes chronology
For Real! (1961)	The Green Leaves of Summer (1964)	Here and Now (1965)

The Green Leaves of Summer is an album by American jazz pianist Hampton Hawes recorded in 1964 and released on the Contemporary label.

== Reception ==
The AllMusic review by Scott Yanow states "Pianist Hampton Hawes' first recording after serving five years in prison finds Hawes evolving a bit from a Bud Powell-influenced bop pianist to one familiar with more modern trends in jazz... Recommended".

Professional ratings
Review scores
Source	Rating
AllMusic	4.5/5 stars
The Rolling Stone Jazz Record Guide	3/5 stars
The Penguin Guide to Jazz Recordings	3.5/4 stars

== Track listing ==
1. "Vierd Blues" (Miles Davis) – 5:28
2. "The Green Leaves of Summer" (Dimitri Tiomkin, Paul Francis Webster) – 6:18
3. "Ill Wind" (Harold Arlen, Ted Koehler) – 3:54
4. "St. Thomas" (Sonny Rollins) – 3:07
5. "Secret Love" (Sammy Fain, Paul Francis Webster) – 5:34
6. "Blue Skies" (Irving Berlin) – 5:19
7. "The More I See You" (Harry Warren, Mack Gordon) – 5:31
8. "G.K. Blues" (Hampton Hawes) – 4:08

== Personnel ==
- Hampton Hawes – piano
- Monk Montgomery – bass
- Steve Ellington – drums
