= Here and Now (Hampton Hawes album) =

Studio album by Hampton Hawes
- Released: 1966
- Recorded: May 12, 1965
- Studios: Contemporary Records Studio, Hollywood, CA
- Genre: Jazz
- Length: 38:44
- Label: Contemporary M3616/S7616
- Producer: Lester Koenig

Hampton Hawes chronology
The Green Leaves of Summer (1964)	Here and Now (1966)	The Challenge (1968)

Here and Now is an album by American jazz pianist Hampton Hawes recorded in 1965 and released on the Contemporary label.

== Reception ==
The Allmusic review by Scott Yanow called the album "interesting but not essential" and stated "In general, the treatments are somewhat straight-ahead ("The Girl from Ipanema" is taken as swing rather than bossa nova), and Hawes' solos transform some of the tunes a bit".

Professional ratings
Review scores
Source	Rating
Allmusic	3/5 stars
The Rolling Stone Jazz Record Guide	3/5 stars
The Penguin Guide to Jazz Recordings	3/4 stars

== Track listing ==
1. "Fly Me to the Moon" (Bart Howard) - 6:59
2. "What Kind of Fool Am I?" (Leslie Bricusse, Anthony Newley) - 4:42
3. "The Girl from Ipanema" (Antônio Carlos Jobim, Vinicius de Moraes, Norman Gimbel) - 4:06
4. "Rhonda" (Hampton Hawes) - 3:37
5. "Dear Heart" (Henry Mancini, Ray Evans, Jay Livingston) - 5:27
6. "People" (Jule Styne, Bob Merrill) - 5:05
7. "Chim Chim Cher-ee" (Richard M. Sherman, Robert B. Sherman) - 4:27
8. "Days of Wine and Roses" (Henry Mancini, Johnny Mercer) - 4:43

== Personnel ==
- Hampton Hawes - piano
- Chuck Israels - bass
- Donald Bailey - drums
