= Challenger Cup =

Challenger Cup may refer to:

- FIVB Men's Volleyball Challenger Cup, men's international volleyball competition organised by the Fédération Internationale de Volleyball
- FIVB Women's Volleyball Challenger Cup, women's international volleyball competition organised by the Fédération Internationale de Volleyball
- LEN Challenger Cup, men's water polo club competition organised by European Aquatics
- LEN Women's Challenger Cup, women's water polo club competition organised by European Aquatics
- ACC Men's Challenger Cup, men's Twenty20 International cricket competition organised by the Asian Cricket Council
- FIFA Challenger Cup, men's club football match organised by FIFA as part of the FIFA Intercontinental Cup competition

== See also ==
- Challenge Cup (disambiguation)
