= American Eagle Foundation =

Non-profit organization

- Abbreviation: AEF
- Formation: 1985
- Type: NGO
- Legal status: Non-profit Organization
- Headquarters: Pigeon Forge, Tennessee
- Coordinates: 35°48′32″N 83°32′18″W
- Region served: USA
- Official language: English
- Executive Director: Jessica Hall
- Revenue: $1,388,999 (2018)
- Expenses: $1,556,566 (2018)
- Website: www.eagles.org

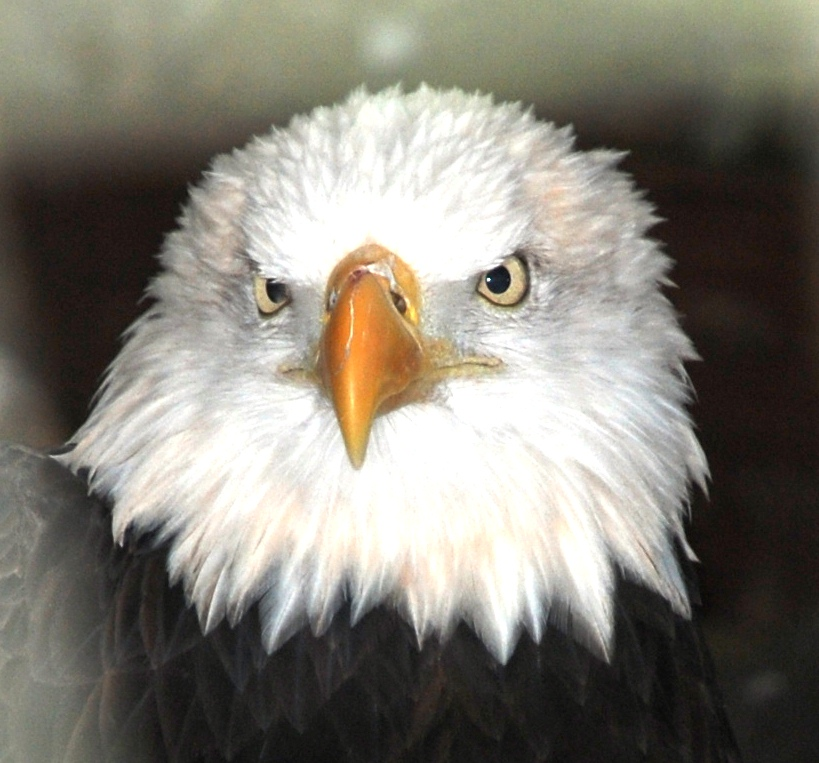
Bald eagle at Eagle Mountain Sanctuary in Dollywood theme park

The American Eagle Foundation (AEF) is a 501(c)(3) non-profit organization that supports the protection of the bald eagle and other birds of prey.

== History ==
Between 1961 and 1983, there were no successful bald eagle nests in the state of Tennessee, and the bald eagle was still listed as an endangered species by the federal government. Originally called the National Foundation to Protect America's Eagles, AEF was founded in 1985 to help conserve the bald eagle in Tennessee.

In 1990, AEF entered into a multi-year corporate partnership with the Dollywood Company and cooperated with them to develop Eagle Mountain Sanctuary at Dollywood in Pigeon Forge, Tennessee. Eagle Mountain Sanctuary is the largest gathering of non-releasable bald eagles in the world. The American Eagle Foundation also hosts the Wings of America flighted bird show for Dollywood in the Craftsman's Valley area of the Theme Park.

In 2019, AEF partnered with Yuengling. This partnership included limited-edition AEF Traditional Lager cans, a Bald Eagle nest cam sponsorship, and the release of a rehabilitated eaglet. This partnership with Yuengling has continued in 2022.

In 2021, the American Eagle Foundation broke ground on new headquarters in Kodak, Tennessee near the gateway to the Great Smoky Mountains. The new facility, code-named "Project Eagle," is 57 acres (23.07 ha). It will be equipped with an educational campus, several aviaries for resident raptors, an administrative building, and an avian research and rehabilitation center. In 2026, Lincoln, a 28-year-old bald eagle from the foundation, was featured in Budweiser's Super Bowl ad.

== Conservation efforts ==
AEF hosts cleanup events at waterways that may serve as bald eagle habitats. AEF has been known to partner with Keep Sevier Beautiful and Keep the Tennessee River Beautiful (state affiliate for Keep America Beautiful) for such events.

The American Eagle Foundation's bald eagle grant program, founded in 2012, awards approximately $100,000 in funding annually for bald eagle research. Grant applications are reviewed independently of AEF by a Bald Eagle Grant Advisory Team.

AEF has also partnered with Dollywood Theme Park and Keep the Tennessee River Beautiful to recycle guests' disposed cigarette butts and minimize such waste's impact on the Tennessee Watershed.

== Non-releasable raptor residents ==
The American Eagle Foundation cares for approximately 70 non-releasable raptors with various disabilities.

Challenger (eagle), a well-known bald eagle under AEF's care, performed free flights during the "Star Spangled Banner". Challenger has retired from free-flighted stadium events but continues to travel for other educational programs.

== Rehabilitation and captive breeding ==
The American Eagle Foundation's bald eagle propagation program has resulted in the release of over 180 bald eaglets and 11 golden eaglets from a Hack (falconry) tower on Douglas Lake. The hack tower is also used to support orphaned juvenile raptors. With the bald eagle successfully recovered, AEF has kept their original bald eagle pairs together, but no new pairs will be formed.

AEF is now home to a barn owl breeding pair to support declining barn owl populations in Tennessee.
