= Challenge Cup Competition of Science Achievement in China =

Peking University, Tsinghua University, Fudan University and Zhejiang University, initiated the "Challenge Cup" Competition of Science and Technology. It is reputed as the Chinese Olympics of science and technology among Chinese college students, covering the fields of management, social science, energy source subject, etc.

The Challenge Cup contest, initiated in 1989, has attracted submissions by about one million students from colleges and universities in Mainland China, Hong Kong, Macao, and Taiwan. As a national guide and authoritative competition, the Challenge Cup is known as the "Olympics" of science and technology for Chinese college students. It is also a window to show Chinese college students' creativity in science and technology and an arena to select students of high quality.
