= Challenger (eagle) =

American bald eagle

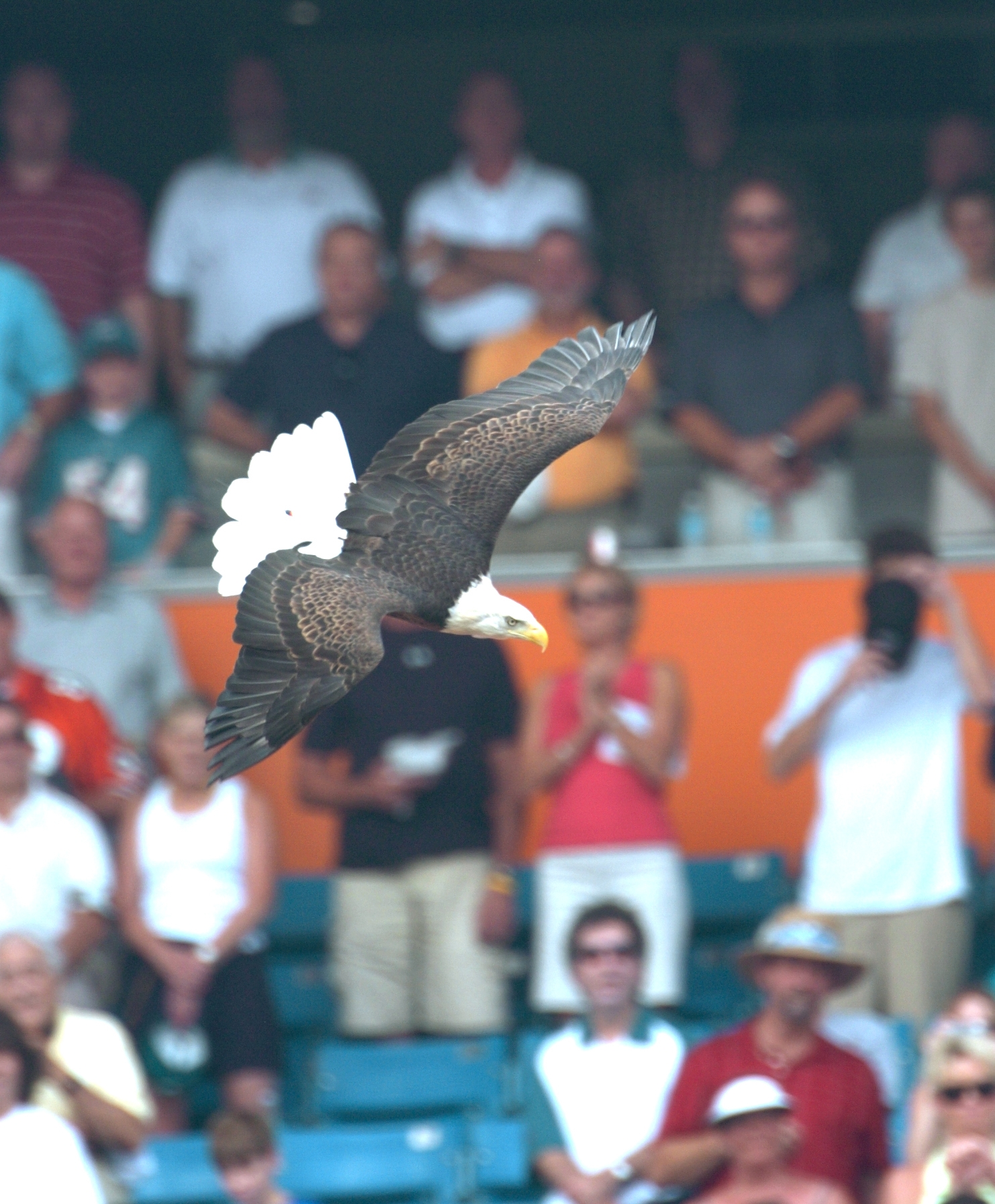
- Challenger the bald eagle soars over onlookers at a Miami Dolphins game
- Species: Haliaeetus leucocephalus
- Sex: Male
- Hatched: 1989
- Known for: First bald eagle trained to free fly over stadium events

Challenger is a non-releasable bald eagle in the care of the non-profit American Eagle Foundation. He is the first bald eagle in history trained to free fly over stadium events, including the World Series and United States presidential inaugurations.

== Life ==
At some point, during a storm in 1989, Challenger was blown from his nest as an eaglet. He was found and fed by well-meaning humans who placed him with a rehabilitation program. During his early years, he experienced too much human contact and imprinted on his human handlers. Two unsuccessful release attempts (including one that almost cost him his life) resulted in Challenger being deemed non-releasable, and he was eventually handed over to the Federal authorities. Authorities have since given Challenger to the American Eagle Foundation for care and educational programs. He lives with other birds of prey in Pigeon Forge, Tennessee. Challenger is named in honor of the space shuttle crew, who were killed when it disintegrated shortly after launch.

Challenger became the first bald eagle in U.S. history trained to free-fly into major sports stadiums, arenas, and ballrooms. Challenger has performed over 350 free flight demonstrations at major league and collegiate sporting events, conventions, trade shows, and fundraising galas across the U.S., plus hundreds of additional appearances and flights at schools and veterans homes.

His first major free flight was August 16th, 1996 Paralympics at the opening ceremony in the Olympic Stadium in Atlanta, GA. He flew down from the Olympic torch, circling a flag pole with the American flag as he came to his handler's glove. This was the first ever time a bald eagle had been free flown in an open stadium.

On July 2, 1999 AEF founder Al Cecere and Challenger were on the South Lawn of the White House with President Bill Clinton as Clinton encouraged Congress to approve a $1 billion Lands Legacy initiative which would preserve critical wildlife habitats and fund permanent financing for green spaces across the country. Clinton had announced the proposal to remove the bald eagle from the Endangered Species List earlier that day. After Clinton's speech, he reached behind Challenger to shake hands with some of the AmeriCorps youths that were there. As Clinton's hand came too close to Challenger's feet, Challenger nipped at him, but, luckily did no damage.

Due to Hawaii's strict rules about non-native species entering the state, Challenger is the only Bald Eagle to have ever gotten permission to visit there. He flew for the National Anthem in pre-game ceremonies of the 2002 (Feb. 9), 2003 (Feb. 2), and 2004 (Feb. 8) ProBowl games in Honolulu, and the governor declared a Challenger Day each of those years. While in Hawaii he also visited schools and the USS Arizona memorial.

In 2018, Challenger flew at the Mariners vs Twins baseball game at Target Field in Minneapolis, where he was supposed to fly to his handlers in the mound. He instead flew onto the shoulder of Mariners' pitcher James Paxton. A commemorative bobblehead of James Paxton with Challenger on his shoulder was released later that year.

Commemorative bobblehead of pitcher James Paxton with Challenger the bald eagle on his shoulder.

In 2019, on Challenger's 30th birthday, American Eagle Foundation announced that the eagle would be retired from free flights and make only gloved appearances. In June 2024 the eagle underwent successful cataract surgery.

== Awareness ==
Challenger has been an ambassador for his species since 1993. He has raised a great level of public awareness for the habitat destruction of the bald eagle. When the bald eagle was taken off the Endangered Species List in 2007, Challenger represented his species during the delisting ceremony at the White House.

Challenger is the only living, specific animal to have his name and likeness depicted on official U.S. mint. 750,000 half-dollar coins with Challenger featured on them were printed in 2008 to celebrate the recovery of the bald eagle population.

Commemorative silver half-dollar coin created in 2008 featuring the name and likeness of Challenger the bald eagle.

Challenger: America's Favorite Eagle is a children's book by Margot Theis Raven and illustrated by Gijsbert van Frankenhuyzen that was published in 2005 following the story of Challenger's early life and first free flight.

cover of children's book titled Challenger: America's Favorite Eagle by Margot Theis Raven and illustrated by Gijsbert van Frankenhuyen. Cover has an illustration of a bald eagle flying in front of an American flag.

== Performances ==
=== Sports events ===
- MLB World Series – 1998, 2000, 2001, 2002, 2003
- NFL Pro Bowl – 2002, 2003, 2004; NFC Championship Game - 2018
- Fiesta Bowl – 1999, 2013
- Men's Final Four – 2005
- NCAA College Football National Championship – 2011, 2017
- Daytona 500 – 2015
- Army-Tulane Football Game – 2015
- Arizona Cardinals–San Francisco 49ers Football Game – 2016
- Cotton Bowl Classic Bowl - 2017

=== Teams ===
- Atlanta Braves
- Arizona Cardinals
- Auburn University
- Boston College Eagles
- Philadelphia Eagles
- Chicago Cubs
- University of Connecticut
- San Francisco Giants
- Green Bay Packers
- Buffalo Bills
- Florida Marlins
- Indianapolis Colts
- Texas Rangers
- Kansas City Chiefs
- Minnesota Vikings
- New York Yankees
- Oklahoma State University
- Detroit Lions
- Tennessee Titans
- University of Kansas
- University of Tennessee
- Florida State University
- Louisiana State University
- Carson-Newman University
- Georgia Southern University
- United States Military Academy

=== Individual events ===
- 1996 Paralympics
- Disney's Animal Kingdom Grand Opening
- World War II Memorial groundbreaking ceremony
- White House ceremonies
- High Point University Graduation Ceremonies
- Ceremony delisting the bald eagle as an endangered species
- University of Kansas vs. University of Nebraska 3 NOV 2001
- 2007 Texas vs. Oklahoma State football game
- We Are One: The Obama Inaugural Celebration at the Lincoln Memorial, January 18, 2009
- October 2, 2010, Boston College vs. Notre Dame Football Game
- May 19, 2014, Boston College Commencement ceremony
- Horatio Alger Association Award Ceremony 2014
- HP Communications, Inc. Company Christmas Party- San Diego, CA- 2017

== See also ==
- List of individual birds
