= Challenger Colles =

Cluster of hills on Pluto

- Feature type: Hills
- Location: Eastern Sputnik Planitia, Pluto
- Coordinates: 23°03′N 195°06′E
- Dimensions: 30 km × 60 km
- Discoverer: New Horizons
- Naming: Space Shuttle Challenger

Challenger Colles is a range of hills on Pluto near the eastern edge of Sputnik Planitia. Discovered by the New Horizons team in July 2015, it is named in honor of the Space Shuttle Challenger, which was destroyed with all seven crew lost on January 28, 1986. The name Challenger Colles was officially approved by the International Astronomical Union on May 27, 2022.

Challenger Colles forms a roughly rectangular mass of blocks and mounts, each 1-5 km in diameter and up to several hundred meters high. It is part of a broader belt of scattered hills across Sputnik Planitia's eastern regions which may be fragments of water ice "bedrock" which were eroded from the neighboring bright highlands. Glacial action could then transport these blocks into Sputnik Planitia, as solid nitrogen is denser than water ice; Challenger Colles itself lies near a glacial "mouth", though it does not appear to have vigorous glacial flow at present.
