= Challenge Cup (disambiguation) =

The Challenge Cup is a British rugby league competition held annually since 1896.

Challenge Cup may also refer to:

== Australian football ==
- Challenge Cup (Australian rules football), a historic football competition in Australia during the late 1800s

== Figure skating ==
- International Challenge Cup

== Football (soccer) ==
- AFC Challenge Cup, a former football competition in the Asian Football Confederation
- CECAFA Cup, formerly the East and Central African Senior Challenge Cup
- Challenge Cup (Austria-Hungary) 1897–1911
- Challenge Trophy, in Canada
- Carolina Challenge Cup, in South Carolina, U.S.
- FA Cup, officially the Football Association Challenge Cup, in England
- Lebanese Challenge Cup
- Malaysia Challenge Cup
- National Challenge Cup, now U.S. Open Cup, in the U.S.
- Newfoundland and Labrador Challenge Cup, in Canada
- Nigeria FA Cup, or Challenge Cup
- Northern Premier League Challenge Cup, in England
- NWSL Challenge Cup, an American women's competition
- Scottish Challenge Cup
- 2024 Outrigger Challenge Cup
- 2025 Outrigger Challenge Cup

== Handball ==
- EHF Challenge Cup, now EHF European Cup

== Ice hockey ==
- Challenge Cup (UK ice hockey)
- Challenge Cup (ice hockey), an international tournament held annually in Canada
- 1979 Challenge Cup (ice hockey), between the Soviet Union and the National Hockey League
- IIHF Challenge Cup of Asia
- Dominion Hockey Challenge Cup, now Stanley Cup, the championship trophy of the National Hockey League in North America

== Rugby league ==
- Women's Challenge Cup, the women's version of the men's rugby league competition
- Wheelchair Challenge Cup, the wheelchair version of the men's rugby league competition

== Rugby union ==
- EPCR Challenge Cup, a European rugby union competition
- WRU Challenge Cup, a rugby union competition in Wales
- Yorkshire Cup (rugby union), originally the Yorkshire Challenge Cup, in England

== Volleyball ==
- CEV Challenge Cup, a European competition
- CEV Women's Challenge Cup, a European competition

== Research ==
- Challenge Cup Competition of Science Achievement in China

== See also ==
- Challenger Cup (disambiguation)
