= Challenger (company) =

Australian investment management firm

Challenger Limited
- Company type: Public
- Traded as: ASX: CGF; S&P/ASX 200 component; S&P/ASX 300 component
- Industry: Financial services
- Founded: 1985; 40 years ago
- Founders: Bill Ireland
- Headquarters: Sydney, New South Wales, Australia
- Key people: Duncan West (Chairman); Nick Hamilton (CEO)
- Products: Annuities; Fund management
- Net income: ▼ A$189.5 million (FY 2024)
- AUM: A$127 billion (June 2024)
- Total assets: ▲ A$33.41 billion (FY 2024)
- Total equity: ▼ A$3.89 billion (FY 2024)
- Number of employees: 676 (2024)
- Website: challenger.com.au

Challenger Limited (Challenger) is an Australian investment management company. It is publicly traded on the Australian Securities Exchange and is a constituent member of the S&P/ASX 200 and S&P/ASX 300 indices. It is largest provider of annuities in Australia.

== Background ==
Challenger was founded in 1985 by Bill Ireland who was previously a stockbroker and an art gallery owner. Originally, Challenger was established as a hotel management business.

Challenger held its initial public offering on the Australian Securities Exchange 10 days before Black Monday in 1987. Afterwards Ireland changed the direction of the company to focus on financial services.

In 1998, Kerry Packer and his son James Packer became investors of Challenger by acquiring a significant stake in the company through Consolidated Press Holdings. This helped fund Challenger's move into the annuities business as well as other investment management fields.

In 2002, Challenger acquired Credit Suisse First Boston's private-client broking business.

In 2003, Challenger merged with Packer's CPH Investment Corp to form a company worth A$1 billion. Ireland would eventually leave Challenger in the same year.

In 2009, Packer's Consolidated Press Holdings sold all of its ownership in Challenger which ended ties between the two.

In early 2021, Challenger acquired a banking unit named MyLife MyFinance from superannuation fund Catholic Super. In May 2024, the unit renamed to Challenger bank was sold to Heartland Bank.

In July 2021, Apollo Global Management via its insurance affiliate Athene acquired an 18% equity stake in Challenger. In September 2024, Apollo sold half of its stake in Challenger.

In October 2023, Challenger signed its first sponsorship deal in Australian sports where it would sponsor the PGA Tour of Australasia.
