= The Challenge (album) =

Studio album by Hampton Hawes
- Released: 1968
- Recorded: May 7, 9, 12, 1968
- Genre: Jazz
- Label: Victor

Hampton Hawes chronology
Here and Now (1965)	The Challenge (1968)	Jam Session (1968)

The Challenge is a solo piano album by Hampton Hawes. It was recorded in 1968 and released by Victor. It was his only solo album.

== Recording and music ==
The solo piano album was recorded in Tokyo on May 7, 9, and 12, 1968. The project was "a result of a Japanese producer's enthusiasm for Hawes's music."

The material includes jazz standards, the contemporary pop song "Who Can I Turn To?", and three Hawes originals. All except "Bags' Groove" are short performances. Hawes uses "contrapuntal left-hand lines, doubtless compensating for the absence of bass and drums."

== Release and reception ==
Professional ratings
Review scores
Source	Rating
AllMusic	4.5/5 stars
The Penguin Guide to Jazz	3/4 stars

The Challenge was released by Victor in Japan. The AllMusic reviewer concluded: "the pianist shows that he could create stirring music without the assistance of a rhythm section." The Penguin Guide to Jazz commented that the album was important for being Hawes's only solo release, and noted that even the unsuccessful performance of "Clementine" provided the listener with an insight into "Hawes's harmonic instincts and his fine structural intelligence."

== Track listing ==
1. "Hamp's Blues"
2. "Summertime"
3. "What's New?"
4. "It Could Happen to You"
5. "My Romance"
6. "Autumn Leaves"
7. "Just One of Those Things"
8. "Who Can I Turn To?"
9. "Bags' Groove"
10. "Clementine"
11. "Young People's Tune"
12. "Shinjuku"

== Personnel ==
- Hampton Hawes – piano
