= Space Shuttle Challenger =

Space Shuttle orbiter (1983–1986)

Challenger
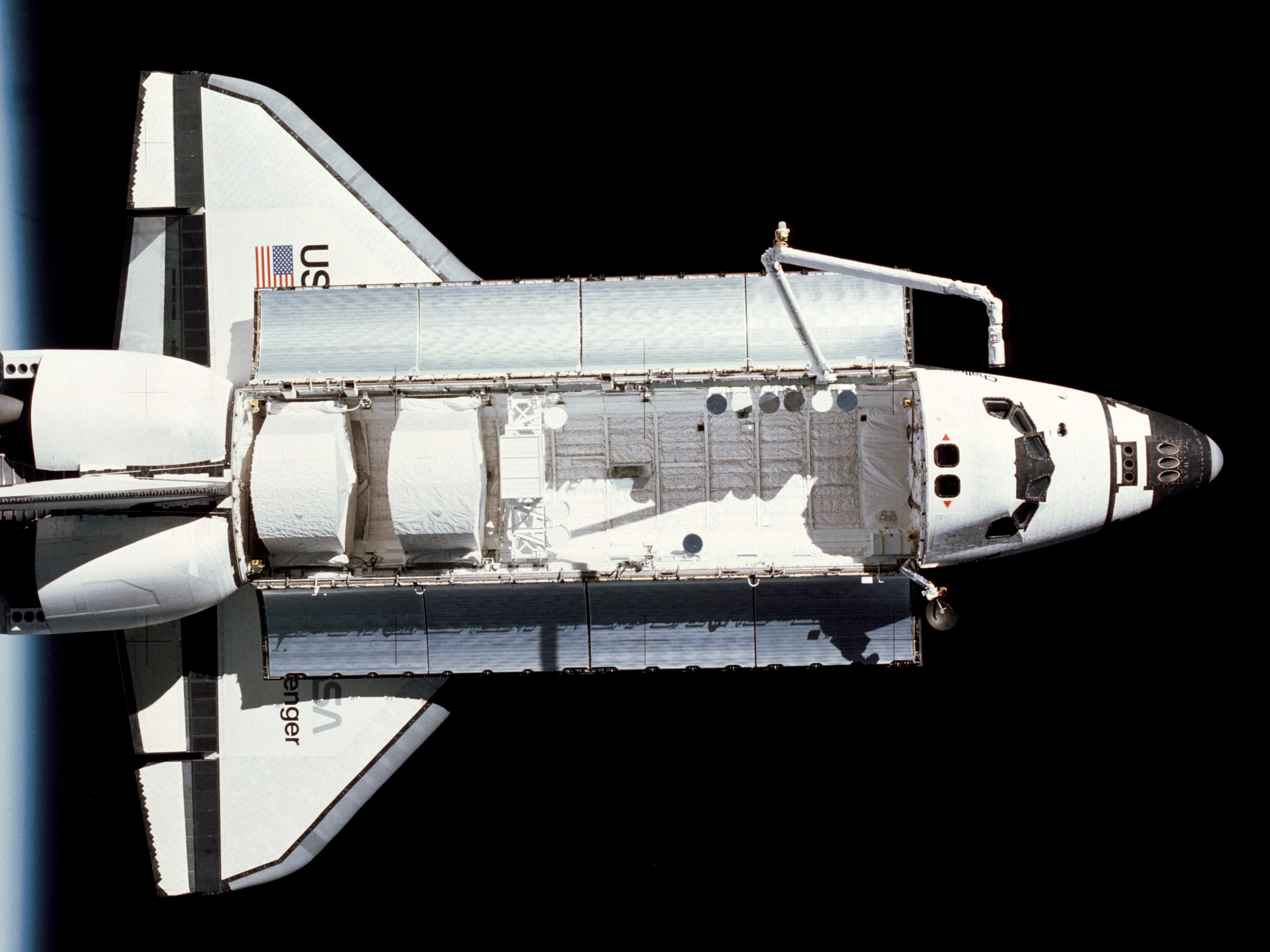
- Challenger in orbit in 1983, during STS-7
- Type: Spaceplane
- Class: Space Shuttle orbiter
- Eponym: HMS Challenger (1858)
- Serial no.: STA-099 (1978–1979); OV-099
- Owner: NASA
- Manufacturer: Rockwell International

Specifications
- Dry mass: 80,600 kilograms (177,700 lb)
- Rocket: Space Shuttle

History
- First flight: April 4–9, 1983; STS-6
- Last flight: January 28, 1986; STS-51-L
- Flights: 10
- Flight time: 1,496 hours
- Traveled: 41,527,414 kilometres (25,803,939 mi) around Earth
- Orbits: 995 around Earth
- Fate: Disintegrated during ascent

Space Shuttle orbiters

Space Shuttle Challenger (OV-099) was a Space Shuttle orbiter manufactured by Rockwell International and operated by NASA. Named after the commanding ship of a nineteenth-century scientific expedition that traveled the world, Challenger was the second Space Shuttle orbiter to fly into space after Columbia, and launched on its maiden flight in April 1983. It was destroyed in January 1986 soon after launch in a disaster that killed all seven crew members aboard.

Initially manufactured as a test article not intended for spaceflight, it was used for ground testing of the Space Shuttle orbiter's structural design. However, after NASA found that their original plan to upgrade Enterprise for spaceflight would be more expensive than upgrading Challenger, the orbiter was pressed into operational service in the Space Shuttle program. Lessons learned from the first orbital flights of Columbia led to Challenger's design possessing fewer thermal protection system tiles and a lighter fuselage and wings. This led to it being 2,200 pounds (1,000 kilograms) lighter than Columbia, though still 5,700 pounds (2,600 kilograms) heavier than Discovery.

During its three years of operation, Challenger was flown on ten missions in the Space Shuttle program, spending over 62 days in space and completing almost 1,000 orbits around Earth. Following its maiden flight, Challenger supplanted Columbia as the leader of the Space Shuttle fleet, being the most-flown orbiter during all three years of its operation while Columbia itself was seldom used during the same time frame. Challenger was used for numerous civilian satellite launches, such as the first tracking and data relay satellite, the Palapa B communications satellites, the Long Duration Exposure Facility, and the Earth Radiation Budget Satellite. It was also used as a test bed for the Manned Maneuvering Unit (MMU) and served as the platform to repair the malfunctioning SolarMax telescope. In addition, three consecutive Spacelab missions were conducted with the orbiter in 1985, one of which was the first German crewed spaceflight mission. Passengers carried into orbit by Challenger include the first American female astronaut, the first American female spacewalker, the first African-American astronaut, and the first Canadian astronaut.

On its tenth flight in January 1986, Challenger exploded 73 seconds after liftoff, killing the seven-member crew of STS-51-L that included Christa McAuliffe, who would have been the first teacher in space. The Rogers Commission concluded that an O-ring seal in one of Challenger's solid rocket boosters failed to contain pressurized burning gas that leaked out of the booster, causing a structural failure of Challenger's external tank and the orbiter's subsequent breakup due to aerodynamic forces. NASA's organizational culture was also scrutinized by the Rogers Commission, and the Space Shuttle program's goal of replacing the United States' expendable launch systems was cast into doubt. The loss of Challenger and its crew led to a broad rescope of the program including replacing it with Endeavour, and numerous aspects – such as launches from Vandenberg, the MMU, and Shuttle-Centaur – were scrapped to improve crew safety; Challenger and Atlantis were the only orbiters modified to conduct Shuttle-Centaur launches. The recovered remains of the orbiter are mostly buried in a missile silo located at Cape Canaveral LC-31; one piece is on display at the Kennedy Space Center Visitor Complex.

== History ==
Challenger was named after HMS Challenger, a British corvette that was the command ship for the Challenger Expedition, a pioneering global marine research expedition undertaken from 1872 through 1876. The Apollo 17 Lunar Module, which landed on the Moon in 1972, was also named Challenger.

=== Construction ===
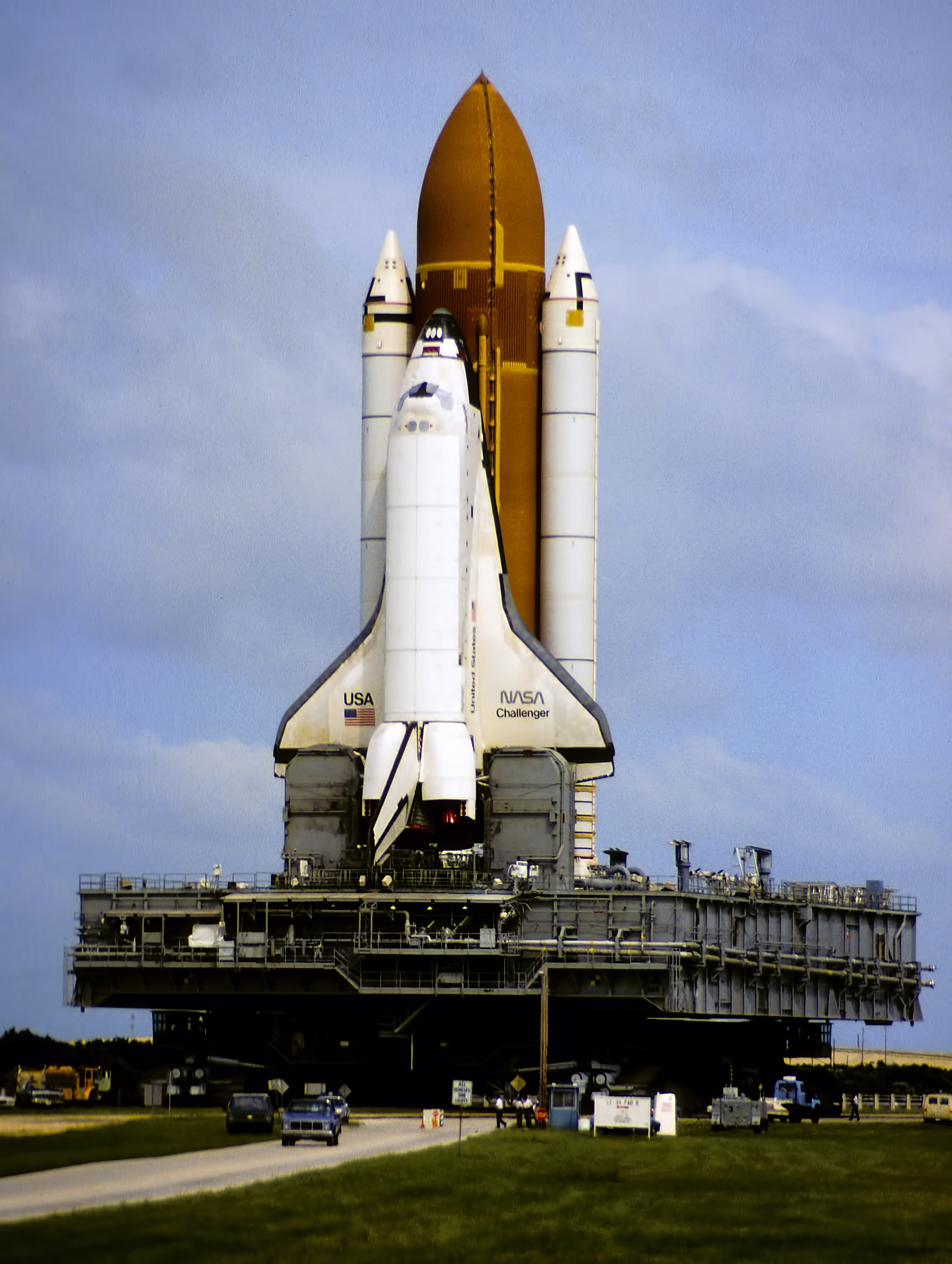
Challenger being prepared in 1985 for its penultimate flight, STS-61-A

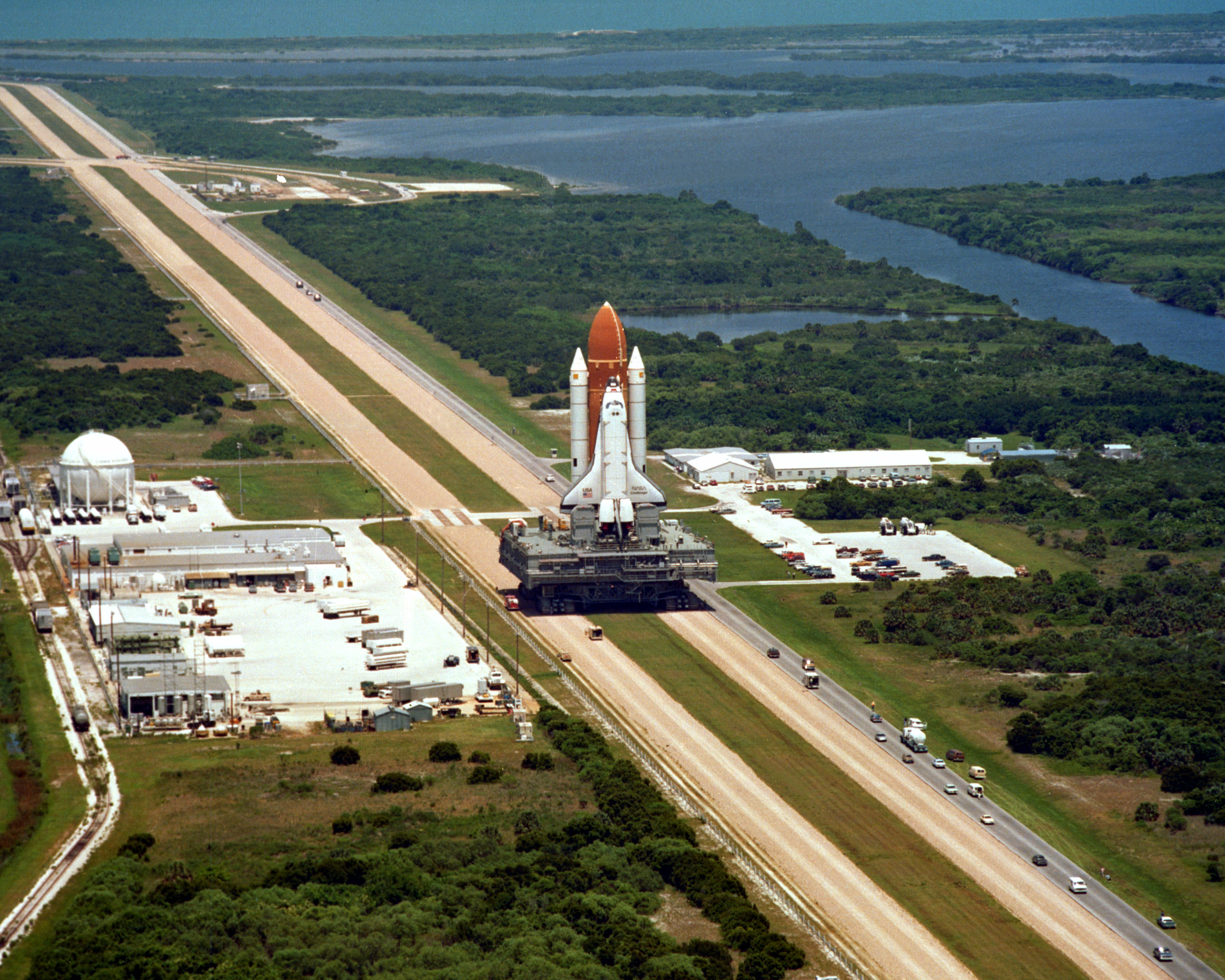
Challenger atop a Crawler-transporter, en route to the launch site for its final flight, STS-51-L

Because of the low production volume of orbiters, the Space Shuttle program decided to build a vehicle as a Structural Test Article, STA-099, that could later be converted to a flight vehicle. The contract for STA-099 was awarded to North American Rockwell on July 26, 1972, and construction was completed in February 1978. After STA-099's rollout, it was sent to a Lockheed test site in Palmdale, where it spent over 11 months in vibration tests designed to simulate entire shuttle flights, from launch to landing. To prevent damage during structural testing, qualification tests were performed to a safety factor of 1.2 times the design limit loads. The qualification tests were used to validate computational models, and compliance with the required 1.4 factor of safety was shown by analysis. STA-099 was essentially a complete airframe of a Space Shuttle orbiter, with only a mockup crew module installed and thermal insulation placed on its forward fuselage.

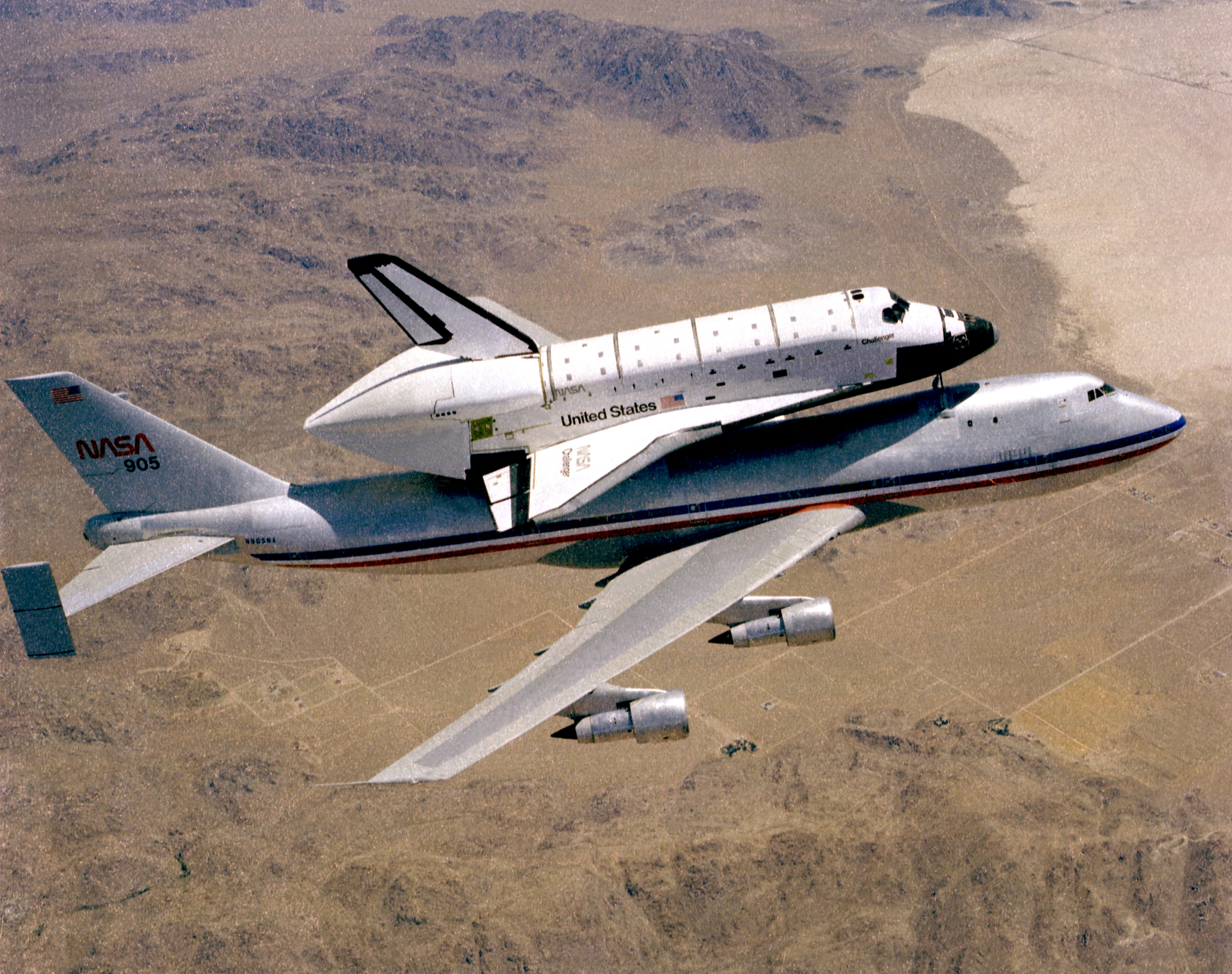
Challenger being transported by Shuttle Carrier Aircraft 905, shortly before being delivered in 1982

NASA planned to refit the prototype orbiter Enterprise (OV-101), used for flight testing, as the second operational orbiter; but Enterprise lacked most of the systems needed for flight, including a functional propulsion system, thermal insulation, a life support system, and most of the cockpit instrumentation. Modifying it for spaceflight was considered to be too difficult, expensive, and time-consuming. Since STA-099 was not as far along in the construction of its airframe, it would be easier to upgrade to a flight article. Because STA-099's qualification testing prevented damage, NASA found that rebuilding STA-099 into a flightworthy orbiter would be less expensive than refitting Enterprise. Work on converting STA-099 to operational status began in January 1979, starting with the crew module (the pressurized portion of the vehicle), as the rest of the vehicle was still being used for testing by Lockheed. STA-099 returned to the Rockwell plant in November 1979, and the original, unfinished crew module was replaced with the newly constructed model. Major parts of STA-099, including the payload bay doors, body flap, wings, and vertical stabilizer, also had to be returned to their individual subcontractors for rework. By early 1981, most of these components had returned to Palmdale to be reinstalled. Work continued on the conversion until July 1982, when the new orbiter was rolled out as Challenger.

Challenger, as did the orbiters built after it, had fewer tiles in its Thermal Protection System than Columbia, though it still made heavier use of the white LRSI tiles on the cabin and main fuselage than did the later orbiters. Most of the tiles on the payload bay doors, upper wing surfaces, and rear fuselage surfaces were replaced with DuPont white Nomex felt insulation. These modifications and an overall lighter structure allowed Challenger to carry 2,500 lb (1,100 kg) more payload than Columbia. Challenger's fuselage and wings were stronger and lighter than Columbia's. The hatch and vertical-stabilizer tile patterns were different from those of the other orbiters. Challenger was the first orbiter to have a heads-up display (HUD) system for use in the descent phase of a mission, and the first to feature Phase I main engines rated for 104% maximum thrust.

==== Construction milestones (as STA-099) ====
| Date | Milestone |
|---|---|
| July 26, 1972 | Contract Award to North American Rockwell |
| November 21, 1975 | Start structural assembly of crew module |
| June 14, 1976 | Start structural assembly of aft fuselage. |
| March 16, 1977 | Wings arrive at Palmdale from Grumman |
| September 30, 1977 | Start of Final Assembly |
| February 10, 1978 | Completed Final Assembly |
| February 14, 1978 | Rollout from Palmdale |

==== Construction milestones (as OV-099) ====
| Date | Milestone |
|---|---|
| January 5, 1979 | Contract Award to Rockwell International, Space Transportation Systems Division |
| January 28, 1979 | Start structural assembly of crew module |
| November 3, 1980 | Start of Final Assembly |
| October 23, 1981 | Completed Final Assembly |
| June 30, 1982 | Rollout from Palmdale |
| July 1, 1982 | Overland transport from Palmdale to Edwards |
| July 5, 1982 | Delivery to KSC |
| December 18, 1982 | Flight Readiness Firing (FRF) |
| January 25, 1983 | Second FRF (performed due to a hydrogen leak having occurring during the first FRF) |
| April 4, 1983 | First Flight (STS-6) |

=== Flights and modifications ===
1983 NASA documentary of the Space Shuttle Challenger first maiden flight and the deployment of the TRDS-1 satellite.

After its first flight in April 1983, Challenger quickly became the workhorse of NASA's Space Shuttle fleet, flying six of nine Space Shuttle missions in 1983 and 1984. Even when the orbiters Discovery and Atlantis joined the fleet, Challenger flew three missions a year from 1983 to 1985. Challenger, along with Atlantis, was modified at Kennedy Space Center to be able to carry the Centaur-G upper stage in its payload bay. If flight STS-51-L had been successful, Challenger's next mission would have been the deployment of the Ulysses probe with the Centaur to study the polar regions of the Sun.

Challenger flew the first American woman, African-American, Dutchman, and Canadian into space; carried three Spacelab missions; and performed the first night launch and night landing of a Space Shuttle.

=== Final mission and destruction ===
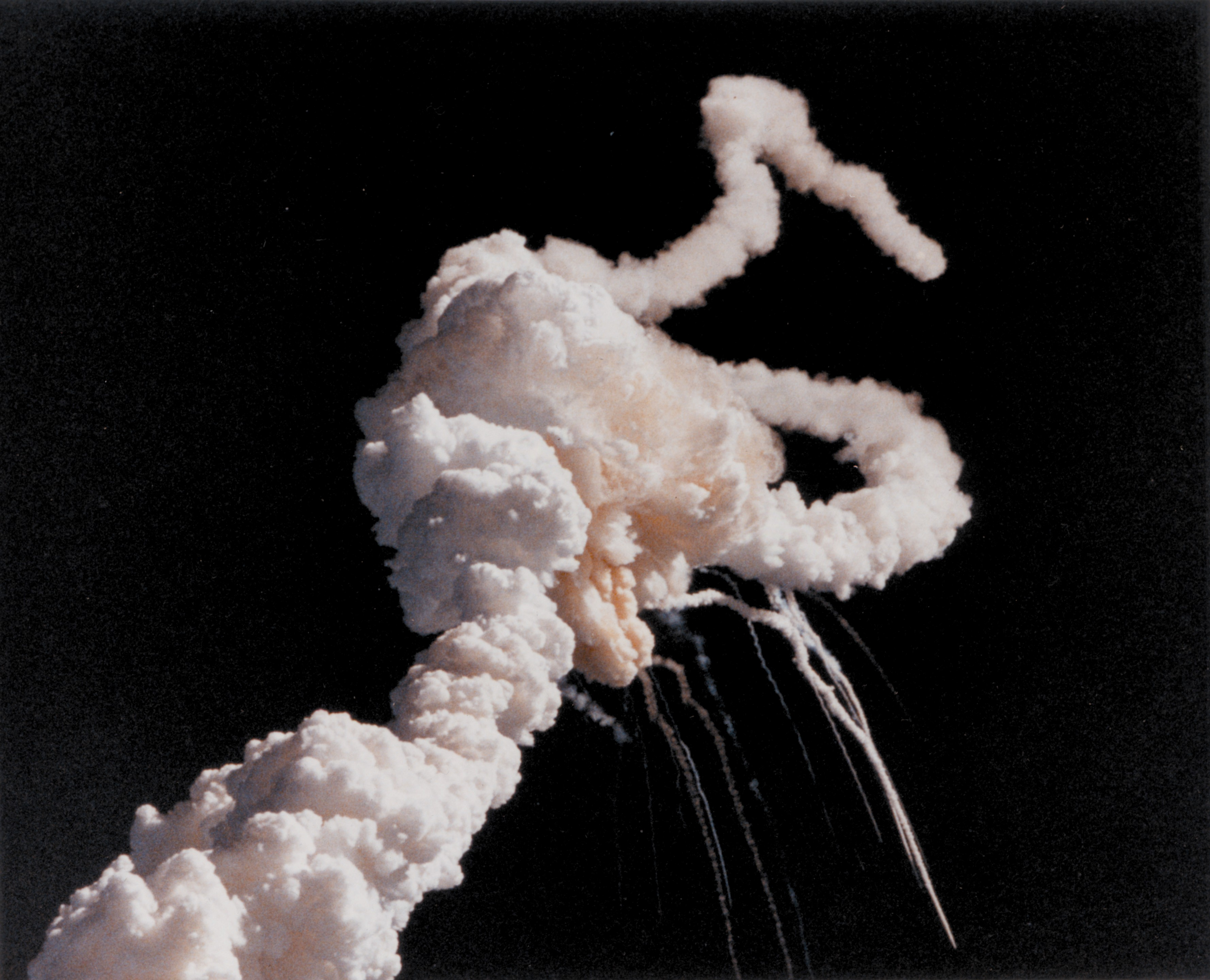
Challenger breaks apart after launch in 1986, killing all crew on board, including Christa McAuliffe, a teacher with the NASA Teacher in Space Project

STS-51-L was the orbiter's tenth and final flight, initially planned to launch on January 26, 1986 (after several technical and paperwork delays). The mission attracted huge media attention, as one of the crew was a civilian schoolteacher, Christa McAuliffe, who was assigned to carry out live lessons from the orbiter (as part of NASA's Teacher in Space Project). Other members would deploy the TDRS-B satellite and conduct comet observations.

Challenger blasted off at 11:38 am EST on January 28, 1986. Just over a minute into the flight, a faulty booster joint opened up, leading to a flame that melted securing struts which resulted in a catastrophic structural failure and explosion of the External Tank. The resulting pressure waves and aerodynamic forces destroyed the orbiter, resulting in the loss of all of the crew.

Challenger was the first Space Shuttle to be destroyed in a mission disaster. The collected debris of the vessel is currently buried in decommissioned missile silos at Launch Complex 31, Cape Canaveral Air Force Station. A section of the fuselage recovered from Space Shuttle Challenger can also be found at the "Forever Remembered" memorial at the Kennedy Space Center Visitor Complex in Florida. Debris from the orbiter sometimes washes up on the Florida coast. This is collected and transported to the silos for storage. Because of its early loss, Challenger was the only Space Shuttle that never wore the NASA "meatball" logo, and was never modified with the MEDS "glass cockpit". The tail was never fitted with a drag chute, which was fitted to the remaining orbiters in 1992. Challenger and sister ship Columbia are the only two shuttles that never visited the Mir Space Station or the International Space Station. In September 2020 Netflix released Challenger: The Final Flight, a four-part miniseries created by Steven Leckart and Glen Zipper documenting the tragedy firsthand.

=== Lawsuits ===
In March 1988 the federal government and Morton Thiokol Inc. agreed to pay $7.7 million in cash and annuities to the families of four of the seven Challenger astronauts as part of a settlement aimed at avoiding lawsuits in the nation's worst space disaster, according to government documents. Morton Thiokol, the company that manufactured the faulty solid rocket booster that caused the accident, paid 60 percent, $4,641,000. The remainder, $3,094,000, was paid by the government.

In September 1988 a federal judge dismissed two lawsuits seeking $3 billion from Space Shuttle rocket-maker Morton Thiokol Inc. by Roger Boisjoly, a former company engineer who warned against the ill-fated 1986 Challenger launch.

== List of missions ==
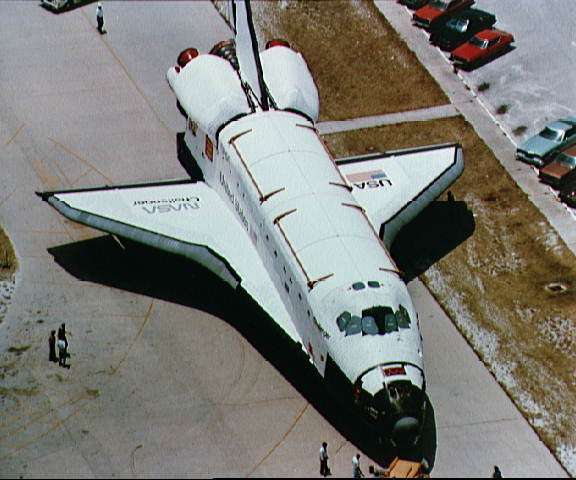
Challenger rolls out from the Orbiter Processing Facility (OPF) to the Vehicle Assembly Building (VAB) in 1983

Challenger served as structural test article STA-099 before being retrofitted as an orbiter

| # | Date | Designation | Launch pad | Landing location | Notes | Mission duration |
|---|---|---|---|---|---|---|
| 1 | April 4, 1983 | STS-6 | LC-39A | Edwards, Runway 22 | Deployed TDRS-A. First spacewalk during a Space Shuttle mission. | 5 days, 00 hours, 23 minutes, 42 seconds |
| 2 | June 18, 1983 | STS-7 | LC-39A | Edwards, Runway 15 | Sally Ride becomes first American woman in space. Deployed two communications satellites, including Anik C2. | 6 days, 02 hours, 23 minutes, 59 seconds |
| 3 | August 30, 1983 | STS-8 | LC-39A | Edwards, Runway 22 | Guion Bluford becomes first African-American in space. First shuttle night launch and night landing. Deployed INSAT-1B. Carried 261,900 envelopes stamped to commemorate the 25th Anniversary of NASA, most of which were sold to the public. | 6 days, 01 hours, 08 minutes, 43 seconds |
| 4 | February 3, 1984 | STS-41-B | LC-39A | Kennedy, Runway 15 | First untethered spacewalk using the Manned Maneuvering Unit. Deployed WESTAR and Palapa B-2 communications satellites unsuccessfully (both were retrieved during STS-51-A). | 7 days, 23 hours, 15 minutes, 55 seconds |
| 5 | April 6, 1984 | STS-41-C | LC-39A | Edwards, Runway 17 | Solar Maximum Mission service mission. | 6 days, 23 hours, 40 minutes, 07 seconds |
| 6 | October 5, 1984 | STS-41-G | LC-39A | Kennedy, Runway 33 | First mission to carry two women. Marc Garneau becomes first Canadian in space. Kathryn D. Sullivan becomes first American woman to make a spacewalk. Deployed Earth Radiation Budget Satellite. | 8 days, 05 hours, 23 minutes, 33 seconds |
| 7 | April 29, 1985 | STS-51-B | LC-39A | Edwards, Runway 17 | Carried Spacelab-3. | 7 days, 00 hours, 08 minutes, 46 seconds |
| 8 | July 29, 1985 | STS-51-F | LC-39A | Edwards, Runway 23 | Carried Spacelab-2. Only STS mission to abort after launch. | 7 days, 22 hours, 45 minutes, 26 seconds |
| 9 | October 30, 1985 | STS-61-A | LC-39A | Edwards, Runway 17 | Carried German Spacelab D-1. Wubbo Ockels becomes the first Dutchman in space. | 7 days, 00 hours, 44 minutes, 51 seconds |
| 10 | January 28, 1986 | STS-51-L | LC-39B | Did not land (planned to land at Kennedy, Runway 33). | First mission to have a private citizen in space (Christa McAuliffe). Broke up after launch, killing all seven astronauts on board. Would have deployed TDRS-B. | 0 days, 00 hours, 01 minute, 13 seconds |

== Mission and tribute insignias ==
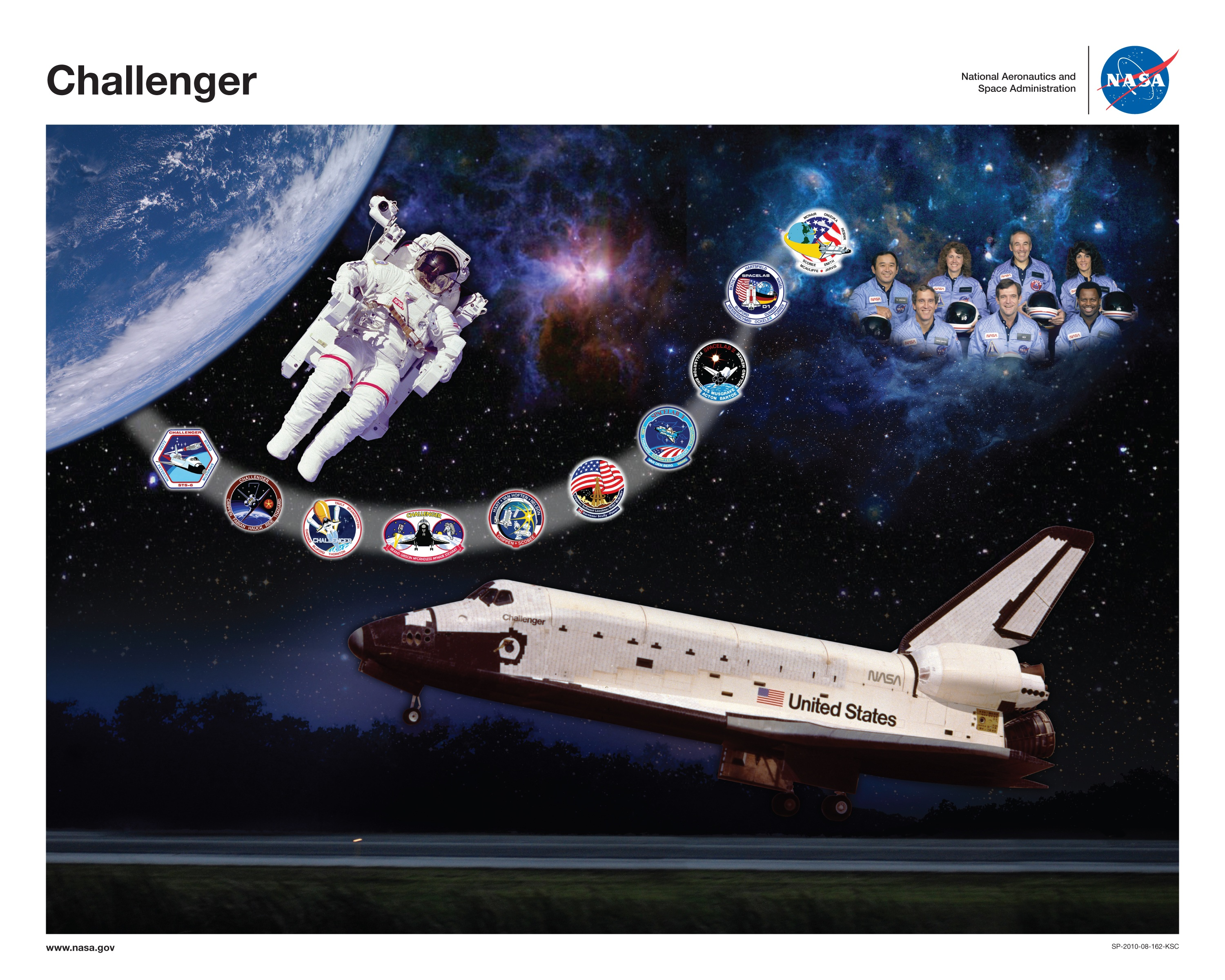
NASA Orbiter Tribute for Space Shuttle Challenger

Mission insignia for Challenger flights
| STS-6 | STS-7 | STS-8 | STS-41-B | STS-41-C | STS-41-G |
| STS-51-B | STS-51-F | STS-61-A | STS-51-L | STS-61-F* | |

* Mission canceled due to loss of Challenger on STS-51-L.

== See also ==
- List of human spaceflights
- List of Space Shuttle crews
- List of Space Shuttle missions
- Timeline of Space Shuttle missions
- List of human spaceflights chronologically
- Challenger flag
- Challenger Colles, mountain range on Pluto named for the Space Shuttle
