= Coach's challenge =

Coach's challenge may refer to:

- Replay review in gridiron football
- The rule allowing teams to challenge fouls in basketball
- Instant replay in Major League Baseball
- The rule allowing teams to challenge goals and disallowed goals in ice hockey
