= List of classic female blues singers =

The following is a list of classic female blues singers.

== A ==
- Mozelle Alderson
- Ora Alexander

== B ==
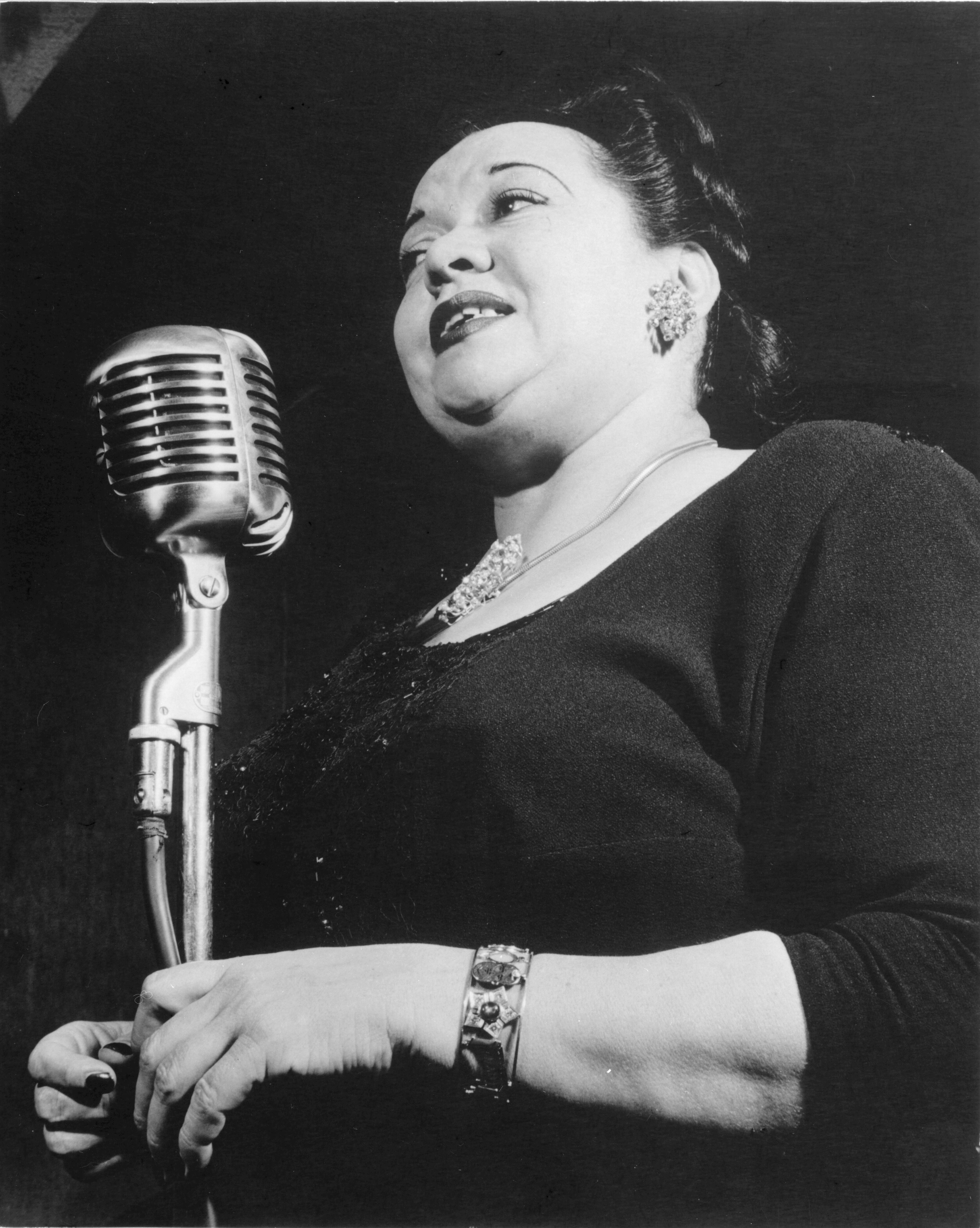
Mildred Bailey

- Mildred Bailey
- Blue Lu Barker
- Gladys Bentley
- Esther Bigeou
- Lucille Bogan
- Ada Brown
- Bessie Brown
- Eliza Brown
- Kitty Brown

== C ==
- Alice Carter
- Alice Leslie Carter
- Martha Copeland
- Ida Cox
- Katie Crippen

== D ==
- Madlyn Davis
- Mattie Dorsey

== E ==
- Bernice Edwards

== F ==
- Ethel Finnie
- Miss Frankie

== G ==
- Cleo Gibson
- Lillian Glinn
- Lillian Goodner
- Ida Goodson
- Fannie May Goosby
- Coot Grant
- Helen Gross

== H ==
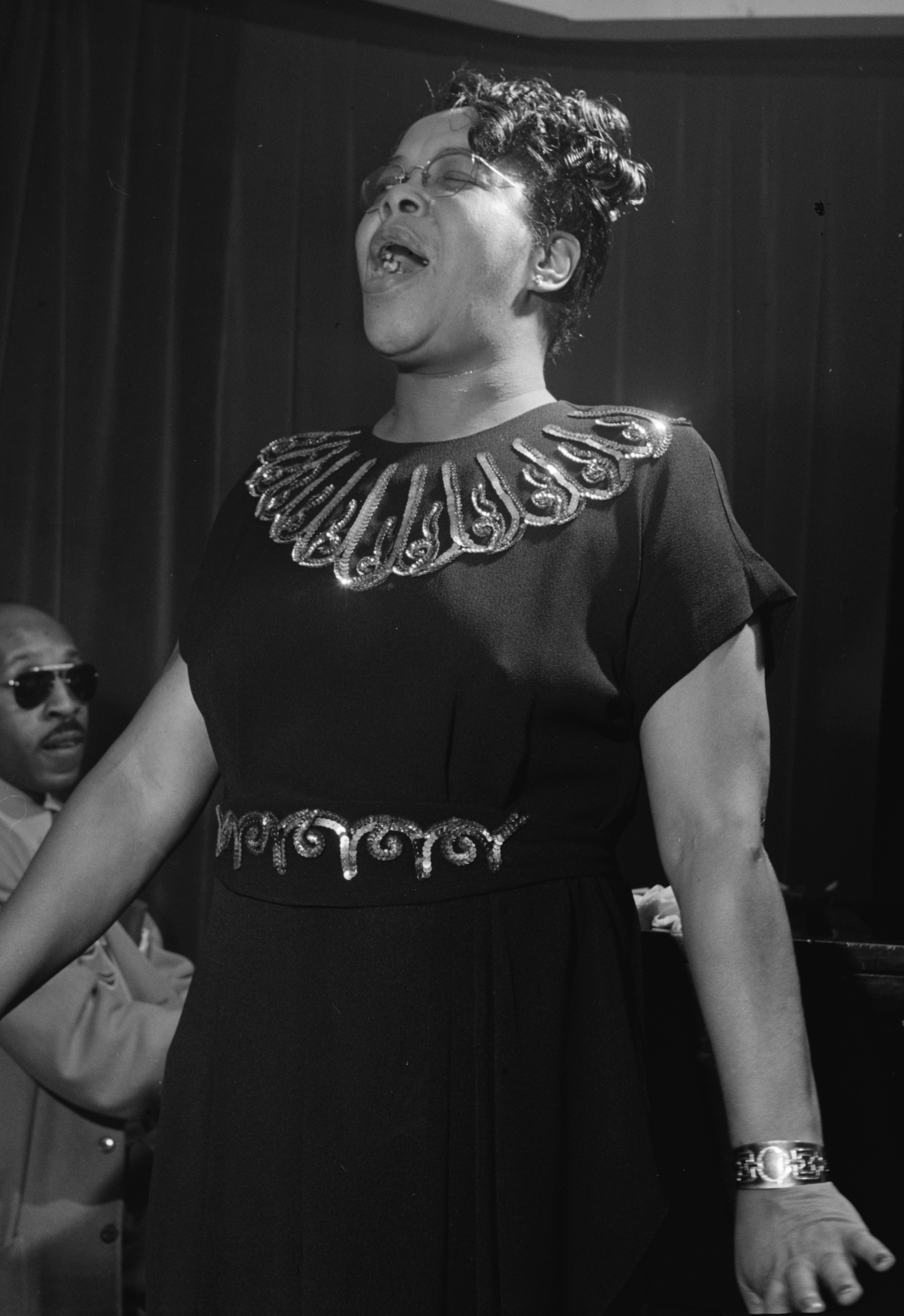
Bertha "Chippie" Hill

- Marion Harris
- Lucille Hegamin
- Edmonia Henderson
- Katherine Henderson
- Rosa Henderson
- Edna Hicks
- Bertha "Chippie" Hill
- Mattie Hite
- Rosetta Howard
- Helen Humes
- Alberta Hunter

== I ==
- Bertha Idaho

== J ==
Sara Martin with Sylvester Weaver

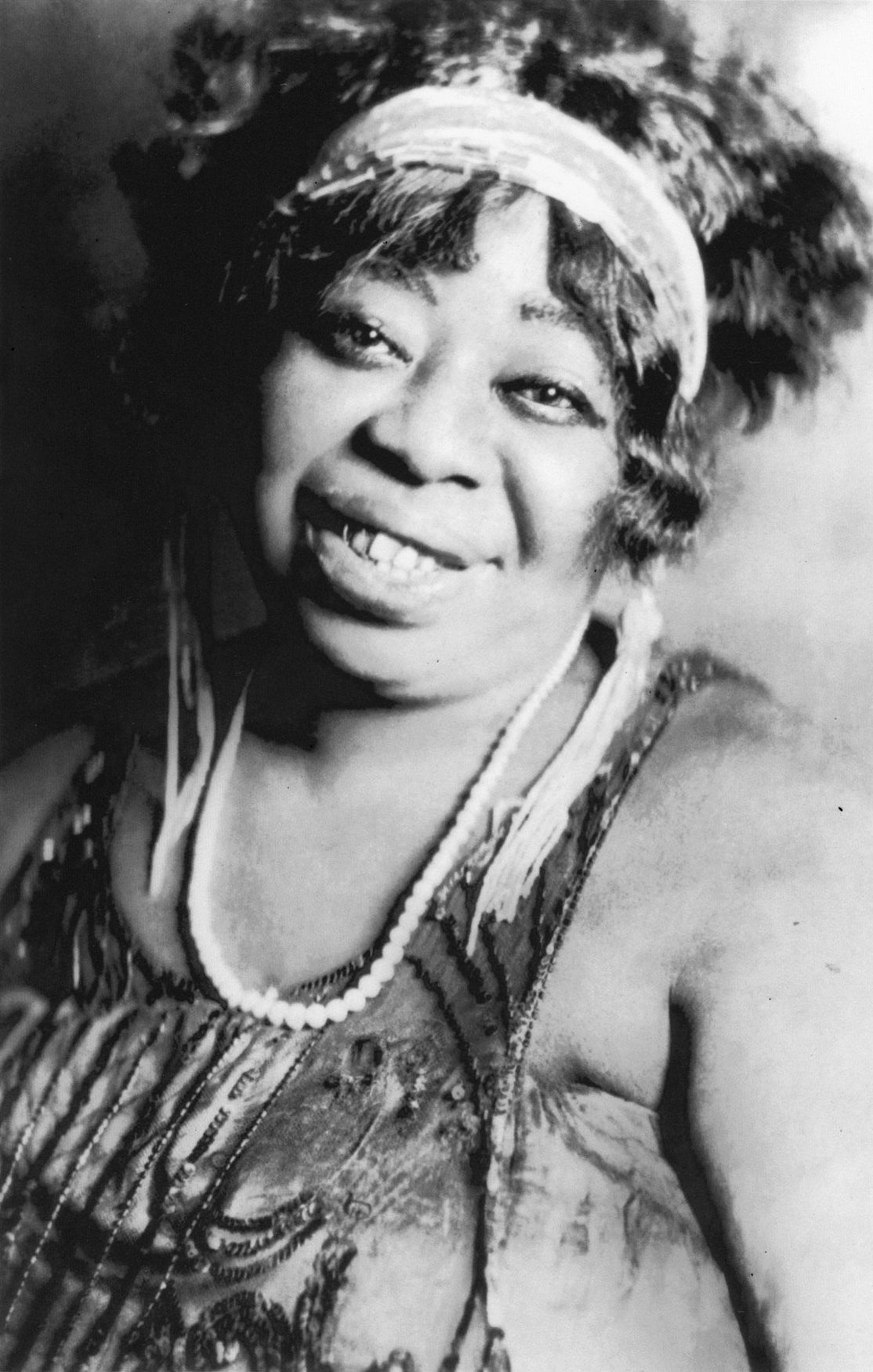
Ma Rainey

- Edith North Johnson
- Lil Johnson
- Mary Johnson
- Merline Johnson
- Maggie Jones

== L ==
- Virginia Liston

== M ==
- Ida May Mack
- Daisy Martin
- Sara Martin
- Viola McCoy
- Hazel Meyers
- Josie Miles
- Lizzie Miles
- Monette Moore

== R ==
- Ma Rainey
- Elzadie Robinson

== S ==
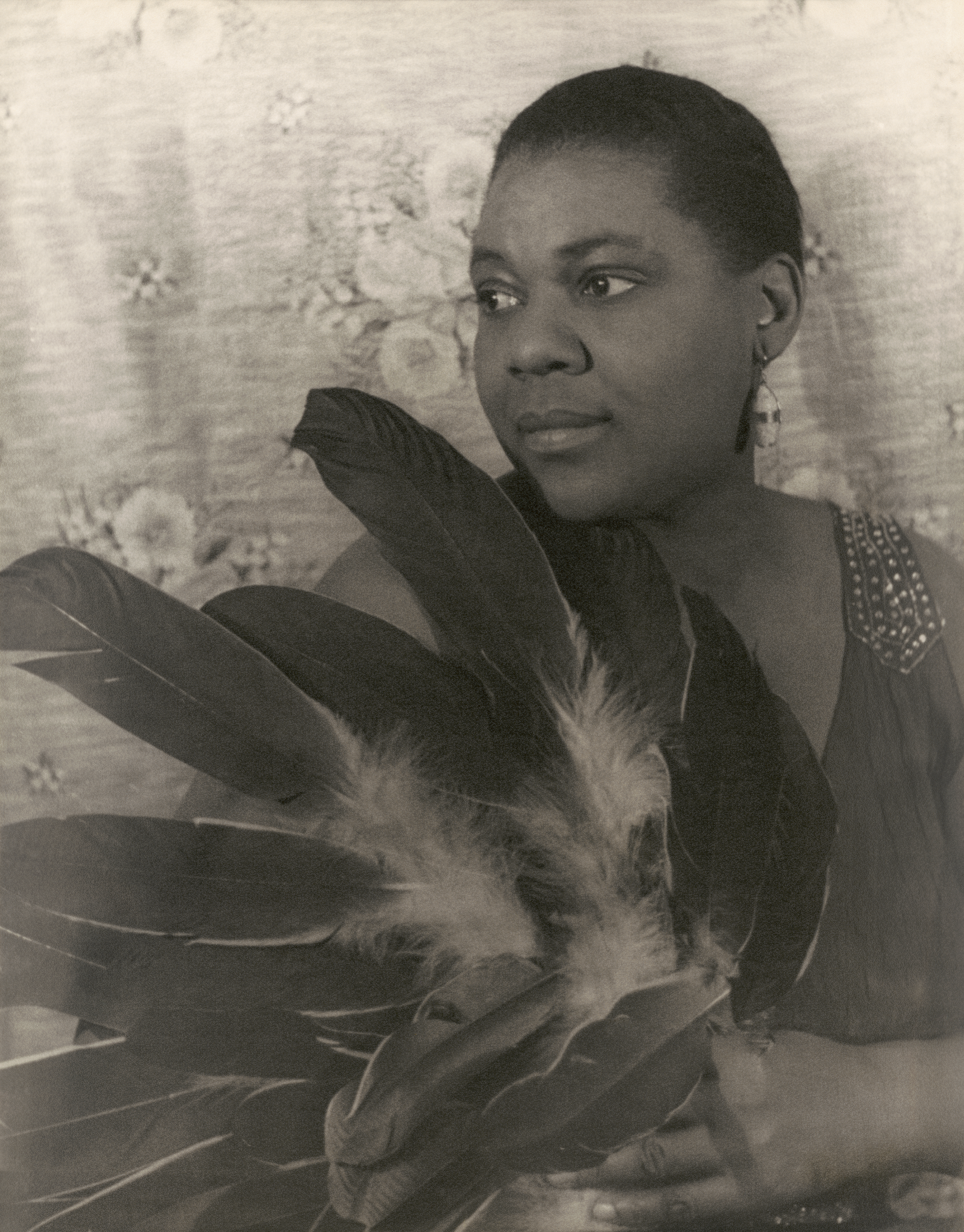
Bessie Smith

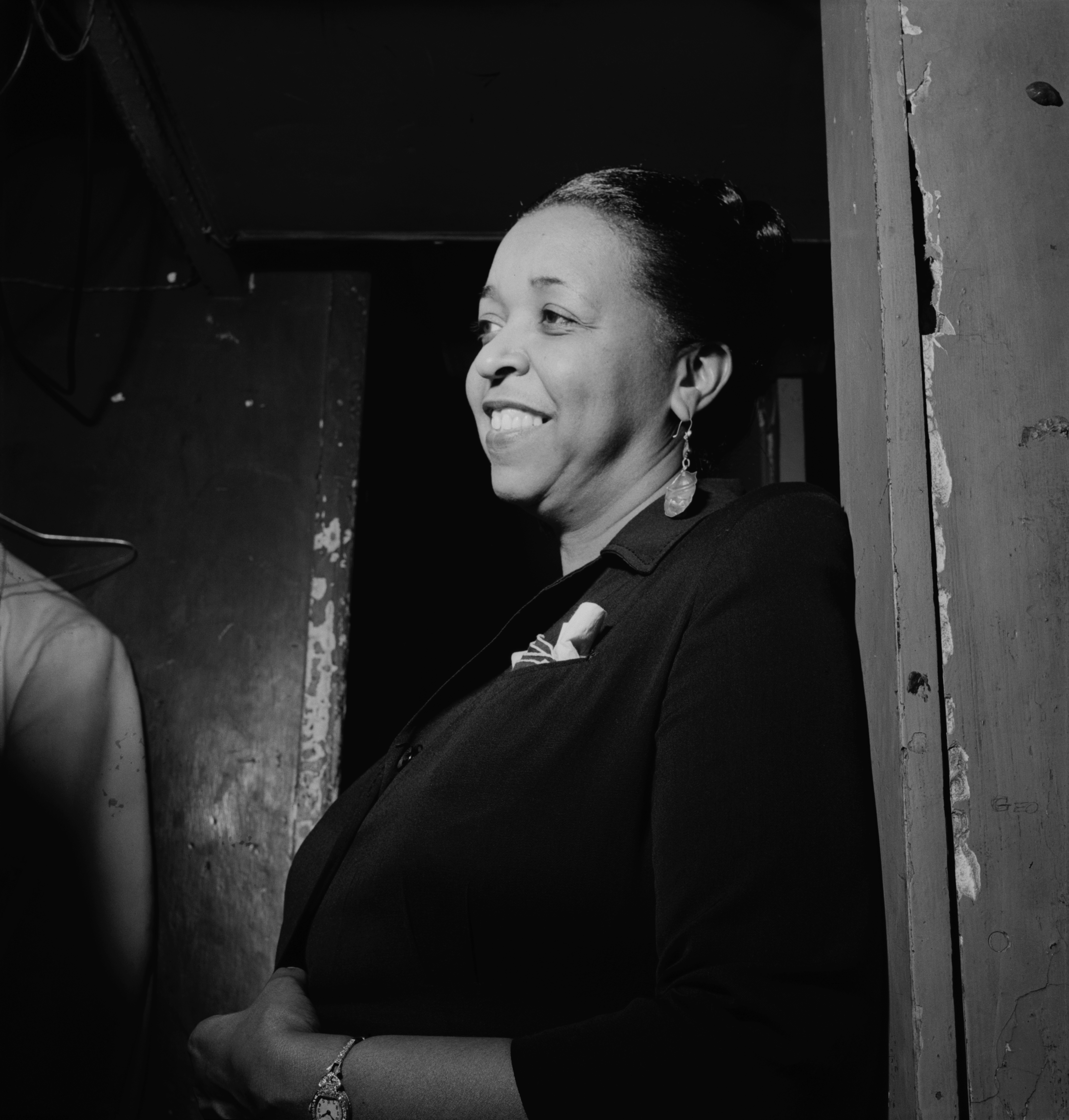
Ethel Waters

- Bessie Smith
- Clara Smith
- Laura Smith
- Mamie Smith
- Ruby Smith
- Trixie Smith
- Victoria Spivey
- Mary Stafford
- Hannah Sylvester

== T ==
- Eva Taylor
- Bessie Tucker
- Lavinia Turner

== W ==
- Sippie Wallace
- Ethel Waters
- Georgia White
- Edith Wilson
- Lena Wilson

== Y ==
- Estelle Yancey

== See also ==
- Women in music
