= Lavinia Turner =

American singer

- Born: c. 1888; Virginia
- Died: After 1937
- Genres: Classic female blues
- Occupation: Singer
- Instrument: Vocals
- Years active: 1921–1922
- Labels: Pathé Actuelle, Perfect, Okeh Records

Lavinia Turner (c. 1888 – after 1937) was an American classic female blues singer. Originally a vaudeville vocalist, Turner recorded 10 songs in 1921 and 1922, making her one of the first female blues singers to be recorded.

Details of her life outside the recording studio are minimal.

== Biography ==
Turner was born in Virginia, to parents from Virginia, around 1888. She was living in New York City, making her living as a performer, by 1920.

Her first recordings, almost certainly in March 1921, were of "How Many Times?" and "Can't Get Lovin' Blues", with piano accompaniment, possibly by Willie Gant. It is thought that Clarence Williams played the piano on two of her other recordings. Gus Aiken (trumpet) was also credited on recording sessions with Turner in 1921. Turner was thus one of the first black women to sing blues on recordings, which were made in New York City. However, also in 1921, other blues singers, such as Lillyn Brown, Lucille Hegamin, and Daisy Martin, all made records. Six of Turner's sides, including "When the Rain Turns into Snow (Who's Gonna Keep You Warm)" and "Who'll Drive Your Blues Away", were with piano accompaniment by James P. Johnson. They were originally issued on both Pathé Actuelle Records and Perfect Records. At least two of her tracks were issued by Okeh Records.

Two of the songs that Turner recorded, "Watch Me Go" and "He Took It Away from Me", were written by Roy Turk and J. Russel Robinson.

Turner's brief recording career finished in October 1922. In 1930, she was living as a widow in New York, and may be the person of that name who made a Social Security application in 1937.

Her work has appeared on various compilation albums, including Female Blues 1921–1928 (Document Records, 1997), which includes "When the Rain Turns into Snow (Who's Gonna Keep You Warm)" and "Who'll Drive Your Blues Away". In 1994, Document Records issued an anthology incorporating all of her known recorded work, together with the later recordings of Virginia Liston.

== Discography ==
- Virginia Liston, Complete Recorded Works in Chronological Order, vol. 2 (1924–1926), with Lavinia Turner, Complete Recorded Works in Chronological Order (1921–1922), Document Records, 2000.

== See also ==
- List of classic female blues singers
