= Madlyn Davis =

American blues singer

- Also known as: Red Hot Shakin' Davis
- Born: 1899–1901
- Origin: United States
- Genres: Classic female blues
- Occupation: Singer
- Instrument: Vocals
- Years active: 1920s
- Labels: Paramount

Madlyn Davis (born c. 1899 – c. 1901) was an American classic female blues singer, active as a recording artist in the late 1920s. Among her best-known tracks are "Kokola Blues" and "It's Red Hot". She was a contemporary of better-known recording artists, such as Ma Rainey, Bessie Smith, Clara Smith, Mozelle Alderson, Victoria Spivey, Sippie Wallace, and Bertha "Chippie" Hill. Little is known of her life outside music. However, copyright entries for some of her songs indicate that she lived at an address in the Bronzeville neighborhood of Chicago in 1925.

== Career ==
Davis made ten recordings in Chicago for Paramount Records. Her first session took place in June 1927. With accompaniment from the Red Hot Shakers, who likely included Cassino Simpson on piano, Davis recorded "Worried Down with the Blues" and "Climbing Mountain Blues." She recorded "Hurry Sundown Blues" and "Landlady's Footsteps" in September of that year, followed by another two songs in November. Her backing trio now included Richard M. Jones, and "Kokola Blues" laid part of the foundations for the more famous song "Sweet Home Chicago." The refrain of "Kokola Blues" includes these lyrics:

And it's hey, hey baby, baby don't you want to go
Back to that eleven light city, back to sweet Kokomo [sic]

The other track recorded at the same session was "Winter Blues", noteworthy for Davis's spoken exhortation to her musicians to "swing", as they duly increased the tempo of the song.

In October 1928, Davis had her final recording session, with backing by Georgia Tom Dorsey on piano and Tampa Red on guitar. They recorded four songs: "Gold Tooth Mama Blues," "Death Bell Blues," "Too Black Bad," and "It's Red Hot." On the latter she was billed as Red Hot Shakin' Davis. However, her propensity to speed up the tempo on recordings did not continue, and she missed out on the subsequent development of swing and rhythm and blues, which may have better suited her style.

Two alternate versions of "Worried Down with the Blues" plus her "Hurry Sundown Blues," "Climbing Mountain Blues," "Landlady's Footsteps," "Winter Blues," and "Kokola Blues" were included on the compilation album Female Blues Singers, Vol. 5: C/D/E (1921–1928), released in 1997 by Document Records.

== See also ==
- List of classic female blues singers
