= Laura Smith (American singer) =

American blues singer

- Born: Loretta Bryant; March 1882; Illinois or Indianapolis, United States
- Died: February 1932 (age 49) Los Angeles, California, United States
- Genres: Classic female blues, country blues
- Occupation: Singer
- Instrument: Vocals
- Years active: 1924–1927 (recording career)
- Labels: Okeh, Victor

Laura Smith (March 1882 – February 1932) was an American classic female blues and country blues singer. Songs she recorded include "Gonna Put You Right in Jail" and her version of "Don't You Leave Me Here". She led Laura Smith and her Wild Cats and also worked with Clarence Williams and Perry Bradford. Details of her life outside the music industry are scanty.

== Biography ==
The researchers Bob Eagle and Eric LeBlanc state that she was born Loretta Bryant in Illinois in 1882. Other sources suggest that she was born in Indianapolis, Indiana, at an unknown date. In the early 1920s, she toured the Theater Owners Booking Association circuit. Her recording career started in 1924 with Okeh and ended just three years later, when she recorded some tracks for Victor. The music journalist Scott Yanow noted that her earliest recordings were her strongest: "by the time she recorded 'Don't You Leave Me Here' in 1927, much of the power was gone". Her recordings include two songs, "The Mississippi Blues" and "Lonesome Refugee", about the Great Mississippi Flood of 1927. She recorded a total of 35 songs.

It was reported that by 1926 Smith was married to Slim Jones, a comedian, and was living in Baltimore.

Her most notable number, "Don't You Leave Me Here", was made more famous in a version recorded by Jelly Roll Morton some ten years later.

Smith died of long-term effects of hypertension in February 1932 in Los Angeles.

All her available recordings have been released on CD by Document Records (see below).

She was unrelated to the singers Mamie Smith, Bessie Smith, Clara Smith and Trixie Smith. She is also not to be confused with the Canadian folk singer-songwriter Laura Smith.

== Discography ==
=== Compilation albums ===
Album title	Record label	Year of release
Complete Recorded Works in Chronological Order, vol. 1, 1924–1927, Laura Smith	Document Records	1996
Complete Recorded Works in Chronological Order, vol. 2, 1923–1927, Edna Hicks, Hazel Meyers, Laura Smith	Document Records	1996

== See also ==
- List of classic female blues singers
- List of country blues musicians
