= Alice Leslie Carter =

American singer

- Origin: United States
- Genres: Classic female blues
- Occupation: Singer
- Instrument: Vocals
- Years active: 1921

Alice Leslie Carter was an American classic female blues singer, active as a recording artist in the early 1920s. Her best-known tracks are "Decatur Street Blues" and "Aunt Hagar's Children Blues". She was a contemporary of the better-known recording artists Ma Rainey, Bessie Smith, Clara Smith, Victoria Spivey, Sippie Wallace, and Bertha "Chippie" Hill. Little is known of her life outside music.

She is not to be confused with Alice Carter, another blues singer, who recorded four songs in 1923.

== Career ==
Carter recorded eleven sides in 1921, with musical accompaniment led by James P. Johnson on piano. She recorded at a time when record labels were keen to sign anyone capable of singing a blues song, such was the market demand. Some of these performers were less than capable, but Carter's work showed her strong vocal abilities. Her output included the first vocalised recording of the W. C. Handy and Tim Brymn song "Aunt Hagar's Children Blues."

On January 20, 1922, Carter competed in a blues-singing contest with Lucille Hegamin, Daisy Martin, and Trixie Smith (the eventual winner) at the Manhattan Casino in New York City. In the printed programme she was billed as "The International Blues Star", from which the musicologist David Evans inferred that she may have toured in Europe with an American band after World War I.

All of her recorded output was included on the compilation album Female Blues Singers, Vol. 4: C (1921–1930), released in 1997 by Document Records.

== Recordings ==
Recorded in New York City circa August 1921, issued by Arto Records, Globe, Bell, Hy-Tone, and Cleartone

- "Dangerous Blues"
- "I Want Some Lovin' Blues"
- "The Also Ran Blues"
- "Cry Baby Blues"
- "You'll Think of Me Blues"

Recorded in New York City circa September 1921, issued by Arto Records, Globe, Bell Records, Hy-Tone, and Cleartone

- "Aunt Hagar's Children Blues"
- "Down Home Blues"

Recorded in New York City circa November 1921, issued by Arto Records, Globe, Bell Records, Hy-Tone, and Cleartone

- "Decatur Street Blues"
- "Got to Have My Daddy Blues"

== See also ==
- List of classic female blues singers
