= Document Records =

Austrian record label

- Founded: 1985
- Founder: Johnny Parth
- Distributor(s): Allegro Music (US); Proper Music (UK)
- Genre: Blues, jazz
- Country of origin: Scotland
- Location: Newton Stewart
- Official website: www.document-records.com

Document Records is an independent record label, founded in Austria and now based in Scotland, that specializes in reissuing vintage blues and jazz. The company has been recognised by The Blues Foundation, being honoured with a Keeping the Blues Alive Award in 2018. Document Records is the only UK-based recipient of the award.

== History ==
Document was established in 1986 by Johnny Parth, the former owner of Roots Records, in Austria to make previously unreleased blues and gospel records from before the 1942–44 musicians' strike available on a number of European labels. In 1990, Parth felt obliged to switch production from LP to CD. With this change, he consolidated the catalogue into complete reissues in chronological order, increasingly on the Document label as other label names were dropped. The new policy was to reissue as many as possible of the recordings listed in the book, Blues and Gospel Records: 1890–1943. The scope was expanded to include bluegrass, spirituals, jazz, and other rural American genres (collectively known as roots music), made between 1900 and 1945. Since 2000 it has been owned by Gary and Gillian Atkinson and is based in Newton Stewart, Scotland.

Document has the exclusive rights to a great deal of unreleased music and other audio media produced by Edison Records between 1914 and 1929.

== Artists ==
- Ora Alexander
- Albert Ammons
- Pink Anderson
- Kokomo Arnold
- Josephine Baker
- Kid Bailey
- Barbecue Bob
- Blue Lu Barker
- Ed Bell
- Gladys Bentley
- Big Maceo
- Esther Bigeou
- Binkley Brothers' Dixie Clodhoppers
- Black Ace
- Scrapper Blackwell
- Blind Blake
- Lucille Bogan
- Ishmon Bracey
- Big Bill Broonzy
- Ada Brown
- Bessie Brown
- Cleo Patra Brown
- Gabriel Brown
- Kitty Brown
- Rabbit Brown
- Burnett & Rutherford
- Butterbeans and Susie
- Gus Cannon
- Leroy Carr
- Fiddlin' John Carson
- Alice Leslie Carter
- Bo Carter
- Baby Doo Caston
- Doctor Clayton
- Sam Collins
- Martha Copeland
- Floyd "Dipper Boy" Council
- Ida Cox
- Katie Crippen
- Arthur Crudup
- James Crutchfield
- Leroy Dallas
- Cow Cow Davenport
- Blind Gary Davis
- Blind John Davis
- Madlyn Davis
- Walter Davis
- Georgia Tom Dorsey
- Little Buddy Doyle
- David "Honeyboy" Edwards
- Sleepy John Estes
- William Ezell
- Ethel Finnie
- Fisk University Jubilee Singers
- Baby Face Leroy Foster
- Miss Frankie
- Blind Boy Fuller
- Bill Gaither
- Lawrence Gellert
- Jazz Gillum
- Lillian Glinn
- Lillian Goodner
- Lil Green
- Helen Gross
- Harlem Hamfats
- Kelly Harrell
- Hattie Hart
- Lucille Hegamin
- Rosa Henderson
- Edna Hicks
- Bertha "Chippie" Hill
- King Solomon Hill
- Mattie Hite
- Smokey Hogg
- Lightnin Hopkins
- Son House
- Rosetta Howard
- Peg Leg Howell
- Alberta Hunter
- Mississippi John Hurt
- Bertha Idaho
- Jim Jackson
- New Orleans Willie Jackson
- Skip James
- Frankie "Half-Pint" Jaxon
- Blind Lemon Jefferson
- Monkey Joe
- Bunk Johnson
- Lil Johnson
- Lonnie Johnson
- Margaret Johnson
- Mary Johnson
- Merline Johnson
- Robert Johnson
- Tommy Johnson
- Blind Willie Johnson
- Curtis Jones
- Maggie Jones
- Charley Jordan
- Lottie Kimbrough
- Rube Lacey
- Lead Belly
- Meade "Lux" Lewis
- Charley Lincoln
- Virginia Liston
- Robert Lockwood, Jr.
- Cripple Clarence Lofton
- Eddie Mapp
- Daisy Martin
- Sara Martin
- Tommy McClennan
- Charlie McCoy
- Kansas Joe McCoy
- Viola McCoy
- Hattie McDaniel
- Charlie "Specks" McFadden
- Barrelhouse Buck McFarland
- Brownie McGhee
- Blind Willie McTell
- Memphis Minnie
- Hazel Meyers
- Josie Miles
- Lizzie Miles
- Mississippi Sheiks
- Little Brother Montgomery
- Monette Moore
- Buddy Moss
- Muddy Waters
- Romeo Nelson
- Reverend A. W. Nix
- Paul Oliver
- Kid Ory
- Pace Jubilee Singers
- Charlie Patton
- Robert Petway
- Joe Pullum
- Ma Rainey
- Fiddlin' Doc Roberts
- Banjo Ikey Robinson
- Elzadie Robinson
- Walter Roland
- Bayless Rose
- Dan Sane
- Irene Scruggs
- Ollie Shepard
- Johnny Shines
- J.D. Short
- Henry "Son" Sims
- Bessie Smith
- Clara Smith
- Laura Smith
- Mamie Smith
- Ruby Smith
- Trixie Smith
- Charlie Spand
- Pinetop Sparks
- Victoria Spivey
- Mary Stafford
- Sunnyland Slim
- Roosevelt Sykes
- Hannah Sylvester
- Blind Joe Taggart
- Tampa Red
- Eva Taylor
- Montana Taylor
- Johnny Temple
- Sonny Terry
- Sister Rosetta Tharpe
- Elvie Thomas
- Henry Thomas
- Hociel Thomas
- Jesse Thomas
- Ramblin' Thomas
- Henry Townsend
- Bessie Tucker
- Blind Willie Walker
- Sippie Wallace
- Wesley Wallace
- Washboard Sam
- Curley Weaver
- Casey Bill Weldon
- Peetie Wheatstraw
- Bukka White
- Georgia White
- Josh White
- Bert Williams
- Big Joe Williams
- Sonny Boy Williamson I
- Sonny Boy Williamson II
- Ralph Willis
- Edith Wilson
- Lena Wilson
- Bill Wyman
- Jimmy Yancey
- Mama Yancey

== See also ==
- Lists of record labels
