= Mattie Dorsey =

- Genres: Classic female blues; country blues
- Occupation: Singer
- Instrument: Vocals
- Years active: 1910s–1920s
- Label: Paramount

Mattie Dorsey was an American classic female blues and country blues singer. She recorded four sides for Paramount Records in mid-1927, and had a career in vaudeville in the 1910s and 1920s. Little is known of her life outside of the entertainment business.

== Biography ==
No details appear to exist regarding her early life. It has been recorded that Mattie Dorsey had been active in black vaudeville since 1910, perhaps earlier. There is some evidence that Dorsey was originally part of the Whitman Sisters act, although she left them in 1910. She retained the Whitman surname for publicity purposes for several more years. In 1919, Pinetop Smith appeared alongside "Mattie Dorsey's Big Four" at a show in Memphis, Tennessee.

Another then stalwart of the black entertainment scene was the pianist Troy C(alvin) Snapp. He was an early accompanist of Ma Rainey. From 1926 to 1929, he led the Whitman Sisters Musical Comedy Road Show. He also backed Dorsey on her four sides recorded in 1927. Those four tracks were released as two singles, for Paramount Records, although details of her later life are unknown. "Oh Wasn't It Nice" and "Mattie Blues" were recorded at Marsh Laboratories, in Chicago, Illinois, around August, 1927. Mattie Dorsey, again with piano accompaniment from Troy Snapp supplied a two further tracks the next month – also released by Paramount – "Stingaree Blues" and "Love Me Daddy Blues". Her lengthy tenure in the business in 1927 saw her advertised as "an old time star". This is partly explained by the fact that Dorsey earned a living in the mid-1920s as a male impersonator.

In addition, she was mentioned in the publication, The New Paramount Book of the Blues by Alex van der Turk, published by Agram Blues Books (2017).

== Discography ==
=== Singles ===
Date	Title	Record label
August 1927	"Oh Wasn't It Nice" b/w "Mattie Blues"	Paramount Records
September 1927	"Stingaree Blues" b/w "Love Me Daddy Blues"	Paramount Records

=== Compilation albums ===
Year	Title	Record label
1997	Barrelhouse Woman Volume 2 (1924–1928)	Document Records

== See also ==
- List of classic female blues singers
