= Elzadie Robinson =

American blues singer

- Also known as: Bernice Drake; Blanche Johnson; Elzadie Henderson
- Born: Elzadie Wallace; April 24, 1897 (or 1900); Logansport, DeSoto Parish, Louisiana, United States
- Died: January 17, 1975 (age 74–77) Flint, Michigan, United States
- Genres: Classic female blues
- Occupations: Singer, songwriter
- Instrument: Vocals
- Years active: 1926–1929
- Labels: Paramount, Broadway

Elzadie Robinson (possibly April 24, 1897 – January 17, 1975) was an American classic female blues singer and songwriter. She recorded 34 songs between 1926 and 1929. Unusually for the time, she composed or co-composed most of her work. Few details of her life outside the recording studio are known.

AllMusic noted that "Robinson was a second-level blues singer whose voice seemed to get stronger with time".

== Biography ==
The music researchers Bob Eagle and Eric S. LeBlanc suggest that she was born Elzadie Wallace in Logansport, DeSoto Parish, Louisiana, in 1897, but 1900 is also possible.

She relocated to Chicago to make her recordings and remained in the city for some while thereafter. Her recordings were made between 1926 and 1929. Robinson had different piano accompanists over that period, including Bob Call and her most regular accompanist, William Ezell. Songs most associated with them are "Barrelhouse Man", "Sawmill Blues" and the Ezell-penned number, "Arkansas Mill Blues", which related the grim reality of lumber camp work and conditions. Robinson chiefly recorded for Paramount Records but also cut several sides for Broadway Records using the alias Bernice Drake. On two of her recordings, the pianist Bob Call or the guitarist Johnny St. Cyr replaced Ezell, and on two occasions in 1926, B. T. Wingfield or Shirley Clay played the cornet, with either Tiny Parham or Richard M. Jones on the piano. In 1928, she was backed by the clarinetist Johnny Dodds, the guitarist Blind Blake and either the pianist Jimmy Blythe or Jimmy Bertrand on xylophone.

To add to the variation, two of her sides ("Galveston Blues" and "2:16 Blues") were released under the name of Blanche Johnson, another pseudonym.

Little is known of her life after her recording career ended. She is thought to have married Perry Henderson in Flint, Michigan, in 1928, and to have died there in 1975.

In 1994, Document Records issued two anthologies incorporating all of her known recorded work.

In 2025 the Killer Blues Headstone Project placed the headstone for Elzadie Robinson at Sunset Hills Cemetery in Flint, Michigan.

== Discography ==
78 rpm singles – Paramount Records

12417	"Barrel House Man"	October 1926
12417	"Saw Mill Blues"	October 1926
12420	"Houston Bound"	October 1926
12420	"Humming Blues"	October 1926
12469	"Baltimore Blues"	March 1927
12469	"Troubled With The Blues"	March 1927
12509	"Back Door Blues"	July 1927
12509	"Whiskey Blues"	July 1927
12544	"Tick Tock Blues"	October 1927
12544	"Hour Behind the Gun"	October 1927
12573	"Santa Claus Crave"	November 1927
12573	"St Louis Cyclone Blues"	November 1927
12627	"You Ain't the Last Man"	March 1928
12627	"Love Crazy Blues"	March 1928
12635	"Pay Day Daddy Blues"	April 1928
12635	"Elzadie Policy Blues"	April 1928
12573	"Santa Claus Crave"	November 1927
12573	"St Louis Cyclone Blues"	November 1927
12627	"You Ain't the Last Man"	March 1928
12627	"Love Crazy Blues"	March 1928
12635	"Pay Day Daddy Blues"	April 1928
12635	"Elzadie Policy Blues"	April 1928
12676	"Mad Blues"	June 1928
12676	"Pleading Misery Blues"	June 1928
12689	"Wicked Daddy"	July 1928
12689	"It's Too Late Now"	July 1928
12701	"Arkansas Mill Blues"	October 1928
12701	"Gold Mansion Blues"	October 1928
12724	"Going South Blues"	October 1928
12724	"Rowdy Man Blues"	October 1928
12745A	"Unsatisfied Blues"	October 1928
12745B	"Need My Lovin' – Need My Daddy"	October 1928
12768A	"Cheatin' Daddy"	March 1929
12768B	"This is Your Last Night With Me"	March 1929
12795	"My Pullman Porter Man"	March 1929
12795B	"I Ain't Got Nobody"	March 1929
12900A	"Driving Me South"	March 1929
12900B	"Past and Future Blues"	March 1929

78 rpm singles – Broadway Records

5006	As Bernice Drake	"Humming Blues"	September 1926
5006	As Bernice Drake	"Houston Bound"	October 1926
5037	As Bernice Drake	"Sawmill Blues"	October 1926
5037	As Bernice Drake	"Barrel House Man"	October 1926
5038	As Bernice Drake	"Whiskey Blues" (736)	July 1927
5038	As Bernice Drake	"Back Door Blues" (735)	July 1927

== See also ==
- List of classic female blues singers
