= Ethel Finnie =

American blues singer

- Born: Ethel V. Finnie; January 7, 1898; New Orleans, Louisiana, United States
- Died: May 1, 1981 (aged 83) New Orleans, Louisiana, United States
- Genre: Classic female blues
- Occupations: Singer
- Instruments: Vocals
- Years active: 1920s
- Labels: Edison, Ajax, Emerson

Ethel V. Finnie (January 7, 1898 – May 1, 1981) was an American classic female blues singer. Her most notable recording is "You're Gonna Wake Up Some Morning, but Your Papa Will Be Gone". Information about her life outside music is sketchy.

== Life ==
Finnie was born in New Orleans, Louisiana, the second child and only daughter of Noble Armond Finnie, a butler, and Mary "Mamie" Anderson Finnie, a housewife. She had an older brother, Noble Finnie, Jr.

Finnie was a graduate of New Orleans University (later incorporated into Dillard University) and was employed as a schoolteacher at the McDonogh School No. 6.

Finnie married the pianist and composer Porter Grainger on September 25, 1923, in Stamford, Connecticut, with whom she performed throughout the northeastern United States, appearing at various venues and performing on radio programs, as documented in the pages of the African-American press of the period. It seems that after the birth of their daughter, Portia Lee Grainger, Finnie curtailed her activities and remained in New Orleans, close to her family, residing at 4021 Dryades Street. Eventually Porter and Finnie divorced.

She subsequently married William Turner and went into business in New Orleans as a hairdresser and later as the owner of a beauty shop, restaurant and grocery. She was involved in the sorority Iota Phi Lambda, serving as its southwestern regional director during the 1950s. She also served as the treasurer of the Fourth Region of the National Council of Negro Women in the 1960s.

Finnie died in New Orleans on May 1, 1981, aged 83.

== Career ==
Finnie's short recording career was partly produced by Joe Davis. Some of her material was written by her first husband, Porter Grainger. She recorded eight songs in 1923 and 1924, including "You're Gonna Wake Up Some Morning, but Your Papa Will Be Gone". It was released by Edison as part of the Edison Diamond Discs series in 1924 and was also issued on Edison's Amberol cylinder.

She also recorded for Ajax and Emerson during this short time span. Another song she recorded, "Mistreatin' Daddy Blues", was initially not released, which may have prevented her gaining a wider audience. Other little-known blues singers, including Gladys Bryant, Dolly Ross, and Ada Brown, vied with Finnie for Grainger's material.

All her recorded work was eventually released by Document Records.

== Selected discography ==
Year	A-side (Songwriter)	B-side (Songwriter)	Accompaniment	Record label
1923	"I Don't Love Nobody (So I Don't Have No Blues)" (Clara Smith)	"Don't You Quit Me Daddy" (Porter Grainger)	Porter Grainger	Ajax Records
1924	"He Wasn't Born in Araby, but He's a Sheikin' Fool" (Andy Razaf / Edgar Dowell)	"Heart Breakin' Joe" (N/K)	Fletcher Henderson	Emerson Records
1924	"Don't Know and Don't Care Blues" (Porter Grainger)	"Hula Blues" (Porter Grainger)	Porter Grainger	Ajax Records
1924	"You're Gonna Wake Up Some Morning, but Your Papa Will Be Gone" (N/K)		Porter Grainger	Edison Records

== See also ==
- List of classic female blues singers
