= Daddy (slang) =

Slang term

Daddy is a slang term that refers to a sexually attractive man who is involved with a younger or shorter partner.

Beginning in the 1920s, the term was often heard in blues music and African-American Vernacular English.

== History ==
=== Predecessors ===
According to the Historical Dictionary of American Slang, the earliest use of "daddy" in a non-paternal context was in 1681, in reference to what sex workers called their procurers or older male customers. This term is also used across ethnic groups, with its origins becoming most recognized in the 1920s.

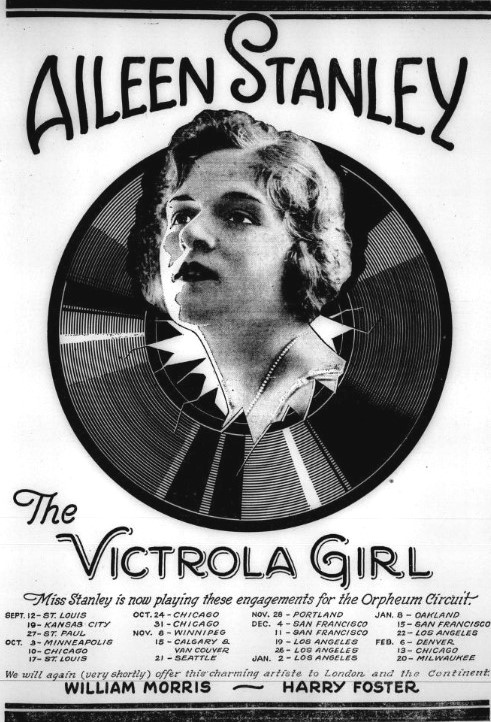
Aileen Stanley, who used the term in a romantic manner in her 1920 song "I Wonder Where My Sweet, Sweet Daddy's Gone."

Throughout the 1920s, the term was used in blues music and African-American Vernacular English to mean one's boyfriend, especially an older man or a sugar daddy. In 1920, the term is used in a romantic context in Aileen Stanley's blues song "I Wonder Where My Sweet, Sweet Daddy's Gone." Its usage is similar in Lavinia Turner's 1922 song "How Can I Be Your 'Sweet Mama' When You're 'Daddy' to Someone Else?" The same year, the term appears in Trixie Smith's "My Man Rocks Me" in the lyrics "My man rocks me, with one steady roll [...] I said now, Daddy, ain’t we got fun".

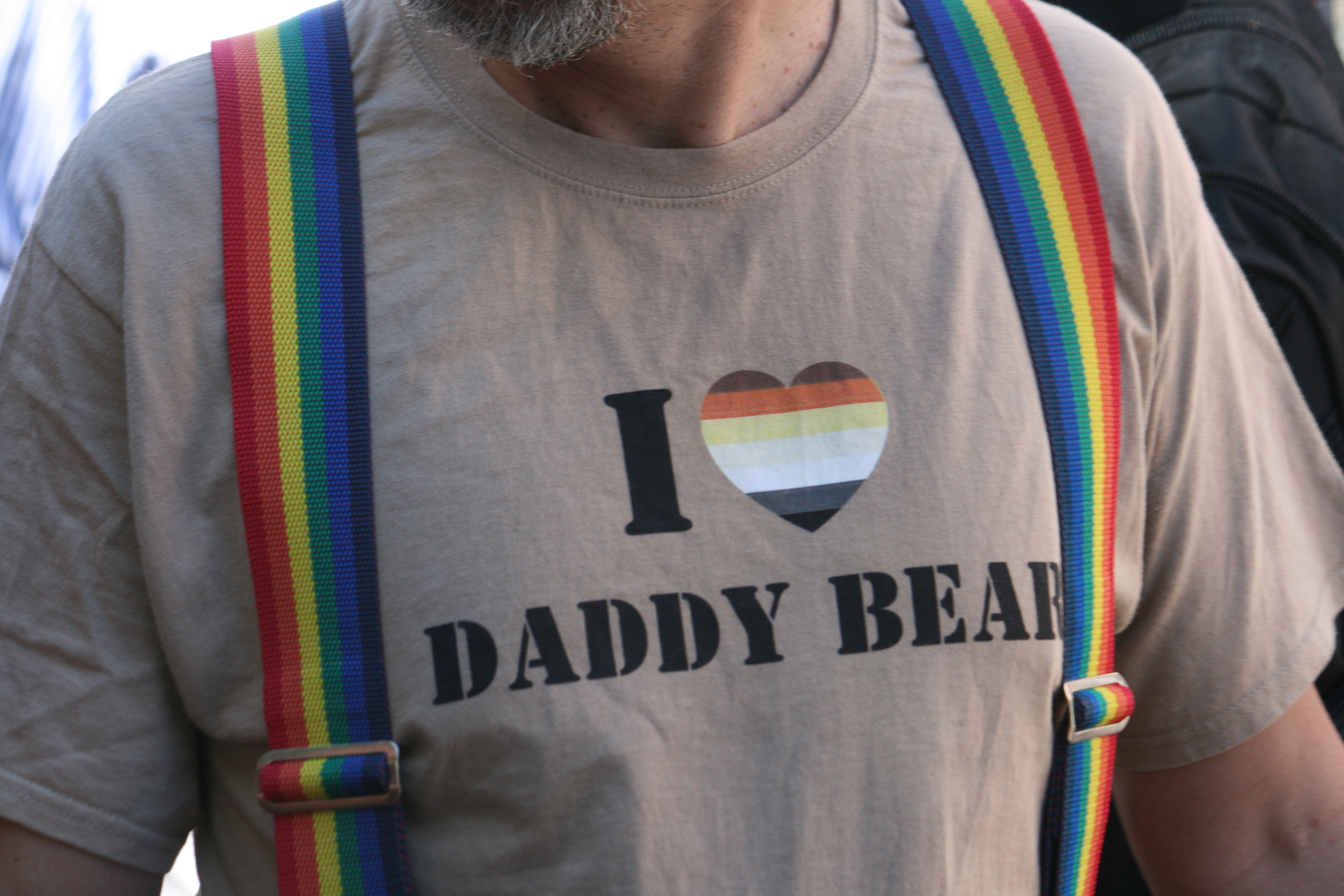
A shirt reading "I Love Daddy Bears", pictured at the Oslo pride parade, 2015

=== In gay culture ===
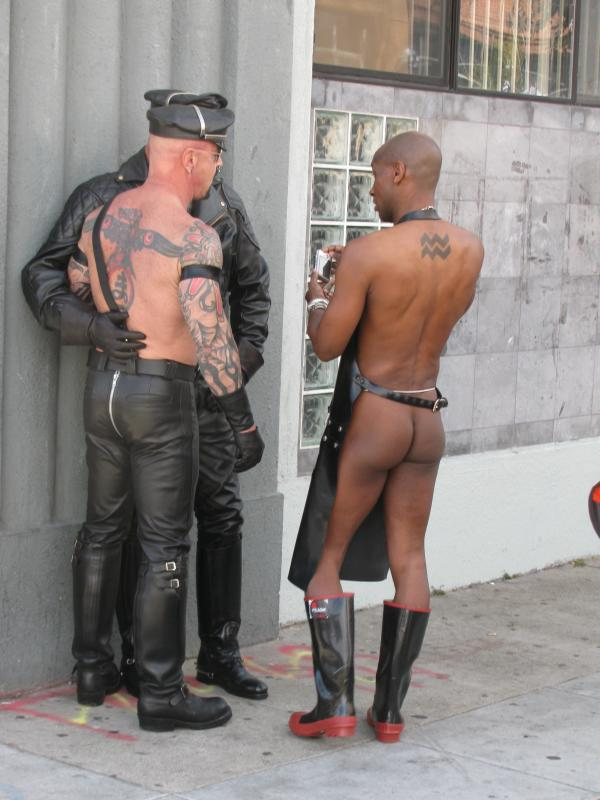
A group of “Leather Daddies”, pictured at the 2012 Folsom Street Fair.

In gay culture and BDSM, a "Dad/Son or “Man/Boy” relationship can share similarities with a dynamic of dominance and submission.

New York claimed in 2017 that the gay term evolved from leather subculture, which began in the 1940s.

In the 1970s, the "Leather Daddy" archetype (which has sadomasochistic associations) was proliferated in such media as the Drummer magazine (launched in 1975); 1976 to 1979 gay pornographic films Working Man Trilogy; and BDSM novels by Larry Townsend.

Braidon Schaufert has claimed that the term was further normalized through to Game Grumps' 2017 visual novel game, Dream Daddy: A Dad Dating Simulator, which centered "queer fathers in a romance game" and gained a significant online fandom.

== Gender ==
In 2000, Andrew Schopp claimed that the daddy archetype,

"Challenge[s] dominant ideologies of masculinity by appropriating the icons of masculinity and male authority, (IE. jocks, leather, motorcycles, uniforms) transporting them into the realm of gay male sexual experience."

In 2018, Braidon Schaufert claimed that,

“By creating the term 'daddy',’Queer communities have separated the specific Gender Performance of fatherhood from the actual act of raising children.’”.

In 2022, Transgender Studies Quarterly claimed that a Daddy/boy dynamic between trans people

"Can be read as gender labor; affective and intersubjective work that produces gender."

== See also ==
- Sugar dating, a transactional relationship, which may involve use of the term "sugar daddy" and “sugar baby.”
- T4T (Trans Men seeking Trans Men) relationships, a Daddy/boy dynamic can be part of the gender affirmation process, thereby leading to gender euphoria.
