= Ida May Mack =

American singer

- Also known as: Ida Mae Mack
- Born: Texas, United States
- Genres: Classic female blues, country blues, Texas blues
- Occupations: Singer, songwriter
- Instrument: Vocals
- Years active: 1928
- Label: Victor

Ida May Mack or Ida Mae Mack was an American classic female blues, country blues, and Texas blues singer and songwriter. She recorded eight songs in 1928, four of which she recorded twice. Six of these tracks were released at the time.

Little is known of her life outside the music industry.

== Biography ==
Little is known about Mack's origins and early life. It is known that she traveled by train to Memphis, Tennessee, in 1928, alongside Bessie Tucker and Charlie Kyle, with the intention of recording for Victor. Memphis was the location of the recording studio nearest to her home, which is generally agreed to have been in Texas.

The pianist K. D. Johnson, born in Dallas, Texas, accompanied both Mack and Tucker on their recordings, which took place on 29 and 30 August 1928. Johnson was remembered by another piano player, Whistlin' Alex Moore, as "49"; Mack referred to Johnson as "Mr. 49" during his piano solos, and she composed and recorded the song "Mr. Forty-Nine Blues." In calling Johnson "Mr. 49", she used a slang name often denoting tent show performers. In Mack's version of "Elm Street Blues", she used the street name as "a metaphor for unrequited love".

Mack made twelve recordings, of which six were issued at the time. She recorded alternate takes of four songs: "Wrong Doin' Daddy", "Elm Street Blues", "Mr. Forty-Nine Blues", and "Good-Bye Rider".

In 1960, the Dallas-based Whistlin' Alex Moore told an interviewer that Mack and Tucker were both "tough cookies ... don't mess with them". However, in a 1972 conversation, the pianist was unable to recall the name of either singer, which led the interviewer to suspect that he had drawn his own conclusions from their recordings.

All of Mack's tracks are available on various compilation albums. Nothing is known of her life after the recording session.

== Songs ==
All songs were written by Mack and recorded on August 29–30, 1928.

| Title | Record label |
|---|---|
| "Elm Street Blues" | Victor |
| "Good-Bye Rider" | Victor |
| "Mr. Forty-Nine Blues" | Victor |
| "Mr. Moore Blues" | Victor |
| "When You Lose Your Daddy" | Victor |
| "Wrong Doin' Daddy" | Victor |
| "Sunday Morning Blues" | Originally unissued |
| "Country Spaces" | Originally unissued |

== Selected compilation discography ==
- Bessie Tucker & Ida May Mack, 1928: The Texas Moaners (Magpie Records, UK, 1979)
- Bessie Tucker, Ida May Mack: Queens of Texas Blues (1928–1929). (Document, 1989)
- Ida May Mack & Bessie Tucker. Backgrounds of Jazz, vol. 2. ("X" Records, 1953)

== See also ==
- List of classic female blues singers
- List of country blues musicians
- List of Texas blues musicians
