= Edith North Johnson =

American blues singer, pianist and songwriter

- Also known as: Hattie North, Maybelle Allen
- Born: Edith North; January 2, 1903; St. Louis, Missouri, United States
- Died: February 28, 1988 (aged 85) St. Louis, Missouri
- Genres: Classic female blues
- Occupations: Singer, pianist, songwriter
- Instruments: Vocals, piano
- Years active: 1920s–1960s
- Labels: QRS, Paramount, Folkways

Edith North Johnson (January 2, 1903 – February 28, 1988) was an American classic female blues singer, pianist and songwriter. Her most noted tracks are "Honey Dripper Blues", "Can't Make Another Day" and "Eight Hour Woman". She wrote another of her songs, "Nickel's Worth of Liver Blues".

== Biography ==
She was born Edith North in 1903. She married Jesse Johnson, a St. Louis record producer. She originally worked at her husband's Deluxe Music Store as a saleswoman. Although not a professional singer, Johnson recorded eighteen sides in 1928 and 1929. She started on QRS Records in 1928. She then switched to Paramount, recording at a session in Grafton, Wisconsin, attended by Charley Patton. It is reckoned that Patton did not play on any of her recordings.

Using pseudonyms such as Hattie North (on Vocalion) and Maybelle Allen, Johnson also recorded other tracks for small labels. Under the name Hattie North, she recorded "Lovin' That Man Blues" with Count Basie.

During World War II, Johnson managed a taxicab operation in St. Louis. She ran Johnson's Deluxe Cafė, after her husband's death in 1946. Samuel Charters located her in 1961 and recorded her, accompanied by Henry Brown, for the anthology album The Blues in St. Louis, released by Folkways Records.

Her recording of "Honey Dripper Blues" was the inspiration for the nickname used by Roosevelt Sykes.

In her later life, Johnson spent time undertaking social work in her hometown. She died in St. Louis in February 1988, at the age of 85.

Four of her recordings are included in the boxed set Screamin' and Hollerin' the Blues: The Worlds of Charley Patton (2001).

== See also ==
- List of classic female blues singers
