= Lillian Glinn =

American singer (1902–1978)

- Born: May 10, 1902; Hillsboro, Texas, U.S.
- Died: July 22, 1978 (aged 76) Richmond, California, U.S.
- Genres: Classic female blues; country blues; gospel blues
- Occupations: Singer; songwriter
- Instrument: Vocals
- Years active: 1920s only
- Label: Columbia

Lillian Glinn (May 10, 1902 – July 22, 1978) was an American classic female blues and country blues singer and songwriter. She spent most of her career in black vaudeville. Among her popular recordings were "Black Man Blues," "Doggin' Me Blues" and "Atlanta Blues." The blues historian Paul Oliver commented that there were a number of female blues singers who "deserve far greater recognition than they have had", and one of those he cited was Glinn.

== Biography ==
Glinn was born in Hillsboro, Texas, and later moved to Dallas.

She was first noticed singing spirituals in church by Hattie Burleson, who also went on to become a performer. Under Burleson's guidance, Glinn became successful in vaudeville and by 1927 was signed to a recording contract with Columbia. Glinn took part in six recording sessions, in New Orleans, Atlanta and Dallas, from 1927 to 1929. She recorded a total of 22 tracks. Her specialty was slow blues ballads using her rich and heavy contralto voice. Her songs concentrated on the harsher side of life and sometimes included sexual innuendo. Her recordings, including her April 1928 recording of "Shake It Down", gained her national recognition.

The musicologist David Evans noted that "it is quite likely that many of Lillian Glinn's blues without any listed composer were her own material. If so, she would be the exception among Columbia's female blues singers".

Following this period of activity, Glinn retreated to a church-based life and moved to California, where she married the Rev. O. P. Smith.

Her entire recorded work was released in 1994 by Document Records.

She was interviewed and photographed by Paul Oliver in 1971.

== Compilation discography ==
Year	Title	Record label
1987	Lillian Glinn & Mae Glover	Story of the Blues
1994	Complete Recorded Works (1927 1929)	Document

== See also ==
- List of classic female blues singers
