= Daisy Martin =

American blues singer

Martin's 1921 recording of the song, "Keep on Going"

Martin's 1921 recording of the song, "Nightmare Blues"

Daisy Martin (fl. c. 1914 – c. 1925) was an American blues singer in the classic female blues style.

She toured the eastern and midwestern United States in black vaudeville in the 1910s and early 1920s. In 1914 she appeared in the revue My Friend from Kentucky at the National Theater in Chicago, Illinois. In 1917 she performed in the musical comedy My People, which also featured Sam Gray and Julia Moody. In 1920 she appeared at the Strand Theatre in Chicago in the revue Hello 1919.

Martin was one of the first black women to sing blues on recordings when she recorded for the Gennett and Okeh labels in April 1921. On her first sides, "Royal Garden Blues" and "Spread Yo' Stuff", she was accompanied by the Five Jazz Bell Hops, whose identities are unknown. Her final session was in July 1923. In total she recorded 16 sides.

On January 20, 1922, she competed in a blues-singing contest with Lucille Hegamin, Alice Leslie Carter and Trixie Smith (the eventual winner) at the Manhattan Casino in New York City. For this contest, which was a highlight of the Fifteenth Infantry's First Band Concert and Dance, Noble Sissle was master of ceremonies, and Fiorello la Guardia served as one of the judges.

Blues writer Steve Tracy wrote in 1997 that "Martin is really not one of the better vaudeville blues singers, possessed as she is of a soprano voice with a very stilted vibrato effect". Few of the players who accompanied her on record have been identified, but the band at one of her sessions included Gus Aiken, Jake Frazier, and Garvin Bushell.

Martin's complete recordings were reissued in CD format by Document Records in 1997 on Daisy Martin & Ozie McPherson: Complete Recorded Works 1921–1926 In Chronological Order (DODC-5522).
