= Ora Alexander =

American classic female blues singer

- Born: c. 1896
- Origin: United States
- Genres: Classic female blues
- Occupation: Singer
- Instruments: Vocals, accordion
- Years active: 1931–1932
- Label: Columbia

Ora Alexander (born c. 1896) was an American classic female blues singer. She was a recording artist in the early 1930s, releasing eight sides, including the dirty blues tracks "You've Got to Save That Thing" and "I Crave Your Lovin' Every Day". Her recordings were in a primitive barrelhouse style. Little is known of her life outside of music.

== Career ==
According to researchers Bob Eagle and Eric LeBlanc, Alexander was born around 1896. She made ten recordings in New York City for Columbia Records, between May 1931 and March 1932, eight of which were released. From the dates of the recordings it is known that she was in New York at least twice within one year, but it is not certain whether she ever resided there. Her pianist was not generally named on the recordings, but it is certain that Milton Davage was her accompanist on "I'm Wild About My Patootie". It is conjectured that Alexander accompanied herself on other tracks.

Her saucy, ribald style is exemplified in her song "I Crave Your Lovin' Every Day" (1932), with the lyrics "Come on daddy, get down on your knees, Sock it to my weak spot if you please". Her earlier, similarly dirty blues number, "You've Got to Save That Thing" (1931), included "If you want to satisfy my soul, Come on and rock me with a steady roll".

== Discography ==
=== Recordings ===
Track	Record label
"I Crave Your Lovin' Every Day"	Columbia
"I'm Going to Have It Now"	Columbia
"I'm Wild About My Patootie"	Columbia
"Men Sure Are Deceiving"	Columbia
"Rider Needs a Fast Horse"	Columbia
"Sweetest Daddy in Town"	Columbia
"Ugly Man Blues"	Columbia
"You've Got to Save That Thing"	Columbia

=== Compilation album ===
Year	Title	Record label
1997	Female Blues Singers, vol. 1, A/B (1924–1932)	Document Records

== See also ==
- List of classic female blues singers
