= Hazel Meyers =

American singer

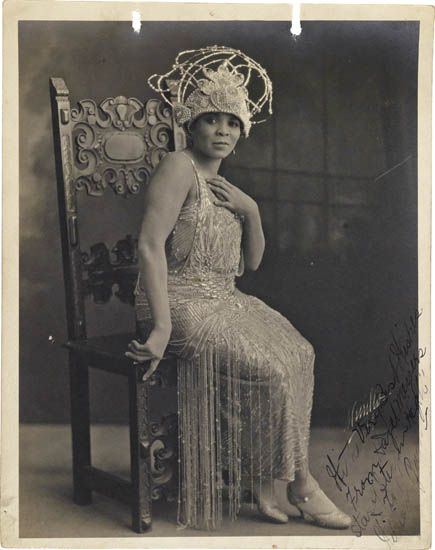

Background information
- Born: Unknown
- Died: Unknown
- Genres: Classic female blues, country blues
- Occupation: Singer
- Instrument: Vocals
- Years active: 1920s–1930s
- Labels: Ajax, Brunswick, Okeh, various

Hazel Meyers was an American classic female blues and country blues singer. She spent most of her career in black vaudeville and on recordings she was billed as a blues artist. Her more famous numbers included "Heartbreaking Blues" and "Blackville After Dark", both sung in her contralto voice.

== Biography ==
Meyers recorded a total of forty-one sides, most of them between September 1923 and August 1924, released by several record labels, including Ajax, Brunswick (on the Vocalion label) Pathė, Banner, Bell, Emerson, and (for her final couple of releases, in June 1926) Okeh. She had releases on six different labels in 1924. Her accompanists variously included Fletcher Henderson, Porter Grainger, James "Bubber" Miley, Leslie "Hutch" Henderson, Don Redman, and (on one recording) Fats Waller. She was the first female vaudeville artist to record the satirical song "Black Star Line", released in May 1924. The song was recorded by both Meyers and Rosa Henderson within a twenty-four-hour period. There has been speculation that Meyers also recorded under the pseudonyms Mae Harris for Domino and Louella Smith for Oriole.

Meyers performed in vaudeville in the 1920s. She performed in Steppin' High, a variety show staged in Harlem, New York City, backed by the orchestra of Fletcher Henderson. It is believed that she regularly appeared in theatrical productions until the early 1930s.

Little is known of her life outside her professional engagements.

Meyers's entire recorded work was issued by Document Records in 1996.

== Compilation discography ==
Year	Title	Record label
1996	Complete Recorded Works in Chronological Order, vol. 1 (1923–1924)	Document
1996	Edna Hicks, Hazel Meyers, Laura Smith, Complete Recorded Works in Chronological Order, vol. 2 (1923–1927)	Document

== See also ==
- List of classic female blues singers
