= Ida Goodson =

American singer

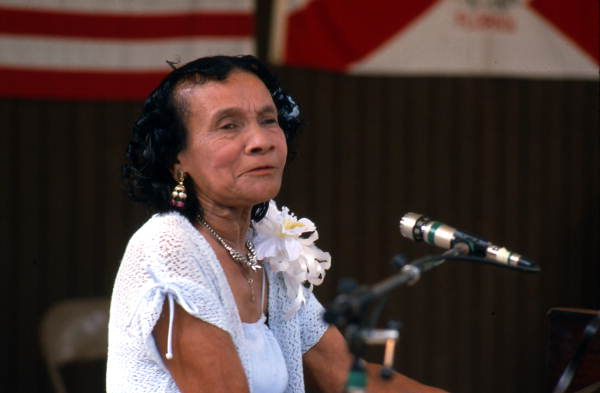

Background information
- Born: November 23, 1909; Pensacola, Florida, United States
- Died: January 5, 2000 (aged 90) Pensacola, Florida, United States
- Genres: Classic female blues, jazz
- Occupations: Singer, pianist
- Instruments: Vocals, piano
- Years active: 1920s–2000

Ida Goodson (November 23, 1909 – January 5, 2000) was an American classic female blues and jazz singer and pianist.

== Biography ==
Goodson was born in Pensacola, Florida, the youngest of seven sisters, six of whom survived to adulthood. Her father and mother both played the piano. Her father was a deacon at Mount Olive Baptist Church in Pensacola.

All of the daughters in her family received musical training, with the sole intention that they would perform in church. Goodson noted that the blues were banned in her house. However, Ida and her sisters Mabel, Della, Sadie, Edna, and Wilhelmina (better known as Billie Pierce) all subsequently had careers in blues or jazz. The Preservation Hall Jazz Band often had one of the Goodson sisters playing keyboards. Ida played the piano accompanying silent films and at dances.

The Florida Folk Archive released a recording made at the Florida Folk Festival in 1980, containing a duet between Ida and Sadie. Ida received a Florida Folk Heritage Award in 1987.

A 2002 stage show, The Goodson Sisters: Pensacola's Greatest Gift to Jazz, focused on Ida, Wilhelmina, and Sadie. The PBS video Wild Women Don't Have the Blues includes rare footage of Bessie Smith and Ida, her one-time accompanist. The music journalist Chris Heim wrote in the Chicago Tribune that "sprightly blues and gospel performer Ida Goodson—the scene stealer of the film—gives a stunning exhibition of the intimate connection between gospel and blues when she takes the song "Precious Lord" from a rich, slow gospel opening to a rollicking boogie-woogie conclusion."

In her senior years, Goodson played the organ at several churches in Pensacola. The album Ida Goodson: Pensacola Piano—Florida Gulf Blues, Jazz, and Gospel was released by the Florida Folklife Program.

== See also ==
- List of classic female blues singers
