= Wesley Wallace =

- Genres: Blues, boogie-woogie
- Occupation: Pianist
- Instruments: Piano, spoken vocals
- Years active: 1929–1930
- Label: Paramount Records

Wesley Wallace was an American blues and boogie-woogie pianist who accompanied a couple of St. Louis-based singers on recording sessions in 1929, and recorded two tracks of his own the following year, which were original. All of his recordings utilized the I and IV chords of the usual blues progression, completely omitting the V chord. One of Wallace's tracks, "was one of the finest train/railroad tunes".

== Career ==
Details of Wallace's life are sketchy and partly guesswork on the part of blues historians. It is thought that he may have originally hailed from Arkansas and, around the time of his short recording career, that he lived in Alton, Illinois, approximately 18 miles north of St. Louis. However, there are no definitive birth nor death details available from any reliable authority. Equally, no information exists of Wallace's life prior to his involvement in his first recording session. In October 1929, Wallace provided piano accompaniment to Bessie Mae Smith (not to be confused with Bessie Smith) on two sides, "Farewell Baby Blues" and "St. Louis Daddy", which were released by Paramount Records. The two cuts were also issued on Broadway Records, attributed to Sara Carter with Willis Waldon. The tracks were recorded in Grafton, Wisconsin.

In November that year, Wallace recorded again in Grafton, two sides of his own; "No. 29" and "Fanny Lee Blues", also released by Paramount. AllMusic noted that "his two recordings speak volumes of a prodigious talent." In around November 1929 in the same Grafton-based studio, Wallace probably supplied piano backing to Robert Peeples on a couple of tracks; "Dying Baby Blues" and "Mama's Boy", also issued on Paramount. All of his recordings utilized the I and IV chords of the usual blues progression, completely omitting the V chord. It made Wallace's piano playing unusual, if not quite unique, but as an accompanist this structural and harmonic peculiarity caused Peeples difficulty, as in "Dying Baby Blues", when the expected V chord did not occur.

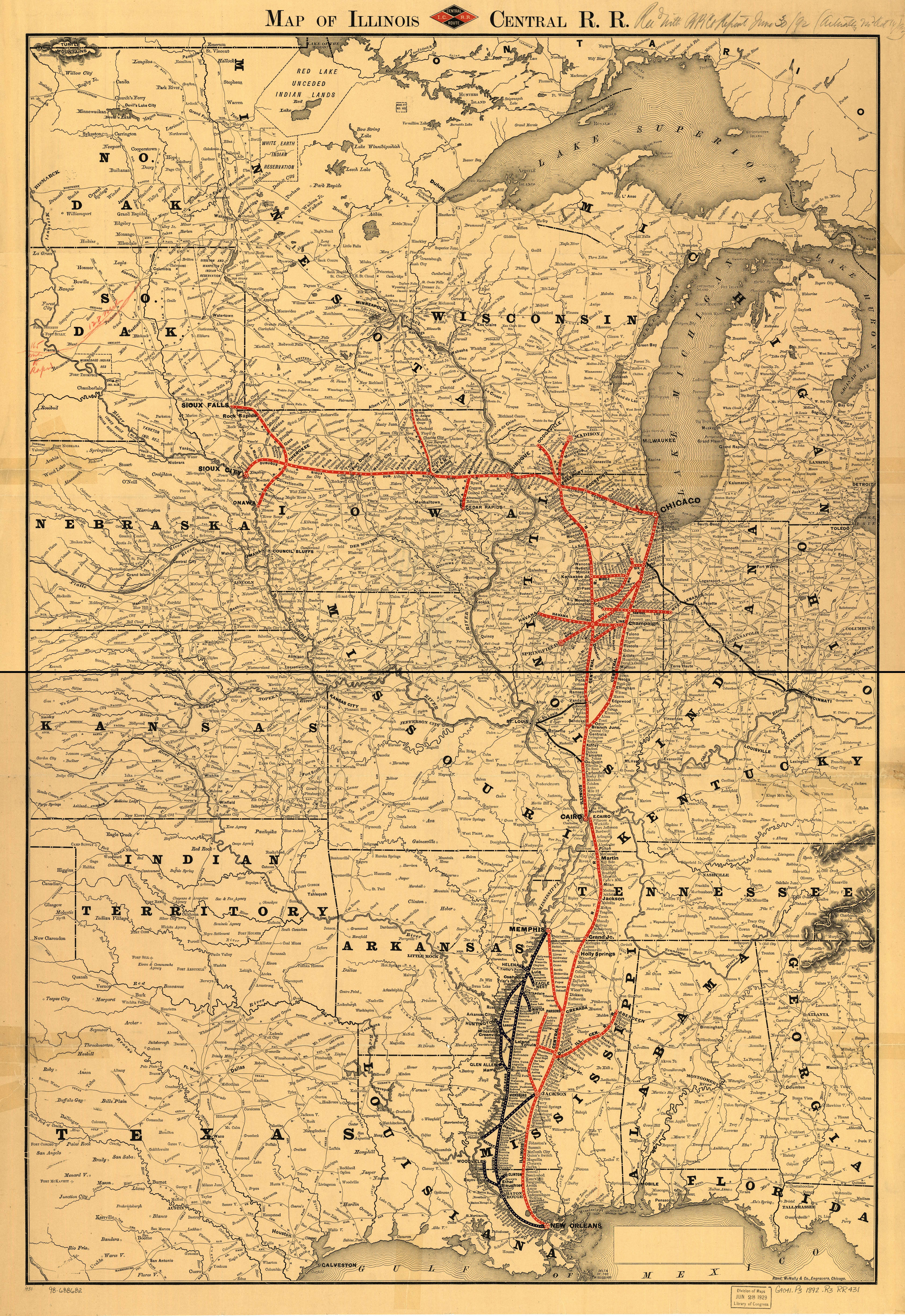
Illinois Central 1892 Route Map

=== "No. 29" ===
The "No. 29" in question was a steam locomotive pulling boxcars from Cairo, Illinois, to East St. Louis on the Illinois Central Railroad.

"No. 29" utilized an unusual 3/4 meter with a restless, running eighth-note chromatic figure, to depict the train's motion. Wallace's spoken comments over the top of his playing included his imitation of a train whistle blowing and the engine 'running hot'. Wallace played an abnormally consistent unaccentuated bass line in 6/4 time, with his right hand interspersed by speech and noise effects in recreating the sounds of a train journey. The song contains vivid descriptions of "riding the blinds", a dangerous practice where a hobo would hide between the cars of a moving train.

One music journalist noted that "No. 29" "was one of the finest train/railroad tunes".

=== "Fanny Lee Blues" ===
"Fanny Lee Blues" was a well received instrumental track. Wallace's phrasing is not predictable, for example "Fanny Lee Blues" ranges from six to eleven bars per chorus, sometimes including half bars. The rhythm also changes between swing and straight at various places, with the amount of swing changing sometimes from one bar to the next one.

Henry Townsend stated "Wesley Wallace had beautiful coordination with what he was doing, very timely. The introduction he plays to "Fanny Lee Blues" was a typical sound of this city, that beat." In that, Townsend was referring specifically to St. Louis. In 1977, Magpie Records issued a sixteen track compilation, The Piano Blues Volume One : Paramount 1929-1930, which had both of Wallace's solo tracks. The album's liner notes stated that Wallace was a "highly individual and eccentric pianist" and that "Fanny Lee Blues" was "common to the St. Louis style" and "played with disregard to bar lengths".

== Perceived connection to Sylvester Palmer ==
In November 1929, Sylvester Palmer, another St. Louis boogie-woogie pianist, waxed four sides in Chicago, Illinois for the rival Columbia Records. This led to later speculation that Wallace and Palmer were the same person. Palmer similarly used only I and IV chords, and at times the right-hand figuration showed common ground. There are similarities between Palmer's "Broke Man Blues" and Wallace's "Fanny Lee Blues".

However, Henry Townsend knew Palmer very well, and was acquainted with Wallace. Townsend traveled to Chicago with Palmer and when questioned stated "I've heard it said that the piano players Wesley Wallace and Sylvester Palmer were one and the same person. Forget it – it's not true. At Sylvester's session I was sitting right in the studio with him, and at my session he was right in the studio with me, and there was no other person involved." In Townsend's book, A Blues Life, he stated he knew both men and was able to cite differences in their playing.

== Later releases ==
In May 1933, Jabo Williams recorded "Jab Blues", and this track was issued alongside Wallace's "No. 29" on a 10-inch 78 rpm "limited edition, released for the subscribers of Jazz Information".

The most comprehensive gathering of his output occurred in 1994, when Document Records released St. Louis Barrelhouse Piano - 1929-34 : The Complete Recorded Works of Wesley Wallace, Henry Brown & Associates on compact disc. The collection included all six tracks from Smith, Peeples and Wallace, plus Sylvester Palmer's four sides. Both of Wallace's solo tracks were issued as part of the quadruple CD compilation album, The Paramount Masters (JSP Records, 2004).

== Discography ==
Year	Title	Record label
1930	"No. 29" / "Fanny Lee Blues"	Paramount Records

== Bibliography ==
- Bölke, Peter (2012). Deep South : The Story of the Blues. Hamburg: Ear Books. ISBN 9783940004987. (includes four compact discs of audio recordings)
