= Winter Blues =

The winter blues is another name for seasonal affective disorder

Winter Blues may refer to:

- Winter Blues, book by Norman E. Rosenthal
- "Winter Blues", 1927 song by Madlyn Davis
- "Winter Blues", B-side of "Christmas (Baby Please Come Home)" (1965)
- Winter Blues, album by Edgar Winter
