= Ruby Smith =

American singer

- Born: Ruby Walker; August 24, 1903; New York City, United States
- Died: March 24, 1977 (aged 73) Anaheim, California, United States
- Genres: Classic female blues
- Occupations: Singer, songwriter
- Instrument: Vocals
- Years active: 1938–1947
- Labels: Bluebird, various

Ruby Smith (August 24, 1903 – March 24, 1977) was an American classic female blues singer. She was a niece, by marriage, of the better-known Bessie Smith, who discouraged Ruby from pursuing a recording career. Nevertheless, following Bessie's death in 1937, Ruby recorded twenty-one sides between 1938 and 1947. She is also known for her candid observations on her own and Bessie's lifestyle.

== Biography ==
She was born Ruby Walker in New York City.

She met Bessie Smith, her aunt (by marriage), in Philadelphia. After Bessie's debut recording, in February 1923, Ruby joined her on tour in 1924. Ruby assisted off-stage with costume changes and provided entertainment during intermissions by dancing. Ruby's thoughts of a career as a singer were initially thwarted in 1926 at Bessie's insistence, but they continued traveling together on tour. In Atlanta, Georgia, Ruby spent a night in jail after being caught bringing moonshine for her aunt to consume. In 1927, Ruby was part of the female entourage led by Bessie to the "buffet flats" in Detroit, Michigan. A lengthy recorded interview she gave to Chris Albertson contained references to this time and others, and the recording became part of Bessie Smith's The Complete Recordings, Vol. 5: The Final Chapter box set. Of a particularly "open house" sex show, Smith said, "People used to pay good just to go in there and see him do his act."

Later Jack Gee, who was married to Bessie at the time, once implored Ruby to take the musical stage after her aunt had walked out in Indianapolis, Indiana. However, the deception did not last long, and in the event Bessie died in 1937. Shortly afterwards, Ruby adopted the stage name Ruby Smith, and less than a year later she recorded six tracks, including a cover version of Bessie's "Send Me to the 'Lectric Chair Blues". At the same session she recorded her version of "Draggin' My Heart Around", by Alex Hill.

In March 1939, Smith recorded, under the musical direction of James P. Johnson, "He's Mine, All Mine" and "Backwater Blues" (the latter written by Bessie Smith and Johnson). In December 1941, backed by an ensemble led by Sammy Price, she recorded two more tracks, "Why Don't You Love Me Anymore?" and her own song "Harlem Gin Blues". Her final recording sessions took place in August 1946 and January 1947, when she was backed by Gene Sedric's band.

Smith died on March 24, 1977, in Anaheim, California, at the age of 73.

Her recorded work has been issued on several compilation albums, including Jazzin' the Blues (1943–1952), released by Document Records in 2000.

== Recordings ==
Recording date	Track	Songwriter	Musical direction	Record label
May 18, 1938	"Dream Man Blues"			Bluebird
May 18, 1938	"Selfish Blues"			Bluebird
May 18, 1938	"Hard Up Blues"	Joe Davis / Spencer Williams	Blind John Davis	Bluebird
May 18, 1938	"'Lectric Chair Blues"	Joe Davis / Spencer Williams	Blind John Davis	Bluebird
May 18, 1938	"Flyin' Mosquito Blues"			Bluebird
May 18, 1938	"Draggin' My Heart Around"	Alex Hill		Bluebird
March 9, 1939	"Backwater Blues"	Bessie Smith / James P. Johnson	James P. Johnson	
March 9, 1939	"He's Mine All Mine"	Porter Grainger	James P. Johnson	
October 15, 1941	"Make Me Love You"	Porter Grainger		
October 15, 1941	"Fruit Cakin' Mama"	Porter Grainger	Sammy Price	Decca
October 15, 1941	"Black Gal"	Porter Grainger	Sammy Price	Decca
October 15, 1941	"Thinkin' Blues"	Bessie Smith		
December 10, 1941	"Why Don't You Love Me Anymore?"	Walmsley	Sammy Price	Decca
December 10, 1941	"Harlem Gin Blues"	Ruby Smith	Sammy Price	Decca
August 1946	"Chicago Woman Blues" (Part 1)	Neil Lawrence	Gene Sedric	Harmonia
August 1946	"Chicago Woman Blues" (Part 2)	Neil Lawrence	Gene Sedric	Harmonia
August 1946	"Baby, Baby, Baby Blues"	Neil Lawrence	Gene Sedric	
August 1946	"Sedric's Blues"	Neil Lawrence / Gene Sedric	Gene Sedric	
January 8, 1947	"You Satisfy"	Les Baxter	Gene Sedric	RCA Victor
January 8, 1947	"Port Wine Blues"	Bill Samuels	Gene Sedric	RCA Victor
January 8, 1947	"Hot Sauce Susie"	Alphonse Demboe	Gene Sedric	RCA Victor
January 8, 1947	"I'm Scared of That Woman"		Gene Sedric	RCA Victor

== See also ==
- List of classic female blues singers
