= Virginia Crawford =

Virginia Crawford may refer to:

- Virginia Crawford, vaudeville performer in the United States who became Virginia Liston after marrying fellow performer Dave Liston
- Ginnie Crawford (born Virginia Powell, 1983), American athlete
- Virginia Mary Crawford (1862–1948), British Catholic suffragist and writer
