= Mozelle Alderson =

American classic female blues singer

- Also known as: Possibly Kansas City Kitty, Hannah May, Thelma Holmes, Mae Belle Lee, Jane Lucas
- Born: Mozelle Fagans; November 20, 1904; Bedford, Ohio, United States
- Died: February 15, 1994 (aged 89) Chicago, Illinois, United States
- Genres: Classic female blues
- Occupation: Singer
- Instrument: Vocals
- Years active: 1920s–1930s
- Labels: Black Patti, Brunswick, ARC, Vocalion, Paramount

Mozelle Alderson (November 20, 1904 – February 15, 1994) was an American classic female blues singer. She recorded a small number of tracks for Black Patti Records in 1927 and for Brunswick Records In 1930. Her most regular pianist was Judson Brown. She was a one-time vocalist for the Famous Hokum Boys in 1930 and toured and recorded as a backing vocalist for other blues artists. Alderson used a number of aliases, possibly including Kansas City Kitty, Hannah May, Thelma Holmes, Mae Belle Lee, and Jane Lucas.

Little is known of her life outside of her recording career.

== Career ==
She was born Mozelle Fagans in Bedford, Ohio, in 1904. She married and moved to Chicago, Illinois. a period of time when many classic female blues singers relocated to northern cities. Her early musical background aligned with the emerging classic female blues tradition that developed in urban centers during this time.

Alderson recorded three singles released by Black Patti Records in 1927, on which she was accompanied on the six tracks by the pianist Blind James Beck: "Mobile Central Blues", "Tall Man Blues", "Mozelle Blues", "State Street Special", "Sobbin' the Blues" and "Room Rent Blues". She recorded "Tight Whoopee" backed with "Tight in Chicago", released by Brunswick Records in 1930. The pianist Judson Brown accompanied her on the Brunswick recordings. She also recorded for the ARC and Vocalion labels.

During the rise of hokum music in Chicago between 1928 and 1932, Thomas A. Dorsey and his collaborators recorded a large number of commercially successful hokum songs. Their hit “It’s Tight Like That” helped define the style, combining piano and guitar with playful, suggestive lyrics. Dorsey recorded extensively during this period with musicians such as Big Bill Broonzy, Whittaker, and Mozelle Alderson, contributing to more than sixty hokum recordings produced under the supervision of Vocalion producer Lester Melrose.

Several discographers have suggested that Alderson may have recorded under additional names, including Kansas City Kitty, Hannah May, Mae Belle Lee, and Thelma Holmes. These attributions remain debated among blues historians, reflecting the common practice of assigning multiple pseudonyms to artists during the era for contractual or marketing reasons.

Harum Scarums, a trio comprising Big Bill Broonzy, Georgia Tom and Alderson, recorded the two-part "Alabama Scratch" in Grafton, Wisconsin, for Paramount Records (Paramount 13054) in January 1931, and it was reported that it sounded "as if it was a real party."

The self-titled compilation album of the Famous Hokum Boys, issued in 2015 by JSP Records, includes the following in its credits: Mozelle Alderson, Scrapper Blackwell, Big Bill Broonzy, Georgia Tom, Frank Brasswell, Kansas City Kitty, Hannah May, and Arthur Petties.

Alderson was widowed by 1941. She married John Slocum in Chicago in 1943.

She died in Chicago in 1994, aged 89.

Her recordings are available on several compilation albums.

== See also ==
- List of classic female blues singers
