= Eliza Brown =

Blues singer and recording artist

Eliza Brown (1903 – 1983) was an American classic female blues singer and recording artist, who also went by the alias Ozie McPherson and after marriage as Ozie Ware. She was active in the late 1920s, when she recorded several tracks for Columbia Records including "Get On Out of Here" and "Stop Laying That Stuff On Me". Little is known about her outside of her recordings. She married the entertainer Sonnie Ware.

== Career ==
Brown made eight recordings for Columbia Records in New York City in September and October 1929. Many of her recordings were duets with Ann Johnson, for two of which, "Get On Out of Here" and "Let’s Get it Straight", the Columbia files originally credited Coot and McPherson but the names have been crossed out. "Get On Out of Here" is a mostly spoken word song except for a sung chorus, the lyrics to which are "Now take it on outa here, take it on outa here". The content of the song concerns a humorous fight between two women, played by Brown and Johnson. In November 1928, as Ozie Ware, she recorded a number of songs with Duke Ellington and his orchestra.

== Recordings ==
=== As Eliza Brown ===
for Columbia, New York City

Recorded Thursday, 19 September 1929

- "Get On Out Of Here" [duet with Ann Johnson]
- "Let’s Get it Straight" [duet with Ann Johnson]

Recorded Monday, 7 October 1929

- "Stop Laying That Stuff On Me"
- "Take A Little Bit"
- "Peddlin’ Man"
- "If Papa Has Outside Lovin'"

Recorded Wednesday 16 October 1929

- "I Knows You" [duet with Ann Johnson, unissued]
- "Don't Take 'Em Fo' Yo' Friend" [duet with Ann Johnson, unissued]

=== As Ozie McPherson ===
for Paramount Records, Chicago

Recorded c. November 1925

- "You Gotta Know How"
- "Outside of That He's All Right With Me"

Recorded c. January 1926

- "Standing On The Corner Blues"
- "He's My Man"

Recorded c. February 1926

- "Down To The Bottom Where I Stay"
- "I Want My Loving"
- "Nobody Rolls Their Jelly Roll Like Mine"
- "I'm So Blue Since My Sweetie Went Away"

=== As Ozie Ware ===
for Victor Records, New York

Recorded October 30, 1928

- "Santa Claus, Bring My Man Back To Me"
- "I Done Caught You Blues"
- "No Papa No" [with Duke Ellington and His Cotton Club Orchestra]

Recorded November 15, 1928

- "Bandanna Babies" [with Duke Ellington and His Cotton Club Orchestra]
- "Diga Diga Doo" [with Duke Ellington and His Cotton Club Orchestra]

for Cameo Records

Recorded January 1929

- "Hit Me In The Nose Blues" [with the Whoopee Makers]
- "It's All Comin' Home To You" [piano acc. Duke Ellington]

Recorded March 1929

- "He Just Don't Appeal To Me" [with the Whoopee Makers]
