= Cleo Gibson =

American singer

Cleo Gibson was an American classic female blues singer active in the 1920s. Her full name was Cleosephus Gibson. She recorded two tracks for Okeh Records, "I’ve Got Ford Movements In My Hips" and "Nothing But Blues". Much surrounding her life is a mystery, but her recordings are a notable example of American blues music.

== Career ==
Gibson was originally one of a pair of vaudeville performers known as Gibson and Gibson. She reportedly had a great vocal resemblance to another blues singer, Bessie Smith, which may have been part of the reason she was given a recording date.

Gibson recorded two tracks for Okeh Records in Atlanta in March 1929, "I’ve Got Ford Movements In My Hips" and "Nothing But Blues". The first is significant as an early example of using a car as a metaphor for a woman. The lyrics are sexual in nature, comparing the movement of an engine to the movements of sexual intercourse with lyrics that include "I got Ford engine movement in my hips, 10,000 miles guaranteed" and "A Ford is a car everybody wants to ride, jump in, you will see."

== Recordings ==
Recorded in Atlanta, Georgia by a field unit for Okeh Records

Thursday, March 14, 1929

- “I’ve Got Ford Movements In My Hips”
- “Nothing But Blues”

Trumpet: Henry Mason, Piano: J. Neal Montgomery, Guitar: unknown, probably John Smith
