= Johnny Parth =

Austrian record producer (1930–2025)

- Born: Johann Ferdinand Parth; 11 January 1930; Ottakring, Vienna, Austria
- Died: 8 May 2025 (aged 95); Vienna, Austria
- Occupations: Record producer, artist, musician
- Years active: 1950s–2000
- Known for: Document Records

Johann Ferdinand "Johnny" Parth (11 January 1930 – 8 May 2025) was an Austrian record producer, club owner, musician and artist, who founded Document Records, the leading record label in the reissue of early jazz and blues recordings.

== Life and career ==
Born in the Ottakring district of Vienna, Parth grew up listening to traditional Viennese folk music, but was attracted to jazz records played by friends who were active in the Austrian resistance movement in the Second World War. After studying art he became a portrait painter and restorer of old paintings. He also started acquiring a library of old jazz and blues 78 rpm records, and became keen to share them among fellow collectors and aficionados.

In the mid-1950s he started the Jazz Perspective record label, releasing short runs of LPs with hand printed covers, as well as two box sets, one covering the history of jazz music and a second covering the history of blues music. He also became the owner of the Hot Club de Vienne (now the Jazz Land club), setting up a second record label under that name, and organised music parties on riverboats on the Danube. He played the cornet and led the Blue Danube Jass Band, and organised the first Catholic "jazz mass" in Europe, as well as leading the Alpha and Omega Brass Band Vienna, which played on left wing marches.

Working with his then-wife Evelyn Hruby (1941–2016), and inspired by discussions with Chris Strachwitz of Arhoolie Records, he co-founded the Roots label. This initially recorded and issued albums of traditional Austrian music, but soon concentrated on reissues of vintage blues recordings by such musicians as Blind Lemon Jefferson as well as compilations. Working with record collectors and music historians from around the world, the Roots label released about 60 LPs before folding in the 1970s.

Parth continued to work as an artist. He returned to music production in the late 1970s, when he produced recordings of Austrian folk music by Heini Griuc and others for the Earl Archives label. In the mid-1980s he began to consider the possibility of producing albums that compiled, in chronological order, the complete recorded works of pre-war musicians, particularly blues and gospel singers, but excluding those whose recordings had already been reissued by other labels. After finding a record pressing plant in Budapest who were prepared to produce low quantities of LPs at a reasonable cost, he set up Document Records in 1985, initially releasing records on vinyl before turning to CD production. Under Parth's supervision, Document's output became prolific, achieving its goal of re-issuing comprehensive sets of recordings of many early blues performers, and was also critically acclaimed.

He sold Document Records to a Scottish couple, Gary and Gillian Atkinson, in 2000. In the following year, 2001, Parth won the Keeping The Blues Alive Award from the Blues Foundation.

Parth died on 8 May 2025, at the age of 95.
