= Lillian Goodner =

American singer

Lillian Goodner (née Paige; 1896–1994) was an American blues singer who performed in the classic female blues style popular during the 1920s. She was billed as "Sister Lillian: Queen of the Sepias".

== Biography ==
She was born in Montgomery, Alabama and grew up in Chicago, Illinois. Her abilities as a vocalist were recognized early. She entered and won amateur contests before embarking on a professional career, in which she toured the country with her childhood friend, Mae Crowder, in an act billed as the Creole Sisters. She was in the cast of the revue Put and Take, which opened in New York in 1921 and subsequently toured.

In 1923–24, Goodner recorded six sides for Ajax Records in New York City. Some of these recordings are notable because they reveal a contradiction in the roles women sang about playing in early blues. In one song, "Gonna Get Somebody's Daddy," Goodner sings about having an affair with a married man, boasting "I'm gonna get somebody's daddy for my own, for my own, for my own." However, in another song recorded in the very same session, "Four Flushing Papa," Goodner scolds an unfaithful lover, with "I'm the only queen you can have in your jack."

In the 1920s, she toured major cities in the United States, Canada, Europe and Australia. In the early 1930s she performed with Duke Ellington and his band. After marrying William Penn she settled in Minneapolis and continued to work in nightclubs in the American Midwest. During World War II, Goodner performed in U.S.O. shows in Detroit and Oakland, California; in 1942 she appeared at Maxwell Field in Montgomery with Glenn Miller. She continued to play club dates in the 1950s and performed on WTCN-TV in Minneapolis.

By 1960, after the death of her husband, she had returned to Alabama. She occasionally performed at private parties until the 1970s, when she entered a nursing home. In 1994, a few months before Goodner's death, her collection of publicity photos of entertainers was found in a storage shed. These photographs, many of which she had taken herself, included images of Josephine Baker, Cab Calloway, Bessie Smith, Valaida Snow, Glenn Miller, Etta Moten, and many others whose names are less familiar. According to writer Marc Bankert, "in some cases, Lillian's photographs represent the only known images of the once-celebrated performers of her era".

== Recordings ==
Recorded for Ajax Records in December 1923, accompanied by Her Jazzin' Trio

- "Chicago Blues"
- "No One Can Toddle Like My Cousin Sue"

Recorded for Ajax Records in February 1924, accompanied by Grainger's Novelty Three (assumed to be Porter Grainger)

- "Awful Moanin' Blues"
- "Ramblin' Blues"

Recorded for Ajax Records in February 1924, accompanied by Her Sawin' Three (James "Bubber" Miley, cornet; Bob Fuller, alto sax; Lou Hooper, piano)

- "Four Flushing Papa (You've Got To Play Me Straight)"
- "Gonna Get Somebody's Daddy (Just Wait And See)"

== Discography ==
Goodner's complete recorded works were reissued by Document Records on the compilation album Female Blues Singers, Vol. 6: E/F/G (1922–1929) (DOCD-5510).
