= Romeo Nelson =

Iromeio "Romeo" Nelson (March 12, 1902 – May 17, 1974) was an American boogie woogie pianist whose recordings from 1929 are regarded as some of the finest, and certainly the fastest, boogie woogie showpieces on record.

== Biography ==
Nelson's grave at Restvale Cemetery

Born in Springfield, Tennessee, he moved to Chicago at the age of six. For most of his life he played piano at rent parties in the city, although he also lived in East St. Louis for a while in the early 1920s.

In 1929, he made his only series of recordings for Vocalion Records. These included "Gettin' Dirty Just Shakin' That Thing", renowned for its raunchy "signifying" lyrics, and "Head Rag Hop", featuring talking by Tampa Red and Frankie Jaxon.

"Head Rag Hop" also was released on the Brunswick Collector Series label, which read: "Head Rag Hop", Romeo Nelson, recorded September 1929. On the b-side of this 78 rpm record is "Wilkins Street Stomp", by Speckled Red. The record was part of a Brunswick album titled: Boogie Woogie Piano, Historic Recordings by Pioneer Piano Men. Also featured were: Montana Taylor, Speckled Red, and Cow Cow Davenport.

Nelson died of renal failure in Chicago in May 1974. In 2016 the Killer Blues Headstone Project placed a headstone for Romeo Nelson at Restvale Cemetery in Alsip, Illinois.
