= Montana Taylor =

American boogie-woogie and blues pianist (1903 – c. 1958)

- Born: Arthur Taylor c.1903 Butte, Montana or Indianapolis (uncertain), U.S.
- Died: c.1958 (aged 54–55) (probably) Cleveland, Ohio, U.S.
- Genres: Boogie-woogie, Piano blues
- Occupations: Pianist, singer
- Instruments: Piano, vocal
- Years active: 1923–1929, 1946
- Label: Vocalion

Arthur "Montana" Taylor (1903 – c.1958) was an American boogie-woogie and piano blues pianist, best known for his recordings in the 1940s, and regarded as the leading exponent of the "barrelhouse" style of playing.

== Life and career ==
Details of Taylor's life are obscure. He was born either in Butte, Montana, where his father owned a club, or in Indianapolis. The family seem to have moved to Chicago and then, around 1910, to Indianapolis, where Taylor learned piano. Later he moved to Cleveland, Ohio. By 1929 he was back in Chicago, where he recorded a few tracks for Vocalion Records, including "Indiana Avenue Stomp" and "Detroit Rocks".

He then disappeared from the public record for some years, during which he may have given up playing piano. However, in 1946 he was rediscovered by jazz fan Rudi Blesh, and was recorded both solo and as the accompanist to Bertha "Chippie" Hill. The later recordings proved he had lost none of his instrumental abilities, and had developed as a singer.

Taylor's final recordings were from a 1946 radio broadcast, and after that he was reportedly working as a chauffeur.

Montana Taylor died soon after 1957, when he was last recorded as living in Cleveland.

In 1977, Taylor's complete recordings were compiled by Martin van Olderen for the Oldie Blues label. Included were two then recently discovered radio performances from 1946. In 2002 Document Records released the complete recordings on CD.

== Discography ==
=== Singles ===
- 1929 – "Whoop and Holler Stomp" b/w "Hayride Stomp" (Vocalion) – 78 rpm
- 1929 – "Indiana Avenue Stomp" b/w "Detroit Rocks" (Vocalion) – 78 rpm

=== Albums ===
- 1977 – Montana's Blues (Oldie Blues) – compilation LP with Montana Taylor's complete recordings
- 2002 – Complete Recorded Works in Chronological Order 1929–1946 (Document Records) – compilation CD with Montana Taylor's complete recordings
