= Katie Crippen =

American singer

Catherine "Katie" Crippen (November 17, 1895 – November 25, 1929), also billed as Little Katie Crippen or Ella White, was an American entertainer and singer.

== Career ==
Crippen was born in Philadelphia to an African-American family. She performed at Edmond's Cellar in New York City about 1920. In 1921, she recorded four sides for Black Swan Records in the classic female blues style under her name and one under the pseudonym of Ella White, accompanied by Fletcher Henderson's Orchestra. She toured in 1922–23 as the star of a revue, "Liza and Her Shuffling Sextet", which included Fats Waller. She subsequently formed a revue, "Katie Crippen and Her Kids", in which she was accompanied by a teenaged Count Basie. She was managed by her husband and musician Lou Henry.

In the later 1920s she appeared in revues at the Lafayette Theater in New York City and toured the RKO theater circuit with Dewey Brown as Crippen & Brown.

After a long illness, Crippen died of cancer in New York City on November 25, 1929. She is buried in Merion Memorial Park, in Bala Cynwyd, Pennsylvania, outside of Philadelphia.

Crippen's complete recordings have been reissued in CD format by Document Records on Fletcher Henderson and the Blues Singers: Complete Recorded Works in Chronological Order Volume 1 (1921–1923) (DODC-5342).
