= Georgia White =

American singer

Georgia White (9 March 1903 – 1980) was an American blues singer, most prolific in the 1930s and 1940s.

White, who was of African American heritage, was born in Sandersville, Georgia in 1903. By the late 1920s she was singing in clubs in Chicago. She made her first recording, "When You're Smiling, the Whole World Smiles With You," with Jimmie Noone's orchestra in 1930. She returned to the studio in 1935, and over the next six years recorded over 100 tracks for Decca Records, usually accompanied by the pianist Richard M. Jones and also, in the late 1930s, by the guitarist Lonnie Johnson.

White also recorded under the name Georgia Lawson. Her tracks included "I'll Keep Sitting on It," "Take Me for a Buggy Ride," "Mama Knows What Papa Wants When Papa's Feeling Blue," and "Hot Nuts." Her best-known song was "You Done Lost Your Good Thing Now" (1935).

White formed an all-female band in the 1940s. She also performed with Bumble Bee Slim and Gassy Slaps. She joined Big Bill Broonzy's Laughing Trio in 1949 as pianist. "She was very easy to get along with," said Broonzy, "real friendly." She was a club singer in the 1950s, finally performing in 1959 in Chicago. She then resumed performing on weekends at the Blue Pub, a bar on Irving Park Road near the Kennedy Expressway, where she quickly won a loyal following. She sang many of her famous songs, including "Maybe I'm Wrong Again," a ballad from an early Bing Crosby movie.

One of her songs, "Alley Boogie" (recorded in 1937), was used as the theme music for the British romantic comedy drama series, Love Soup.

White's version of "Hot Nuts" was featured in the 2022 film, Jackass Forever.

== See also ==
- List of classic female blues singers
