= Virginia Liston =

American singer (c. 1890–1932)

Background information
- Born: Virginia Crawford c. 1890; Louisiana, U.S.
- Died: June 1932 St. Louis, Missouri
- Genres: Classic female blues, jazz
- Occupations: Singer, songwriter
- Years active: 1912–1929
- Labels: Okeh, Vocalion

Virginia Liston (née Crawford; c. 1890 – June 1932) was an American classic female blues and jazz singer. She spent most of her career in vaudeville. She performed with her husband, Samuel H. Gray, as Liston and Liston. In the 1920s she made a series of recordings that included performances with Clarence Williams and his Blue Five on "You've Got the Right Key, but the Wrong Keyhole" and "Early in the Morning", and with the Clarence Williams Washboard Band on "Cushion Foot Stomp", and "P.D.Q. Blues".

== Biography ==
Little is known about her childhood. It is thought that she was born around 1890 in Louisiana, although U.S. census records suggest that she may have been born in Mississippi. By the time she was ten years old, she and her family were living in New Orleans. She was working in local theaters in 1909 and was performing in Texas by 1910. In 1911 she married Dave Liston, a singer. The couple apparently were separated by 1913, but she kept his surname for the rest of her career. In about 1912, she was performing as a blues singer at the Segal Theater in Philadelphia. She subsequently lived in Washington, D.C., until the early 1920s.

From 1920 to 1923, she performed in a duo with her new husband, pianist Sam Gray, as Liston and Liston. They performed in the South on the Theatre Owners Booking Association (T.O.B.A.) vaudeville circuit between 1920 and 1923, while also playing theaters in Philadelphia and Atlantic City. She regularly performed in Harlem theaters, and settled in New York City in about 1923.

Liston met pianist Clarence Williams in the early 1920s. She made her first recordings with him for Okeh Records in September 1923. Thirty-six tracks were released until 1926 by Okeh and Vocalion. These included performances with Louis Armstrong and Sidney Bechet. In January 1924, Liston and Sam Gray together recorded two songs, "You Can Have It (I Don't Want It)" and "Just Take One Long Last Lingering Look", for Okeh. By 1925 they were divorced.

In 1927, Liston made her final recording session, singing "Cushion Foot Stomp" and "P.D.Q. Blues" with the Clarence Williams Washboard Band. Her song "You Don't Know My Mind Blues" was credited to the songwriting team of Gray, Liston and Williams. Sexual innuendo appears in songs such as "Rolls Royce Papa", written by Liston and recorded in 1926, in which she sang of a man with a "bent piston rod". Another song was titled "You Can Dip Your Bread in My Gravy, but You Can't Have None of My Chops".

In 1929, Liston remarried and announced her retirement from show business. She moved to St. Louis, Missouri, and worked for a church. She died in St. Louis in June 1932.

== Discography ==
- Complete Recorded Works in Chronological Order, vol. 1 (1923–1924), Document, 2000
- Complete Recorded Works in Chronological Order, vol. 2 (1924–1926), Document, 2000; the album also contains Lavinia Turner, Complete Recorded Works in Chronological Order (1921–1922)

== See also ==
- List of classic female blues singers
