= Gus Aiken =

American jazz trumpeter

Augustus Aiken, better known as Gus Aiken and sometimes incorrectly spelled Gus Aitken, (July 26, 1902 – April 1, 1973) was an American jazz and blues trumpeter who had an active career from the 1910s through the 1960s. He was a prolific recording artist, beginning with some of the earliest recording made by Okeh Records. He made recordings with many well known jazz artists, among them Louis Armstrong, Sidney Bechet, Ethel Waters, and Mamie Smith.

== Life and career ==
Augustus Aiken was born in Charleston, South Carolina on July 26, 1902. He was raised in the Jenkins Orphanage where he received extensive musical training. He played in the Jenkins Orphanage band alongside his younger brother, the trombonist Bud Aikin, and toured extensively with the school band in the 1910s.

By the time Aiken was 17 years old he was performing and recording professionally; notably playing on some of the earliest recordings made by Okeh Records featuring the singer Mamie Smith. By 1921 he had moved to New York City where he was playing in Fletcher Henderson's band, the Black Swan Masters. He toured with that group, which included the singer Ethel Waters, in 1921-1922. From 1922-1924 he played with the Real Jazzers of Jazz which backed the singer Gonzell White. With that group he toured to Cuba in 1923.

Aiken was a prolific recording artist in the mid to late 1920s on records made with the pianist, songwriter, and producer Perry Bradford. In 1925 he played in Perry Bradford's Jazz Phools with Louis Armstrong. He plays in a variety of shows in New York in the late 1920s, and in 1927 he recorded with the blues and vaudeville singer Clara Smith. After this he joined Luis Russell's band in which he usually played first trumpet. Other members in the group at the time he joined included clarinetists Barney Bigard and Omer Simeon, and double bass player Pops Foster. In 1929 the group recorded with Louis Armstrong.

In 1930 Aiken recorded with Charlie Johnson and his band, and also played for a short period with the Mills Blue Rhythm Band. He returned to Louis Russell's band with whom he made further recordings in 1931. From 1931-1933 he worked with Elmer Snowden and his band the Washingtonians whose members also included pianist Duke Ellington, drummer Sid Catlett, trombonist Dicky Wells, and trumpeter Roy Eldridge. In 1934 he played with Lucky Millinder and his band before once again returning to play in Russell's band. He stayed in Russell's band while it was under the leadership of Louis Armstrong from 1934 through 1937. He made numerous recordings with Armstrong during this period, also appeared on record with the band in recordings featuring Sidney Bechet. He left the group in the latter part of 1937 to join the band of Alberto Socarras.

In 1941 Aiken made four recordings with Sidney Bechet. He then played in Buddy Johnson's band in the early to mid 1940s. In the late 1940s he worked as free-lance musician in New York City. In the early 1950s he played with Jimmy Archey and his band. At this point the rise of Rock and roll in the 1950s led to the end of big band jazz era, and his work with prominent recording artists ceased. He continued to work in society bands and in gig work to support himself. In the 1960s he led his own band.

Gus Aiken died in New York City on April 1, 1973.
