= Trixie Smith =

American blues singer and film actress (c.1885–1943)

- Also known as: Trixie Muse
- Born: c.1885–1895 Atlanta, Georgia, United States
- Died: September 21, 1943 (age 47–58) New York City, United States
- Genre: Blues
- Occupations: Vocalist, actress
- Years active: 1920s – 1930s
- Labels: Black Swan; Paramount; Decca

Trixie Smith (c.1885/1895 – September 21, 1943), was an American blues singer and film actress. She made four dozen recordings and appeared in five films.

== Biography ==
Born and raised in Atlanta, Georgia, Smith came from a middle-class background. Various years are given for her birth including 1885, 1888, and 1895. She attended Selma University, in Alabama, before moving to New York City at the age of twenty in around 1915. Soon after, she began working in a number of different cafés and theaters in Harlem and Philadelphia.

She began her career as a vaudeville and minstrel entertainer who performed as a comedian, dancer, actress, and singer in traveling shows. Between 1916 and the early 1920s, she worked in minstrel shows and toured as a featured singer. She performed on Broadway using the name Bessie Lee and recorded for Silvertone. She also worked on the Theater Owners Booking Association vaudeville circuit, before making her first recordings for Black Swan Records in 1922, among which was "My Man Rocks Me (With One Steady Roll)" (1922), written by J. Berni Barbour, of historical interest as the first record to refer to "rocking" and "rolling" in a secular context. Her record inspired various lyrical elaborations, such as "Rock That Thing" by Lil Johnson and "Rock Me Mama" by Ikey Robinson.

Also in 1922, billed as the "southern nightingale," Smith won first place and a silver cup in a blues singing contest in which she sang her own composition, "Trixie's Blues", competing against Alice Leslie Carter, Daisy Martin and Lucille Hegamin, at the Inter-Manhattan Casino in New York, sponsored by the dancer Irene Castle. She is perhaps best remembered for "Railroad Blues" (1925) and "The World Is Jazz Crazy and So Am I" (1925). Louis Armstrong played the cornet on both songs.

Smith was a polished performer, and her records include several outstanding examples of the blues, on which she is accompanied by artists such as James P. Johnson, and Freddie Keppard. She recorded with Fletcher Henderson's Orchestra for Paramount Records in 1924 and 1925. By the late 1930s her formerly girlish voice became more full-bodied, and her performance style more direct and sexual. Later rhythm-and-blues and soul singers would adopt this approach.

As her career as a blues singer waned, Smith sustained herself mostly by performing in cabaret revues and starring in musical revues such as New York Revue (1928) and Next Door Neighbors (1928) at the Lincoln Theater in Harlem. She also appeared in Mae West's short-lived 1931 Broadway show The Constant Sinner. Two years later, Smith was elevated to the stage of the Theatre Guild for its production of Louisiana.

Smith appeared in five films: Birthright (1938), God's Step Children (1938), Swing! (1938), Drums o' Voodoo (1934), and The Black King (1932). Two of these films were directed by Oscar Micheaux. She appeared at the concert From Spirituals to Swing, produced by John H. Hammond in 1938. Smith recorded seven titles in 1938 and 1939. Most of her later recordings were with Sidney Bechet for Decca Records in 1938. In 1939, she cut "No Good Man" with a band including Red Allen and Barney Bigard.

Known in later life as Trixie Muse, she died in New York in 1943, after a brief illness, at the age of 48.

In 2017, her song "Jack I'm Mellow" was featured as the theme song for the TV comedy sitcom Disjointed.

== Discography ==
- 1922-24 - Complete Recorded Works in Chronological Order, vol. 1 (Document Recs., 1995)
- 1925-39 - Complete Recorded Works in Chronological Order, vol. 2 (Document Recs., 1995)
