= Lincoln Theatre (Harlem) =

Theatre in Harlem, New York City (opened 1915)

- Interactive map of Lincoln Theatre
- Former names: Nickelette (until 1909)
- Address: 58 W. 135th Street; New York City, New York; 10037; United States
- Coordinates: 40°48′49″N 73°56′25″W
- Owner: Maria C. Downs

Construction
- Opened: 1915

The Lincoln Theatre is a theater located on 135th Street near Lenox Avenue in Harlem, New York City. It opened in 1915 and was the first theater in a then-predominantly-white neighborhood in Harlem to cater to black audiences. The theater reached its peak of fame in the 1920s, when entertainers such as Bessie Smith, Florence Mills, and Fats Waller headlined. (Fats Waller had been hired as the organist of the theater when he was 15 years old.) The Lincoln Theatre was the only place in New York where Ma Rainey performed.

== Background ==
The theater was originally a nickelodeon called the Nickelette. In 1909, the building was purchased by Maria C. Downs, who increased the seating and changed its name to the Lincoln Theatre. Due to the Great Migration happening around this time, more African Americans were moving to Harlem; however, many of the theaters in Harlem were segregated or completely closed to black audiences. Downs made the Lincoln into a theater for black people, hosting black shows and black performers, then had the current Lincoln Theatre building constructed in 1915.
