= Lucille Hegamin =

American singer and entertainer (1894–1970)

- Born: Lucille Nelson; November 29, 1894; Macon, Georgia, United States
- Died: March 1, 1970 (aged 75) New York, United States
- Genres: Classic female blues
- Occupations: Singer, entertainer
- Years active: 1910–1934; 1961–1962

Lucille Nelson Hegamin (November 29, 1894 – March 1, 1970) was an American singer and entertainer and an early African-American blues recording artist.

== Life and career ==
Lucille Nelson was born in Macon, Georgia, the daughter of John and Minnie Nelson. From an early age she sang in local church choirs and theatre programs. By the age of 15 she was touring the US South with the Leonard Harper Minstrel Stock Company. In 1914 she settled in Chicago, Illinois, where, often billed as "The Georgia Peach", she worked with Tony Jackson and Jelly Roll Morton before marrying the pianist-composer Bill Hegamin. She later told a biographer, "I was a cabaret artist in those days, and never had to play theatres, and I sang everything from blues to popular songs, in a jazz style. I think I can say without bragging that I made the 'St. Louis Blues' popular in Chicago; this was one of my feature numbers."

The Hegamins moved to Los Angeles, California, in 1918, then to New York City the following year. Bill Hegamin led the band accompanying his wife, the Blue Flame Syncopators; Jimmy Wade was a member of this ensemble.

In November 1920, Hegamin became the second African-American blues singer to record, after Mamie Smith. Hegamin made a series of recordings for Arto Records and then Paramount in 1922. One of her biggest hits was "Arkansas Blues", recorded for Arto and released on many other labels, including Black Swan. She recorded one of Tom Delaney's earliest compositions, "Jazz Me Blues", in 1921, and it went on to become a jazz standard. She subsequently played theatre dates but did not tour extensively.

Lucille Hegamin lived at the Shuffle Inn in Harlem from November 1921 to January 1922. On January 20, 1922, she competed in a blues singing contest with Daisy Martin, Alice Leslie Carter and Trixie Smith at the Fifteenth Infantry's First Band Concert and Dance in New York City. Hegamin placed second to Smith in the contest, which was held at the Manhattan Casino. Then from February to May of that year she toured with the African-American musical revue Shuffle Along, and this was the second of three companies. In the first company Florence Mills had the same role with the same musical revue.

From 1922 through late 1926 she recorded over forty sides for Cameo Records; in this association she was billed as "The Cameo Girl". After her marriage to Bill Hegamin ended in 1923, her most frequent accompanist was the pianist J. Cyrill Fullerton. In 1926, she recorded with Clarence Williams's band for the Columbia label. She sang with a band that was led by George "Doc" Hyder in 1927 for a show in Philadelphia. Further into the decade she performed in further revues with Hyder that were staged in Harlem theaters.

She performed in Williams's Revue at the Lincoln Theater in New York and then in various revues in New York and Atlantic City, New Jersey, through 1934. In 1929 she performed on the radio program Negro Achievement Hour, on WABC, in New York. In 1932 she recorded two sides for Okeh Records.

About 1934, she retired from music as a profession and worked as a nurse. She came out of retirement in 1961 to record four songs, accompanied by a band led by Willie "The Lion" Smith, on the album Songs We Taught Your Mother, for Bluesville Records. In 1962 she recorded Basket of Blues for Spivey Records. She performed at a benefit concert for Mamie Smith at the Celebrity Club in New York City in 1964.

Hegamin died in Harlem Hospital, in New York City, on March 1, 1970, and was interred in the Cemetery of the Evergreens, in Brooklyn, New York.

== Partial discography ==
Single	Recording date	Recording location	Label
"Always Be Careful Mama"	September 1928	New York City	Cameo
"Bleeding Hearted Blues"	August 1923	New York City	Cameo
"Chattanooga Man"	October 1923	New York City	Cameo
"Dinah"	February 1926	New York City	Cameo
"Down Hearted Blues"	August 1923	New York City	Cameo
"Easy Goin' Mamma (Don't Play Hard to Get with Me)"	October 1924	New York City	Cameo
"Hard Hearted Hannah"	October 1924	New York City	Cameo
"Here Comes Malinda"	March 1926	New York City	Cameo
"Land of Cotton Blues"	August 1923	New York City	Cameo
"No Man's Mama"	February 1926	New York City	Cameo
"Poor Papa (He's Got Nuthin' at All)"	February 1926	New York City	Cameo
"Rampart St. Blues"	October 1923	New York City	Cameo
"Reckless Daddy"	September 1928	New York City	Cameo
"Shake Your Cans"	March 1932	New York City	Cameo
"Some Early Morning"	August 1923	New York City	Okeh
'Sweet Papa Joe"	August 1923	New York City	Cameo
"Syncopatin' Mama"	March 1923	New York City	Cameo
"Totem Pole"	March 1932	New York City	Cameo
"Wanna Go South Again Blues"	August 1923	New York City	Okeh
"Your Man – My Man"	March 1923	New York City	Cameo

== Style ==
Hegamin's stylistic influences included Annette Hanshaw and Ruth Etting. According to Derrick Stewart-Baxter, "Lucille's clear, rich voice, with its perfect diction, and its jazz feeling, was well in the vaudeville tradition, and her repertoire was wide." Like Mamie Smith, Hegamin sang classic female blues in a lighter style, more influenced by pop tunes, than the rougher rural-style blues singers such as Ma Rainey and Bessie Smith, who became more popular a few years later.

== Bibliography ==
- Gates, H. L., Higginbotham, E. B., and American Council of Learned Societies. (2009). Harlem Renaissance Lives from the African American National Biography. Oxford: Oxford University Press. ISBN 0195387953.
- Harris, Sheldon (1994). Blues Who's Who. (Rev. ed.) New York: Da Capo Press. ISBN 0-306-80155-8.
- Harrison, Daphne Duval (1990). Black Pearls: Blues Queens of the 1920s. New Brunswick and London: Rutgers. ISBN 0813512808.
- Stewart-Baxter, Derrick (1970). Ma Rainey and the Classic Blues Singers. London: Studio Vista. ISBN 0-289-79825-6.
