= Clara Smith =

American blues singer (1894–1935)

- Born: March 13, 1894; Spartanburg County, South Carolina, United States
- Died: February 2, 1935 (aged 40) Detroit, Michigan, United States
- Genre: Classic female blues
- Occupation: Singer
- Instrument: Vocals
- Years active: 1910–1935
- Label: Columbia

Clara Smith (March 13, 1894 – February 2, 1935) was an American classic female blues singer, billed as the "Queen of the Moaners", although she had a lighter voice than many of her contemporaries.

== Early life ==
Clara Smith was born to parents Selena and William Smith in Spartanburg County, South Carolina. She is not believed to have any siblings. She never was enrolled in school but was recorded on the census as able to read and write. Blues historians think that Smith most likely was introduced in her youth to "traveling tent shows", that frequently stopped in Spartanburg and sparked her interest in performance.

== Career ==
In 1910, Smith began working on African-American theater circuits, in tent shows, and vaudeville. By 1918, she was appearing as a headliner with the Theater Owners Booking Association circuit across Southern states. By 1923, she had performed at major theatres of the time such as the Lyric in New Orleans, the Dream Theatre in Columbus, Georgia, the Bijou Theatre in Nashville, and the Booker T. Washington Theatre in St. Louis.

In 1923, she settled in New York City, appearing at cabarets and speakeasies there. She was then signed to a recording contract, and the same year she made the first of her commercially successful series of gramophone recordings with Columbia Records, working with many other musicians such as Fletcher Henderson, Louis Armstrong, and Don Redman. She recorded three duets with Bessie Smith: "Far Away Blues" and "I'm going back to My Used To Be" (Columbia 13007-D), on October 4, 1923 and "My Man Blues" (Columbia 14098-D), on September 1, 1925. She recorded Tom Delaney's "Troublesome Blues" in 1927. Initially a singer of depressing ballads, she later began recording more uptempo numbers. Her May 1926 recording of "Whip It to a Jelly" was noted as "one of the more overt sexual blues". Smith cut 122 sides, all with Columbia Records, with her record sales being topped only by Bessie Smith. Clara Smith was known across the U.S., even performing on the West Coast, which was rare for a blues singer.

During her time performing, Smith met young Josephine Baker and chose to mentor her. Smith is accredited for giving Baker her start in the recording business, having hired Baker when aged 13 as her dresser. Smith and Baker are thought to have had a romantic relationship for a time, notably being referred to as "lady lovers" by a colleague.

In 1933, she was on the road in Detroit, Michigan and worked at theaters in revues there until she succumbed to heart disease in February 1935, a month short of her 41st birthday.

== Discography ==
- 1923-24 - Complete Recorded Works in Chronological Order Vol. 1 (Document Recs, 1995)
- 1924-00 - Complete Recorded Works in Chronological Order Vol. 2 (Document Recs, 1995)
- 1925-00 - Complete Recorded Works in Chronological Order Vol. 3 (Document Recs, 1995)
- 1926-27 - Complete Recorded Works in Chronological Order Vol. 4 (Document Recs, 1995)
- 1927-29 - Complete Recorded Works in Chronological Order Vol. 5 (Document Recs, 1995)
- 1930-32 - Complete Recorded Works in Chronological Order Vol. 6 (Document Recs, 1995)
- 1924-29 - The Essential Clara Smith (Retrieval, 2001)

=== 78' Rpm ===
- "I Never Miss the Sunshine (I'm So Used to the Rain)" / "Awful Moanin' Blues" (1923) with Fletcher Henderson
- "I Got Everything A Woman Needs" / "Every Woman's Blues" (1923)
- "Irresistible Blues" / "I Want My Sweet Daddy Now" (1923)
- "All Night Blues" / "Play It (Do It a Long Time Papa)" (1923)
- "Kind Lovin' Blues" / "Down South Blues" (1923)
- "Don't Never Tell Nobody" / "Waitin' for the Evenin' Mail" (1923)
- "Far Away Blues" / "I'm Going Back to My Used to Be" (1923) with Bessie Smith
- "I'm Gonna Tear Your Playhouse Down" / "You Don't Know My Mind" (1924)
- "Mean Papa Turn in Your Key" / "Back Woods Blues" (1924)
- "San Francisco Blues" / "Chain Gang Blues" (1924) with George Williams
- "Good Looking Papa Blues" / "Don't Advertise Your Man" (1924)
- "Kansas City Man Blues" / "Uncle Sam Blues" (1924)
- "The Basement Blues" / "Mama's Gone, Good Bye" (1924)
- "Freight Train Blues" / "Done Sold My Soul to the Devil (And My Heart's Done Turned to Stone)" (1924)
- "West Indies Blues" / "The Clearing House Blues" (1924)
- "He's Mine, All Mine" / "Steel Drivin' Sam" (1925)
- "The Market Street Blues" / "It Takes the Lawd (To Tell What's on My Mind)" (1925)
- "My Good for Nuthin' Man" / "When I Steps Out" (1925)
- "Nobody Knows the Way I Feel Dis Mornin'" / "If You Only Knowed" (1925)
- "Nobody's Blues but Mine" / "My Man Blues" (1925) with Bessie Smith and Her Band
- "Court House Blues" / "The L & N Blues" (1926)
- "How'm I Doin'" / "Whip It to a Jelly" (1926)
- "Ain't Nothin' Cookin' What You're Smellin'" / "Separation Blues" (1926)
- "Livin' Humble" / "Get on Board" (1927)
- "That's Why The Undertakers Are Busy Today" / "Black Woman's Blues" (1927)
- "Ease It" / "Percolatin' Blues" (1927)
- "Troublesome Blues" / "You Can't Get It Now" (1927)
- "Cheatin' Daddy" / "You Don't Know Who's Shakin' Your Tree" (1927) with Her Jazz Babies
- "Wanna Go Home" / "Ain't Got Nobody to Grind My Coffee" (1928)
- "Jelly Look What You Done Done" / "It's All Coming Home to You" (1928)
- "Steamboat Man Blues" / "Sobbin' Sister Blues" (1928)
- "Gin Mill Blues" / "Got My Mind on That Thing" (1929)
- "It's Tight Like That" / "Daddy Don't Put That Thing on Me Blues" (1929)
- "Papa I Don't Need You Now" / "Tired of the Way You Do" (1929)
- "Oh! Mister Mitchell" / "Where Is My Man" (1930)
- "Ol' Sam Tages" / "Unemployed Papa-Charity Workin' Mama" (1931)
- "For Sale" / "You Dirty Dog" (1931)
- "Broken Busted Blues" / "Court House Blues" with Louis Armstrong
- "Shipwrecked Blues" / "My John Blues"
- "Frosty Mornin' Blues" / "Easy Come Easy Go Blues"

and more

== See also ==
- List of blues musicians
- Classic female blues
- List of classic female blues singers
- List of vaudeville performers: L-Z
