= Bertha Hill =

American blues and vaudeville singer and dancer (1905–1950)

Bertha "Chippie" Hill
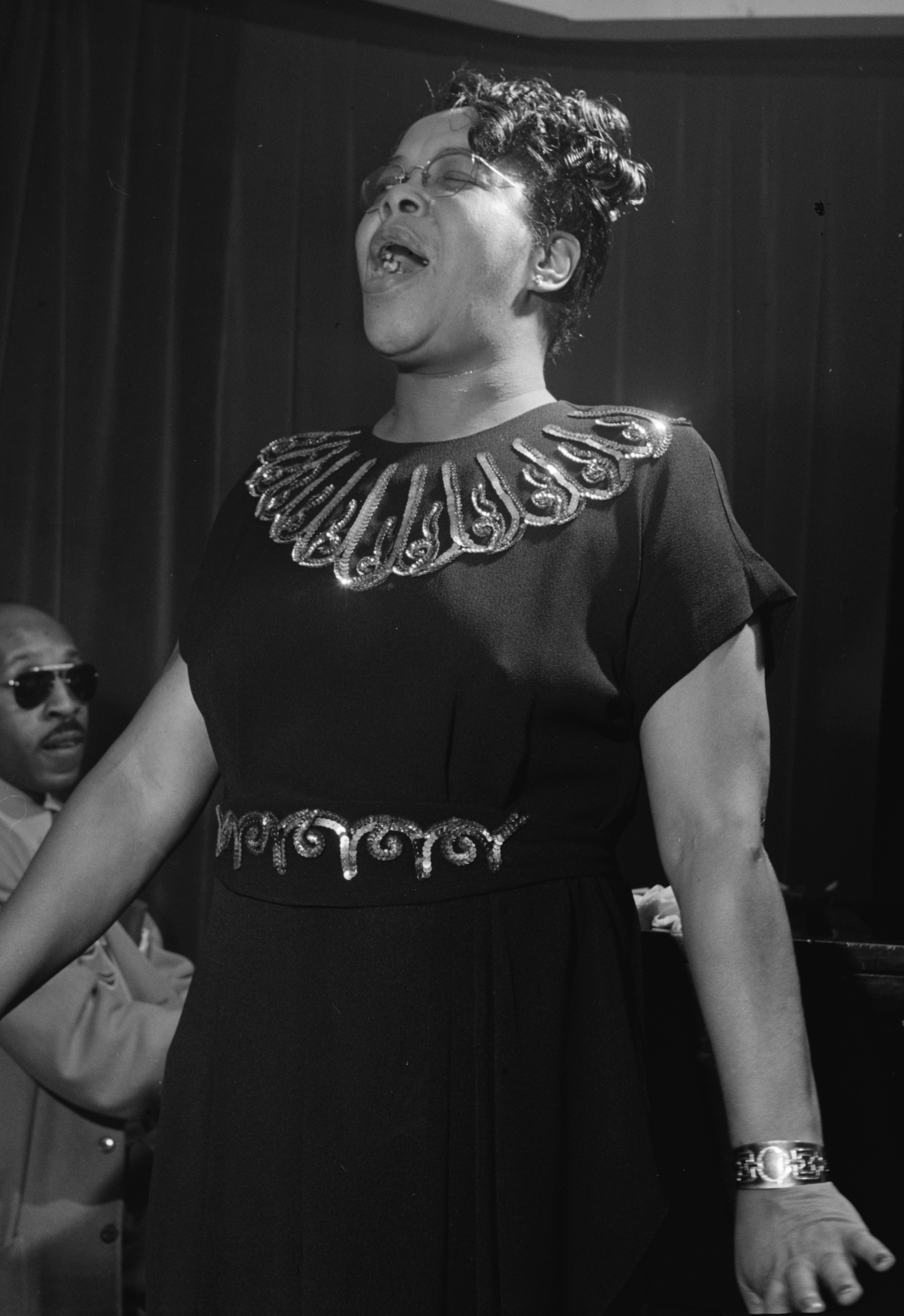
- Hill in New York City, between 1946 and 1948 (William P. Gottlieb)

Background information
- Born: March 15, 1905; Charleston, South Carolina, U.S.
- Died: May 7, 1950 (aged 45) New York City, U.S.
- Genres: Blues, vaudeville
- Occupation: Singer
- Years active: 1920s – 1950
- Labels: Okeh; Brunswick Records

Bertha "Chippie" Hill (March 15, 1905 – May 7, 1950), was an American blues and vaudeville singer and dancer, best known for her recordings with Louis Armstrong.

== Career ==
Hill was born on March 15, 1905, in Charleston, South Carolina, one of sixteen children. The family moved to New York in 1915 when she was 13 years old. She began her career as a dancer in Harlem and began working with Ethel Waters as a dancer in New York by 1919. At age 14, during a stint at Leroy's, a noted New York nightclub, Hill was nicknamed "Chippie" because of her youth. She performed with Ma Rainey as part of the Rabbit Foot Minstrels, where she was not just part of the troupe, but was a singer and dancer specifically. She later established her own song and dance act and toured on the TOBA circuit in the early 1920s.

Around 1925, she settled in Chicago, where she worked at various venues with King Oliver's Jazz Band. During this period, she performed with major Chicago musicians, including pianist and bandleader Lovie Austin, whose studio groups included Chippie on multiple tracks. She first recorded with Okeh Records, backed by the cornet player Louis Armstrong and the pianist Richard M. Jones. Together, they pressed such songs as "Pratt City Blues," "Low Land Blues," "Kid Man Blues," and "Georgia Man." Music scholars point out that Hill's 1926 version of "Trouble in Mind" stands out as an early blues interpretation with a structure different from many later versions. Her performance style has also been studied for its expressive vocal style and the way she portrays herself in the song, which reflect traits shared by early blues women. She and Lonnie Johnson recorded the vocal duet "Hard Times Blues", plus "Weary Money Blues", "Tell Me Why" and "Speedway Blues" in 1927, and in 1928, she recorded vocal duets with Tampa Red, singing "Hard Times Blues", "Christmas Man Blues", and another version of "Trouble in Mind" for Vocalion. In 1929, she recorded "Non-Skid Tread" with "Scrapper" Blackwell and the Two Roys and Leroy Carr on piano. Altogether, Hill recorded 23 titles between 1925 and 1929 and is best rememberedfor those that featured Louis Armstrong on cornet.

In the 1930s she retired from singing not only to raise her seven children but also because of the great depression that was happening at the time. However she would occasionally sing in Chicago theaters throughout the 1930s, she also had a long residency at Club DeLisa during the 1930s-early 1940s, she was rediscovered in 1946 by writer Rudi Blesh, she was also working at a bakery at the time. Hill returned to singing in the mid-1930s with Jimmie Noone as a collaborator. Following her work with Lovie Austin decades prior, Hill staged a comeback in 1946 with Austin's band the Blues Serenaders to record for Circle Records, founded by Rudi Blesh.

A 1947 entertainment report listed Hill as a returning performer, indicating that she was still active on stage after the war. She began appearing on radio and in clubs and concerts in New York, including in the 1948 Carnegie Hall concert with Kid Ory, the Paris Jazz Festiva, and with Art Hodes in Chicago.

In 1950, she was the victim of a pedestrian-auto crash in Harlem, New York, killing her at the age of 45. She is buried at the Lincoln Cemetery, Blue Island, Illinois.

== Musical Style ==
Hill's singing reflects qualities shared with early Black female blues singers, especially her emotional delivery and her focus on themes like love, resilience, strength and independence. Her recording reveal a mix of expressive phrasing and improvisation, qualities that the early women in blues often used to shape their musical identities.

== Legacy ==
Bertha "Chippie" Hill's recordings are still referenced today in modern music research, especially in studies that look at early blues styles and performance traditions. Scholars use her work as an example of how early blues women shaped the sound and structure of the blues.

== Selected discography ==
Year	Title	Genre	Label
2005	Complete Works, Vol. 1 (1925–1929)	Blues	Document
