= Paramount Records =

American record label

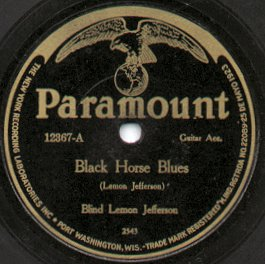
- 1926 disc label
- Founded: 1917; 109 years ago
- Founder: Wisconsin Chair Company
- Defunct: 1932; 94 years ago
- Status: Closed
- Distributor: Jazzology
- Genre: Jazz, blues
- Country of origin: U.S.
- Location: Ozaukee County, Wisconsin, U.S.
- Official website: www.jazzology.com

Paramount Records was an American record label known for its recordings of jazz and blues in the 1920s and early 1930s, including such artists as Ma Rainey, Tommy Johnson, Blind Blake and Blind Lemon Jefferson.

== Early years ==
Paramount Records was founded in 1918 by United Phonographs, a subsidiary of the Wisconsin Chair Company, which trademarked its record brand from Port Washington and began issuing records the following year on the Puritan and Paramount labels. Puritan lasted only until 1927, but Paramount, based in the factory of its parent company in Grafton, Wisconsin, published some of the nation's most important early blues recordings between 1929 and 1932. The label's offices were located in Port Washington, Wisconsin and the pressing plant was located at 1819 S. Green Bay Road in Grafton. The label was managed by Fred Dennett Key. Recordings often occurred at studios in Chicago.

The Wisconsin Chair Company made wooden phonograph cabinets for Edison Records. In 1915 it started making its own phonographs in the name of its subsidiary, the United Phonograph Corporation. It made phonographs under multiple brand names through the end of the decade; the brands failed commercially.

In 1918, a line of records debuted on the Paramount label. They were recorded and pressed by a Chair Company subsidiary, the New York Recording Laboratories, Inc. which, despite its name, was located in the same Wisconsin factory in Port Washington. Advertisements, however, stated: "Paramounts are recorded in our own New York laboratory".

In its early years, the Paramount label fared only slightly better than the Vista phonograph line. The product had little to distinguish itself. Paramount released pop recordings with average audio quality pressed on average quality shellac. With the coming of electric recording, both the audio fidelity and the shellac quality declined to well below average, although some Paramount records were well pressed on better shellac and have become collectible.

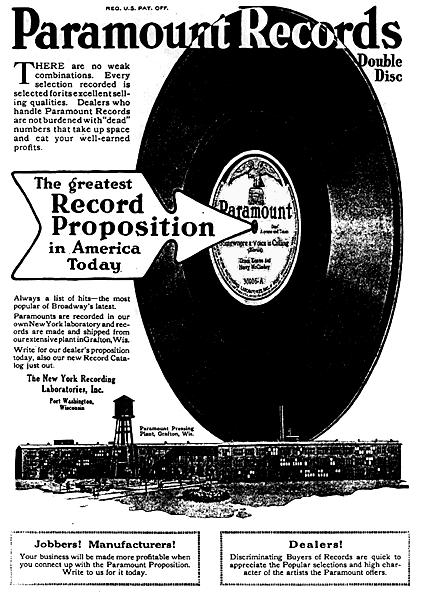
Paramount Records ad, 1919

In the early 1920s, Paramount was accumulating debt while producing no profit. Paramount began offering to press records for other companies on a contract basis at low prices.

== Race records ==
Paramount was contracted to press discs for Black Swan Records. When the Black Swan company later floundered, Paramount bought out Black Swan and made records by and for African Americans. These so-called race music records became Paramount's most famous and lucrative business, especially its 12000 series. It is estimated that a quarter of all "race records" released between 1922 and 1932 were on the Paramount label. The company relied on offices and agents in nearby Chicago to find and record artists for its blues and jazz offerings.

Paramount's race record series was launched in 1922 with vaudeville blues songs by Lucille Hegamin and Alberta Hunter. The company had a large mail-order operation which was a key to its early success.

Most of Paramount's race music recordings were arranged by black entrepreneur J. Mayo Williams. "Ink" Williams, as he was known, had no official position with Paramount, but he was given wide latitude to bring African American talent to the Paramount recording studios and to market Paramount records to African American consumers. Williams did not know at the time that the "race market" had become Paramount's prime business and that he was keeping the label afloat.

Problems with low fidelity and poor pressings continued. Blind Lemon Jefferson's 1926 hits, "Got the Blues" and "Long Lonesome Blues", were quickly rerecorded in the superior facilities of Marsh Laboratories, and subsequent releases used the rerecorded version. Both versions were released on compilation albums.

In 1927, Ink Williams moved to competitor Okeh, taking Blind Lemon Jefferson with him for just one recording, "Matchbox Blues". Paramount's recording of the same song can be compared with Okeh's on compilation albums. In 1929, Paramount was building a new studio in Grafton, so it sent Charley Patton —"sent up" by Jackson, Mississippi, storeowner H. C. Speir —to the studio of Gennett Records in Richmond, Indiana, where on June 14 he cut 14 famous sides, which led many to consider him the "Father of the Delta Blues".

After Williams left Paramount, he placed the business in the hands of his secretary, Aletha Dickerson, who had not been informed that her former employer had quit. Dickerson continued working for Paramount, and eventually moved to the company's new headquarters in Grafton. In 1931, she quit when the management, facing hard times, cut her wages.

== Depression, closure, reissues ==
The Great Depression drove many record companies out of business. Paramount stopped recording in 1932 and closed in 1935.

Like other record companies during the Great Depression, Paramount sold most of its master recordings as scrap metal. Some of the company's recordings were said to have been thrown into the Milwaukee River by disgruntled employees when the company was closing in the mid-1930s. A 2006 episode of the PBS television show History Detectives showed divers searching the river for Paramount masters and unsold 78s, but they were unsuccessful. Author Amanda Petrusich also dived in the river looking for records for her 2014 book Do Not Sell At Any Price, but did not find any.

When Riverside Records re-released the original recordings, they used records from the collection of John Hammond.

John Fahey's Revenant Records and Jack White's Third Man Records issued two volumes of remastered tracks from Paramount's catalog, The Rise and Fall of Paramount Records, Volume One (1917–27) and The Rise and Fall of Paramount Records, Volume Two (1928–32), on vinyl records with a USB drive for digital access. Each volume features 800 songs, contemporary ads and images (200 in volume one and 90 in volume 2), two books (a history of Paramount and a guide to the artists and recordings) and six 180-gram vinyl LPs, packaged in a hand-crafted oak case modeled after those that carried phonographs in the 1920s.

A small number of Paramount's single releases of catalog numbers between 12584 and 13131 still exist, many in poor condition, or some seemingly lost.

== See also ==
- List of record labels
- Paramount Records (1969)
- Puritan Records
