= Classic female blues =

Early form of blues music

- Stylistic origins: American folk music; work songs; spirituals; vaudeville
- Cultural origins: Early 20th century, Southern U.S.

Classic female blues was an early form of blues music, dominated by women that was popular in the 1920s in the United States. An amalgam of traditional folk blues and urban theater music, the style is also known as vaudeville blues. Classic blues were performed by female singers accompanied by pianists or small jazz ensembles and were the first blues to be recorded. Ma Rainey, Bessie Smith, Ethel Waters, and the other singers in this genre were instrumental in spreading the popularity of the blues. Women in blues were instrumental in influencing later genres of music such as jazz, rhythm & blues and rock and roll.

== History ==
=== Origin ===
Blues, a type of black folk music originating in the American South, were mainly in the form of work songs until about 1900. Gertrude "Ma" Rainey (1886–1939), known as "The Mother of the Blues", is credited as the first to perform the blues on stage as popular entertainment when she began incorporating blues into her act of show songs and comedy around 1902. Rainey had heard a woman singing about the man she had lost, learned the song, and began using it as her closing number, calling it "the blues". Rainey's example was followed by other young women who followed her path in the tent show circuit, one of the few venues available to black performers. Most toured through a circuit established by the black-owned Theatre Owners Booking Association (T.O.B.A.) on the East Coast and through the South as far west as Oklahoma.

A key figure in popularizing the blues was the composer W. C. Handy, who published the first of his blues songs in 1912. His compositions, notably "The Memphis Blues" and "St. Louis Blues", quickly became standards for blues singers. By the end of the 1910s, blues songs had become staples of Black stage shows. Songs modeled on Handy's were also performed and recorded by white vaudevillians, such as Sophie Tucker.

=== 1920s ===
Crazy Blues
Mamie Smith's performance of Perry Bradford's "Crazy Blues" in 1920

In 1919, Handy and the Harlem songwriter and music publisher Perry Bradford began a campaign to persuade record companies that black consumers would eagerly purchase recordings by black performers. Bradford's persistence led the General Phonograph Company to record the New York cabaret singer Mamie Smith in its Okeh studio on February 14, 1920. She recorded two non-blues songs, which were released without fanfare that summer but were commercially successful. Smith returned to the studio on August 10 and recorded "Crazy Blues", the first blues recorded by a black woman. The record sold over 75,000 copies in its first month, an extraordinary figure for the time. Smith became known as "America's First Lady of the Blues". In November 1920, the vaudeville singer Lucille Hegamin became the second black woman to record a blues song when she cut "Jazz Me Blues". Ethel Waters, Alberta Hunter, Mary Stafford, Katie Crippen, Edith Wilson, and Esther Bigeou, among others, made their first recordings before the end of 1921. Blues had become a nationwide craze, and the recording industry actively scouted, booked and recorded hundreds of black female singers.

Blues recordings were marketed exclusively to African Americans, largely by advertisements in black newspapers such as the Chicago Defender and the Pittsburgh Courier, and were typically labeled "race records" to distinguish them from records marketed to white audiences. However, the recordings of some of the classic female blues singers were popular with white buyers, for instance, Hegamin's recordings for Paramount Records in 1922, which were issued as part of Paramount's "popular" series rather than its "race" series. Marion Harris meanwhile became the first white female singer to credibly record the blues with tracks such as her versions of "Saint Louis Blues" and "Beale Street Blues". Annette Hanshaw also made some blues recordings, such as "Moanin' Low".

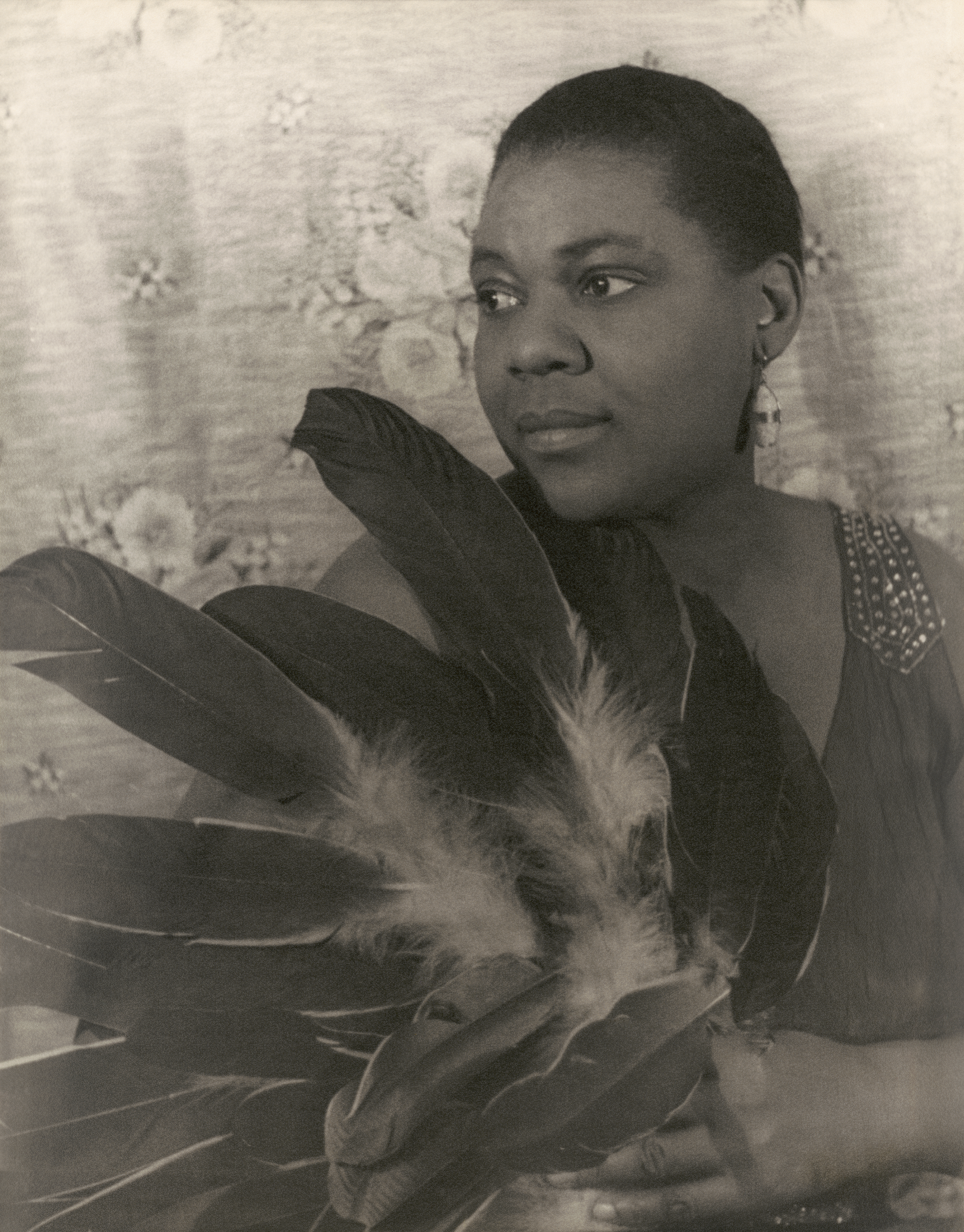
Bessie Smith was the highest-paid black artist of the 1920s

The most popular of the classic blues singers was Tennessee-born Bessie Smith, who first recorded in 1923. Known as the "Empress of the Blues", she possessed a large voice with a "T'ain't Nobody's Bizness if I Do" attitude. Smith was one of seven children born to Laura and William Smith. After her parents died, Smith was raised by her aunt, living in poverty. The first recorded performance of Smith was in 1909 when she was 14 years old. Smith (who was unrelated to Mamie Smith) later toured on the T.O.B.A. circuit starting in 1912, originally as a chorus girl; by 1918 she was appearing in her own revue in Atlantic City, New Jersey. She struggled initially to be recorded—three companies turned her down before she was signed by Columbia. She eventually became the highest-paid black artist of the 1920s, selling millions of records and recording over 160 songs. Smith attracted a large number of white people to her performances as well, however, her music explored the struggles of working-class black women.

Ma Rainey, whose popularity in the South was unrivaled, was little known in the cities of the North until 1923, when she made her first recordings. She and Bessie Smith brought about a change in the style of the classic blues, as audiences came to prefer their rougher, earthier sound to that of the lighter-voiced, more refined blues singers who had preceded them on record. Lyrically, their songs explored themes of love, sexuality, work, drinking and domestic violence, themes that were not talked about widely before classic female blues. Rainey recorded over 100 songs, 24 of them her own compositions. According to the jazz historian Dan Morgenstern, "Bessie Smith (and all the others who followed in time) learned their art and craft from Ma, directly or indirectly".

Other classic blues singers who recorded extensively until the end of the 1920s were Ida Cox, Clara Smith, Sara Martin and Victoria Spivey and her cousin Sippie Wallace. Spivey, inspired by a Mamie Smith performance to become a blues singer, achieved overnight success in 1926, when Okeh released her first recording, her original "Black Snake Blues". In 1929 she appeared in the first all-black talking film.

=== Decline and revival ===
By 1928, the popularity of the classic blues style was waning. With the success of the first commercial recordings of Blind Lemon Jefferson in 1926, a more "down-home", less urbane form of blues became popular, typically performed by men accompanying themselves on guitar or piano. The effect of the Great Depression on black vaudeville and the recording industry, and also the trend toward swing music in the 1930s, ended the careers of most of the classic blues singers. Some, such as Ethel Waters, adapted to changing musical styles; some others, including Lucille Hegamin and Sara Martin, subsequently worked mainly outside the entertainment field; while Hattie McDaniel and Edith Wilson, became successful actors in film and radio. Bessie Smith died in a car crash in 1937, at the age of 41. Lionel Hampton was quoted as saying, "Had she lived, Bessie would've been right up there on top with the rest of us in the Swing Era".

With the downturn in the popularity of female blues singers, beginning about 1933 and 1934, some of these artists began performing and recording what became swing blues. Singers including Lil Johnson and Lucille Bogan started recording for the ARC group of cheaper labels and for Decca Records (after late 1934). Other 1920s female blues singers who later made swing blues records include Victoria Spivey, Ida Cox, and Bertha "Chippie" Hill.

In the 1960s, a revival of interest in the blues brought Sippie Wallace, Alberta Hunter, Edith Wilson and Victoria Spivey back to the concert stage. In 1961, Spivey started her own record label, Spivey Records. In addition to recording herself, she recorded Lucille Hegamin, Memphis Slim, Lonnie Johnson among others.

== Significance ==
The classic female blues singers were pioneers in the record industry, among the first black singers and blues artists recorded. They were also instrumental in popularizing the 12-bar blues throughout the United States. Mahalia Jackson and Janis Joplin are among those who named Bessie Smith as an influence. According to LeRoi Jones, phonograph recordings of the classic blues singers "affected the existing folk tradition and created another kind of tradition that was unlike any other in the past".

Daphne Duval Harrison wrote that the blues women's contributions included "increased improvisation on melodic lines, unusual phrasing which altered the emphasis and impact of the lyrics, and vocal dramatics using shouts, groans, moans, and wails. The blues women thus effected changes in other types of popular singing that had spin-offs in jazz, Broadway musicals, torch songs of the 1930s and 1940s, gospel, rhythm and blues, and eventually rock and roll".

As well as popularizing the 12-bar blues and influencing other types of popular music genres, the women who pioneered classic female blues also addressed issues central to the feminist and social justice movements, bringing personal struggles in women's lives to the public sphere. Bessie Smith and Ma Rainey sang numerous songs about social justice issues, from racism to sexism, incarceration to impoverishment. Smith's song "In the House Blues" highlighted issues of domestic violence.

Other notable classic female blues singers include Virginia Liston and Edmonia Henderson.

== See also ==
- List of classic female blues singers
- Women in music
