= Helen Gross =

American blues singer (1896–1989)

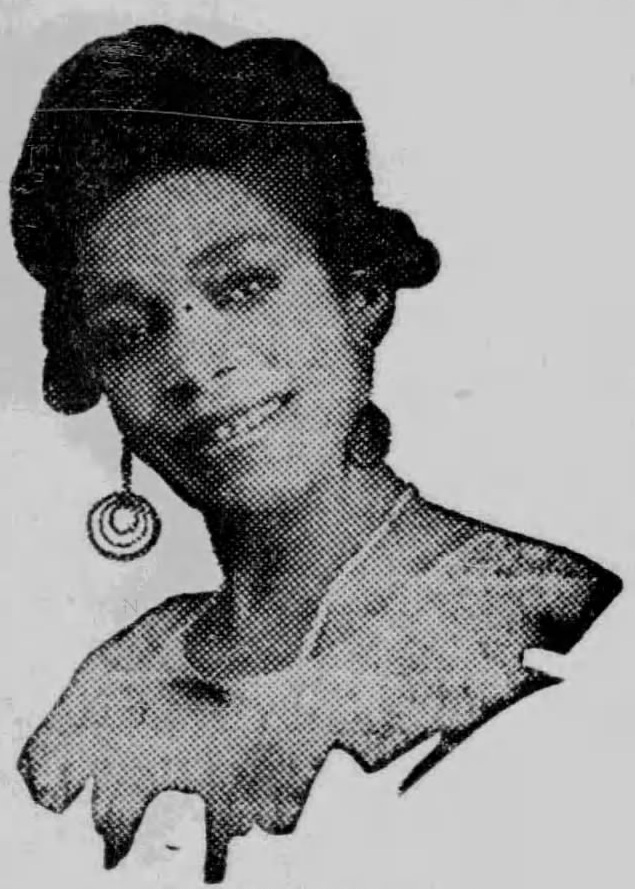
- Gross, in a 1924 Ajax advertisement

Background information
- Born: Helen R. Gross; May 24, 1896; Manhattan, New York, United States
- Died: January 3, 1989 (aged 92) The Bronx, New York, United States
- Genres: Classic female blues
- Occupation: Singer
- Instrument: Vocals
- Years active: 1920s
- Label: Ajax

Helen R. Mitchell (née Gross; May 24, 1896 – January 3, 1989) was an American classic female blues singer, active as a recording artist in the mid-1920s. Songs she recorded include "I Wanna Jazz Some More", "Bloody Razor Blues", and "Strange Man".

All of her recorded work was from sessions in her birthplace, New York City, between May 1924 and March 1925. She recorded 27 songs, which were originally released by Ajax Records. Steve Leggett, writing for AllMusic, noted that her recordings include "a preponderance of often baffling noise effects, which at times gives her songs the feel of a carnival sideshow."

== Early life ==
Helen Gross was born 24 May 1896 in New York City. Gross' parents, Annie Chase and George Gross were born in Maryland. Little else is known of her life outside music.

== Career ==
Gross recorded for Ajax Records, as did Rosa Henderson, Edna Hicks, Viola McCoy, Monette Moore, and Fletcher Henderson. All of her recorded work, 27 songs, was from sessions in her birthplace, New York City, between May 1924 and March 1925.

Her work was notable for the quality of the jazz musicians that accompanied her, including the trumpet and cornet players James "Bubber" Miley and Louis Metcalf, the stride piano player Cliff Jackson, the pianists Lou Hooper and Porter Grainger, and the saxophonist and clarinetist Bob Fuller.

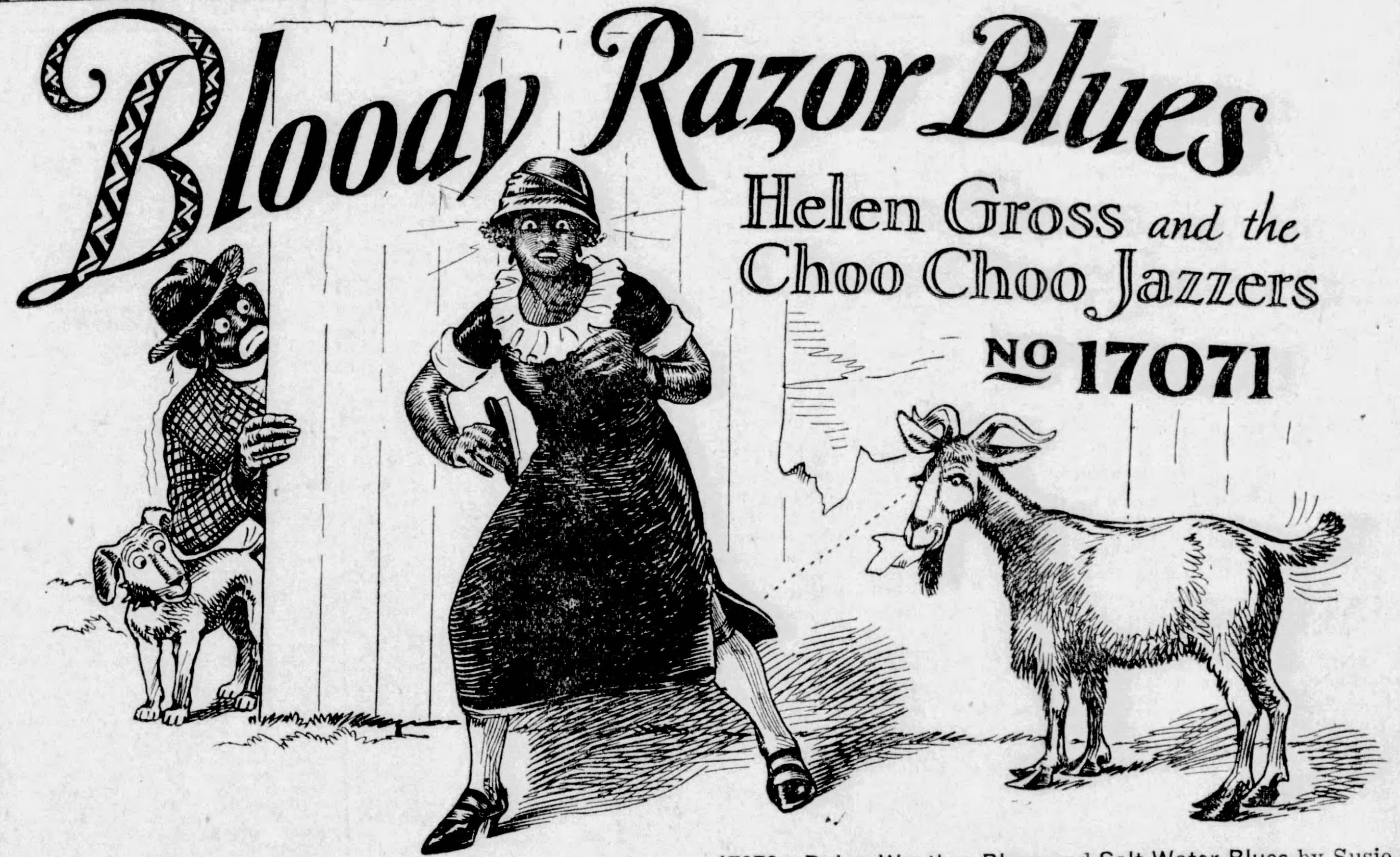
1924 Ajax advertisement for 'Bloody Razor Blues"

Gross was not a conventional blues singer. She approached her work as a vaudeville performer. Her arrangements reinforced this style, giving an unusual approach to standard blues material. The results were sketchy, but the AllMusic critic Steve Leggett noted that, on "Haunted House Blues", "Gross sounds as if she's wandered into a carnival funhouse.... The same technique of using goofy Halloween sound effects makes the similar-sounding "Ghost Walking Blues" work wonderfully, however, with just the right balance between odd and eerie." He wrote of her music that "a preponderance of often baffling noise effects, which at times gives her songs the feel of a carnival sideshow." A more sinister element is evident on "Bloody Razor Blues", with lyrics by Spencer Williams, including "I want to bleed him until his heart runs dry."

Her 1924 rendition of "I Wanna Jazz Some More" became notable because of songwriter Tom Delaney's rhyming line of "Miss Susan Green from New Orleans." Joe Davis worked in an A&R capacity, placing artists and songs with Ajax, including Gross and some of Delaney's work.

== Death ==
Gross died January 3, 1989, aged 92, in The Bronx.

== Discography ==
- Helen Gross: In Chronological Order 1924–25 (1996). Document Records

== See also ==
- List of classic female blues singers
