= Billy Higgins (vaudeville) =

American entertainer and songwriter (1888–1937)

- Also known as: Jazz Caspar
- Born: William Weldon Higgins; June 9, 1888; Columbia, South Carolina, United States
- Died: April 19, 1937 (aged 48) New York City, U.S.
- Genres: Vaudeville, blues
- Occupations: Comedian, singer, songwriter
- Years active: c. 1908–1930s
- Formerly of: Josie Miles; Viola McCoy; Kitty Brown

William Weldon Higgins (June 9, 1888 – April 19, 1937) was an American vaudeville entertainer, comedian, singer and songwriter — critically acclaimed, and is historically chronicled, as one of the most popular stage comedians of the 1920s. Langston Hughes named him as one of the "Golden Dozen" black comedians. On various recordings of the 1920s, Higgins used the pseudonym Jazz Caspar (a.k.a. Casper).

== Biography ==
=== Early years ===
Higgins was born in Columbia, South Carolina. He was African-American and often worked in blackface. He began his career in 1912 as a singer of ballads at private clubs in is hometown of Columbia. Before that, he had been a machinist. Sometime around 1913, he joined Billy King, a widely popular comedian and producer of touring theatrical revues. Higgins co-starred with King in the show Two Bills from Alaska. Higgins performed with King until 1917, when he entered the U.S. Army during World War I.

=== Service in the United States Army ===
During World War I, Higgins was assigned to the 805th Pioneer Infantry, an African-American regiment of 2,810 men comprising 14 companies and a medical detachment. The regiment was nicknamed "Bearcats". Higgins quickly established himself as a performer at Camp Funston's Detention Camp No. 2, where he was first assigned, and where all new recruits were sent to be cleared by Army medics of any communicable viruses or diseases. The Bearcat Entertainers were assigned to Headquarters Company. The 805th Pioneer Infantry was assigned to Europe to support the Meuse-Argonne Offensive, which began September 26, 1918. The organization participated for 39 days — from October 3, 1918, to November 11, 1918 — when the Armistice was signed.

When the Bearcats were deployed to Europe, Higgins was chief entertainer for the 14-day trip — which included a stay at Camp Upton, New York, and a Transatlantic crossing aboard the Saxonia. In Europe, the Bearcats were stationed at Chatel-Chéhéry. Early on, after arriving, they organized a regimental show and entertained guest of the 805th Pioneer Infantry, among whom included the Congressional Committee on Military Affairs, the Staff College of the American Expeditionary Forces, and several other visitors of high rank. Lieutenant Leonce Raoul Legendre (1895–1951), of the Headquarters Company, was in charge of the show and the band that, together, comprised the Bearcat Entertainers. However, Higgins was the de facto stage director. He gained popularity singing songs such as:

- "Shootin' Cross the Rhine"
- "Somewhere Between Here and Yonder"
- "There's a Great Day Coming When You Lay That Gang Plank Down"
- "Bull Frog Hop" (Note: "Bull Frog Hop" (© 1918) Perry Bradford (w&m) © 14 February 1918 E417368 © renewal 10 February 1946)
- "Oh! Doc, Then I'll Go With You"
- "You'll Find Old Dixieland in France" (Note: "You'll Old Find Dixieland In France" (© 1919) (manuscript) George W. Meyer (music) Grant Clarke (words) New York: Leo Feist, Inc. © 2 May 1919 E448838 LCCN 2013-569537 (manuscript))
- "There's Lump of Sugar Down in Dixie" (Note: "There's a Lump of Sugar Down in Dixie" (1918) Alfred Bryan (words) Jack Yellen (words) Albert Gumble (1883–1946) (music) William Austin Starmer (sheet music cover artist) Detroit: J.H. Remick & Co. © 6 March 1918 E418723 OCLC 19956559)
- "And Everything"
- "Somebody's Done Me Wrong" (Note: "Somebody's Done Me Wrong" (© 1816) (coon song) Marshall Walker (words) (1887–1940) Will E. Skidmore (1882–1959) (music) Kansas City: Skidmore Music Co. © 26 December 1916 E393492 © renewed 24 July 1944 R132701 OCLC 7969269)

==== Extant lyrics ====
"Prayer"

Our father which art in Washington
Baker be thy name
May the telegrams fly to Chatel-Chéhéry, as they do at G. H. Q.
Forgive the mess sergeant and the top-kicker
And all those who wear bars and trespass against us
Oh, lead us not into the Army of Occupation
And deliver us from another service stripe
Give us a boat that we may see some blue water
And go to God's country
And live in peace forever and ever
— Eight Men

"Bull Frog Hop"

(chorus)
Commence to wiggle from side to side
Git away back and do the Mobile Glide
Then you do the shimmy with so much spice
Stoop low, hey Bo!
Stew the rice, do the seven-year itch and the possum trot
Then you scratch the gravel in a vacant lot
Slap your hands and then you squat —
That's that bullfrog hop

"You'll Find Old Dixieland in France"

(chorus)
You remember dancing Mose
Folks all called him tickle-toes
You'll find him over there in France
Alexander's band left old Dixie Land
They used to play the lovin' blues for everyone
But now they play the blues upon the gattlin' gun
Don't forget old Shimmy Sam, finest boy from Alabam
He went a- way in kha-ki pants!!!
Instead of pickin' melons off the vine
He's pickin' Germans off the Rhine —
You'll find old Dixie-Land in France

"Shootin' Cross the Rhine"

(chorus)
The first thing you do is when attention's called
Stand up straight, one and all
Forward march, column right — keep your interval —
Then you close up tight
Company halt — 'bout face —
Stand at ease with style and grace
Squad's right and double time —
That's the dance that made the Kaiser
Get back 'cross the Rhine

Higgins rose to the rank of color sergeant. He was not deployed to the combat zones of European theater of World War I. After the Armistice of 11 November 1918 was signed, Higgins mustered out of the Army receiving an honorable discharge July 5, 1919.

=== Post World War I ===
After returning to the US at the end of World War I, Higgins joined the Loew touring circuit, Quintard Gailor Miller's (1895-1979) company, and then the Coleman Brothers' (Note: The C. & V. Amusement Co. was a corporation through which the Coleman Brothers, with their associates, leased and managed the Lafayette Theatre in Harlem. The Coleman Brothers took over the Lafayette around 1921 and dropped the more serious dramatic acts in favor of musical stage shows. The Lafayette was later taken over by Frank Schiffman, who, working with his sons, continued the musical stage show format.) Creole Follies, which opened in 1922 at the Lafayette Theatre in Harlem. Higgins was then recruited by Marcus Levy to take the lead comic role in the 1923 New York show Gold Dust. In 1924, he starred in the revue Cotton Land, with music by James P. Johnson; and in 1929 he appeared in Hot Chocolates, with Louis Armstrong and music by Fats Waller. One of his last shows was The Man From Baltimore in 1934.

== Song writing and recording ==
Higgins also wrote popular songs, including "There'll Be Some Changes Made", "Early in the Morning", and "Georgia Blues", chiefly collaborating with composer Benton Overstreet. In the 1920s, he recorded several duets with female blues singers, namely Josie Miles, Viola McCoy, Kitty Brown, and Alberta Perkins.

The liner notes on a 1996 2-CD compilation of Josie Miles characterized Higgins' lyrics — singing "A to Z Blues" in a duet recorded in 1924 with Miles — as "a violently bizarre, sadistic tour de force of psychological, and economic domination":

"A to Z Blues"
(excerpt)
audio on YouTube

(Higgins)
I'm gonna cut your nappy head four diff'rent ways
Long, short, deep and wide
When I get through usin' my black-handled razor
You know you're gonna take a ride

(Miles)
If you can catch me!

(Higgins)
I'm gonna cut A B C D
In the top of your head
That's gonna be treatin' you nice
And you ain't gonna be dead

(continued ... )

== Family ==
Wives

Around February 1924, Higgins married musician and entertainer Valaida Snow (1904–1956), her second of five marriages. Snow had joined the show Follow Me on tour in 1923 as mistress of ceremonies. Israel M. Weingarden (1869–1928) was the producer; Jerry Mills was the stage director. It was a new production. Other stars in the show included Higgins (principal comedy role), Clifford Ross (born 1879) (supporting comedy role), Julia Moody, Alice Gorgas (1883–1951), and Ernest Whitman. Their marriage ended and on February 19, 1925, Snow married jazz trumpeter and singer Russell T. "Pops" Smith (de) (1891–1966) in Mason City, Iowa.

Higgins married Ida Stern November 24, 1924, in Manhattan, New York.

Death

When Higgins died on April 19, 1937, he had been living at 204 West 119th Street, Manhattan, New York. During the last two years of his life, he had been in poor health and, for that reason, he had been mostly retired from stage-work. An obituary in the New York Age reported that he was married when he died, but separated. He was buried with military honors at the Long Island National Cemetery in Suffolk County, Section G, Site 5004.

Ida Higgins was identified as the wife of Billy Higgins in a filing for a copyright renewal of "There'll Be Some Changes Made" in 1942. Rebecca McCollough, whose relationship to Higgins is not known, also filed for a copyright renewal of "There'll Be Some Changes Made" in 1942.

Daughter

Higgins had a daughter, Mary Ann Booker (born December 6, 1931). Higgins was not married to the mother. The existence of Mary Ann Booker was not widely known by the public until 1960, when Jerry Vogel Music Co., Inc., served notice of an assignment of the copyright renewal rights it had obtained from her in 1958 for $500. This was a surprise, given that, in the late 1940s, Ida Higgins, Henderson, and Overstreet's next-of-kin had assigned their interests in the renewal rights to Edward B. Marks Corporation, which received a copyright renewal certificate on October 12, 1950. The matter became more confusing when, on May 20, 1968, the Supreme Court ruled on a different kind of case that seemingly diminished the standing of an "illegitimate child" as an heir to rights and title under an estate. A court case ensued in 1969 between Vogel (plaintiff) and Marks (defendant) in the U.S. Court of Appeals for the Second Circuit.

== Selected works ==
1. "There'll Be Some Changes Made (1921)
  Billy Wiggins (pseudonym of Billy Higgins) (lyrics)
  William Belton Overstreet (music) (1888–1939)
  New York: Edward B. Marks Music Corp. (Note: Edward B. Marks is currently owned by Carlin America.)
  © 16 September 1921 E519207; © Renewal 20 September 1948 R38135 (Henderson arr.) (Note: Vol. 2, Part 14B, January–June 1948, No. 1 (1949), pg. 171)
  © 16 September 1921 E519207; © Renewal 17 September 1948 R38310 (Henderson arr.)
  © 16 December 1924 E603539; (Note: Vol. 19, Part 2, July–December 1924, Nos. 3–4 (1924), pg. 1299) © Renewal 10 December 1951 R87328 (Wheeler arr.)
  5 additional choruses by Wilson & Ringle (Note: David Townsend Ringle (1894–1965).)
  © 20 November 1924 E601555; (Note: Vol. 19, Part 2, July–December 1924, Nos. 3–4 (1924), pg. 1299) © Renewal 10 December 1951 R87327 (Wilson & Ringle arrangement)
  © 20 November 1924 E601555; © Renewal 20 November 1951 R86297 (Wilson & Ringle arrangement) (Note: Vol. 5, Part 5C, January–June 1951, No. 1 (1952), pg. 159)
  OCLC 20410673
2. "Next Man That Falls For Me, I'm Gonna Let Him Lay"
  Billy Weldon Higgins (words & music)
  © 1st copy 19 September 1924 E597569 (Note: Vol. 19, Part 2, July–December 1924, Nos. 3–4 (1924), pg. 1003)
  New York: Clarence Williams Music Pub. Co., Inc.
3. "Early in the Morning"
  Billy Wiggins (lyrics)
  William Belton Overstreet (music) (1888–1939)
4. "Come Back To Me, Daddy, Momma Ain't Satisfied Blues"
  Billy Weldon Higgins (words & music)
  © 6 February 1924 E581296
  © 1st copy 1 July 1924 E589658 (Note: Vol. 19, Part 2, July–December 1924, Nos. 3–4 (1924), pg. 665)
  New York: Clarence Williams Music Pub. Co., Inc.

== Selected discography ==
1. Alberta Perkins & Jazz Casper (vocal duet)
  With Bubber Miley (coronet), Louis Hooper (piano), Elmer Snowden (banjo), possibly Joe Davis (chimes on the first song)
  Recorded in New York City, circa October 30, 1924
  "Who Calls You Sweet Mama Now?"
  Matrix: 5695-1, 2, 3
  Banner 1467
  "Sween Mandy"
  Matrix: 5696-1, 2
  Banner 1451
  Note: Perkins is credited as Louella Jones, Lucille Johnson, Nettie Potter, and Dixey Gray on other releases
2. Josie Miles & Billy Higgins (vocal duet)
  With the Choo Choo Jazzers; accompanied by Bubber Miley (coronet), Bob Fuller (clarinet on the first song), Louis Hooper (piano)
  Recorded in New York City, circa November 1924
  "I'm Done Done Done With You"
  Matrix 31725
  Ajax 17080
  "A to Z Blues" (Bob Fuller out)
  Matrix 31727
3. Josie Miles
  "It's The Last Time I'll Be a Pastime For You"
  Recorded in New York City, January 26, 1925
  Josie Miles (vocal), (unknown; alto sax), Bob Fuller (tenor sax), Louis Hooper (piano), Jazz Caspar (vocal)
  audio on YouTube
  Matrix 5829
  Domino 3469
  OCLC 4964422630

== Filmography ==
- Father Said He'd Fix It (1915)

== Pseudonyms ==
- Billy Wiggins (1921) (see 1948 copyright renewal)
- Jazz Casper (a.k.a. Caspar) (notably as vocal accompanist on recordings with Kitty Brown, Alberta Perkins, Josie Miles

Note: Some biographical references, notably, the searchable BMI Song Database, incorrectly identify Higgins of this article as William Blackstone. "Blackstone" is the maiden name of the mother of another Billy Higgins (1936–2001) — the late jazz drummer who has no apparent direct relationship to the Higgins of this article. The mother's full maiden name was Anna Bell Marie Blackstone (1903–2001). She was married to Samuel Higgins (1901–1970).
