= Cliff Jackson (musician) =

American stride pianist (1902–1970)

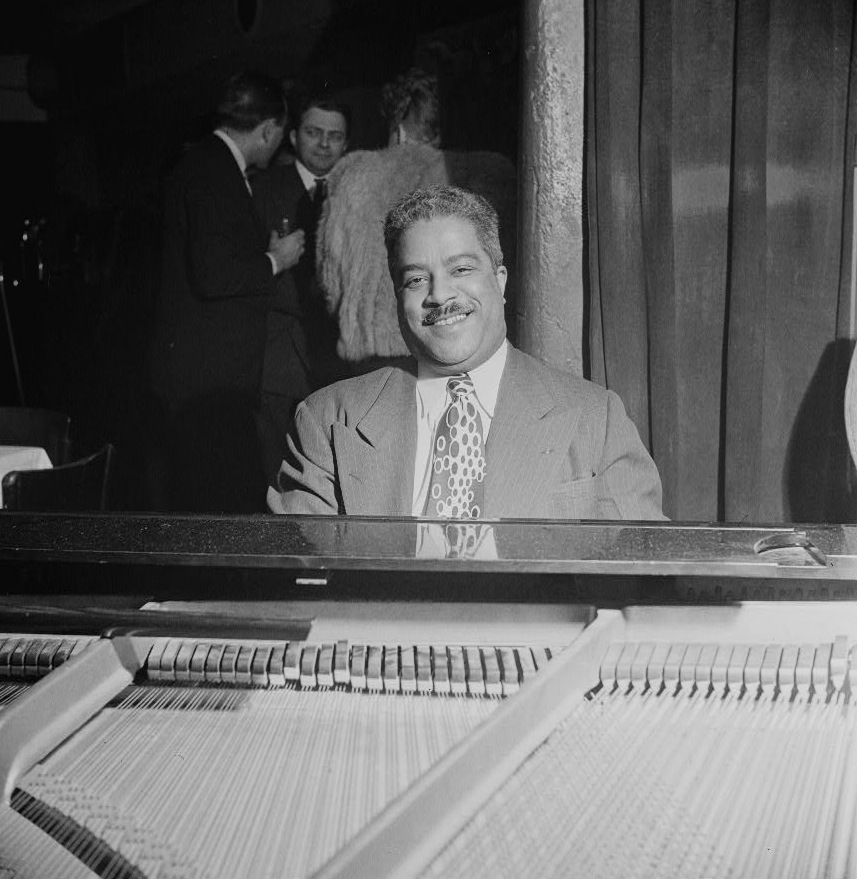
- Jackson at the piano in 1947; photo by William P. Gottlieb

Background information
- Born: Clifton Luther Jackson; July 19, 1902; Washington, D.C., U.S.
- Died: May 24, 1970 (aged 67) New York City, U.S.
- Genres: Stride; jazz
- Occupation: Musician
- Instrument: Piano
- Years active: 1920s–1960s
- Spouse: Maxine Sullivan (m. 1950–1970)

Clifton Luther Jackson (July 19, 1902 – May 24, 1970) was an American stride pianist.

== Career ==
Jackson was born in Washington, D.C., United States. After playing in Atlantic City, Jackson moved to New York City in 1923, where he played with Lionel Howard's Musical Aces in 1924 and recorded with Bob Fuller and Elmer Snowden. He led his own ensemble, the Krazy Kats, for recordings in 1930, and following this group's dissolution, he played extensively as a solo pianist in nightclubs in New York. During this time, he also accompanied singers such as Viola McCoy, Lena Wilson, Sara Martin, Martha Copeland, Helen Gross, and Clara Smith. He recorded with Sidney Bechet in 1940–41 and recorded as a soloist or leader in 1944–45, 1961, and 1969. As the house pianist at Café Society from 1943 until 1951, he was a success; he also toured with Eddie Condon in 1946. Other musicians he played with included Garvin Bushell (1950), J. C. Higginbotham (1960), and Joe Thomas (1962).

== Musical style ==
As heard on many of his 1944–1945 solo piano recordings, such as "Limehouse Blues", Jackson was one of the most powerful stride piano players. His style was also marked by a contrapuntal-like bass work. His many left hand techniques are found explained in detail in Riccardo Scivales's method book, Jazz Piano: The Left Hand (Bedford Hills, New York: Ekay Music, 2005, ISBN 978-1929009657).

== Personal life ==
Jackson was married to jazz singer Maxine Sullivan from 1950 until his death from heart failure in 1970.

== Discography ==
=== As leader ===
- 1926–34: Recorded in New York 1926–34 (Jazz Oracle, 2003)
- 1930: Cliff Jackson and His Crazy Kats 1930 (Retrieval, 1981)
- 1930–45: The Chronological (Classics)
- 1961.07: Uptown and Lowdown (Prestige, 1961) – Jackson was only on the last four tracks; the rest of LP was performed by Dick Wellstood
- 1961–62: Carolina Shout! (Black Lion, 1973) – piano solos
- 1965: Hot Piano (R1 Disc)
- 1966: Manassas Jazz Festival (Jazzology)
- 1968: Parlor social piano (Fat Cat's Jazz)
- 1969: Master Jazz Piano Vol. 1 (Master Jazz)

=== As sideman ===
- Sidney Bechet, Bechet of New Orleans (RCA Victor, 1965)
- Bunny Berigan, Chronological 1935–1936 (Classics, 1993)
- Eddie Condon, The Eddie Condon Concerts (Chiaroscuro, 1972)
- Eddie Condon, The Town Hall Concerts Vol. Four (Jazzology, 1989)
- The Delfonics, La La Means I Love You (Philly Groove, 1968)
- Helen Gross, 1924–1925 (Document, 1988)
- Coleman Hawkins, Years Ago (Prestige, 1964)
- Rosa Henderson, Complete Recorded Works in Chronological Order Vol. 4 (Document, 1995)
- Alberta Hunter, Lucille Hegamin, and Victoria Spivey; Songs We Taught Your Mother (Prestige, 1962)
- Lonnie Johnson, Idle Hours (Prestige, 1987)
- Jimmy Rushing, The Jazz Odyssey of Jimmy Rushing (Philips, 1957)
- Al Sears, Things Ain't What They Used to Be (Swingville, 1961)
- Elmer Snowden, Harlem Banjo (Riverside, 1960)
