= Bob Ricketts =

American songwriter and musician (1885–1936)

- Birth name: Robert Williams Ricketts
- Born: March 15, 1885 Springfield, Ohio, U.S.
- Died: November 25, 1936 (aged 51) New York City, U.S.
- Occupations: Musician; composer; lyricist; bandleader; song arranger; music publisher

Robert Williams Ricketts (March 15, 1885 – November 25, 1936) was an American musician, composer, lyricist, bandleader, song arranger and music publisher. Bob Ricketts was associated with fellow musician and songwriter Porter Grainger and together they produced a number of musical works.

== Career ==
Ricketts was living in Philadelphia, Pennsylvania in 1918, where he led the pit band at the Standard Theater in South Philadelphia. Upon his arrival in New York City, he had joined forces with Porter Grainger; together they wrote a number of songs and embarked on a number of endeavors including establishing a publishing house called the Rainbow Music Company; their chief financial backer was the composer Irving Berlin

In 1924, the Pittsburgh Courier reported that Ricketts and Grainger wrote "twenty-two musical numbers" for a show called Honey, with the book by noted vaudevillians Flournoy E. Miller and Aubrey Lyles.

In 1922, Ricketts led a ten-piece orchestra for the show Dumb Luck (featuring Ethel Waters) that toured New England, starting in Stamford, Connecticut; but two weeks later, the cast of a hundred was stranded in Worcester, Massachusetts. Bernard Peterson reports that "the troupe was finally rescued by the producers of Shuffle Along through the efforts of Noble Sissle and his wife, who raised $700 to enable the cast to return to New York."

In 1923, "Bob Rickett's Band", consisting of Ricketts on piano, Buddy Christian or Elmer Snowden on banjo, Ernest Elliot on clarinet, Tom Morris, cornet, Charlie Irvis on trombone and Bob Fuller on alto saxophone accompanied blues singer Viola McCoy on a number of recordings. Ricketts, fronting "Rickett's Stars" also appeared on the recordings of blues singers Gladys Bryant, Esther Bigeou and Kitty Brown.

Ricketts was also known as a song arranger; among some of the compositions he worked on included works by Jimmy Durante, J. Tim Brymn and Chris Smith. Ricketts also provided arrangements for band headed by Fletcher Henderson, among others.

In 1926, Ricketts and Grainger wrote and published the pamphlet How to Play and Sing the Blues Like the Phonograph and Stage Artists. They described the pamphlet as "An Original, Comprehensive Treatise That Thoroughly Explains and Illustrates Various Popular Types of BLUES such as 'WEARY BLUES', 'JAZZ BLUES', 'NEGRO SPIRITUALS,' 'LULLABIES' and Numerous 'BREAKS' for Piano." Grainger and Ricketts provided the interested reader with "A Series of Practical and Valuable Instructions That Will Enable The Lover of BLUES and SPIRITUALS to Play and Sing Them Better; A Simple Yet Thorough Short Course to BLUES Mastery". The pamphlet is full of helpful information and advice for the aspiring singer, including "It is possible to properly produce 'Blues' effects on any instrument, although the wailings, moanings, and croonings...are more easily produced on instruments like the saxophone, trombone, or violin. Without the necessary moan, croon, or slur... no blues number is properly sung."

In March 1929, Grainger and Ricketts were contracted by Columbia Pictures to write the script and the musical score for a motion picture entitled Jailhouse Blues, a musical short film starring Mamie Smith.

== Notable songs ==
All songs were written in collaboration with Porter Grainger unless otherwise noted.

- "Honey (1924)
- "No One Ever Let Me In on Nothin'" (1923)
- "Hula" (1924)
- "Four-Flushing Papa" (1924)
- "I've Opened My Heart" (1923)
- "Triflin' Blues" (1923)
- "Laughin', Cryin' Blues" (1923)
- "I'm Every Man's Mama" (1924)
- "Tired Of Waitin' Blues" (1924) (recorded by Viola McCoy)
- "Papa Don't Ask Mama Where She Was ('Cause She Don't Want To Lie To You)" (1924)
- "Mistreatin' Daddy" (1923) (recorded by Bessie Smith and Mamie Smith)
- "Louisville Blues" (1925) (with Mike Jackson)
- "Ramblin' Until I Find My Lovin' Man" (1924) (with Spencer Williams)
- "I'm Gonna Get You" (1923) (recorded by Mamie Smith)
- "Charleston Crazy" (1925) (recorded by Fletcher Henderson and His Orchestra)
- "If You Want To Keep Your Daddy Home" (1923) (with Porter Grainger and Ernest Paisley)
- "My Mammy's Blues" (1923) (recorded by Mamie Smith)
- "I Don't Love Nobody" (1923) (recorded by Clara Smith)
