= Shake That Thing =

1925 blues song by Papa Charlie Jackson

Single by Papa Charlie Jackson
- A-side: "The Faking Blues"
- Released: July 11, 1925
- Recorded: May 1925
- Genre: Blues
- Label: Paramount
- Songwriter: Papa Charlie Jackson

Audio
- Recording of Shake That Thing, performed by Papa Charlie Jackson (1925): file; help

"Shake That Thing" is a song recorded by Papa Charlie Jackson in 1925, one of the earliest blues standards and a forerunner of hokum. Paramount Records issued it on the B-side of the then standard 10-inch 78 rpm shellac record on July 11, 1925. The song is also known as a first hit record where the male singer accompanies himself. The title of the song (oft-repeated in the lyrics) contains double entendre: at the time "shake it" was a vulgar euphemism for coitus (on the innocent side, it was quite likely a directive for female dancers to shake their hips, the author Stephen Calt thinks that the expression became indecent as a result of the success of the song).

== Song ==
The song is written in a twelve-bar verse-and-refrain format with two-line, four-bar verse and three-line, eight-bar chorus (song is similar to Jackson's earlier eight-bar "Salty Dog Blues" recorded in September 1924). Like the other best Jackson's songs, "Shake That Thing" is an uptempo dance blues.

The lyrics tells the story of Jackson visiting Georgia where young and old participate in a new kind of dance that requires dancers to "shake that thing" (the dance that supposedly goes to fast syncopated music, appears to be fictional). Jackson plays a novel stop-time solo on his banjo (or banjo guitar, the record states, "Guitar acc"). and sings:

Now down in Georgia they got a dance that's new

There ain't nothing to it, it's easy to do
They call it shake that thing,
Aww, shake that thing

I'm getting sick 'n' tired of telling you to shake that thing

On its own the lyrics is pretty tame, but it was made salacious by Jackson's "leering delivery".

== Release ==
Jackson was recording with Paramount since 1924.

In 1926 the publishing rights were sold to Shapiro and Bernstein with a piano version printed in the same year.

== Recognition ==
The song is the most influential piece by Jackson (he also "struck pay dirt") and arguably also the most influential in the history of race records. J. Mayo Williams stated that "Shake That Thing" was so hot that it "helped put the roar in the roaring ’20s". In less than a year it was covered by Clarence Williams's Blue Five, Ethel Waters, Billy Wirges and his Orchestra, Viola McCoy, Viola Bartlette and Jimmie O’Bryant's Famous Original Washboard Band, Abe Lyman and his Californians, even Louis Armstrong and his Hot Five joined with a music arrangement by Spencer Williams under the name "Georgia Grind" that included a bit of additional lyrics. The Paramount record by Jackson was referred to as an "original" early in 1926, a rarity for the times.

== Later developments ==
The music was reworked in 1928 by Georgia Tom (Thomas A. Dorsey) for his (and Tampa Red's) song "It's Tight Like That" that started a new subgenre that was later named hokum blues.

The lyrics triggered a brief copyright controversy: in 1926 Carl Van Vechten copied it verbatim into his "Nigger Heaven"; to avoid a lawsuit Langston Hughes, a student at the time, was commissioned to write alternative lines that would exactly fit into the already-made printing plates (just in case, Hughes also wrote substitute lyrics for all other poetry pieces in the novel). This is a rare case of a poet guided by the typesetting rules.

== Discography ==
Records related to "Shake That Thing"
Title	Artist	Label/catalog #	Year
"Shake That Thing"	Papa Charlie Jackson	Paramount 12281	1925
"Shake That Thing"	Clarence Williams's Blue Five	OKeh 8267	1925
"Shake That Thing"	Ethel Waters	Columbia 14116D	1925
"Shake That Thing"	Billy Wirges and his Orchestra	Perfect 14533, Pathé 36352	1925
"Shake That Thing"	Viola McCoy	Vocalion 15245	1926
"Shake That Thing"	Viola Bartlette	Paramount 12345	1926
"Shake That Thing"	Jimmy O'Bryant's Famous Washboard Band	Paramount 12346A	1926
"Shake That Thing"	Abe Lyman and his Californians	Brunswick 3069	1926
"Georgia Grind"	Louis Armstrong and his Hot Five	OKeh 8318	1926

== Sources ==
- Schwartz, Roberta Freund (2018-10-01). "How Blue Can You Get? "It's Tight Like That" and the Hokum Blues". American Music. 36 (3). University of Illinois Press: 367–393. doi:10.5406/americanmusic.36.3.0367. ISSN 0734-4392.
- Johnson, G. B. (1927). "Double meaning in the popular negro blues". The Journal of Abnormal and Social Psychology. 22 (1). American Psychological Association (APA): 12–20. doi:10.1037/h0075493. ISSN 0096-851X.
- Komara, Edward (Spring 2015). ""Papa" Charlie Jackson, and Cary Moskovitz et al. Papa Charlie Done Sung That Song: Celebrating The Music Of "Papa" Charlie Jackson". ARSC Journal. 46 (1). Annapolis: 172–175, 189.
- Birnbaum, L. (2012). Before Elvis: The Prehistory of Rock 'n' Roll. Scarecrow Press. ISBN 978-0-8108-8629-2.
- Birnbaum, L. (2013). Before Elvis: The Prehistory of Rock 'n' Roll. G - Reference, Information and Interdisciplinary Subjects Series. Scarecrow Press. ISBN 978-0-8108-8638-4.
- Wald, E. (2010). The Blues: A Very Short Introduction. Very Short Introductions. Oxford University Press. ISBN 978-0-19-975079-5.
- Trotman, C.J., ed. (2014). "Langston Hughes's Nigger Heaven Blues". Langston Hughes: The Man, His Art, and His Continuing Influence. Critical Studies in Black Life and Culture. Taylor & Francis. ISBN 978-1-317-94617-5.
- Calt, S. (2010). "shake that thing". Barrelhouse Words: A Blues Dialect Dictionary. University of Illinois Press. ISBN 978-0-252-09071-4.
- Dodge, T. (2019). Rhythm and Blues Goes Calypso. Lexington Books. ISBN 978-1-4985-3099-6.
- Obrecht, J. (2015). Early Blues: The First Stars of Blues Guitar. University of Minnesota Press. ISBN 978-1-4529-4565-1.
- Hansen, B. (2000). Rhino's Cruise Through the Blues. G - Reference, Information and Interdisciplinary Subjects Series. Miller Freeman Books. ISBN 978-0-87930-625-0.
- Dixon, R.M.W.; Godrich, J.; Rye, H. (1997). Blues & Gospel Records, 1890-1943. Clarendon Press. ISBN 978-0-19-816239-1.
