= Pete Wendling =

American composer

Pete Wendling (June 6, 1888 – April 7, 1974) was an American composer and pianist, born in New York City to German immigrants. He often collaborated with fellow QRS pianist and composer, Max Kortlander.

He started his working life as a carpenter, but gained fame during the mid-1910s as a popular music composer, with his name appearing on the "Soup and Fish Rag" in 1913. He worked on such hits as "Yaaka Hula Hickey Dula" (recorded by Al Jolson), "Take Me To The Land Of Jazz", "Take Your Girlie To The Movies", "Felix The Cat", and "Oh What A Pal Is Mary".

Wendling was also one of the top pianists of his era, and set a long-standing record when he appeared at the London Hippodrome for eight consecutive weeks. He joined the Rhythmodik Music Roll Company in 1914, and started to record his performances on paper rolls for player pianos. In 1916 he recorded for American Piano Company (Ampico). In 1918, he joined the largest piano roll company, QRS, and rapidly became one of their most popular artists, his distinctive yet always fresh performances constantly topping their best-selling lists.

He recorded two sides for Okeh Records in 1923, and in 1926, cut another four for Cameo. In 1927, QRS, tightening their belt due to declining sales, released Wendling, and he concentrated on his composing career until his retirement in the 1950s. In 1955, he co-wrote "I Wonder", which became a UK chart hit for both Jane Froman and Dickie Valentine. Wendling's last notable work was "Rich in Love" in 1956.

Married to Anna, he had no children. A resident of Manhattan, he died in New York City in April 1974, aged 85 after several strokes.

== Selected Discography ==
- Al Jolson- Yaaka Hula Hickey Dula (1916), Columbia
- Henry Burr- Oh How I Wish I Could Sleep (Until My Daddy Comes Home) (1918), Victor
- Marion Harris- Take Me to the Land of Jazz (1919), Victor
- Henry Burr- Oh, What a Pal Was Mary (1919), Victor
- Irving Kaufman- Take Your Girlie to the Movies (When You Can't Make Love at Home) (1919), OKeh
- Al Jolson- In Sweet September (1920), Columbia (as lyricist)
- Billy Murray & Aileen Stanley- Whenever You're Lonesome (Just Telephone Me) (1922), Victor
- Johnny Marvin & Aileen Stanley- Red Lips (Kiss My Blues Away) (1927), Victor
- Paul Whiteman Orchestra- Felix the Cat (1928), Columbia
- Paul Specht Orchestra- (That's What I Call) Sweet Music (1929), Columbia
- Seger Ellis- There's Danger In Your Eyes, Chérie (1930), OKeh
