= Edmonia Henderson =

African American classic female blues singer

- Also known as: Catherine Henderson; The Melodious Blues Singer
- Born: Jennie Katherine Edmonia Henderson or; Edmonia Kath Landen; December 25, 1898 or 1900; Henderson, Tennessee or Jefferson County, Kentucky, U.S.
- Died: February 17, 1947 (age 46–48) Louisville, Kentucky, U.S.
- Genres: Classic female blues
- Occupations: Singer (contralto); evangelist
- Instrument: Vocals
- Years active: 1920s
- Labels: Vocalion; Okeh; Paramount

Edmonia Henderson (December 25, 1898 or 1900 – February 17, 1947) was an American classic female blues singer. She was active as a recording artist in the mid-1920s, recording at least 14 songs between 1924 and 1926. She later became an evangelist.

At various times, Henderson sang accompanied by Jelly Roll Morton, Tommy Ladnier, Lovie Austin, Eddie Heywood, and Johnny Dodds.

== Career ==
Some sources state that she was born Jennie Katherine Edmonia Henderson, in Jefferson County, Kentucky (present-day Louisville), in 1900. However, the researchers Bob Eagle and Eric LeBlanc state that she was born Edmonia Kath Landen in Tennessee on December 25, 1898.

Henderson appeared in vaudeville, both as a solo artist and as part of Joe Clark's Revue, performing on the Theater Owners Booking Association circuit, including appearances in Baltimore, Chicago, and Nashville. In 1925, she performed in Radio Girls, another vaudeville revue, which included Bessie Williams, Mamie Jefferson, and Baby Badge.

Henderson's first recording was made in 1924. She recorded "Dead Man Blues" in 1926, with accompaniment by the writer of the song, Jelly Roll Morton, on piano. In 1927, a record of hers was released in the United Kingdom by the British record label Oriole, as part of its Race Series, under licence from Vocalion. The series also included recordings by Rosa Henderson and Viola McCoy.

By 1928, she was teaching and giving gospel concerts at the Griffith Conservatory of Music in Louisville. In 1932, she married and became the Reverend Edmonia Buckner.

Her work has appeared on various compilation albums, including The Rise and Fall of Paramount Records 1917–1927, Volume 1 (2013).

She is unrelated to Fletcher, Horace, Katherine, or Rosa Henderson.

Henderson died on February 17, 1947, in Louisville and was interred in Louisville Cemetery.

== Selected discography ==
Year	A-side (Songwriter)	B-side (Songwriter)	Notes
1924	"Jelly Roll Blues" (Jelly Roll Morton)	"Lazy Daddy Blues" (Jay Guy Suddoth)	Accompanied by Tommy Ladnier, Lovie Austin, Johnny Dodds
1924	"Black Man Blues" (Lovie Austin)	"Worried 'Bout Him Blues" (Robert Warfield)	
1924	"Brown Skin Man" (Boots Hope)	"Traveling Blues" (Pearl White)	
1924	"Hateful Blues" (Perry Bradford, E. Johnson)	"Mama Don't Want Sweet Man Anymore" (Alex Blythe)	
1925	"Four-Thirty Blues" (Edmonina Henderson)	"Sweet De Papa Blues" (Edmonina Henderson)	As Catherine Henderson, accompanied by Eddie Heywood
1926	"Nobody Else Will Do" (Lovie Austin)	"Who's Gonna Do Your Lovin' (When Your Good Man's Gone Away)" (Lovie Austin)	
1926	"Georgia Grind" (Spencer Williams)	"Dead Man Blues" (Jelly Roll Morton)	Recorded in Chicago, July 21, 1926

== See also ==
- List of classic female blues singers
