= Robert Ricketts =

Robert Ricketts may refer to:

- Bob Ricketts (Robert Williams Ricketts, 1885–1936), American musician, composer, lyricist, bandleader, song arranger, and music publisher
- Robert Bruce Ricketts (1839–1918), artillery officer in the American Civil War
- Robert M. Ricketts (1920–2003), American orthodontist
