= Bertha Idaho =

American blues singer

- Also known as: Bertha Jordan
- Born: c. 1895; Georgia, United States
- Died: Unknown
- Genres: Classic female blues
- Occupation: Singer
- Instrument: Vocals
- Years active: 1920s
- Label: Columbia

Bertha Idaho (born c. 1895; date of death unknown) was an American classic female blues singer. She recorded four songs in 1928 and 1929. Little is known of her life outside music.

Idaho's work might have remained obscure but for two factors: she was mentioned by John Fahey in the liner notes for his influential debut album, Blind Joe Death, and her recordings were reissued by Rosetta Reitz.

== Career ==
Idaho may have been born in Georgia about 1895. Her singing career commenced in the 1910s, in a traveling song and dance act with her husband, John. In 1915, they appeared with the Florida Blossom Minstrels and, in Milledgeville, Georgia, performed "Jelly Roll" and "Brother Low Down".

She recorded four songs: "Graveyard Love" and "You've Got the Right Eye, but You're Peeping at the Wrong Keyhole" on May 2, 1928, and "Down on Pennsylvania Avenue" and "Move It On Out of Here" on May 25, 1929, all of which were recorded in New York City.

Tom Delaney wrote "Down on Pennsylvania Avenue", with lyrics referring to his own bad luck: "Now if you want good lovin' and want it cheap, just drop around about the middle of the week, when the broad is broke and can't pay rent, get good lovin' boys, for 15 cents." There is some dispute about whether the piano accompaniment on Idaho's recordings was by Delaney or by Clarence Williams. The labels on the records state that three of the songs were composed by Delaney; Idaho is credited as the writer of "You've Got the Right Eye, but You're Peeping at the Wrong Keyhole".

Her stage career was contemporary with her recordings. In 1928, she starred in Mississippi Steppers, a touring review in the vaudeville style, and the following year in Georgia Peaches, which she co-produced. By 1930, she was known as Bertha Jordan and was based in Baltimore, Maryland. No details of her death have been recorded.

== Legacy ==
Fahey's album Blind Joe Death was originally released by Takoma Records in 1959, in a pressing of fewer than one hundred copies. Fahey mentioned Idaho in the liner notes for the album, which gained significance with later reissues.

Reitz's music collections were built on old 78-rpm records of lesser-known performers, including Idaho, Valaida Snow, Georgia White, Bessie Brown, and Maggie Jones, and long-forgotten songs from better-known artists, such as Ida Cox, Ma Rainey, Bessie Smith and Mae West. Reitz's collection particularly featured classic female blues singers of the 1920s. She reissued early recordings on her own label, Rosetta Records.

== Compilation discography ==
- Mean Mothers/Independent Women's Blues, Vol. 1 (1981), Rosetta Records ("Move It On Out of Here")
- Independent Women's Blues, Vol. 3: Super Sisters: 1927–1955 (1995), Rosetta ("You've Got the Right Eye, But You're Peeping at the Wrong Keyhole")
- Female Blues Singers, Vol. 10: H/I/J (1923–1929) (1997), Document Records (all four of her recorded songs)
- ...I Listen to the Wind That Obliterates My Traces (2011), Dust-to-Digital ("Graveyard Love")

== See also ==
- List of classic female blues singers
