= Tom Delaney (songwriter) =

American singer

- Born: Thomas Henry Delaney; September 14, 1889; Charleston, South Carolina, United States
- Died: December 16, 1963 (aged 74) Baltimore, Maryland, United States
- Genres: Blues, jazz
- Occupations: Songwriter, pianist, singer
- Years active: 1920s–1930s

Thomas Henry Delaney (September 14, 1889 – December 16, 1963) was an American blues and jazz songwriter, pianist and singer, who wrote a number of popular songs, mainly in the 1920s. His work was recorded by many of the more fashionable singers and musicians of the period and later times, including Lillyn Brown, Lucille Hegamin, Original Dixieland Jass Band, Ethel Waters, Earl Hines, Count Basie, Bix Beiderbecke, Big Joe Williams, Clara Smith, Alberta Hunter, Clarence Williams, James P. Johnson, Woody Herman, Bukka White, Toots Thielemans, and Dinah Washington.

Delaney was known primarily as a songwriter for other performers, but he also recorded a small number of his own songs.

== Biography ==
He was born in Charleston, South Carolina. He spent his childhood in orphanages, including the Jenkins Orphanage in Charleston, where he got his first experience of music and formed the Springfield Minstrels. He later toured the East Coast in a song and dance duo billed as Mitchell and Delaney.

One of Delaney's earliest compositions, "Jazz Me Blues", published in 1921, became one of his more durable works. Lucille Hegamin recorded it that year and it went on to become a jazz standard. In the same year, "The Down Home Blues", recorded by Ethel Waters with Delaney accompanying on the piano, became her first hit. It reached number 5 on the U.S. chart. Delaney also became Waters's manager.

His 1923 composition "Sinful Blues" was one of several of Delaney's that became under the influence of the record producer and publicist Joe Davis. Consequently, many subsequent recordings list Perry Bradford as the songwriter, although Delaney did remain the accredited composer for Maggie Jones's "If I Lose, Let Me Lose (Mamma Don't Mind)" and Clara Smith's "Troublesome Blues" (1927). Helen Gross's 1924 rendition of Delaney's "I Wanna Jazz Some More" became more notable for his rhyming lyric "Miss Susan Green from New Orleans." A number of Delaney's songs were not published at all, such as "Goopher Dust Blues" (with the deliberate or unintended error in spelling) and "Grievin' Mama." His "All the Girls Like Big Dick" was too risque a title for release in the 1920s, despite a loosening of morals in that period, but was published by Davis in the 1950s.

In 1929, Delaney composed "Down on Pennsylvania Avenue", with the lyrics "Now if you want good lovin' and want it cheap, just drop around about the middle of the week, when the broad is broke and can't pay rent, get good lovin' boys, for 15 cents." It was one of only four songs recorded by Bertha Idaho. There is some confusion about whether Delaney or Clarence Williams provided the piano accompaniment on Idaho's recordings.

Delaney's own recorded work amounts to two singles, both recorded in New York and released by Columbia Records in 1922: "Bow Legged Mama" backed with "Parson Jones (You Ain't Livin' Right)" and "I'm Leavin' Just to Ease My Worried Mind" backed with "Georgia Stockade Blues".

Delaney's version of his song "Georgia Stockade Blues" is included on the 1999 compilation album Broke, Black and Blue: An Anthology of Blues Classics and Rarities.

== Death ==
Delaney died of atherosclerosis in December 1963, at the age of 74, in Baltimore, Maryland.

== Selected songs ==
Date	Song title	Songwriter	Recorded by
1921	"Jazz Me Blues"	Tom Delaney	Lillyn Brown, Lucille Hegamin, ODJB, Art Pepper, Bert Lown, Earl Hines, Woody Herman, Claude Bolling, Charlie Shavers, Count Basie, Toots Thielemans, Bix Biederbecke, Rex Stewart, Roy Eldridge, Pete Fountain, Boris Vian, John Serry, Sr., Tony Mottola
1921	"The Down Home Blues"	Tom Delaney	Ethel Waters, James P. Johnson, Eubie Blake
1923	"Log Cabin Blues"	Tom Delaney	Trixie Smith, Blind Boy Fuller, Clarence Williams
1923	"Sinful Blues"	Tom Delaney (often credited to Perry Bradford)	Bessie Smith
1924	"I Wanna Jazz Some More"	Tom Delaney	Helen Gross
1924	"Alabama Blues"	Tom Delaney, Bukka White	Bukka White
1924	"Absent Minded Blues"	Tom Delaney	Margaret Johnson
1924	"Southbound Blues"	Tom Delaney, Ma Rainey	Ma Rainey
1925	"Nobody Knows the Way I Feel This Mornin'"	Pearl Delaney, Tom Delaney	Clara Smith, Margaret Johnson, David Bromberg, Sidney Bechet, Aretha Franklin, Big Joe Williams, Dinah Washington, Alberta Hunter
1925	"Follow the Deal on Down"	Tom Delaney	Bessie Smith
1925	"If I Lose, Let Me Lose (Mamma Don't Mind)"	Tom Delaney	Maggie Jones
1925	"You May Go but You'll Come Back Some Day"	Tom Delaney	Maggie Jones
1925	"I'm a Back Bitin' Mama"	Tom Delaney	Maggie Jones
1925	"Never Drive a Beggar from Your Door"	Tom Delaney	Maggie Jones
1927	"Police Blues"	Tom Delaney	Martha Copeland
1927	"Troublesome Blues"	Tom Delaney	Clara Smith
1928	"Graveyard Love"	Tom Delaney	Bertha Idaho
1928	"Walk That Broad"	Tom Delaney, Warren Frisino	Clarence Williams
1928	"Somethin' Goin' On Wrong"	Tom Delaney, James P. Johnson	Martha Copeland
1928	"Slow and Steady"	Tom Delaney, King Oliver	King Oliver
1929	"Move It On Out of Here"	Tom Delaney	Bertha Idaho
1929	"Down on Pennsylvania Avenue"	Tom Delaney	Bertha Idaho
1934	"Jazz It Blues"	Tom Delaney	Clarence Williams, Bob Crosby, Joe Venuti, Les Paul
1950	"Everybody Wants to Go to Heaven (But Nobody Wants to Die)"	Al Fields, Tom Delaney, Timmie Rogers	Tommy Dorsey and his Orchestra, Timmie Rogers, Ellen McIlwaine
