= Stringbean =

Stringbean can refer to

- A green bean or "string bean"
- A runner bean
- David "Stringbean" Akeman, (1915-1973) singer-songwriter, banjo player
- Butler May, known as "Stringbeans", (1894-1917) American vaudeville and blues performer
- "Stringbean", a song by Moka Only from Desired Effect, 2006
