= Sylvester Weaver =

Sylvester Weaver may refer to:

- Sylvester Weaver (musician) (1897–1960), American blues guitarist
- Sylvester "Pat" Weaver (1908–2002), American radio and TV executive
