= Margaret Johnson (vocalist) =

American jazz musician

Margaret Johnson was an American blues and early jazz vocalist and pianist.

Johnson's primary era of recording activity as a vocalist was from 1923 to 1927. Prior to this, she had worked in vaudeville. She is best known for her recording of the song, "Dead Drunk Blues". Her main output was released on the Okeh and Victor labels.

== Biography ==
She recorded with the harmonica player Bobby Leecan and guitarist Robert Cooksey, playing country blues; she also did several recordings with New Orleans jazz ensembles which included Sidney Bechet, Clarence Williams, Louis Armstrong, Bubber Miley, and Tom Morris. In 1924, she recorded "Absent Minded Blues", which was written by Tom Delaney, and another of his compositions, "Nobody Knows the Way I Feel This Mornin'". She was accompanied by Williams on these recordings. She and Clarence Williams also played with the Jazz Rippers, Buddy Christian's ensemble, although Williams was not credited and Johnson was listed under the name Margaret Carter. Her songs were often humorous and sexually suggestive in tone.

In September 1927, she released one of her final recordings, "Second-Handed Blues" / "Good Woman Blues", on Victor Records. After the late 1920s she ceased to record as a vocalist.

Most of Johnson's 1920s sides were reissued on CD by Document Records.

== Confusion ==
She is not to be confused with "Countess" Margaret Johnson (1919–1939), who was active primarily in bands in the 1930s. There can be further confusion in that Sara Martin made several recordings using the 'Margaret Johnson' name.
