= Eddie Heywood Sr. =

American blues and jazz pianist (c. 1901–1942)

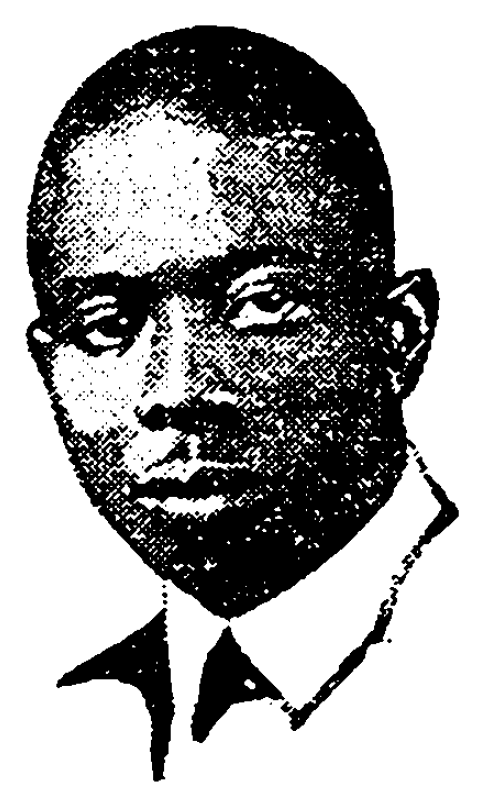
- Eddie Heywood Sr. shown in 1923 advertisement for OKeh Race Records

Background information
- Born: c. 1901
- Died: April 2, 1942 Atlanta, Georgia
- Genres: Blues, Jazz
- Occupation: Musician
- Instrument: Piano
- Years active: 1920s–1930s

Edward Heywood Sr. (c. 1901 – April 2, 1942) was an American blues and jazz pianist, popular in the 1910s and 1920s.

== Biography ==
Eddie Heywood Sr. was a famed pianist of the 81 Theater on Decatur Street in Atlanta, Georgia. He took over that role from Ed Butler around 1912. He recorded songs for Okeh Records, playing solo and also accompanying performers such as Mamie Smith, Sara Martin, Texas Alexander, and Butterbeans and Susie. He taught piano to his son, Eddie Heywood Jr.

He first recorded songs for Okeh in New York in May 1923. In June of that year he accompanied Lucille Bogan on "The Pawn Shop Blues" in Atlanta, a song he had composed. This was the first time a black blues singer had been recorded outside New York or Chicago.

He recorded "The Pawn Shop Blues" again in New York in September 1923 with Martha Copeland on vocals.
