= 152 Nassau =

Historic recording studio in Georgia, US

Coordinates: 33°45′31″N 84°23′32″W

152 Nassau, home to Nassau Street Sessions Recording Studio, was a historic recording studio building in Atlanta, Georgia. The studio recorded blues, jazz, and country musicians in the South beginning in June 1923. Despite the efforts of preservationists and music history aficionados, in 2019, the building was slated to be torn down and replaced by a hotel and restaurant. A Margaritaville Resort is due to open on the site.

One of the first commercial recordings by a rural white musician, Fiddlin' John Carson's "The Little Old Log Cabin in the Lane" was recorded in the building on June 19, 1923. Georgia Public Broadcasting reported that it was the first country music hit. Fannie May Goosby's "Grievous Blues" and Lucille Bogan's "The Pawn Shop Blues" were also recorded there, notable as the first rural blues to be recorded. Other artists to record songs at the studio include Eddie Heywood, Sr., and the Morehouse College Quartet.

Ralph Peer was one of those involved in the studio. The building was later used as a museum with Gone with the Wind memorabilia.

== Demolition ==
Demolition began in August 2019 but was halted after the rear of the building had been torn down. However, a lawsuit attempting to prevent demolition was thrown out in October 2019.
