= Viola Bartlette =

American blues singer

Viola Bartlette was an American blues singer and actress, who recorded on Black Swan Records and Paramount Records. She was from Baltimore. Bartlette recorded under the pseudonym Ida Lewis for Silvertone Records.

She often was a backup singer for Lovie Austin and accompanied Lovie Austin's Blue Serenaders band and Blythe's Sinful Five on records. Johnny Dodds accompanied Bartlette on recordings made in the 1920s. Clarinetist Jimmy O'Bryant backed her on session recordings during 1923 to 1926. She also recorded with Kid Ory.

== Discography ==
- "Tennessee Blues" (1925)
- "Go Back Where You Stayed Last Night" (1925) by Lovie Austin's Blue Serenaders
- "Walk Easy 'Cause My Papa's Here" (1926), by Viola Bartlette with Cobb's Paramount Syncopators, Paramount
- "Shake That Thing" (1926) written by Papa Charlie Jackson
- "Anna Mina Forty And St. Louis Shorty" (1926) by Jimmy Blythe / Blythe's Sinful Five
- "Quit Knocking on My Door" (1926) by Blythe's Sinful Five
- "Sunday Morning Blues" (1926)
- "You Don't Mean Me No Good" (1926)
- "Out Bound Train Blues" (1926)
- "You Can Never Tell When Your Perfectly Good Man Will Do" (1926) by Viola Bartlette with Punch Miller
