= Mynie Sutton =

- Born: October 9, 1903; Niagara Falls, Ontario, Canada
- Died: June 17, 1982 (aged 78) Niagara Falls, Ontario, Canada
- Genres: Jazz
- Occupations: Saxophonist, bandleader
- Instrument: Alto saxophone

Myron Pierman "Mynie" Sutton (October 9, 1903, Niagara Falls - June 17, 1982, Niagara Falls) was a Canadian alto saxophonist and bandleader.

Sutton worked in dance ensembles in Buffalo, New York and Cleveland, Ohio between 1924 and 1931. He returned to Canada in 1931 and founded the Canadian Ambassadors in Aylmer, Quebec; this was one of very few black jazz bands based out of Canada in the 1930s. The group operated out of Montreal from 1933, playing at Connie's Inn, the Hollywood Club, and Cafe Montmartre, in addition to doing tours of Quebec and Ontario. Pianists in the ensemble included Lou Hooper and Buster Harding.

By 1941 the Ambassadors had disbanded, and Sutton returned to his birthplace of Niagara Falls, where he played locally for decades. He made no commercial recordings. A collection of materials devoted to Sutton is held at the Concordia University library in Montreal. Sutton died on June 17, 1982 in Niagara Falls, Ontario. He continued to perform while terminally ill up until two weeks before his death.
