= Will Benbow =

American entertainer (1881–1950)

- Born: William Fuse Benbow; October 15, 1881 or 1882; Montgomery, Alabama, U.S.
- Died: November 18, 1950 (aged 69); Indianapolis, Indiana, U.S.
- Occupation: Vaudeville entertainer
- Spouse(s): Alberta; Edna Hicks

William Fuse Benbow (October 15, 1881 or 1882 – November 18, 1950) was an American vaudeville entertainer who was the manager of the Alabama Chocolate Drops touring company and "a pioneer of black vaudeville entertainment in the southern states in the early part of the twentieth century".

== Biography ==
Benbow was born in Montgomery, Alabama, in either 1881 or 1882, though records show that in later life he claimed dates as late as 1887. He started performing in touring black vaudeville shows by 1899, and in 1902 joined Allen's Minstrels in Birmingham, Alabama as a singer and dancer. He married, and linked up with Ferd "Jelly Roll" Morton, forming a small road show with Morton in about 1906.

The following year, he established Will Benbow’s Chocolate Drops Company in Pensacola, Florida. The company, which also toured as the Alabama Chocolate Drops, included Benbow and his wife Alberta, Morton, and pianist and bandleader Frank Rachel. By 1909, the company had expanded to include singer, pianist and comedian Butler "Stringbeans" May and singer "Ma" Rainey. The company toured widely, in the north and New York City as well as in the southern states, and Jelly Roll Morton remained with the company until 1911. By then, Benbow had remarried, to singer Edna Landry (née Landreaux, 1895–1925). They separated in the mid-1910s, and she later recorded as Edna Hicks for various record labels in Chicago.

In 1916, Benbow formed a new company, "Beans and Benbow’s Big Vaudeville Review”, with Butler "Stringbeans" May, who by then had become one of the foremost black entertainers in the country. The group had fifteen performers, but broke up in early 1917. Benbow was hired to lead another touring group, "C. W. Park's Colored Aristocrats", initially also featuring May who died later that year. Benbow continued to perform in vaudeville shows. In 1918 he was living in Washington, D.C., and by 1920 was in Memphis, Tennessee. In 1925 and 1926 he produced a show, Get Happy, with a troupe of eighteen performers, in Macon, Georgia.

From the 1930s he lived in Indianapolis, where he became MC at a nightclub, the Cotton Club. He died in Indianapolis in 1950, from prostate cancer.
