= Katherine Henderson (singer) =

American blues singer

- Born: June 23, 1909; St. Louis, Missouri, United States
- Died: September 1, 2002 (aged 93) St. Louis, Missouri, United States
- Genres: Classic female blues
- Occupation: Singer
- Instrument: Vocals
- Years active: 1920s–1940s
- Labels: Brunswick, QRS

Katherine Henderson (June 23, 1909 – September 1, 2002) was an American classic female blues singer. Most of her recording sessions took place in Long Island City, New York City, in October and November 1928.

== Career ==
Henderson was born in St. Louis, Missouri. She was the niece of Eva Taylor and Clarence Williams.

As a child, she performed in minstrel shows and on the vaudeville circuit. In the late 1920s, she recorded around ten songs, which were issued by Brunswick Records and QRS Records. In 1927, she starred in Bottomland, an ill-fated New York–based stage musical written by Williams. The show included the song "Take Your Black Bottom Dance Outside", which Henderson recorded. In 1928, she married John Jackson.

Henderson continued performing until 1944, long after her recording career was over.

According to Derrick Stewart-Baxter, Henderson's vocal style was marred by "more than a suspicion of ham", as "she put her material across in a rather lachrymose manner".

She was unrelated to Fletcher, Horace, Edmonia, and Rosa Henderson.

== Selected discography ==
Year	A-side (Songwriter)	B-side (Songwriter)	Notes
1927	"Baltimore" (Danni Healy, Irving Kahal, Jimmy McHugh)	"Take Your Black Bottom Dance Outside" (Clarence Williams, Eddie Green)	Accompanied by Clarence Williams's Blue Five
1928	"West End Blues" (Clarence Williams, King Oliver)	"Saint Louis Blues" (W. C. Handy)	With Clarence Williams & His Orchestra
1928	"Do It Baby" (Christine Yarian, Freddie Perren)	"If You Like Me" (Spencer Williams, Clarence Williams, Fats Waller)	With Clarence Williams & His Orchestra
1928	"Lonesome Lovesick Blues" (Spencer Williams)	"Have You Ever Felt That Way?" (Agnes Castleton, Spencer Williams)	With Clarence Williams & His Orchestra
1928	"What Can You Do Without Me?" (Edgar Dowell)	"Mushy Love" (M. Medina, Edgar Dowell)	With Clarence Williams & His Orchestra

== See also ==
- List of classic female blues singers
