= Ain't Nobody's Business =

Blues standard written by Grainger & Robbins

"'Tain't Nobody's Biz-ness if I Do"

Single by Anna Meyers with the Original Memphis Five
- B-side: "That Da Da Strain"
- Released: 1922
- Recorded: New York City, October 19, 1922
- Genre: Blues
- Length: 3:08
- Label: Pathé Actuelle
- Songwriters: Porter Grainger, Everett Robbins

"Ain't Nobody's Business" (originally "Tain't Nobody's Biz-ness if I Do") is a 1920s blues song that became one of the first blues standards. It was published in 1922 by Porter Grainger and Everett Robbins. The song features a lyrical theme of freedom of choice and a vaudeville jazz–style musical arrangement. It was first recorded, as "'Tain't Nobody's Biz-ness if I Do", in 1922 by Anna Meyers, backed by the Original Memphis Five.

Recordings by other classic female blues singers, including Sara Martin, Alberta Hunter, and Bessie Smith soon followed. In 1947, the song was revived by the jump blues singer Jimmy Witherspoon as "Ain't Nobody's Business". It was the best-selling race record of 1949 and inspired numerous adaptations of the song. In 2011, Witherspoon's rendition was inducted into the Blues Foundation Hall of Fame as a "Classic of Blues Recording".

== Composition and lyrics ==
"'Tain't Nobody's Bus'ness If I Do"
by Sara Martin, with Fats Waller on piano (1922)

The early versions of "Ain't Nobody's Business" feature vocals with piano and sometimes horn accompaniment. They are performed as moderate-tempo blues and have an extended sixteen-bar introduction:

There ain't nothin' I can do nor nothin' I can say, that folks don't criticize me
But I'm gonna do just as I want to anyway, I don't care if they all despise me

The remaining verses are eight bars in length, with the first four describing a situation, such as "If I go to church on Sunday, then cabaret on Monday", and the last four concluding with the refrain "Tain't nobody's biz-ness if I do". The song's eight-bar chord scheme was a model for subsequent "bluesy" Tin Pan Alley songs and R&B ballads in an AABA form. The music and lyrics are usually credited to two pianists – Porter Grainger, who had been Bessie Smith's accompanist from 1924 to 1928, and Everett Robbins, who had his own bands and worked briefly with Mamie Smith. Clarence Williams, who played the piano on Bessie Smith's recording, is sometimes listed as a co-author of the song. BMI, the performing rights organization, lists Grainger, Williams, Witherspoon, and Graham Prince. The original lyrics were copyrighted in 1922 and are now in the public domain.

== Recordings and releases ==
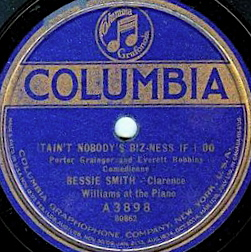
1923 record label listing "Bessie Smith – Clarence Wiliams at the piano"

Anna Meyers recorded "'Tain't Nobody's Biz-ness if I Do" on October 19, 1922, in New York City, backed by the Original Memphis Five. The song was released as a ten-inch 78 rpm single on Pathé Actuelle for the US market by the French-based Pathé Records. Other early recordings include those by Billie Holiday, Sara Martin (with Fats Waller on piano), Alberta Hunter, and Bessie Smith. The lyrics mention an abusive partner:

I'd rather my man would hit me, than to jump right up and quit me ...
I swear I won't call no copper, if I'm beat up by my papa
Tain't nobody's business if I do

In 1928, a country blues rendition was recorded by Memphis, Tennessee, singer-guitarist Frank Stokes. His finger-style acoustic guitar version uses a simple I-IV-V chord progression and different lyrics, including the refrain "It ain't nobody's business but mine".

In the post–World War II blues era, the jump blues singer Jimmy Witherspoon revived the song as "Ain't Nobody's Business". He performed it in the West Coast blues style with understated backing by piano, guitar, bass, drums, and a three-piece horn section. The song was recorded in Los Angeles on November 15, 1947, and released by Supreme Records in September 1948. It entered the record chart on March 5, 1949, and reached number one. Witherspoon's song was the best-selling R&B record of 1949.

== Recognition and influence ==
In 2011, Witherspoon's "Ain't Nobody's Business" was inducted into the Blues Foundation Hall of Fame. According to the Foundation, "its message continued to resonate, as borne out by the remarkable success of Witherspoon's two-part rendition, which remained on the Billboard 'race records' charts for 34 weeks. It was rated No. 3 in all-time chart longevity in Joel Whitburn's Top R&B Singles 1942–1988."

Witherspoon's rendition also inspired numerous artists to record adaptations of the song. Hank Williams Jr. recorded a version for his Lone Wolf album. Released as a single in 1990, it peaked at number 15 on the Billboard Hot Country Singles & Tracks chart. In 1996, a version by H2O (aka Oliver Stumm) featuring Billie (aka Robin Brown-Loetscher) reached number 19 on the UK Singles Chart. This 1996 release was a remake of an earlier version from 1986 credited to Billie and produced by Boyd Jarvis and Timmy Regisford.
