= Kentuckiana Blues Society =

The Kentuckiana Blues Society (KBS) is a U.S. non-profit organization dedicated to the preservation, promotion, and perpetuation of blues music, founded in 1988 and based in Louisville, Kentucky. The KBS is an affiliate member of the Blues Foundation, an international network of blues organizations headquartered in Memphis, Tennessee.

== Preservation ==
The KBS conducts research to document the blues tradition in Louisville, Kentucky, preserving a collection of rare photos and interviews, and identifying the locations of early blues related sites. The society maintains an archive to house these materials, which are available to members. They have arranged for headstones to be placed as memorials at the graves of blues personalities buried in the area, including Sylvester Weaver and Bill Gaither, whose graves were located by the society, and KBS founding member Foree Wells and his wife Lorene, who are buried in Calvary Cemetery. The KBS also provided financial support for the posthumous release of Wells' album It's A New Day Brother! in 2007, on Stackhouse Records.

== Promotion ==
The KBS is actively involved in the local blues scene, sponsoring or supporting concerts in the Louisville area by local and regional artists, such as Albert Collins, Pinetop Perkins, and Henry Townsend.

The KBS was involved in the Garvin Gate Blues Festival from 1988 until it finished in 1999. From 1997 the festival was moved from the Garvin Gate Neighborhood of "Old Louisville" to Theatre Square, co-organized by The Louisville Palace, the Public Radio Partnership, and the KBS. In 2007 the festival was revived at its original location of Garvin Place and Oak Street. The KBS is involved with several other local blues festivals, including the Louisville Blues-n-Barbecue Festival held in mid-July at the Water Tower on Louisville's riverfront, and the Jeffersontown-Crusade Blues Festival held the third weekend in May at Veteran's Memorial Park.

The KBS organizes an "Unsigned Blues Talent" competition for new bands, with the winner eligible to compete in the finals of the International Blues Challenge in Memphis. The contest is usually held in late summer or early fall at Stevie Ray's Blues Bar.

Each year the KBS presents the Sylvester Weaver Award to an individual in recognition of their efforts in representing the mission of the KBS. The society also promotes the blues through formal and informal presentations to various groups, and through sponsorship and presence at festivals and concerts.
