= Lou Hooper =

Canadian jazz pianist

Louis Stanley Hooper (May 18, 1894, North Buxton, Ontario – September 17, 1977, Charlottetown, Prince Edward Island) was a Canadian jazz pianist.

Hooper was raised in Ypsilanti, Michigan and attended the Detroit Conservatory, where he played locally in dance orchestras in the 1910s. He then moved to New York City around 1920; he recorded with Elmer Snowden and Bob Fuller frequently in the middle of the decade, and performed with both of them in Harlem as well as with other ensembles. Hooper served for some time as the house pianist for Ajax Records and accompanied many blues singers on record, including Martha Copeland, Rosa Henderson, Lizzie Miles, Monette Moore, and Ethel Waters. He participated in the Blackbirds revue of 1928.

In 1932, Hooper returned to Canada, where he played in Mynie Sutton's dance band, the Canadian Ambassadors. He did local work solo and in ensembles for the next two decades, then was brought back into the limelight by the Montreal Vintage Music Society in 1962. Hooper released an LP of ragtime piano tunes in 1973 entitled Lou Hooper, Piano. He taught at the University of Prince Edward Island late in his life and appeared regularly on CBC television in Halifax.

His papers, which include unpublished compositions and an autobiography, are now held at the National Library of Canada in Ottawa, Ontario.
