= QRS Music Technologies =

QRS Records
- Parent company: QRS Music
- Founded: 1900
- Founder: Melville Clark
- Genre: Various
- Country of origin: U.S.
- Location: Seneca, Pennsylvania
- Official website: www.qrsmusic.com

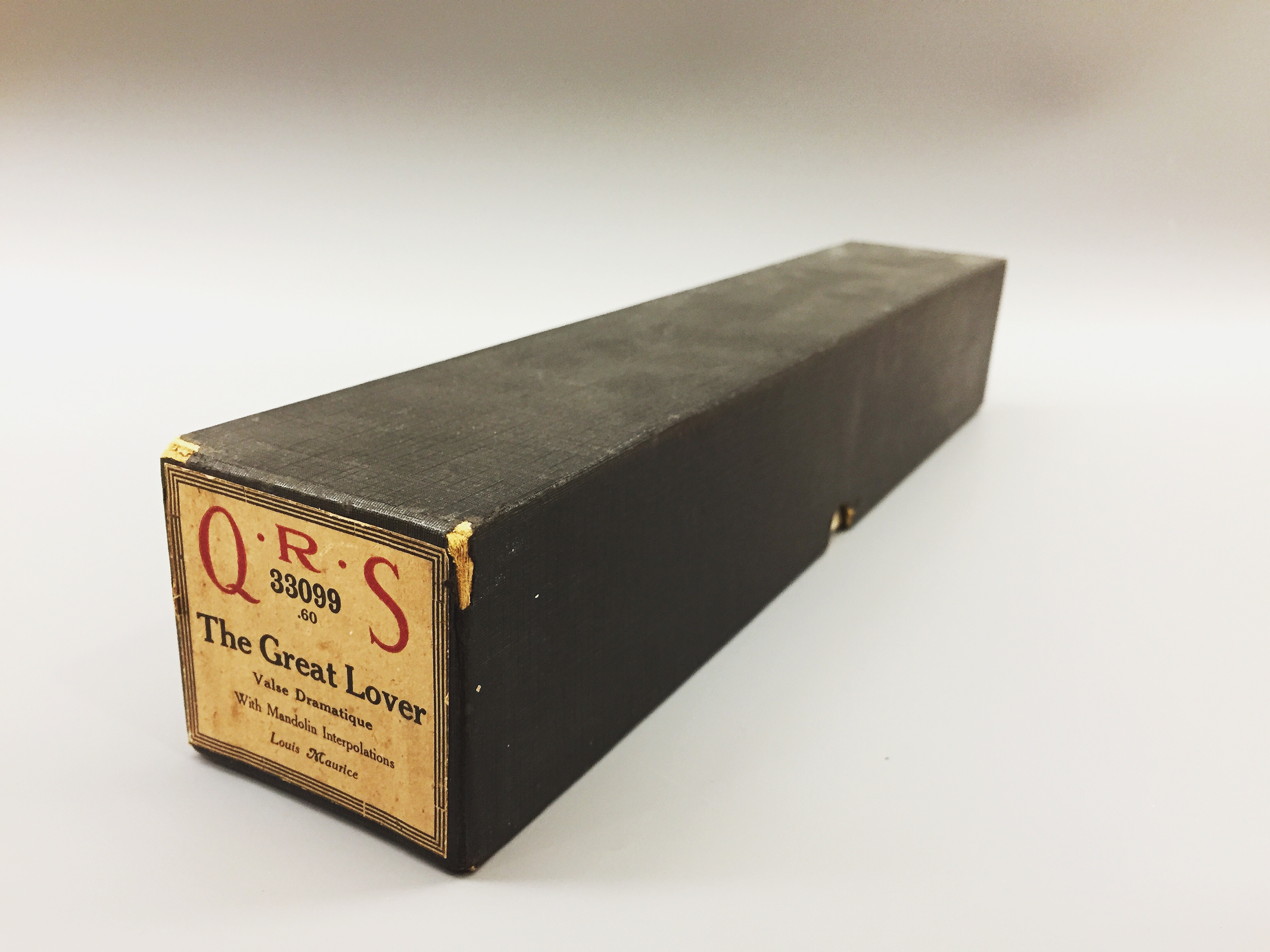
"The Great Lover" by Louis Maurice, recorded by QRS Records

QRS Music Technologies, Inc. is an American company that makes modern player pianos. It was founded as Q•R•S Music Company in 1900 to make piano rolls, the perforated rolls of paper read by player pianos to reproduce music. The company also produced shellac records in the 1920s and 1930s and radios beginning in the 1920s. Today, it makes modern, digital variations on the player piano and the recordings to drive them.

== History ==
QRS was founded in Chicago, Illinois, by Melville Clark (ca. 1850-1918), who also founded the Story & Clark Piano Company, to make piano rolls. It recorded early ragtime and jazz musicians, such as Fats Waller and James P. Johnson.

In 1912, the company introduced the QRS marking piano, one of the first mechanisms for recording the performance of a live pianist to a piano roll, rather than transcribing notes by hand.

The first "hand-played" roll that QRS released was "Pretty Baby" by ragtime pianist Charley Straight. The company went on to capture live performances by Igor Stravinsky, George Gershwin, and Duke Ellington in the era before widespread audio recording and reproduction, "documenting the history of pre-radio 20th century American popular music," as the American Society of Mechanical Engineers put it. "Player pianos provided home entertainment to millions of Americans from 1900 to 1930 and were the first widely successful consumer device to use binary encodement of data in its software, configured as piano rolls." QRS used the marking piano from 1912 until 1931, when other means of recording piano rolls became more efficient.

By 1920, QRS was making piano rolls in Chicago and San Francisco. That year, it opened a five-story, 100,00-square-foot factory in The Bronx, occupying the entire block bounded by 134th Street, 135th Street, Locust Avenue, and Walnut Street. New York City became the center of the firm's recording work.

In 1926, the company cut eleven million rolls.

A record label was begun in the 1920s with three series of discs.

The first edition of discs were reissues of music from Gennett Records which Gennett catalog numbers and label color-scheme. One of these rare and short-lived QRS records is identical to Gennett 5271.

The second edition (1928–1929) included music overseen by Art Satherley, who had worked in the A&R department at Paramount Records. This was the longest-lived edition with a series devoted to jazz and blues and a second series devoted to country music. Among the artists who recorded for QRS were Ed Bell, Clarence Williams, Katherine Henderson, Clifford Gibson, South Street Ramblers, Earl Hines, James "Stump" Johnson, Sara Martin, Anna Bell, Edith North Johnson, and Missionary Josephine Miles.

A third edition began in 1930 by the Cova Record Corporation and was strictly commercial dance bands and vocals specially recorded for QRS, pressed on inferior shellac material. It was a budget-priced label and, based on its rarity, was probably never sold throughout the country. It's doubtful the label survived into 1931. Only 57 numbers (1000-1056) have been traced.

In 1929, the company purchased the DeVry Corporation, a Chicago producer of movie cameras and projectors, and renamed itself QRS-DeVry.

In 1932, the company began selling off various divisions. QRS recording manager Max Kortlander bought the New York assets and operated them as Imperial Industrial Corporation until bringing back the QRS name in the 1940s.

In 1966, Ramsi Tick, manager of the Buffalo Philharmonic Orchestra, bought the company.

In the 1960s, QRS celebrated a player piano revival by restoring its 1912 marking piano to operation, completing the task in 1971. Artists who have since recorded on it include Liberace, Peter Nero, Ferrante & Teicher, George Shearing, Roger Williams, and Eubie Blake.

In 1967, the company moved its headquarters to Buffalo, New York.

In 1987, the company was purchased by Richard A. Dolan.

In the early 1990s, QRS was selling roughly a quarter-million piano rolls a year. It bought the last remaining manufacturer of player pianos, Classic Player Piano, to provide a source of pianos to play its rolls.

In 1992, the American Society of Mechanical Engineers designated the QRS marking piano a National Historical Engineering Landmark.

Still, piano-roll sales dropped over the next 15 years. In the first decade of the 2000s, QRS became the world's last maker of piano rolls after an Australian firm ceased production. Annual sales dropped to about 50,000 in 2006, mostly pop songs. On Dec. 31, 2006, QRS produced its final piano roll—“Spring is Here,” by Rodgers and Hart, recorded by Buffalo-based pianist Michael T. Jones., in its Buffalo factory. It was the company’s 11,060th different recording. At the time, company leaders hoped that they could return to manufacturing piano rolls, and so moved the equipment—some of it more than a century old—to the company's plant in Seneca, Pennsylvania.

Since 1993, QRS has continued selling new player pianos & mechanisms.

In 2008, the last batch of rolls exited the QRS plant, with the memo "end of an era" scribbled on the receipt.

The company now sells its Pianomotion mechanism for turning pianos into player pianos, and sells some prefitted pianos as well. In addition, QRS has continued offloading and selling various parts, rolls, labels, boxes, etc.

== See also ==
- List of record labels

== Bibliography ==
- The American Record Label Book by Brian Rust (Arlington House Publishers), 1978
- American Record Labels and Companies – An Encyclopedia (1891–1943) by Allan Sutton & Kurt Nauck (Mainspring Press), 2000
- The Online 78 Discographical Project website
