= Max Kortlander =

American composer and pianist (1890–1961)

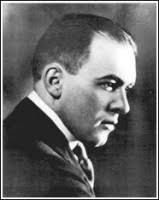
- Born: September 1, 1890; Grand Rapids, Kent County, Michigan, USA
- Died: October 11, 1961 (aged 71); New York, USA
- Resting place: Greenwood Union Cemetery

Maximilian Joseph Kortlander (September 1, 1890 – October 11, 1961) was an American composer, arranger, and pianist. He is best known for his numerous piano rolls which he performed for QRS Music Technologies, Inc. He often collaborated with fellow QRS pianist and composer, Pete Wendling. A song they wrote together in 1922, "Whenever You're Lonesome (Just Telephone Me)" has become a jazz standard.

== Life and career ==
Max Kortlander was born in Grand Rapids, Michigan in 1890 to parents Joseph and Elizabeth Kortlander. He attended the Oberlin College Conservatory after high school, and later the American Conservatory, in Chicago, Illinois. In 1914, he was hired by QRS and began writing his own compositions in 1917. His first songs were entitled "The Ragtime Sailor Man" and "Chicken Pranks".

After moving to New York City, he wrote the hit song "Tell Me" (1919), which was recorded by Al Jolson, one of the most popular singers of the time. It garnered total sales of up to $100,000.

Kortlander worked closely with Pete Wendling after Wendling switched employment to QRS from Irving Berlin, Inc. Music Publishers. Their most successful collaboration, "Whenever You're Lonesome (Just Telephone Me)", was recorded by Billy Murray and Aileen Stanley.

In 1928, he and Wendling wrote a theme for the popular cartoon, Felix the Cat. It was recorded by the Paul Whiteman Orchestra.

Kortlander married Jean Jones in 1911, and adopted a son, Stephen, at around 1917. They also adopted a daughter, also named Jean, in the early 20s. They divorced in 1931. He remarried in 1933 to Gertrude Begoon.

Also in 1931, due to sales declining for QRS piano rolls, caused by the increased popularity of radio, Kortlander bought the assets for them and continued them under the name 'Imperial Industrial Corporation'. He headed the new company until 1940, when he remerged it with QRS.

His composing output lessened in the 1930s, but he still saw his songs recorded by popular singers such as Rudy Vallée and Tommy Dorsey. His last composition was "Something to Live For" (1940).

Piano rolls sales improved at the end of the Great Depression. Kortlander was in charge of QRS piano roll manufacturing until his death of a sudden heart attack in his office on October 11, 1961.

In 1981, Smithsonian Folkways released an album of recordings of Kortlander's piano roll stylings entitled The Piano Roll Artistry of Max Kortlander.

The original cutting machine used by Kortlander to cut piano rolls is on display at the QRS factory in Buffalo, New York.

== Selected piano rollography ==
- "Blue Clover Man"
- "No, No Nora"
- "Deuces Wild"
- "Has Anybody Seen My Corrine?"
- "American Beauty Rag"
- "Dear Old Daddy Long Legs"
- "Derby Day in Dixie"
- "Shim Me Sha Wobble"
- "Climax Rag"
- "Let's Try It"
- "Bo La Bo"
- "Hunting the Ball"
- "Ida, Sweet as Apple Cider"
- "Bigamous Blues"
- "Triangle Jazz Blues"
- "Funeral Rag"
- "Chicago"
- "Russian Rag"

== Selected discography ==
- Henry Burr – "Some Day You'll Know" (1919), Columbia
- Al Jolson – "Tell Me" (1919), Columbia
- Billy Murray & Aileen Stanley – "Whenever You're Lonesome (Just Telephone Me)" (1922), Victor
- Bessie Smith & Clarence Williams – "Keeps On A-Rainin'" (1923), Columbia
- Columbia Dance Orchestra – "Red Moon" (1923), Columbia
- Paul Whiteman Orchestra – "Felix the Cat" (1928), Columbia
- Rudy Vallée and the Connecticut Yankees – "Moonlight Down in Lovers' Lane" (1933), Victor
- Tommy Dorsey Orchestra & Jack Leonard – "I'm the One Who Loves You" (1937), Victor
