= Edna Hicks =

American blues singer and musician

Background information
- Also known as: Edna Landry
- Born: Edna Landreaux or Lucille Landry; October 14, 1891 or 1895; New Orleans, Louisiana, U.S.
- Died: August 16, 1925 (aged 29-33) Chicago, Illinois, U.S.
- Genre: Blues
- Occupation: Singer
- Years active: c.1910–1925

Edna Hicks (October 14, 1891 or 1895 – August 16, 1925) was an American blues singer and musician. Her recorded songs include "Hard Luck Blues" and "Poor Me Blues". She also recorded "Down Hearted Blues", and "Gulf Coast Blues" on the Brunswick label in 1923.

== Biography ==
Hicks's grave at Holy Sepulchre Cemetery

She was born in New Orleans, Louisiana. Although most sources state that her birth name was Edna Landreaux, the daughter of Victor Landreaux and Rena Moore, researchers Bob Eagle and Eric LeBlanc suggest that her birth name was Lucille Landry, the daughter of Victor Landry and Rosa Moore. She was the half-sister of Lizzie Miles.

She is believed to have moved north in her mid-teens. In 1910 she is listed as working as a nurse and still living at home, but on 10 June 1912, as Edna Landry, she married vaudeville performer and touring company manager Will Benbow, and performed in his shows, but they separated after a few years.

She was popular in black vaudeville in the American Midwest in the late 1910s and 1920s, appeared often in Chicago and Cincinnati, and made recordings for seven different record labels in 1923 and 1924: Victor, Vocalion, Columbia, Gennett, Brunswick, Ajax, and Paramount. Her most frequent accompanist was Fletcher Henderson; some of her recordings featured accompaniment by Porter Grainger and Lemuel Fowler. In 1916, she appeared was in a show called Follow Me at Casino Theater in New York City. She also appeared in Billy King's musical comedy Over the Top, and the musical comedies The New American, A Trip Around the World, and A Derby Day in Dixie, all in The Lafayette Theatre in New York City.

In August 1925, while assisting her husband in filling their automobile's gasoline tank, she was burned after splashed gasoline was ignited by a candle she was holding. She died in a Chicago hospital two days later, on August 16. She is buried at Holy Sepulchre Cemetery in Alsip, Illinois. In 2023 The Killer Blues Headstone Project placed a headstone for Edna Hicks at that location.

== Discography ==
| Single | Recording date | Recording location | Company |
|---|---|---|---|
| "Bleeding-Hearted Blues" | July 6, 1923 | New York City, New York | Gennett Records |
| "Down-Hearted Blues" | June 18, 1923 | New York | Brunswick Records |
| "Goin' Home" | November 1923 | New York | Ajax Records |
| "Gulf Coast Blues" | June 18, 1923 | New York | Brunswick Records |
| "I'm Goin' Away" ("Just To Wear You Off My Mind") | March 21, 1923 | New York | Victor Records |
| "Kansas City Man Blues" | November 1923 | New York | Paramount Records |
| "Kind Lovin' Blues" | November 1923 | New York | Ajax Records |
| "Mistreatin' Daddy" | October 1923 | New York | Paramount Records |
| "No Name Blues" ("Same Blues") | September 1923 | New York | Gennett Records |
| "Oh Daddy Blues" | August 18, 1923 | New York | Gennett Records |
| "Sad 'n' Lonely Blues" | July 6, 1923 | New York | Gennett Records |
| "Satisfied Blues" ("A Barrel House Blues") | September 1923 | New York | Gennett Records |
| "Save Your Man and Satisfy Your Soul" | October 11, 1923 | New York | Columbia Records |
| "Squawkin' the Blues" | August 24, 1923 | New York | Vocalion Records |
| "Tain't A Doggone Thing But the Blues" | October 1923 | New York | Ajax Records |
| "Tin Roof Blues" | August 18, 1923 | New York | Gennett Records |
| "Uncle Sam Blues" | November 1923 | New York | Paramount Records |
| "Walking and Talking Blues" | August 7, 1923 | New York | Vocalion Records |
| "Wicked Dirty Fives" | August 24, 1923 | New York | Vocalion Records |

== Bibliography ==
- Harris, Sheldon (1994). Blues Who's Who (Revised Ed.). New York: Da Capo Press. ISBN 0-306-80155-8
