= It's De-Lovely =

1936 song written by Cole Porter

"It's De-Lovely" is one of Cole Porter's hit songs, originally appearing in his 1936 musical, Red Hot and Blue. It was introduced by Ethel Merman and Bob Hope. The song was later used in the musical Anything Goes, first appearing in the 1956 film version (when it was sung by Donald O'Connor and Mitzi Gaynor); in the 1962 revival where it was sung by Hal Linden and Barbara Lang, and in the 2004 biographical film De-Lovely, where it was performed by Robbie Williams.

The hit records in late 1936 and early 1937 included versions by Leo Reisman, Eddy Duchin, Shep Fields, and Will Osborne.

The song played with words that have the prefix "de", which leads to the creation of the neologism "de-lovely": "It's de-lightful, it's de-licious, it's de-lovely."

== Other recordings ==
External audio
- You may hear the song "It's De-Lovely" performed by the Shep Fields Rippling Rhythm Orchestra in 1936; Here on Archive.org

- 1936 Kitty Brown also recorded the song with Les Brown and His Duke Blue Devils.
- 1949 Dinah Shore - for her album Dinah Shore Sings.
- 1949 Ethel Merman - included in the album Songs She Made Famous.
- 1955 Jeri Southern - The Southern Style.
- 1956 Ella Fitzgerald - Ella Fitzgerald Sings the Cole Porter Song Book
- 1956 Vince Guaraldi - Vince Guaraldi Trio
- 1957 Mel Torme - Songs for Any Taste
- 1958 Johnny Mathis - Swing Softly
- 1959 Anita O'Day - Anita O'Day Swings Cole Porter with Billy May
- 1959 Oscar Peterson - Oscar Peterson Plays the Cole Porter Songbook
- 1961 Sue Raney - later released on a compilation album Breathless (1997).
- 1982 Rosemary Clooney - Rosemary Clooney Sings the Music of Cole Porter
- 1984 George Wright covered the song in his album Red Hot and Blue.
- 1997 Stacey Kent - Close Your Eyes
- 2004 Robbie Williams sang the song in the Cole Porter biopic, De-Lovely (2004).
- 2021 Tony Bennett and Lady Gaga recorded a version of the song for their collaborative album Love for Sale.

== In popular culture ==
The song was used by the Chrysler Corporation in advertising DeSoto automobiles, in 1956 singing, "It's Delightful, It's De Lovely, It's DeSoto. Then in 1957 the lyrics changed to "Its delovely, its dynamic, its DeSoto." A 1970s commercial for 7 Up used the song, describing it as "de-sugarfree".
