= Blue Lu Barker =

American jazz and blues singer

- Born: Louisa Dupont; November 13, 1913; New Orleans, Louisiana, United States
- Died: May 7, 1998 (aged 84) New Orleans, Louisiana
- Genres: Jazz, blues
- Occupation: Singer
- Instrument: Vocals
- Formerly of: Danny Barker

Louisa "Blue Lu" Barker (née Louise Dupont) (November 13, 1913 – May 7, 1998) was an American jazz and blues singer. Her better-known recordings include "Don't You Feel My Leg" (1938), which she wrote with her husband; "Georgia Grind"; and "Look What Baby's Got for You".

She was born in New Orleans, Louisiana, and often sang and performed with her husband, guitarist Danny Barker, a regular of the New Orleans music scene.

Barker's recording of "A Little Bird Told Me" was released by Capitol Records as catalogue number 15308 in 1948. It first reached the Billboard chart on December 18, 1948, and lasted 14 weeks on the chart, peaking at number 4.

Barker was inducted into the Louisiana Blues Hall of Fame in 1997, one year before she died in New Orleans, at the age of 84.

== See also ==
- List of classic female blues singers
- List of people from New Orleans, Louisiana
