= Bob Fuller =

American blues and jazz saxophonist (1898–unknown)

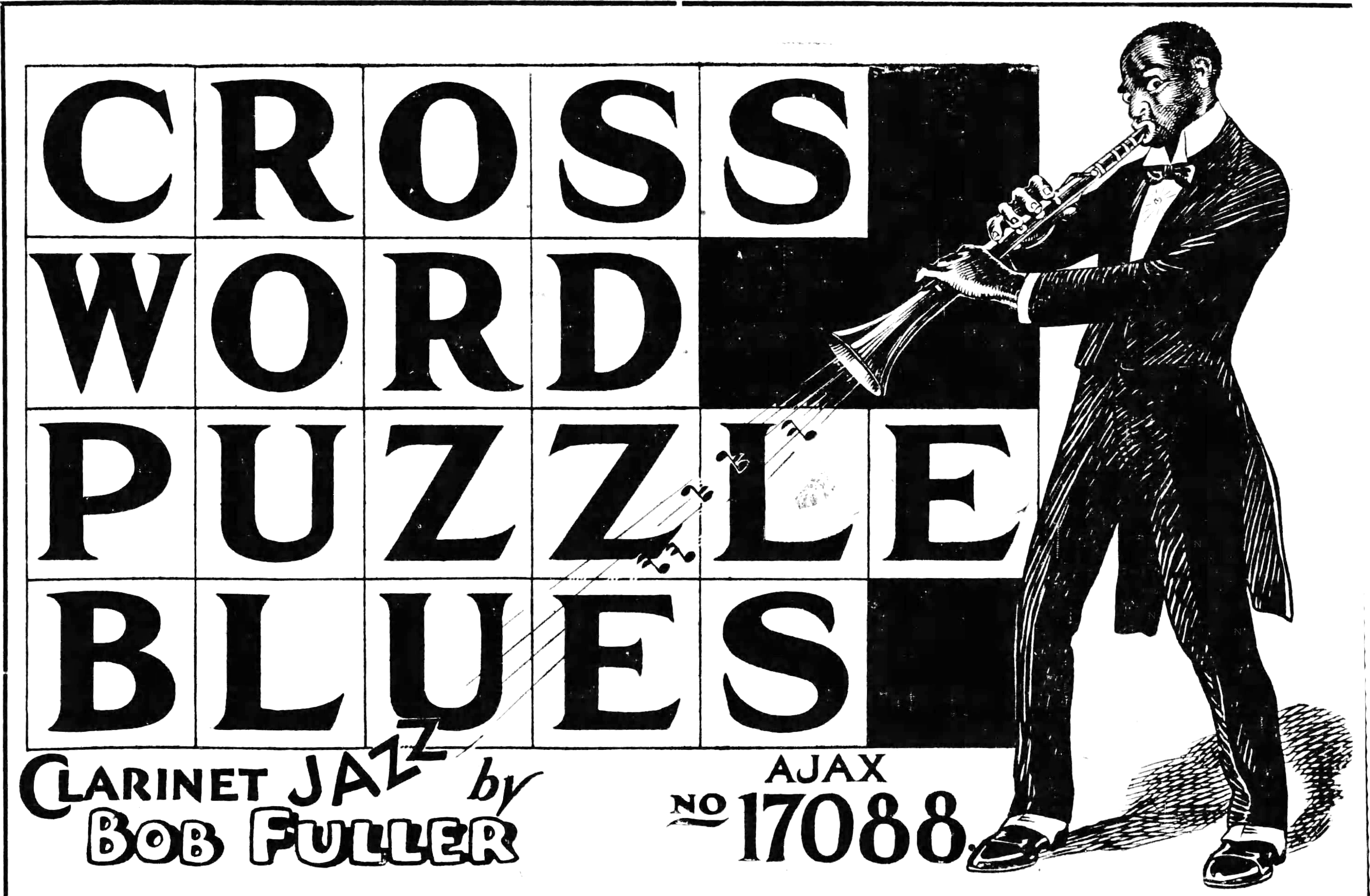
Image promoting the recording "Cross Word Puzzle Blues", appearing in the January 24, 1925, issue of The Chicago Defender

Bob Fuller (December 31, 1898 – unknown) was an American blues and jazz saxophonist and clarinetist, best known for his recordings accompanying female singers in the 1920s.

Born and raised in New York City, Fuller toured the United States with Mamie Smith, then settled down to extensive studio work. He was a house saxophonist for Ajax and Victor Records, playing with Elmer Snowden and Lou Hooper. These musicians also recorded on their own, including as the Five Musical Blackbirds. Fuller also played with Fats Waller's combo, Six Hot Babies.

Fuller worked on at least 140 sessions between 1920 and 1928, accompanying singers such as Martha Copeland, Helen Gross, Rosa Henderson, Maggie Jones, Viola McCoy, and Monette Moore.

Among his many 1920s recordings, his trio sides (with piano and banjo) were issued credited as by "Three Hot Eskimos", "The Black Diamonds", "Three Jolly Jesters", and "Three Monkey Chasers".

Fuller left the music industry permanently after he decided to work in prisons for the New York City Police Department in the 1930s.
