= Porter Grainger =

American dramatist

- Born: Porter Granger; October 22, 1891; Bowling Green, Kentucky, U.S.
- Died: October 30, 1948 (aged 57) Pittsburgh, Pennsylvania, U.S.
- Occupations: Musician; songwriter; playwright; music publisher
- Instruments: Piano
- Years active: c. 1916–1948

Porter Grainger (né Granger; October 22, 1891 − October 30, 1948) was an African American pianist, songwriter, playwright, and music publisher.

== Early life ==
When Grainger was born in Bowling Green, Kentucky, the Granger family name did not include an "i". Although the exact date at which Grainger changed his name is unknown, he registered for the World War I draft by signing his name "Grainger". At that time, he was living in Chicago, and by 1916, he had begun his professional career.

== Music career ==
In the spring of 1920 he left Chicago for New York City, and by 1924, he was living in Harlem. Working with another pianist and composer Bob Ricketts, in 1926, Grainger wrote and published the book How to Play and Sing the Blues Like the Phonograph and Stage Artists.

Though he would never really be known as an exceptional soloist in his own right, Grainger thrived as an accompanist, working with singers such as Fannie May Goosby, Viola McCoy, Clara Smith, and Victoria Spivey. From 1924 to 1928, he worked with blues singer Bessie Smith to record more than a dozen sides for Columbia Records. Amongst the height of his career was the 1928 stage production, Mississippi Days, which also featured Smith.

He was also Mamie Smith's accompanist in the 1929 film short Jailhouse Blues and regularly appeared with her in stage shows. Other female blues singers for whom he wrote songs included Gladys Bryant, Dolly Ross, Ada Brown, and his own wife, Ethel Finnie.

As a bandleader, Grainger made eight recordings. Four of these sides, made with his ensemble the Get Happy Band, featured performances by Sidney Bechet (soprano saxophone), Joe "Tricky Sam" Nanton (trombone) (Duke Ellington sidemen), and Elmer Snowden (banjo). "(In) Harlem's Araby" also appeared on these recordings. The composition was co-written with Jo Trent and Thomas "Fats" Waller, and is still considered one of Grainger's best works.

His last known recording appears to have been in 1932, although he performed and composed into the 1940s. His latter years were undocumented. A death certificate for him, misfiled under the name "Granger Porter", shows that he died on October 30, 1948, at the age of 57, at home in Pittsburgh, Pennsylvania, as a result of accidentally choking on his dentures. He was buried at Greenwood Cemetery in Sharpsburg, Pennsylvania. A copyright renewal application for the How to Play and Sing the Blues book was filed in his name in 1954, but this is believed to have been actioned by his daughter.

== Notable songs ==
Two of Grainger's songs have endured as blues standards: "Tain't Nobody's Business if I Do" (co-authored with Everett Robbins, who had also played piano in Mamie Smith's Jazz Hounds), and "Dying Crapshooter's Blues" (1927). The former has been performed and recorded by several artists, including Bessie Smith, Alberta Hunter, Fats Waller, Jimmy Witherspoon and the Ink Spots. The latter was performed by Martha Copeland, Viola McCoy, and Rosa Henderson, before passing into folk-blues repertoire.

Other songs include the following:

- "What's the Matter Now" (1921)
- "Prescription for the Blues" (1924)
- "Heart Breakin' Joe" (1923)
- "Honey" (1924, with Bob Ricketts)
- "Fortune Teller Blues" (1926)
- "Wylie Avenue Blues" (1927, Joe Davis, co-author)
- "Soul and Body" (1927)
- "Good Time Mama" (1927)
- "Fat and Greasy" (1936)
- "Give It to Him" (1937)
- "I've Got to Have My Ashes Hauled" (1937)
- "One Hour Mama" (1937)
- "Can't You Take a Little Joke" (1939)
- "By an Old Southern River" (1943)
