= Josie Miles =

American vaudeville and blues singer

Josie Miles (c. 1900 – c. 1953–65) was an American vaudeville and blues singer. She was one of the classic female blues singers popular in the 1920s.

Miles was born in Summerville, South Carolina. By the early 1920s she was working in New York City, where she appeared in Eubie Blake and Noble Sissle's musical comedy Shuffle Along. In 1922, Miles made her first recordings for the Black Swan Company. She later recorded for the Gennett, Ajax, Edison, and Banner Records labels. In 1923 she toured the African-American theatre circuit with the Black Swan Troubadours, and performed in New York City in James P. Johnson's revue Runnin' Wild at the Colonial Theatre. In that same year she also performed on WDT radio in New York City.

The blues writer Steve Tracy described Miles as having "a light but forceful delivery that was not low-down but was nevertheless convincing." Her last recordings date from 1925. After the early 1930s, she devoted herself to church activities in Kansas City, Missouri, where she had settled. According to some accounts, Miles died in an automobile accident in the 1950s or 1960s.

In 1928, a preacher billed sometimes as Missionary Josephine Miles and sometimes as Evangelist Mary Flowers recorded six sides of fiery sermons for the Gennett label. It is not known if these recordings are attributable to Josie Miles. The blues historians Paul Oliver and Chris Smith believe that the aural evidence does not support this identification.
