= Sylvester Weaver (musician) =

American blues guitar player

- Weaver with Sara Martin

Background information
- Born: July 25, 1897; Louisville, Kentucky, U.S.
- Died: April 4, 1960 (aged 62) Louisville, Kentucky, U.S.
- Genres: Blues, country blues
- Occupation: Guitarist
- Instruments: Slide guitar, guitjo

Sylvester Weaver (July 25, 1897 – April 4, 1960) was an American blues guitar player and a pioneer of country blues. He was the son of Walter and Mattie (née Embers or Embry) Weaver. Walter Weaver's 1952 Kentucky death certificate indicates that he was born in Port Gibson, Mississippi. That area's economy was heavily agricultural, relying on African American labor to produce a profitable cotton crop. After Walter Weaver migrated to Louisville, Kentucky, Port Gibson would play a role in the preservation and dissemination of a blues tradition indigenous to the Mississippi Delta. This tradition, in the form in which Walter Weaver experienced it, likely was a foundation upon which Sylvester Weaver built his unique performance style.

== Biography ==
Weaver recorded "Longing for Daddy Blues" and "I've Got to Go and Leave My Daddy Behind" with the blues singer Sara Martin, probably on October 24, 1923, in New York City. Two weeks later, as a soloist, he recorded "Guitar Blues" and "Guitar Rag", the first blues guitar instrumentals. Both recordings were released by Okeh Records. They are the first recorded country blues, and the first known recordings of a bottleneck-style slide guitar. "Guitar Rag" (played on a Guitjo) became a blues classic. A cover version recorded by Bob Wills and the Texas Playboys in the 1930s as "Steel Guitar Rag", became a country music standard.

Louisville city directories published between 1916 and 1930 indicate that Weaver, like his parents, lived most of his life in the Smoketown neighborhood and that he supported his music career with employment in various blue-collar jobs. These directories list his occupation as porter (1916–1920), packer (1925), apartment janitor (1928), and chauffeur (1930). The 1938 directory suggests financial hardship during the Great Depression; it indicates that Weaver was living with his parents. By 1949, he and his wife, Dorothy, had moved to a better neighborhood, near Cherokee Park, where they lived in a basement apartment, probably a modest accommodation. His move from Smoketown is roughly contemporaneous with the construction of the Sheppard Square housing project, so he and his parents may have been displaced when the project absorbed his Roselane Court and their Clay Street residences.

Weaver recorded about 50 more songs, sometimes accompanied by Sara Martin, until November 1927. On some recordings from 1927 he was accompanied by Walter Beasley and the singer Helen Humes. Weaver often played his guitar in a bottleneck style, using a knife as a slide. His recordings were successful, but in 1927 he retired and went back to Louisville, where he lived until his death, on April 4, 1960, from carcinoma of the tongue. A revival of interest in the recordings of many country blues artists occurred from the 1950s on, but Weaver died almost forgotten.

A complete collection of his recordings was released on two CDs in 1992. In the same year his hitherto unmarked grave received a headstone by engagement of the Kentuckiana Blues Society, based in Louisville. Since 1989, the society has presented its Sylvester Weaver Award annually to honor those who have rendered outstanding services to blues music.

== Compilation albums ==
- Complete Recorded Works Vol. 1 (1923–1927), 1992, Document Records
- Complete Recorded Works Vol. 2 (1927), 1992, Document Records
