= Kitty Brown =

American classic female blues singer

- Also known as: Bessie Williams, Jane White, Dixie Gray, Rosa Green, Mazie Leroy
- Born: Catherine Brown; October 1899; New York City, United States
- Died: After 1990
- Genres: Classic female blues
- Occupation: Singer
- Instrument: Vocals
- Years active: 1920s–1930s
- Labels: Okeh, Oriole, various

Catherine Brown, known as Kitty Brown (October 1899 – after 1990), was an American classic female blues singer. She sometimes used the pseudonyms Bessie Williams (she was not the only performer to use this name), Jane White, Dixie Gray, Rosa Green, and Mazie Leroy. Brown was active as a recording artist from 1923 to the mid-1930s. Songs she recorded include "I Wanna Jazz Some More" and "It's De-Lovely". Little is known of her life outside music.

== Career ==
Brown was born in 1899 in New York. Most of her recordings were made in 1923 and 1924. In the 1930s she recorded one track with Les Brown's Band of Renown, a version of the Cole Porter song "It's De-Lovely".

The title of her 1924 track "I Wanna Jazz Some More" is misleading. The word jazz was used as a euphemism for bodily fluid, not as a reference to the musical form. In the manner of the time, several of Brown's songs contained sexual innuendo, but not all her tracks were similarly slanted.

Her debut session produced the songs "Evil Blues" and "Mean Eyes (Too Late Blues)". The former track had the notation "accompanied by Rickett Stars", almost certainly another stage name. Her main musical partner was the songwriter LeRoy Morton, who also acted as manager for Clara Smith. Brown and Morton recorded "He's Never Gonna Throw Me Down" and "Keep On Going" for Okeh Records. One of her later recording pseudonyms, Mazie Leroy, may have a connection with her association with Morton. As was becoming more common then, much of Brown's material came from the music-publishing arm of her record label. At a later session she recorded "Family Skeleton Blues", one of her more beguiling records. Among her accompanists was James "Bubber" Miley.

It is likely that contractual agreements with record labels caused her to record with other companies under assumed names, some of which are difficult to verify. The amount of recording she undertook under various other names probably exceeds her output under her own name. Verification of recordings she made as Bessie Williams is difficult, as several other singers used that name. However, Brown has been identified as the singer on several records released on the Domino label, for which she was billed as Williams.

Most of her known work is contained on the compilation album Female Blues Singers, Vol. 3: B/C (1923–1928), issued by Document Records in 1997. Her recordings include the songs "Evil Blues", "Mean Eyes (Too Late Blues)", "Deceitful Blues", "I Don't Let No One Man Worry Me", "He's Never Gonna Throw Me Down", "Keep On Going", "Family Skeleton Blues", "I Wanna Jazz Some More", and "One of These Days".

According to the researchers Bob Eagle and Eric LeBlanc, she was living in a nursing home in Manhattan in 1990. The date of her death is unknown.
