= Butler May =

American vaudeville performer (1894–1917)

- Butler and Sweetie May

Background information
- Also known as: String Beans "The Elgin Movements Man"
- Born: Butler May Jr. August 18, 1894; Montgomery, Alabama, U.S.
- Died: November 17, 1917 (aged 23) Jacksonville, Florida, U.S.
- Genres: Vaudeville, blues
- Occupations: Entertainer, comedian, singer, songwriter
- Instrument: Piano
- Years active: 1909–1917
- Formerly of: Will Benbow; Sweetie May; Butterbeans and Susie

Butler "String Beans" May (August 18, 1894 – November 17, 1917) was an American vaudeville performer, singer, pianist and comedian. He has been described as "the greatest attraction in African-American vaudeville, the first recognizable blues star," and was known "for his streetwise humor, contortive vernacular dancing, and outrageous blues piano playing." He was said to have been the highest-paid black entertainer in the country at the time of his accidental death at the age of 23, and has been claimed as "the model for Jelly Roll [Morton], at least as a stage entertainer and perhaps even as a blues pianist". No recordings of May exist.

== Biography ==
May was born in Montgomery, Alabama, one of a family of eight. His father died when he was a child, and his mother worked in menial jobs. During his childhood, Butler May developed his musical talents by singing and playing piano. By the age of fourteen he had become an accomplished performer, and he joined Will Benbow's "Chocolate Drops Company" on the vaudeville touring circuit. Based in Pensacola, Florida, the troupe also included Jelly Roll Morton and Ma Rainey.

When interviewed by Alan Lomax in 1938, Morton recalled May as "the greatest comedian [he] ever knew", describing him as "a very, very swell fellow, over six feet tall, very slender with big liver lips, and light complexioned. His shoes were enormous and he wore trousers impossible to get over his feet without a shoe horn. He always had a big diamond in his front tooth. He was the first guy I ever saw with a diamond in his mouth, and I guess, I got the idea for my diamond from him".

In 1909, May appeared as half of a double act with comedian Kid Kelly in Atlanta, and acquired the stage name "String Beans" (or "Stringbeans") for his lanky appearance. The following year, he formed a personal and professional relationship with New Orleans-born Sweetie Matthews. They married, and performed regularly together in Benbow's company. In 1911, they played in Chicago at the Monogram theater, one of the top black vaudeville venues in the city, and, according to writers Lynn Abbott and Doug Seroff (2002), "opened the floodgates for other Southern acts, and ensured a prominent place for the blues in American entertainment."

In one of his most popular songs, "Titanic Blues", Stringbeans sang about surviving the catastrophe because of his athleticism. He was known as "The Elgin Movements Man" for his gyrations while playing the piano, and may also have originated the phrase "Elgin movement" as applied to the swaying hips of a shapely woman (as seen in the lyrics of, for example, Robert Johnson's 1936 "Walking Blues"). He was known for his originality in composition and performance, and his improvisational skills with lyrics. One newspaper critic, however, Perry Bradford in Atlanta, claimed that Stringbeans' act was "the smuttiest in the business."

Writer W. L. James, who saw Stringbeans perform around 1914, said of him:

As he attacks the piano, Stringbean's head starts to nod, his shoulders shake, and his body begins to quiver. Slowly, he sinks to the floor of the stage. Before he submerges, he is executing the Snake Hips..., shouting the blues and, as he hits the deck still playing the piano, performing a horizontal grind which would make today's rock and roll dancers seem like staid citizens.

Although their relationship was punctuated by occasional acrimonious separations during which May performed with other partners, Stringbeans and Sweetie toured together intermittently until the end of 1915. Earlier in 1915, they debuted in New York City at the Lafayette Theater in Harlem, later returning for an unprecedented three-week engagement there. As a husband-and-wife team, they directly inspired Butterbeans and Susie, and May was also credited as an inspiration by Ethel Waters.

In February 1916, May formed a new act with Benbow, initially as a four-piece with singers Robbie Lee Peoples and Ebbie Burton, but soon expanding into the "Beans and Benbow's Big Vaudeville Review", with fifteen performers. May was called by one critic "the blues master piano player of the world.... Much of his present popularity is due to his oddities, his eccentricities, differing wholly from anything ever seen on a public stage.... His strange comedy and blues, especially when at the piano, create a furor." After the Review broke up in early 1917, May continued touring as a solo act before joining "C. W. Park's Colored Aristocrats," another review managed by Benbow. However, he soon left, and teamed up with Jodie and Susie Edwards in a new act. After his death, in 1920, the Edwardses debuted their own husband-and-wife act "Butterbeans and Susie."

May died in November 1917, in Jacksonville, Florida, from a broken neck. It is believed that his death was the result of a botched initiation ceremony at a Freemasonry lodge, after a rope was put round his neck. He was paralyzed, and died a week later.
