= Martha Copeland =

American blues singer

- Also known as: Everybody's Mammy
- Born: Martha Williams (possible) c. 1891–1894 (possible); Portsmouth, Virginia, United States
- Died: Unknown
- Genres: Classic female blues, gospel
- Occupation: Singer
- Instrument: Vocals
- Years active: 1923–1928
- Labels: Columbia, Okeh, Victor

Martha Copeland (c. 1891–1894; date of death unknown) was an American classic female blues singer. She recorded 34 songs between 1923 and 1928. She was promoted by Columbia Records as "Everybody's Mammy", but her records did not sell in the quantities achieved by the Columbia recording artists Bessie Smith and Clara Smith. Apart from her recording career, little is known of her life.

== Biography ==
Copeland's birth date is unknown. Paul Oliver, in his record sleeve notes to The Story of the Blues, Vol. 2, suggested that she was in her forties when Victoria Spivey (born 1906) was in her teens. However, the researchers Bob Eagle and Eric LeBlanc suggest that Copeland was born Martha Williams in Portsmouth, Virginia, around 1891–1894.

Copeland started her recording career with Okeh in 1923 and appeared in a vaudeville revue, Shuffle Along. Her output included blues standards, mirror images of current popular tracks ("Soul and Body," in response to Coleman Hawkins's "Body and Soul"), and comedic numbers ("I Ain't Your Hen, Mr. Fly Rooster" and "When the Wind Make Connection with Your Dry Goods"). According to Eagle and LeBlanc, she may be the Martha Copeland who appeared in the musical comedy Woof, Woof in New York in 1929–1930.

Her more notable accompanists on various recordings included Rube Bloom, Eddie Heywood, Sr., Lou Hooper, Cliff Jackson, James P. Johnson, and Louis Metcalf (all on piano), Bob Fuller (clarinet), and Bubber Miley (trumpet).

Her complete recordings are available on Complete Recorded Works, Vol. 1 (1923–1927) and Complete Recorded Works, Vol. 2 (1927–1928), issued by Document Records. Various compilation albums also contain examples of her work.

== See also ==
- List of classic female blues singers

== Listen to ==
- Thomas Edison's Attic: "Blues Singer Martha Copeland Sings on The Eveready Hour", May 15, 1928.
