= Butterbeans and Susie =

20th-century African American comedy duo

- Butterbeans (right) and Susie (left)

Comedy career
- Years active: 1910s – 1960s

Butterbeans and Susie were an American comedy duo comprising Jodie Edwards (July 19, 1893 – October 28, 1967) and Susie Edwards (née Hawthorne; December 1894 – December 5, 1963). They married in 1917, and performed together until the early 1960s. Their act, a combination of marital quarrels, comic dances, and racy singing, proved popular on the Theatre Owners Booking Association (TOBA) tour. They later moved to vaudeville and appeared for a time with the blackface minstrel troupe the Rabbit's Foot Company.

== Career ==
=== Early career and marriage ===
Edwards began his career in 1910 as a singer and dancer. Hawthorne performed in African-American theater. The two met in 1916, when Hawthorne was in the chorus of the show Smart Set. They married onstage the next year.

The two began performing as a comic team. They had been touring with the Theatre Owners Booking Association (TOBA) with an African-American husband-and-wife comedy team, Stringbeans and Sweetie May. Upon the death of Stringbeans (Butler May) in 1917, a TOBA promoter asked Edwards to take the stage name Butterbeans and, with his wife, take over Stringbeans and Sweetie May's act. Butterbeans and Susie appeared for the first time shortly thereafter.

=== Comedy act ===
Butterbeans and Susie's act played up the differences between the two. Susie wore elegant dresses and presented an air of composure and sexiness. Butterbeans, in contrast, played the fool, with his too-small pants and bowler hat, bow tie, tailcoat, and floppy shoes. He was loudly belligerent: "I'd whip your head every time you breathe; rough treatment is exactly what you need." However, his pugnaciousness was belied by a happy demeanor and an inability to resist Susie's charms.

Whereas Stringbeans and Sweetie May stressed song and dance, Butterbeans and Susie emphasized comedy with content that was frowned on by moralists. The typical act featured a duet, a blues song by Susie, a cakewalk dance, and a comedy sketch. Short bouts of bickering peppered the act. The humor often concerned marriage or occasionally black life in general. One of their more popular numbers was "A Married Man's a Fool If He Thinks His Wife Don't Love Nobody but Him". The act was risqué at times. One of their more popular comic songs was Susie's saucy "I Want a Hot Dog for My Roll", full of racy double entendres:

Well I want a dog without bread you see.
Because I carries [sic] my bread with me.
. . .
Give me a big one, that's what I say.
I want it so it will fit my bread.

The song was accompanied by Susie's provocative dancing and Buttberbeans's call-and-response one-liners: "My dog's never cold!" "Here's a dog that's long and lean." "I Want a Hot Dog for My Roll" was one of the few songs that Okeh refused to release.

The act usually ended with a song by Susie that showed that the two really were happily married, followed by Butterbeans's trademark song-and-dance number, "The Heebie Jeebies" or "The Itch". During this dance, Butterbeans thrust his hands in his pockets and began to scratch himself in time with the music. As the tempo increased, he pulled the hands back out and scratched the rest of his body. According to Stearns, this was the moment when the audience "flipped".

=== Recordings and film ===
Butterbeans and Susie made several recordings of blues songs interspersed with comic banter for Okeh Records between 1924 and 1930.

In 1926, they made a recording with Louis Armstrong's Hot Five, a mildly salacious blues number called "He Likes It Slow".

In 1960, they issued an album on King Records' Festival label (FRC-7000).

==== 78 RPM singles - Okeh Records ====
8147A	"Get Yourself a Monkey Man"	5/27/1924
8147B	"When My Man Shimmies"	5/22/1924
8163A	"Construction Gang"	9/12/1924
8163B	"A to Z Blues"	9/15/1924
8180A	"I Can't Use You"	9/15/1924
8180B	"A Married Man's A Fool"	5/22/1924
8182A	"Kiss Me Sweet"	9/12/1924
8182B	"I Got Your Bath Water On"	6/6/1924
8192A	"Adam and Eve"	1/12/1925
8192B	"Consolation Blues"	1/12/1925
8199A	"How Do You Expect Me to Get My Lovin'?"	1/12/1925
8199B	"That Same Dog"	1/12/1925
8202A	"Leaving Blues"	1/12/1925
8202B	"Do Right Papa"	1/12/1925
8209A	"Sue I Don't Want You No More"	5/2/1925
8209B	"I Had a Lonesome Journey Blues"	4/20/1925
8219A	"Hydrant Love"	6/1/1925
8219B	"Brown Skin Gal"	6/1/1925
8224A	"If You Can't Bring It You've Got to Send It"	6/1/1925
8224B	"I'll Put You Under the Jail"	6/1/1925
8233A	"Don't Start Nothin' Here Tonight"	5/2/1925
8233B	"You Ain't Talkin' to Me"	4/20/1925
8241A	"Cold Storage Papa"	6/20/1925
8241B	"Bow Legged Papa"	6/16/1925
8303A	"You're Folks Will Start Wearing Black"	3/10/1926
8303B	"Let the Doorknob Hit You in the Back"	3/10/1926
8307A	"Not Until Then"	3/10/1926
8307B	"Not Until Then Pt.2"	3/10/1926
8319A	"Mama Stayed Out the Whole Night Long"	3/10/1926
8319B	"Tain't What You Used to Have"	3/10/1926
8323A	"Love Me and the Whole World is Mine"	3/24/1926
8323B	"Deacon Bite 'Em in the Back"	3/24/1926
8335A	"Not Today, Sweet Mama"	3/24/1926
8335B	"You Know Why Your Mama Has the Blues"	3/24/1926
8355A	I Can't Do That"	6/18/1926
8355B	"He Likes It Slow"	6/18/1926
8392A	"Da Da Blues"	9/22/1926
8392B	"My Daddy's Got the Mojo"	9/22/1926
8399A	"Papa Don't Hold Back on Me"	9/22/1926
8399B	"Sweet Papa Butterbeans"	9/22/1926
8432A	"Yes I've Been Cheatin'"	12/5/1926
8432B	"Hard Luck Blues"	12/5/1926
8502	"You're a No Count Triflin' Man"	5/6/1927
8502	"Oh Yeah"	3/31/1927
8520	"Deal Yourself Another Hand"	9/24/1927
8520	"Jelly Roll Queen"	9/24/1927
8556	"Taint None of Your Business"	9/24/1927
8556	"Gonna Make You Sorry"	5/6/1927
8598	"There's Been Some Changes Made"	6/30/1928
8598	"Watch Your Step"	6/30/1928
8614	"I Aint Scared of You"	6/27/1928
8614	"Fast Fadin' Papa"	6/27/1928
8670	"That's More Than I Can Stand"	2/21/1929
8670	"I Want a Good Man"	2/21/1929
8687	"Get Away From My Window"	2/21/1929
8687	"Get Yourself a Monkey Man	2/21/1929
8701	"Put Your Mind Right on It"	2/21/1929
8701	"Gonna Start Looking for a Man to Treat Me Right"	2/21/1929
8769	I Ain't Gonna Do That No More"	2/1/1930
8769	"Better Stop Knockin' Me Around"	2/1/1930
8833	"Elevator Papa"	8/11/1930
8833	"Times is Hard"	8/11/1930
8893	"You Dirty Mistreater"	1/30/1930
8893	"Broke Down Mama"	1/30/1930
8911	"Deal Yourself Another Hand"	8/13/1930
8911	"Radio Papa"	1/30/1930
8950A	"Papa Ain't no Santa Claus"	8/13/1930
8950B	"What it Takes to Bring You Back"	2/1/1930

== Legacy ==
Butterbeans and Susie used their fame and influence to help younger black comedians. After seeing Moms Mabley in Dallas, for example, they helped her gain acceptance at better venues. Even after leaving show business, they remained friends with many black entertainers and put up down-on-their-luck comedians in their Chicago home. Stepin Fetchit stayed with them at some point in the 1950s or 1960s.

Susie Edwards died on December 5, 1963. Jody (Butterbeans) Edwards died on October 28, 1967, at the Dorchester Inn outside of Chicago, Illinois.

In 2020 the Killer Blues Headstone Project placed a headstone for Susie Edwards at Mt. Glenwood Cemetery in Thornton, Illinois, and in 2024 placed a headstone for Jodie Edwards at Burr Oak Cemetery in Alsip, Illinois.

== Bibliography ==
- Eagle, Bob; LeBlanc, Eric S. (2013). Blues - A Regional Experience. Santa Barbara: Praeger Publishers. ISBN 978-0313344237.
- Fox, Ted (1983). Showtime at the Apollo. Da Capo. ISBN 0-306-80503-0.
- Harris, Sheldon (1994). Blues Who's Who (Rev. ed.). New York: Da Capo Press. ISBN 0-306-80155-8.
- Watkins, Mel (1994). On the Real Side: Laughing, Lying, and Signifying—The Underground Tradition of African-American Humor That Transformed American Culture, from Slavery to Richard Pryor. New York: Simon & Schuster. ISBN 0671689827.
