= Jailhouse Blues =

1929 film

Jailhouse Blues (1929) is a short, black and white musical film with a run time of only 7 minutes. It was released on June 19, 1929 by Columbia Pictures. The film was filmed in English in Camden, New Jersey and directed by Basil Smith. The film features Mamie Smith, the star. She was a major figure in early blues and a top star in Black Vaudeville. Additionally, she was a recording artist with Okeh Records, but shortly after Jailhouse Blues was made her contract with Okeh had ended (1931).

Currently, the actual film sits at the Library of Congress, where it has been for a while. For a while, the soundtrack disc was nowhere to be found. There was one point where a disc was located but then it was accidentally destroyed in shipping. However, in 2009, an intact disc was discovered in Australia and was preserved in March 2011. Two short clips from Jailhouse Blues were shown on a 1961 DuPont Show of the Week broadcast, and this has served as the source of the widely circulated clips and audio from the film since.

== Synopsis ==
Mamie's significant other (man) is in jail, and she misses him. She pleads for his release through her singing and songs. Since the film is only 7 minutes and contains 2 songs, the narrative is entirely centered around this emotional begging by singing.

== Cast ==
- Mamie Smith
- Homer Tutt
- Porter Grainger
- Billy Mitchell
- Andrew Fairchild

== Soundtrack ==
Two songs were prerecorded by Victor Records for the film's soundtrack:

- "Jailhouse Blues" – This song was written by Clarence Williams and Bessie Smith. The song was sung by Mamie Smith in the film. Additionally, Bessie Smith also sang her own rendition of the song.
- "You Can't Do It!"
