= Monette Moore =

American jazz singer (1902–1962)

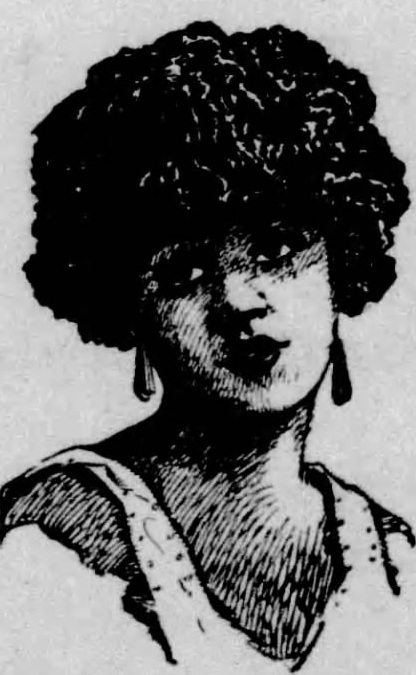
- Drawing of Moore as Susie Smith in a 1925 Ajax Records advertisement

Background information
- Also known as: Susie Smith
- Born: May 19, 1902; Gainesville, Texas, U.S.
- Died: October 21, 1962 (aged 60) Garden Grove, California, U.S.
- Genres: Jazz; classic female blues
- Occupation: Musician
- Instruments: Vocals; piano
- Years active: early 1920s
- Label: Paramount
- Formerly of: Charlie Johnson band

Monette Moore (May 19, 1902, in Gainesville, Texas – October 21, 1962, in Garden Grove, California) was an American jazz and classic female blues singer.

== Background ==
Moore was raised in Kansas City, Missouri. She taught herself to play the piano in her teens and worked as a theater pianist in Kansas City in the early 1920s. In 1923 and 1924, she recorded for Paramount Records in Chicago and New York City, relocating to the latter city. In the 1920s, she worked in Chicago, Dallas, and Oklahoma City. She sang with Charlie Johnson's ensemble at Smalls Paradise and recorded with him in 1927 and 1928. She recorded 44 songs from 1923 to 1927, some under the name Susie Smith. Her sidemen included Tommy Ladnier, Jimmy O'Bryant, Jimmy Blythe, Bob Fuller, Rex Stewart, Bubber Miley, and Elmer Snowden. From 1924 to 1941, she worked in theaters and clubs in New York. She appeared with Lucky Millinder at the Lafayette Theater in 1931.

In the 1930s, Moore recorded with Fats Waller (1932), filled in for Ethel Waters as an understudy, and sang with Zinky Cohn in Chicago in 1937. She performed at her own club, Monette's Place, in New York City in 1933. Around 1940, she sang in New York with Sidney Bechet and Sammy Price. In 1942, she moved to Los Angeles, where she performed often in nightclubs. She appeared in James P. Johnson's revue Sugar Hill (c. 1949) and played minor roles in numerous films, including Yes Sir, Mr. Bones (1951) and The Outsider (1961). Moore recorded again from 1945 to 1947.

She made a brief cameo appearance in the 1954 remake of A Star is Born, starring Judy Garland. Moore sang a brief refrain in the song-and-dance number, "Lose That Long Face", which was edited out of the film before it was released. This extended version of the song has been reconstructed and can be seen on YouTube.

In Los Angeles in the 1950s, she continued to perform in local venues but also worked as a maid and restroom attendant. She played with the Young Men of New Orleans at Disneyland in 1961–1962.

Moore died of emphysema in October 1962.

== Filmography ==
| Year | Title | Role | Notes |
|---|---|---|---|
| 1951 | Yes Sir, Mr. Bones | Herself | |
| 1954 | A Star Is Born | Blues singer | Uncredited |
| 1961 | The Outsider | Singer | Uncredited (final film role) |
