= Louis Metcalf =

American jazz trumpeter (1905–1981)

Louis Metcalf (February 28, 1905 – October 27, 1981) was an American jazz trumpeter who played for a short time with Duke Ellington.

== Early life ==
Metcalf was born in Webster Groves, Missouri, United States. As a youth he first trained on the drums but switched over to cornet permanently. As a teenager in St. Louis, Missouri he played with Charlie Creath.

== Career ==
Metcalf moved to New York City in 1923 and participated in the fertile jazz scene there, playing with such musicians as Willie "The Lion" Smith, Jelly Roll Morton, Benny Carter and King Oliver. In 1926, Duke Ellington hired Metcalf to play in his seminal orchestra, where his mellow tone contrasted with Bubber Miley's. In the 1930s, Metcalf led his own bands and joined Fletcher Henderson's.

In 1946, Metcalf moved to Montreal, Canada, and formed the International Band, the first to play the nascent bebop style in Canada. Under his leadership the Café Saint-Michel was the hub of the jazz scene in Montreal for a few years, with local musicians such as the young Oscar Peterson and visiting Americans such as Art Pepper, Fats Navarro and Sonny Rollins sitting in with the band.

A drug bust prompted Metcalf to return to New York City in 1951. He released an album entitled I've Got The Peace Brother Blues in 1966, where he demonstrated that his style had indeed evolved since his days with Ellington.

== Death ==
Metcalf was less active after falling ill in 1968 and died in 1981. Metcalf was survived by his wife, Shirley Metcalf, and his children, Louis Metcalf, Charles Metcalf, Jay Metcalf, Patrick Metcalf, and Savannah Metcalf.
