= Ajax Records =

American record company and label

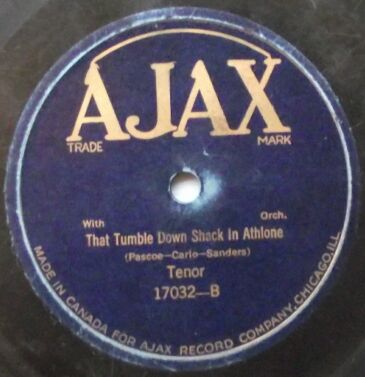
- Parent company: Compo Company
- Founded: 1921
- Founder: Compo Company
- Defunct: 1925
- Status: Defunct
- Genre: Jazz, blues
- Country of origin: U.S.

Ajax Records was a record company and label founded in 1921. Jazz and blues records were produced in New York City, with some in Montreal, and marketed via the Ajax Record Company of Chicago.

== History ==
Ajax was a subsidiary of the Compo Company of Lachine, Quebec. Although a U.S. trademark on the name "Ajax" was filed in 1921, Ajax did not issue its first record until October 1923. The head of Ajax Records was H. S. Berliner, son of disc record pioneer Emile Berliner. Berliner's corporate headquarters were in Quebec City, Quebec, although U.S. issues listed the company as being based in Chicago, Illinois, where its U.S. office was located, but apparently no recording studio. Ajax is known to have used Compo's recording studios in Montreal and New York City. In addition to the sides which Ajax recorded themselves, the label also issued discs pressed from masters leased from New York Recording Laboratories and the Regal Record Company. The last Ajax released was in August 1925.

== Recordings and marketing ==
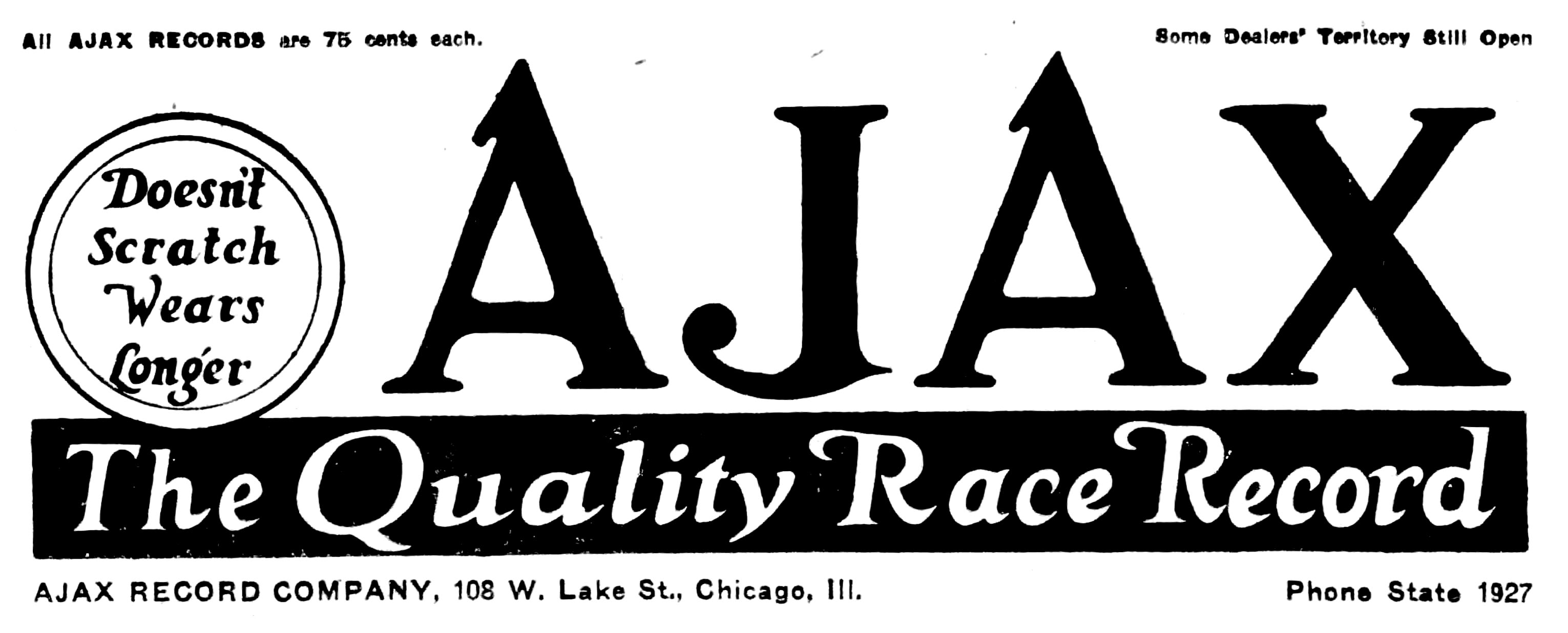
Highlight from a 1925 ad

Ajax was marketed as "The Superior Race Record" and "The Quality Race Record". Their recordings sold for 75 cents apiece. The records were pressed in Quebec but distributed in USA only, and were Compo's only operations in the United States. Distribution of Ajax Records in the USA outside of the north-east and north-central part of the nation seems to have been poor. The records carried a catalog sequence of 17000, ending with 17136. Rosa Henderson, Edna Hicks, Viola McCoy, Helen Gross, Monette Moore, Ethel Finnie, and Fletcher Henderson were among those who recorded for the label. Mamie Smith, who went on to record for Victor Records when Ajax folded, was signed away from Okeh Records in 1924. Joe Davis was an important talent scout for the label. Although marketed as a race records label, some mainstream material was released, including classical violin solos and pop sides by Arthur Fields and Arthur Hall and some country music.

== Legacy ==
After Ajax was discontinued in 1925, some of the masters were reissued on the American Pathé label. The audio fidelity of Ajax discs is above average for the time. Most issues are acoustic, but some late Ajax releases are electrically recorded. The historical and musical importance of the performances, and the quality of the recordings and pressings, make Ajax records highly sought after by some record collectors.

== See also ==
- List of record labels
