= Maggie Jones (blues musician) =

American blues singer and pianist (1894–1940)

- Also known as: Fay (or Fae) Barnes; The Texas Moaner; The Texas Nightingale
- Born: March 1894; Hillsboro, Texas, United States
- Died: March 9, 1940 (aged 45–46) Fort Worth, Texas, United States
- Genres: Blues
- Occupation: Musician
- Instruments: Vocals; Piano
- Years active: 1922–1938
- Labels: Black Swan, Victor, Pathé, Paramount, Columbia

Maggie Jones (March 1894 – March 9, 1940) was an American blues singer and pianist who recorded 38 songs between 1923 and 1926. She was billed, alternately, as "The Texas Moaner" and "The Texas Nightingale". Among her best-remembered songs are "Single Woman's Blues", "Undertaker's Blues", and "Northbound Blues".

One commentator noted "Never as highly rated as Bessie Smith or Clara Smith, she easily bears comparison with either".

== Biography ==
Jones was born in Hillsboro, Texas, to Pomp and Augusta Jones (né Craige). Her birth name is sometimes given as Fae Barnes, and her year of birth as 1900, but the researchers Bob Eagle and Eric LeBlanc state that she was born in 1894 and that "Fae Barnes" was a stage name. She relocated to New York in 1922, where she performed in nightclubs. She appeared at the Princess Theater in Harrisburg, Pennsylvania, in 1922, and toured the Theater Owners Booking Association circuit until about 1926.

Her debut recording session was on July 26, 1923, for Black Swan Records, where she was the first singer from Texas to record. She recorded for several record labels, including Black Swan, Victor, Pathé and Paramount, but most of her work was released by Columbia. On Black Swan and Paramount, she was billed as Fae (or Fay) Barnes; on Pathé and Columbia she recorded as Maggie Jones.

Over a three-year period, she was accompanied by such notables as Louis Armstrong, Fletcher Henderson, Charlie Green, and Elmer Snowden. Jones is especially noted for the six sides on which she was backed by Henderson and Armstrong; the writer Derrick Stewart-Baxter singled out "Good Time Flat Blues" as "her masterpiece". A song titled "Anybody Here Want to Try My Cabbage" was recorded by Jones on December 10, 1924, and this was released as a single on March 30, 1925. That song was written by Andy Razaf, Edgar Dowell and Fats Waller. Jones recording used the backing accompaniment of Armstrong and Henderson. With Henderson and Green she recorded "North Bound Blues", with lyrics containing trenchant references to the South's Jim Crow laws, which was unusual for a classic female blues singer. In 1925, Jones recorded four songs written by Tom Delaney, including "If I Lose, Let Me Lose (Mamma Don't Mind)". By October 3, 1926, Jones had cut her final disc. In 1927, she performed with the Clarence Muse Vaudeville Company and sang in Hall Johnson's choir at the Roxy Theater in New York City.

In 1928–1929, Jones appeared with Bill Robinson in the Broadway production of Lew Leslie's revue Blackbirds of 1928, which toured the United States and Canada. She often worked outside the music industry, including co-owning a clothes store in New York. By the early 1930s Jones moved on to Dallas, Texas, and ran her own revue troupe, which performed in Fort Worth. In the winter and spring of 1938, she performed at a variety of local venues, concluding with a June 15 appearance alongside film and recording star Herb Jeffries, broadcast live from Ft. Worth's Grand Theater. Jones subsequently disappeared from the public eye. She died in Fort Worth of acute myocarditis on March 9, 1940.

Her total recorded output is available on Maggie Jones, Complete Recorded Works in Chronological Order, Vol. 1 (August 1923 to April 1925) and Maggie Jones, Complete Recorded Works in Chronological Order, Vol. 2 (May 1925 to June 1926) (with Gladys Bentley, Complete Recorded Works in Chronological Order (1928/1929)).

== See also ==
- List of blues musicians
- Classic female blues
