= Jimmy O'Bryant =

American jazz clarinetist

- Born: c. 1896; Arkansas, U.S.
- Died: June 24, 1928 (aged 31–32); Chicago, Illinois, U.S.
- Genres: Jazz
- Instrument: Clarinet

J. A. "Jimmy" O'Bryant (c. 1896 – June 24, 1928) was an American jazz clarinetist.

== Career ==
O'Bryant played with the Tennessee Ten in 1920 and 1921, then in a group with Jelly Roll Morton and W. C. Handy in 1923. In 1924, he played with King Oliver. From 1923 to 1926, he recorded extensively with Lovie Austin's Blues Serenaders and also did sessions with his own Washboard Band. His entire output as a leader was reissued on two compact discs by RST Records in 2000 and 2001.
