= Sara Martin =

American blues singer (1884–1955)

Martin with Sylvester Weaver

Sara Martin (June 18, 1884 – May 24, 1955) was an American blues singer, in her time one of the most popular of the classic blues singers. She was billed as "The Famous Moanin' Mama" and "The Colored Sophie Tucker". She made many recordings, including a few under the names Margaret Johnson and Sally Roberts.

== Biography ==
Martin was born Sara Dunn in Louisville, Kentucky, and was singing on the African-American vaudeville circuit by 1915. She was the daughter of William T. Dunn and Mary Katherine "Katie' Pope. She was married three times, the first marriage to Christopher Wooden when she was 16. Christopher Wooden died in 1901. Her second marriage was to Abe Burton. At the time of her death she was married to Hayes Buford Withers. She began a successful recording career when she was signed by Okeh Records in 1922. Through the 1920s she toured and recorded with such performers as Fats Waller, Clarence Williams, King Oliver, and Sylvester Weaver. She was among the most-recorded of the classic blues singers.

You Got Everything A Sweet Mama Needs But Me
"You Got Everything a Sweet Mama Needs but Me", sung by Martin, with piano accompaniment by Thomas "Fats" Waller in 1922

'tain't Nobody's Bus'ness If I Do
"'Tain't Nobody's Bus'ness if I Do", sung by Martin, with piano accompaniment by Fats Waller in 1922

She was possibly the first to record the famous blues song "'T'aint Nobody's Bus'ness if I Do", with Waller on piano, in 1922.

On stage she was noted for a dramatic performing style and for her lavish costumes, which she changed two or three times per show. In his book Ma Rainey and the Classic Blues Singers, Derrick Stewart-Baxter said of her:

...she was never a really great blues singer. The records she made varied considerably, on many she sounded stilted and very unrelaxed. ... Occasionally, she did hit a groove and when this happened, she could be quite pleasing, as on her very original "Brother Ben". ... The sides she did with King Oliver can be recommended, particularly "Death Sting Me Blues".

According to the blues historian Daphne Duval Harrison, "Martin tended to use more swinging, danceable rhythms than some of her peers ... when she sang a traditional blues her voice and styling had richer, deeper qualities that matched the content in sensitivity and mood: "Mean Tight Mama" and "Death Sting Me" approach an apex of blues singing".

Martin's stage work in the late 1920s took her to New York, Detroit, and Pittsburgh and to Cuba, Jamaica, and Puerto Rico. She made one film appearance, in Hello Bill, with Bill "Bojangles" Robinson, in 1929. Her last major stage appearance was in Darktown Scandals Review in 1930. She performed with Thomas A. Dorsey as a gospel singer in 1932, after which she worked outside the music industry, running a nursing home in Louisville.

Martin died in Louisville of a stroke in May 1955.

== Discography ==
- 1922–23 – In Chronological Order Vol. 1 (Document Recs, 1995)
- 1923–24 – In Chronological Order Vol. 2 (Document Recs, 1995)
- 1924–25 – In Chronological Order Vol. 3 (Document Recs, 1995)
- 1925–26 – In Chronological Order Vol. 4 (Document Recs, 1995

=== Anthologies ===
- 1922–27 – The Famous Moanin' Mama (Retrieval, 2001)

== Bibliography ==
- Harris, Sheldon (1994). Blues Who's Who. Rev. ed. New York: Da Capo Press. ISBN 0-306-80155-8.
- Harrison, Daphne Duval (1990). Black Pearls: Blues Queens of the 1920s. New Brunswick, N.J., and London: Rutgers University Press. ISBN 0-8135-1280-8.
- McWilliams, Peter (1996). Ain't Nobody's Business if You Do: The Absurdity of Consensual Crimes in Our Free Country. Prelude Press. ISBN 0-931580-58-7.
- Stewart-Baxter, Derrick (1970). Ma Rainey and the Classic Blues Singers. London: Studio Vista. OCLC 250212516.
