= Rosa Henderson =

American jazz/blues singer and entertainer (1896–1968)

- Born: Rosa Deschamps; November 24, 1896; Henderson, Kentucky, U.S.
- Died: April 6, 1968 (aged 71) Roosevelt Island, New York, U.S.
- Genres: Classic female blues, jazz
- Occupation: Vocalist
- Years active: 1920s–1930s
- Labels: Paramount, Victor, Columbia, Vocalion, Ajax, Pathe & Perfect, Brunswick, Silvertone, Emerson, Banner, Oriole, Regal, Domino, Edison, Marathon

Rosa Henderson (November 24, 1896 – April 6, 1968) was an American jazz and classic female blues singer and vaudeville entertainer of the Harlem Renaissance era. One commentator noted that "her large record output and continuing success on the stage indicate the popularity of her big voice and engaging persona".

== Life and career ==
Born Rosa Deschamps in Henderson, Kentucky, she is remembered as one of the better known female blues singers of the 1920s and 1930s classic blues era. Her career as an entertainer began in 1913 when she joined her uncle's circus troupe. She married Douglas "Slim" Henderson in 1918 and began traveling with his Mason-Henderson show. Her career as a musical comedian started during the early 1920s, after she moved to New York, where she performed on Broadway. She eventually also performed in London.

Her nine-year recording career began in 1923. During that time she recorded over one hundred songs, sometimes using pseudonyms such as Sally Ritz, Flora Dale, Sarah Johnson, Josephine Thomas, Gladys White, and Mamie Harris. She was accompanied by the Virginians, Fletcher Henderson's Jazz Five, Fletcher Henderson's Orchestra, Fletcher Henderson's Club Alabam Orchestra, the Choo Choo Jazzers, the Kansas City Five, the Three Jolly Miners, the Kansas City Four, the Three Hot Eskimos, and the Four Black Diamonds. She recorded for Ajax Records, Columbia, Paramount, Victor, and Vocalion Records.

Her recordings include "Afternoon Blues" (1923), "Doggone Blues" (1931), "Do Right Blies" (1924), "He May Be Your Dog But He's Wearing My Collar" (1924), and "Papa If You Can't Do Better (I'll Let a Better Papa Move In)" (1926). She sang the chorus on Fletcher Henderson's May 28, 1924, Vocalion recording of "Do That Thing".

Although there was a marked decline in the number of her recordings after 1926, which was largely due to the death of her husband, Slim, in 1928, she continued performing until 1932, when she took a job in a New York department store. She continued to perform benefit concerts until the 1960s.

Henderson had two children and died of a heart attack in 1968.

She is unrelated to Fletcher, Horace, Katherine, or Edmonia Henderson.

== See also ==
- Four Eleven Forty Four
- Classic female blues
