= Viola McCoy =

American blues singer (c. 1900 – c. 1956)

Viola McCoy (c. 1900 – c. 1956) was an American blues singer who performed in the classic female blues style during a career that lasted from the early 1920s to the late 1930s.

== Life and career ==
Her birth name may have been Amanda Brown (a name under which she sometimes recorded). She is believed to have been born in Mississippi, although a press release of 1924 claimed she was from Memphis, Tennessee. She performed with the sideshow annex band attached to Sparks Circus in 1916, performing the comic "Scaddle-de-Mooch," written by Cecil Mack in 1915, and "Daddy," a blues number. "Daddy" may be an early version of "Oh, Daddy," recorded by Ethel Waters in 1921 and Bessie Smith in 1922. In 1917, McCoy toured with the Georgia Smart Set. In the early 1920s, she moved to New York City, where she worked in cabarets and appeared in revues at the Lincoln and Lafayette Theatres. She toured the Theater Owners Booking Association vaudeville circuit and made numerous recordings from 1923 to 1929 for various labels, including Gennett, Vocalion, and Columbia Records.

On her recordings from 1923 her most frequent accompanist was the pianist Porter Grainger; later accompanists included Fletcher Henderson, Louis Hooper, and Bob Fuller, among others. A few of her recordings are enlivened by kazoo solos performed by McCoy.

In 1927, she briefly owned and performed in Jack's Cabaret in New York City. By 1930 she owned and operated a nightclub in Saratoga Springs, New York. In 1938, she settled in Albany, New York, and was mostly inactive in music during the remainder of her life. McCoy is thought to have died in Albany, New York, in about 1956.

Author Derrick Stewart-Baxter wrote of McCoy, "She belongs to the great vaudeville tradition, but in all she does there is a strong jazz strain ... Possessing a lovely contralto voice and fine diction, she was able to project herself through even the worst recording ... It would be true to say that in the three years she was recording most prolifically she hardly ever made a bad record".

== Aliases ==
McCoy recorded songs under various pseudonyms, including Amanda Brown (Columbia, Perfect and Pathe labels), Daisy Cliff (Guardsman label), Clara White or Bessie Williams (Oriole and Domino labels), Gladys White (Variety label), Fannie Johnson (Cameo) and Susan Williams (Lincoln label).
