= Order to View =

1938 British TV variety series

Order to View is an early television series which aired on the BBC for four episodes (two in 1938, two in 1939). A live variety show, those who appeared included Billy Milton, Edward Cooper, Sepha Treble, Ena Moon, Warren Jenkins, and Nadine March. It was written by Michael Treford. The time-slots it aired in ranged from 30 minutes to 45 minutes.

None of the episodes still exist, as methods to record live television had not been developed. A 6-minute fragment from the 1947 special Variety in Sepia is the oldest surviving telerecording of a BBC TV variety show.
