= Adelaide Hall =

American-British jazz singer and actor (1901–1993)

Background information
- Born: Adelaide Louise Hall; 20 October 1901; Brooklyn, New York City, U.S.
- Died: 7 November 1993 (aged 92) London, England
- Occupations: Singer; musician; actress; dancer; nightclub chanteuse
- Years active: 1921–1992
- Spouse: Bertram Hicks (m. 1924; died 1963)
- Musical career
- Genres: Jazz; swing; traditional pop; spirituals; musical theatre
- Instruments: Vocals; ukulele; acoustic guitar
- Labels: Victor; Columbia; Brunswick; CBS; Lucky; Decca; London

Adelaide Louise Hall (20 October 1901 – 7 November 1993) was an American-born UK-based jazz singer and entertainer. Her career spanned more than 70 years from 1921 until her death. Early in her career, she was a major figure in the Harlem Renaissance; she became based in the UK after 1938. Hall entered the Guinness Book of World Records in 2003 as the world's most enduring recording artist, having released material over eight consecutive decades. She performed with major artists such as Art Tatum, Ethel Waters, Josephine Baker, Louis Armstrong, Lena Horne, Bill "Bojangles" Robinson, Cab Calloway, Fela Sowande, Rudy Vallee, and Jools Holland, and recorded as a jazz singer with Duke Ellington (with whom she made her most famous recording, "Creole Love Call" in 1927) and with Fats Waller.

== Early life and marriage ==
Adelaide Hall was born in Brooklyn, New York City, United States, to Elizabeth and William Hall in 1901. Adelaide and her sister Evelyn attended the Pratt Institute, where William Hall taught piano. Her father died on March 23, 1917. Three years later, Evelyn died of pneumonia on March 25, 1920, leaving Adelaide to support herself and her mother.

In 1924, Hall married the British sailor Bertram Errol Hicks, who was born in Trinidad and Tobago. Soon after their marriage he opened a club in Harlem, New York, called "The Big Apple" and became her official business manager.

== American career 1921–1935 ==
Hall began her stage career in 1921 on Broadway in the chorus line of Noble Sissle's and Eubie Blake's musical Shuffle Along. Shuffle Along became a huge hit and propelled Hall's career. She went on to appear in a number of similar black musical shows, including Runnin' Wild on Broadway in 1923, in which she sang James P. Johnson's hit song "Old-Fashioned Love".

=== Chocolate Kiddies European tour, 1925 ===
In 1925, Hall toured Europe with the Chocolate Kiddies revue. The show included songs written by Duke Ellington. Hall was hired to join the cast of the Chocolate Kiddies revue in New York, where they rehearsed before setting sail for Europe. The initial tour started at Hamburg, Germany, on 17 May 1925, and ended in Paris, France, in December 1925, visiting many major cities in-between. The revue was designed to give Europeans a sampling of black entertainment from New York. Included in the cast were The Three Eddies, Lottie Gee, Rufus Greenlee and Thaddeus Drayton, Bobbie and Babe Goins, Charles Davis and Sam Wooding and his Orchestra. After the initial tour disbanded, Sam Wooding and his Orchestra continued touring the Chocolate Kiddies revue for several years later. During Hall's visit to Germany she also sang at Berlin's renowned transvestite club, the Eldorado Café. The venue is immortalised in Christopher Isherwood's 1939 novel Goodbye to Berlin, as well as in the 1972 film Cabaret and the musical of the same name.

In 1926, Hall appeared in the short-lived Broadway musical My Magnolia, which had a score written by Luckey Roberts and Alex C. Rogers, after which she appeared in Tan Town Topics with songs written by Fats Waller. Hall then starred in Desires of 1927 (with a score written by Andy Razaf and J. C. Johnson), which toured America from October 1926 through to September 1927.

=== Tan Town Topics, Small's Paradise and Desires of 1927 ===
In 1926, upon Hall's return to New York after touring Europe with the Chocolate Kiddies, she was featured in Tan Town Topics, a revue containing songs written by Fats Waller and Spencer Williams. The cast included Fats Waller, Eddie Rector and Ralph Cooper, Hall, Maude Mills, Arthur Gaines, Leondus Simmons and a dance troupe called the Tan Town Topics Vamps. The show opened at Harlem's Lafayette Theatre on 5 April followed by a short road tour on the eastern Theater Owners Booking Association (TOBA) circuit taking in Baltimore, Chicago and Philadelphia.

During July 1926, Hall appeared in residency with Lottie Gee and the Southern Syncopated Orchestra at Small's Paradise, New York. On Tuesday, 5 October, Hall appeared again at Small's Paradise at a special party, "Handy Night", hosted by the venue to honour W. C. Handy and to celebrate the release of his newly published book Blues: An Anthology—Complete Words and Music of 53 Great Songs. For entertainment, Hall, Lottie Gee, Maude White and Chic Collins provided a selection of jazz and blues numbers. From October 1926, Hall toured America playing the TOBA circuit until September 1927 in the highly praised show Desires of 1927, conceived by J. Homer Tutt and produced by impresario Irvin C. Miller. As the Pittsburgh Courier noted: "Adelaide Hall and assistants have some show. Speed, pretty girls, catchy music, a touch of art, which touches the border line of nudity – the names of such well-known stage celebrities as Adelaide Hall, J. Homer Tutt, Henry 'Gang' Jones, the Harmony Trio, Charles Hawkins, Arthur Porter, 'Billy' McKelvey and Clarence Nance." Billed as the star "soubrette" of the show, Hall's performance included several songs (most notably "Sweet Virginia Bliss"), flat-foot dancing and accompanying herself on the ukulele while singing.

As early as July 1927, newspapers were reporting that Hall had invented a new style of singing, which she termed 'squagel'. One account of the effect Hall had on audiences when she 'squageled' was written up in the Exhibitors Herald in August 1927.

=== Recordings with Duke Ellington ===
In New York in October 1927, Hall recorded her wordless vocals on "Creole Love Call" and "The Blues I Love To Sing" with Duke Ellington and his Orchestra, and on November 3, 1927, Hall recorded "Chicago Stomp Down" with Duke Ellington and The Chicago Footwarmers for Okeh Records. "Creole Love Call" became a worldwide hit and catapulted both Hall's and Ellington's careers into the mainstream. In 1927, Hall and Duke Ellington were touring in the same show, Dance Mania. The show played several large cities before reaching New York City. In mid-November, Hall travelled from Chicago (where she had been performing at the Sunset Café) to New York City in her Packard automobile with her husband Bert. When they arrived in New York, Hall was approached in 7th Avenue by a reporter, who enquired about her career plans. Hall and Ellington appeared together in Dance Mania at the Lafayette Theatre, Harlem, from 14 November for one week, before heading off with the show to play in Philadelphia, Pennsylvania, at the Standard Theatre. In Dance Mania, Hall closed the first half of the bill and Duke and his orchestra performed in the second half. Duke had a new number "Creole Love Call", which he included in his set. When Hall first heard the number back in October, she recounted:

I was standing in the wings behind the piano when Duke first played it ("Creole Love Call"). I started humming along with the band. He stopped the number and came over to me and said, "That's just what I was looking for. Can you do it again?" I said, "I can't, because I don't know what I was doing." He begged me to try. Anyway, I did, and sang this counter melody, and he was delighted and said "Addie, you're going to record this with the band." A couple of days later I did.

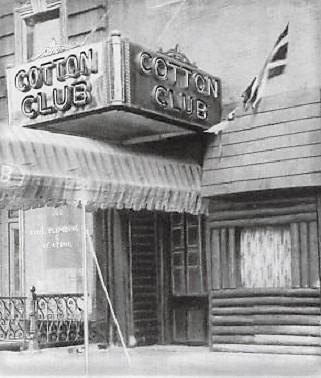
Cotton Club, Harlem, in 1930

When Duke was recounting the incident to a reporter he explained, "We had to do something to employ Adelaide Hall," and then added, "I always say we are primitive artists, we only employ the materials at hand ... the band is an accumulation of personalities, tonal devices." On 4 December 1927, Ellington and his Orchestra commenced their residency at Harlem's Cotton Club in a revue called Rhythmania. The show featured Hall singing "Creole Love Call". In 1928, "Creole Love Call" entered the Billboard song charts at No. 29 (USA). On 7 January 1933, Hall and Duke Ellington and his Famous Orchestra recorded "I Must Have That Man" and "Baby".

=== Blackbirds of 1928 ===
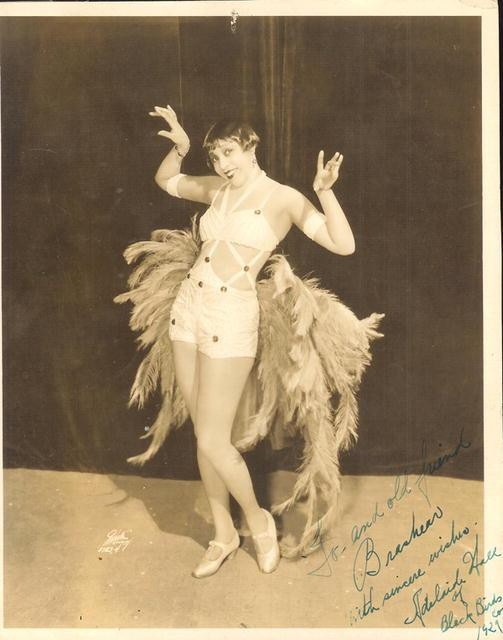
Hall in Blackbirds of 1928

In 1928, Hall starred on Broadway with Bill "Bojangles" Robinson, Tim Moore and Aida Ward in Blackbirds of 1928. The show became the most successful all-black show ever staged on Broadway at that time and made Hall and Bojangles into household names. Blackbirds of 1928 was the idea of impresario Lew Leslie, who planned to build the show around Florence Mills in New York after her success in the successful Blackbirds of 1926 revue in Paris and London, but Mills died of tuberculosis in 1927 before rehearsals commenced. Hall was chosen to replace her. The revue opened at Les Ambassadeurs Club in New York in January 1928, under the name Blackbird Revue, but it was renamed Blackbirds of 1928 and in May 1928 transferred to Broadway's Liberty Theatre, where it ran for 518 performances. After a slow start, the show became the hit of the season. Hall's performance of "Diga Diga Do", created a sensation. Her mother was so incensed when she went to see the show by her daughter performing what she termed 'risqué dance moves', she tried to stop the show during Hall's performance and banned her from appearing in any future performances. The ban only remained for one performance, and Hall returned triumphantly to her role the following day. It was reported in the press of the day that the show's producer Lew Leslie was so concerned about race violence connected with the controversy surrounding Hall's performance that he took out a hefty insurance policy to cover the cast; the most heavily insured were the principals, Hall and "Bojangles" Robinson.

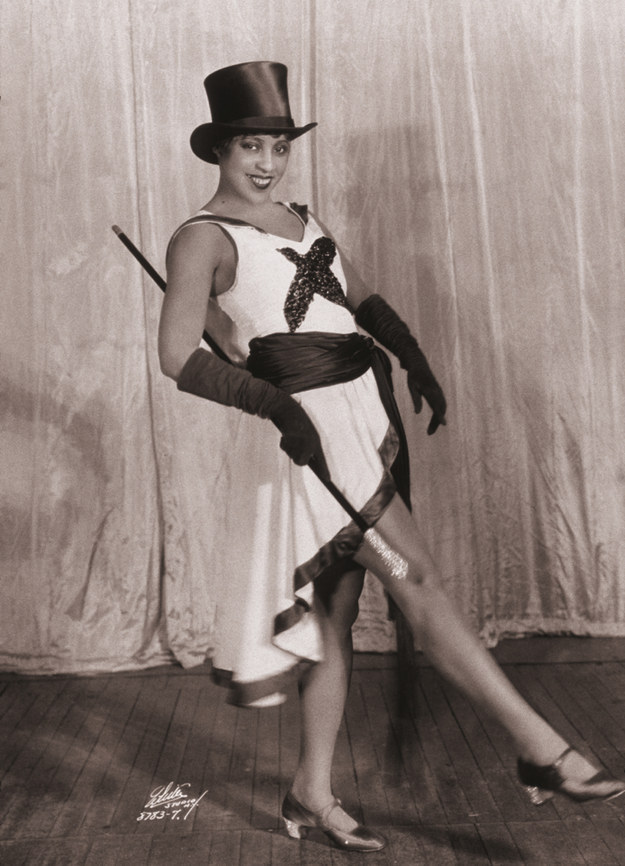
Hall in Blackbirds of 1928

It was this musical that not only secured Hall's success in the USA but also in Europe when the production was taken in 1929 to Paris, France, where it ran for four months at the Moulin Rouge. When Adelaide Hall arrived in Paris from America at the Gare Saint-Lazare she was greeted by a reception of fans and reporters that was reported to be as large as the reception Charlie Chaplin had received two years earlier when he visited Paris. The French artist Paul Colin illustrated several posters to advertise Blackbirds run at the Moulin Rouge including one entitled "Le Tumulte Noir – Dancer in Magenta" that captures Hall's performance beautifully, as she is dancing and waving her arms about. An original vintage poster of Hall by Paul Colin advertising Blackbirds at the Moulin Rouge sold on 2 October 2003 at Swann Auction Galleries in New York for $167,500. Another, similar vintage poster by Colin also advertising Blackbirds at the Moulin Rouge was sold by Christie's London Auction House in 2018. In Europe, Hall rivalled Josephine Baker for popularity on the European stage.

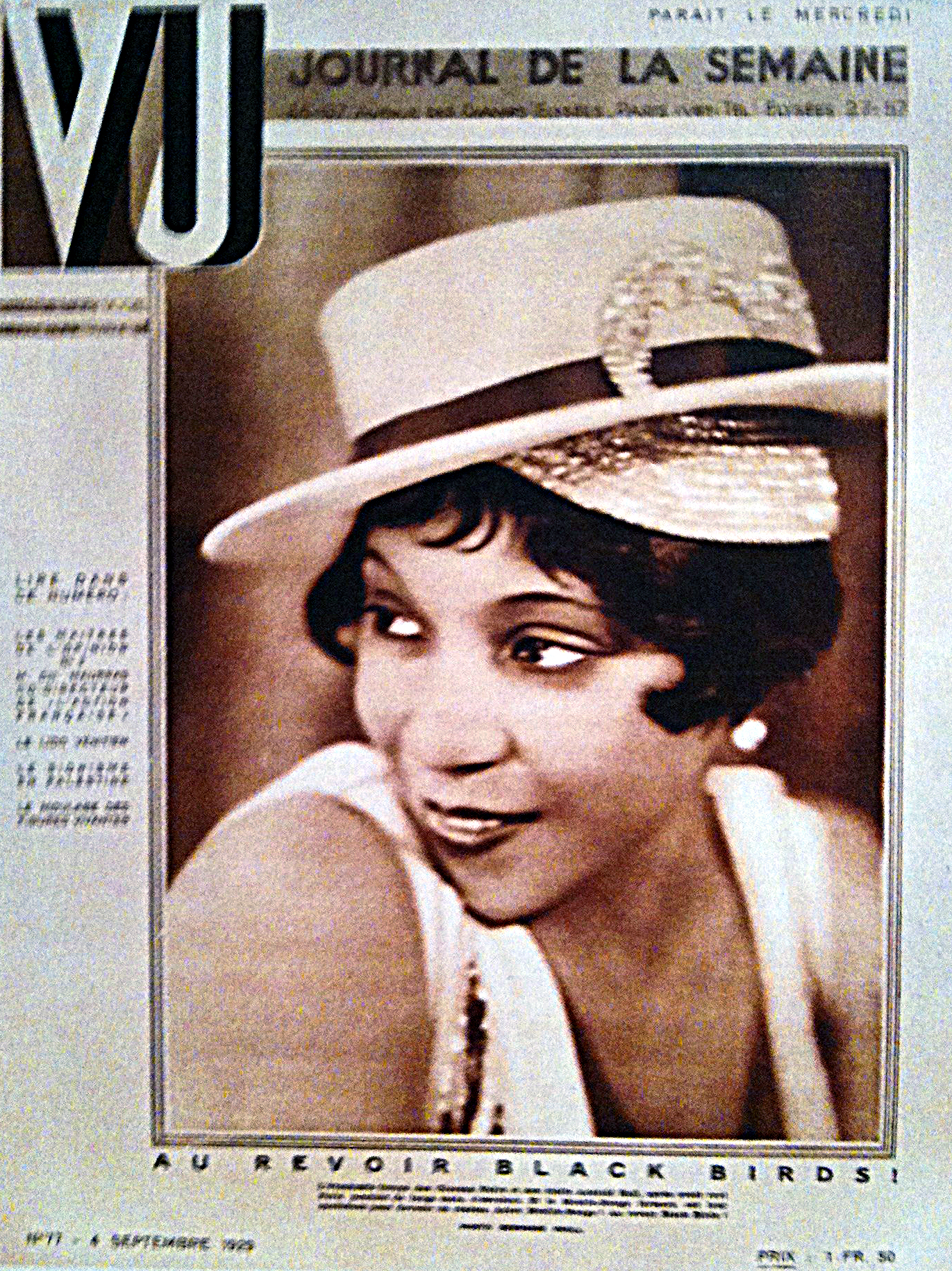
Cover of Vu, issue N°77, Wednesday, 4 September 1929, titled "Au revoir Black Birds!", with Hall saying farewell as star of Blackbirds at the Moulin Rouge, after a four-month production run

With Blackbirds' music score written by Jimmy McHugh and lyrics by Dorothy Fields, Hall's performances of the songs "I Can't Give You Anything but Love, Baby", "Diga Diga Do", "Bandanna Babies" and "I Must Have That Man" made them into household hits, and they continued to be audience favourites throughout her long career. At the end of Blackbirds' tenure at the Moulin Rouge, to thank the cast for their successful run and to welcome in the forthcoming Thanksgiving Day, Lew Leslie threw a big party held in the Paris suburb of Authie and, along with the cast, invited several cultural figures including the visual artist Man Ray, lyricist Ira Gershwin, writer James Joyce, German composer Kurt Weill, American composer William Grant Still and producer Clarence Robinson. A rare group photograph taken at the event, in which Hall is seated in the centre surrounded by guests including actress and music hall star Mistinguett, recently surfaced and was sold at Swann Auction Galleries, New York, for $2,640. The Blackbirds cast sailed from France back to the US in the fall of 1929 and upon their arrival almost immediately commenced a road tour of the States opening at the Adelphi Theatre, Chicago, on the evening of 26 November. It was in Chicago during December that Hall unexpectedly quit the production and hastened home to New York.

=== 1930: Brown Buddies ===
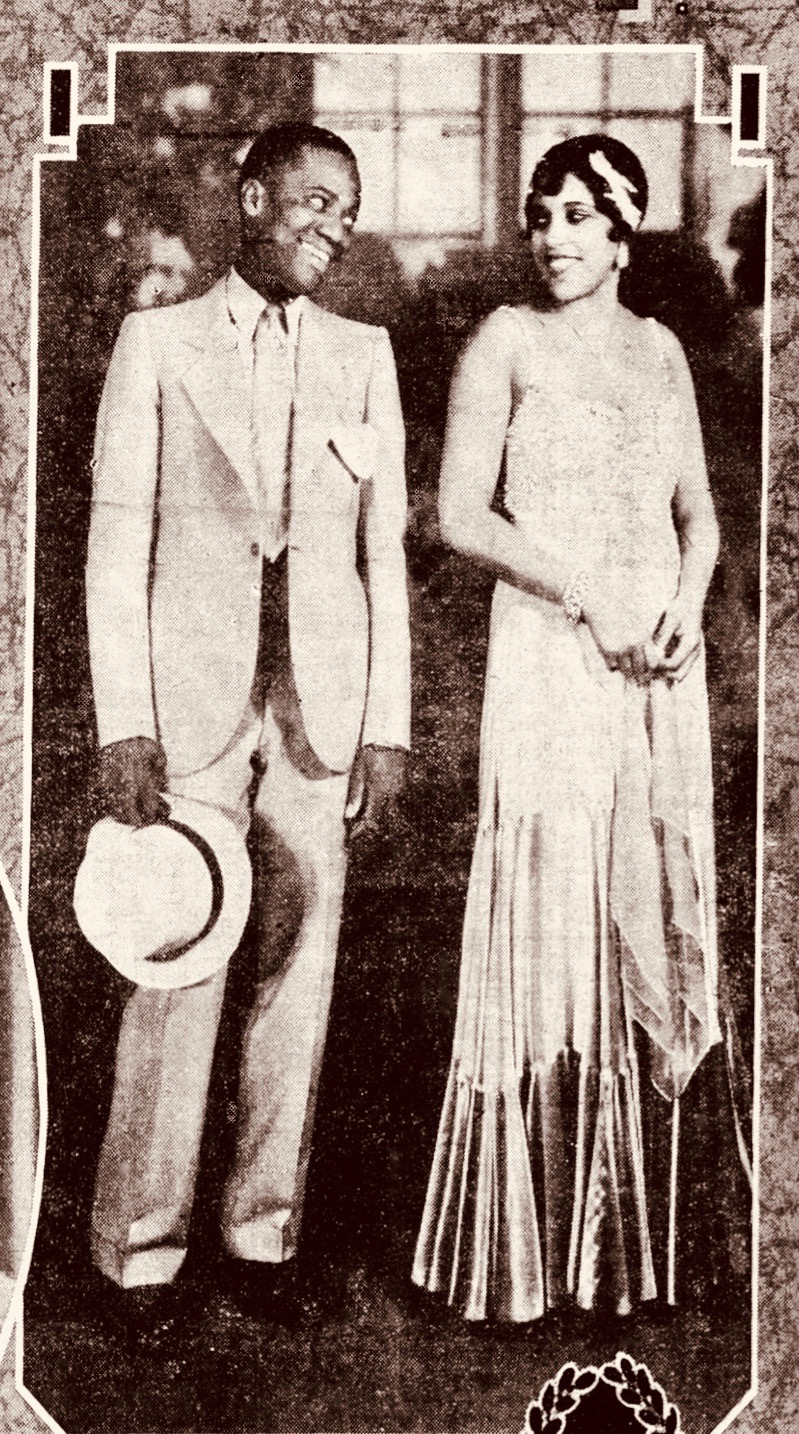
Bill "Bojangles" Robinson and Hall in the musical Brown Buddies on Broadway, 1930

Speculation that Hall and Bill "Bojangles" Robinson would be paired up on stage again after Hall quit Blackbirds at the end of 1929 had been rife among theatrical circles and in newspaper gossip columns. True to the speculation, in 1930, Hall and Bill "Bojangles" Robinson starred together twice at New York's Palace Theatre on Broadway (in February and in August). Both appearances were for a week's engagement. During Hall's February appearance, which was her first ever appearance at the Palace Theatre, she received a roaring welcome in front of a capacity house, and took six bows at the end of her performance. It was also noted in several newspapers that Lew Leslie had tried everything in his capacity bar from erecting a "Rock of Gibraltar" to prevent Hall from appearing at any venue without his consent since she quit Blackbirds. Having failed, Leslie did however manage to put a temporary restraint on her using any of the songs from Blackbirds in her show.

So successful was Hall's collaboration with Bojangles that in October 1930, the pair were teamed up together again, this time by Marty Forkins (Bojangles' manager) to star in the Broadway musical Brown Buddies. The musical opened on Broadway at the Liberty Theatre, where it ran for four months before commencing a road tour of the States. Dubbed by the press as "a musical comedy in sepia", the core of the music was composed by Millard Thomas but also featured songs by Shelton Brooks, Ned Reed, Porter Grainger, J. C. Johnson, J. Rosamund Johnson, George A. Little, Arthur Sizemore and Edward G. Nelson. After an out-of-town try-out, the musical opened on 7 October at the Liberty Theatre, New York, where it ran a fairly solid run of 111 performances until 10 January 1931.

=== 1931–1932: World concert tour ===
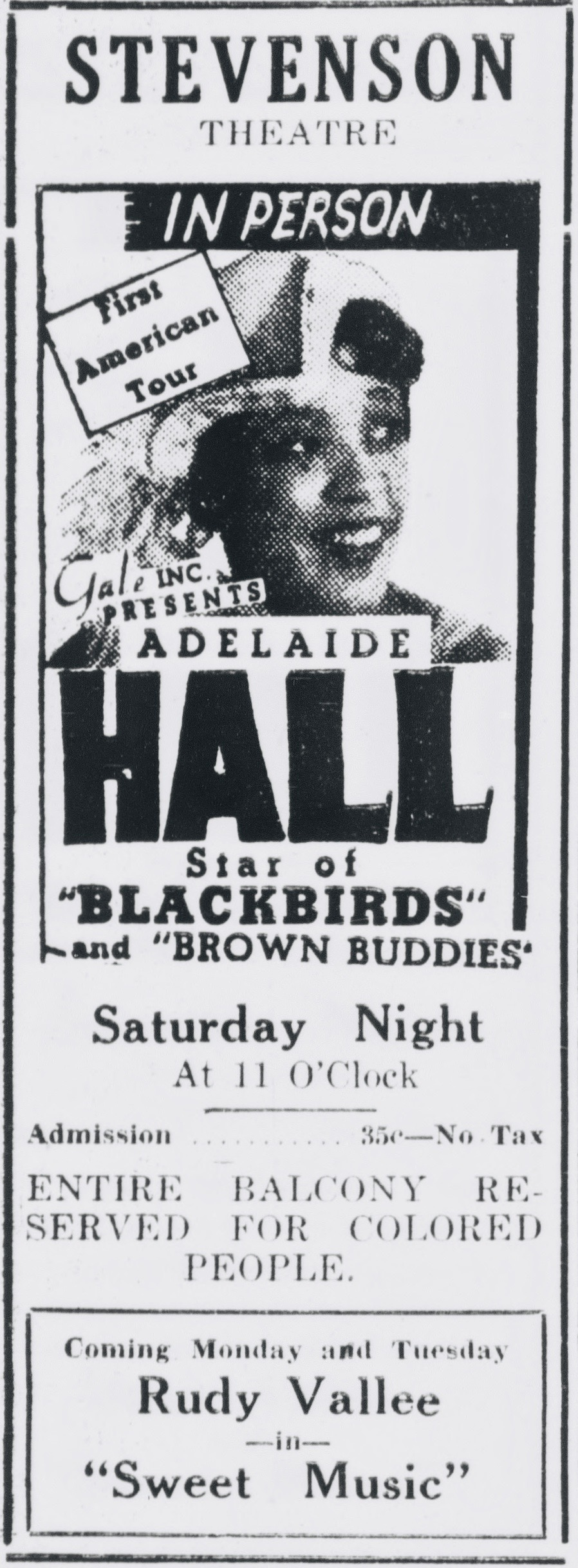
Hall's 1931–32 tour

In 1931, Hall embarked on a world concert tour that visited two continents (America and Europe). The tour was estimated to have performed to more than one million people. During the tour, she appeared four times at New York's Palace Theatre. She was accompanied on stage by two pianists who played white grand pianos. It was during this tour that Hall encountered and employed the blind pianist Art Tatum, whom she brought to New York with her at the end of the tour. In August 1932, Hall recorded "Strange as It Seems", "I'll Never Be the Same", "This Time It's Love" and "You Gave Me Everything but Love" using Art Tatum as one of her pianists on the recordings. In a review of her show at the Riverside Theatre, Milwaukee, on 25 January 1932 The Milwaukee Sentinel stated:

Adelaide Hall, attractive young colored singer, dominates a vaudeville of staggering proportions. Miss Hall has the sort of "blues" voice that gets you and she has a fine dramatic sense. Her interpretation of "River Stay Away From My Door," is strikingly good. And her gowns are lovely.

=== 1932–1933: Larchmont, Westchester County, racist incident ===
'If the objection to me is based on ancestry, I am perfectly willing to match my family tree with anybody here,' said Hall. 'As for being an American, I can trace my ancestry back to the Shinnecock Indians of Long Island, and I am proud of it. I'm a full-blooded American colored girl. If the issue is going to be ancestry I am only waiting for a chance when I can put some of these new rich on the witness stand and ask them how their grandfathers spelled their names.' Adelaide Hall quote, 1932.

In the fall of 1932, upon her return to New York, Hall and her husband purchased the lease on an exclusive freehold residential estate in the Village of Larchmont in the New York suburb of Westchester County. As news of her arrival in Larchmont leaked into the local media she began to encounter racial opposition from her white upper-middle-class neighbors, who threatened court action to have Hall evicted. After her home was broken into and an attempt was made to set it alight, news of the attack hit national newspaper headlines: "What's Your Grandfather's Name? Adelaide Hall Asks White Neighbors." Receiving hundreds of letters of support from the American public imploring her to stick it out, Hall stood her ground and in a press statement she issued insisted that she was a true American citizen as her ancestry could be traced back to the Shinnecock Indian tribe of Long Island and as such she had every right to reside where she wished.

=== 1933: Harlem Opera House, New York ===
For one week commencing Saturday 14 January 1933, Hall returned to New York to appear in a music revue produced by Leonard Harper at the Harlem Opera House. A journalist from the Pittsburgh Courier newspaper who published under the initials T.Y. wrote in his review of Hall's performance that "she was excellent" and that he was so thrilled to be at the show he totally forgot to jot down on his notepad the title of the songs Hall performed. He did however apologise for this mishap. He also mentioned that Hall was accompanied on stage by a guitar "troubadour" and a blind pianist (referring to Art Tatum) who, he declared, "can really play".

=== 1933: American concert tour ===
ADELAIDE HALL TO TOUR THE COAST

— Pittsburgh Courier headline, 22 July 1933

Hall's itinerary included all the principal cities and lasted 30 weeks

=== World Fair City, Chicago, 1933 ===
Miss Adelaide Hall Captures The World Fair City and They Like It

— Pittsburgh Courier, 19 August 1933:

Miss Adelaide Hall, the darling girl with the guitar and the mellifluent voice, again stole into the callous hearts of an analytical public at the Regal theater last week. She charmed them with her voice, her poise and beauty. She has a style of singing 'Stormy Weather' all her own. Chicago belonged to Adelaide for one whole week. And her majesty reigned supreme.

On 19 August 1933, the fifth annual Bud Billiken Parade and Picnic took place during the prestigious Chicago World Fair. African Americans came out in droves to support the event held by the Chicago Defender local newspaper. The Chicago Defender had named the event after a weekly column in its children's section written by Willard Motley. Billiken became a symbol of pride, happiness and hope for African-American youth. After the famous parade (the largest to date) a huge free picnic event was held in Washington Park that included games, music, entertainment, dancing and ice cream. Performing in concert at the event in front of an estimated 50,000 people was the parade's guest of honour Adelaide Hall. Also appearing at the event were Cab Calloway, Earl Hines and The Sioux Tribe of Native Americans.

=== Stormy Weather Revue, 1933 ===
A Pittsburgh Courier review of the Stormy Weather Revue, starring Hall in New York, dated 29 November 1933, said that, "Although crippled from a fall into a manhole while appearing in Boston the week previous to her New York engagement, Adelaide Hall, scintillating star of the Stormy Weather Revue, limps across the stage ahead of an array of stars, which go far to label this revue, about the finest to grace the boards of any stage." In October 1933, for the first time in history, the entire floor revue from Harlem's Cotton Club went on tour, playing theatres in principal cities across the U.S. Irving Mills organised the tour and Hall headlined the cast. Other performers on the bill included the Mills Blue Rhythm Band and George Dewey Washington. The revue was originally called The Cotton Club Parade of 1933, but for the road tour its name was changed to the Stormy Weather Revue. As this name implies, the show contained the hit song "Stormy Weather", written by Harold Arlen and Ted Koehler, which had been introduced by Ethel Waters earlier that year at the Cotton Club in the Cotton Club Parade of 1933.

=== 1934: Apollo Theater, Harlem, Chocolate Soldiers revue ===
Chocolate Soldiers opened at the new Apollo Theater, Harlem, starring Hall in Harlem, New York, 14 February 1934. The show was produced by Clarence Robinson and garnered great attention and acclaim, helping to establish the recently opened Apollo as Harlem's premier theatre.

=== The Cotton Club Parade, 1934 ===
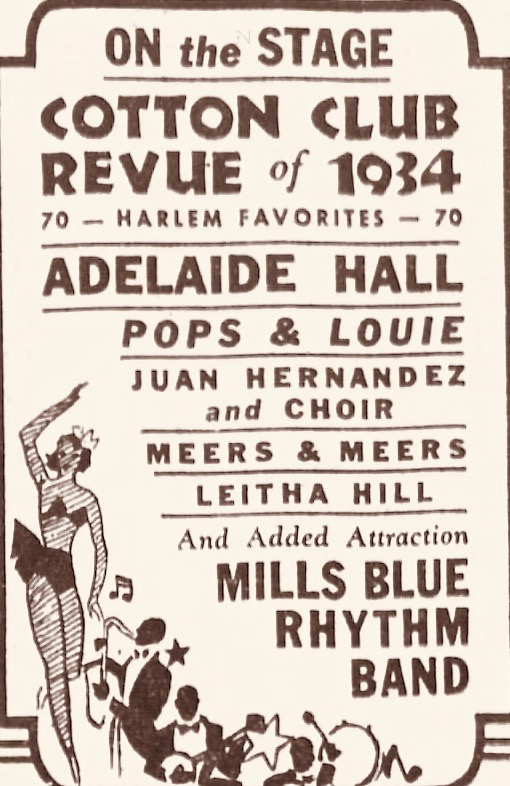
Advertisement for Hall in the Cotton Club Revue of 1934 at Loew's Metropolitan Theatre, Brooklyn, from 7 September 1934

On 23 March 1934, Hall opened at Harlem's Cotton Club in The Cotton Club Parade 24th Edition. It was the largest grossing show ever staged there. The show ran for six months at the Cotton Club. In the show, Hall introduced the songs "Ill Wind" and "Primitive Prima Donna", which Harold Arlen and Ted Koehler wrote especially for her. It was during Hall's rendition of "Ill Wind" that nitrogen smoke was used to cover the floor of the stage. It was the first time such an effect had ever been used on a stage and caused a sensation. So successful was the show that the entire production went on a road tour, playing in theatres across America.

In the 1930s, several Hollywood movie companies also maintained studios in New York, and New York-based stage performers were approached to appear in movie short subjects. Hall starred in two: On the Air and Off (1933) for Universal, and An All-Colored Vaudeville Show (1935), a miniature revue for Vitaphone, co-starring The Nicholas Brothers.

=== 1935: North and South American concert tour ===
During 1935, Hall performed another coast-to-coast American/Canadian concert tour that took in the South. Prior to the tour commencing she gave an interview (during her visit to Dixie), conducted by the journalist George Tyler that was published on 16 March 1935 in The Afro-American newspaper. In the interview Hall gives a rare insight into her life and her home in the Village of Larchmont, disclosing how dramatically her circumstances had changed since her humble upbringing in Harlem.

"Much has been said and published too, about the magnificent residence of Miss Hall," says George, "but my interest was in what transpires behind the portals of this mansion when the singer is at home." "I have a sun parlour," said Adelaide, "in which I take a keen delight. Here, while enjoying the rays of the sun, I crochet and listen to the radio. A great deal of my time off the stage I spend painting or working in my garden. My favorite radio artists are Mildred Bailey, Willard Robison and his Deep River Orchestra, and the Southernaires. My stage favorites include Bill Robinson, Ethel Waters and Ada Brown. While at home I do very little cooking; in fact, there are servants to take care of these details. The cook's biggest job is to prepare broiled chicken, as that is one of my favorite dishes."

Tyler adds that the singing star owns and drives her car, roller skates, swims, plays tennis and enjoys horseback riding.

"When I retire from public life I shall resume my career as a modiste," confided Miss Hall. "As a kid I longed for a stage career, and my first step towards this was to run away from school to try my luck behind the footlights. I was apprehended and sent back to school to continue my training as a modiste. Today, I am proud that I am more than an actress".

Tyler continues by asking about her forthcoming American and Canadian concert tour, which will take her deep into the South: "What do you think of such a tour, under the conditions that exist in the South?" Hall replied:

My experience of a couple of years ago while on a coast-to-coast tour should serve me well. Being a member of the oppressed race, I think I will be able to accustom myself to conditions, as they exist. However, there are many details I would rather not go into.

In the summer of 1935, Miss Hall had a regular slot on the New York radio station WNCA performing every Monday and Wednesday evening at 9 PM (New York time).

== European career, 1935–1938 ==
Hall arrived in Paris, France in the fall of 1935 and remained living there until 1938. Her husband Bert opened a nightclub for her in Paris, situated at 73 rue Pigalle in Montmartre, called La Grosse Pomme (French for "The Big Apple", the name of his original New York club) where she frequently entertained. "It (the club) held about two hundred people. I made this dramatic entrance coming down a spiral staircase from the attic. Nobody knew that all the boxes of wine and tinned food were stored up there with me. I came down the stairs in the most gorgeous costumes you'll ever see, floating in feathers and plumes," recalled Hall during an interview.

The Quintette du Hot Club de France were one of the house bands Hall's husband Bert hired at the club. At the beginning of 1936, Hall starred in the Black and White Revue. The show of 50 performers opened in Paris, France and in February the production travelled to Switzerland for a tour. The revue was produced by Ralph Clayton, staged by Arthur Bradley and choreographed by ballet master Albert Gaubier who had danced under the direction of Serge Diaghilev in the Russian company Ballets Russes. The orchestra that travelled with the production was under the direction of Henry Crowder. During the August 1936 Summer Olympics held in Berlin, Germany, Hall appeared at Berlin's Rex Theatre singing jazz. Her performance is notable for her contravening Adolf Hitler's ban on jazz music being played.

In 1937, Hall choreographed her own take on the famous French dance the Can-can; she called it the Canned Apple and would perform it at her Montmartre nightclub La Grosse Pomme. Hall is also credited with introducing the Truckin' dance craze to the Parisians. During her residence in Europe, Hall sang with several orchestras, including those of Willie Lewis and Ray Ventura; in 1937 (while on a trip to Copenhagen), she recorded four songs with Kai Ewans and his Orchestra for the Tono record label. On 13 May 1938, BBC Radio broadcast Over to Paris, an hour-long programme direct from a Paris studio that highlighted a variety of famous Parisian artists of radio, cabaret and the music hall. The show included performances from Hall and Mistinguett, who were accompanied by two orchestras.

== Move to London, 1938 ==
=== British career, 1938–1993 ===
After many years performing in the US and Europe, Hall went to the United Kingdom in 1938 to take a starring role in a stage-adapted musical version of Edgar Wallace's The Sun Never Sets at the Theatre Royal, Drury Lane. She was so successful and became so popular with British audiences that she stayed and made her home there, becoming one of the most popular singers and entertainers of the time. Hall lived in London from 1938 until her death.

On 28 August 1938, Hall recorded "I Can't Give You Anything But Love" and "That Old Feeling" at London's Abbey Road Studios, with Fats Waller accompanying her on the organ. The recordings were released on His Master's Voice. On 10 September 1938, she appeared in Broadcast To America with Waller at London's St George's Hall in a live transatlantic radio broadcast.

On 25 February 1939, BBC TV broadcast Harlem in Mayfair from Hall's London nightclub, the Old Florida Club. The cabaret show starred Hall; also on the bill were Esther and Louise, Eddie Lewis, and Fela Sowande with his Negro Choir and Orchestra. On 20 May 1939, BBC TV broadcast the cabaret show Dark Sophistication, starring Hall performing at the Old Florida Club. On 26 August 1939, Hall took part in the BBC TV production Kentucky Minstrels, which was transmitted live from the 2500-seat RadiOlympia Theatre in London.

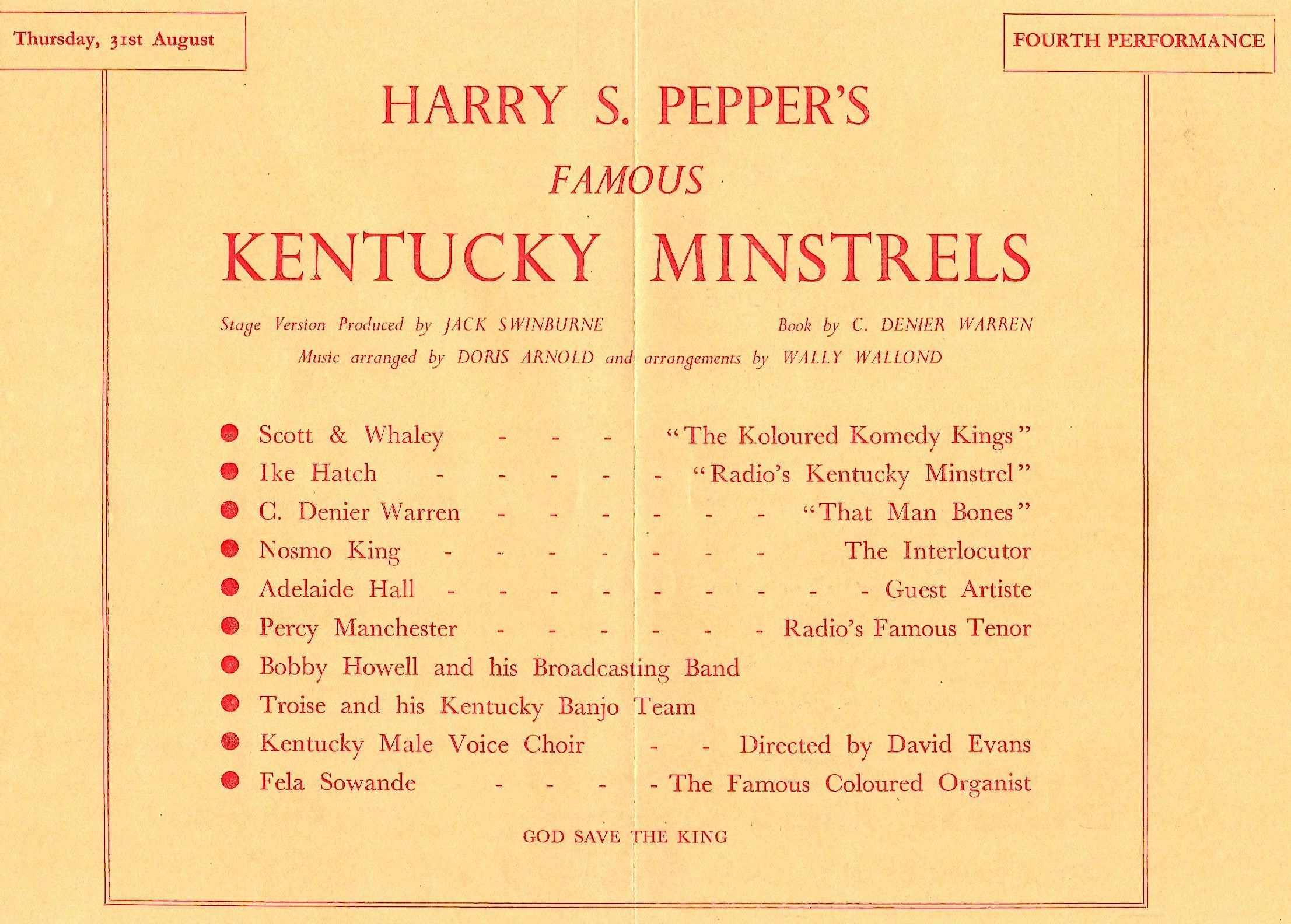
Radiolympia, Thursday 31 August 1939, Kentucky Minstrels starring Adelaide Hall

On Friday, 1 September 1939, Hall was scheduled to appear at 9:00 pm in a live BBC TV broadcast titled Variety recorded direct from the RadiOlympia Theatre. Other performers on the bill included Nosmo King, The Gordon RadiOlympia Girls, Hubert Murray and Mooney, and Bobby Howell and his Band. However, with war looming, the BBC were instructed by the government to shut down broadcasting, and at 12:35 the service went off the air for seven years. It appears that the show Variety never took place at RadiOlympia; The Times newspaper for the following day (2 September) noted in their section 'News in Brief' that "RadiOlympia closed at 12:30 yesterday", presumably another result of the country being placed on a war footing.

Unexpectedly, the show Variety became one of the first British theatrical casualties of World War II and part of the mystery surrounding "what really happened at the BBC on 1 September 1939?" That year, Hall became a featured vocalist with Joe Loss & His Band and from 1939 to 1941, Hall headlined the popular BBC Radio variety show Piccadixie. She also toured the UK extensively during these years, headlining the Piccadixie British Tour, supported by comedian Oliver Wakefield and pianist George Elrick.

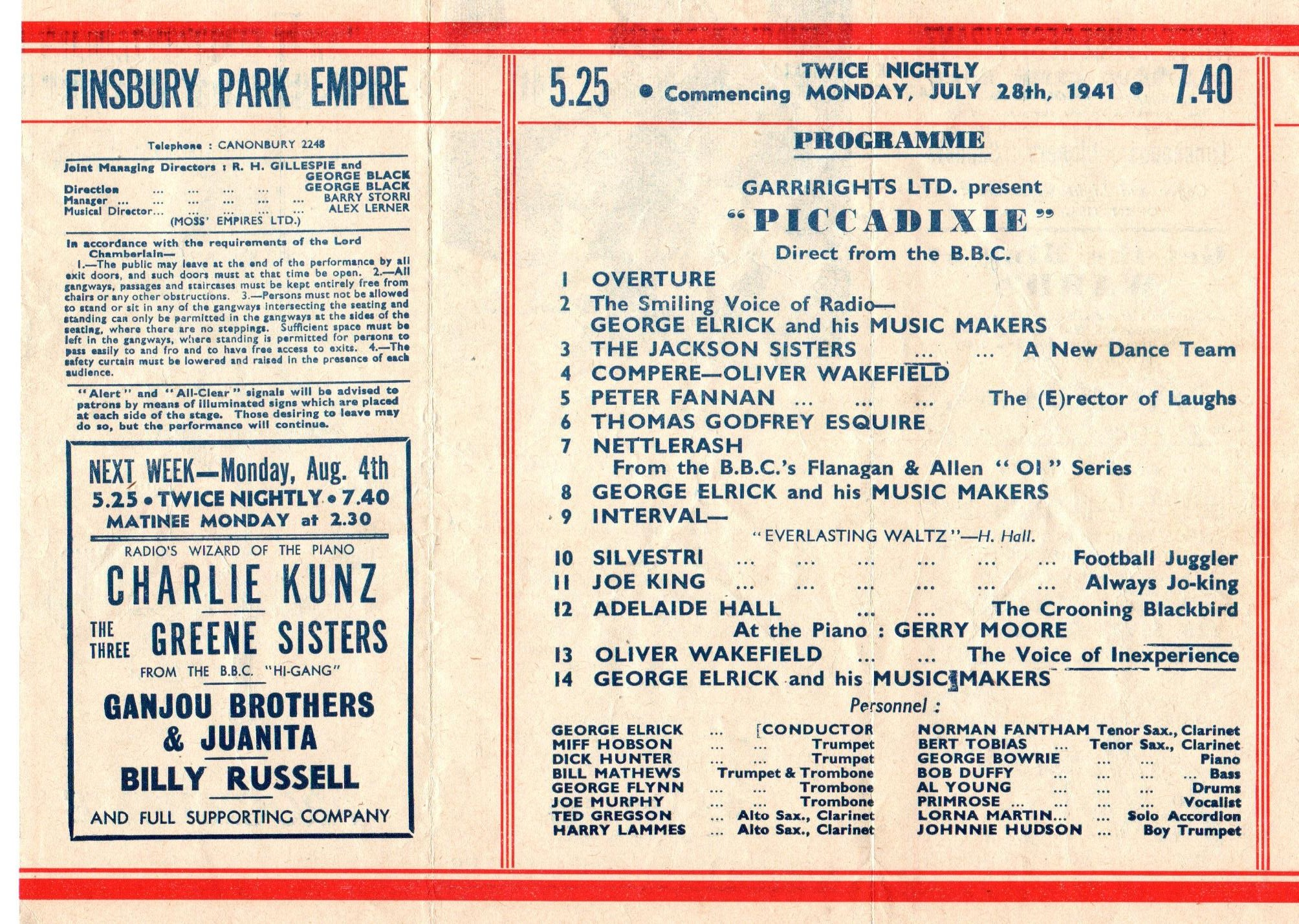
Hall starring in Piccadixie at the Finsbury Park Empire, London, 28 July 1941 (detail from the original programme)

During the war, Hall entertained the troops in Europe for the USO (United Service Organizations Inc.) and the British equivalent ENSA (Entertainments National Service Association) in which she served as a captain. Her uniform was made by Madam Adele of Grosvenor Street in Mayfair, London.

The First World Radio Broadcast, 17 October 1939.

On 17 October 1939 Adelaide Hall starred in one of the most sensational live radio broadcasts ever attempted by the BBC to hit the airwaves. It took place at the RAF Hendon base in North London, in front of a specially invited audience of RAF personnel, and was the first large-scale variety concert organised by ENSA. The whole show was relayed worldwide across the airwaves, the first time a live show had ever been broadcast by the BBC around the globe. On the bill was Hall, her accompanist Fela Sowande, Mantovani and His Orchestra, The Western Brothers, and Harry Roy and his Band.

Hall later recalled in vivid detail the challenges she faced during WWII while entertaining the troops across Europe and in the UK, some of whom were wounded: "Sometimes I had to sing without music, but it was a challenge, and so rewarding to get all the people to sing with me." At one London performance Hall gave at Lewisham Hippodrome theatre during the week of 20 August 1940, the Luftwaffe attacked overhead, dropping bombs and, "even though we could hear bombs exploding outside the theatre, we carried on ... I had sung 54 songs until the all-clear sounded at 3:45 a.m. in the morning!" Hall's 54 encores are believed to be a world record for the amount of encores sung by one artist on stage. Hall also claimed to be one of the first entertainers to enter Germany before the war had officially ended. She travelled with the troops as they advanced towards Berlin, dismissing the dangers such bravery entailed.

Hall's career was almost an uninterrupted success. She made more than 70 records for Decca, had her own BBC Radio series, Wrapped in Velvet (making her the first black artist to have a long-term contract with the BBC), and appeared on the stage, in films, and in nightclubs (of which she owned her own in New York, London and Paris). In the 1940s, and especially during World War II, she was hugely popular with civilian and ENSA audiences and became one of Britain's highest paid entertainers. Her London nightclub The Old Florida Club owned by Hall and her husband was destroyed by a landmine during an air raid in 1939. Her husband Bert was in the club's cellar when the landmine exploded but he survived the attack. Hall has a cameo appearance as a singer in the 1940 Oscar-winning movie The Thief of Bagdad (directed by Michael Powell (and others) and produced by Alexander Korda) in which she sings Lullaby of the Princess, written by Miklós Rózsa. In 1943, Hall featured in an ENSA radio show broadcast by the BBC entitled Spotlight on the Stars during which she was accompanied by the BBC Variety Orchestra. During the show she mentions how she had just returned home from a tour. On 20 May 1940, Hall's recording of 'Careless' debuted in the British charts at number 30, where it remained for two consecutive weeks. In the August 1940 issue of British Vogue magazine, a photograph of Hall appears on the 'Spotlight' page compiled by the features editor Lesley Blanch under the caption: "Adelaide Hall and her husband run the Florida. His show, her songs, our fun." On 6 June 1945, Hall's recording of "There Goes That Song Again" entered the BBC British charts at number 15.

Hall appears in the earliest post-war BBC telerecording: a live recording of her performance at RadiOlympia Theatre on 7 October 1947. The footage was filmed on the "Cafe Continental" stage set at the theatre for a BBC TV show titled Variety in Sepia. Hall sings "Chi-Baba, Chi-Baba (My Bambino Go to Sleep)" and "I Can't Give You Anything But Love" and accompanies herself on ukulele and dancing. When the show was broadcast on BBC TV it was 60 minutes in length and included performances from Winifred Atwell, Evelyn Dove, Cyril Blake and his Calypso Band, Edric Connor and Mable Lee and was produced by Eric Fawcett. The six-minute footage of Hall is all that survives of the show. In 1948, Hall appeared in a British movie called A World is Turning. The movie was intended to highlight the contribution of black men and women to British society at a time when they were struggling for visibility on the screens. Filming appears to have been halted due to the director's illness and only six reels of rushes remain, including scenes of Hall rehearsing songs such as "Swing Low, Sweet Chariot" and "The Gospel Train" (a traditional African-American spiritual first published in 1872 as one of the songs of the Fisk Jubilee Singers). In 1949, Hall appeared on the BBC TV shows Rooftop Rendezvous and Caribbean Carnival. That year, Hall recorded five spirituals accompanied by the pianist Kenneth Cantril. The five songs chosen and released by London Records (the US outlet for British Decca) were "Swing Low Sweet Chariot", "Bye and Bye", "Nobody Know De Trouble I've Seen", "Sometimes I Feel Like a Motherless Child", and "Deep River".

In 1951, Hall appeared as a guest in the music spot on the first ever British comedy series How Do You View, starring Terry-Thomas and written by Sid Colin and Talbot Rothwell. On 29 October 1951, Hall appeared on the bill of the Royal Variety Performance at the Victoria Palace Theatre in the presence of Princess Elizabeth and Princess Margaret. Alongside Trinidad-born US dancer Pearl Primus and the female members of her company, who also performed that year, Hall was the first black female artiste to ever take part in the Royal Variety Performance. Hall also entertained at private parties for the Duchess of Kent, the Churchills, and the Duke and Duchess of Windsor. She was one of the many performers at an all-star midnight Anglo-American gala at the London Coliseum on the night of Monday, 11 December 1951, before the then Princess Elizabeth and the Duke of Edinburgh. Also on the bill was Frank Sinatra, Orson Welles, and Noël Coward.

In the early 1950s, Hall and her husband Bert opened the Calypso Club in Regent Street, London, and Royalty flocked there. It was reported in the press that Princess Elizabeth was a frequent visitor and that Hall had taught the princess the Charleston.

Hall appeared in the 1951 London run of Kiss Me, Kate playing the role of Hattie, singing Cole Porter's "Another Op'nin', Another Show", and in the 1952 London musical Love From Judy at the Saville Theatre playing the role of Butterfly, singing "A Touch of Voodoo", "Kind to Animals" and "Ain't Gonna Marry". The entire production of Love From Judy was filmed with the original cast and aired on BBC on 16 March 1953. In 1956, she returned to London's West End in the play Someone to Talk To. In 1957, at the request of Lena Horne, Hall returned to America to appear with Horne in the musical Jamaica. The world premiere of Jamaica took place in Philadelphia in September 1957 and transferred to Broadway on 31 October. In 1958, Hall was cast as one of the lead characters in Rodgers and Hammerstein's new musical Flower Drum Song.

On 1 April 1960, Hall appeared on the BBC TV music show The Music Goes Round hosted by John Watt. The show was an NBA TV version of the radio show Songs from the Shows. On 3 March 1965, Hall appeared on BBC2 television in Muses with Milligan with Spike Milligan and John Betjeman in a show devoted to poetry and jazz. In 1968, Hall appeared in Janie Jones, a new American play written by Robert P. Hillier and directed by Peter Cotes. The cast included American actress Marlene Warfield. The play had its world premiere on 8 July at the Manchester Opera House, where it ran for one week prior to its London West End opening on 15 July at the New Theatre (now the Noël Coward Theatre).

Between 1969 and 1970, Hall made two jazz recordings with Humphrey Lyttelton. This was followed by theatre tours and concert appearances; she sang at Duke Ellington's memorial service at St Martin-in-the-Fields in 1974. On 4 January 1974, she appeared on the British TV shows Looks Familiar (as a panelist) and on What Is Jazz, with Humphrey Lyttelton. On 15 June 1976, she appeared on British TV in It Don't Mean a Thing. and in 1981 appeared on the Michael Parkinson BBC TV show Parkinson as a guest. In July 1982, Hall appeared at a Gala concert held at St Paul's Cathedral in London to celebrate the sacred music of Duke Ellington. A live recording of the concert titled The Sacred Music of Duke Ellington was filmed for a Channel 4 TV documentary. Artists also taking part included Tony Bennett, Phyllis Hyman, Jacques Loussier, Alan Downey, Wayne Sleep, Ronnie Scott, Stan Tracey and the New Swingle Singers. The concert was hosted by Rod Steiger and narrated by Douglas Fairbanks Jr.

In April 1980, Hall returned to the U.S. and from 1 to 24 May, she appeared in the cast of Black Broadway (a retrospective musical revue) at the Town Hall in New York. Among other artists appearing in the show were Elisabeth Welch, Gregory Hines, Bobby Short, Honi Coles, Edith Wilson, Nell Carter and John W. Bubbles of Buck and Bubbles fame. The show originally was staged at the Newport Jazz Festival on 24 June 1979, before it was re-assembled in 1980 and staged at the Town Hall. Following Black Broadway, in June 1980, Hall took up temporary residence at Michael's Pub in New York and commenced a three-week engagement, performing three shows a night. In June 1980, she performed at the Playboy Jazz Festival held at the Hollywood Bowl in Los Angeles. Other artists on the bill included Dizzy Gillespie, Herbie Hancock, Stéphane Grappelli, Mel Tormé, Zoot Sims, Carmen McRae and Chick Corea. On 2 July 1980, writer Rosetta Reitz organised a tribute to the Women of Jazz at Avery Fisher Hall as part of the Newport Jazz Festival. Called The Blues is a Woman, the program, narrated by Carmen McRae, featured music by Hall, Big Mama Thornton, Nell Carter and Koko Taylor. Hall appeared at the Duke Ellington Tribute Concert at St. Paul's Cathedral, London, in 1982, where she sang Ellington's 'Come Sunday'. Back in the States, in February 1983, Hall appeared on the bill of the 100th birthday celebration for composer Eubie Blake held at the Shubert Theater, New York. Blake was recovering from pneumonia at the time, so could not attend the event; but with the aid of a special telephone hook-up to his home in Brooklyn he was able to listen to the entire two-hour show. On 5 April 1983, Hall commenced a month-long engagement at The Cookery in New York. Her accompanists were Ronnie Whyte and Frank Tate.

In 1985, Hall appeared on British TV in the cast of Omnibus: The Cotton Club comes to the Ritz, a 60-minute BBC documentary in which some of the performers from Harlem's Cotton Club were filmed performing at the Ritz Hotel in London, along with contemporary musicians. Also on the bill were Cab Calloway and his Orchestra, Doc Cheatham, Max Roach and the Nicholas Brothers. In 1985, Hall appeared on British TV on The South Bank Show in a documentary entitled The Real Cotton Club. In July 1986, Hall performed in concert at the Barbican Centre, London.

In October 1988, Hall presented a one-woman show at Carnegie Hall in New York. She presented the same show in London at the King's Head Theatre (Islington) during December 1988. She is one of the very few performers to have made two guest appearances (2 December 1972 and 13 January 1991) on the BBC Radio 4 programme Desert Island Discs. In 1989, she appeared at London's Royal Festival Hall at the Royal Ellington Tribute Concert that included the world premiere of Ellington's Queen's Suite, which was written for Queen Elizabeth II. Other artists appearing included the Bob Wilber Band, Tony Coe and Alan Cohen. The concert was filmed by Independent Film Production Associates. 1989 also saw Hall appear in concert at the Studio Theatre, Haymarket in Leicester. The concert was organised by composer/musician Gavin Bryars and sold out almost as soon as it was announced.

In 1990, Hall starred in Sophisticated Lady, a Channel 4 television documentary about her life broadcast on 24 July, which included a performance of her in concert recorded live at the Riverside Studios in London. Her final US concert appearances took place in 1992 at Carnegie Hall, in the Cabaret Comes to Carnegie series. The same year, she was presented with a Gold Badge Award from the British Academy of Songwriters, Composers and Authors. After attending the award ceremony she said: "I was so proud to be acknowledged. They said, 'You look like a Queen. You don't look more than fifty or sixty. You look so well.' I wore a sequin suit – different colours – it glittered. I must have been the oldest one there! I ate everything that came along."

== Death ==
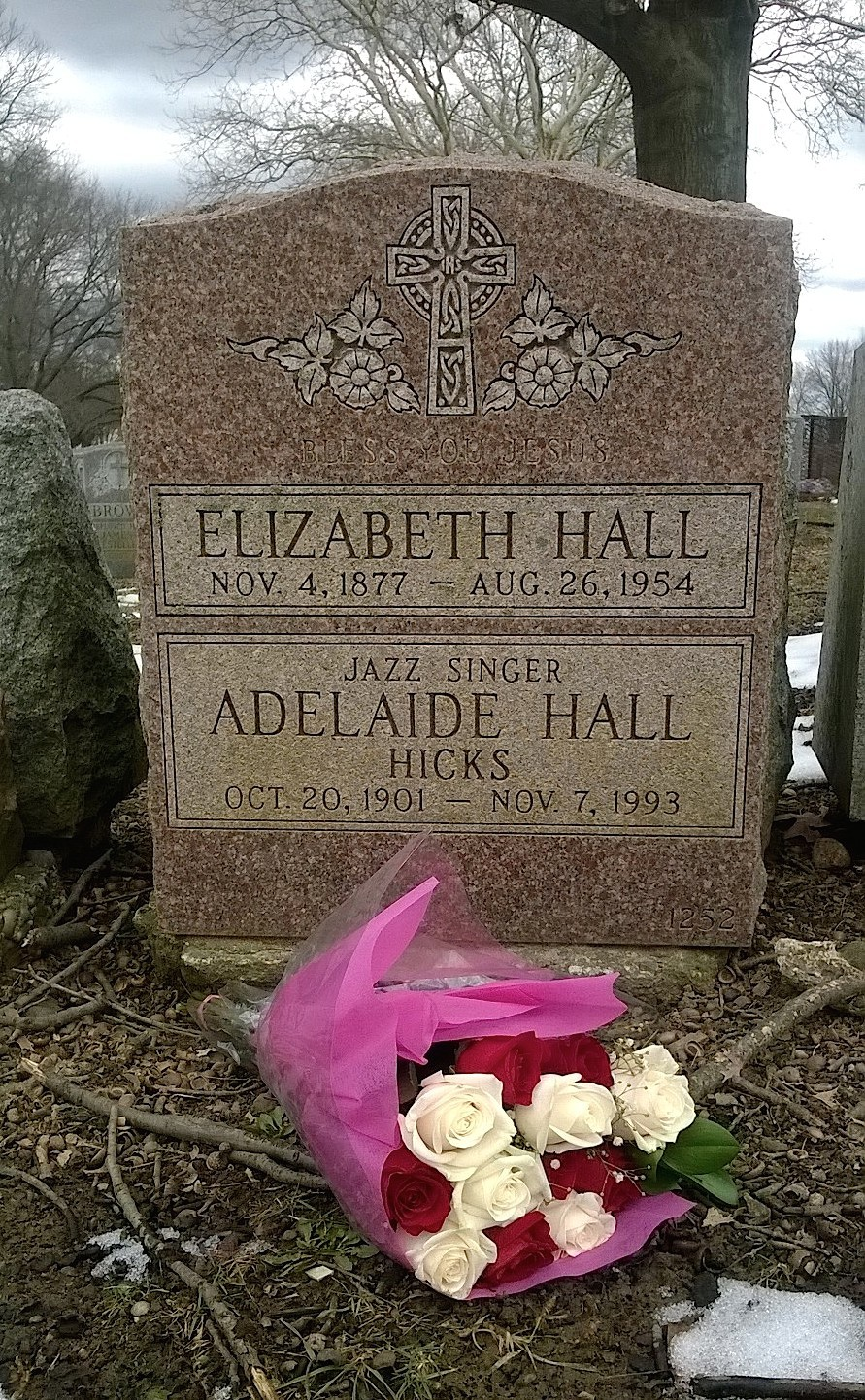
Hall's grave at Cemetery of the Evergreens in Brooklyn, New York, Terrace Hill Section, Grave 1252, March 2018

Adelaide Hall died in the early hours of 7 November 1993, aged 92, at London's Charing Cross Hospital of natural causes (old age). Honouring her wish, her funeral took place in New York at the Cathedral of the Incarnation (Garden City, New York) and she was laid to rest beside her mother at the Cemetery of the Evergreens in Brooklyn.

In London, a memorial service was held for her at St Paul's, Covent Garden (known as the "actors' church"), which was attended by many stars including Elaine Paige, Elisabeth Welch, Lon Satton and Elaine Delmar. One of the participants, TV presenter and broadcaster Michael Parkinson, remarked during his eulogy: "Adelaide lived to be ninety-two and never grew old."

== Legacy ==
In 2018, Hall was named by the Evening Standard on a list of 14 "Inspirational black British women throughout history".

Chapter 20 (titled "La Grosse Pomme") in the 2017 spy novel I Spy the Wolf by Stephen Davis is set inside Adelaide Hall's La Grosse Pomme nightclub in Pigalle, Paris, during March 1939.

Hall was one of the major entertainers of the Harlem Renaissance. Along with Louis Armstrong, she pioneered scat singing and is widely acknowledged as one of the world's first jazz singers, regarded as such by Ella Fitzgerald. Hall was the first female vocalist to sing and record with Duke Ellington. She holds the accolade of being the 20th century's most enduring female recording artist, her recording career having spanned eight decades. In 1941, Hall replaced Gracie Fields as Britain's highest paid female entertainer.

In the "100 Great Records of the 1920s" Hall is at number 26 with Duke Ellington's Orchestra, singing "The Blues I Love to Sing" (Duke Ellington/Bubber Miley), Victor 21490, 1927. Influential writer Langston Hughes, in his book Famous Negro Music Makers (published by Dodd, Mead, 1955) lists individual musicians that helped develop jazz, in which he states that "jazz singers too, had not been without influence on the development of this (Jazz) music", and then includes Hall alongside Louis Armstrong, Cab Calloway, Ray Nance and Joe Carroll, Dizzy Gillespie, Ella Fitzgerald, Billie Holiday, Alberta Hunter, Baby Cox and Florence Mills, as all being outstanding jazz vocalists of their time.

Hall is mentioned in the novel Strange Brother (set in New York in the late 1920s, early 1930s) written by Blair Niles and first published in 1931. Published in 1998, Marsha Hunt's novel Like Venus Fading was inspired by the lives of Hall (known as the lightly-tanned Venus), Josephine Baker and Dorothy Dandridge. The mesmerising effect Hall had on her audience at the Cotton Club is captured in the fictionalised 2017 novel A Time in Ybor City by Ron Kase. Kase's account captures Hall's 11:00 o'clock evening performance in the Cotton Club Parade revue, at which George Gershwin is in the audience. The account is a fictionalised account based on part fact.

"When Harry Met Addie" was composed by Gavin Bryars in 1999 (published by Schott Music Ltd., London). Bryars wrote it as a tribute to Hall and saxophonist Harry Carney. The piece was first performed at the Duke Ellington Memorial Concert at the Queen Elizabeth Hall, London, on 1 May 1999, and was commissioned by the baritone saxophonist/bass clarinettist John Surman. The soprano was Cristina Zavalloni and the London Sinfonietta Big Band was conducted by Diego Masson.

Hall was loosely portrayed as the nightclub chanteuse (Lila Rose Oliver) in Francis Ford Coppola's 1984 film The Cotton Club.

It was Hall's husband, Bert Hicks, who suggested to Eric Bartholomew's mother that he should change his stage name to Morecambe, after the place of her son's birth, thereby christening the British comic duo Morecambe and Wise.

=== Underneath a Harlem Moon, 2013–2014 ===
During 2013, British singer Laura Mvula revealed in a Blues and Soul interview with assistant editor Pete Lewis that her song "Sing to the Moon" (from her hit debut album Sing to the Moon, RCA/Sony Music) was inspired by the 2003 biography of Hall entitled Underneath a Harlem Moon: The Harlem to Paris Years of Adelaide Hall, by Iain Cameron Williams:

Well, the actual song "Sing to the Moon" came from a time when I was reading a book called Underneath a Harlem Moon, which is a biography of a jazz singer called Adelaide Hall, which is basically all about how she kind of was overlooked, or probably didn't get the recognition she perhaps deserved. Plus it also talks about how she'd had a hard time growing up, because her sister – who she was very close to – had died tragically of an illness.... So anyway, there's a point in the story where she describes her close relationship with her father, which I think kind of resonated with me – where she talks about the conversations she had with him and how he used to say to her randomly 'Sing to the moon and the stars will shine', which kind of became her thing really that she just took with her everywhere.... And I don't know why, but for some reason it just struck some kind of chord with me – you know, it was just something I seemed to connect with at that time. And so because of that, it then became a saying that I liked to use myself.... So yeah, because it's become something I personally like to express, I just thought 'Sing to the Moon' would also make a good title for the album as a whole.

On 11 August 2014, Mvula released her second album, an orchestral version of Sing to the Moon, and on 19 August 2014, Mvula appeared at the Royal Albert Hall as part of The Proms season, performing the entire album Sing to the Moon, accompanied by the Metropole Orkest.

In 2014, "Sing to the Moon" was sampled by the American rapper XXXTentacion and incorporated in his song "Vice City", which launched his music career.

=== After Midnight, Broadway musical 2013–2014 ===
A new musical revue After Midnight featuring the classic music of Duke Ellington, Dorothy Fields and Jimmy McHugh, and Harold Arlen, premiered to much praise at the Brooks Atkinson Theatre in New York on 3 November 2013 and was booked through to 31 August 2014. The show is an idealised fantasy of Harlem in its 1920s–1930s heyday and salutes black musicians and performers such as Ethel Waters, Hall, Cab Calloway, Duke Ellington and the Nicholas Brothers, who became international stars during that era.

At least three of the songs that Hall introduced are performed in the show, including headliner Fantasia Barrino's rendition of "I Can't Give You Anything but Love, Baby" and Carmen Ruby Floyd's performance of Ellington and Hall's "Creole Love Call". The song "Diga Diga Do" also appears in the show.

=== A Nite at the Cotton Club, 2014 ===
In February 2014, a new stage show called A Nite at the Cotton Club, produced by Lydia Dillingham, opened at the Southern Broadway Dinner Theatre at The Historic Hildreth Brothers Building in Alabama, USA, in which the actress Brandy Davis portrays Hall. The entire run sold out.

=== ASCAP 100 Years, 2014 ===
On 14 February 2014, the American Society of Composers, Authors and Publishers (ASCAP) celebrated its centenary by publishing a timeline of songs chosen to represent the past hundred years. One song was chosen to represent each year. Dorothy Fields and Jimmy McHugh's song "I Can't Give You Anything but Love, Baby", written for the Broadway revue Blackbirds of 1928, was chosen for 1928, and Hall's recording of the song was chosen to represent the year.

=== Downton Addy's, 2020 ===
As part of Black History Month in June 2020, Sherman's Showcase – an American musical TV comedy series created by actors Bashir Salahuddin and Diallo Riddle – portrayed Adelaide Hall in a Harlem Renaissance meets Downton Abbey musical sketch titled Downton Addy's. The show was aired on 19 June on stations AMC and IFC. Bashir Salahuddin played the part of Paul Robeson, Day'Nah Cooper took the role of Dowager Countess of Basie, Aleksei Archer portrayed Adelaide "Addy" Hall, and Nefetari Spencer brought Zora Neale Hurston to life. Costume designer Ariyela Wald-Cohain looked directly to the Downton Abbey movie for visual references. Critics praised it: Rolling Stone called it "the hidden gem of sketch comedy"; The New York Times said it was "irreverent", and Salon said it was "bright, accessibly silly and uproarious". Collider called it "a hard show to explain but a very easy one to fall in love with".

In June 2020, British Vogue acknowledged Adelaide Hall in their list of "7 Remarkable Black Women Who Shaped British History".

=== Black Plaque awarded to Adelaide Hall, 2021 ===
Adelaide Hall was honoured in 2021 by the Black Plaque Project, an initiative of the Nubian Jak Community Trust, with a plaque commemorating her outstanding career and achievements in the world of entertainment. The plaque is placed in the world-renowned Abbey Road Recording Studios in St John's Wood, London, where Hall recorded with fellow American jazz artiste and composer Fats Waller. Hall is No. 15 in the Black Plaque Project that honours the achievements throughout history of members of the UK's black community.

=== One Minute Theatre Top 10 People of Colour in Musicals, 2021 ===
In March 2021, 1 Minute Theatre Reviews acknowledged Adelaide Hall in their 10 "people of colour who have made a major contribution to the stage musical".

=== Women Inspire podcast, 2021 ===
Adelaide Hall - "Sing to the moon Addie and the stars will shine."

In January 2021, the Women Inspire podcast devoted an episode to the life and career of Hall, titled "Sing to the moon Addie and the stars will shine".

=== Google Doodle, 2023 ===
In honour of UK Black History Month, what would have been Hall's 122nd birthday was celebrated with a Google Doodle, featuring illustrations by London-based artist Hannah Ekuwa Buckman.

=== Blue plaque ===
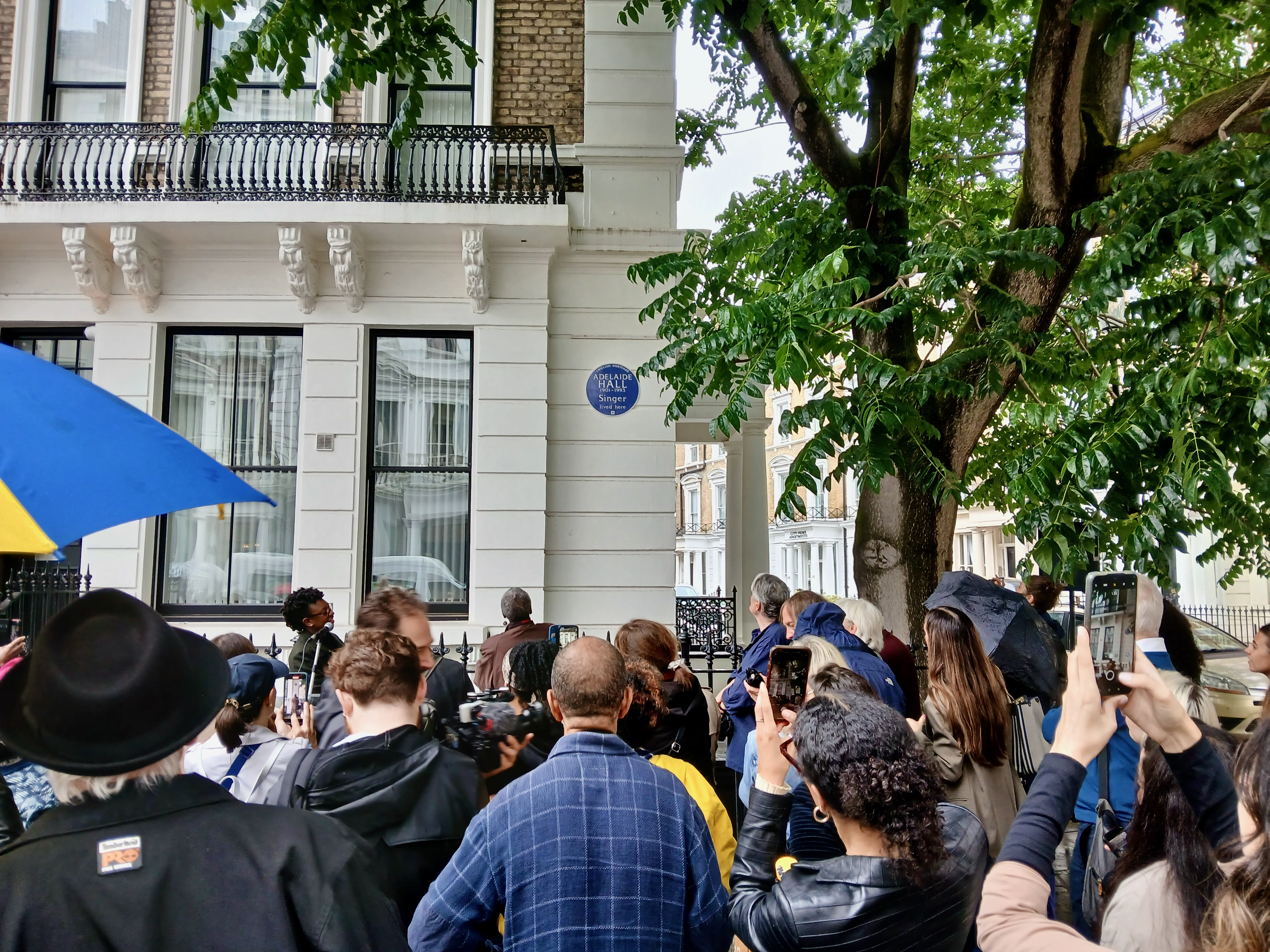
Crowds of spectators outside the unveiling of the Adelaide Hall Blue Plaque in Collingham Road, Kensington and Chelsea, London, July 9, 2024.

Hall was one of the recipients of an English Heritage blue plaque in 2024, alongside Christina Broom, Diana Beck and Irene Barclay. A blue plaque was unveiled at her former home of 27 years at 1 Collingham Road, South Kensington, SW5 ONT, in the Royal Borough of Kensington and Chelsea on 9 July 2024. Singer/actress Elaine Delmar pulled the cord to unveil the blue plaque and the singer/songwriter Tori Cross performed one of Hall’s classic Cotton Club songs, “Stormy Weather”.

== Discography ==
=== 1927–1938 ===
Songs	Label & number	Date	Artist
"Creole Love Call" / "The Blues I Love to Sing"	BVE-39370-1/ BVE-39371-1 Victor Records	(26 October 1927) (recorded Victor Studio No. 1, Camden, NJ )	Duke Ellington Orchestra (vocals by Adelaide Hall)
"I Must Have That Man" / "Baby"	BVE-Test-110	(21 June 1928) (recorded in New York)	Adelaide Hall with piano acc. by George Rickman
"Chicago Stomp Down"	W81777-A / W81777-B / W81777-C Columbia Records	(3 November 1927) (recorded OKeh session, Union Square, New York City)	Duke Ellington Orchestra (vocals by Adelaide Hall)
"Blues I Love to Sing"	21490-A Victor BVE-39371	(26 October 1927)	Duke Ellington Orchestra (vocals by Adelaide Hall)
"I Must Have That Man" / "Baby"	E-28059 / E-28060 Brunswick 4031	(14 August 1928) (recorded in New York)	Adelaide Hall acc. by Lew Leslie's Blackbirds Orchestra
"Rhapsody in Love" / "Minnie The Moocher"	R-218 / R-221 Brunswick	(October 1931) (recorded in London, UK)	Adelaide Hall with piano acc. by Francis J. Carter and Bennie Paine
"Too Darn Fickle" / "I Got Rhythm"	R-225 / R-229	(October 1931) (recorded in London)	Adelaide Hall with piano acc. by Francis J. Carter and Bennie Paine
"Baby Mine" / "I'm Redhot From Harlem"	R-230 / R-232	(October 1931) (recorded in London)	Adelaide Hall with piano acc. by Francis J. Carter and Bennie Paine
"To Have and To Hold" / "Minnie The Moocher"	P-102 Oriole UK	(October 1931) (recorded in London, UK)	Adelaide Hall with piano acc. by Francis J. Carter and Bennie Paine
"Strange As It Seems" / "I'll Never Be The Same"	Br 6376 / Br6362 Brunswick	(5 August 1932) (recorded in New York)	Adelaide Hall with orchestra acc.
"You Gave Me Everything but Love" / "This Time It's Love"	B-12166-A / B-12167-A Brunswick	(10 August 1932) (recorded in New York)	Adelaide Hall with piano acc. by Francis J. Carter and Art Tatum
"I Must Have That Man" / "Baby"	B-12773-B / B-12774-B CBS	(21 December 1932) (recorded ARC session, New York City)	Adelaide Hall with Duke Ellington and his Famous Orchestra
"I Must Have That Man" / "Baby"	B-12773-C / B-12774-C Brunswick	(7 January 1933) (recorded Arc session, New York City)	Adelaide Hall with Duke Ellington and his Famous Orchestra
"Drop Me Off in Harlem" / "Reaching for the Cotton Moon"	BS-78827-1-2 / BS-78828-1-2-3 Victor	(4 December 1933)	Adelaide Hall with Mills Blue Rhythm Band
"I Must Have That Man" / "Baby"	B-12773-B / B-12774-B issue 5063 Lucky Records Co. Tokyo (Japan) issued 1935	(21 December 1932) (recorded ARC session, New York City)	Adelaide Hall with Duke Ellington and his Famous Orchestra
"I'm in the Mood For Love" / "Truckin'"	P-77612 / p-77613 Ultraphone AP 1574	(January 1936, Paris, France)	Adelaide Hall (vocals and tap dancing) accompanied by Joe Turner on piano
"East of the Sun and West of the Moon" / "Solitude"	P-77616 / P-77618 Ultraphone AP1575	(20 January 1936, Paris, France)	Adelaide Hall with John Ellsworth and his Orchestra with Stephane Grappelli on violin) Alex Renard (trumpet) Christian Wagner (clarinet, alto saxophone) Jacques Metehen (piano) Roger Chaput (guitar) Maurice Chailloux (drums) and others
"I'm Shooting High" / "Say You're Mine"	CPT-2649-1 / CPT-2652-1 Pathe PA 914	(5 May 1936, Paris)	Adelaide Hall with Willie Lewis and his Orchestra
"After You've Gone" / "Swing Guitars"	CPT-1 / CPT-1 Pathe PA	(15 May 1936, Paris)	Adelaide Hall with Willie Lewis and his Orchestra
"I'm Shooting High"	CPT-1 / Pathe PA	(15 October 1936, Paris)	Adelaide Hall with Willie Lewis and his Orchestra (trumpeter Bill Coleman is included on this recording)
"There's a Lull in my Life" / "Medley"	K-6001 / K-6001 D-599 Tono (Copenhagen, Denmark)	(December 1937)	Adelaide Hall with the Kai Ewans Orchestra
"Stormy Weather" / "Where or When"	K-6002 / K-6002 Tono (Copenhagen, Denmark)	(December 1937)	Adelaide Hall with the Kai Ewans Orchestra
"That Old Feeling" / "I Can't Give You Anything but Love"	His Master's Voice (EMI Records)	(28 August 1938) (recorded at Abbey Road Studios, London, UK)	Adelaide Hall with organ acc. by Fats Waller
"You're Blasé"	BBC Radio Transcription Service – The London Transcription Service 10PH 12545 78 rpm	(1939) (recorded at BBC Studios, London, UK)	Adelaide Hall with Stéphane Grappelli and Arthur Young and his Swingtette

=== The Decca years, 1939–1945 ===
Songs	Label & number	Release date
"I Have Eyes" / "I Promise You"	Decca F-7049	(27 April 1939)
"Deep Purple" / "Solitude"	Decca F-7083	(15 May 1939)
"A New Moon and an Old Serenade" / "Our Love"	Decca F-7095	(6 June 1939)
"Don't Worry 'Bout Me" / "'Tain't What You Do"	Decca F-7121	(23 June 1939)
"Transatlantic Lullaby" / "I Get Along Without You Very Well"	Decca F-7132	(26 July 1939)
"Moon Love" / "Yours for a Song"	Decca F-7272	(17 October 1939)
"Day In, Day Out"/ "I Poured My Heart into a Song"	Decca F-7304	(8 November 1939)
"My Heart Belongs to Daddy" / "Have You Met Miss Jones?"	Decca F-7305	(8 November 1939)
"Serenade in Love" / "Fare Thee Well"	Decca F-7340	(27 December 1939)
"Where or When" / "The Lady Is a Tramp"	Decca F-7345	(19 January 1940)
"Careless" / "Don't Make Me Laugh"	Decca F-7340	(11 March 1940)
"Chloe" / "Begin the Beguine"	Decca F-7460	(15 April 1940)
"This Can't Be Love" / "No Souvenirs"	Decca F-7501	(3 May 1940)
"Who Told You I Cared"? / "Shake Down the Stars"	Decca F-7522	(31 May 1940)
"Mist on the River" / "Fools Rush In"	Decca F-7583	(15 August 1940)
"All The Things You Are" / "I Wanna Be Loved"	Decca F-7636	(9 October 1940)
"Goodnight Again" / "Trade Winds"	Decca F-7678	(12 December 1940)
"Our Love Affair" / "And So Do I"	Decca F-7681	(12 December 1940)
"Moon for Sale" / "Yesterday's Dreams"	Decca F-7708	(7 February 1941)
"Ain't It a Shame About Mame"? / "Room Five Hundred and Four"	Decca F-7709	(7 February 1941)
"It's Always You" / "How Did He Look"?	Decca F-7879	(23 May 1941)
"Yes, My Darling Daughter" / "The Things I Love"	Decca F-7891	(23 May 1941)
"I Hear a Rhapsody" / "Mississippi Mama"	Decca F-7918	(3 July 1941)
"I Yi, Yi, Yi, Yi (I Like You Very Much)" / "Moonlight in Mexico"	Decca F-7942	(7 August 1941)
"As if You Didn't Know" / "I Take to You"	Decca F-8030	(5 November 1941)
"Minnie from Trinidad" / "Sand in My Shoes"	Decca F-8031	(5 November 1941)
"Song of the Islands" / "Pagan Love Song"	Decca F-8058	(7 November 1941)
"I Don't Want to Set the World on Fire" / "My Sister and I"	Decca F-8043	(18 November 1941)
"A Sinner Kissed an Angel" / "Why Don't We Do This More Often"?	Decca F-8092	(2 February 1942)
"Tropical Magic" / "Intermezzo"	Decca F-8118	(2 February 1942)
"My Devotion" / "Sharing It All With You"	Decca F-8263	(January 1943)
"Let's Get Lost" / "As Time Goes By"	Decca F-8292	(1943)
"I Don't Want Anybody at All (If I Can't Have You)" / "I Heard You Cried Last Night"	Decca F-8362	(6 September 1943)
"Sophisticated Lady" / "I'm Getting Sentimental Over You"	Decca F-8467	(4 August 1944)
"There Goes That Song Again" / "I'm Gonna Love That Guy"	Decca F-8517	(3 March 1945)

=== Odeon (Argentina) 1943 ===
Songs	Label & number	Release date
"Segun Pasan Los Anos (As Time Goes By)" / "Vamos a Perdernos (Let's Get Lost)"	Odeon DR-7240/7239	(1943)

=== London Records, Spirituals, 1949 ===
Adelaide Hall and Kenneth Cantril, Spirituals, 78 rpm set

Songs	Label & number	Release date	Artist
"Nobody Know de Trouble I've Seen" / "Sometimes I Feel Like a Motherless Child"	London	(1949)	Adelaide Hall and Kenneth Cantril
"Deep River" / "Bye and Bye"	London	(1949)	Adelaide Hall and Kenneth Cantril
"My Lord, What a Morning" / "Swing Low Sweet Chariot"	London	(1949)	Adelaide Hall and Kenneth Cantril

=== Columbia (EMI) – 1951 ===
Songs	Label & number	Date	Artist
"Can't Help Loving That Man of Mine" / "Bill"	Columbia Gramophone Co. (EMI Records)	(11 July 1951) (recorded in London, UK)	Adelaide Hall
"How Many Times" / "Vanity"	Columbia Gramophone Co. (EMI Records)	(11 July 1951) (recorded in London)	Adelaide Hall

=== Oriole – 1960 ===
Songs	Label & number	Date	Artist
"Bluebird on My Shoulder" / "Common Sense"	Oriole (CB 1556)	(May 1960) (recorded in London)	Adelaide Hall

=== UK singles chart entries ===
Year	Single	Chart positions		Peak month
Year	Single	UK		
1940	"Careless"	30	May	
1940	"Begin the Beguine"	28	June	
1940	"All the Things You Are"	26	December	
1941	"Where Are You?"	28	December	
1945	"There Goes That Song Again"	15	June	

=== US singles chart entries ===
Year	Single	Chart position	Peak month
US
1928	"Creole Love Call" ft. Adelaide Hall vcl.	19	June

=== Albums ===
Year	Títle	Label	Number
1970	Hall of Fame	Columbia	B00BTZHK44
1976	Hall of Ellington	Columbia	B00BTZ9RPE
1980	There Goes That Song Again	Decca – RFL73	
1990	Adelaide Hall – Live at the Riverside Studios (soundtrack)	TER / VIP SERIES	CDVIR 8312
1990	I Touched a Star	B0057POL5S	
1990	Hall of Memories	Conifer Records	B003BFC94Q
1992	Crooning Blackbird	Jazz Archives	B000027ZPN

== Filmography ==
- A Son of Satan (1924) (USA) (Micheaux Film)
- Dancers in the Dark (1932) (USA) (Hall's singing voice is used but she is uncredited)
- On the Air and Off (1933) (USA short, filmed at Biograph Studios, Bronx, New York City) (Universal Pictures)
- Broadway Varieties (1934) (USA short, filmed at Biograph Studios, Bronx, New York City) (Universal Pictures)
- All-Coloured Vaudeville Show (1935) (USA)
- The Kentucky Minstrels (1939 (British TV movie)
- The Thief of Bagdad (1940) (UK)
- Behind The Blackout (1940), British Pathé Newsreel
- Stars In Your Eyes (TV series, UK) 1946–1950.
- Variety in Sepia (1947) (UK) (BBC TV)
- A World Is Turning (towards the coloured people) (1948) (UK)
- Olivelli's (1951), British Pathé Newsreel
- Love From Judy (1953) TV movie.
- Night and the City (1959) (UK) (role – singer – the scenes were deleted from the final edit)
- Looks Familiar (9 January 1974) (ITV)
- What Is Jazz? (1974) (TV Documentary)
- It Don't Mean A Thing (15 June 1976)
- Parkinson (TV series): 300th edition (1981) (BBC TV)
- The Sacred Music of Duke Ellington (1982) (MGM) – recorded at St. Paul's Cathedral, London (released 1983)
- The Cotton Club Comes to the Ritz (1985) (A documentary with live performances at the Ritz Hotel, London, featuring former Cotton Club performers)
- Chasing a Rainbow: The Life of Josephine Baker (1986)
- Brown Sugar (1986) (American TV mini-series)
- Sophisticated Lady (1989) (UK) (documentary about Adelaide Hall)
- Royal Ellington (1989) (live concert footage)
- Adelaide Hall – Live at the Riverside (1989) (UK) (Adelaide Hall in concert)

== Exhibitions ==
Exhibitions that feature or have featured content relating to Adelaide Hall:

- Women and War – Imperial War Museum, London (2003–04).
- Little Black Dress – Brighton Museum and Art Gallery, Brighton (2007).
- Devotional – Sonia Boyce, National Portrait Gallery, London (2007)
- Little Black Dress – London Fashion Museum, London (2008).
- Keep Smiling Through: Black Londoners on the Home Front 1939–1945 – Cuming Museum, London (2008).
- Jazzonia and the Harlem Diaspora – Chelsea Space, London (2009).
- The Living Archive Exhibition – The London Palladium (opened 2009 – on permanent display). The collection throws a spotlight on 100 years of black performers at the Palladium, such as Adelaide Hall, the Harlem Renaissance star who made her London debut at the venue in 1931.
- Oh! Adelaide – Art installation, Wimbledon Space, Wimbledon College of Art, London (2010).
- There is no Archive in which Nothing Gets Lost – Oh! Adelaide – Art installation – The Museum of Fine Arts, Glassell School of Art, 5101 Montrose Boulevard, Houston, America – 7 September 2012 – 25 November 2012.
- Creole Love Call – Exhibition – VIERTELNEUN Gallery, 1090 Vienna, Hahngasse 14, Austria – Exhibition (25 January to 28 February 2013) – Catalogue published with the presentation.
- The Harlem Renaissance – Kurá Hulanda Museum, Curaçao, Willemstad, Caribbean (2013).
- Scat: Sound and Collaboration – Iniva (Institute of International Visual Arts), London EC2A 3BA (5 June – 27 July 2013).
- Untitled – etching by Sonia Boyce. Permanent Collection, Studio Museum in Harlem, New York. In her 2006 etching Untitled, Boyce pays tribute to 14 black female contributors to British music history. Performers featured in the composition include Dame Shirley Bassey, Adelaide Hall, Millie Small and Cleo Laine.
- Black Women in Britain, Black Cultural Archives, 1 Windrush Square, Brixton, London SW2 1EF (24 July – 30 November 2014.
- Rhythm & Reaction: The Age of Jazz in Britain: Explores the emergence of Jazz in Britain and its continuing influence over the last century. Two pictures of Adelaide Hall, one by photographer Angus McBean, and another extremely rare photograph of Miss Hall taken at her Florida (Mayfair) nightclub were on display at the exhibition, which was curated by Catherine Tackley, from 27 January 2018 until 22 April 2018, located at William Waldorf Astor's mansion at Two Temple Place, London.
- BBC 100th Anniversary, 2022 - The Women Behind Television. Exhibition and celebrations to celebrate the 100 years anniversary of the BBC.

== Adelaide Hall archives and photo collections ==
- The Indiana University Adelaide Hall Collection (1928–2003). The collection is housed at the Archives of African American Music and Culture at Indiana University, collection number SC 134. The collection contains photographic materials, articles, programs and ephemera related to Hall's performance career: contact: Archives of African American Music and Culture, 2805 E 10th St., Suite 180–181, Bloomington, Ind. 47408–4662.
- Writer Iain Cameron Williams and Adelaide Hall's former manager Kate Greer own a private Adelaide Hall Collection, from which items have been loaned for public exhibitions. In March 2025, Williams announced he had donated his Adelaide Hall Collection to the American Museum and Gardens in Bath, Somerset for future generations to benefit from.
- Alamy Photo Archive: Adelaide Hall on set of the 1940 Alexander Korda-directed movie The Thief of Bagdad.
- The British Library in Euston Road, London, holds a considerable archive relating to Adelaide Hall; the collection contains mainly audio, interviews, live concert tapes, and recordings, some of which are quite rare.
- The British Lion Film Production disc collection (held at the British Library) contains music from the film soundtrack of Night and the City (1950), on which Adelaide Hall is featured.
- Detroit Public Library Digital Collection houses a portrait of singer Adelaide Hall by photographer Germaine Krull dated 1929, photographed during Blackbirds residency at the Moulin Rouge, Paris.
- Duke University Libraries – Rosetta Reitz Papers (1929–2008) – Adelaide Hall photograph collection series (Box 17): Rosetta Reitz Papers – Adelaide Hall Reference Materials Series (1946–2005), Box 36.
- Getty Images (archive) holds several photographs of Adelaide Hall, including one of her singing "There's Something in the Air" at her Mayfair nightclub (the Florida Club) in London, circa. 1945, and an extremely rare picture of her performing in concert circa. 1930, and a portrait photograph of Miss Hall by John D. Kisch circa. 1934.
- The Al Hirschfeld Foundation holds two caricatures of Adelaide Hall by the artist Al Hirschfeld, one dated 1928, and the other dated 1929.
- The Robert Langmuir African American Photograph Collection, Emory University, Atlanta, Georgia: Adelaide Hall
- The David Lund Collection held at the British Library contains live audio recordings of Adelaide Hall in concert with The Alan Clare Trio and John McLeary performing at the University College School Theatre, Hampstead, London.
- Millersville University Special Collection: Adelaide Hall, File – Box: 4, Folder 21, 1929, photograph of Miss Hall by Walery (aka Stanisław Julian Ignacy Ostroróg).
- Museo Alinari Image (AIM), museum, Trieste, Italy, hold two portrait photographs of Adelaide Hall ca. 1925–29.
- The National Jazz Archive (UK) holds a significant collection of magazines and newspapers containing articles and reports documenting Adelaide Hall's career dating from the 1930s to 1990s.
- National Portrait Gallery, London (Archive) holds two Adelaide Hall portraits from the 1940s.
- NYPR Archive Collections, New York Public Library, hold a live recording of Adelaide Hall captured in concert in New York in the early-1990s.
- Smithsonian – Adelaide Hall portrait – Le Tumulte Noir / Dancer in Magenta by Paul Colin, 1929, Paris, at the Smithsonian, National Portrait Gallery Collection, Washington D.C.
- The Victoria and Albert Museum (V&A), South Kensington, London, holds a watercolour caricature of Adelaide Hall by Gilbert Sommerlad, dated 12 May 1954, drawn during Hall's starring role in the musical Love from Judy, plus various posters relating to Miss Hall's career, and a cotton souvenir headscarf containing a printed portrait of Adelaide Hall ca.1930s–50s.
- Yale University Archives, Adelaide Hall – Josephine Baker correspondence, etc. (dated 1976–1979), part of the Henry Hurford Janes – Josephine Baker Collection at Yale University Archives, Box: 2, Folder: 77.
- Yale University Library – Beinecke Rare Book and Manuscript Library: Rare Adelaide Hall photographs by Carl Van Vechten taken of Miss Hall performing on stage during her 1931/1932 World Tour at the Palace Theatre, Times Square, New York.
- Yale University Library – Beinecke Rare Book and Manuscript Library: Adelaide Hall publicity photographs collected by writer and photographer Carl Van Vechten.

== Sources ==
- Ian Carr, Digby Fairweather and Brian Priestley. Jazz: The Rough Guide. ISBN 1-85828-528-3
- Iain Cameron Williams, Underneath A Harlem Moon, Continuum, 2002, ISBN 0-8264-5893-9
