= Chi-Baba, Chi-Baba (My Bambino Go to Sleep) =

Song performed by Perry Como

"Chi-Baba, Chi-Baba (My Bambino Go to Sleep)" is a popular song written by Mack David, Jerry Livingston, and Al Hoffman, and published in 1947.

== Background ==
The lyrics are intended to sound like Italian non-sense, cooed to a baby as a lullaby.

== Perry Como recording ==
The song was popularized by Perry Como in 1947, backed up by The Satisfiers with Lloyd Shaffer and his Orchestra. The recording was released by RCA Victor Records as catalog number 20-2259. The record first reached the Billboard charts on May 30, 1947, and lasted 12 weeks on the chart, peaking at No.1. The flip side of the record, "When You Were Sweet Sixteen", was also a big hit, reaching No.2 on the chart.

== Other recordings ==
- Adelaide Hall appears in the earliest post-war BBC telerecording singing "Chi-Baba, Chi-Baba (My Bambino Go to Sleep" live at RadiOlympia Theatre on October 7, 1947, for a BBC TV show entitled Variety in Sepia. When the show was originally broadcast on BBC TV it was 60 minutes in length and also included performances from Winifred Atwell, Evelyn Dove, Cyril Blake and his Calypso Band, Edric Connor and Mable Lee and was produced by Eric Fawcett. The six-minute footage of Miss Hall is all that survives of the show.
- Other recordings of the song were made by Peggy Lee, by Blue Barron, and by The Charioteers about the same time. The Wiggles also sang this song on their album and DVD Pop Go the Wiggles for Anthony Field's newborn son, Antonio who debuted himself, although the song was not featured on the US version of the DVD.
