= Liberty Theatre =

Venue in Manhattan, New York

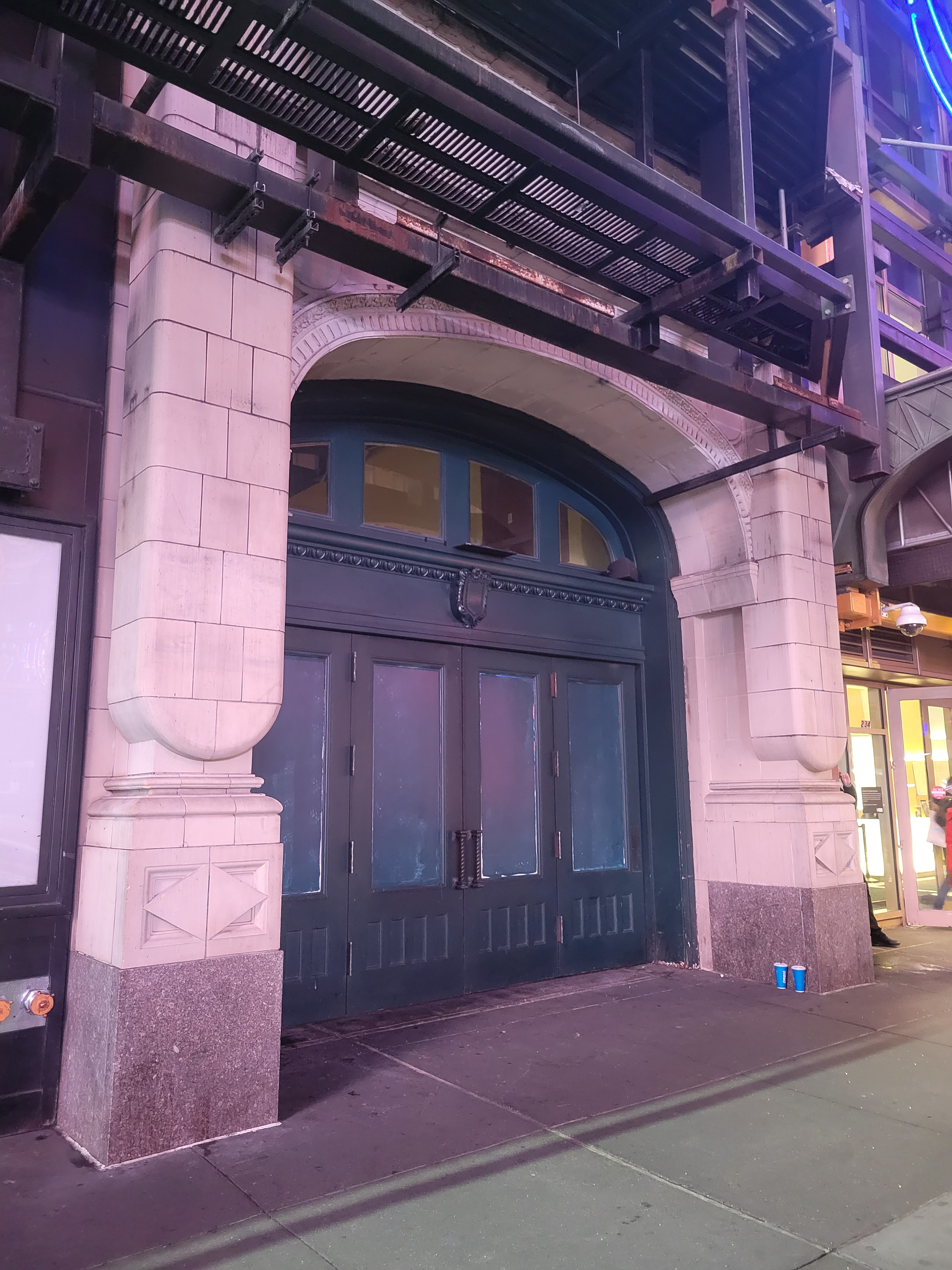
- Former entrance to the Liberty Theatre in 2021
- Interactive map of Liberty Theatre
- Address: 234 West 42nd Street; Manhattan, New York; United States
- Coordinates: 40°45′23″N 73°59′19″W
- Owner: City and State of New York; leased to New 42nd Street
- Operator: Brookfield Asset Management
- Capacity: 1055
- Type: Former Broadway
- Current use: Event venue

Construction
- Opened: October 10, 1904; 122 years ago
- Closed: 1933 (Broadway theater)
- Rebuilt: 2011
- Years active: 1904–1933 (Broadway theater); 1915–1916, 1932 – late 1980s (movie theater); 2011–present (event venue)
- Architect: Herts & Tallant

The Liberty Theatre is a former Broadway theater at 234 West 42nd Street in the Theater District of Midtown Manhattan in New York City, New York, US. Opened in 1904, the theater was designed by Herts & Tallant and built for Klaw and Erlanger, the partnership of theatrical producers Marc Klaw and A. L. Erlanger. The theater has been used as an event venue since 2011 and is part of an entertainment and retail complex developed by Forest City Ratner. The theater is owned by the city and state governments of New York and leased to New 42nd Street. Brookfield Asset Management, which acquired Forest City in 2018, subleases the venue from New 42nd Street.

The Liberty Theatre consists of an auditorium facing 41st Street and a lobby facing 42nd Street. The facade on 42nd Street is largely hidden but was designed in the neoclassical style, similar to the neighboring New Amsterdam Theatre, designed by the same architects. The lobby from 42nd Street led to the auditorium in the rear, as well as men's and women's lounges in the basement. The auditorium, designed in the Art Nouveau style, contains two balconies cantilevered above ground-level orchestra seating. The theater has a steel frame and was designed with advanced mechanical systems for its time. The original design included depictions of the Liberty Bell and bald eagles, which have since been removed.

The Liberty opened on October 10, 1904, and in its early years hosted several hit productions, which largely consisted of comedies, dramas, or musicals. D. W. Griffith briefly screened movies at the theater in the 1910s. After Klaw and Erlanger ended their partnership in 1919, Erlanger continued to operate the theater until 1931; the Liberty was leased the next year to Max Rudnick, who presented movies and vaudeville. The Liberty hosted its last legitimate show in 1933, and the Brandt family took over the venue, operating it as a movie theater until the 1980s. The city and state governments of New York acquired the theater as part of the 42nd Street Redevelopment Project in 1990. Forest City Ratner developed an entertainment and retail complex on the site in the 1990s, but the Liberty Theatre remained largely abandoned until the early 21st century, when it became a restaurant space and event venue.

== Site ==
The Liberty Theatre is at 234 West 42nd Street, on the south side between Seventh Avenue and Eighth Avenue near the southern end of Times Square, in the Theater District of Midtown Manhattan in New York City, New York, US. The theater is part of an entertainment and retail complex at 234 West 42nd Street, which includes the Madame Tussauds New York museum and the AMC Empire 25 movie theater. The complex's land lot covers 54,060 ft^{2} (5,022 m^{2}) and extends 200 ft (61 m) between its two frontages on 41st and 42nd Streets, with a frontage of 270 ft (82 m) on 41st Street and 350 ft (110 m) on 42nd Street. Originally, the theater occupied its own land lot; the main frontage on 42nd Street measured only 20 ft (6.1 m) wide, while the 41st Street frontage measured 100 ft (30 m) wide. This is because the developers, Abraham L. Erlanger and Marcus Klaw, wanted the more prominent 42nd Street frontage as the main entrance.

The city block includes the Candler Building, New Amsterdam Theatre, and 5 Times Square to the east, as well as Eleven Times Square to the west. The E-Walk entertainment complex is directly across 42nd Street to the northwest. The Todd Haimes Theatre and Times Square Theatre are to the north, while the Lyric Theatre, New Victory Theater, and 3 Times Square are to the northeast. In addition, the Port Authority Bus Terminal is to the west, the New York Times Building is to the southwest, and the Nederlander Theatre is to the south.

The surrounding area is part of Manhattan's Theater District and contains many Broadway theaters. In the first two decades of the 20th century, eleven venues for legitimate theater were built within one block of West 42nd Street between Seventh and Eighth Avenues. The New Amsterdam, Harris, Liberty, Eltinge (now Empire), and Lew Fields theaters occupied the south side of the street. The original Lyric and Apollo theaters (combined into the current Lyric Theatre), as well as the Times Square, Victory, Selwyn (now Todd Haimes), and Victoria theaters, occupied the north side. These venues were mostly converted to movie theaters by the 1930s, and many of them had been relegated to showing pornography by the 1970s.

== Design ==
The Liberty Theatre was designed by architects Herts & Tallant and developed for Klaw and Erlanger in 1904. It was built by the Murphy Construction Company. Herts and Tallant designed the theater in the Art Nouveau style, similar to their earlier projects in New York City (namely the New Amsterdam, Lyceum, and German theaters), although the Liberty's architectural detail was smaller in scale than in the other theaters.

=== Exterior ===
The Liberty Theatre originally had a three-story-tall neoclassical facade on 42nd Street, similar to the neighboring New Amsterdam Theatre (also designed by Herts and Tallant). The entrance was through an arch, which was flanked by sign boards and topped by an electric sign. On either side of the main entrance were caryatids representing comedy and song. The second and third floors, which contained the theater's offices, were spanned by a large archway. Above the arch was a stone shield, with a relief of the Liberty Bell carved into it. The facade was capped by a statue of a bald eagle with spread wings. There was an ornamental cornice above the top story. By the 1990s, most of the facade had been obscured or heavily modified, and the third story had been completely stripped of ornamentation. The 42nd Street facade is no longer visible above the first floor.

The rear facade on 41st Street remains intact, and The New York Times described it in 1996 as being in "good condition". Images indicate that the 41st Street facade is made of plain brick and has no windows. Projecting brick piers divide the facade into five bays. There are loading docks within three of the bays, as well as globe-shaped lanterns affixed to the piers. The facade does not have any other decoration.

=== Interior ===
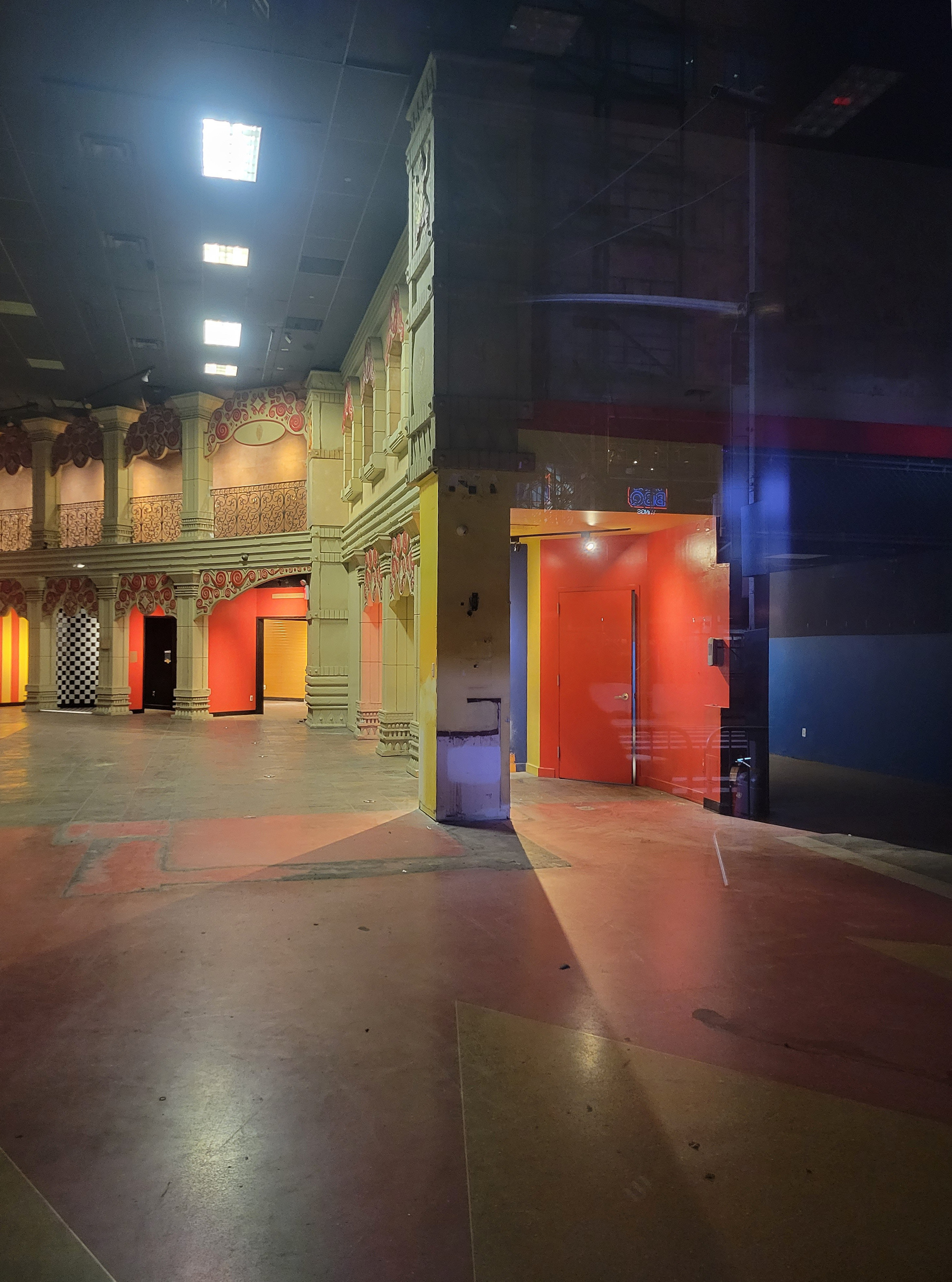
Interior of the theater in 2021, after it had been converted into an event space

The theater was mechanically advanced for its time, with heating, cooling, ventilation, and fire-suppression systems. The structural frame was made of skeletal steel, while the floors were made of concrete and tile. The theater's sprinkler system was supplied by a 15,000 US gal (57,000 L) water tank on the roof. All of the air in the theater could be changed within five minutes. In addition, there were 21 emergency exits within the theater building, excluding the fire escapes outside the dressing rooms, which allegedly allowed the theater to be cleared within two minutes. These emergency exits led to courtyards on either side of the theater, running between 41st and 42nd Streets. The structural frame and emergency exits may have been added in response to the Iroquois Theatre fire in 1903, where hundreds of people died in a Chicago theater that was allegedly fireproof.

==== Auditorium ====
The auditorium is at the south end of the building, near 41st Street. It originally measured 72 ft (22 m) wide, with a depth of 60 ft (18 m) between the stage and the rear wall. The auditorium's seats were spread across the orchestra level and two balconies. The theater had 1,055 seats. (Note: Henderson & Greene 2008, p. 110, states that the theater had 1,200 seats.) Unusually for theaters of the time, the balconies are cantilevered from the structural framework, which eliminated the need for columns that blocked sightlines. The orchestra level had 546 seats, arranged in 15 rows. The balcony levels were smaller; the upper balcony only had 264 seats. At the rear of the auditorium, a wide staircase led from the lobby to the two balcony levels, while promenades ran behind the seating areas on all three levels. The promenades were decorated in amber, white, and gold, a color scheme that was also used on the auditorium's seats, carpets, and other fabrics.

The original design included eight boxes, four on either side of the stage. The boxes were painted in ivory and gold. Above each set of boxes was a motif of a bald eagle, which in turn flanked a depiction of the Liberty Bell. The proscenium opening is 36 ft (11 m) wide and 32 ft (9.8 m) high. Unlike in other theaters, the proscenium arch was not topped by a sounding board; as a result, audiences at the rear of the auditorium did not receive amplified sound from the stage. By the 21st century, the rear walls of both balcony levels had been shifted forward significantly.

The stage was designed to accommodate comedies and large musicals, measuring about 35 ft (11 m) deep and 72 ft (22 m) wide. The top of the fly loft was 70 ft (21 m) above the stage. The Liberty's stage curtain was made of asbestos, as at many other theaters at the time, and contained a mural of Half Moon, the ship belonging to Dutch explorer Henry Hudson. The curtain, measuring 35 by 25 ft (10.7 by 7.6 m), was probably designed by F. Richards Anderson and was decorated in blue, green, and brown hues. With the deterioration of the theater in the late 20th century, parts of the asbestos curtain began to flake off.

==== Other spaces ====
The theater's lobby led from 42nd Street. It consisted of a vestibule with aluminum and gold decorations, as well as an ivory-and-white hallway that acted as a foyer. The vestibule had a domed ceiling measuring 30 ft (9.1 m) across. The foyer was 50 ft (15 m) long and was separated from the vestibule by doors covered in leather. The original lobby has been heavily modified.

At the rear of the orchestra-level promenade were stairs, which led to men's and women's lounges in the basement. The men's lounging and smoking room was decorated in the English style, with weathered-oak paneling as well as furniture covered with Spanish leather. The women's lounge was painted green, gold, and ivory.

== History ==
Times Square became the epicenter for large-scale theater productions between 1900 and the Great Depression. Manhattan's theater district had begun to shift from Union Square and Madison Square during the first decade of the 20th century. At the beginning of that century, Klaw and Erlanger operated the predominant theatrical booking agency in the United States. They decided to relocate to 42nd Street after observing that the Metropolitan Opera House, the Victoria Theatre, and the Theatre Republic (now New Victory Theater) had been developed around that area. Klaw and Erlanger hired Herts and Tallant to design the New Amsterdam Theatre at 214 West 42nd Street, which opened on October 26, 1903. Klaw and Erlanger then decided to build a second theater on the block, also designed by Herts and Tallant, which would host musicals by the Rogers Brothers. By early 1904, the Murphy Construction Company was constructing the theater's steel frame.

=== Legitimate use ===
==== 1900s and 1910s ====
The Liberty Theatre opened on October 10, 1904, with the revue The Rogers Brothers in Paris. This was followed the next month by Little Johnny Jones, the first large musical written by George M. Cohan. The Liberty hosted several hit productions in its early years, largely consisting of comedies, dramas, or musicals. The Liberty's second season included The Rogers Brothers in Ireland in late 1905, as well as the comedy-drama The Clansman, the Christmas musical The Gingerbread Man, and the musical Lincoln in early 1906. During the 1906–1907 season, Eleanor Robson produced several plays at the Liberty, and the theater also hosted The Follies of 1907, the first edition of the annual Ziegfeld Follies revue. The Rogers Brothers presented The Rogers Brothers in Panama in 1907, but, amid decreasing popularity, the brothers never performed at the Liberty again. Margaret Mayo's play Polly of the Circus opened in December 1907 and was a hit, running for 160 performances. Other shows in the Liberty Theatre's early years included The Redskins in 1906 with Tyrone Power Sr., as well as Wildfire in 1908 with Lillian Russell.

The musical The Arcadians opened at the Liberty in 1910, followed at the end of the same year by the operetta The Spring Maid, which stayed for six months. The theater's other productions in the early 1910s included the play The Fascinating Widow in 1911, the play Milestones in 1912, and the operetta Rob Roy and the musical Sweethearts in 1913. Around the same time, Klaw and Erlanger had become involved in the film industry; in 1913, they signed an agreement with the Biograph Company that allowed Biograph to produce two features weekly at the syndicate's theaters. Klaw and Erlanger leased the Liberty to movie-theater operator D. W. Griffith in February 1915, on the condition that movie tickets be sold at $2, the same price as tickets for plays. The next month, Griffith presented The Birth of a Nation, the first film to be screened at the theater. Griffith screened The Birth of a Nation over 750 times during the next nine months.

The Liberty again hosted live shows in early 1916, when it presented a week of variety performances by The Blue Pierrots troupe, as well as the musical Sybil. In August of that year, Griffith leased the Liberty Theatre again, this time for his film Intolerance. The Jerome Kern musical Have A Heart opened at the Liberty in January 1917, followed the same year by the revue Hitchy-Koo of 1917 and the play The Wooing of Eve with Laurette Taylor and Lynn Fontanne. At the end of the year, George M. Cohan and Sam H. Harris's musical Going Up opened at the Liberty, running for 351 performances. Following the success of the Ziegfeld Follies at the nearby New Amsterdam, Klaw and Erlanger presented two revues at the Liberty in 1919: George White's Scandals of 1919 and Hitchy-Koo of 1919. By then, Klaw and Erlanger's Theatrical Syndicate no longer had a monopoly on theatrical shows, and they had dissolved their partnership. A. L. Erlanger continued to produce shows at the Liberty Theatre, while Marcus Klaw developed his own venue on 45th Street, the Klaw Theatre.

==== 1920s and early 1930s ====
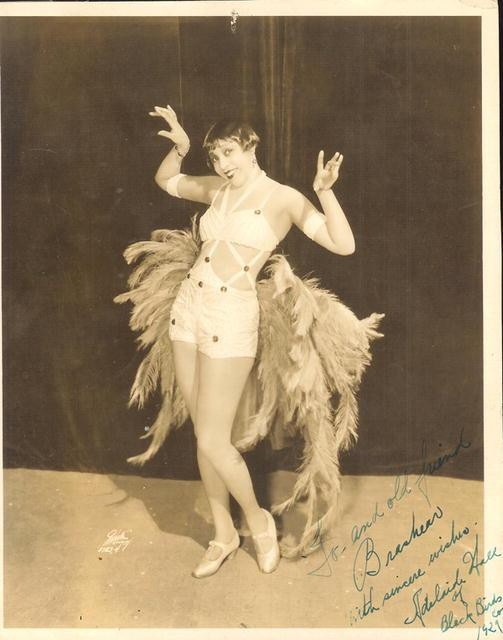
Adelaide Hall in Blackbirds of 1928

Kern, George S. Kaufman, George M. Cohan, and brothers George and Ira Gershwin produced several of the Liberty's shows in the early 1920s. The Kern musical The Night Boat opened at the Liberty in February 1920 and ran for several months. It was followed by George White's Scandals of 1921 and the Otto Harbach musical The O'Brien Girl. During 1922, the Liberty Theatre hosted the comedy To the Ladies with Helen Hayes, as well as Cohan's musical Little Nellie Kelly. The theater's shows the next year included the play Magnolia with Leo Carrillo and The Magic Ring with Jeanette MacDonald. The firm of Mandelbaum & Lewine, along with Max N. Natanson, bought the Liberty and Eltinge theaters in November 1923 and immediately resold the theaters to Maximilian Zipkes. The Liberty hosted another Cohan musical at the end of that year, The Rise of Rosie O'Reilly, although Cohan's musicals had begun to decline in popularity by then. The Gershwins' musical Lady, Be Good! opened at the theater in December 1924 and lasted 330 performances. This was followed in December 1925 by another Gershwin musical, Tip-Toes, which lasted for 194 performances.

Erlanger announced in April 1926 that the Liberty Theatre would be completely renovated after Tip-Toes ended that June, and the theater reopened that September. Lew Fields's revue Blackbirds of 1928, featuring an all-Black cast, premiered in May 1928 and had 518 total performances over two theaters. It was one of several revues with Black casts to be presented at the Liberty Theatre in the late 1920s and early 1930s. Blackbirds relocated to the Eltinge Theatre in October 1928 to make way for the comedy Mr. Moneypenny, which lasted 61 performances. The Liberty then hosted Subway Express, which premiered in October 1929 and ran for 270 performances. By then, increasing competition between producers had resulted in many flops. Furthermore, with the onset of the Great Depression, many Broadway theaters were impacted by declining attendance.

The theater hosted a series of short-lived plays and musicals in early 1930, including the Theatre Guild's revival of the play Volpone. The musical comedy Brown Buddies opened at the Liberty that October, running for 113 performances. Brown Buddies was the theater's last successful production. Erlanger died in March 1930, and the executors of his estate continued to operate the theater, but due to financial shortfalls, most of the estate was ultimately given away to various creditors. 234 West 42nd Street Inc., which Klaw and Erlanger had formed to manage the Liberty Theatre, was evicted from the theater in 1931 after failing to pay rent. The theater hosted another all-Black revue in 1931, Singin' the Blues, which was unsuccessful. Max Rudnick leased the theater in February 1932 for three years and presented the Black revue Blackberries of 1932 that April. Rudnick also presented movies in the theater, and he began showing vaudeville as well in mid-1932, when he presented a 20-act revue entitled Folies Bergere. The theater presented only two legitimate shows during the 1932–1933 season. Masks and Faces, which closed on its opening night in March 1933, was the last legitimate show staged at the Liberty until the 1990s.

=== Movie theater and decline ===
After Masks and Faces closed, the Liberty continued to operate as a movie theater. This was part of a decline in the Broadway theater industry in the mid-20th century; from 1931 to 1950, the number of legitimate theaters decreased from 68 to 30. The Liberty's owner, the Daniel Holding Corporation, agreed to lease the theater to William Brandt in 1933. That lease was not officially recorded until 1938, when Brandt leased the Liberty to 229 West 42nd Street Inc. The Liberty Theatre's operators screened second runs of Warner Bros. films that had premiered at the Times Theatre, on Eighth Avenue and 42nd Street.

The Brandt family acquired the Liberty Theatre, along with the neighboring Eltinge (now Empire) Theatre, in December 1944. By the mid-1940s, the ten theaters along 42nd Street between Seventh and Eighth Avenues were all showing movies; this led Variety to call the block the "biggest movie center of the world". The Brandt family operated seven of these theaters, while the Cinema circuit operated the other three. The Brandt theaters included the Selwyn, Apollo, Times Square, Lyric, and Victory theaters on the north side of 42nd Street, as well as the Eltinge and Liberty theaters on the south side. The Liberty Theatre screened films that had previously been shown at the Selwyn. Several producers offered to stage legitimate productions in the Brandt theaters, but none of the offers were successful.

William Brandt said in 1953 that any of his 42nd Street theaters could be converted to legitimate houses within 24 hours' notice, but producers did not take up his offer. By the late 1950s, the Liberty was classified as a "reissue house", displaying reruns of films and changing its offerings twice a week. Tickets cost 25 to 65 cents apiece, the cheapest admission scale for any theater on 42nd Street. The Liberty and the other 42nd Street theaters operated from 8 a.m. to 3 a.m., with three shifts of workers. The ten theaters on the block attracted about five million visitors a year between them.

The 42nd Street Company was established in 1961 to operate the Brandts' seven theaters on 42nd Street. By the early 1960s, the surrounding block had decayed, but many of the old theater buildings from the block's heyday remained, including the Liberty. Martin Levine and Richard Brandt took over the 42nd Street Company in 1972. At the time, the Liberty was presenting "subrun action fare", showing second runs of action films that had premiered at other theaters. The other six theaters showed a variety of genres, though Levine said none of the company's 42nd Street theaters showed hardcore porn. The Brandts' theaters had a combined annual gross of about $2 million and operated nearly the entire day. However, the area was in decline; the Brandts' theaters only had three million visitors by 1977, about half of the number in 1963. The Brandts' movie theaters on 42nd Street continued to operate through the mid-1980s, at which point the Liberty was showing horror films.

=== Redevelopment ===
==== Preservation attempts ====
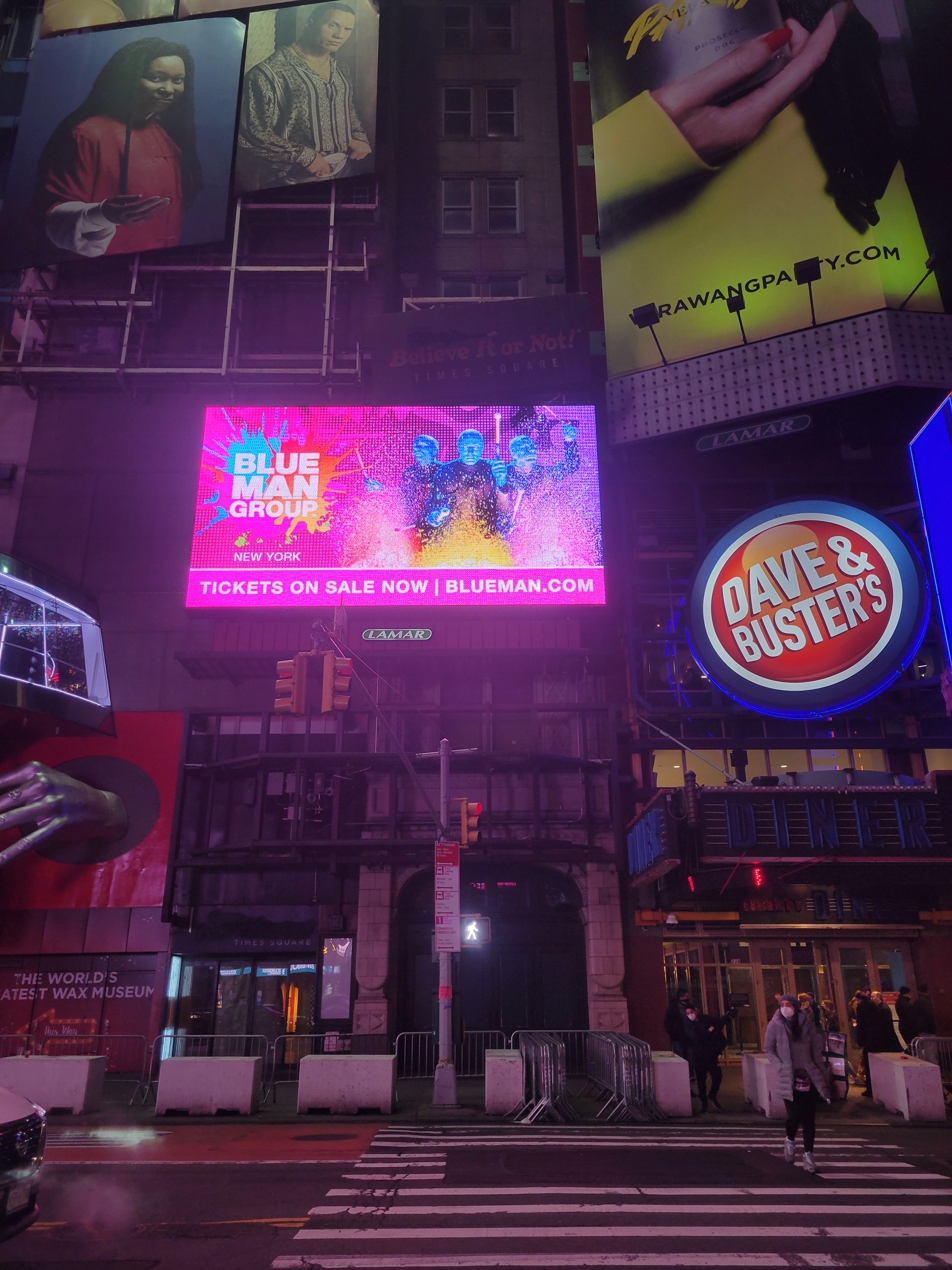
The Liberty's modern facade, seen here in 2021, is obscured behind several billboards.

The 42nd Street Development Corporation had been formed in 1976 to discuss plans for redeveloping Times Square. The same year, the City University of New York's Graduate Center hosted an exhibition with photographs of the Liberty and other theaters to advocate for the area's restoration. One plan for the site, in 1978, called for razing several buildings in the area, including the Liberty, to create a park. The New York City government announced the City at 42nd Street plan in December 1979 as part of a proposal to restore the section of West 42nd Street around Times Square. Under the plan, five theaters would be converted back to legitimate use, and the facades of three other theaters, including the Liberty, would be restored. The Liberty's large stage made it suitable for dance companies. Mayor Ed Koch wavered in his support of the plan, criticizing it as a "Disneyland on 42nd Street".

Subsequently, Hugh Hardy conducted a report on 42nd Street's theaters in 1980. His report, in conjunction with a movement opposing the demolition of the nearby Helen Hayes and Morosco theaters, motivated the New York City Landmarks Preservation Commission (LPC) to survey fifty of Midtown Manhattan's extant theaters in the early 1980s. Hardy's firm Hardy Holzman Pfeiffer Associates (HHPA) determined that the Liberty's superstructure and the decorative plasterwork were still intact. However, the stage facilities were extremely rundown, and HHPA estimated that the theater required at least $2 million worth of restoration. In addition, the facade was deteriorating; the Liberty Bell and bald-eagle decorations had been removed from the facade, and a plain marquee had been placed in front of the theater's facade.

The LPC started to consider protecting theaters, including the Liberty Theatre, as landmarks in 1982, with discussions continuing over the next several years. While the LPC granted landmark status to many Broadway theaters starting in 1987, it deferred decisions on the exterior and interior of the Liberty Theatre. Further discussion of the landmark designations was delayed for several decades. In late 2015, the LPC hosted public hearings on whether to designate the Liberty and six other theaters as landmarks. The LPC rejected the designations in February 2016 because the theaters were already subject to historic-preservation regulations set by the state government.

==== Early redevelopment proposals ====
The Urban Development Corporation (UDC), an agency of the New York state government, proposed redeveloping the area around a portion of West 42nd Street in 1981. The plan centered around four towers that were to be built at 42nd Street's intersections with Broadway and Seventh Avenue, developed by Park Tower Realty and the Prudential Insurance Company of America. (Note: The sites were: Northwest corner of 42nd Street and Seventh Avenue: now 3 Times Square; Northeast corner of 42nd Street and Broadway: now 4 Times Square; Southwest corner of 42nd Street and Seventh Avenue: now 5 Times Square; South side of 42nd Street between Seventh Avenue and Broadway: now 7 Times Square (Times Square Tower)) The Brandt family planned to submit a bid to redevelop some of the theaters they owned on 42nd Street. In June 1982, the Brandts' five theaters on the north side of 42nd Street were added to the redevelopment plan. Despite the Brandts' insistence that the Empire and Liberty theaters also be included in the redevelopment, the two theaters were leased to New York Mart Inc. as part of a separate plan. Ultimately, the 42nd Street Redevelopment Project was delayed for several years due to lawsuits and disputes concerning the towers.

The New York Mart plan consisted of a garment merchandise mart on Eighth Avenue between 40th and 42nd Streets, opposite Port Authority Bus Terminal. The project was to be completed by the Times Square Redevelopment Corporation, comprising members of the New York state and city governments. Under this plan, the Empire and Liberty theaters would be renovated, with the Liberty Theatre likely becoming a nonprofit theater, although the extent of the renovations was unclear. David Morse and Richard Reinis were selected in April 1982 to develop the mart, but they were removed from the project that November due to funding issues. Subsequently, the state and city disputed over the replacement development team, leading the city to withdraw from the partnership in August 1983. The state and city reached a compromise on the development team that October, wherein the mart would be developed by Tishman Speyer, operated by Trammell Crow, and funded by Equitable Life Assurance.

The Brandts leased all their movie theaters on 42nd Street, including the Liberty, to the Cine 42nd Street Corporation in 1986. The Liberty Theatre was still part of the mart project in 1987. Though the theater was tentatively slated to be used as a nonprofit performing-arts theater, the city and state governments had not reached an agreement with private developers regarding the mart. The merchandise mart was ultimately never built; the northern part of the site became 11 Times Square, while the southern part became the New York Times Building. A committee of theatrical experts recommended in 1987 that the Victory and Liberty theaters be restored for nonprofit use; they estimated that it would cost between $7 million and $7.8 million to renovate the Liberty. City and state officials announced plans for the Liberty Theatre, along with five theaters on the north side of 42nd Street, in September 1988. The UDC opened a request for proposals for the six theaters that October. The Liberty and Victory were to be converted into performing-arts venues for nonprofit organizations, while the Selwyn, Apollo, Lyric, and Times Square were to be converted to commercial use. By the end of the year, the plans were threatened by a lack of money.

In early 1989, several dozen nonprofit theater companies submitted plans to the UDC for the takeover of six theaters. Most of the bids were for the Liberty and Victory, but the Selwyn, Apollo, Lyric, and Times Square theaters received 13 bids between them. That year, The Durst Organization acquired the leases to eight theaters in Times Square, including the Victory. It subsequently announced plans to renovate the eight theaters in February 1990. The New York state government acquired the theater sites that April via eminent domain. The city had planned to buy out the theaters' leases but withdrew after the 42nd Street Company indicated it would lease the theaters to another developer. Although Durst protested the move, a New York Supreme Court judge ruled that the sites could be acquired by condemnation.

==== New 42nd Street control ====
A nonprofit organization, New 42nd Street, was formed in September 1990 to restore six theaters, including the Liberty, and find uses for them. Government officials hoped that development of the theaters would finally allow the construction of the four towers around 42nd Street, Broadway, and Seventh Avenue. In 1992, New 42nd Street received $18.2 million for restoring the six theaters as part of an agreement with Prudential and Park Tower. Meanwhile, the Liberty continued to deteriorate, leading theatrical critic Mel Gussow to write in 1990 that the orchestra level had been "almost entirely reduced to rubble". The interior of the theater caught fire the same year and was nearly destroyed. The asbestos curtain was still intact but was extremely rundown, as The New York Times observed: "The bottom part [of the curtain] trails on the stage and is damaged by trash and plywood stacked there." Even as the estimated renovation cost increased to $16 million, the Times still predicted in 1992 that the Liberty and Victory were "most likely to be renovated".

After Disney committed to restoring the New Amsterdam Theatre in 1994, most of the other theaters around 42nd Street were quickly leased. By 1995, real-estate development firm Forest City Ratner was planning a $150 million entertainment and retail complex on the site of the Empire, Harris, and Liberty theaters. Madame Tussauds and AMC leased space in the complex that July. Madame Tussauds would occupy the eastern section of the site, using the entrance of the former Harris Theatre, while AMC would occupy the western section, with the Empire's facade being relocated westward. Forest City Ratner leased the Liberty from New 42nd Street, although the development company did not use the theater itself. Though the theater was not protected as a city landmark, the city and state governments had required that significant portions of the facade be preserved. The Liberty was used for a staged reading of T. S. Eliot's poem The Waste Land, a solo performance by Fiona Shaw, in late 1996. The same year, GameWorks negotiated with Forest City Ratner to open a virtual-reality arcade in the theater, although the Liberty remained empty through the late 1990s. Forest City Ratner erected a Hilton hotel above the theater.

The Liberty Theatre remained largely abandoned in the 2000s, and its facade and auditorium were hidden behind Madame Tussauds' entrance. The theater was briefly used for Deborah Warner's site-specific art installation The Angel Project in 2003; at the time, Warner called it the city's "most hidden, anchorite-like, beautiful, walled-upped" building. The Liberty's facade was integrated into the Ripley's Odditorium museum in the mid-2000s, while the auditorium was used by an adjacent Famous Dave's restaurant. The theater was renovated in 2011. The auditorium was converted to a rental event space, and the restaurant portion along 42nd Street became the Liberty Diner. Parts of the auditorium were still visible from the restaurant. During 2015, Cynthia von Buhler staged the immersive play Speakeasy Dollhouse: Ziegfeld's Midnight Frolic, whose storyline investigates the death of actress Olive Thomas, at the theater. The Liberty Diner and the auditorium closed after the operators lost the lease in 2015.

Brookfield Asset Management took over Forest City's properties at the end of 2018. Ripley's closed permanently in 2021 due to the COVID-19 pandemic, and real-estate agency Cushman and Wakefield was marketing the Liberty Theatre for lease. During late 2022, the Terror Haunted House operated within the space formerly used for Ripley's. The theater was then leased in October 2024 to Broadway 4D for an entertainment attraction.

== Notable productions ==
Productions are listed by the year of their first performance. This list only includes Broadway shows; it does not include films screened there.

Notable productions at the theater
| Opening year | Name | Refs. |
|---|---|---|
| 1904 | Little Johnny Jones | |
| 1905 | The Taming of the Shrew | |
| 1905 | The School for Scandal | |
| 1905 | The Education of Mr. Pipp | |
| 1905 | The Gingerbread Man | |
| 1906 | The Clansman | |
| 1906 | Lincoln | |
| 1906 | Nurse Marjorie | |
| 1907 | Salomy Jane | |
| 1907 | Merely Mary Ann | |
| 1907 | Ziegfeld Follies of 1907 | |
| 1907 | Polly of the Circus | |
| 1907 | Lola from Berlin | |
| 1908 | The Traveling Salesman | |
| 1910 | The Arcadians | |
| 1911 | The Fascinating Widow | |
| 1911 | The Littlest Rebel | |
| 1912 | Milestones | |
| 1913 | Rob Roy | |
| 1913 | Sweethearts | |
| 1914 | General John Regan | |
| 1914 | Sari | |
| 1914 | Lady Windermere's Fan | |
| 1914 | He Comes Up Smiling | |
| 1914 | Pygmalion | |
| 1914 | Twelfth Night | |
| 1914 | The Silent Voice | |
| 1917 | The Imaginary Invalid | |
| 1917 | Hitchy-Koo of 1917 | |
| 1917 | Going Up | |
| 1919 | George White's Scandals (1919) | |
| 1919 | Hitchy-Koo of 1919 | |
| 1919 | Caesar's Wife | |
| 1920 | The Night Boat | |
| 1921 | George White's Scandals (1921) | |
| 1922 | To the Ladies | |
| 1922 | Little Nellie Kelly | |
| 1924 | Lady, Be Good! | |
| 1925 | The City Chap | |
| 1925 | Tip-Toes | |
| 1928 | Blackbirds of 1928 | |
| 1929 | Subway Express | |
| 1930 | Volpone | |
| 1930 | Brown Buddies | |
| 1932 | Cradle Snatchers | |
| 1933 | Masks and Faces | |

== See also ==
- List of Broadway theaters
