= Brown Buddies =

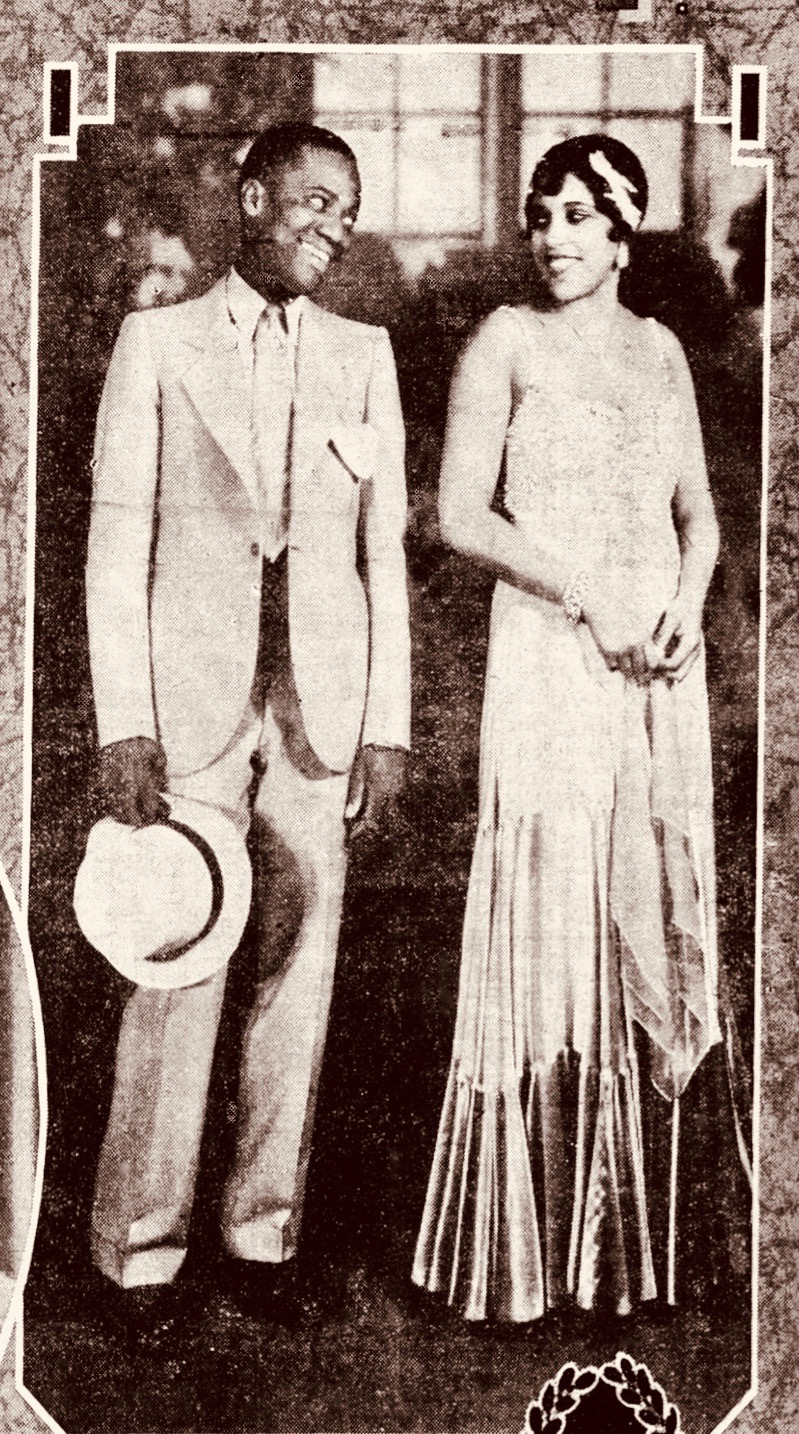
Adelaide Hall and Bill "Bojangles" Robinson in Brown Buddies

Brown Buddies was a musical comedy staged with dancer Bill Bojangles and singer Adelaide Hall starring. It opened on Broadway at the Liberty Theatre where it ran for four months before commencing a road tour in the United States. Dubbed by the press "a musical comedy in sepia", the core of the music was composed by Millard Thomas. Songs by Shelton Brooks, Ned Reed, Porter Grainger, J. C. Johnson, J. Rosamond Johnson, George A. Little, Arthur Sizemore and Edward G. Nelson also featured. After an out-of-town try-out, the musical opened on October 7, 1930, at the Liberty Theatre, New York, where it ran a fairly solid run of 111 performances until January 10, 1931.
