= Variety in Sepia =

1947 BBC television variety show

- Genre: Variety Show
- Created by: BBC
- Composer: Various
- Country of origin: United Kingdom
- Original language: English
- No. of episodes: 3

Production
- Producer: Eric Fawcett
- Production locations: Radiolympia, London
- Running time: 60 minutes
- Production company: BBC

Original release
- Network: BBC TV
- Release: 7 October – 9 October 1947

Variety in Sepia is a television Variety special that was broadcast live on BBC TV on 7 October 1947 from the RadiOlympia Theatre, Alexandra Palace, London.

== Historical significance ==
Variety in Sepia is significant to television history for several reasons: it was an early example of a television special dedicated to Black talent, it was an early example of a live television broadcast and it is one of the earliest surviving telerecordings. A six-minute fragment of the programme is all that exists and is thought to be the earliest surviving recording of a live BBC TV programme (apart from some silent off-air fragments from the 1930s).

The fragment features Brooklyn-born singer Adelaide Hall performing two songs: "Chi-Baba, Chi-Baba (My Bambino Go to Sleep)", written by Mack David, Jerry Livingston and Al Hoffman, and "I Can't Give You Anything But Love, Baby", written by Jimmy McHugh and Dorothy Fields. The surviving footage of Adelaide Hall may also be the earliest surviving recording of an African American performing on British television.

== Cast ==
Cast in order of appearance:

- Vroom and his dancers
- Mable Lee
- Evelyn Dove
- Edric Connor
- The George Williams Choir
- Cyril Blake and his Calypso Band
- Buddy Bradley
- The Business Men of Rhythm
- Winifred Atwell
- Woods and Jarrett
- Adelaide Hall

== Production credits ==
- Musical accompaniments by Eric Robinson and his Orchestra
- Settings by Stephen Bundy
- Produced by Eric Fawcett
- Filmed live from Radiolympia

== Scheduling ==
The programme was aired twice in 1947, on 7 October and again on 9 October. The first transmission appeared on a schedule that also included Fashions Round the World, Come and Be Televised, and The Eye of the Artist.

The surviving six-minute fragment of the show featuring footage of Adelaide Hall was shown on BBC2 television on 1 July 1992.

=== 1992 rediscovery of Variety in Sepia ===
The BBC did not use telerecording regularly until around 1955. It was fortuitous that during the research for a BFI project for the documentary Black and White in Colour (1992) that the British writer and archivist Stephen Bourne discovered the 35mm film of Variety in Sepia. The footage had been captured (on 35mm) and filmed directly from a television screen by the BBC as an "experimental telerecording" and had lain forgotten in the BBC Archive for more than 40 years. The documentary, Black and White in Colour, is a two-part film made by the British Film Institute for the BBC and is a retrospective that looks at the contribution of Black and Asian people in British TV from the birth of television in 1936 to 1992. The film details the representation of Black and Asian people on television and makes reference to the wider context of cultural, political and social events. The film is directed by Isaac Julien and narrated by Professor Stuart Hall.

=== 2011 Alexandra Palace screening ===
On Wednesday 14 September 2011, the BFI (British Film Institute) held an event called Georgian Television at Alexandra Palace, whereVariety in Sepia was filmed in 1947. The event was organised to celebrate the anniversary (in November 2011) of the start of the BBC Television Service and aimed to "give a glimpse into the early years of British television with a specially compiled selection of most of the surviving (non-news) footage from the small screen, prior to the Coronation in 1953. Highlights during the event included footage of George Bernard Shaw on his 90th birthday (filmed in 1946), Variety in Sepia featuring Adelaide Hall (filmed in 1947), an experimental telerecording of radio's flagship comedy show of the time ITMA (It's That Man Again) and scenes from the 1948 Olympics." The programme lasted 90 minutes.
