= George Dewey Washington =

American singer

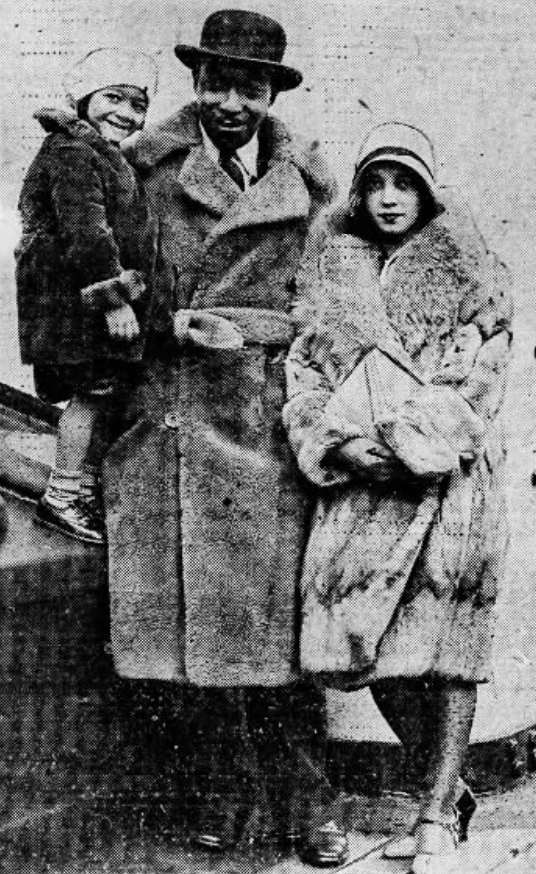
- Washington with wife Marie and daughter Betty Jean, from a 1930 newspaper
- Born: 1898
- Died: 1954 (aged 55–56)
- Occupations: Baritone singer, vaudeville performer

George Dewey Washington (1898–1954) was an American singer active in vaudeville and motion pictures from the 1920s through the 1940s. He was a baritone or bass-baritone who often appeared on stage in the guise of "The Gentleman Tramp". He was sometimes compared to Al Jolson.

Before he became a professional entertainer, Washington worked as a waiter in railroad dining cars, often singing amid noises of the train. Washington was married and had a daughter.

Washington appeared in a number of short films for M-G-M and Paramount Pictures from 1928 to 1932, the early years of "talkies", including some of M-G-M's first musical shorts. At one point, he played three weeks in a row at the Paramount Theatre on Broadway. He was described at the time as a "hot favorite" with a "sympathetic voice [that] goes straight to the heart" and that is "well adapted for the talkies".

In 1933, Washington performed on Broadway in Strike Me Pink, which was "staged as an epic review of black history. Night clubs in which Washington performed include the California Theatre Club in San Francisco and the Club Casino in the Oakland neighborhood of Pittsburgh, Pennsylvania. He also appeared on the bill with films in theaters including the Paramount Theater in Los Angeles.

Washington performed for the fifth Cavalcade of Jazz concert held at Wrigley Field in Los Angeles which was produced by Leon Hefflin, Sr. on July 10, 1949. He was featured along with Lionel Hampton and his Orchestra, Jimmy Witherspoon, Buddy Banks and his Orchestra and Big Jay McNeely.

== Discography ==
Washington recorded a number of 10-inch discs for Columbia Records between 1928 and 1930, all as a soloist with an orchestra or ensemble, including:

- "The Spell of the Blues"
- "The Sun is at My Window (Throwing Kisses at Me)"
- "I'll Never Ask for More"
- "Lonely Vagabond"
- "Poor Punchinello"
- "(Step by Step — Mile by Mile) I'm Marching Home to You"
- "High Water"
- "Dreary Night"
- "Signs of the Highway"
- "The Fool's Parade"
