= List of female entertainers of the Harlem Renaissance =

This is a list of female entertainers of the Harlem Renaissance, a cultural, social, and artistic explosion that took place in Harlem, New York, in the 1920s.

== Dancers, choreographers, and orchestra leaders ==
- Hallie Anderson
- Josephine Baker
- Anita Bush
- Olga Burgoyne
- Ida Forsyne
- Aurora Greely
- Norma Miller
- Aida Overton Walker
- Elisabeth Welch

== Singers and musicians ==
- Gladys Bentley
- May Alix
- Marian Anderson
- Lil Hardin Armstrong
- Lovie Austin
- Ada Brown
- Lillyn Brown
- Blanche Calloway
- Minto Cato
- Juanita Stinnette Chappelle
- Inez Clough
- Ida Cox
- Ruby Elzy
- Adelaide Hall
- Hazel Harrison
- Lucille Hegamin
- Bertha Hill
- Mattie Hite
- Billie Holiday
- Lena Horne
- Alberta Hunter
- Caterina Jarboro
- Matilda Sissieretta Joyner Jones
- Sara Martin
- Rose McClendon
- Viola McCoy
- Florence Mills
- Ma Rainey
- Bessie Smith
- Mamie Smith
- Trixie Smith
- Valaida Snow
- Victoria Spivey
- Florence Cole Talbert
- Eva Taylor
- Big Mama Thornton
- Sippie Wallace
- Whitman Sisters
- Edith Wilson
- Lena Wilson

== Actresses and entertainers ==
- Etta Moten Barnett
- Louise Beavers
- Gladys Bentley
- Birleanna Blanks
- Laura Bowman
- Blanche Dunn
- Evelyn Ellis
- Mercedes Gilbert
- Gertrude Howard
- Moms Mabley
- Nina Mae McKinney
- Ethel Moses
- Evelyn Preer
- Gertrude Saunders
- Ada "Bricktop" Smith
- Madame Sul-Te-Wan
- Fredi Washington
- Ethel Waters
