= Plantation Revue =

1920s musical revue

Plantation Revue was a 1922 revue put together by Lew Leslie, featuring some of the more popular musical numbers and comedy acts that he had hired at Harlem's Plantation Club.

The original revue underwent other versions, with minor or major changes to the cast: Dover Street to Dixie (pairing-up with a British production in London); Dixie to Broadway (pairing-up with a one-act white revue) and Dixie to Paris.

== Plantation Revue ==
Performers included Florence Mills, around whom the revue was built, and who would become an even bigger star thanks to this revue, her husband, U. S. Thompson, and blues star Edith Wilson. Shelton Brooks was hired as the emcee, as well as himself performing in the revue.

As well as for its initial Broadway run, Brooks, Mills, Thompson, and Wilson all continued performing in future versions of the show: its pairing-up with a British production, Dover Street to Dixie, in London, and the pairing-up with a one-act white revue, Dixie to Broadway, on Times Square. All four also went on to perform in Lew Leslie's Blackbirds of 1926.

Leslie brought Aaron Palmer over from Whitman Sisters' Troupe to join the ensemble, for which he teamed up with another dancer. Their act, together with those of U. S. Thompson and Lou Keane, made up the Plantation Revue's dance acts.

=== Dover Street to Dixie (1923) ===
Leslie arranged with English impresario C. B. Cochran to take half the cast of the Plantation Revue, as the Dixie part, staged by Leonard Harper, to London, with Stanley Lupino and Odette Myrtil making up the London-based half of the show. Vaudeville blues singers Gladys Bryant and Lena Wilson were also a part of the London revue tour but received no mention in British publications.

=== Dixie to Broadway (1924–1925) ===
Following a shake-out tour, Dixie to Broadway ran for 77 performances at the Broadhurst Theatre, in Times Square, starting 29 October 1924, before touring the USA again. It featured Hamtree Harrington and Cora Green, Will Vodery, as musical director, and his Orchestra, tap dancers Willie Covan & Ulysses "Slow Kid" Thompson, whom Variety described as "Effortless steppers who mix some light trick stuff in with soft-shoe rhythmatics". Johnnie Nit, Aida Ward, and Eddie Rector.

With Florence Mills, as usual as the star attraction, Dixie to Broadway featured her singing "I'm a Little Blackbird Looking for a Bluebird", with lyrics by Grant Clarke and Roy Turk, and music by Tin Pan Alley songwriter George W. Meyer, and Arthur Johnston. which, a couple of months later (17 December 1924), would first be recorded for the OKeh label by Eva Taylor, accompanied by Clarence Williams’ Blue Five (Clarence Williams (piano); Louis Armstrong (cornet); Charlie Irvis (trombone); Sidney Bechet (soprano saxophone), and Buddy Christian (banjo).

== See also ==
- Blackbirds of 1928
