= Gladys Bryant =

- 1923 passport photo

Background information
- Born: Gladys Lillian Bryant; December 21, 1901; Aiken, South Carolina, U.S.
- Died: unknown
- Genres: Blues
- Occupations: Singer, performer
- Label: Paramount Records
- Spouse: Arthur Bryson

Gladys Lillian Bryant (December 21, 1901 – date of death unknown) was an American blues singer and vaudeville performer.

She was born in Aiken, South Carolina, in 1901 or possibly 1902. She first came to notice as a singer in 1922, in the chorus of Plantation Revue, produced by Lew Leslie and starring Florence Mills. The following year, she traveled to England with Mills and company to appear in the revue From Dover Street to Dixie, and, along with Edith Wilson, was one of the first to sing blues in Britain. Also in 1923, she recorded six songs for Paramount Records, including "Tired O' Waitin' Blues" and "Laughin’ Cryin’ Blues", with Porter Grainger; on other tracks she was accompanied by Fletcher Henderson.

She married dancer Arthur Bryson in Manhattan in 1924, and made no further recordings. By 1930 she was living with her mother in Manhattan. Her later life is uncertain, although she reportedly appeared on Groucho Marx's television show You Bet Your Life in 1952, when she is said to have been "the first person to perform the blues on television".
