= Blackbirds of 1933 =

- Music: Various
- Lyrics: Various
- Book: Nat N. Dorfman; Mann Holiner; Lew Leslie
- Basis: Blackbirds of 1928 by Jimmy McHugh; Dorothy Fields
- Productions: 1933 Broadway

Blackbirds of 1933 is a musical revue with a book by Nat N. Dorfman, Mann Holiner, and Lew Leslie. It is a sequel to Blackbirds of 1928. The original production premiered on December 2, 1933 at the Apollo Theatre in New York.

The musical features music and lyrics by Mann Holiner, Alberta Nichols, Ned Washington, Joseph Young and Victor Young. It also featured the premiere of the Joseph Young/Ned Washington's standard "A Hundred Years From Today."

== Production history ==
The original Broadway production opened at Apollo Theater on December 2, 1933 and ran for 25 performances. It was staged by Lew Leslie and featured scenic design by Mabel A. Buell. The opening night cast featured James Thomas Boxwill, Pike Davis' Continental Orchestra, Eddie Hunter, Brady Jackson, John Mason, Blue McAllister, Lionel Monagas, Kathryn Perry, Speedy Smith, Slappy Wallace, Henry Williams, Edith Wilson and Worthy & Thompson.

== Musical numbers ==
- "A Hundred Years from Today"
- "Memories of You" By Andy Razaf and Eubie Blake.
