= Ulysses "Slow Kid" Thompson =

American comedian, singer and dancer (1888–1990)

- Born: Ulysses Thompson; August 28, 1888; Prescott, Arkansas, U.S.
- Died: March 17, 1990 (aged 101); Little Rock, Arkansas, U.S.
- Resting place: Little Rock National Cemetery in Little Rock, Arkansas
- Other names: Kid Thompson; Slow Kid Thompson; Ulysses S. Thompson; U.S. Thompson
- Occupations: Singer, dancer, comedian, promoter, and conductor
- Years active: 1902–69
- Spouse: Florence Mills (m. 1921; died 1927)
- Parent(s): George Washington Thompson and Hanna Pandora Driver

Ulysses "Slow Kid" Thompson (August 28, 1888 – March 17, 1990) was a comedian, singer, tap and acrobatic dancer whose nickname was inspired by his ability to perform a comical, and incredibly slow, dance routine. His career included work in circus, medicine shows, minstrel shows, vaudeville, and Broadway.

== Early years ==
Ulysses Thompson was born in Prescott, Arkansas, to George Washington Thompson and Hanna Pandora Driver. His mother died of typhus when Thompson was seven years old, and he ran away from home at age fourteen. Initially, he worked in positions of traditional labor, but he obtained the early skills of an entertainer while dancing in the street for nickels and dimes. His experiences led to a job performing a Juba dance in a traveling medicine show. Thompson would dance and tell jokes, providing entertainment to the crowds who came to see the "doctor." Common during that period of American history, medicine shows provided many young men with an opportunity to develop more professional skills.

By the winter of 1904, Thompson was working in Louisiana for The Mighty Haag Circus. Over the next few years, he worked for Patterson's World Carnival, Heger and Hopper Stock Shows, the Sells Floto Circus, the Gentry Brothers Dog and Pony Show, the Hagenbeck-Wallace Circus, and the Ringling Brothers Circus.

At the end of Ringling Brothers' 1915 season, he joined Ralph Dunbar's Tennessee Ten on the Keith-Proctor circuit. His tap dancing and acrobatic skills were said to be exceptional, and he was considered to be a master of slow-motion dance. It was as dance director for the Tennessee Ten that he met the young singer and dancer Florence Mills.

== Military service ==
In 1918, Thompson was drafted by the U.S. Army. He served with the 5th Army, 92nd Infantry Division, 366th Regiment in France during World War I with the military classification of Musician 3rd Class. In that position, he entertained the troops by performing as drum major in the Army's band.

== Career highlights ==
Upon his return to the United States in 1919, Thompson visited relatives in Hot Springs, Arkansas, before rejoining the Tennessee Ten for five more seasons, working forty weeks a year.

In 1921, Thompson married Florence Mills in New York, and in 1922, the couple joined the cast of Noble Sissle and Eubie Blake's Shuffle Along. They also worked together at the Plantation Club as members of Lew Leslie's Plantation Revue, which starred Mills. Traveling to London, they performed together in C.B. Cochran's Dover Street to Dixie, and in Paris they performed in Dixie to Paris, before returning to New York to join Dixie to Broadway.

In 1926, they returned to Paris for Lew Leslie's Blackbirds of 1926 with Mills as the star attraction and Thompson as a featured dancer. Upon recognizing her talent was greater than his own, Thompson subjugated his career to be her manager and promoter.

When his wife became sick in 1927 and died of a tuberculosis-related disease, Thompson was distraught, but he worked hard to revive his former career as a dancer.

The 1930s saw him performing worldwide as a tap dancer in such distant places as Auckland and Wellington, New Zealand; Bucharest, Romania; Budapest, Hungary; Berlin, Germany; Bombay, India; Manila, Philippines; Shanghai and Hong Kong, China; Hawaii; Cuba; and Australia, where he made three tours under the management of George Sorlie.

On August 21, 1946, in Las Vegas, Thompson married again, to Dr. Gertrude Curtis, noted in her own right as New York's first black woman dentist. She herself was the widow of lyricist Cecil Mack who contributed the words for many Williams and Walker Show tunes. Thompson continued to be active in the entertainment industry until approximately 1969.

== Death ==
Thompson lived to the age of 101. In his later years, he lived at a nursing home in Little Rock. He died on March 17, 1990, at the home of a relative in that city. His burial was in Little Rock National Cemetery.
