= I Can't Give You Anything but Love, Baby =

1928 song by Jimmy McHugh and Dorothy Fields

- Sheet music, 1928

Song by Jimmy McHugh and Dorothy Fields
- Published: 1928 by Jack Mills Music
- Released: 1928
- Recorded: 1928
- Genre: Jazz
- Songwriter: Dorothy Fields
- Composer: Jimmy McHugh
- Producer: Jimmy McHugh

"I Can't Give You Anything but Love, Baby" is an American popular song and jazz standard by Jimmy McHugh (music) and Dorothy Fields (lyrics). The song was introduced by Adelaide Hall at Les Ambassadeurs Club in New York in January 1928 in Lew Leslie's Blackbird Revue, which opened on Broadway later that year as the highly successful Blackbirds of 1928 (which ran for 518 performances), wherein it was performed by Hall, Aida Ward, and Willard McLean.

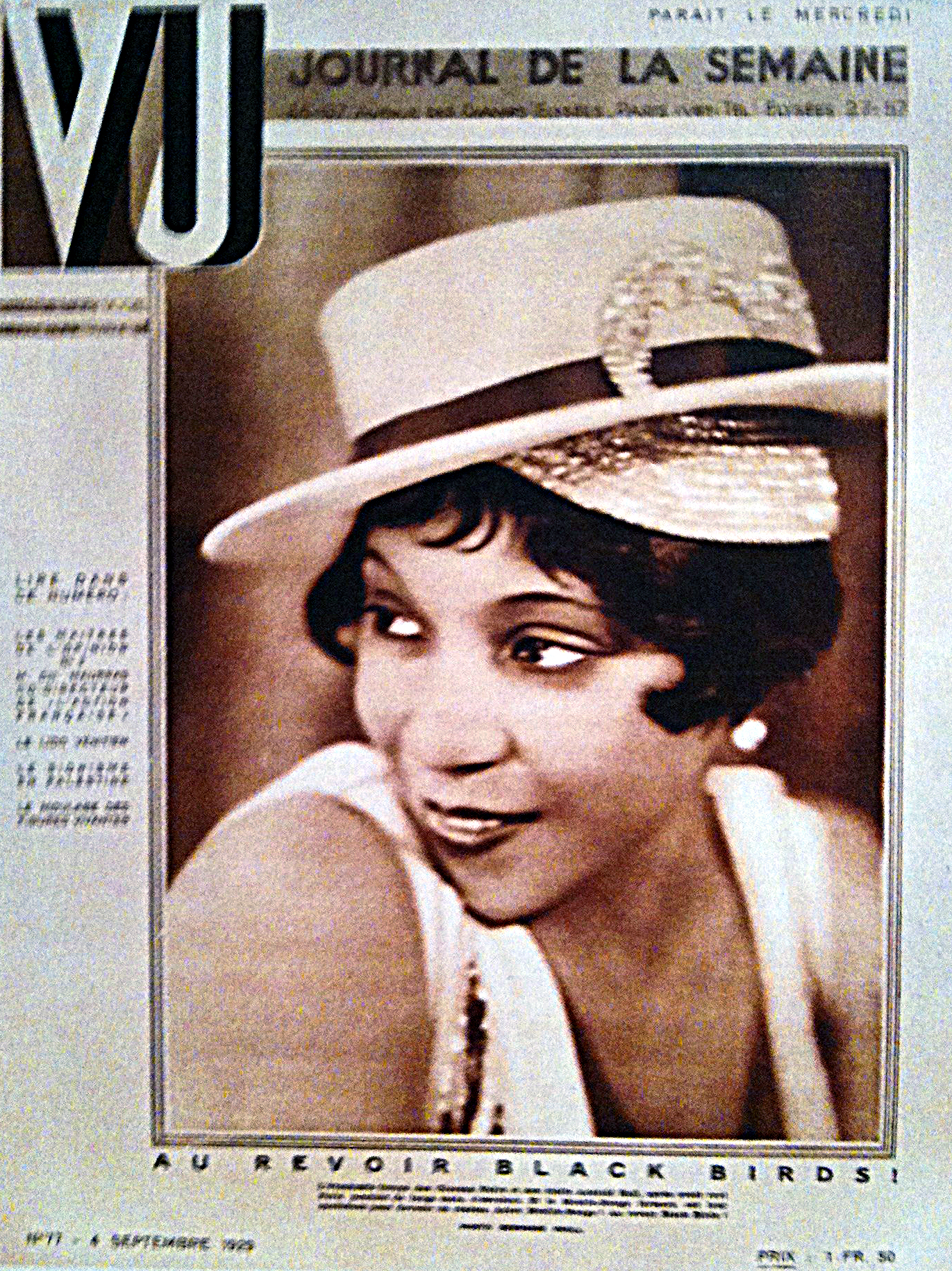
Adelaide Hall on the cover of Vu magazine in 1929

In the 100 most recorded songs from 1890 to 1954, "I Can't Give You Anything But Love, Baby" is No. 24.

The original lyrics and music of the song entered the public domain in the United States in 2024.

== Background ==
Jimmy McHugh and Dorothy Fields had written the score for a revue at Les Ambassadeurs Club on 57th Street, New York, which featured the vocalist Adelaide Hall. However, the producer Lew Leslie believed that they still missed a 'smash' tune. The team pondered for a while before finally playing Leslie "I Can't Give You Anything but Love, Baby". This was the song Leslie had been looking for and he immediately included it in the revue. One advertisement called it "the song success of the Nation."

Blackbird Revue opened on January 4, 1928, with Adelaide Hall singing "I Can't Give You Anything but Love, Baby" solo. Later on, Fields and McHugh wrote a second half for the revue and Leslie expanded the production. With extra songs and extra performers added (including the vocalist Aida Ward), Leslie renamed the revue Blackbirds of 1928 and took the full production for a tryout in Atlantic City, New Jersey, where it appeared at Nixon's Apollo Theatre. On May 9, 1928, Blackbirds of 1928 opened at the Liberty Theatre, Broadway.

The idea behind the song came during a stroll Fields and McHugh were taking one evening down Fifth Avenue; they saw a young couple window-shopping at Tiffany's. McHugh and Fields understood that the couple could not afford to buy jewelry from Tiffany's, but nevertheless they drew closer to them. It was then they heard the man say: "Gee, honey I'd like to get you a sparkler like that, but right now, I can't give you nothin' but love!" Hearing this, McHugh and Fields rushed to a nearby Steinway Tunnel, and within an hour they came up with "I Can't Give You Anything but Love, Baby".

Some controversy surrounds the song's authorship. Andy Razaf's biographer Barry Singer offers circumstantial evidence that suggests Fats Waller might have sold the melody to McHugh in 1926 and that the lyrics were by Andy Razaf. Additionally, Philip Furia has pointed out that Fields' lines for bars 1 to 8 of the verse contain some phrases very similar to those in bars 9 to 16 of the second verse of Lorenz Hart's lyric for the song "Where's That Rainbow?" from the 1926 Rodgers and Hart musical Peggy-Ann (though there is no relationship between the music for the two song verses). Peggy Ann had a book by Fields' brother Herbert and was produced by their father Lew.

== Recorded versions ==
- Mildred Grizelle (released by Gennett Records in 1928 under the New Electrobeam (Black Label) catalog number 6646, with the flip side "Low Down" by Virginia Lee
- Sam Lanin, with vocals provided by Irving Kaufman (May 1928)
- Johnny Hamp's Kentucky Serenaders (vocal by H. White; recorded May 17, 1928, released by Victor as catalog number 21414A, with the flip side "Sweet Lorraine")
- Seger Ellis and his Orchestra (recorded June 8, 1928, released by OKeh as catalog number 41077, with the flip side "Don't Keep Me in the Dark, Bright Eyes"
- The Goofus Five and their Orchestra (recorded June 27, 1928, released by OKeh as catalog number 41069, with the flip side "Ready for the River"
- Gay Ellis (pseudonym for Annette Hanshaw; vocal by Hanshaw, recorded July 24, 1928, released by Harmony as catalog number 706-H and by Supertone as catalog number 1005P, both with the flip side "I Must Have That Man")
- Rube Bloom (recorded August 2, 1928, released by OKeh as catalog number 41117, with the flip side "Because My Baby Don't Mean 'Maybe' Now")
- Okeh released another version the same year, sung by Lillie Delk Christian
- Hollywood Dance Orchestra (recorded August 7, 1928, released by Challenge as catalog number 536, also released by Banner as catalog number 7193; also released under the name Jewel Dance Orchestra by Jewel as catalog number, all with the flip side "Raggedy Maggie"
- Harry Richman (recorded August 28, 1928, released by Brunswick as catalog number 4035, with the flip side "King for a Day")
- Shilkret's Rhyth-Melodists (recorded September 22, 1928, released by Victor as catalog number 21688, with the flip side "I'm Sorry, Sally")
- Duke Ellington and his Orchestra (recorded October 30, 1928, released by Montgomery Ward as catalog number 4990, with the flip side "Memories of You")
- Lee Sims (recorded November 1928, released by Brunswick as catalog number 4152A, with the flip side "Sonny Boy")
- Gene Austin (recorded November 23, 1928, released by Victor as catalog number 21798, with the flip side "I Wonder if You Miss Me Tonight")
- Abe Lyman and his Californians (recorded November 26, 1928, released by Brunswick as catalog number 4136, with the flip side "Baby"
- Ukulele Ike (Cliff Edwards) in New York, Dec. 7, 1928—Columbia 1471-D Columbia 5068
- Louis Armstrong (recorded March 5, 1929, released by Columbia with the flip side "Black and Blue" and with the flip side "Mood Indigo"); also released by OKeh both with the flip side "No One Else but You". For other Louis Armstrong versions, including a 1943 film performance see Ricky Riccardi's treatment of the song. Armstrong had a history of performing this song at the Savoy and Regal before he recorded it.
- Mills Brothers (recorded December 22, 1932, released by Brunswick as catalog number 6519, with the flip side "Diga Diga Doo")
- Ethel Waters with Duke Ellington (recorded December 22, 1932, released by Brunswick as catalog number 6517, with the flip side "Doin' the New Lowdown", and as catalog number 6758, with the flip side "Porgy")
- Bob Wills and his Texas Playboys (recorded September 23, 1935, released by Columbia as catalog number 37703 and by Vocalion as catalog number 03264, both with the flip side "Never No More Blues")
- Billie Holiday (1936)
- Lee O'Daniel Hillbilly Boys (recorded June 10, 1937, released by Vocalion as catalog number 03753, with the flip side "Thank You, Mr. Moon")
- Benny Goodman and his Orchestra (recorded September 6, 1937, released by Victor as catalog number 25678, with the flip side "Sugar Foot Stomp")
- Cootie Williams Rug Cutters (recorded October 26, 1937, released by Vocalion as catalog number 3890, with the flip side "Watching")
- Adelaide Hall accompanied by Fats Waller, HMV, August 28, 1938, London, recorded at Abbey Road Studios, London
- Una Mae Carlisle in a duet with Fats Waller, November 3, 1939, recorded in New York City
- Joe Sullivan (recorded February 9, 1940, released by Conqueror as catalog number 9503 and by Vocalion as catalog number 5496, both with the flip side "Oh, Lady Be Good")
- Benny Goodman Sextet (recorded December 18, 1940, released by Columbia as catalog number 36755, with the flip side "Fiesta in Blue")
- King Cole Quintet (recorded in 1942, released by Disc as catalog number 2011, with the flip side "Pro-Sky")
- Ted Straeter and his Orchestra (recorded March 24, 1942, released by Decca as catalog number 18308B, with the flip side "What Is This Thing Called Love?")
- Glenn Miller and the Army Air Forces Training Command Orchestra recorded the song in 1944 with Peanuts Hucko on vocals, released as V-Disc No. 482A in August 1945
- Jonah Jones Septet (recorded September 4, 1946, released by Prestige as an extended-play disc, catalog number PR-7604 and by Swing Records in France as catalog number 228, with the flip side "That's the Lick")
- Rose Murphy (recorded December 1947, released by Mercury as catalog number 8111, with the flip side "Cecelia"). Frankie Valli & the Four Seasons later did a version of the song, inspired by Rose's, for their debut album Sherry & 11 Others in 1962.
- Ben Pollack's Pickarib Boys (recorded February 28, 1950, released by Discovery as catalog number 131)
- Louis Jordan (recorded March 1, 1951, released by Decca as catalog number 27620 with the flip side "You Will Always Have a Friend")
- Lester Young (recorded November 28, 1952, released by Norgran in 1954 on Lester Young with the Oscar Peterson Trio)
- Doris Day (1953 – not released as a single but recorded for a radio program; eventually released in the album Doris Day Sings 22 Original Recordings by Hindsight in 1987)
- Oscar Peterson (recorded May 21, 1953, released by Mercury as catalog number 89062, with the flip side "Spring Is Here", also released by Mercury subsidiary Clef under the same catalog number)
- Bing Crosby included the song in his album Some Fine Old Chestnuts (1954)
- Ella Fitzgerald (1957) recorded live on the Verve release Ella at Zardi's
- Dean Martin (recorded January 28, 1957, released by Capitol as catalog number 3718 [78 rpm] and F-3718 [45 rpm], with the flip side "I Never Had a Chance")
- Judy Garland included the song in her album Judy In Love (1958). Garland also recorded a different version of the song on her live album, Judy at Carnegie Hall (1961).
- Sonny Stitt (recorded May 18, 1959, released by Verve in 1959 on Sonny Stitt Sits in with the Oscar Peterson Trio)
- Marlene Dietrich (1965)
- Diana Krall (released in 1999) on her album When I Look In Your Eyes.
- June Christy – Cool Christy (2002)
- Regis Philbin – When You're Smiling (2004)
- Jerry Lee Lewis – The (Complete) Session Recorded in London with Great Guest Artists (recorded January 1973, released 2006; Mercury)
- Lorna Luft – Songs My Mother Taught Me (2007)
- The Hot Sardines on their eponymous album released in 2014
- Buddy Morrow (released by RCA Victor as catalog number 20–3947, with the flip side "Our Song of Love")
- Peggy Lee and Dave Barbour (released by Capitol as catalog numbers 511 and 10118, both with the flip side "Why Don't You Do Right?")

== Tony Bennett and Lady Gaga version ==
"I Can't Give You Anything but Love"

Single by Tony Bennett and Lady Gaga

from the album Cheek to Cheek
- Released: August 19, 2014
- Studio: Conway (Los Angeles)
- Genre: Jazz
- Length: 3:13
- Label: Streamline; Columbia; Interscope
- Songwriters: Dorothy Fields; Jimmy McHugh
- Producer: Dae Bennett

Tony Bennett singles chronology
"Anything Goes" (2014)	"I Can't Give You Anything but Love" (2014)	"I Get a Kick Out of You" (2021)

Lady Gaga singles chronology
"Anything Goes" (2014)	"I Can't Give You Anything but Love" (2014)	"Til It Happens to You" (2015)

Studio video
- "I Can't Give You Anything but Love" on YouTube

=== Composition and reception ===
The version of "I Can't Give You Anything but Love" on Cheek to Cheek has Tony Bennett and Lady Gaga alternating verses alongside piano, a brass section and drums. She also altered the lyrics to sing "Gee, I'd like to say you're looking swell, Tony", who later rejoins with the line "Diamond bracelets won't work, doesn't sell, Gaga". Jeff Benjamin from Fuse was positive in his review, saying that "[t]here's a walking bassline, gospel organs and brassy horn blasts to back the pair's soulful crooning. And while we love listening to Gaga and Tony, we really get into the throwback vibe when the trumpet solo kicks in. Trey Barrineau from USA Today complimented the duos vocals, saying that the song "really swings".

Jesse David Fox from New York also gave a positive review, stating that "lot has been written about the creative and commercial shortcomings of Gaga's last record, [Artpop], but I, for one, am glad about its failure – because anything that frees her up to record more music with Tony Bennett is a win in my book. 'I Can't Give You Anything but Love' is a great example; Tony Bennett might be 88, but it's Gaga who hasn't sounded this alive in years." A writer for Next Magazine declared that Gaga sounded "absolutely stellar" in the song, and found it to be a "vocal vehicle" for the artist to "show off" her singing. Debra Kamin from The Times of Israel praised Gaga's vocals on "I Can't Give You Anything but Love", for her range and control. MTV News critic Gil Kaufman described the track as "funky". Alexa Camp from Slant Magazine gave a negative review, saying that "for a singer who isn't even 30, Gaga's voice is shockingly rough-hewn".

=== Release and commercial performance ===
"I Can't Give You Anything but Love" was released as the second single from Bennett's and Lady Gaga's first collaborative album Cheek to Cheek (2014) on August 19, 2014. Gaga announced the release on Twitter, accompanied by the single's cover art. On October 6, two remixes of the song were made available for digital download. Remix by Italian record producer Giorgio Moroder was released exclusively to Idolator website. Another remix was an Earmilk exclusive and was made by Austrian musician Parov Stelar. He changed the cover into a "bouncy jazz house mix that provides a perfect compliment to the stars' seasoned vocals". Additionally, Universal Music Group sent the single to Italian radios on January 16, 2015. After its release, "I Can't Give You Anything but Love" debuted at number-one on the Jazz Digital Songs chart of Billboard, on the week ending September 6, 2014. The single also appeared on national charts of France and Italy at numbers 173 and 76 respectively.

=== Music video ===
An official music video for the song was released on August 26, 2014. The video was shot in the recording studio and the first half showed Gaga in numerous outfits and wigs, while recording the song and roaming around. Bennett joins the studio sessions later on, singing the song. The final chorus finds the two singers belting together, described as "join[ing] forces for a peculiar, yet potent blend of styles that transcends generations and genres".

Jon Blistein from Rolling Stone complimented the video, saying that it "proves [Gaga and Bennett] exude a unique, adorable brand of musical chemistry". Maurice Bobb from MTV News noticed the "bare essence" of the duo in the video and added that Gaga appeared "overwhelmingly subdued", but felt that "her playful energy still shines through as she preens and shimmies to [Bennett's] smooth crooning." Nolan Feeney from Time that Gaga appeared normal in the video and added that "she's still fun to watch even when she's just hanging out in the vocal both (and dressed like a relatively normal human, no less)." Katie Atkinson from Billboard declared that "If you love the adorable friendship between glam pop queen Lady Gaga and classic crooner Tony Bennett, you'll definitely want to see the breezy behind-the-scenes studio video of the pair for 'I Can't Give You Anything but Love'."

=== Charts ===
Weekly chart performance for "I Can't Give You Anything but Love, Baby"
Chart (2014)	Peak position
France (SNEP)	173
Italy (FIMI)	76
US Jazz Digital Songs (Billboard)	1

=== Release history ===
Release dates and formats for "I Can't Give You Anything but Love, Baby"
Region	Date	Format	Version	Label	Ref.
Various	August 19, 2014	Digital download	Original	Columbia; Interscope	
Various	October 6, 2014	Digital download	Giorgio Moroder remix	Columbia; Interscope	
Various	October 6, 2014	Digital download	Parov Stelar remix	Columbia; Interscope	
Italy	January 16, 2015	Radio airplay	Original	Universal	

== Use in the media ==
- In Disney animated sound cartoon The Birthday Party of January 1931, the song is performed as a duet between Mickey and Minnie Mouse.
- In the Warner Brothers sound cartoon Bosko's Holiday of June 1931, the song is used as instrumental background music.
- The song is featured in the screwball comedy Bringing Up Baby (1938) in several scenes, since apparently the song is the only thing that placates the surly leopard named Baby, which quirky heiress Susan Vance (Katharine Hepburn) and befuddled paleontologist Dr. David Huxley (Cary Grant) have to bring to her aunt.
- In Seven Sinners (1940), the song is performed by the character Bijou Blanche, portrayed by Marlene Dietrich.
- Lena Horne performed this song in the film Stormy Weather (1943).
- Judy Holliday sings this while playing cards in the film Born Yesterday (1950).
- In John Cassavetes' film The Killing of a Chinese Bookie (1976), the song is sung by the cabaret MC, Mr. Sophistication, played by Meade Roberts, and also by Ben Gazzara, when he asks from a pay phone which act is on.
- The song is featured in the short animation Contract (1985).
- A version of the song appears on Vincent LaGuardia Gambini Sings Just for You. It is performed by Joe Pesci and Marisa Tomei, portraying their characters from the film My Cousin Vinny.
- The song is used in the film version of The Green Mile (1999).
- The song is featured in the 2006 Tony Award-winning Broadway play Jersey Boys (along with the 2014 film adaptation of the same name).
- The song is played during the episode "He's Our You" of Lost.
- The song is played during The Aviator (2004).
- A version of the song sung by Doris Day is played during the opening credits of Married Life (2007).

• The song was featured prominently in the Peter Orullian novel, Scenes From A Memory, based on the Dream Theater album of the same name.
