= Black Bottom (dance) =

Dance

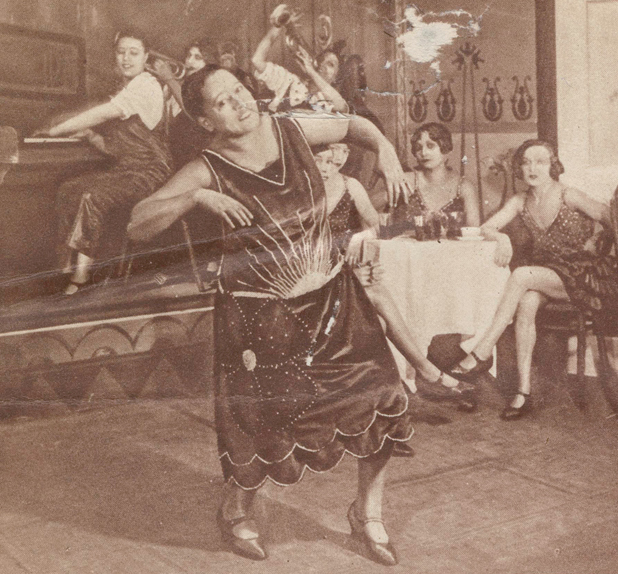
- Edith Wilson dancing the Black Bottom in the London production of Lew Leslie's Blackbirds of 1926
- Year: 1920s

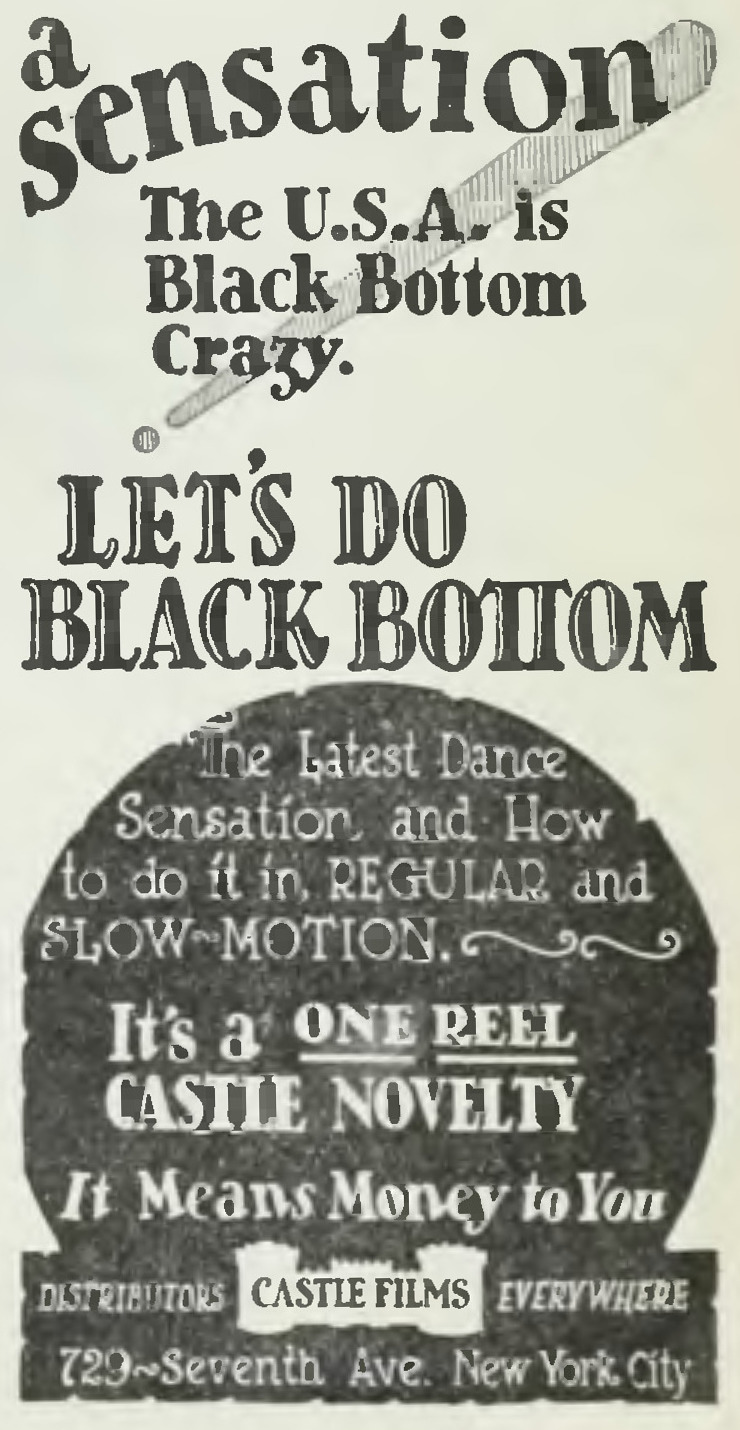
"The U.S.A. is Black Bottom Crazy" "Let's Do Black Bottom" ad in The Film Daily, 1926

The Black Bottom is a dance which became popular during the 1920s amid the Jazz Age. It was danced solo or by couples. Originating among African Americans in the rural South, the black bottom eventually spread to mainstream American culture and became a national craze in the 1920s. The dance was most famously performed by Ann Pennington, a star of the Ziegfeld Follies, who performed it in a Broadway revue staged by Ziegfeld's rival George White in 1926.

== Origins ==
Sheet music for the "new dance sensation", the Black Bottom

The dance originated in New Orleans in the first decade of the 20th century. Jazz pianist and composer Jelly Roll Morton wrote the tune "Black Bottom Stomp".

The black bottom was well known among semirural blacks across the South. A similar dance with many variations was commonly performed in tent shows, and "Bradford and Jeanette" had used it as a finale.

Songwriters Gus Horsley and Perry Bradford published their composition "Original Black Bottom Dance" in 1926, first registering the U.S. copyright for the composition on Aug. 5, 1926. The sheet music publication was prefaced with a "note to the dancing public" claiming that "This dance started in Atlanta Georgia, 1923 in a Negro settlement called 'Darktown'..." The sheet music's cover photograph features dancer Stella Doyle, who performed primarily in cabarets.

The "Original Black Bottom Dance" sheet music stated on the cover that the music and dance were introduced by the African-American dancer and choreographer Billy Pierce in the Broadway Gaities musical revue. Pierce was an associate of the African-American choreographer Buddy Bradley, and Bradley, working out of Pierce's dance studio in New York City, devised dance routines for Tom Pericola and other Broadway performers. The dance was featured in the 1924 Harlem revue Dinah.

In 1926, the Broadway musical comedy revue George White's Scandals of 1926 featured the dance accompanied by an entirely new song, also titled "Black Bottom", written by the songwriting team of Ray Henderson, Buddy DeSylva and Lew Brown and published by Harms Inc. of New York. The Henderson, Brown & DeSylva song itself was successful outside of Broadway, and had at least 9 commercial recordings during the year after the song was published. A re-creation of that version by choreographer Rod Alexander was featured in the 1956 biopic, The Best Things in Life Are Free, performed by Sheree North and Jacques d'Amboise, leading a stage full of flappers and tuxedoed Johnnies.

The featured dancers performing the black bottom in the George White's Scandals were Ann Pennington and Tom Patricola. Following the success of both the George White show and the recorded versions of its hit song, the dance became a national craze. The black bottom dance overtook the Charleston in popularity and eventually became the number one social dance. Some dance critics noted that by the time it became a fad in American society in the mid-20s, it resembled the Charleston. Both dances can be performed solo or as a couple and feature exuberant moves.

== Dance steps ==
The rhythm of the black bottom is based on the Charleston. Bradford's version, printed with the sheet music, gave these instructions:

Hop down front then doodle back [doodle means "slide"]

Mooch to your left then mooch to the right
Hands on your hips and do the mess around,
Break a leg until you're near the ground [break a leg is a hobbling step]

Now that's the old black bottom dance

Instructions for the mooch are "Shuffle forward with both feet. Hips go first, then feet."

Broadway historians Kantor and Maslon describe it as a 'fairly simple step punctuated by a slap on the rear end' with the hobbling step akin to pulling your feet out of the deep muddy waters of the Swanee. The Alexander recreation expanded this into having his dance partners cheekily bump their posteriors together; although there is no evidence to suggest that was part of the original dance.

== Legacy ==
"Ma Rainey's Black Bottom", a 1920s blues song by Ma Rainey, makes obvious allusions to the dance but is not itself dance music. Ma Rainey's Black Bottom is also the title of a 1982 play by August Wilson, set around recording of the song. Wilson's play was adapted into a 2020 movie of the same name starring Viola Davis as Ma Rainey.

The comedy musician Spike Jones, who became popular in the 1940s, recorded the Henderson, Brown and De Sylva song "Black Bottom." His version, released on 78-RPM records, repeated a single measure of a piano solo in the middle of the song several times, each time continuing with a loud "crack!" as a joke to make the record sound broken.

The dance was featured in the 1927 Austrian silent film, Café Elektric.

Judy Garland repeats vocal refrains from the song while dancing in some chorus girl lines in a montage sequence from A Star Is Born (1954).

The Troggs released a single and album about the dance in the early 1980s.
