= Ruth Virginia Bayton =

American-born entertainer and actress (1903–1948)

Ruth Bayton
- Born: Ruth Virginia Bayton; 5 February 1903; Tappahannock, Virginia, U.S.
- Died: September 27, 1948 (aged 45); Los Angeles, California, U.S.
- Occupations: Dancer, Singer, Actress
- Years active: 1922–48

Ruth Virginia Bayton (February 5, 1903 - September 27, 1948) was an American-born entertainer and actress known in France, Germany, Spain, and Argentina.

== Early life ==
Bayton was born on February 5, 1903, in Tappahannock, Virginia. She was the sixth child of Virginia and Hansford C. Bayton, a river boat captain who operated an excursion steamer along the Virginian coast. After 1910, Bayton was sent to Philadelphia to live with her uncle, George Bayton, a physician.

== Career ==
=== Early career (1922–1925) ===
In the summer of 1922, after finishing school and finding work as a stenographer, Bayton was introduced to Will Vodrey, director of the Plantation Orchestra, who helped her into the chorus of the Florence Mills Plantation Revue. The following summer, director Lew Leslie took the revue to London as From Dixie to Dover Street. The show returned to the US to play on Broadway in 1924 as Dixie to Broadway. In 1925, she appeared in Tan Town Topics, with Ethel Waters as the leading star and Josephine Baker in the chorus.

=== Arrival in Europe (1926) ===
In 1926, the show arrived at Paris's Les Ambassadeurs as Blackbirds of 1926. The show opened on May 28. Some French celebrities attended, including Maurice Chevalier, Sacha Guitry, Yvonne Vallée, the Dolly Sisters, and Josephine Baker. In July, the show moved to the Théâtre des Champs-Élysées, where Josephine Baker had made her debut months earlier. One night Bayton was approached by Henri Lartigue, who worked for the William Morris Booking Agency and arranged for the show to come to France. He offered her a contract in Berlin with a weekly salary of $200. Bayton signed the contract, agreeing to work at the theater from the following month. Later, she appeared at the Admiralspalast all-black revue An Und Aus in between rehearsals for a much larger show at the Theatre des Westens. On August 4, Der Zug Nach dem Westen opened, and Bayton appeared in a girdle of a dozen bananas. Her dancing was a hit with the German press with her extravagant jungle interpretation accompanied by a cast of 200. The revue was taken to the Apollotheater in Vienna for the winter, before being rearranged into a new version with skimpier costumes and more American performers such as Ben Tyber and Louis Douglas under the title Wissen Sie Schon. The revamped show opened in March 1927 and ran for another three months. During her time in Germany, Bayton is reported to have earned over $200,000.

She appeared in the tableau Der Gott und Die Bajadere, dancing nude except for a silver loincloth in front of a large statue of Buddha, this time with a salary of $600. There are many stories from Berlin of a handsome Spanish Marquis who would appear with Bayton late at night in the streets of the Friedrichstrasse and under the shadows of the Unter den Linden. Later it was claimed that this was King Alfonso XIII of Spain. Much of this gossip was generated by her onstage image as the personification of unbridled sexuality. Similar gossip surrounded her counterpart Josephine Baker. That summer, Bayton appeared in Hamburg at the Argentinean-themed Trocadero Kabarett. She was showered with flowers, and the German press billed her as the 'Most Beautiful Creole' on the Continent.

=== Spain (1927) ===
After an appearance in the French resort town Biarritz to perform for a charity event at the Chateau-Basque, Bayton accompanied the Spanish actor Valeriano Ruiz Paris into Barcelona to open his revue Not-Yet at the Teatro Cómico. There she introduced her new dance, the Chotiston (a mixture of the Charleston and the Chotis). In Barcelona, she met an old friend and German film director, Robert Wiene, who wanted Bayton to star in his latest film, based on the love affair between a European sovereign and a beautiful dancer. Filming wrapped up by the end of September, and the German crew returned to Berlin. Bayton moved on to Valencia in October to appear in the El Folies-Bergere cabaret, where a painting of herself (and Josephine Baker) hung above the stage. The following month, she travelled to Madrid to star in Noche Loca at the Teatro Maravillas with a white American orchestra, a salary of $800, and musical scores composed by the famous Francisco Alonso. After hours, she performed at the exclusive Maipu-Pigall's nightclub, which King Alfonso and the Primo de Rivera were known to frequent. That winter, before she could accept Louis Douglas's offer to appear in his Black Follies revue at the Teatro Comedia, Paul Derval, director of the Folies Bergère, invited her to return to Paris for the new season, as Josephine was leaving for a world tour.

=== France (1928–1930) ===
Rehearsals for La Grande Folie began in February between appearances at the Casanova nightclub. Meanwhile, Bayton was approached by the director of the Folies-Wagram, a new music hall to be inaugurated the following month with Revue Wagram, but Bayton declined. In early March, after two weeks at the Folies-Bergere, she moved on to the Folies-Wagram. Avoiding Paul Derval for the next three months, she appeared with Marie Dubas dancing in the finale of the first act with sensual grace. When her German film was released on April 12, the rumors of her affair with the Spanish monarch began to resurface. The Spanish government offered the German producers $187,000 to destroy the film or at least prevent it from appearing in France and Spain. Bayton was making conquests in high society, and on her string were some of Germany's wealthiest bankers.

Bayton lived at the Hotel Ambassador with a chauffeur-driven Hispano-Suiza and two maids, something she would have never accomplished in America. "Absolutely impossible," she later remarked to a visiting journalist, "I would have never been given the opportunity. I love Paris, the German people have been very kind, and so have the folks in Spain." After working at Floresco Bonbonniere, she spent the summer in Deauville, dancing at the seaside casinos and appearing at the racetracks with a new admirer, Armand Rochefoucauld, Marquis de Deauville. At the Concert Mayol cabaret in late November, Bayton was again dancing beside Marie Dubas in Cochon Qui Sommeille (The Slumbering Pig). She then returned for a brief appearance in Berlin's Barberina Kabarett, where she complained that the audience would try to grab her as she danced. However, the emerging right-wing movement was bent on purging the decadence of Weimar Germany. This was the infant Nazi movement; to them, Bayton represented both the decadence and racial impurity in Germany.

In January, Ada 'Bricktop' Smith, left behind her old establishment of the Grand Duc and opened Chez Bricktop's on the Place Pigalle. Besides Edith Wilson and Zaidee Jackson, Bayton returned from the German capital to appear at the new venue. During this time, she purchased an apartment at 77 Champs-Élysées, once briefly occupied by Josephine Baker. Soon she ran into Leon Abbey and his orchestra and joined him on his Spanish tour to play in Seville, which was hosting the Exposición Ibero-Americana. There was plenty of money to be made as American tourists filled the nightclubs and theatres of the Andalucian city. Barcelona's Exposició Internacional was also nearby, where they appeared on the Expo grounds. However, she also returned to Madrid and danced through the winter at the Maipu-Pigall's cabaret, known to be frequented by the Spanish monarch.

On March 8, she rejoined Abbey's band in London to appear at the Deauville Restaurant. After two weeks, Leon was deported to Paris for not having obtained his work permits. That summer, after an invitation while appearing in London, Bayton returned to Paris for the Theatre Apollo, where she appeared with the dramatic singer Damia and the American dancer Jack Forester in the new 'oriental-themed' revue Revue Milliardaire. Once again, Bayton was chosen for the finale of the first act as Scheherazade in the "Slave Merchant" sketch. After the revue closed in August, she joined Sam Wooding's band in La Jungle Enchanté at the Theatre Olympia before moving to the Theatre Marigny on September 7. In December 1930, as France prepared itself for the upcoming Exposition Coloniale, Bayton returned to New York to try her luck back in America showcasing her talents that were well received in Europe.

=== Return to United States (1931–1933) ===
Back in the United States, Bayton bought an apartment in the Sugar Hill district near Harlem, but was immediately invited to return to France to accompany Noble Sissle's orchestra at the Restaurant des Ambassadeurs. However, the French authorities were determined to reduce the number of foreign workers in France, including overseas musicians. Bayton became aware of a rumor that suggested that Sissle's band would only be permitted to fulfill the second half of its booking if 50 percent of its personnel were replaced with French artists. This proved to be true, and she declined the offer. She remained in New York and opened a small boutique selling perfumes and fur wraps. Bayton's time away from the stage brought her back into the nightlife; she appeared in some of Harlem's popular establishments like Savoy Ballroom and the Smalls Paradise in Ethel Baird's Revue. The fortune she had accumulated abroad quickly dwindled, as she was unable to maintain the same standards as she had in Europe. In early 1932, Bayton was offered a role in a floorshow at a ritzy Broadway cabaret and struck it rich again when she foiled a holdup and was rewarded handsomely. By November, she was appearing in Newark, New Jersey, where she rented rooms from the mother of an old friend, Crackshot Hackley. She subsequently got into an argument with one of the tenants, John Burtt, the white director of the Lafayette Theatre; the altercation ended in Bayton's beating him with a dog chain from one of her numerous pets. The fight later involved Crackshot and his mother. After this scandal, Bayton informed her family she was returning to Europe.

=== France and South America (1933–1943) ===
In February 1933, the French press announced her return to France on the Lafayette. They were most enthusiastic about the return of their "belle creole," but the depression arrived in Europe that winter, causing the economy to fall apart and bringing public demonstrations across France. Despite declining business in Montmartre, Bayton was found performing at the Rio-Rita Cabaret. Her appearances became sparse, and she departed for Deauville, entertaining at the Bar du Soleil and Casino Municipal. There she found some old acquaintances. One of these was 79-year old Cora E. Rollins of Chicago, who spent the weekend visiting her son-in-law, Elliot Carpenter, the orchestra director of the Casino, Mrs. Rollins: "Miss Bayton tried to persuade me to try my luck at the tables, but as I'm admittedly a bad loser, declined." Another was Josephine Baker, who was also appearing at the Bar Soleil and became enamored with Bayton's German banker lover. Josephine tried to become close with her old friend to receive an introduction. However, Bayton was no longer interested in reconnecting with her old cohort; she discovered Josephine's motives and snubbed her old friend. Soon afterward, Bayton departed for Argentina and took up residence in Buenos Aires, where she continued working as a singer with Carpenter as her pianist.

In January 1935, Bayton and Carpenter joined the Compañía Argentina de Revistas y Espectáculos Musicales and appeared in the revue, "A Menina Brasileña, Prefiero La Girl Porteña" at the Teatro Porteño. The following month, the revue appeared for a few weeks in Montevideo at the Teatro 18 de Julio.

Eight months later, Carpenter returned home to the United States and Bayton continued appearing in popular Argentinian establishments. On December 20, 1935, she appeared in a French-style revue, "C'est Pour Vous" at the Teatro Casino alongside English artist, Pearl Ondra. The following year, Bayton toured throughout Argentina, appearing in particular at the Boîte La Marina alongside the Spanish ballerina, Reina Mora in Rosario in May 1936.

Back in the United States, Bayton's family was worried about her whereabouts. They had not heard from her since her return in 1933 when she stopped writing home. They were unable to contact her in May 1937 when her Uncle George died. Her believed she returned to Spain, where the Spanish Civil War raged. Soon, however, they learned that she was residing in Argentina, achieving huge success both theatrically and romantically.

During the summer of 1938, Bayton stood trial at the Palacio de Justicia: "By order of Mr. Investigating Judge for Criminal Matters in the capital of Argentina, Dr. Antonio L. Beiuti, is quoted calls and summons Ruth "Virginia" Bayton, so that within thirty days, computed from the first publication of this, appear to be right in the cause for false testimony that followed, failing to declare rebellious if not done."

By 1943, Bayton was appearing at José María Gamboa's Boîte Manhattan, located at Calle Arroyo 854. On January 6, 1943, the Diario Critica reported an incident where the singer, Horacio Mork and two other accomplices stole alcohol and some of Bayton's possessions from the cabaret.

Shortly after the June 1943 Argentine Revolution, Bayton returned to the United States aboard the SS Rio Lujan.

=== Later life (1944–1948) ===
There's little information on her later life.

In March 1946, Bayton appeared briefly in London before returning to New York aboard the MS John Ericsson. She maintained a residence in New York for a few months before relocating to Los Angeles, where she married Lawrence Henry and established a home in Long Beach on East 19th Street. Around April 1948, Bayton was diagnosed with cancer and on July 16, admitted to the Los Angeles County Hospital where she died on September 27, 1948. She was buried at the Calvary Cemetery on October 2.
