= Chappelle and Stinnette Records =

US independent record label

Chappelle and Stinnette Records, sometimes known as C&S Records was a small independent United States record label founded in New York City around 1921.

According to the label, Chappelle and Stinnette Records were manufactured "by C.& S. Phonograph Record Co.", which in turn was run by the husband and wife team of Thomas E. Chappelle and Juanita Stinnette Chappelle, noted African American entertainers of the time. Chappelle and Stinnette is notable as the third record company to be owned and operated by African Americans. (After Broome Records and Black Swan Records.) All but one of the 9 known C&S records feature one or both of the Chappelles singing. Clarence Williams also recorded one disc for the label.

The audio fidelity of C&S records is about average for the era. It is unknown whether C&S recorded their own sides or if they leased recording studio use from some other company, probably in New York City. The Chappelle and Stinnette disc records are quite rare. All of the releases on this label were blues, and all were likely recorded in 1921 or early 1922.

== See also ==
- List of record labels
