= Juanita Stinnette Chappelle =

Singer and vaudeville performer

Juanita Stinnette Chappelle (June 3, 1899 – June 4, 1932) was a singer and vaudeville performer, as well as co-founder of Chappelle and Stinnette Records during the Harlem Renaissance era. Their record label was founded around 1921 and is considered one of the earliest labels owned and operated by African Americans. They produced 6 records, five of which they performed on.

She was born in Baltimore, Maryland and attended Carey Street School. She was a member of the chorus of Whitney and Tutt's Smart Set Company in 1917. Thomas Chapelle saw her and recognized her potential as a dancing partner. They rehearsed for several days and were immediately a success when they began performing. They eventually married.

In 1927, she sang at the funeral of friend Florence Mills. Chapelle was singing her own composition when she collapsed and had to be carried from the church.

Her last Broadway show was Sugar Hill.
