= Mattie Hite =

American blues singer

Mattie Hite (sometimes spelled Matie Hite; c. 1890 – c. 1935) was an American blues singer in the classic female blues style.

== Life and career ==
Little is known about her family background except that she may have been a niece of the bandleader and saxophonist Les Hite. Her birthplace is unknown, but New York City has been suggested. Around 1915 she moved to Chicago, where she sang at the Panama Club, often with such performers as Alberta Hunter, Cora Green, and Florence Mills. In 1919 she returned to New York City, where she worked in cabarets, singing at many nightspots, including Barron Wilkin's Astoria Cafe and Pod's and Jerry's. Hite recorded in 1921 for Victor Records, but the result was unissued. She recorded again in 1923 with Fletcher Henderson for the Pathé label, in 1923 and 1924 for the Bell label, and in 1930 with Cliff Jackson for the Columbia label. From 1928 to 1932 she appeared in various revues at the Lafayette Theater in New York City. She is thought to have died in New York City in about 1935.

The blues writer Derrick Stewart-Baxter wrote in 1970 that "according to Frankie "Half Pint" Jaxon, [Hite] was a long, tall woman, who flavored her act with some extremely risqué songs". James P. Johnson considered Hite "one of the greatest cabaret singers of all time". She was known especially for her version of "St. James' Infirmary".

Hite's complete recordings were reissued in CD format by Document Records on Female Blues Singers, Volume 9: H2 (1923–1930) Complete Recorded Works & Supplements (DOCD-5513).

== Nellie Hite ==
The singer Nellie Hite, who recorded two sides in 1923 for Bell label, may be Mattie Hite or her sister.
