= Gertrude Curtis =

American dentist (1880–1973)

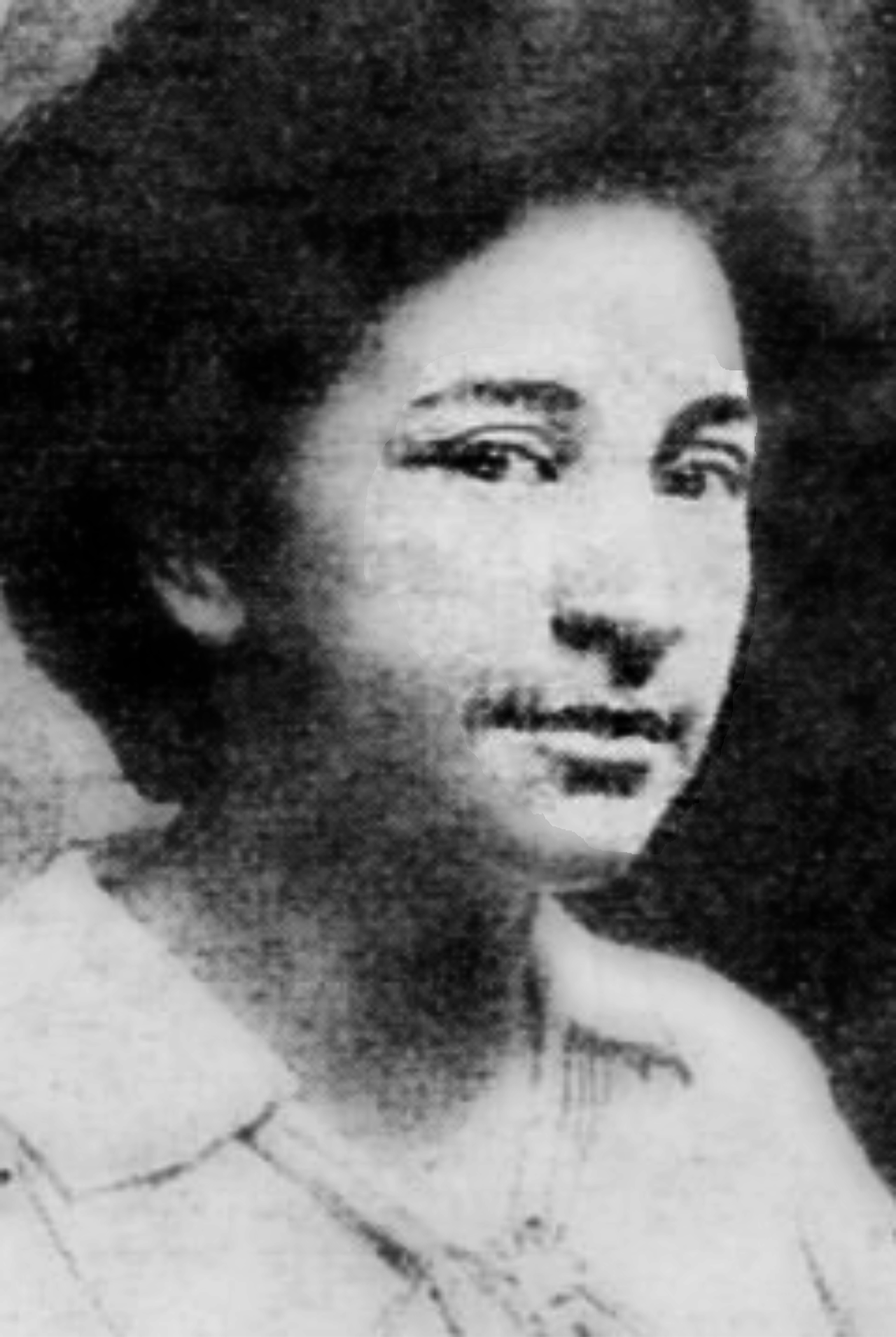
- Curtis in a 1910 newspaper
- Born: March 1, 1880
- Died: August 3, 1973 (aged 93)
- Other name: Gertrude Curtis McPherson (using 1st husband's legal surname)
- Occupation: Dentist
- Spouse(s): Cecil Mack; Ulysses "Slow Kid" Thompson

Gertrude Elizabeth Curtis (March 1, 1880 – August 3, 1973), also known as Gertrude Curtis McPherson, was an American dentist. She had a longtime practice in Harlem.

== Early life and education ==
Curtis was from Bradford, Pennsylvania, and was the daughter of Stephen Curtis and Agnes Elizabeth Curtis. Her father was a barber. She graduated from the New York College of Dental and Oral Surgery in 1909, becoming the first black woman to gain a dentistry license in New York State.

== Career ==
Soon after completing her dental education, Curtis ran a weekly dental clinic at Bellevue Hospital. She had a dental practice in Harlem for many years.

Curtis was active in politics and civic organizations. She served as a delegate to the 1918 Republican State Convention in Saratoga, and represented the Roosevelt Colored Women's Republican Club at the 1920 Republican National Convention in Chicago. She was president of the Business and Professional Women's Club in Harlem in 1932. She was a member of the NAACP, spoke at the YWCA and Mother Zion Church on health topics, and helped to raise money for the Sojourner Truth Home for Wayward Girls. She was active with the Harlem Experimental Theatre.

Curtis was also involved in her musician husband's work. She helped with publicity for a special midnight performance of Shuffle Along in 1921, a benefit for the NAACP. She accompanied a show on its European tour in 1923, and directed a choir during another show's tour in Europe in 1929 and 1930.

== Personal life ==
Curtis married "Charleston" composer Cecil Mack (Richard Cecil McPherson) in 1912; she was widowed when Mack died in 1944. In 1946, she became the fourth wife of dancer Ulysses "Slow Kid" Thompson, who was the widower of Florence Mills. She died in 1973, aged 93 years.
