= Blackbirds of 1928 =

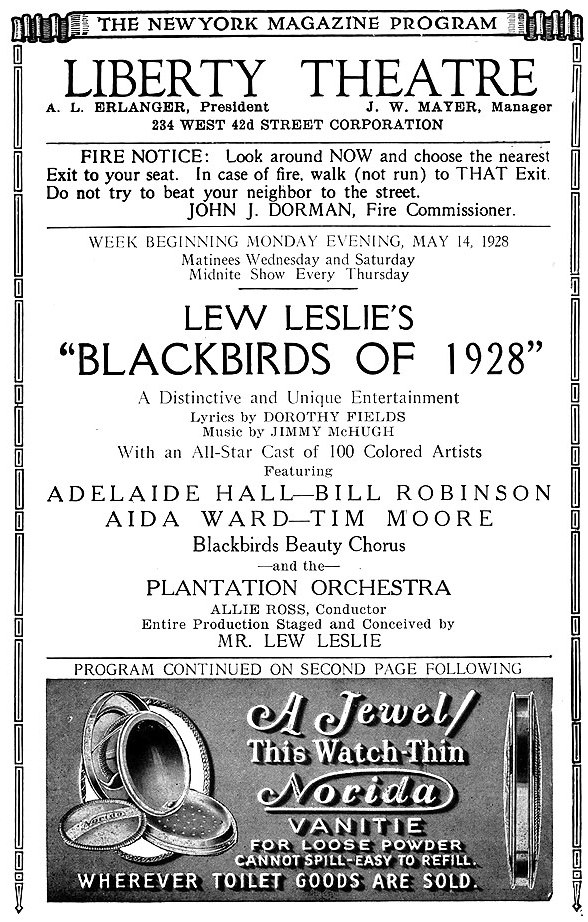
- Title page of Broadway program
- Music: Jimmy McHugh
- Lyrics: Dorothy Fields
- Basis: musical revue
- Productions: 1928 Broadway

Blackbirds of 1928 was a hit Broadway musical revue that starred Adelaide Hall, Bill Bojangles Robinson, Tim Moore and Aida Ward, with music by Jimmy McHugh and lyrics by Dorothy Fields. It contained the hit songs "Diga Diga Do", the duo's first hit, "I Can't Give You Anything But Love", "Bandanna Babies" and "I Must Have That Man" all sung by Hall.

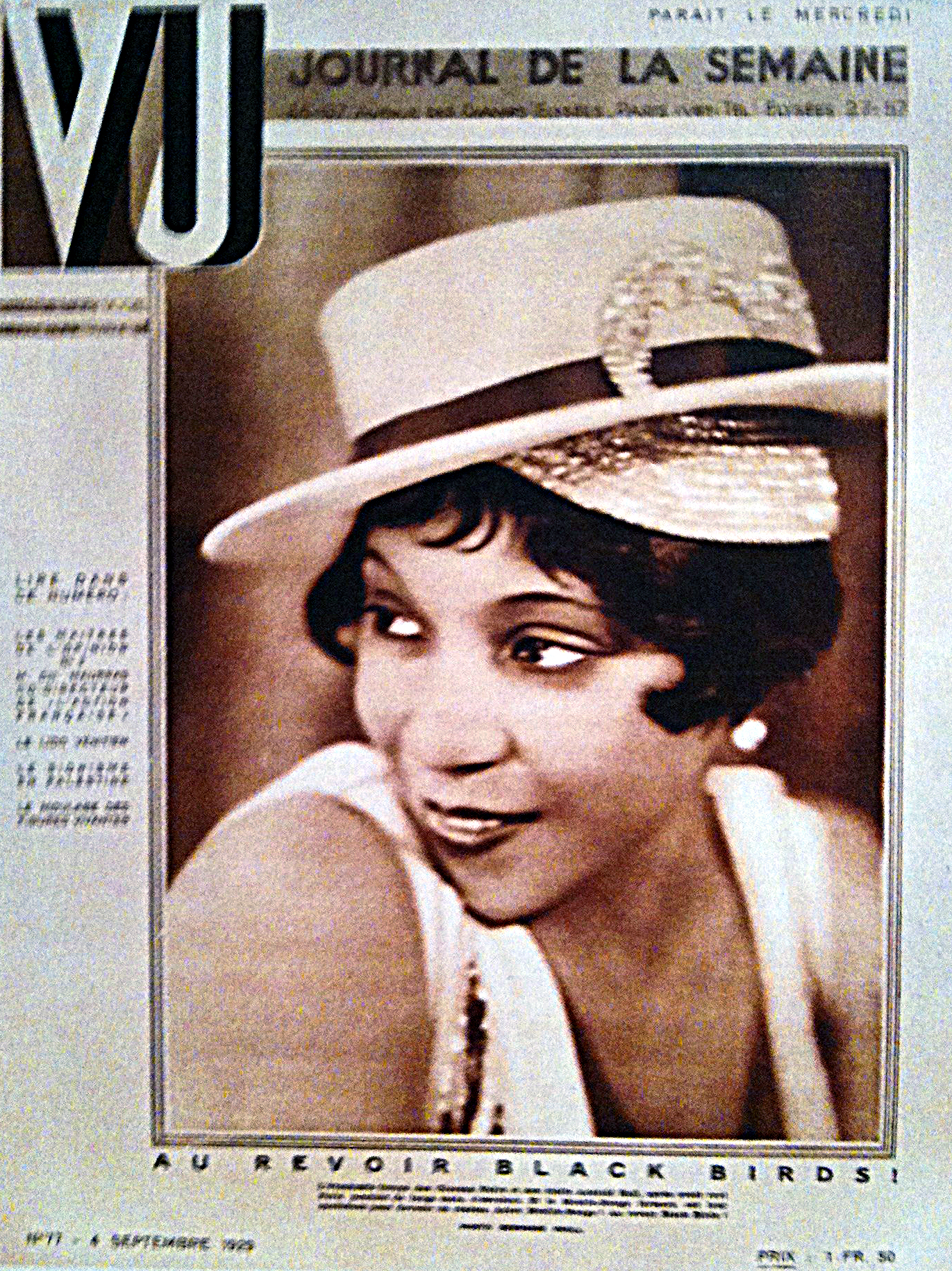
Hall on the front cover of the French edition of Vu (magazine),1929

== History ==
Blackbirds of 1928 was the idea of impresario Lew Leslie, who planned to build the show around Florence Mills in New York City after her success in the hit show Blackbirds of 1926 in Paris and London. Mills died from tuberculosis in 1927 before rehearsals for the new show had started and Hall was enlisted to replace her.

Blackbirds of 1928 started its life as a floorshow at Les Ambassadeurs Club on 57th Street, New York with songs written by Jimmy McHugh and Dorothy Fields.

Fields recalled, "Lew Leslie (the producer) hired us to do a show called Blackbirds of 1928. First, we'd written songs for a show of his in a club called Les Ambassadeurs, where we had Roger Wolfe Kahn (Otto Kahn’s son) and his orchestra, and a lovely lady named Adelaide Hall, who sang".

McHugh recalled, "I knew about Roger Wolfe Kahn wanting to close the club, and I told Lew Leslie, and Lew went up and made arrangements to take it over. This was the start of the show called Blackbirds of 1928. Leslie opened Les Ambassadeurs with the first half of the show". The show was a great hit. McHugh continued, "From there we wrote a second half and we took the show to Atlantic City".

After the tryout in Atlantic City the show opened on Broadway. It was the first Broadway show for which Fields and McHugh had written the entire score and turned out to be a milestone in their respective careers and was one of the most successful shows they were ever connected with.

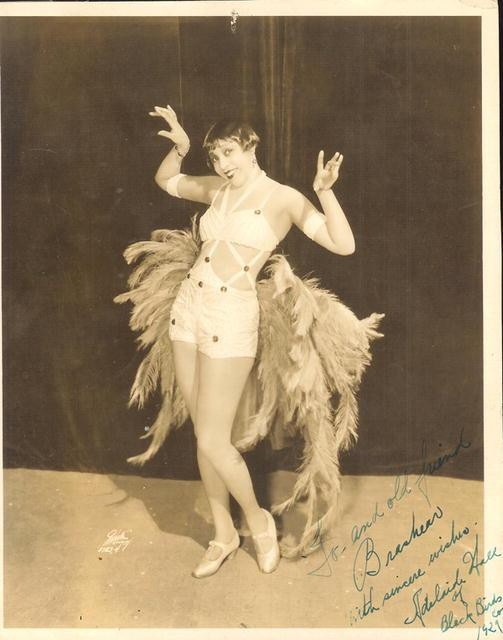
Adelaide Hall in Blackbirds of 1928

== Productions ==
The show originally opened on January 4, 1928, under the heading The Blackbird Revue at Les Ambassadeurs Nightclub in New York, before transferring in May 1928 to the Liberty Theatre on Broadway, where Lew Leslie changed the shows name to Blackbirds of 1928. The original Broadway production opened at the Liberty Theatre on May 9, 1928, where it ran for 518 performances, becoming the longest running all-black show on Broadway. It was directed by producer Lew Leslie and starred Adelaide Hall, Bill Bojangles Robinson. Aida Ward, Tim Moore, Blue McAllister, the Blackbirds Beauty Chorus and the Famous Blackbirds Orchestra conducted by Felix Weir. Also in the cast were Johnny Hudgins, Eloise C. Uggams, Elisabeth Welch, Mantan Moreland, Cecil Mack, Evelyn Anderson, and Nina Mae McKinney. Orchestral arrangements were by Will Vodery.

On 7 June 1929, the original Broadway production opened at the Moulin Rouge, Paris, France, where it became the hit of the season. In Paris it ran for three months before returning to the US for an American road tour.

== Musical numbers and sketches (in order of performance) ==
=== Prologue: Way Down South ===
- The Call of the South
- Shuffle Your Feet
- Dixie

=== Revue Part One ===
- Aunt Jemima Stroll
- Scene in Jungleland
- Diga Diga Do
- Bear Cat Jones Last Fight
- I Can't Give You Anything But Love
- Song
- Trio
- What a Night
- Bandanna Babies
- Playing According to Hoyle
- Three Bad Men From Harlem
- Porgy (with apologies to the Guild Theatre and Dorothy and Dubose Heyward)
- Finale (part one)

=== Revue Part Two ===
- Magnolia's Wedding Day
- Earl Tucker Giving His Conception of the Low-Down Dance
- Picking a Plot
- Doin' the New Low-Down
- Getting Married in Harlem
- I Must Have That Man
- Here Comes My Blackbird
- Song
- A Memory of 1927
- Finale (part two)

== Recordings ==
- Adelaide Hall, accompanied by George Rickson (piano), "Baby" & "I Must Have That Man". Victor Rec, June 21, 1928 (test)
- E-28059 Adelaide Hall with Lew Leslie's Blackbird Orchestra. "I Must Have That Man" & "Baby". Brunswick 4031. August 14, 1928
- B12773-A. Adelaide Hall with Duke Ellington & His Famous Orchestra-"I Must Have That Man" & b/w "Baby". Blu Disc T1001. December 21, 1932
- Warren Mills and His Blue Serenaders recorded Gems from Blackbirds of 1928, being three titles, "I Can't Give You Anything But Love", "Doin' the New Lowdown" and "I Must Have That Man". This orchestra of 25 musicians included Arthur Whetsel, Bubber Miley and Freddie Jenkins on trumpet, Joe Nanton on trombone, Barney Bigard, Johnny Hodges and Harry Carney on reeds, Duke Ellington on piano, Fred Guy on banjo, Wellman Braud, bass, Sonny Greer, drums, an unknown female vocalist plus the 10-voice Hal Johnson choir, and Matty Malneck, violinist and conductor. See Luciano Massagli and Giovanni M. Volonté, The New Desor, An updated edition of Duke Ellington's Story on Records 1924-1974, Milano, 1999 session DE2819 and Dr. Klaus Stratemann, Duke Ellington, Day by Day and Film by Film, Jazzmedia ApS, Denmark, p. 1. December 20, 1928,

== 1933 recordings ==
In February 1933, Jack Kapp of Brunswick Records assembled an all-star group of Brunswick artists to record the entire score. Issued on six 10" 78s (6516 through 6521), available in an album set (the first such set of popular music from a Broadway show) and also sold individually:

- 6516 Duke Ellington & His Famous Orchestra - "Blackbirds Medley, parts 1 and 2"
- 6517 Ethel Waters with Duke Ellington & His Famous Orchestra - "I Can't Give You Anything But Love" b/w Mills Brothers with Cab Calloway and Duke Ellington & His Famous Orchestra - "Doin' The New Lowdown"
- 6518 Adelaide Hall with Duke Ellington and his Famous Orchestra - "I Must have That Man" & b/w "Baby". Brunswick. January 7, 1933
- 6519 Mills Brothers - "I Can't Give You Anything But Love" b/w Mills Brothers with Duke Ellington & His Famous Orchestra - "Diga Diga Doo"
- 6520 Bill Robinson with Don Redman & His Orchestra - "Doin' The New Lowdown" b/w Don Redman & His Orchestra with Harry and Donald Mills - "Shuffle Your Feet (And Just Roll Along)" and "Bandana Babies"
- 6521 Ethel Waters with Duke Ellington & His Famous Orchestra - "Porgy" b/w Cecil Mack Choir with Ethel Waters - "St. Louis Blues"

== Bibliography ==
- Williams, Iain Cameron (2002). Underneath A Harlem Moon ISBN 0-8264-5893-9
- Williams, Iain Cameron. The KAHNS of Fifth Avenue, iwp Publishing, February 17, 2022, ISBN 978-1916146587 - chapters 10 & 11 cover the staging of Blackbirds of 1928.
