= Birleanna Blanks =

American singer

Birleanna Blanks (born February 18, 1889 — August 12, 1968) was an entertainer and singer who had a successful stage and musical career during the early part of the Harlem Renaissance. She is known for her recording of “Mason Dixon Blues” and “Potomac River Blues” with the Fletcher Henderson Orchestra produced by Paramount Records.
