= Blackbirds of 1926 =

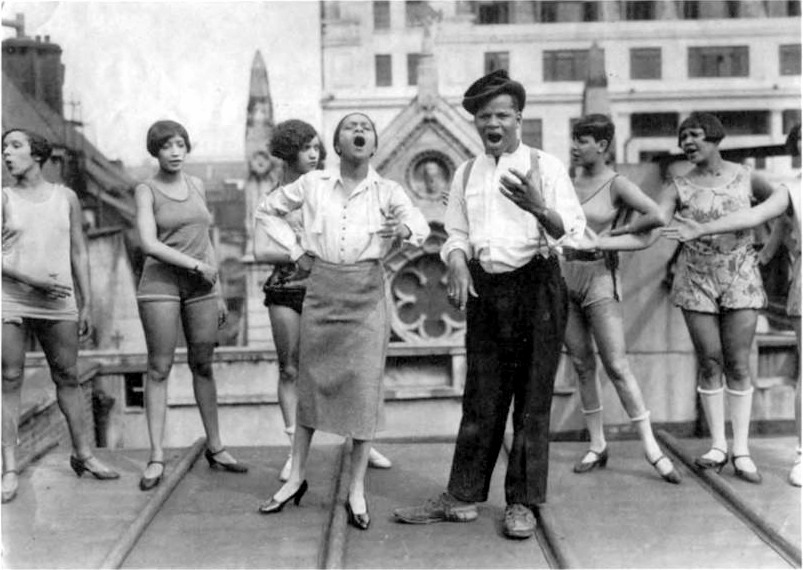
- Blackbirds of 1926 – Florence Mills, Johnny Hudgins and chorus girls rehearse on roof of the London Pavilion in September 1926
- Music: George W. Meyer, Arthur Johnston
- Lyrics: George W. Meyer, Grant Clarke, Roy Turk
- Productions: 1926 The Harlem Alhambra; 1926 Les Ambassadeurs (Paris); 1926 Kursaal Ostend (Belgium); 1926 London Pavilion; 1927 London Pavilion

Blackbirds of 1926, also known as Lew Leslie's Blackbirds of 1926, was a musical revue with an all African American cast created and produced by impresario Lew Leslie that starred Florence Mills, Edith Wilson, and Johnny Hudgins, with music by George W. Meyer and Arthur Johnston, and lyrics by Grant Clarke and Roy Turk. The Blackbirds were a continuation of Leslie's Plantation Revue, and the 1926 show was the first and original of a series of revues that would continue for more than a decade. The show ran for two years, and was succeeded by a new show called Blackbirds of 1928, a Broadway hit. Leslie mounted a series of Blackbirds revues, which ran in 1926, 1928, 1930, 1933 and 1939. The series were named after Mills' theme song, "I'm a Little Blackbird Looking for a Bluebird," a thinly veiled protest against racial injustice, which she first sang in 1924.

== Origin ==
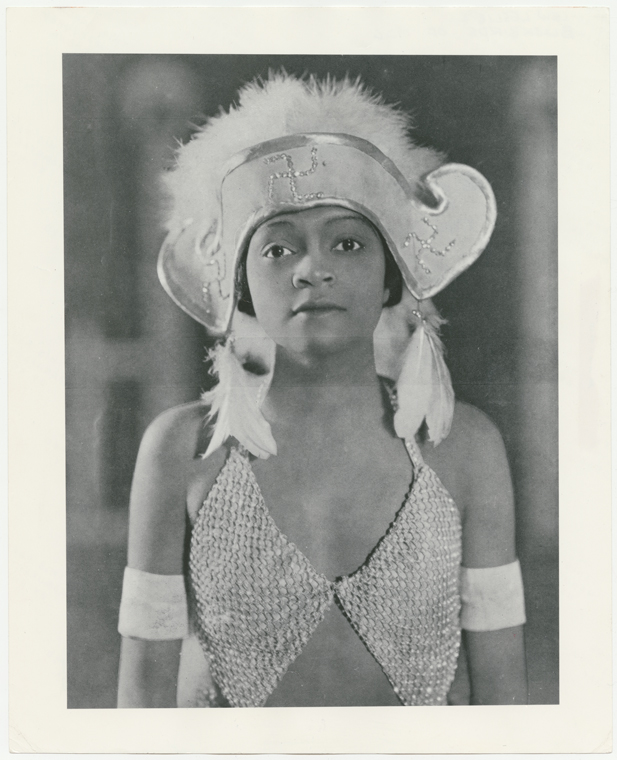
Publicity photograph of Florence Mills in costume for the stage production Blackbirds of 1926.

The show was initiated by the white Jewish American manager-director Lew Leslie (formerly Louis Lesinsky, of Russian Jewish parentage), a former vaudeville performer turned producer who promoted black talent, first in nightclub shows and later in the theatre. Leslie planned all-black annual revue like the Ziegfeld Follies or George White's Scandals. Leslie reportly named Florence Mills as the lead due to her birdlike voice and captivating performance, and her support of equal rights for African Americans. He developed the Blackbirds revue from floorshows at the Plantation Club, a cabaret in Harlem, New York City, attended exclusively by whites.

From this emerged the fast-paced Plantation Revue at the Forty-Eighth Street Theatre and at the Lafayette Theatre, both in Harlem. The English impresario Charles B. Cochran brought the theatre group to the London Pavilion in 1923, in a show called Dover Street to Dixie. The all-black New York edition, Dixie to Broadway, appeared at the Broadhurst Theatre, New York, in 1924-1925, and then went on a national tour. The show was revamped first as Blackbirds of 1925 at the Plantation Club, (Note: Blackbirds of 1925 opened at the Plantation on November 3, 1925. Blackbirds of 1925 is never mentioned in the history of the Blackbirds series. By the time it got to full theatrical presentation, it had become Black Birds of 1926. Originally, Blackbirds was spelt with two separate words as Black Birds, but these were soon merged.) then as Blackbirds of 1926 at the Alhambra Theatre, Harlem. The series were named after Mills' theme song, "I'm a Little Blackbird Looking for a Bluebird", a thinly veiled protest against racial injustice, which she first sung in the Dixie to Broadway show in 1924.

== In Europe ==
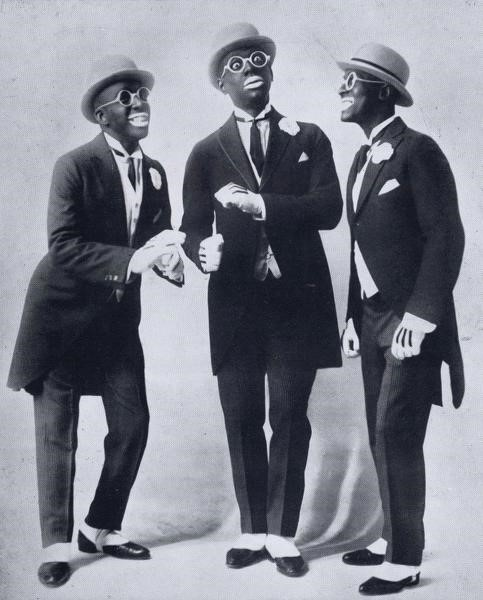
The Three Eddies (Earle "Tiny" Ray, Chick Horsey, and Charles Woody) in Paris.

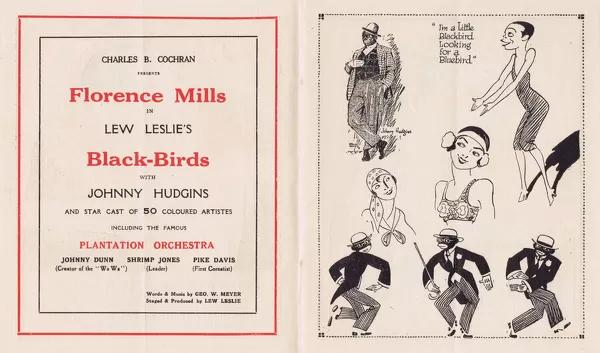
Advertising brochure for Florence Mills in Lew Leslies Blackbirds at the London Pavilion, 1926

After an extended five-week tryout at the Harlem Alhambra, the Blackbirds opened on 28 May 1926 in Paris, at Les Ambassadeurs, newly redesigned as a "theatre-restaurant" that year, to attract the growing number of American tourists, rivalling Josephine Baker's Revue Nègre that had been a tremendous success in 1925. The opening number, "Down South", in which a homecoming Florence Mills burst out of a huge cake on her mammy's birthday, was a big hit. The show was an immediate success, not only for Mills but also for Johnny Hudgins, whose silent pantomime in blackface and white gloves performing his wah-wah routine, his unique dance routine and lip sync done while accompanied by the muted cornet of Johnny Dunn, had an appeal that made him a sensation in Paris. The show of two and a half hours further included the Three Eddies, close-harmony singers and tap-dancers, and the Plantation Orchestra (led by violinist Ralph "Shrimp" Jones).

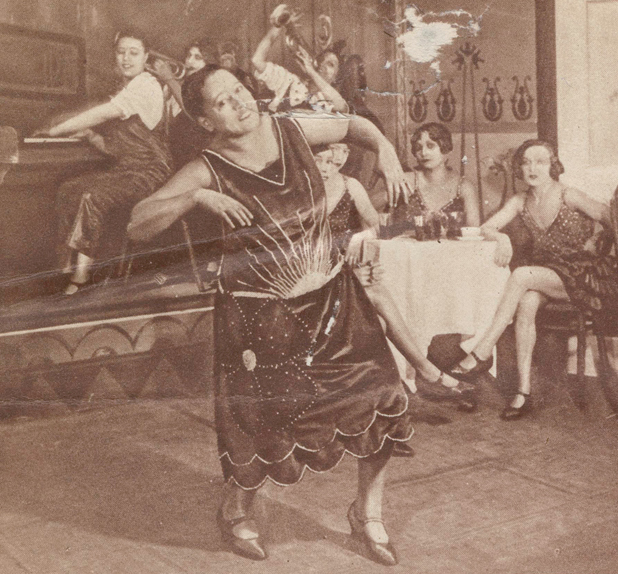
Newspaper clipping with caption "In the hotsy-totsy cabaret: Miss Edith Wilson in the Black Bottom Dance" in the London Blackbirds revue.

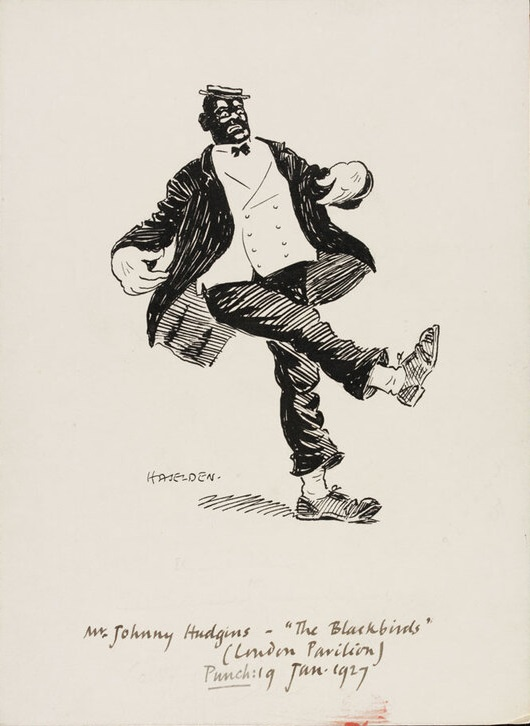
Illustration of Johnny Hudgins in the Blackbirds revue by William Haselden.

In early July, there were some changes in the show's arrangements with the arrival of Paul Whiteman Orchestra and the show was renamed Dixie to Paris. The original idea had been for the Blackbirds to make way for Whiteman's jazz band, but they were too popular. Instead, during the two weeks of Whiteman's stay, the two performances alternated, night after night, at Les Ambassadeurs and the nearby music hall, the Théâtre des Champs-Élysées. (Both venues were managed by Edmond Sayag, the director of the Casino Kursaal in Ostend in Belgium). Irving Aronson's Commanders, one of Whiteman's leading competitors, replaced him mid July.

During the summer holidays in August, the show moved to the fashionable sea-side resort at Ostend beach for a week, after which the Blackbirds returned to Paris. Florence Mills' return to Les Ambassadeurs was "triumphal". The show was revised significantly, with new dances and songs, introducing the Charleston which was sweeping Europe like a storm, before moving to London where C.B. Cochran had booked them.

The London show opened at the London Pavilion, on Piccadilly Circus, on 11 September 1926 and would run for 279 performances well into 1927. As in Paris, the show was a financial and artistic success enthralling audiences and a veritable 'Blackbirds mania' took hold of London's popular cultural life for a while, including Blackbirds-themed society parties. The interest of the young British royals, especially Edward, the Prince of Wales, for the Blackbirds and jazz in general did contribute greatly to the popularity of the revue. By the time the show finished its lengthy run, the prince, who had admired Mills since her first appearance in London in 1923, had seen it at least eleven times. Mills became "the sensation of the season".

The show move on to the Strand Theatre in June 1927 and subsequently set on a tour in England and Scotland with two week runs in the Glasgow Alhambra, the Manchester Palace, and the Liverpool Empire. Exhausted and diagnosed with pelvic tuberculosis, Florence Mills, left the show to rest in the German spa Baden-Baden, before returning to New York City. She died at the age of 31, of infection following an operation on November 1, 1927.

Playbill the second edition of "Lew Leslie's Blackbirds" at the London Pavilion in 1927

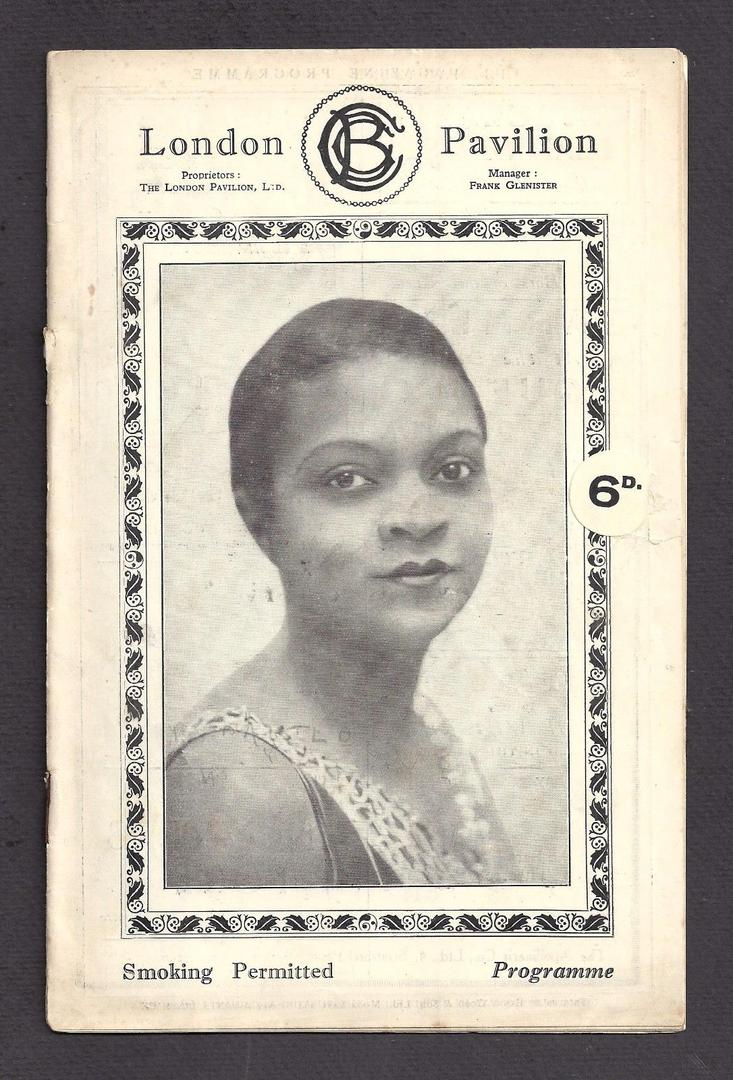

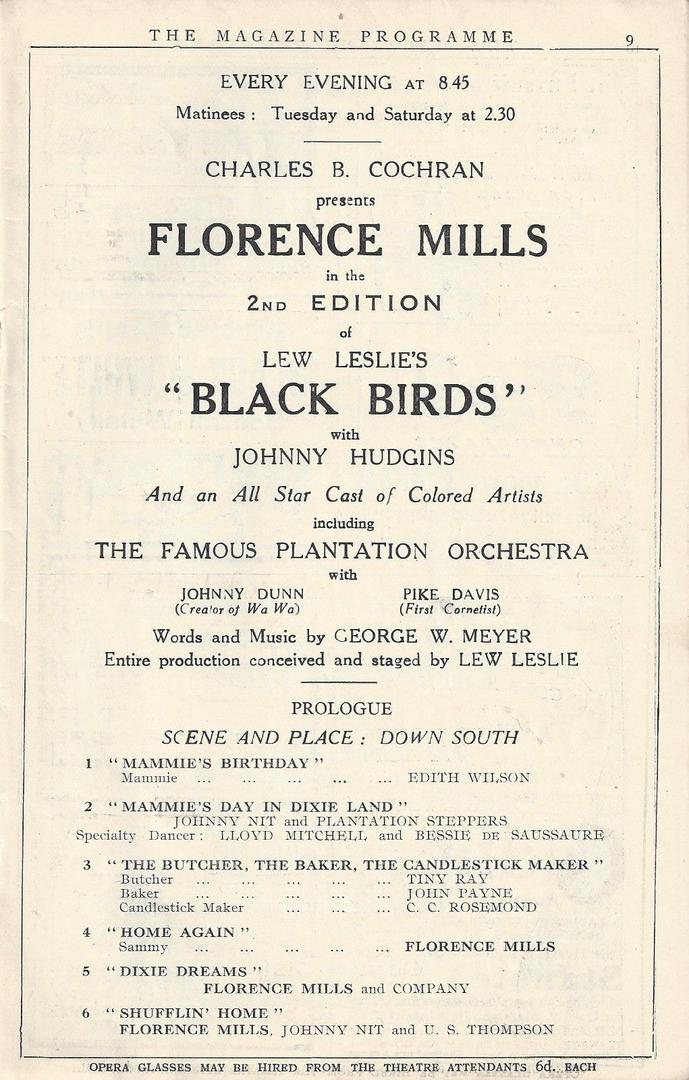

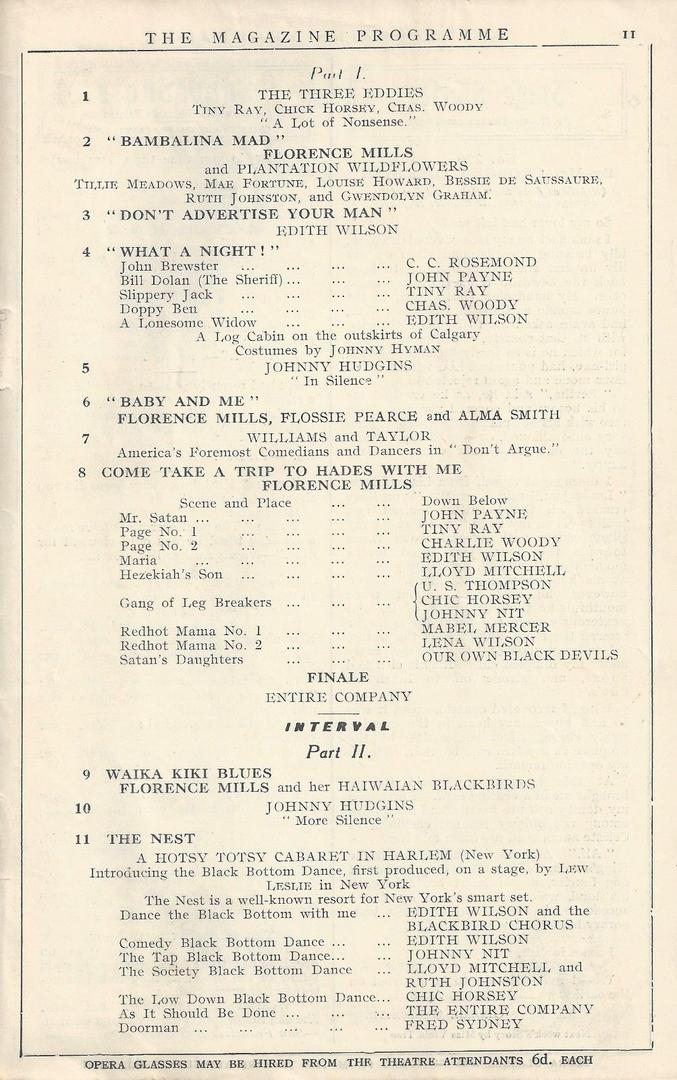

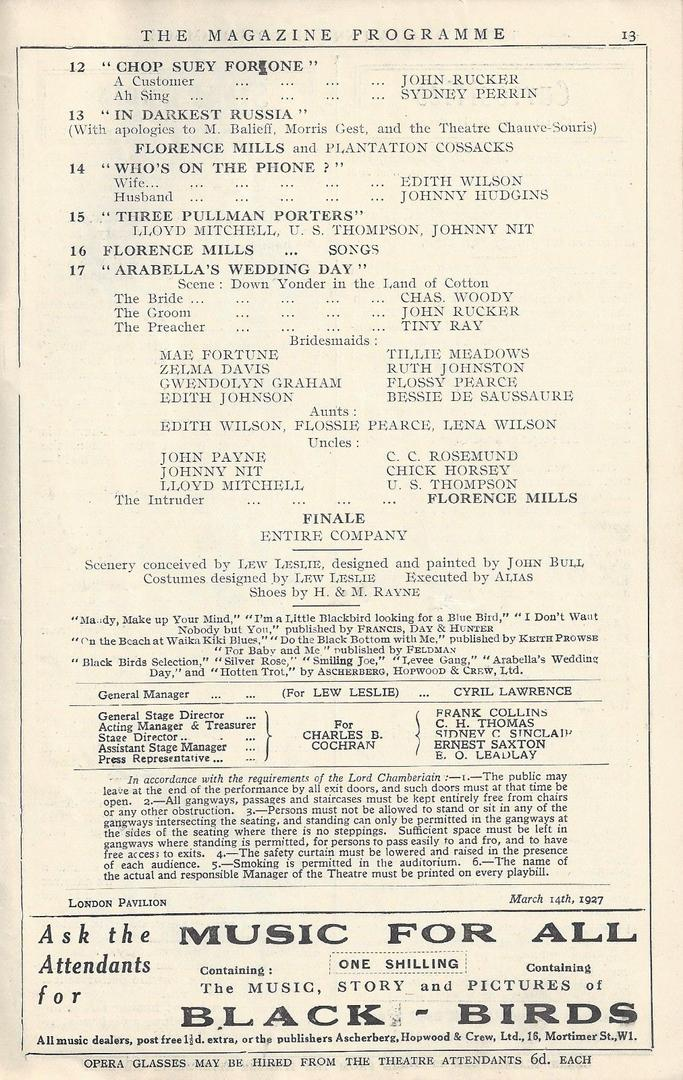

== End and legacy ==
The Blackbirds of 1926 marked Florence Mills' final breakthrough, which was cut short by her tragical early demise. It was also a boost for the careers of other artists, such as Edith Wilson and Johnny Hudgins, who had left the cast in May 1927 to perform at Les Ambassadeurs in Paris where he had become very popular. From an anonymous chorus line dancer performing in Blackbirds of 1926 in Paris, Ruth Bayton achieved star status in France, Germany and Spain; she was known as the 'Josephine Baker of Berlin' when she starred at the Theater des Westens. Leslie had planned to have Mills star in the next edition of Blackbirds. Despite the loss, Leslie continued the series. Blackbirds of 1928 was the most successful, bringing international fame to the dancer Bill "Bojangles" Robinson and the singer Adelaide Hall, who replaced Mills.

The show was a huge success financially as well. In Paris, the opening night's takings allegedly exceeded F450,000 — about $18,000 (equivalent to $327,350 in 2025), and weekly takings throughout the summer never dropped below $35,000 (equivalent to $636,513 in 2025). The opening night at the London Pavilion netted £1,000 (equivalent to $52,848 in 2025) and weekly takings never went below $12,500 (equivalent to $231,681 in 2025) at the box office, setting house records for several nights.

Despite the success and popularity of the black artists among most of the public, the troupe encountered racial prejudice even in cosmopolitan Paris and London, far from the racial segregation in the United States. In Paris, shortly after the opening of Blackbirds at Les Ambassadeurs, a black man and a white woman stepped onto the dance floor during the intermission. A group of Americans objected, and the management asked the man to stop dancing. When he refused, the local tango orchestra was ordered to stop playing. Members of the Plantation Orchestra, sensing the drama of the moment, started playing and the dancers resumed, upon the suggestion of the woman's white husband. The American group again protested causing a further disturbance. Police were called, and the incident was resolved when the husband explained that the black dancer was his guest and was dancing with his wife at his request. The trouble-making Americans were asked to leave. In London, the orchestra at the Pavilion objected to playing alongside black musicians. To avert union action, management had to fire the white musicians temporarily on a 'don't work, pay in full' basis.

== Sources ==
- Bressey, Caroline; Romain, Gemma (2019). "Staging race: Florence Mills, celebrity, identity and performance in 1920s Britain". Women's History Review. 28 (3): 380–395. doi:10.1080/09612025.2018.1493119.
- Egan, Bill (2004). Florence Mills: Harlem Jazz Queen. Lanham, Md.: Scarecrow Press. ISBN 0-8108-5007-9.
- Fry, Andy (2014). Paris Blues: African American Music and French Popular Culture, 1920–1960. Chicago: The University of Chicago Press. ISBN 978-0-226-13878-7.
- Levenstein, Harvey A. (1998). Seductive Journey: American Tourists in France from Jefferson to the Jazz Age. Chicago: University of Chicago Press. ISBN 0-226-47376-7.
- Mander, Raymond; Mitchenson, Joe (1971). Revue: A Story in Pictures. New York: Taplinger Publishing Co. ISBN 978-0-43-209076-3.
- Naumann, Christine (1998). "African American Performers and Culture in Weimar Germany". In McBride, David; Hopkins, Leroy; Blackshire-Belay, C. Aisha (eds.). Crosscurrents: African Americans, Africa, and Germany in the modern world. Columbia, SC: Camden House. pp. 96–105. ISBN 1-57113-098-5.
- Peterson Jr., Bernard L.; Peterson, Bernard L. (1993). A Century of Musicals in Black and White: An Encyclopedia of Musical Stage Works by, about, or involving African Americans. Westport, Conn.: Greenwood Press. ISBN 0-313-26657-3.
- Rye, Howard; Green, Jeffrey (1995). "Black Musical Internationalism in England in the 1920s". Black Music Research Journal. 15 (1): 107. doi:10.2307/779323. JSTOR 779323.
- Wintz, Cary D.; Finkelman, Paul (2004). Encyclopedia of the Harlem Renaissance. New York: Routledge. ISBN 978-1-135-45536-1.
