= Cora Green =

American singer (1895–after 1949)

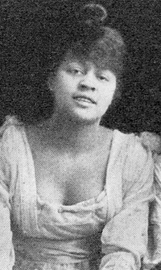
- Cora Green, from a 1916 publicity photograph
- Born: Cora Chambers; December 10, 1895; Baltimore, Maryland
- Died: After 1949
- Notable work: Swing (1938), Moon Over Harlem (1939)

Cora Green (December 10, 1895 – died after 1949) was an American actress, singer, and dancer, billed as "The Famous Creole Singer".

== Early life ==
Cora Chambers was born in Baltimore, Maryland, in 1895, the daughter of Alexander Chambers and Elizabeth Sorrell Chambers.

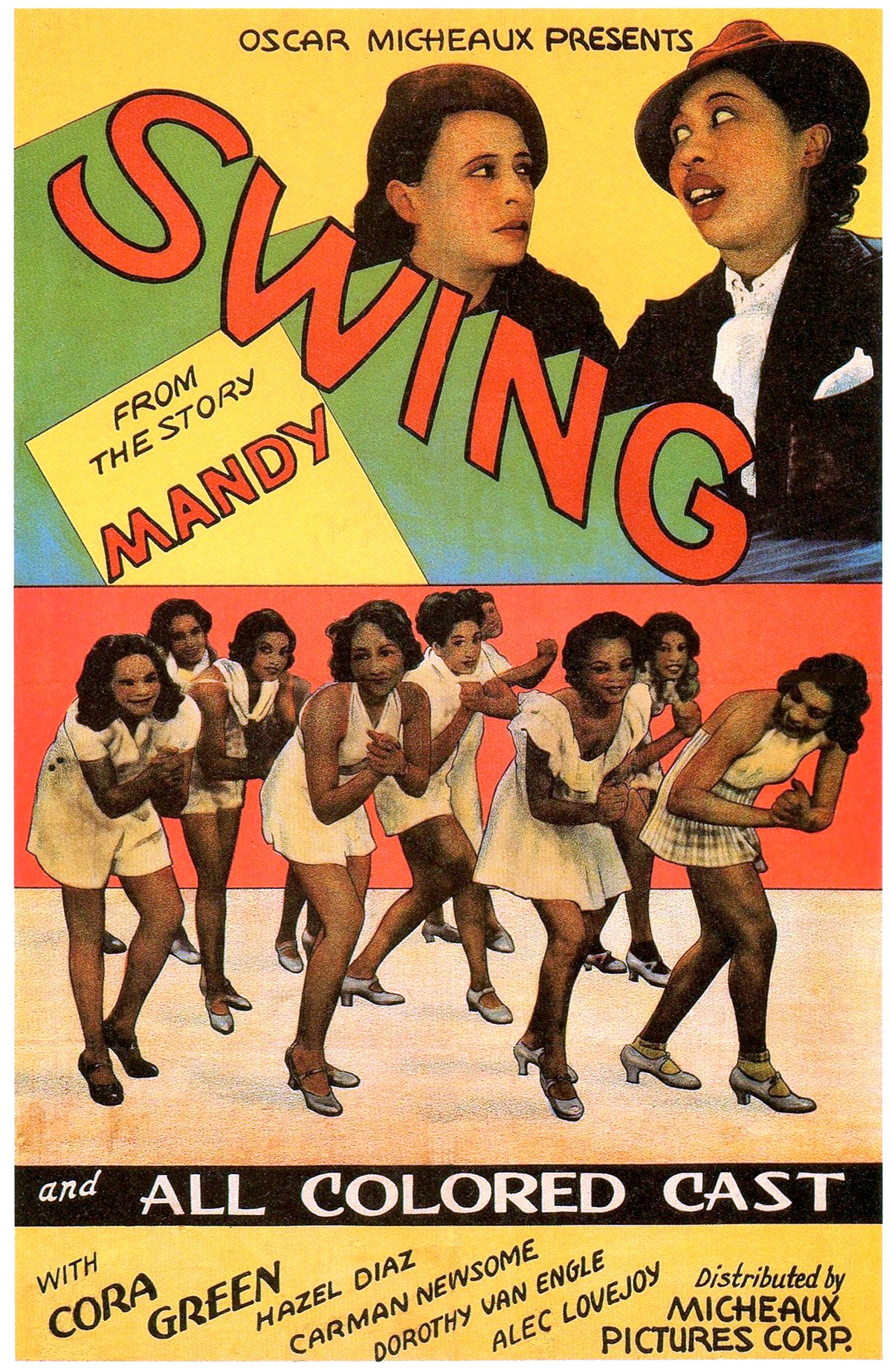
Swing poster

== Career ==
Chambers began singing professionally by her early teens. Alberta Hunter described her voice as being "between sweet and jazz". In 1931 she was considered "the highest paid colored woman in vaudeville."

She sang in Harlem with blueswoman Mattie Hite in 1914. She was part of the Panama Trio with Florence Mills and Ada "Bricktop" Smith at the Panama Club in Chicago, until the club was closed in early 1917. She had vaudeville acts with Hamtree Harrington and Earl Dancer, and appeared in two revues on Broadway, Strut, Miss Lizzie (1922) and Dixie to Broadway (1924–1925).

Her other stage shows included Broadway Rastus (1917), Put and Take (1921), Ebony Showboat (1929), Great Day (1929), Harlem after Dark (1930), Red Light Mazie (1931), Ballyhoola (1932), and Ace in the Hole (1932). She was billed as "Harlem torch singer Cora Green" in a 1933 show in Washington, D.C.

Green sang on a national radio program titled Negro Achievement Hour in 1929. She starred in two musical films, Oscar Micheaux's Swing (1938), and Edgar G. Ulmer's Moon Over Harlem (1939). She also appeared in a musical short, Cora Green: The Famous Creole Singer (1929). During World War II, she toured with the USO in the Persian Gulf, entertaining African-American troops.

== Personal life ==
She married her vaudeville partner Earl Dancer. She attempted suicide in 1918, and divorced Dancer in 1919, but they were working together in 1929, and were said to be planning a reunion in 1949. She was in a relationship with musician Horace Henderson in 1932.

Nothing else is known of Green following news of her planned remarriage to Earl Dancer in 1949 or when she died. Dancer's death occurred in September 1963 in Lake Elsinore, California. It is unknown if the two were married by this point or if Green died before or afterwards.
