= Lena Wilson =

American blues singer (1898–1939)

Background information
- Born: c. 1898; Charlotte, North Carolina, U.S.
- Died: c. 1939 New York City, New York, U.S.
- Genres: Blues, classic female blues
- Instrument: Singer
- Labels: Black Swan; Paramount; Pathé; Victor; Vocalion

Lena Wilson (c. 1898 – c. 1939) was an American blues singer who performed in the classic female blues style. An African-American, Wilson performed in vaudeville with her brother Danny and his wife, Edith Wilson in the late 1910s and 1920s. Wilson made numerous recordings in the 1920s as a solo artist, for labels such as Black Swan, Paramount, Pathé, Victor, and Vocalion.

== Life and career ==
Wilson was born in Charlotte, North Carolina. She was an adopted child. About 1918–1920 she sang with her brother Danny Wilson as a vaudeville act on the Theater Owners Booking Association circuit in the South. In 1921, they performed in Louisville, Kentucky, on a bill with Edith Goodall, who soon married Danny and joined their act. Danny, a pianist who had been trained at a conservatory in Charleston, South Carolina, encouraged Lena and Edith to sing not just blues but also other song forms.

Wilson's major recordings were made between 1922 and 1924 and in 1930. She variously worked with the Nubian Five, Perry Bradford's Jazz Phools, Conaway's Rag Pickers, Fletcher Henderson, Johnny Dunn's Jazz Hounds, Danny Wilson and Edith Wilson. Additionally, she recorded under her own name with the Jazz Hounds, an ensemble featuring Gus Aiken on trumpet, Garvin Bushell on clarinet, Herb Fleming on trombone, John Mitchell on banjo, and Porter Grainger and Cliff Jackson on piano. Among her recordings are "Memphis, Tennessee", "Tain't Nobody's Biz-ness if I Do", "Chiropractor Blues", and "Love Ain't Blind No More".

Wilson sang in many Harlem musical revues throughout the 1920s. She married the violinist Shrimp Jones in the 1930s. She remained a regular performer in New York City into the mid-1930s. She died, reportedly of pneumonia, in New York, about 1939.
