= Lew Leslie =

American writer and producer (1888–1963)

- Born: Lewis Lessinsky; April 15, 1888; Orangeburg, New York, U.S.
- Died: March 10, 1963 (aged 74); New York City, U.S.
- Occupations: Vaudeville entertainer; producer
- Years active: 1910–1950s
- Spouse: Belle Baker (1913–1918)

Lew Leslie (born Lewis Lessinsky; April 15, 1888 – March 10, 1963) was a Jewish American writer and producer of Broadway shows. Leslie got his start in show business in vaudeville in his early twenties. Although white, he was the first major impresario to present African American artists on the Broadway stage. He had two well-known wives, torch singer Belle Baker and Ziegfeld Follies showgirl Irene Wales.

== Career ==
He became famous for his stage shows at the Cotton Club and later for his Blackbirds revues, which he mounted in 1926, 1928, 1930, 1933 and 1939. Blackbirds of 1928 starring Adelaide Hall, Bill "Bojangles" Robinson, Tim Moore and Aida Ward was his most successful revue and ran for over one year on Broadway, where it became the hit of the season. The sell-out show transferred to the Moulin Rouge in Paris, France, where it ran for three months before returning to the U.S., where it commenced an American road tour. Adelaide Hall starred in the show for just over two years. The Blackbirds revues helped advance the career of several famous artists, including Florence Mills, Adelaide Hall, Tim Moore, Bill "Bojangles" Robinson, Aida Ward, Edith Wilson and Lottie Gee.

Leslie began his career doing a patter act in vaudeville. He worked on stage first as an impressionist then in a double act with Belle Baker to whom he was married for a while. Becoming an agent, he listed among his clients Ben Bernie, Frank Fay and Bea Palmer. One of the earliest floorshows Leslie produced was named Aphrodite, which he presented in a Manhattan nightclub in 1922. The show featured a relatively unknown Sally Rand, whose real name was Helen Gould Beck. Ms. Rand later went on to make a fortune by recognising the average American was starved of gleaming white flesh -'I never made any money until I took off my pants.' Leslie then put on a revue starring Belle Baker and Bea Palmer at the Café de Paris, which later became the Plantation Club where Leslie staged Plantation Revue, the second edition of which, in 1922, starred Florence Mills and her husband, dancer Ulysses "Slow Kid" Thompson. Leslie also staged Dixie To Broadway (1924), again starring Mills and Thompson, and then came his Blackbirds revues. At first, these revues were only moderately successful but they paved the way for the sensational hit, Blackbirds of 1928.

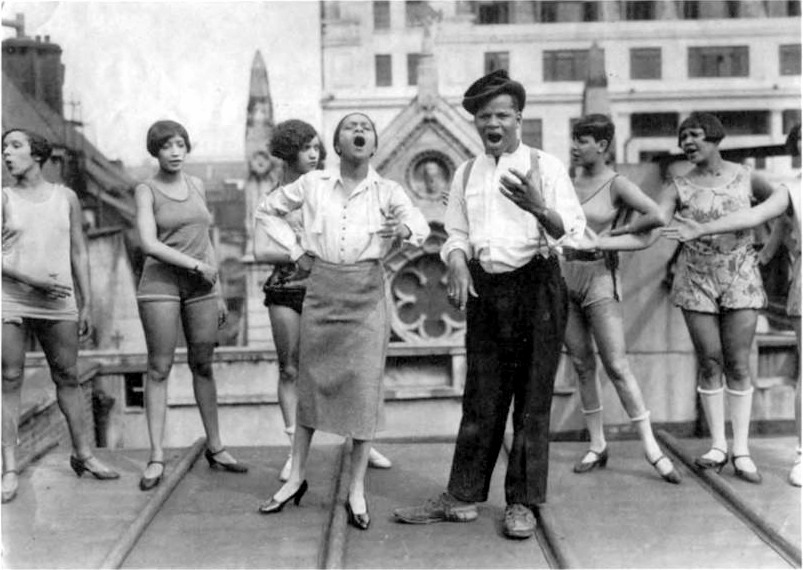
Blackbirds of 1926 – Florence Mills, Johnny Hudgins and chorus girls rehearse on roof of the London Pavilion in September 1926.

The Blackbirds of 1926 featured Florence Mills, Edith Wilson and Johnny Hudgins, and performed first at The Harlem Alhambra in Harlem, New York, before moving overseas to star in the Les Ambassadeurs in Paris, the Casino-Kursaal in Ostend (Belgium) and the London Pavilion. In January 1928, the Blackbirds of 1928 opened at Les Ambassadeurs Club in New York under the heading Lew Leslie's Blackbird Revue, starring Adelaide Hall. On 9 May 1928, the show transferred to the Liberty Theatre, Broadway and was re-titled Blackbirds of 1928. Along with Adelaide Hall, the show also starred Aida Ward and Bill "Bojangles" Robinson. The show ran until August the following year, playing a total of 518 performances. The songs were composed by Jimmy McHugh and Dorothy Fields, both of whom worked on revues at the Cotton Club. For Blackbirds of 1928 they wrote "Baby!", "Dixie" and "Here Comes My Blackbird", and while these had little life outside the show the same cannot be said for others that became popular: "Diga Diga Doo", "Doin' The New Low-Down", "I Must Have That Man" and what became a perennial favourite, "I Can't Give You Anything but Love, Baby".

Leslie's shows that followed included several editions of Blackbirds, the most successful of which were produced for more receptive audiences in Great Britain, from 1934 to 1937. Ethel Waters appeared in the 1930 edition in New York, while the 1934 show had Robinson, and the 1936 show, which also ran in London, featured an appearance by the Nicholas Brothers. The last of the series, Blackbirds of 1939, produced in New York, included in its cast Lena Horne, whom Leslie called "the New Florence Mills". Interspersed amidst these revues were other Leslie ventures, including The International Revue (1930) and Rhapsody In Black (1931). Although not among the leading Broadway moguls of the '20s, Leslie helped make an important contribution to the integrating of the Broadway musical.

== Birth ==
Confusion surrounds Leslie's place of birth. On his World War I draft registration card of June 1917, Leslie stated that he was an alien and was born in Russia on April 15, 1888. His brother Saul Leslie's draft card gives Saul's birth date as May 26, 1886; Saul was also listed as an employee of his theatrical producing brother, Lew. He also appears on the 1910 census as Louis Lesinsky, with his parents Max and Mary Lesinsky and brother Saul (also known as Sol); they lived in Manhattan and Max, aged 50, was a butcher. In the 1920 census they appear again, but this time as Max Leslie, 60, Mary Leslie, 54, Sol Leslie, 32, and Louie Leslie, 30; all were listed as born in Russia, except for Lew who is now listed as born in England. But the year of emigration to America is the same, 1890. Leslie also stated he was born to Jewish parents in Orangeburg, New York.

== Death ==
Lew Leslie died in 1963 in Rockland State Hospital in Orangeburg, New York, still hoping to the last to revive a new version of his old show, Rhapsody in Black.

== See also ==
- African-American musical theater
- Williams, Iain Cameron. (2002). Underneath A Harlem Moon ISBN 0-8264-5893-9
- Williams, Iain Cameron. (2022) The KAHNS of Fifth Avenue, iwp Publishing, February 17, 2022, ISBN 978-1916146587 - chapters 10 & 11 cover the staging of Blackbirds of 1928 and Lew Leslie's tenure at Les Ambassedeur's.
