= Edith Wilson (singer) =

American blues singer and vaudeville performer (1896–1981)

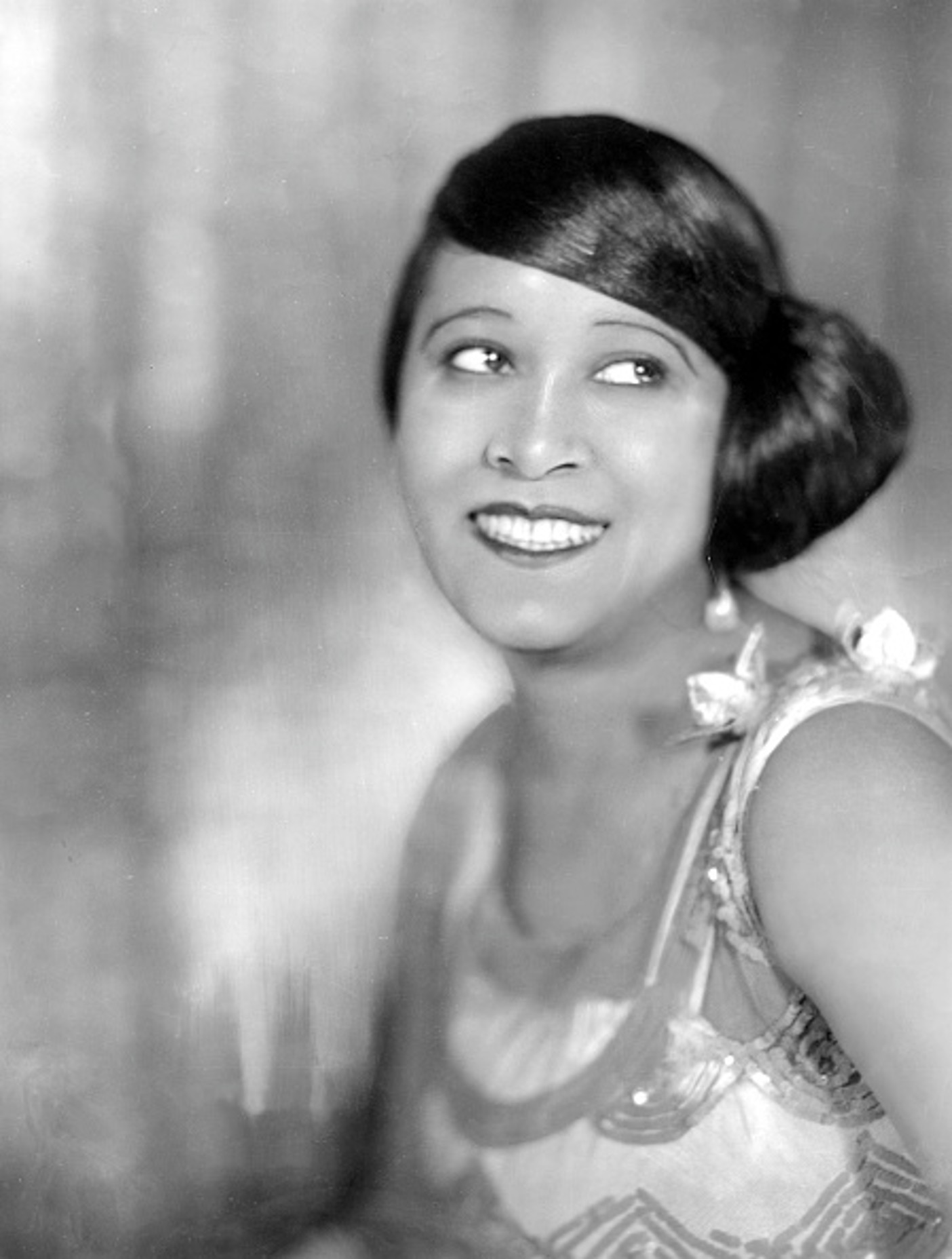
- Edith Wilson in 1928

Background information
- Born: Edith Goodall; September 2, 1896; Louisville, Kentucky, U.S.
- Died: March 31, 1981 (aged 84) Chicago, Illinois, U.S.
- Genre: Blues
- Occupations: Singer, performer
- Years active: 1919–1980
- Labels: Columbia, Brunswick, Victor
- Spouse(s): Danny Wilson (m. 1921–1928) Millard Wilson (m. 1947–1981)

Edith Wilson (née Goodall; September 2, 1896 – March 31, 1981) was an American blues singer, vaudeville performer, and actress from Louisville, Kentucky, U.S.. An African-American who performed and recorded in the classic female blues style in the 1920s, Wilson worked in vaudeville and stage productions, first in Louisville and later throughout the U.S. and abroad. From the 1930s onward, she acted in radio plays and television, and from 1948 to 1966 represented the Aunt Jemima brand for Quaker Oats in personal appearances and on television. She remained an active performer until 1980.

== Early career ==
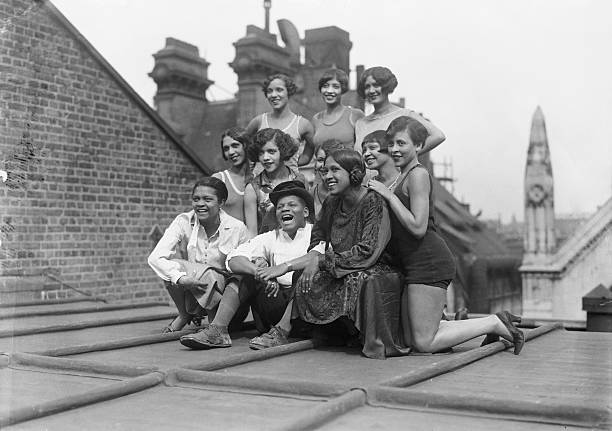
Blackbirds of 1926 on the London Pavilion roof. Front row (left to right): Florence Mills, Johnny Hudgins and Edith Wilson.

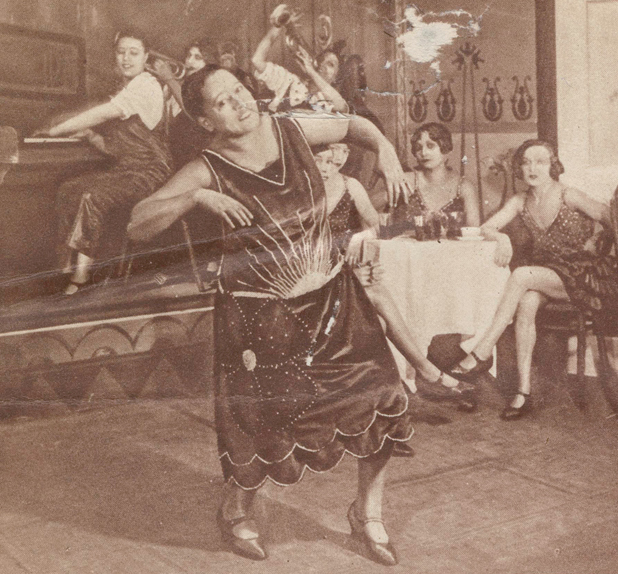
Wilson performing the Black Bottom Dance in the London stage production of Lew Leslie's Blackbirds of 1926

She was born Edith Goodall on September 2, 1896, in Louisville, Kentucky, one of three children to Susan Jones and Hundley Goodall, a teacher. (Her birthdate is often stated as ten years later, but this was due to vanity.) She hailed from a well-educated Louisville family who fully supported her career ambitions, and she went on to perform in concerts across the country.

Her first professional experience came in 1919 in Louisville's Park Theater. The singer Lena Wilson and her brother, Danny, performed in Louisville; she joined their act. Edith was married to Danny Wilson from 1921 until his death in 1928. Danny, a pianist who had been trained at a conservatory in Charleston, South Carolina, encouraged Lena and Edith to sing not just blues but also other song forms. Together the trio performed on the East Coast in 1920–1921, and when they were in New York City Wilson was signed by Columbia, which recorded her in 1921 with Johnny Dunn's Jazz Hounds.

Amidst the African-American cultural emancipation of the Harlem Renaissance, her recording debut came with Perry Bradford's "Nervous Blues." That September, backed by Dunn's band, she cut sessions that marked the first recordings by an African-American blues singer on Columbia Records. She recorded 17 songs with Dunn in 1921 and 1922. In 1924 she worked with Fletcher Henderson in New York, where she was slated to sing with Coleman Hawkins, but Hawkins refused to perform because he wanted additional compensation.

== Overseas ==
She remained a nightclub and theater singer, working for years on the New York entertainment scene with the Theater Owners Booking Association (TOBA) circuit. In 1922, Broadway producer Lew Leslie caught a performance by Wilson with Dunn and the Jazz Hounds in one of Bradford's shows. Impressed, he approached Bradford with an offer to bring Edith and the Jazz Hounds into the new Plantation Revue, where she'd share the stage with Florence Mills. It was there that Wilson performed the song that would become forever linked to her name: "He May Be Your Man, but He Comes to See Me Sometimes."

Starting with From Dover Street to Dixie in London in 1923, alongside Florence Mills, Wilson started to perform abroad. In 1925 she embarked on an extended tour with Sam Wooding's Orchestra as part of the revue Chocolate Kiddies, traveling through England, much of Europe, Russia, and eventually South America.

She also featured with Mills in Leslie's long-running revue Blackbirds of 1926, and moved overseas to star in the Les Ambassadeurs in Paris, the Casino-Kursaal in Ostend (Belgium) and the London Pavilion. In the show she sang and danced the 'Black Bottom' and played "a rather saucy bed and telephone" sketch called 'Who's On the Phone' with Johnny Hudgins. After the show in London closed, Wilson stayed in Europe to perform across several cities. Parisian audiences embraced her, and she reciprocated by rapidly picking up French songs to add to her repertoire. She found Paris receptive to a "colored chanteuse" whose act featured suggestive lyrics and cheeky wit.

She worked with Duke Ellington's Orchestra in Jazzmania (1927). In 1929, she performed with the Hot Chocolates revue, performing alongside Louis Armstrong and Fats Waller, and made appearances with Bill Robinson, Alberta Hunter, Cab Calloway, and Noble Sissle. Wilson remained a popular Columbia artist, but recorded far less than other female blues stars of the 1920s such as Bessie Smith. After she left Columbia in 1925, she recorded one record for Brunswick in 1929 and a handful of sides for Victor in 1930.

She returned to Europe in 1928, touring with Sam Wooding and his Chocolate Kiddies in The Black Revue, and went on to work in Berlin theaters (Die Schwarze Revue premiered in the Ufa-Palast am Zoo) and Paris clubs until 1929. In the 1930s she appeared in Shuffle Along (1932–1933), Blackbirds (1933–1934), and numerous other shows. She performed in Parisian nightclubs in 1931–1932 and in the London staging of Blackbirds in 1934, then touring Europe again with Sam Wooding's band in Rhapsody in Black in 1935. In the mid-1930s she also sang with top big bands, including those of Cab Calloway, Noble Sissle, Jimmie Lunceford, and Lucky Millinder.

Wilson did extensive work as an actress, appearing on radio in The Great Gildersleeve, on radio and television in Amos 'n' Andy, and on film in To Have and Have Not (1944). She also performed with the United Service Organizations (USO) on U.S. military bases during World War II. She met Millard Wilson, serendipitously with the same last name, and they married in 1947.

== Aunt Jemima ==
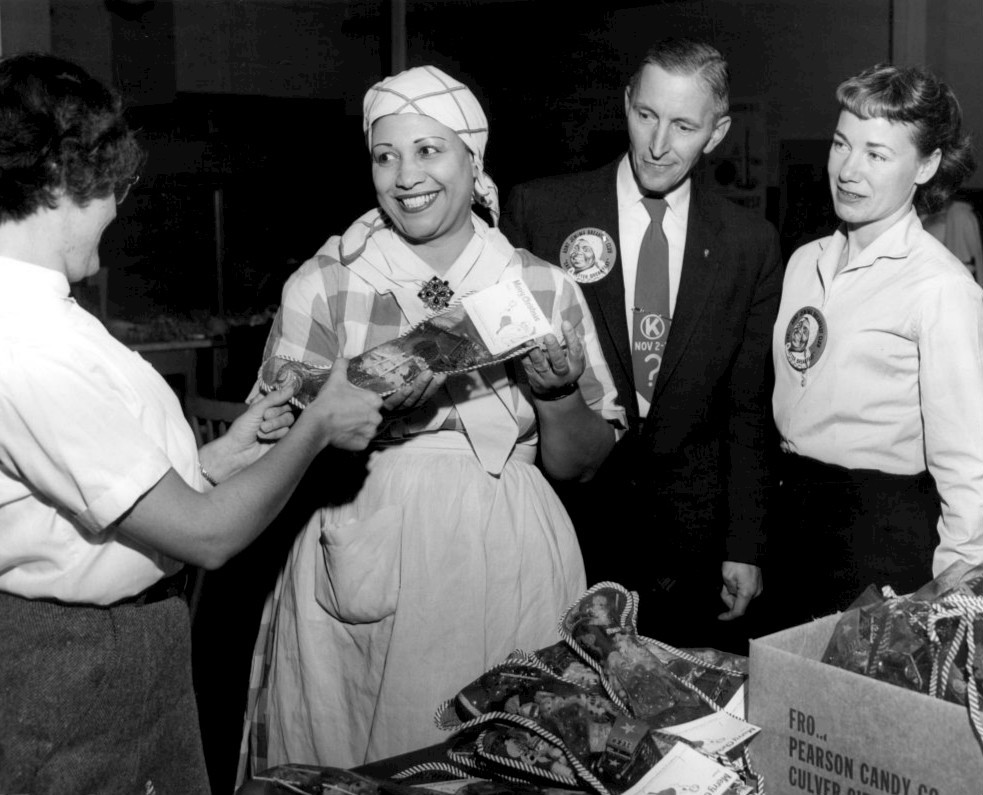
Wilson as Aunt Jemima in a 1956 appearance at the Seattle Kiwanis Club Pancake Festival

In 1948, Wilson became the face of Aunt Jemima, breakfast brand for pancake mix, table syrup, and other breakfast food products for Quaker Oats. She was the first Aunt Jemima to appear in television commercials. As Aunt Jemima, Wilson received the Key to the City of Albion, Michigan, on January 25, 1964. Over the years, however, the character came to be seen increasingly to be a (in)famous example of, the "Mammy" archetype, the loyal domestic servant of legend that originated during the days of slavery in the Southern United States. Throughout this period, the NAACP and other civil rights organizations campaigned against these racist portrayals of African-American life.

Although "her appearance as Aunt Jemima on early commercials was criticized as demeaning", she bitterly disagreed with those who said that her performances were "impeding racial progress," and was proud of what she considered the aura of dignity she brought to the character. Quaker Oats ended local appearances for Aunt Jemima in 1965, and ended her employment in 1966. In a 1979 interview, she continued to defend her Aunt Jemina appearances, arguing that it honored the life of an actual Black woman.

Wilson devoted time to professional and charitable activities for Black musicians and actors. In 1963, she became executive secretary for the Negro Actors Guild, and was involved with the National Association of Negro Musicians that assisted talented children into the 1970s. She was also active with Chicago's Theatrical Cheer Club, a group of veteran entertainers and musicians dedicated to raising money for the city's musicians.

== Comeback, death and legacy ==
Wilson made a comeback in 1973 to play with Eubie Blake, Little Brother Montgomery, and Terry Waldo. Her career saw a revival and in 1976 she recorded a blues album, He May Be Your Man (But He Comes to See Me Sometimes), for the Delmark label, backed by a band of veteran musicians led from the piano by Montgomery. Her last live show was at the 1980 Newport Jazz Festival.

Wilson died of a brain tumor in Chicago on March 31, 1981. In 2020, the Killer Blues Headstone Project placed a headstone for Edith Wilson at Mt. Glenwood Cemetery in Thornton, Illinois. Unlike singers like Bessie Smith, Wilson never was a blues shouter, nor was she a country blues singer. Instead, she belonged to the cabaret blues tradition, alongside contemporaries like Ethel Waters and Alberta Hunter, and she remained one of that style's foremost performers for nearly six decades.

== Sources ==
- Egan, Bill (2004). Florence Mills: Harlem Jazz Queen. Lanham, Md.: Scarecrow Press. ISBN 0-8108-5007-9.
- Harrison, Daphne Duval (1988). Black Pearls: Blues Queens of the 1920s. New Brunswick, NJ: Rutgers University Press. ISBN 0-8135-1279-4.
- Kern-Foxworth, Marilyn (1994). Aunt Jemima, Uncle Ben, and Rastus: Blacks in Advertising, Yesterday, Today, and Tomorrow. Westport, Conn.: Greenwood Press. ISBN 0-313-26798-7.
- Manring, Maurice M. (1998). Slave in a Box: The Strange Career of Aunt Jemima. Charlottesville, VA: University Press of Virginia. ISBN 0-8139-1782-4.
- Russell, Tony (1997). The Blues: From Robert Johnson to Robert Cray. New York: Schirmer Books. ISBN 0-02-864862-5.
- Wintz, Cary D.; Finkelman, Paul (2004). Encyclopedia of the Harlem Renaissance. Vol. 2 K-Y. New York: Routledge. ISBN 1-57958-389-X.
- Wipplinger, Jonathan O. (2017). The Jazz Republic: Music, Race, and American Culture in Weimar Germany. Ann Arbor: University of Michigan Press.
