= Aida Ward =

American jazz musician (1900–1984)

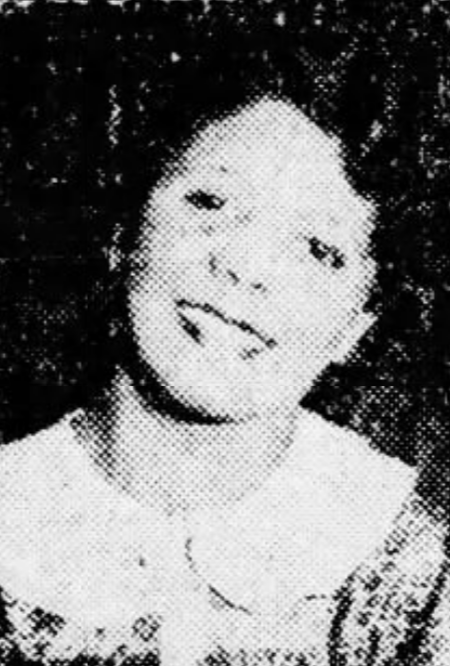
- Ward, from a 1930 newspaper
- Born: February 11, 1900; Washington, D.C., U.S.
- Died: June 23, 1984 (aged 84)
- Occupation: Jazz singer

Aida Ward (February 11, 1900 – June 23, 1984) was an American jazz singer. Born in Washington, D.C., Ward rose to fame in the 1920s and 1930s in New York, on Broadway and at Harlem's Cotton Club. She appeared alongside Adelaide Hall and Bill "Bojangles" Robinson in the hit Broadway musical revue Blackbirds of 1928.

Throughout the 1930s, Ward appeared regularly at the Cotton Club, performing with Duke Ellington and Cab Calloway. She was associated with the introduction of the songs "Between the Devil and the Deep Blue Sea" and "I've Got the World on a String" at the Cotton Club in 1931-2. She also starred at Harlem's Apollo Theater.

== See also ==
- Adelaide Hall
- Cotton Club
- Williams, Iain Cameron (2002). Underneath A Harlem Moon ISBN 0-8264-5893-9
