= Florence Mills =

American cabaret singer, dancer, and comedian (1896–1927)

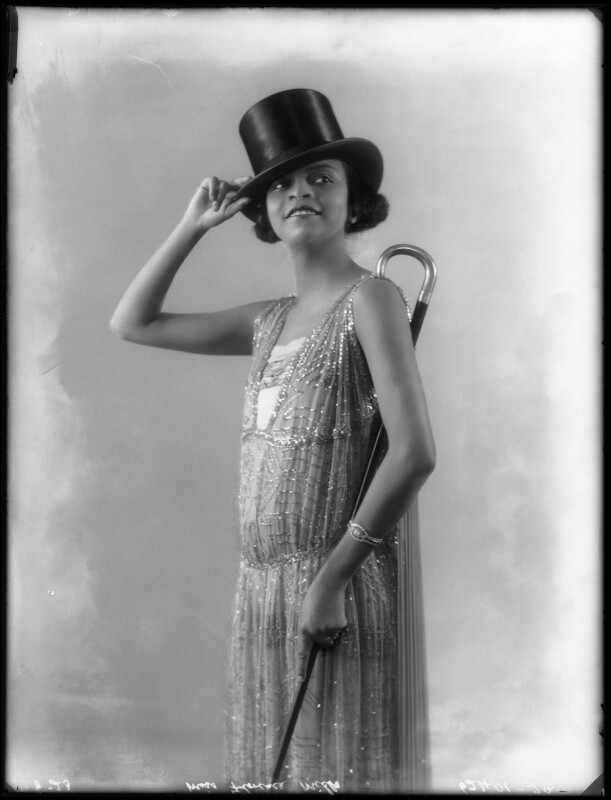
- Born: Florence Winfrey; January 25, 1896; Washington, D.C., U.S.
- Died: November 1, 1927 (aged 31); New York City, New York, U.S.
- Other name: Florence Mills
- Occupations: Singer, dancer, entertainer
- Years active: 1901–1927
- Spouse: Ulysses "Slow Kid" Thompson (m. 1921)

Florence Mills (born Florence Winfrey; January 25, 1896 – November 1, 1927), billed as the "Queen of Happiness", was an American cabaret singer, dancer, and comedian.

== Life and career ==
Florence Mills (Florence Winfrey) was born a daughter of formerly enslaved parents Nellie (Simon) and John Winfrey in 1896 in Washington, D.C. She began performing as a child. At the age of six she sang duets with her two older sisters, Olivia and Maude. They eventually formed a vaudeville act, calling themselves the Mills Sisters. The act did well, appearing in theaters along the Atlantic seaboard. Florence's sisters eventually quit performing, but Florence stayed with it, determined to pursue a career in show business. She joined Ada Smith, Cora Green, and Carolyn Williams in the Panama Four, which had some success. She then joined a traveling Black show, the Tennessee Ten, and in 1917 she met the dance director and acrobatic dancer Ulysses "Slow Kid" Thompson (1888–1990), to whom she would be married from 1921 until her death.

Mills became well known in New York as a result of her role in the Broadway musical Shuffle Along (1921) at Daly's 63rd Street Theatre (barely on Broadway), one of the events marking the beginning of the Harlem Renaissance. She received favorable reviews in London, Paris, Ostend, Liverpool, and other European venues. She told the press that despite her years in vaudeville, she credited Shuffle Along with launching her career.

After Shuffle Along, Lew Leslie, a white promoter, hired Mills and Thompson to appear nightly at the Plantation Club. The revue featured Mills and a wide range of Black artists, including visiting performers such as Paul Robeson. In 1922, Leslie turned the nightclub acts into a Broadway show, The Plantation Revue. It opened at the Forty-Eighth Street Theatre on July 22. The English theatrical impresario Charles B. Cochran brought the Plantation company to London, and they appeared at the London Pavilion in spring 1923 in a show he produced called Dover Street to Dixie. The show featured a local all-white cast in the first half and Mills starring with the all-Black Plantation cast in the second half.

In 1924 she headlined at the Palace Theatre, and became an international star with the hit show Lew Leslie's Blackbirds of 1926 at the Les Ambassadeurs in Paris, in Ostend and the London Pavilion in 1926, alongside other up-and-coming artists such as Johnny Hudgins and Edith Wilson. Among her fans when she toured Europe was the then Prince of Wales, Edward, who told the press that he had seen Blackbirds 11 times.

Many in the black press admired her popularity and saw her as a role model: not only was she a great entertainer but she was also able to serve as "an ambassador of good will from the blacks to the whites... a living example of the potentialities of the Negro of ability when given a chance to make good".

Mills was featured in Vogue and Vanity Fair and was photographed by Bassano's studios and Edward Steichen. Her signature song was her biggest hit, "I'm a Little Blackbird Looking for a Bluebird". Another of her hit songs was "I'm Cravin' for that Kind of Love".

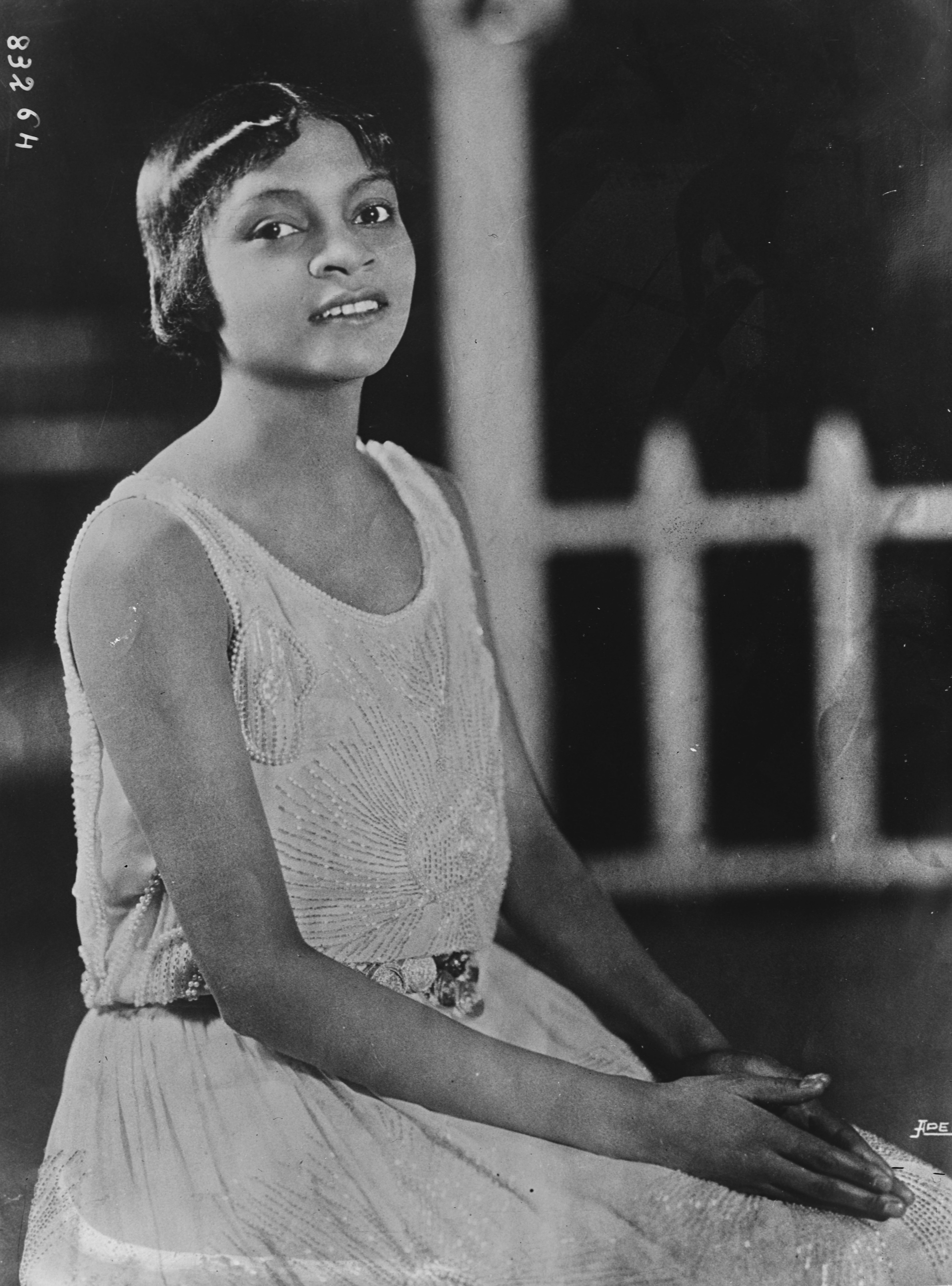
1923

== Death ==
Exhausted from more than 300 performances of the hit show Blackbirds in London in 1926, she became ill with tuberculosis. She died of infection following an operation at the Hospital for Joint Diseases in New York City, New York on November 1, 1927. She was 31 years old. Most sources, including black newspapers, such as the Chicago Defender and the Pittsburgh Courier, and mainstream publications, including the New York Times and the Boston Globe, reported that she died of complications from appendicitis.

Her death shocked the music world. The New York Times reported that more than 10,000 people visited the funeral home to pay their respects; thousands attended her funeral, including James Weldon Johnson, president of the National Association for the Advancement of Colored People, and stars of the stage, vaudeville and dance. Honorary pall bearers included singers Ethel Waters, Cora Green, and Lottie Gee, all of whom had performed with Mills. Dignitaries and political figures of different races sent their condolences. She is buried at Woodlawn Cemetery, in the Bronx, New York.

Her widower, Ulysses Thompson, a native of Prescott, Arkansas, was a dancer and comedian, having learned his trade in the world of circuses and travelling medicine shows in the early years of the century. He subordinated his career to hers, acting as her manager, promoter, minder and companion. After her death, he continued performing, travelling around the world, including appearances in China and Australia, until the late 1930s. He later married Gertrude Curtis, New York's first black woman dentist (1911) and the widow of the lyricist Cecil Mack (born as Richard Cecil McPherson). Thompson outlived both of his wives; he died in 1990, at the age of 101, in Little Rock, Arkansas.

== Legacy ==
Mills is credited with having been a staunch and outspoken supporter of equal rights for African Americans, with her signature song "I'm a Little Blackbird" being a plea for racial equality. During her life she broke many racial barriers.

After her death, Duke Ellington memorialized Mills in his composition Black Beauty. Fats Waller also memorialized Mills in a song, Bye Bye Florence, recorded in Camden, New Jersey, on November 1, 1927, featuring Bert Howell on vocals with organ by Waller; Florence was recorded with Juanita Stinette Chappell on vocals and Waller on organ. Other songs recorded the same day include You Live On in Memory and Gone but Not Forgotten—Florence Mills, neither of which were composed by Waller.

English composer Constant Lambert - also a friend and champion of Duke Ellington - saw Florence Mills when she performed in Dover Street to Dixie at the London Pavilion in 1923, and again when she visited London a second time in 1926-7 for her show Blackbirds. On her death Lambert immediately wrote the piano piece Elegiac Blues in tribute, orchestrating it the following year. The rising triplet near the beginning (bar 8) is a quote from the fanfare that opened Blackbirds.

The Florence Mills Theatre opened on 8 December 1930 at 3511 South Central Avenue, Los Angeles. The 740-seat theater was commissioned by Sam Kramer. On opening night almost 1,000 people lined the street, with 10 police officers holding back the crowds.

A residential building at 267 Edgecombe Avenue in Harlem's Sugar Hill neighborhood is named after her.

Mills was pictured on a postage stamp issued by the island of Grenada in honor of "The Birth of the Silver Screen".

A biography by Bill Egan entitled Florence Mills: Harlem: Jazz Queen was published in 2006, and a children's book, Baby Flo: Florence Mills Lights Up the Stage, by Alan Schroeder, was published by Lee and Low in 2012.

Mills is referenced in the 2023 video game Marvel's Spider-Man 2, with a picture of her and a pair of her shoes appearing in a musical heritage museum.

== See also ==
- Florence Mills House in New York City at 220 West 135th Street was believed to be where Florence Mills lived from 1910 to 1927. In 1976, the site was designated a National Historic Landmark maintained as a landmark by the National Park Service, but the designation was withdrawn in 2009.
- Flo-Bert Awards, named in honor of Florence Mills and Bert Williams.
- List of people from Harlem
