= Orson Welles radio credits =

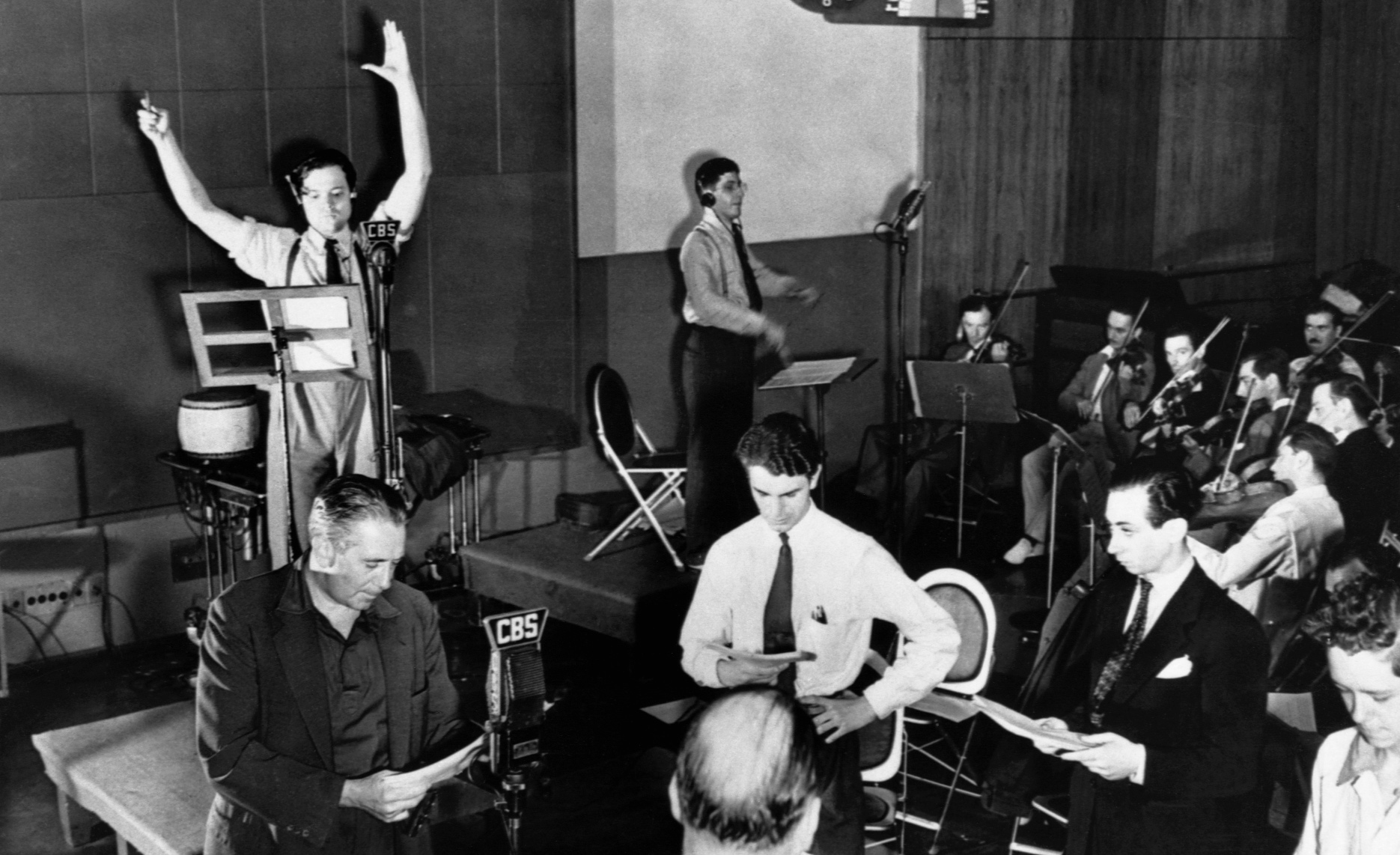
Orson Welles, arms upraised, directing a rehearsal of CBS Radio's The Mercury Theatre on the Air (1938)

This is a comprehensive listing of the radio programs made by Orson Welles. Welles was often uncredited for his work, particularly in the years 1934–1937, and he apparently kept no record of his broadcasts.

Radio is what I love most of all. The wonderful excitement of what could happen in live radio, when everything that could go wrong did go wrong. I was making a couple of thousand a week, scampering in ambulances from studio to studio, and committing much of what I made to support the Mercury. I wouldn't want to return to those frenetic 20-hour working day years, but I miss them because they are so irredeemably gone.

— Orson Welles to friend and mentor Roger Hill, February 22, 1983

== 1934 ==
Date	Network	Length	Series	Details	Surviving recording	Involvement			
Date	Network	Length	Series	Details	Surviving recording	Actor	Director	Producer	Writer
1934	CBS	30 min.	The American School of the Air	(Note: Welles is introduced to director Knowles Entrikin by Paul Stewart, and is given his first job on radio.) (Note: Educational program broadcast every weekday afternoon, required listening in many U.S. classrooms. Cast: Ray Collins, Orson Welles, Joseph Cotten, Parker Fennelly, Betty Garde, Mitzi Gould, Chester Stratton, other actors in the New York radio pool.)		Yes			

== 1935 ==
Date	Network	Length	Series	Details	Surviving recording	Involvement			
Date	Network	Length	Series	Details	Surviving recording	Actor	Director	Producer	Writer
March 22	CBS	30 min.	The March of Time	Welles's series debut (Note: Paul Stewart sees Welles's lead performance in Archibald MacLeish's play Panic and recommends him to director Homer Fickett. Welles auditions for and wins a place in The March of Time repertory company. In his debut appearance, Welles performs a scene from Panic for a news report on the March 14–16 stage production; for another report he voices all five Dionne quintuplets. Cast: Westbrook Van Voorhis (announcer), Bill Adams (FDR), Agnes Moorehead (Eleanor Roosevelt), Maurice Tarplin (Churchill), Dwight Weist (Hitler), Peter Donald (Chamberlain), Ted de Corsia (Mussolini), Orson Welles, Ray Collins, Arnold Moss, Paul Stewart, Will Geer, Alice Frost, Martin Gabel, Jeanette Nolan, others. Museum of Broadcasting: "Welles contributed to the series intermittently from 1935 to 1938 … Little written documentation exists".)		Yes			
July 14 – September 22	CBS	60 min.	America's Hour	(Note: Patriotic documentary drama created by William S. Paley. Cast: Orson Welles, Ray Collins, Joseph Cotten, Betty Garde, Agnes Moorehead, Howard Barlow (music), Dwight Cooke (producer), Max Wylie (producer).)		Yes			
August 26	CBS	15 min.	The March of Time	(Note: Welles becomes a regular member of the prestigious company of actors when the series becomes a daily program.)		Yes			
December 13	CBS	15 min.	Chopin	(Note: Dramatization of the life of Frédéric Chopin, with readings by Welles and music by Alexander Semmler. Sponsored by the National Tuberculosis Association Christmas seal campaign.)		Yes			
1935	CBS	30 min.	Cavalcade of America	(Note: Dramatizations of American history. Cast: John McIntire, Jeanette Nolan, Agnes Moorehead, Kenny Delmar, Edwin Jerome, Ray Collins, Orson Welles, Karl Swenson, Ted Jewett, Jack Smart, Paul Stewart, Bill Johnstone, Frank Readick, Raymond Edward Johnson, Ted de Corsia, Everett Sloane, Luis Van Rooten. Welles: "After the show DuPont complained that I injected political commentary about Rockefeller, and they were right. I had made their wonderful old gentleman seem like Scrooge.")		Yes			

== 1936 ==
Date	Network	Length	Series	Details	Surviving recording	Involvement			
Date	Network	Length	Series	Details	Surviving recording	Actor	Director	Producer	Writer
January 20– July 18	CBS	15 min.	Musical Reveries	(Note: Cast: Orson Welles (poetry), Ken Wood's Orchestra and Stuart Churchill, tenor (music). Broadcast four days a week (Monday, Wednesday, Friday, Saturday). Paid $50 for each broadcast, Welles is discharged when, exhausted beyond endurance, he delivers an Elizabeth Barrett Browning sonnet in double-talk.)		Yes			
March 13	CBS	15 min.	The March of Time		Yes	Yes			
March 22	CBS	30 min.	Terror by Night	"The Bells" (Note: Cast: Orson Welles, Ray Collins, Martha Scott, Earle McGill (director).)		Yes			
May 11	CBS	15 min.	The March of Time		Yes	Yes			
May 13	CBS	15 min.	The March of Time		Yes	Yes			
May 14	CBS	15 min.	The March of Time		Yes	Yes			
May 20	CBS	15 min.	The March of Time		Yes	Yes			
May 27	CBS	15 min.	The March of Time		Yes	Yes			
July 18	CBS	30 min.	Columbia Workshop	Series debut (Note: Two one-act plays: A Comedy of Danger by Richard Hughes, and The Finger of God by Percival Wilde. Directed by Myron Sattler. Cast: Orson Welles, Eustace Wyatt, Arnold Moss.)	Yes	Yes			
September 6	Mutual	60 min.	The Wonder Show	(Note: Orson Welles (The Great McCoy, narration) succeeds Jack Smart, who begins his career in Hollywood films. Broadcast from New York.)		Yes			
September 13	Mutual	60 min.	The Wonder Show	(Note: Cast: Orson Welles (The Great McCoy, narration). Broadcast from Chicago.)		Yes			
September 19	CBS	30 min.	Columbia Workshop	"Hamlet", Part 1 (Note: Cast: Alexander Scourby, Edgerton Paul, George Gaul, Hiram Sherman, Orson Welles (host), Rosamond Pinchot, Sydney Smith, Irving Reis (director), Bernard Herrmann (music).)	Yes	Yes			Yes
September 20	Mutual	60 min.	The Wonder Show	(Note: Cast: Orson Welles (The Great McCoy, narration). Broadcast from Chicago.)		Yes			
September 27	Mutual	60 min.	The Wonder Show	(Note: Cast: Orson Welles (The Great McCoy, narration). Broadcast from Chicago.)		Yes			
October 4	Mutual	60 min.	The Wonder Show	(Note: Cast: Orson Welles (The Great McCoy, narration). Broadcast from the Chicago Civic Opera House.)		Yes			
October 11	Mutual	60 min.	The Wonder Show	(Note: Cast: Orson Welles (The Great McCoy, narration). Broadcast from Chicago.)		Yes			
November 14	CBS	30 min.	Columbia Workshop	"Hamlet", Part 2 (Note: Cast: Edgerton Paul, Edwin Jerome (narrator), George Duthie, Hiram Sherman, Irving Reis (writer), Joseph Cotten, Laura Hale, Miss Frank Hall, Orson Welles (host), Santos Ortega, Shirley Oliver, Sydney Smith, Virginia Welles, Whitford Kane, Irving Reis (director), Bernard Herrmann (music).)	Yes	Yes			Yes
1936	Red	30 min.	Peter Absolute	(Note: Weekly dramatic serial produced by the Radio Division of the Federal Theatre Project, broadcast Sunday afternoons February 23 – September 16. The Racine Journal-Times: "Life on the Erie Canal in the days when 'the canal' was young … The story of the canal through the adventures of a boy, who runs away from a county home to wild excitement with a gentleman gambler who is killed in a saloon fight, and then with a strolling actor, one Augustus Crabtree, tragedian". Cast: Arthur Anderson (Peter Absolute), Ray Collins (Augustus Crabtree), Julian Noa, Jeanette Nolan, Orson Welles (Rex Dakolar), David Howard (writer), Tom Hutchinson (director), Bill Meeder (organist).)		Yes			

== 1937 ==
Date	Network	Length	Series	Details	Surviving recording	Involvement			
Date	Network	Length	Series	Details	Surviving recording	Actor	Director	Producer	Writer
February 28	CBS	30 min.	Columbia Workshop	"Macbeth"		Yes			
April 11	CBS	30 min.	Columbia Workshop	"The Fall of the City" (Note: Cast: House Jameson (Voice of Studio Director), Orson Welles (Voice of Announcer), Adelaide Klein (Voice of Dead Woman), Carleton G. Young (Voice of 1st Messenger), Burgess Meredith (Voice of Orator), Dwight Weist (Voice of 2nd Messenger), others; Bernard Herrmann (music), Irving Reis (director).)	Yes	Yes			
July 23	Mutual	30 min.	Les Misérables	Chapter 1: "The Bishop" (Note: Adapted by Welles from the Victor Hugo novel. Cast: Orson Welles (Jean Valjean), Alan Devitt (Judge), Agnes Moorehead (Old Woman, Madame Magloire), Frank Readick (Bishop of Digne), others.)	Yes	Yes	Yes		Yes
July 30	Mutual	30 min.	Les Misérables	Chapter 2: "Javert" (Note: Cast: Hiram Sherman (Letter Deliverer, Factory Official, Idler who torments Fantine), Betty Garde (Favourite), Alice Frost (Fantine), Agnes Moorehead (Marguerite), Ray Collins (Traveling Dentist, Fauchelevent), Martin Gabel (Inspector Javert), Orson Welles (Jean Valjean [Monsieur Madeleine]).)	Yes	Yes	Yes		Yes
August 6	Mutual	30 min.	Les Misérables	Chapter 3: "The Trial" (Note: Cast: William Johnstone (Bishop of Digne, Prosecutor), Hiram Sherman (Man who announces Javert, Judicial Clerk), Orson Welles (Jean Valjean [Monsieur Madeleine], Champmathieu), Martin Gabel (Inspector Javert), Alice Frost (Fantine), Adelaide Klein (Nun), Ray Collins (Judge), others; Milton Katims, musical director.)	Yes	Yes	Yes		Yes
August 13	Mutual	30 min.	Les Misérables	Chapter 4: "Cosette" (Note: Cast: William Johnstone (Judge, Second Inn Customer), Orson Welles (Jean Valjean), Martin Gabel (Inspector Javert), Ray Collins (Thenardier), Agnes Moorehead (Madame Thenardier) Hiram Sherman (First Inn Customer), Estelle Levy (Cosette).)	Yes	Yes	Yes		Yes
August 15	CBS	30 min.	Columbia Workshop	"Escape", Part 1 (Note: Cast: Orson Welles (Captain Matt Denant), others.)		Yes			
August 20	Mutual	30 min.	Les Misérables	Chapter 5: "The Grave" (Note: Cast: William Johnstone (Police Officer, Marius Pontmercy), Everett Sloane (Police Lieutenant, Gyribier the Gravedigger), Ray Collins (Fauchelevent), Orson Welles (Jean Valjean), Estelle Levy (Cosette at age eight), Peggy Allen (Prioress), Hiram Sherman (Priest at the Grave), Virginia Welles (Older Cosette), Martin Gabel (Inspector Javert).)	Yes	Yes	Yes		Yes
August 22	CBS	30 min.	Columbia Workshop	"Escape", Part 2	Yes	Yes			
August 27	Mutual	30 min.	Les Misérables	Chapter 6: "The Barricade" (Note: Cast: Martin Gabel (Inspector Javert), Orson Welles (Jean Valjean), Virginia Welles (Cosette), Ray Collins (Police Officer, First Policeman), William Johnstone (Marius Pontmercy), Hiram Sherman (First Revolutionary, Second Policeman), others.)	Yes	Yes	Yes		Yes
August 30	CBS	30 min.	Columbia's Shakespeare	"Twelfth Night" (Note: Cast: Tallulah Bankhead, Cedric Hardwicke, Orson Welles, Mark Smith, Estelle Winwood, Robert Strauss, Helen Menken, Burford Hampden, John Griggs, Ray Collins, Niles Welch, Sydney Smith, Conway Tearle (narrator); music by Victor Bey.)	Yes	Yes			Yes
September 3	Mutual	30 min.	Les Misérables	Chapter 7: "The Final Episode" (Note: Cast: William Johnstone (Marius Pontmercy, Prosecutor), Orson Welles (Jean Valjean, Prisoner accused of being Jean Valjean), Ray Collins (Judge who sentences Valjean, Judge at Arras), Hiram Sherman ("Guilty!", Police Officer, Third Judge), Frank Readick (Bishop of Digne).)	Yes	Yes	Yes		Yes
September 26	Mutual	30 min.	The Shadow	"Death House Rescue" (Note: By Edward Hale Bierstadt. Cast: Orson Welles (Lamont Cranston/The Shadow), Agnes Moorehead (Margot Lane), William Johnstone, Jeanette Nolan, Ray Collins (triples), Paul Stewart (Paul Gordon), Elia Kazan, Everett Sloane (quadruples), Paul Huber (commercial spokesman), Frank Readick (opening and closing voice), Arthur Whiteside (announcer), Clark Andrews (producer); Martin Gabel, Bourne Ruthrauff (directors).)	Yes	Yes			
October 3	Mutual	30 min.	The Shadow	"The Red Macaw"		Yes			
October 10	Mutual	30 min.	The Shadow	"Danger in the Dark"		Yes			
October 17	Mutual	30 min.	The Shadow	"Murder by the Dead"	Yes	Yes			
October 24	Mutual	30 min.	The Shadow	"The Temple Bells of Neban" (Note: Cast: Orson Welles, Agnes Moorehead, Arthur Whiteside (announcer).)	Yes	Yes			
October 28	Blue	30 min.	The March of Time	Welles as Lord Chancellor for George VI	Yes	Yes			
October 31	Mutual	30 min.	The Shadow	"The Three Ghosts" (Note: Cast: Orson Welles, Agnes Moorehead, Arthur Whiteside (announcer).)	Yes	Yes			
November 7	Mutual	30 min.	The Shadow	"Death Rides the Skyway"		Yes			
November 14	Mutual	30 min.	The Shadow	"Terror Island"		Yes			
November 18	Blue	30 min.	The March of Time	Welles as Haile Selassie	Yes	Yes			
November 21	Mutual	30 min.	The Shadow	"The Ruby of Modoc"	Yes	Yes			
November 25	Blue	30 min.	The March of Time	Welles as amnesiac French soldier	Yes	Yes			
November 28	Mutual	30 min.	The Shadow	"Circle of Death" (Note: Cast: Orson Welles, Agnes Moorehead, Arthur Whiteside (announcer).)	Yes	Yes			
December 5	Mutual	30 min.	The Shadow	"The House of Greed"		Yes			
December 12	Mutual	30 min.	The Shadow	"The Death Triangle" (Note: Cast: Orson Welles, Agnes Moorehead, Ken Roberts (announcer).)	Yes	Yes			
December 19	Mutual	30 min.	The Shadow	"Cold Death"		Yes			
December 26	Mutual	30 min.	The Shadow	"The Voice of Death"	Yes	Yes			
1937	CBS	30 min.	Living Dramas of the Bible	(Note: Produced by the Radio Division of the Federal Theatre Project)		Yes			
1937	Blue	30 min.	Roses and Drums	(Note: Historical drama series produced by the Radio Division of the Federal Theatre Project)		Yes			
1937	Mutual		Parted on Her Bridal Tour	(Note: Dramatization of Miss Middleton's Lover by Laura Jean Libbey, produced by the Radio Division of the Federal Theatre Project)		Yes			

== 1938 ==
Date	Network	Length	Series	Details	Surviving recording	Involvement			
Date	Network	Length	Series	Details	Surviving recording	Actor	Director	Producer	Writer
January 2	Mutual	30 min.	The Shadow	"The Goddess of Death"		Yes			
January 2	Blue	60 min.	The Magic Key	(Note: Cast: Orson Welles and Martin Gabel (performing the quarrel scene from Julius Caesar), Kirsten Flagstad with Edwin McArthur (piano), Milton Cross (host), NBC Symphony Orchestra, Frank Black (conductor), Ben Grauer (announcer).)	Yes	Yes			
January 6	Blue	30 min.	The March of Time	Welles as Paul Muni, Fredric March, Spencer Tracy and Cecil B. DeMille	Yes	Yes			
January 9	Mutual	30 min.	The Shadow	"The League of Terror" (Note: Cast: Orson Welles, Agnes Moorehead.)	Yes	Yes			
January 13	Blue	30 min.	The March of Time		Yes	Yes			
January 16	Mutual	30 min.	The Shadow	"Sabotage" (Note: Cast: Orson Welles, Agnes Moorehead.)	Yes	Yes			
January 20	Blue	30 min.	The March of Time		Yes	Yes			
January 23	Mutual	30 min.	The Shadow	"The Society of the Living Dead" (Note: Cast: Orson Welles, Agnes Moorehead, Ken Roberts (announcer).)	Yes	Yes			
January 27	Blue	30 min.	The March of Time		Yes	Yes			
January 30	Mutual	30 min.	The Shadow	"The Poison Death" (Note: Cast: Orson Welles, Agnes Moorehead, Ken Roberts (announcer).)	Yes	Yes			
February 3	Blue	30 min.	The March of Time		Yes	Yes			
February 6	Mutual	30 min.	The Shadow	"The Phantom Voice" (Note: Cast: Orson Welles, Agnes Moorehead, Ken Roberts (announcer).)	Yes	Yes			
February 10	Blue	30 min.	The March of Time		Yes	Yes			
February 13	Mutual	30 min.	The Shadow	"The House of Horror" (Note: Cast: Orson Welles, Agnes Moorehead, Ken Roberts (announcer).)	Yes	Yes			
February 20	Mutual	30 min.	The Shadow	"Hounds in the Hills" (Note: Cast: Orson Welles, Agnes Moorehead, Everett Sloane, Ken Roberts (announcer).)	Yes	Yes			
February 27	Mutual	30 min.	The Shadow	"The Plot Murder" (Note: Cast: Orson Welles, Agnes Moorehead, Ken Roberts (announcer).)	Yes	Yes			
March 3	Blue	30 min.	The March of Time	Welles as Austrian government agent	Yes	Yes			
March 6	Mutual	30 min.	The Shadow	"The Bride of Death" (Note: Cast: Orson Welles, Agnes Moorehead, Ray Collins, Margot Stevenson, Jeanette Nolan, Arthur Vinton, Everett Sloane, Paul Stewart, Thomas Coffin Cook, Ken Roberts (announcer).)	Yes	Yes			
March 10	Blue	30 min.	The March of Time	Welles as Fiorello LaGuardia	Yes	Yes			
March 13	Mutual	30 min.	The Shadow	"The Silent Avenger" (Note: Cast: Orson Welles, Agnes Moorehead, Ken Roberts (announcer).)	Yes	Yes			
March 17	Blue	30 min.	The March of Time	Welles as Sigmund Freud	Yes	Yes			
March 20	Mutual	30 min.	The Shadow	"The White Legion" (Note: Cast: Orson Welles, Agnes Moorehead, Carl Frank (William Devens), Ned Wever (Alton Parker), Peggy Allenby (Helen Parker), Alan Devitt (Hartney Clays), Dwight Weist (Commissioner Weston, Detective Dixon), Kenneth Delmar (Jason), Paul Stewart (Red Collins), Paul Huber (Lawrence), Everett Sloane (Defense Attorney), Bennett Kilpack (Judge Rusko), Ken Roberts (announcer), John Barclay. After the closing commercial the announcer credits Orson Welles of the Mercury Theatre as performing the role of The Shadow; Welles speaks briefly before the live studio audience and thanks listeners; Agnes Moorehead suggests listeners phone sponsor Blue Coal and say how much they have enjoyed the series.)	Yes	Yes			
March 24	Blue	30 min.	The March of Time	Welles as Leopold Stokowski	Yes	Yes			
March 27	Synd	30 min.	The Shadow	"The Hypnotized Audience" (Note: Cast: Orson Welles, Margot Stevenson (Margot Lane), Ken Roberts (announcer). Summer series transcribed for syndicated broadcast.)	Yes	Yes			
April 3	Synd	30 min.	The Shadow	"Death from the Deep" (Note: Cast: Orson Welles, Margot Stevenson, Ken Roberts (announcer).)	Yes	Yes			
April 10	Synd	30 min.	The Shadow	"The Firebug" (Note: Cast: Orson Welles, Margot Stevenson, Ken Roberts (announcer).)	Yes	Yes			
April 17	Synd	30 min.	The Shadow	"The Blind Beggar Dies" (Note: Cast: Orson Welles, Margot Stevenson, Ken Roberts (announcer).)	Yes	Yes			
April 24	Synd	30 min.	The Shadow	"Power of the Mind" (Note: Cast: Orson Welles, Margot Stevenson, Ken Roberts (announcer).)	Yes	Yes			
May 1	Synd	30 min.	The Shadow	"The White God" (Note: Cast: Orson Welles, Margot Stevenson, Ken Roberts (announcer), Rosa Rio (organ), Frank Readick (opening and closing laughter), William Johnstone (triples), Dwight Weist, Arthur Vinton (doubles), Alan Devitt (doubles).)	Yes	Yes			
May 8	Synd	30 min.	The Shadow	"Aboard the Steamship Amazon" (Note: Cast: Orson Welles, Margot Stevenson, Ken Roberts (announcer).)	Yes	Yes			
May 15	Synd	30 min.	The Shadow	"Murders in Wax" (Note: Cast: Orson Welles, Margot Stevenson, Ken Roberts (announcer).)	Yes	Yes			
May 22	Synd	30 min.	The Shadow	"The Message from the Hills" (Note: Cast: Orson Welles, Margot Stevenson (Margo Lane), Ken Roberts (announcer).)	Yes	Yes			
May 29	Synd	30 min.	The Shadow	"The Creeper" (Note: Cast: Orson Welles, Margot Stevenson, Ken Roberts (announcer).)	Yes	Yes			
June 5	Synd	30 min.	The Shadow	"The Tenor with the Broken Voice" (Note: Cast: Orson Welles, Margot Stevenson, Ken Roberts (announcer, performer playing a tenor), John McGovern, Rosa Rio (organist), William Johnstone (triples), Ray Collins, Paul Stewart (doubles), Jeanette Nolan, Kenny Delmar (doubles), Dwight Weist (announcer, performer).)	Yes	Yes			
June 12	Synd	30 min.	The Shadow	"Murder On Approval" (Note: Cast: Orson Welles, Margot Stevenson, Ken Roberts (announcer).)	Yes	Yes			
June 19	Synd	30 min.	The Shadow	"The Tomb of Terror" (Note: Cast: Orson Welles, Margot Stevenson, Ken Roberts (announcer), Edwin Jerome (doubles), Arthur Vinton, Alan Devitt (triples), Paul Stewart (doubles), Kenny Delmar (doubles), Rosa Rio (organist).)	Yes	Yes			
June 26	Synd	30 min.	The Shadow	"The Old People" (Note: Cast: Orson Welles, Margot Stevenson, Dwight Weist, Everett Sloane, Ken Roberts (announcer).)	Yes	Yes			
July 3	Synd	30 min.	The Shadow	"The Voice of the Trumpet" (Note: Cast: Orson Welles, Margot Stevenson (Margo Lane), Dwight Weist, Ken Roberts (announcer).)	Yes	Yes			
July 10	Synd	30 min.	The Shadow	"He Died at Twelve" (Note: Cast: Orson Welles, Margot Stevenson, Alan Reed, Alan Devitt (doubles, announcer), Sheldon Reynolds, Ray Collins, Ken Roberts (announcer).)	Yes	Yes			
July 11	CBS	60 min.	First Person Singular	"Dracula" (Note: Adapted from the novel by Bram Stoker. Cast: Orson Welles (Dr. John Seward, Count Dracula), Elizabeth Fuller (Lucy Westenra). George Coulouris (Jonathan Harker), Agnes Moorehead (Mina Harker), Martin Gabel (Dr. Van Helsing), Ray Collins (Russian Captain), Karl Swenson (Mate). Premier episode of the series that after nine episodes became known as The Mercury Theatre on the Air.)	Yes	Yes	Yes	Yes	Yes
July 17	Synd	30 min.	The Shadow	"The Reincarnation of Michael" (Note: Cast: Orson Welles, Margot Stevenson, Ken Roberts (announcer).)	Yes	Yes			
July 18	CBS	60 min.	First Person Singular	"Treasure Island" (Note: Adapted from the novel by Robert Louis Stevenson. Cast: Orson Welles (adult Jim Hawkins, Long John Silver), Arthur Anderson (Jim Hawkins), George Coulouris (Captain Smollett), Ray Collins (Ben Gunn), Agnes Moorehead (Mrs. Hawkins), Eustace Wyatt (Squire Trelawney), Alfred Shirley (Blind Pew); with William Alland, Stephen Fox, Richard Wilson.)	Yes	Yes	Yes	Yes	Yes
July 24	Synd	30 min.	The Shadow	"The Mark of the Bat" (Note: Cast: Orson Welles, Margot Stevenson, Alan Devitt, Kenny Delmar, Ken Roberts (announcer).)	Yes	Yes			
July 25	CBS	60 min.	First Person Singular	"A Tale of Two Cities" (Note: Adapted from the novel by Charles Dickens. Cast: Orson Welles (Dr. Alexandre Manette, Sydney Carton), Mary Taylor (Lucie Manette), Eustace Wyatt (Clerk), Edgar Barrier (Charles Darnay), Maratin Gabel (Mr. Jarvis Lorry), Frank Readick (Ernest Defarge), Betty Gard (Madame Defarge), Erskine Sanford (the President), Ray Collins (Prosecutor).)	Yes	Yes	Yes	Yes	Yes
July 31	Synd	30 min.	The Shadow	"Revenge on the Shadow" (Note: Cast: Orson Welles, Margot Stevenson, Ray Collins, Paul Stewart, Ken Roberts (announcer).)	Yes	Yes			
August 1	CBS	60 min.	First Person Singular	"The Thirty-Nine Steps" (Note: Adapted from the novel by John Buchan. Cast: Orson Welles (Richard Hannay, Marmaduke Jopley), others.)	Yes	Yes	Yes	Yes	Yes
August 7	Synd	30 min.	The Shadow	"The Mine Hunters" (Note: Cast: Orson Welles, Margot Stevenson, Ken Roberts (announcer).)	Yes	Yes			
August 8	CBS	60 min.	First Person Singular	"I'm a Fool", "The Open Window", "My Little Boy" (Note: Adaptations of three short stories. Orson Welles, Edgar Barrier and William Alland perform "I'm a Fool" by Sherwood Anderson. Ray Collins, Brenda Forbes and Virginia Welles (as Anna Stafford) perform "The Open Window" by Saki. Betty Garde, Kingsley Colton, Estelle Levy and Orson Welles perform "My Little Boy" by Carl Ewald.)	Yes	Yes	Yes	Yes	Yes
August 14	Synd	30 min.	The Shadow	"The Hospital Murders" (Note: Cast: Orson Welles, Margot Stevenson, Ken Roberts (announcer), Alan Devitt, Arthur Vinton, Dwight Weist.)	Yes	Yes			
August 15	CBS	60 min.	First Person Singular	"Abraham Lincoln" (Note: Adapted from the play by John Drinkwater, supplemented by excerpts from Lincoln's speeches and letters. Cast: Orson Welles (Abraham Lincoln), Ray Collins (Grant), Edward Jerome (General Lee) George Coulouris (Hook), Joseph Cotten (Seward), Carl Frank (Scott), Karl Swenson (Hay), William Alland (Dennis) and Agnes Moorehead (Mrs. Lincoln).)	Yes	Yes	Yes	Yes	Yes
August 21	Synd	30 min.	The Shadow	"The Caverns of Death" (Note: Cast: Orson Welles, Margot Stevenson, Ken Roberts (announcer).)	Yes	Yes			
August 22	CBS	60 min.	First Person Singular	"The Affairs of Anatol" (Note: Adapted from the play by Arthur Schnitzler. Cast: Orson Welles, Alice Frost, Arlene Francis, Helen Lewis, Ray Collins.)	Yes	Yes	Yes	Yes	Yes
August 28	Synd	30 min.	The Shadow	"Death Under the Chapel" (Note: Cast: Orson Welles, Margot Stevenson, Ken Roberts (announcer).)	Yes	Yes			
August 29	CBS	60 min.	First Person Singular	"The Count of Monte Cristo" (Note: Adapted from the novel by Alexandre Dumas. Cast: Orson Welles (Edmond Dantès), Ray Collins (Abbé Faria), George Coulouris (Monsieur Morrel), Edgar Barrier (de Villefort), Eustace Wyatt (Caderousse), Paul Stewart (Paul Dantés) Sidney Smith (Mondego), Richard Wilson (the Officer), Virginia Welles, as Anna Stafford (Mercédès), William Alland (Merchant).)	Yes	Yes	Yes	Yes	Yes
September 4	Synd	30 min.	The Shadow	"Black Buddha" (Note: Cast: Orson Welles, Margot Stevenson, Ken Roberts (announcer), Alan Reed, Alan Devitt.)	Yes	Yes			
September 5	CBS	60 min.	First Person Singular	"The Man Who Was Thursday" (Note: Adapted from the novel by G. K. Chesterton. Cast: Orson Welles (Gabriel Syme), Eustace Wyatt (President Sunday), Ray Collins (the Professor), George Coulouis (Mr. Lucian Gregory), Edgar Barrier (the Marquis), Paul Stewart (Gogol), Joseph Cotten (Dr. Bull), Erskine Sanford (Secretary), Aland Devitt (Witherspoon), Virginia Welles, as Anna Stafford (Rosamond).)	Yes	Yes	Yes	Yes	Yes
September 11	CBS	60 min.	The Mercury Theatre on the Air	"Julius Caesar" (Note: The series First Person Singular continues under a new name, beginning with the Mercury Theatre's stage triumph. Cast: H. V. Kaltenborn (Commentator), Orson Welles (Brutus), Martin Gabel (Cassius), George Coulouris (Antony), Joseph Holland (Caesar); music by Marc Blitzstein.)	Yes	Yes	Yes	Yes	Yes
September 11	Synd	30 min.	The Shadow	"The Witch Drums of Salem" (Note: Adaptation of the play by William Shakespeare. Cast: Orson Welles, Margot Stevenson, Ken Roberts (announcer), Paul Stewart, Juano Hernández.)	Yes	Yes			
September 18	CBS	60 min.	The Mercury Theatre on the Air	"Jane Eyre" (Note: Adapted from the novel by Charlotte Brontë. Music by Bernard Herrmann. Welles used the disc to prepare the 1943 film in which he starred, and the acetate original was irreparably damaged.)		Yes	Yes	Yes	Yes
September 18	Synd	30 min.	The Shadow	"Professor X" (Note: Cast: Orson Welles (last performance as The Shadow), Margot Stevenson, Ken Roberts (announcer).)	Yes	Yes			
September 25	CBS	60 min.	The Mercury Theatre on the Air	"Sherlock Holmes" (Note: Adapted from the play by William Gillette. Cast: Orson Welles (Sherlock Holmes), Ray Collins (Dr. Watson), Mary Taylor (Alice Faulkner), Brenda Forbes (Madge Larrabee), Edgar Barrier (James Larrabee), Morgan Farley (Inspector Forman), Richard Wilson (Jim Craigin), Eustace Wyatt (Professor Moriarty).)	Yes	Yes	Yes	Yes	Yes
October 2	CBS	60 min.	The Mercury Theatre on the Air	"Oliver Twist" (Note: Adapted from the novel by Charles Dickens. Cast: Orson Welles (Oliver Twist, Fagin), others.)		Yes	Yes	Yes	Yes
October 9	CBS	60 min.	The Mercury Theatre on the Air	"Hell on Ice" (Note: Adapted from the book by Edward Ellsberg. Cast: Orson Welles, Al Swenson, Bud Collyer, Dan Seymour (announcer), Frank Readick, Howard Smith, Joseph Cotten, Ray Collins, Thelma Schnee, William Alland, Bernard Herrmann (composer, conductor), Davidson Taylor (production supervisor).)	Yes	Yes	Yes	Yes	Yes
October 16	CBS	60 min.	The Mercury Theatre on the Air	"Seventeen" (Note: Adaptation of the novel by Booth Tarkington. Cast: Orson Welles (William Sylvanus Baxter), Betty Garde (Mrs. Baxter), Ray Collins (Mr. Parcher), Mary Wickes (Mrs. Parcher), Joseph Cotten (Genesis), Ruth Ford (Lola Pratt, the Baby Talk Girl), Marilyn Erskine (Jane), Elliott Reid (Cousin George), Pattee Chapmen (Rannie), Morgan Farley (Joe Bullitt).)	Yes	Yes	Yes	Yes	Yes
October 23	CBS	60 min.	The Mercury Theatre on the Air	"Around the World in Eighty Days" (Note: Adapted from the novel by Jules Verne. Cast: Orson Welles (Phineas Fogg), Ray Collins (Mr. Fix), Edgar Barrier (Passepartout), Eustace Wyatt (Ralph), Frank Readick (Stuart), Arlene Francis (Princess Aouda), Stefan Schnabel (Parsee), Al Swenson (the Captain), William Alland (the Officer).)	Yes	Yes	Yes	Yes	Yes
October 30	CBS	60 min.	The Mercury Theatre on the Air	"The War of the Worlds" (Note: Adaptation of the novel by H. G. Wells. Cast: Orson Welles (host, Professor Richard Pierson), Dan Seymour (announcer), Paul Stewart (associate producer, adaptor, performer: Studio announcer, Third Studio Announcer), Frank Readick (Reporter Carl Phillips, Radio operator 2X2L), Kenny Delmar (Policeman at farm, Captain Lansing, Secretary of the Interior, Bayonne radio operator), Ray Collins (Farmer Wilmuth, Harry McDonald the radio VP, Rooftop radio announcer), Carl Frank (Second studio announcer, Fascist stranger), Richard Wilson (Brig. General Montgomery Smith, Officer 22nd Field Artillery, Langham Field), William Alland (Meridian room announcer, Field artillery gunner), Stefan Schnabel (Field artillery observer), William Herz (Newark radio operator, Radio operator 8X3R), Howard Smith (Bomber Lt. Voght), Bernard Herrmann (composer, conductor), John Houseman (producer, adaptor, script editor), Howard E. Koch (adaptor), Davidson Taylor (production supervisor), Ora Nichols (sound effects), Ray Kremer (sound effects), Jim Rogan (sound effects), John Dietz (sound engineer)/)	Yes	Yes	Yes	Yes	Yes
November 6	CBS	60 min.	The Mercury Theatre on the Air	"Heart of Darkness", "Life With Father" (Note: Adaptation of the novella Heart of Darkness by Joseph Conrad, with the following cast: Orson Welles (Author, Ernest Kurtz), Ray Collins (Marlow), Alfred Shirley (Accountant), George Coulouris (Assistant Manager), Edgar Barrier (Second Manager), William Alland (Agent), Virginia Welles, as Anna Stafford (Kurtz's Intended Bride), Frank Readick (Tchiatosov). Adaptation of the play Life With Father by Clarence Day, with the following cast: Orson Welles (Father), Mildred Natwick (Mother), Mary Wickes (Employment Office Manager), Alice Frost (Margaret), Arthur Anderson (young Clarence Day).)	Yes	Yes	Yes	Yes	Yes
November 13	CBS	30 min.	The Silver Theatre	"Stars in Their Courses", Part 1 (Note: Adapted from a story by I. A. R. Wylie. Cast: Orson Welles (host), Helen Hayes, Carleton Young, Morgan Farley.)	Yes	Yes			
November 13	CBS	60 min.	The Mercury Theatre on the Air	"A Passenger to Bali" (Note: Adapted for radio by Ellis St. Joseph, from his own short novel. Cast: Orson Welles (Reverend Dr. Ralph Walkes), George Coulouris (Capt. English), Frank Readick (Mr. Stagg), Eustace Wyatt (Mr. Wrangle), Ray Collins (Van Matsys), Alfred Shirley (Mr. Chisholm).)	Yes	Yes	Yes	Yes	Yes
November 20	CBS	30 min.	The Silver Theatre	"Stars in Their Courses", Part 2 (Note: Adapted from a story by I. A. R. Wylie. Cast: Orson Welles (host), Helen Hayes, Carleton Young, Morgan Farley.)	Yes	Yes			
November 20	CBS	60 min.	The Mercury Theatre on the Air	"The Pickwick Papers" (Note: Adapted from the novel by Charles Dickens. Cast: Orson Welles (Sergeant Buzzfuzz, Mr. Jingle), Ray Collins (Samuel Pickwick), Alfred Shirley (Augustus Snodgrass), Frank Readick, Elliott Reid, Edgar Barrier, Eustace Wyatt, Brenda Forbes, others.)	Yes	Yes	Yes	Yes	Yes
November 27	CBS	60 min.	The Mercury Theatre on the Air	"Clarence" (Note: Adapted from the novel by Booth Tarkington. Cast: Orson Welles (Clarence), others.)		Yes	Yes	Yes	Yes
December 4	CBS	60 min.	The Mercury Theatre on the Air	"The Bridge of San Luis Rey" (Note: Adapted from the novel by Thornton Wilder.)		Yes	Yes	Yes	Yes
December 9	CBS	60 min.	The Campbell Playhouse	"Rebecca" (Note: Adapted from the novel by Daphne du Maurier, its first adaptation for any medium. Cast: Orson Welles (Max de Winter), Margaret Sullavan (Mrs. de Winter), Mildred Natwick (Mrs. Danvers), Ray Collins (Frank Crawley), George Coulouris (Captain Searle), Frank Readick (the Idiot), Alfred Shirley (Frith), Eustace Wyatt (Coroner), Agnes Moorehead (Mrs. Van Hopper). Followed by an interview with Daphne du Maurier, speaking from London. Herrmann's score is the basis of his score for the 1943 film Jane Eyre. Sponsored continuation of The Mercury Theatre on the Air.)	Yes	Yes	Yes	Yes	Yes
December 16	CBS	60 min.	The Campbell Playhouse	"Call It a Day" (Note: Adapted from the play by Dodie Smith. Cast: Orson Welles (Roger Hilton), Beatrice Lillie (Dorothy Hilton), Jane Wyatt (Catherine Hilton).)	Yes	Yes	Yes	Yes	Yes
December 23	CBS	60 min.	The Campbell Playhouse	"A Christmas Carol" (Note: Adapted from the story by Charles Dickens. Cast: Orson Welles (Ebenezer Scrooge), Hiram Sherman (Bob Cratchit), Brenda Forbes (Mrs. Cratchit), Arthur Anderson (Ghost of Christmas Past), Eustace Wyatt (Ghost of Christmas Present), Frank Readick (Ghost of Christmas Yet to Come), Alfred Shirley (Marley's Ghost), Joseph Cotten (Scrooge's nephew Fred), Virginia Welles, as Anna Stafford (Belle), Kingsley Colton (Tiny Tim), George Spelldon (Mr. Fezziwig), Alice Frost (Charwoman), Ernest Chappell (Announcer).)	Yes	Yes	Yes	Yes	Yes
December 30	CBS	60 min.	The Campbell Playhouse	"A Farewell to Arms" (Note: Adapted from the novel by Ernest Hemingway. Cast: Orson Welles (Frederick Henry), Katharine Hepburn (Catherine).)	Yes	Yes	Yes	Yes	Yes

== 1939 ==
Date	Network	Length	Series	Details	Surviving recording	Involvement			
Date	Network	Length	Series	Details	Surviving recording	Actor	Director	Producer	Writer
January 6	CBS	60 min.	The Campbell Playhouse	"Counsellor-at-Law" (Note: Adapted from the play by Elmer Rice. Cast: Orson Welles (George Simon), Gertrude Berg (Mrs. Simon), Aline MacMahon (Regina Gordon), Ray Collins, Arlene Francis, Joseph Cotten, Erskine Sloane, Frank Readick, Edgar Barrier, Stephen Roberts, William Alland, others. Remarks by legal advisor Sam Leibowitz.)	Yes	Yes	Yes	Yes	Yes
January 13	CBS	60 min.	The Campbell Playhouse	"Mutiny on the Bounty" (Note: Adapted from the novel by Charles Nordhoff and James Norman Hall. Cast: Orson Welles (Captain Bligh), Carl Frank (Roger Byam), Joseph Cotten (Fletcher Christian), Ray Collins (Thomas Birkitt), Frank Readick (John Fryer), Myron McCormick (James Morrison), Edgar Barrier (William Purcell), Richard Wilson (Matthew Thompson), William Alland (Mr. Samuel), Memo Holt (Tehani). Welles introduces Dorothy Hall, an amateur radio operator from Queens, Long Island, New York, who helped the 214 residents of Pitcairn Island in July 1938 after false reports of a typhoid epidemic closed the harbor and left them without food and medical supplies.)	Yes	Yes	Yes	Yes	Yes
January 20	CBS	60 min.	The Campbell Playhouse	"The Chicken Wagon Family" (Note: Adapted from the novel by Barry Benefield. Cast: Orson Welles (Frank Fippany), Burgess Meredith, Ray Collins (Hibbard), Frank Readick, Joseph Cotten, Agnes Moorehead, Everett Sloane, William Alland, Richard Wilson, others.)	Yes	Yes	Yes	Yes	Yes
January 22	Mutual; CBS; NBC	60 min.	The March of Dimes	(Note: Kickoff of the second annual fundraising drive for the National Foundation for Infantile Paralysis in the week preceding President Franklin D. Roosevelt's birthday. Broadcast coast-to-coast from Hollywood and New York. Cast: Eddie Cantor (host), Goodman Ace, Fred Allen, Amos and Andy, Jack Benny, Major Edward Bowes, Burns and Allen, Bing Crosby, Cecil B. DeMille, Deanna Durbin, Nelson Eddy, Jimmie Fidler, Jascha Haifetz, George Jessel, H. V. Kaltenborn, Andre Kostelanetz, Jeanette MacDonald, Joe Penner, Tyrone Power, Robert Ripley, Edward G. Robinson, Lanny Ross, Gladys Swarthout, Rudy Vallee, Orson Welles, many others.)		Yes			
January 27	CBS	60 min.	The Campbell Playhouse	"I Lost My Girlish Laughter" (Note: Adapted from the novel by Jane Allen, pseudonym of Silvia Schulman, former secretary to David O. Selznick, and her friend Jane Shore. Selznick made strenuous efforts to prevent this broadcast. Cast: Orson Welles (Sidney Brandt), George S. Kaufman (John Tussler), Ilka Chase (Madge Lawrence), Tamara Geva (Sarya Tarn), Edgar Barrier (Bruce Anders), Everett Sloane (Roy), Myron McCormick (Leland Hayward), Ray Collins (Faye), Frank Readick (Palmer), Agnes Moorehead (Frances Smith), Joseph Cotten (Riley), William Alland (Assistant Director). The cast interviews Jane Allen.)	Yes	Yes	Yes	Yes	Yes
February 3	CBS	60 min.	The Campbell Playhouse	"Arrowsmith" (Note: Adapted from the novel by Sinclair Lewis. Cast: Orson Welles (Martin Arrowsmith), Helen Hayes (Leora Arrowsmith), Ray Collins (Professor Gottlieb), Frank Readick (Sondelius), Al Swenson (Henry Novak), Effie Palmer (Mrs. Tozer), Everett Sloane (Mr. Tozer), Carl Frank (Dr. Stoups), Frank Readick, Paul Stewart, others.)	Yes	Yes	Yes	Yes	Yes
February 10	CBS	60 min.	The Campbell Playhouse	"The Green Goddess" (Note: Adapted from the play by William Archer. Cast: Orson Welles (the Rajah), Madeleine Carroll (Lucilla Crespin), Robert Speaight (Major Crespin), Ray Collins (Dr. Traherne), Everett Sloane, Alfred Shirley, Eustace Wyatt, Edgar Barrier, others.)	Yes	Yes	Yes	Yes	Yes
February 17	CBS	60 min.	The Campbell Playhouse	"Burlesque" (Note: Adapted from the play by Arthur Hopkins and George Manker Watters. Cast: Orson Welles (Skid), Sam Levene (Lefty), Alice Frost, Arlene Francis, Ray Collins, Everett Sloane, Gus Schilling, others. Arthur Hopkins is interviewed.)	Yes	Yes	Yes	Yes	Yes
February 24	CBS	60 min.	The Campbell Playhouse	"State Fair" (Note: Adapted from the novel by Philip Duffield Stong. Cast: Burgess Meredith, Orson Welles (Pat), Ray Collins, Everett Sloane, Effie Palmer, Alice Frost, Howard Teichmann, others. Interview with Philip Stong and comics Amos 'n' Andy (Freeman Gosden and Charles Correll).)	Yes	Yes	Yes	Yes	Yes
March 2	CBS	60 min.	The Campbell Playhouse	"Royal Regiment" (Note: Adapted from the novel by Gilbert Frankau. Cast: Orson Welles (Tom Rockingham), Mary Astor (Camilla Wethered), Ray Collins, Alfred Shirley, Everett Sloane, Eustace Wyatt, Howard Teichmann, others. Gilbert Frankau is interviewed.)	Yes	Yes	Yes	Yes	Yes
March 10	CBS	60 min.	The Campbell Playhouse	"The Glass Key" (Note: Adapted from the novel by Dashiell Hammett. Cast: Orson Welles (Paul Madvig), Paul Stewart (Ned Beaumont), Ray Collins (Shad O'Rory) Myron McCormick (Senator Henry), Effie Palmer (Mrs. Madvig), Elspeth Eric (Opal), Elizabeth Morgan (Telephone Operator), Everett Sloane (Farr), Howard Smith (Jeff), Laura Baxter (Janet Henry), Edgar Barrier (Rusty). Interview with Warden Lewis E. Lawes of Sing Sing.)	Yes	Yes	Yes	Yes	Yes
March 17	CBS	60 min.	The Campbell Playhouse	"Beau Geste" (Note: Adapted from the novel by P. C. Wren. Cast: Orson Welles (Beau Geste), Laurence Olivier (John Geste), Noah Beery (Sergeant Lajaune), Naomi Campbell (Isobel), Isabel Elson (Lady Brandon), Ray Collins, Eustace Wyatt, Howard Teichmann, Stefan Schnabel, others. Interview with J. Alphonse de Redenet, French Legionnaire.)	Yes	Yes	Yes	Yes	Yes
March 24	CBS	60 min.	The Campbell Playhouse	"Twentieth Century" (Note: Adapted from the play by Charles Bruce Millholland. Cast: Orson Welles (Oscar Jaffe), Elissa Landi (Lily Garland), Sam Levene (Owen O'Malley), Ray Collins (Oliver Webb), Gus Schilling (Max Jacobs), Howard Teichmann (Train Dispatcher), Edgar Kent (Clark), Everett Sloane and Teddy Bergman (the Two Players). Interview with Broadway press agent Richard Maney.)	Yes	Yes	Yes	Yes	Yes
March 31	CBS	60 min.	The Campbell Playhouse	"Show Boat" (Note: Adapted from the novel by Edna Ferber. Cast: Orson Welles (Captain Andy Hawks), Edna Ferber (Parthy Ann Hawks), Margaret Sullavan (Magnolia), Helen Morgan (Julie), William Johnstone (Gaylord Ravenal), Ray Collins (Windy), Grace Cotten (Kim), Everett Sloane (Schultzy), William Johnstone, Carl Frank, others. Interview with Edna Ferber.)	Yes	Yes	Yes	Yes	Yes
April 7	CBS	60 min.	The Campbell Playhouse	"Les Misérables" (Note: Adapted from the novel by Victor Hugo. Cast: Orson Welles (Javert), Walter Huston (Jean Valjean), Ray Collins, Everett Sloane, Edgar Barrier, Alice Frost, William Alland, Richard Wilson, others.)	Yes	Yes	Yes	Yes	Yes
April 14	CBS	60 min.	The Campbell Playhouse	"The Patriot" (Note: Adapted from the novel by Pearl S. Buck. Cast: Orson Welles (I-wan), Anna May Wong (Peony), Ray Collins, Elliott Reid, Everett Sloane, Edgar Barrier, Howard Teichmann, others. Interview with Pearl S. Buck.)	Yes	Yes	Yes	Yes	Yes
April 21	CBS	60 min.	The Campbell Playhouse	"Private Lives" (Note: Adapted from the play by Noël Coward. Cast: Orson Welles (Elyot Chase), Gertrude Lawrence (Amanda Prynne), Naomi Campbell (Sibyl Chase), Robert Speaight (Victor Prynne), Edgar Barrier (Hotel Manager). Interview with Gertrude Lawrence.)	Yes	Yes	Yes	Yes	Yes
April 28	CBS	60 min.	The Campbell Playhouse	"Black Daniel" (Note: A retelling of Stephen Vincent Benét's The Devil and Daniel Webster, by Honoré Morrow. Cast: Orson Welles (Daniel Webster), Joan Bennett (Carolyn LeRoy), Ray Collins, Everett Sloane, William Alland, others.)	Yes	Yes	Yes	Yes	Yes
May 5	CBS	60 min.	The Campbell Playhouse	"Wickford Point" (Note: Adapted from the novel by John P. Marquand. Cast: Orson Welles (Jim Calder), Linda Watkins (Bella), Helen Craig (Pat), Agnes Moorehead (Aunt Sarah, Clothilde), Everett Sloane (Syd), Paul Stewart (Berg), Carl Frank (Joe Stowe), Ray Collins (Grandfather). John P. Marquand is interviewed.)	Yes	Yes	Yes	Yes	Yes
May 12	CBS	60 min.	The Campbell Playhouse	"Our Town" (Note: Adapted from the play by Thornton Wilder. Cast: Orson Welles (Stage Manager), Patricia Newton, Agnes Moorehead, Effie Palmer, John Craven, Ray Collins, Everett Sloane, Parker Fennelly, Elliott Reid, others.)	Yes	Yes	Yes	Yes	Yes
May 19	CBS	60 min.	The Campbell Playhouse	"The Bad Man" (Note: Adapted from the play by Porter Emerson Browne. Cast: Orson Welles (Pancho Lopez), Ida Lupino (Lucia Pell), Frank Readick (Gilbert Phebbs), Ray Collins (Uncle Phipps), William Alland (Morgan Pell), Diana Stevens (Dot), Everett Sloane (Louie), Edward Jerome (Pedro). Ida Lupino is interviewed.)	Yes	Yes	Yes	Yes	Yes
May 26	CBS	60 min.	The Campbell Playhouse	"American Cavalcade" (Note: "The Things We Have", about the great dream of American liberty, by Orson Welles. Cast: Orson Welles (James Scott, Professor Shurtz, O'Shaughnessy, The Limey, John Brown), Cornelia Otis Skinner (Mary Scott, Frau Shurtz, Lady Townsend, Polish woman, Susan B. Anthony); with Ray Collins, Frank Readick, Everett Sloane, Agnes Moorehead, Howard Smith, Kenneth Delmar, Kingsley Colton, William Harrigan. Cornelia Otis Skinner is interviewed.)	Yes	Yes	Yes	Yes	Yes
June 2	CBS	60 min.	The Campbell Playhouse	"Victoria Regina" (Note: Adapted from the play by Laurence Housman. Cast: Orson Welles (Prince Albert), Helen Hayes (Queen Victoria); with Eustace Wyatt, Ray Collins, Brenda Forbes, Agnes Moorehead, Alfred Shirley, Virginia Welles (as Anna Stafford). Interview with Helen Hayes.)	Yes	Yes	Yes	Yes	Yes
June 4	CBS	30 min.	Knickerbocker Playhouse	"Business Before Pleasure" (Note: Cast: Orson Welles (Theodore Kennedy, replacing John Barrymore), Elliott Lewis (host).)		Yes			
July 1	Mutual	60 min.	The American Forum of the Air	(Note: Public affairs panel discussion on the fate of the Federal Theatre Project, featuring Sen. Lewis B. Schwellenbach, Sen. Arthur Capper, four members of the U.S. House of Representatives, and Orson Welles. Welles stated, "We feel in the theatre that our very life's blood is the Federal Theatre. … We believe that we depend upon the Federal Theatre not only for new mediums but a new audience." Welles told Congressional opponents, "You are legislating against one of the most important things that ever happened in a Democratic government.")		Yes			
July 2	CBS	30 min.	Knickerbocker Playhouse	"Fleurette" (Note: Adapted from the poem by Robert W. Service. Cast: Orson Welles (Bruce Yorke), Elliott Lewis (host).)		Yes			
September 10	CBS	60 min.	The Campbell Playhouse	"Peter Ibbetson" (Note: Adapted from the novel by George du Maurier. Cast: Orson Welles (Peter Ibbetson), Helen Hayes (Mary, Duchess of Towers), John Emery (Colonel Ibbetson), Agnes Moorehead (Mrs. Deane), Vera Allen (Madame Seraskier), Everett Sloane (Crockett), Eustace Wyatt (Warden), Ray Collins (Governor), George Coulouris (Chaplain), Edgar Barrier (Judge), Richard Wilson (Turnkey), Kingsley Colton (Peter as a child), Betty Philson (Mary as a child).)	Yes	Yes	Yes	Yes	Yes
September 17	CBS	60 min.	The Campbell Playhouse	"Ah, Wilderness!" (Note: Adapted from the play by Eugene O'Neill. Cast: Orson Welles (Richard Miller), Ray Collins (Nat Miller), Arlene Francis (Muriel McComber), Agnes Moorehead, Everett Sloane, Joseph Cotten, Frank Readick, Paul Stewart, Richard Wilson, Howard Teichmann, Eda Heinmann. Interview with George Jean Nathan.)	Yes	Yes	Yes	Yes	Yes
September 24	CBS	60 min.	The Campbell Playhouse	"What Every Woman Knows" (Note: Adapted from the play by J. M. Barrie. Cast: Orson Welles (John Shand), Helen Hayes (Maggie Wylie), Alred Shirley (Alick Sylie), Everett Sloane (David Wylie), Agnes Moorehead (Countess), Naomi Campbell (Lady Sybil), Eustace Wyatt (Mr. Venables), Ray Collins (Willy Cameron).)	Yes	Yes	Yes	Yes	Yes
September 28	CBS	60 min.	Columbia Workshop	"The Fall of the City" (Note: Original radio play by Archibald MacLeish. Cast: Orson Welles, Burgess Meredith and 500 USC students at the Los Angeles Colosseum. Frank Brady: "Even though he was contractually free to do so (he could make three non-Campbell appearances) the sponsors became angry, claiming he was doing too much.")		Yes			
October 1	CBS	60 min.	The Campbell Playhouse	"The Count of Monte Cristo" (Note: Adapted from the novel by Alexandre Dumas. Cast: Orson Welles (Edmond Dantés, the Count), Everett Sloane (Abbé Faria), Richard Wilson (a Jailer), Agnes Moorehead (Mercédès), George Coulouris, Edgar Barrier, Frank Readick, Ray Collins.)	Yes	Yes	Yes	Yes	Yes
October 8	CBS	60 min.	The Campbell Playhouse	"Algiers" (Note: Adapted from the screenplay by John Howard Lawson and James M. Cain. Cast: Orson Welles (Pepe Le Moko), Paulette Goddard (Gabby), Ray Collins, Edgar Barrier, Benny Rubin Gus Schilling, Everett Sloane, William Alland, Richard Wilson, Bea Benaderet. Paulette Goddard is interviewed.)	Yes	Yes	Yes	Yes	Yes
October 15	CBS	60 min.	The Campbell Playhouse	"Escape" (Note: Adapted from the play by John Galsworthy. Cast: Orson Welles (Matt Denant), Wendy Barrie (Lady in the hotel), Ray Collins (Murdered cop, Forgiving Judge, Unforgiving Farmer), Jack Smart (another Cop, Farmhand), Edgar Barrier (Priest and Cabbie), Bea Benaderet (Girl in park, Woman at picnic), Harriet Kay (Maid), Mabel Albertson (Bessie), Benny Rubin (Man at picnic), William Alland, Richard Wilson.)	Yes	Yes	Yes	Yes	Yes
October 22	CBS	60 min.	The Campbell Playhouse	"Liliom" (Note: Adapted from the play by Ferenc Molnár. Cast: Orson Welles (Liliom), Helen Hayes (Julie), Agnes Moorehead (Mrs. Muskat), Joan Tetzell (Marie), Frank Readick (Ficsur), Bill Adams (Sheriff), Joseph Cotten (the Cashier), Betty Feldson (Louise).)	Yes	Yes	Yes	Yes	Yes
October 29	CBS	60 min.	The Campbell Playhouse	"The Magnificent Ambersons" (Note: Adapted from the novel by Booth Tarkington. Cast: Orson Welles (George Amberson Minafer), Walter Huston (Eugene Morgan), Nan Sunderland (Isabel Amberson), Ray Collins (Fred Amberson), Eric Burtis (Young George Minafer), Marion Burns (Lucy Morgan), Everett Sloane (Archie Malloch Smith), Richard Wilson (Reverend Malloch Smith), Bea Benaderet (Mrs. Foster), William Alland (Neighbor), Elliott Reid. Interview with Walter Huston and Nan Sunderlund, Mrs. Walter Huston.)	Yes	Yes	Yes	Yes	Yes
November 5	CBS	60 min.	The Campbell Playhouse	"The Hurricane" (Note: Adapted from the novel by Charles Nordhoff and James Norman Hall. Cast: Orson Welles (Eugene de Laage), Mary Astor (Germaine de Laage), Ray Collins (Father Paul), Everett Sloane (Captain Nagle), Edgar Barrier (Terangi), Bea Benaderet (Marani), Eric Burgess (Mako), George Coulouris, William Alland, Richard Wilson, others.)	Yes	Yes	Yes	Yes	Yes
November 8	NBC	60 min.	Town Hall Tonight	(Note: Later known as The Fred Allen Show. One of the first of many guest appearances Welles makes on comedy-variety programs.)	Yes	Yes			
November 12	CBS	60 min.	The Campbell Playhouse	"The Murder of Roger Ackroyd" (Note: Adapted from the novel by Agatha Christie. First of several episodes scripted by Herman J. Mankiewicz. Cast: Orson Welles (Hercule Poirot, Dr. James Sheppard), Edna May Oliver (Caroline Sheppard), Alan Napier (Roger Ackroyd), Brenda Forbes (Mrs. Ackroyd), George Coulouris (Inspector Hempstead), Ray Collins (Mr. Raymond), Everett Sloane (Parker, the butler). Interview with Edna May Oliver.)	Yes	Yes	Yes	Yes	Yes
November 19	CBS	60 min.	The Campbell Playhouse	"The Garden of Allah" (Note: Adapted from the novel by Robert Hichens. Cast: Orson Welles (Boris Androvsky), Madeleine Carroll (Domini Enfilden), Everett Sloane (Count Anteoni), George Coulouris (Father Roubier), Ray Collins (Lt. de Trevignac).)	Yes	Yes	Yes	Yes	Yes
November 26	CBS	60 min.	The Campbell Playhouse	"Dodsworth" (Note: Adapted by Herman J. Mankiewicz from the novel by Sinclair Lewis and the play by Sidney Howard. Cast: Orson Welles (Sam Dodsworth), Fay Bainter (Fran Dodsworth), Nan Sunderland (Edith Cortright), Dennis Green (Major Lockert), Edgar Barrier (Kurt von Obersdorf), Ray Collins (Tubby), Natasha Latische (Mme. de Penalbe), Brenda Forbes (the Baroness). Fay Bainter and Nan Sunderland reprise the roles they created in the original Broadway production.)	Yes	Yes	Yes	Yes	Yes
December 3	CBS	60 min.	The Campbell Playhouse	"Lost Horizon" (Note: Adapted from the novel by James Hilton. Cast: Orson Welles (Father Perrault/High Lama), Sigrid Gurie (Chinese Woman).)	Yes	Yes	Yes	Yes	Yes
December 10	CBS	60 min.	The Campbell Playhouse	"Vanessa'" (Note: Adapted from the novel by Hugh Walpole. Cast: Orson Welles (Benjie), Helen Hayes (Vanessa, Judith), Alfred Shirley (Adam), Eustace Wyatt (Uncle Will), Kingsley Colton (Benjie's son).)	Yes	Yes	Yes	Yes	Yes
December 17	CBS	60 min.	The Campbell Playhouse	"There's Always a Woman" (Note: Adapted from the screenplay by Gladys Lehman. Last episode scripted by John Houseman, who leaves the Mercury Theatre after an argument with Welles. Cast: Orson Welles (Bill Reardon), Marie Wilson (Sally Reardon), Ray Collins (Nicky Shane), Everett Sloane (Grigson, the butler), Edgar Barrier (Jerry Marlow), Mary Taylor (Lola Fraser), Georgia Backus (Ann Calhoun), Frank Readick (the D.A.), Richard Wilson (Walter Fraser).)	Yes	Yes	Yes	Yes	Yes
December 24	CBS	60 min.	The Campbell Playhouse	"A Christmas Carol" (Note: Adaptation of the novella by Charles Dickens. Cast: Orson Welles (Narrator), Lionel Barrymore (Ebenezer Scrooge), Everett Sloane, Frank Readick, Erskine Sanford, George Coulouris, Ray Collins, Georgia Backus, Bea Benaderet, Edgar Barrier, Richard Wilson, others.)	Yes	Yes	Yes	Yes	Yes
December 31	CBS	60 min.	The Campbell Playhouse	"Come and Get It" (Note: Adaptation of the novel by Edna Ferber. Cast: Everett Sloane (Narrator), Orson Welles (Barney), Frances Dee (Lotta), Frank Readick, Ray Collins, Edgar Barrier, Georgia Backus, William Alland, others.)	Yes	Yes	Yes	Yes	Yes

== 1940 ==
Date	Network	Length	Series	Details	Surviving recording	Involvement			
Date	Network	Length	Series	Details	Surviving recording	Actor	Director	Producer	Writer
January 7	CBS	60 min.	The Campbell Playhouse	"Vanity Fair" (Note: Adapted by Herman J. Mankiewicz from the novel by William Makepeace Thackeray. Cast: Orson Welles (the Marquis), Helen Hayes (Becky Sharp), John Hoysradt (Rawdon Crawley), Agnes Moorehead (Miss Crawley), Naomi Campbell (Amelia Sedley), Betty Garde, Eustace Wyatt, Joseph Holland, Edgar Kent, others.)	Yes	Yes	Yes	Yes	Yes
January 14	CBS	60 min.	The Campbell Playhouse	"Theodora Goes Wild" (Note: Adaptation of an original story by Mary Eunice McCarthy and screenplay by Sidney Buchman. Cast: Orson Welles (Michael Grant), Loretta Young (Theodora Lynn), Ray Collins (Jed Waterbury), Everett Sloane (Father Grant), Clara Blandick (Aunt Rebecca), Frank Readick (Arthur Stevenson), Mary Taylor (Mrs. Stevenson), Georgia Backus (Mrs. Michael Grant), William Alland, Richard Wilson, others.)	Yes	Yes	Yes	Yes	Yes
January 21	CBS	60 min.	The Campbell Playhouse	"The Citadel" (Note: Adapted from the novel by A. J. Cronin. Cast: Orson Welles (Andrew Manson), Geraldine Fitzgerald (Christine), Everett Sloane (Dr. Ivory), Mary Taylor (Mrs. Laurence), Ray Collins (the Rector), Edgar Barrier (Dr. Freedman), George Coulouris (Dr. Denny), Georgia Backus (Mrs. Higgins), Robert Coote (Dr. Fred Hampton), William Alland, Richard Wilson, others.)	Yes	Yes	Yes	Yes	Yes
January 28	CBS	60 min.	The Campbell Playhouse	"It Happened One Night" (Note: Adapted from the short story by Samuel Hopkins Adams and motion picture screenplay by Robert Riskin. Cast: Orson Welles (Mr. Andrews), William Powell (Peter Grant), Miriam Hopkins (Ellie Andrews), Everett Sloane, Ray Collins, Richard Wilson, William Alland, others.)	Yes	Yes	Yes	Yes	Yes
February 4	CBS	60 min.	The Campbell Playhouse	"Broome Stages" (Note: Adapted from the novel by Clemence Dane. Cast: Orson Welles (Harry Broome, Edmond Broome), Helen Hayes (Donna Broome), John Hoysradt (Steven Broome), Agnes Moorehead, Eustace Syatt, Everett Sloane, William Alland, Richard Wilson, others.)	Yes	Yes	Yes	Yes	Yes
February 11	CBS	60 min.	The Campbell Playhouse	"Mr. Deeds Goes to Town" (Note: Adapted from the story "Opera Hat" by Clarence Budington Kelland and the motion picture screenplay by Robert Riskin. Cast: Orson Welles (Longfellow Deeds), Gertrude Lawrence (Brenda Bennett), Everett Sloane (John Cedar), Paul Stewart (Cornelius Cobb), Frank Readick (the Judge), Edgar Barrier (Mr. Buddington), Agnes Moorehead (a Pixilated Lady), Jane Hauston (a Pixilated Lady), Ernest Chappell (Bailiff), Edwin C. Hill (Ernest Chappell), with Richard Wilson, Howard Teichmann and Joseph Cotten as a number of people.)	Yes	Yes	Yes	Yes	Yes
February 18	CBS	60 min.	The Campbell Playhouse	"Dinner at Eight" (Note: Adapted from the play by George S. Kaufman and Edna Ferber. Cast: Orson Welles (Dan Packard, Larry Renault), Marjorie Rambeau (Carlotta Vance), Hedda Hopper (Millicent Jordan), Lucille Ball (Kitty Packard), Charles Trowbridge (Oliver Jordan), Clara Blandick (Hattie Loomis), Mary Taylor (Paula Jordan), Edgar Barrier (Dr. Talbot), Benny Rubin (Max, the agent), George Coulouris, Richard Wilson, others.)	Yes	Yes	Yes	Yes	Yes
February 25	CBS	60 min.	The Campbell Playhouse	"Only Angels Have Wings" (Note: Adapted from the story by Howard Hawks and screenplay by Jules Furthman. Cast: Orson Welles (Geoff Carter), Joan Blondell (Bonnie Lee), Regis Toomey (the Kid), Edmond McDonald (Les Peters), Edgar Barrier (Ashton Stevens), George Coulouris (Dutchy), William Alland (Joe Souther), Richard Baer (Tex), Richard Wilson (Pete).)	Yes	Yes	Yes	Yes	Yes
March 3	CBS	60 min.	The Campbell Playhouse	"Rabble in Arms" (Note: Adapted from the novel by Kenneth Roberts. Cast: Orson Welles (Benedict Arnold), Frances Dee (Ellen Phipps), George Coulouris (Captain Peter Merrill), Robert Warwick (Captain Nason), Richard Baer (Huck), Edward Donahue (Guy), Richard Wilson (Scott Flick), Georgia Backus (Madame), William Alland, others.)	Yes	Yes	Yes	Yes	Yes
March 10	CBS	60 min.	The Campbell Playhouse	"Craig's Wife" (Note: Adapted from the play by George Kelly. Cast: Orson Welles (Walter Craig), Ann Harding (Harriet Craig), Janet Beecher (Miss Austen), Mary Taylor (Ethel Landreth), Regis Toomey (Billy Birkmire), Clara Blandick (Mrs. Harold), Bea Benaderet (Mazie), Richard Baer (Policeman), George Coulouris, Richard Wilson, others.)	Yes	Yes	Yes	Yes	Yes
March 17	NBC	30 min.	The Jell-O Program Starring Jack Benny	(Note: Cast: Jack Benny, Don Wilson, Phil Harris, Dennis Day, Orson Welles (himself, coaching Benny's acting).)	Yes	Yes	Yes	Yes	Yes
March 17	CBS	60 min.	The Campbell Playhouse	"Huckleberry Finn" (Note: Adapted by Herman J. Mankiewicz from the novel by Mark Twain. Cast: Orson Welles (Narrator, Dauphin, Huckleberry Finn), Jackie Cooper (Huckleberry Finn), Walter Catlett (Duke), Clarence Muse (Jim), Erskine Sanford, Georgia Backus, William Alland, Richard Wilson, others.)	Yes	Yes	Yes	Yes	Yes
March 24	CBS	60 min.	The Campbell Playhouse	"June Moon" (Note: Adapted from the play by Ring Lardner and George S. Kaufman. Cast: Orson Welles (Candy Butcher on train), Jack Benny (Fred Stevens), Benny Rubin (Maxie Schwartz), Gus Schilling (Paul Sears), Bea Benaderet (Lucille Sears), Lee Patrick (Eileen), Virginia Gordon (Edna Baker).)	Yes	Yes	Yes	Yes	Yes
March 31	CBS	60 min.	The Campbell Playhouse	"Jane Eyre" (Note: Adapted from the novel by Charlotte Brontë. Cast: Orson Welles (Mr. Rochester), Madeleine Carroll (Jane Eyre), Cecilia Loftus (Mrs. Fairfax), Robert Coote (Mr. Brocklehurst), Serita Whooton (Young Jane), George Coulouris (the Innkeeper), Edgar Barrier (the Priest). After 20 shows, Campbell began exercising more creative control over The Campbell Playhouse. Campbell had complete control over story selection, and frequently clashed with Welles over story and casting. Amiable classics were chosen over many of Welles's story suggestions, including Of Human Hearts. As his contract with Campbell came to an end, Welles determined not to sign on for another season. After this broadcast—a reprise of Jane Eyre, after Welles's suggestion of Alice Adams was not accepted—Welles and Campbell parted amicably.)	Yes	Yes	Yes	Yes	Yes
August 3	Mutual	70 min.	This is Radio	(Note: Welles made his live contribution between takes while shooting Citizen Kane. Recreation of the history of radio, presented by the New York World's Fair and the Golden Gate International Exposition on the eve of the National Association of Broadcasters meeting in San Francisco. Arthur E. Baird (Professor Quiz), Earle Graser (The Lone Ranger), Orson Welles, Morton Downey, Hedda Hopper, Gene Autry, Kay Kyser, F. Chase Taylor, Olive Palmer, Gertrude Berg, Edward Bowes, H. V. Kaltenborn, Ray Perkins, Guy Lombardo, Graham McNamee, Jessica Dragonette, Tommy Riggs, Kate Smith, Paul Whiteman.)	Yes	Yes			
October 28	KTSA	30 min.	Interview	Wells and Welles (Note: Charles Shaw's interview program broadcast from San Antonio includes a 7.5-minute discussion between H. G. Wells and Orson Welles (their only meeting) regarding "The War of the Worlds", the effect of war on the arts, and the imminent filming of Citizen Kane.)	Yes	Yes			
December 19	NBC	30 min.	The Rudy Vallee Sealtest Show	(Note: Welles and John Barrymore perform a scene from Julius Caesar and in a skit titled "The Life of John Barrymore". Cast: Rudy Vallee, Orson Welles, John Barrymore, Art Balinger (announcer).)	Yes	Yes			

== 1941 ==
Date	Network	Length	Series	Details	Surviving recording	Involvement			
Date	Network	Length	Series	Details	Surviving recording	Actor	Director	Producer	Writer
January 16	NBC	30 min.	The Rudy Vallee Sealtest Show	(Note: Cast: Rudy Vallee, Orson Welles, John Barrymore, Susan Miller, Lurene Tuttle, Ed Gardner (director).)	Yes	Yes			
February 22	WNEW	60 min.	George Washington, American	(Note: Observance of George Washington's 209th birthday. Cast: Orson Welles (George Washington, others).)	Yes	Yes			
March 15	Blue	30 min.	Duffy's Tavern	(Note: Welles makes a guest appearance.)		Yes			
March 30	CBS	30 min.	The Silver Theatre	"One Step Ahead" (Note: Written by John La Touche. Cast: Orson Welles, Lurene Tuttle, Mary Shipp, Joseph Kearns, Conrad Nagel (host), True Eames Boardman (adaptor), Felix Mills (music director).)	Yes	Yes			
April 6	CBS	30 min.	The Free Company	"His Honor, the Mayor" (Note: One in a series of original radio plays about American civil liberties. Cast: James Boyd (host), Orson Welles (narrator), Ray Collins (Bill Knaggs), Agnes Moorehead (Mary Knaggs), Paul Stewart, Erskine Sanford, Richard Wilson, Betty Garde, Alice Frost, Everett Sloane.)	Yes	Yes	Yes		Yes
April 17	NBC	30 min.	The Rudy Vallee Sealtest Show	(Note: Cast: Rudy Vallee, Orson Welles, Dorothy Lamour.)	Yes	Yes			
May 8	NBC	30 min.	The Rudy Vallee Sealtest Show	(Note: Cast: Rudy Vallee, Orson Welles, John Barrymore.)	Yes	Yes			
May 28		15 min.	Citizen Kane Interview	Welles and Dorothy Comingore at the Hollywood premiere	Yes	Yes			
September 1	CBS	30 min.	Forecast	"Jubilee" (Note: Welles introduces this pilot for an all-star Negro variety show. Cast: Ethel Waters, Duke Ellington, The Hall Johnson Choir, Hamtree Harrington, Flournoy Miller, The Juanita Hall Choir, Wonderful Smith, Georgette Harvey, Juano Hernández (narrator).)	Yes	Yes			
September 15	CBS	30 min.	The Orson Welles Show	"Sredni Vashtar", "Hidalgo", "An Irishman and a Jew" (Note: "Ladies and gentlemen, we started off the first show of this series for Lady Esther with Saki's eeriest little legend, 'Sredni Vashtar'." Starring Blanche Yurka (Mrs. De Ropp); Conrad Binyon (Conradin), Brenda Forbes (Matilda). "Almanac", segment celebrating famous birthdays and interesting events, marks the Cry of Dolores and the beginning of Mexico's fight for independence from Spain. "Hidalgo", original play, with Dolores del Río and Pedro de Cordoba (Miguel Hidalgo). Meade Lux Lewis plays boogie-woogie. "An Irishman and a Jew" by Geoffrey Household, with Osa Massen (Berta). Welles banters throughout with Jiminy Cricket (Cliff Edwards).)	Yes	Yes	Yes	Yes	Yes
September 22	CBS	30 min.	The Orson Welles Show	"The Right Side", "The Sexes", "The Golden Honeymoon" (Note: Elliott Lewis (Faust) and Ray Collins (Devil) present "The Right Side". Betty Field and Richard Carlson perform "The Sexes" by Dorothy Parker. "Murder in the Bank" with Ruth Gordon. "The Golden Honeymoon" by Ring Lardner, with Ruth Gordon (Mother) and Orson Welles (Father). "Almanac" and banter with Jiminy Cricket.)		Yes	Yes	Yes	Yes
September 29	CBS	30 min.	The Orson Welles Show	"The Interlopers", "I'm a Fool" (Note: Original radio play with Elliott Lewis (narrator), Ray Collins and Orson Welles. "Almanac" and banter with Jiminy Cricket. Welles reads the "Song of Solomon". Welles and Nancy Gates, in her radio debut, conclude the show with an adaptation of Sherwood Anderson's 1922 short story.)	Yes	Yes	Yes	Yes	Yes
October 6	CBS	30 min.	The Orson Welles Show	"The Black Pearl" (Note: Debut radio play by Norman Foster. Cast: Orson Welles, Edgar Barrier, Ray Collins, Dorothy Comingore, Joseph Cotten, Erskine Sanford, Paul Stewart. "Almanac" notes it is the birthday of Edgar Allan Poe; Welles reads "Annabel Lee".)	Yes	Yes	Yes	Yes	Yes
October 13	CBS	30 min.	The Orson Welles Show	"If In Years to Come" (Note: Story by Earl Reed Silvers, with Orson Welles, Marsha Hunt and Agnes Moorehead. "Almanac", including a brief skit set in Noah Webster's library, with Lucille Ball, Joseph Cotten and Marsha Hunt. Four poems by Dorothy Parker, read by Lucille Ball.)	Yes	Yes	Yes	Yes	Yes
October 18	CBS	45 min.	A Night of Stars	(Note: Dedication of the new 50,000-watt transmitter at New York's WABC radio, with greetings from New York, Hollywood and London. Cast: Orson Welles, Mayor Fiorello La Guardia, Alexander Woollcott (speaking from London), Bob Burns, Ed Gardner, Kate Smith, Howard Barlow and his orchestra, Andre Kostelanetz and his orchestra.)		Yes			
October 20	CBS	30 min.	The Orson Welles Show	"Romance", "The Prisoner of Assiout" (Note: Adaptations of two short stories, the first by Ellis Parker Butler, with Joseph Cotten (narrator), Tim Holt, Anne Baxter, Agnes Moorehead, Ray Collins; the second by Grant Allen, with Orson Welles, Everett Sloane, Ray Collins, Erskine Sanford, Edgar Barrier, Marlo Dwyer. Welles reads a sonnet by Shakespeare.)	Yes	Yes	Yes	Yes	Yes
November 3	CBS	30 min.	The Orson Welles Show	"Wild Oranges" (Note: Adapted from the novella by Joseph Hergesheimer, filmed in 1924; with Frances Dee (Millie), Ray Collins (Father), Paul Stewart (Halvard), Gale Gordon (Nicholas), Orson Welles (John Woolfolk).)	Yes	Yes	Yes	Yes	Yes
November 10	CBS	30 min.	The Orson Welles Show	"That's Why I Left You", "The Maysville Minstrel" (Note: Two stories, the first a romance written for the program by John Nesbitt, with Ray Collins (narrator), Orson Welles and Agnes Moorehead; and the second by Ring Lardner, with Stuart Erwin, June Collyer, Joseph Cotten and Ray Collins. Welles closes with "Almanac", marking the birthday of Oliver Goldsmith.)	Yes	Yes	Yes	Yes	Yes
November 17	CBS	30 min.	The Orson Welles Show	"The Hitch-Hiker" (Note: Premiere of the radio play by Lucille Fletcher. Cast: Orson Welles.)		Yes	Yes	Yes	Yes
November 24	CBS	30 min.	The Orson Welles Show	"A Farewell to Arms" (Note: Adaptation of the novel by Ernest Hemingway. Cast: Ginger Rogers (Catherine), Orson Welles (Frederick Henry).)		Yes	Yes	Yes	Yes
December 1	CBS	30 min.	The Orson Welles Show	"Something's Going to Happen to Henry", "Wilbur Brown, Habitat: Brooklyn" (Note: Adaptations of two short stories, the first by Wilma Shore and Louis Solomon, with Janet Gaynor, Joseph Cotten, Ray Collins, Glenn Anders; the second by Arthur Stander, with Orson Welles, Ray Collins, Glenn Anders.)	Yes	Yes	Yes	Yes	Yes
December 7	CBS	30 min.	The Orson Welles Show	"Symptoms of Being 35", "Leaves of Grass" (Note: Abbreviated program. Joseph Cotten presents a "little divertisement" by Ring Lardner. Welles reads selected poetry by Walt Whitman.)	Yes	Yes	Yes	Yes	Yes
December 7	CBS	30 min.	The Gulf Screen Guild Theatre	"Between Americans" (Note: Written by Norman Corwin. Cast: Orson Welles, Roger Pryor (host), Bud Hiestand (announcer), Oscar Bradley (music), Frank Tours (music assistant).)	Yes	Yes			
December 15	Red	30 min.	The Cavalcade of America	"The Great Man Votes" (Note: Broadcast from Hollywood. Cast: Orson Welles, Ray Collins, Bud Hiestand (announcer), Gayne Whitman (narrator), Peter Lyon (adaptor), Homer Fickett (producer, director), Robert Armbruster (composer, conductor).)	Yes	Yes			
December 15	CBS; Red; Blue; Mutual	60 min.	We Hold These Truths	Dramatic celebration of the Bill of Rights on its 150th anniversary (Note: Closing remarks by President Franklin D. Roosevelt from Washington, D.C. Winner of the Peabody Award for Outstanding Entertainment in Drama. Cast: Lionel Barrymore, Orson Welles (narrator), Edward Arnold, Walter Brennan, Bob Burns, Dane Clark, Walter Huston, Elliott Lewis, Marjorie Main, Edward G. Robinson, James Stewart (narrator), Rudy Vallee, Leopold Stokowski conducting the New York Philharmonic Symphony Orchestra, Norman Corwin (director, producer, writer), Bernard Herrmann (music).)	Yes	Yes			
December 22	CBS	30 min.	The Orson Welles Show	"The Happy Prince" (Note: Story by Oscar Wilde, with Orson Welles, Ray Collins, Agnes Moorehead, Joseph Cotten, Edgar Barrier, Erskine Sanford, Gus Schilling, Tim Holt. Welles reads Luke, chapter 2 (The Nativity) and a Christmas poem by G. K. Chesterton.)	Yes	Yes	Yes	Yes	Yes
December 29	CBS	30 min.	The Orson Welles Show	"There are Frenchmen and Frenchmen" (Note: Adapted by Joseph Cotten from the story by Richard Connell. Cast: Rita Hayworth, Orson Welles, Lurene Tuttle, Joseph Cotten. First meeting of Welles and Hayworth.)	Yes	Yes	Yes	Yes	Yes

== 1942 ==
Date	Network	Length	Series	Details	Surviving recording	Involvement			
Date	Network	Length	Series	Details	Surviving recording	Actor	Director	Producer	Writer
January 5	CBS	30 min.	The Orson Welles Show	"The Garden of Allah" (Note: Adapted from the novel by Robert Hichens. Guest stars: Merle Oberon, Cedric Hardwicke.)	Yes	Yes	Yes	Yes	Yes
January 12	CBS	30 min.	The Orson Welles Show	"The Apple Tree" (Note: By John Galsworthy. Cast: Orson Welles (Frank), Geraldine Fitzgerald (Megan), Ray Collins (Phil).)	Yes	Yes	Yes	Yes	Yes
January 19	CBS	30 min.	The Orson Welles Show	"My Little Boy" (Note: By Carl Ewald. Cast: Dix Davis, Orson Welles, Ruth Warrick, Ray Collins, Barbara Jean Wong.)	Yes	Yes	Yes	Yes	Yes
January 25	CBS	30 min.	Red Cross Program	(Note: Cast: Alexander Woollcott, Ethel Barrymore, Orson Welles. Welles reads the poem American Laughter by Kenneth Robinson.)	Yes	Yes			
January 26	CBS	30 min.	The Orson Welles Show	"The Happy Hypocrite" (Note: By Max Beerbohm. Cast: Orson Welles (narrator), John Barrymore, Maureen O'Sullivan, Agnes Moorehead, Eustace Wyatt, Everett Sloane.)	Yes	Yes	Yes	Yes	Yes
February 2	CBS	30 min.	The Orson Welles Show	"Between Americans" (Note: By Norman Corwin. Welles concludes the series with a statement: "Tomorrow night the Mercury Theatre starts for South America. The reason, put more or less officially, is that I've been asked by the Office of the Coordinator of Inter-American Affairs to do a motion picture especially for Americans in all the Americas, a movie which, in its particular way, might strengthen the good relations now binding the continents of the Western Hemisphere.")	Yes	Yes	Yes	Yes	Yes
April 14	Blue	15 min.	Pan American Day	Broadcast from Brazil	Yes	Yes	Yes	Yes	Yes
April 18	Blue	30 min.	President Vargas's Birthday	Broadcast from Brazil	Yes	Yes	Yes	Yes	Yes
August 29	Blue	120 min.	I Pledge America	(Note: In his first radio project since returning from South America, Welles produces and emcees the first two hours of a seven-hour coast-to-coast War Bond drive broadcast that nets more than $10 million. Cast: Orson Welles (emcee), 21 dance bands and a score of stage and screen and radio stars including Amos 'n' Andy, Dr. Frank Black and His Symphony Orchestra, Fanny Brice, Bob Burns, Jane Cowl, Nelson Eddy, Duke Ellington and His Orchestra, Jane Froman, Edward G. Robinson, Lanny Ross, Carl Sandburg, Dinah Shore, Red Skelton and Meredith Willson. Presented in cooperation with the United States Department of the Treasury, Western Union (which wired bond subscriptions free of charge) and the American Women's Voluntary Services.)		Yes		Yes	
September 2	CBS	30 min.	Suspense	"The Hitch-Hiker" (Note: Radio play by Lucille Fletcher. Cast: Orson Welles, William Spier (producer, director), Bernard Herrmann (composer, conductor).)	Yes	Yes			
September 3	CBS	30 min.	Stage Door Canteen	(Note: Cast: Orson Welles, Irene Dunne.)		Yes			
September 11	Blue	15 min.	Men, Machines and Victory	(Note: Series presented by the National Safety Council. Cast: Orson Welles (narrator).)		Yes			
September 18	NBC	30 min.	Information Please	(Note: First of several appearances Welles makes as guest panelist on this show in which difficult, specialized questions are submitted by listeners. Museum of Broadcasting: "Welles not only answered every question perfectly but he corrected the host." Cast: Clifton Fadiman (host), Milton Cross (announcer), Basil Ruysdael (announcer), John F. Kieran, Franklin P. Adams, Christopher Morley, Orson Welles, L. A. "Speed" Riggs (tobacco auctioneer).)	Yes	Yes			
September 25	CBS	30 min.	The Philip Morris Playhouse	"Crime Without Passion" (Note: By Ben Hecht and Charles MacArthur. Cast: Orson Welles.)		Yes			
September 28	Red	30 min.	The Cavalcade of America	"Juarez: Thunder from the Mountains" (Note: Adapted by Arthur Miller from the book by Nina Brown Baker. Historical drama about the life of Benito Juárez. Cast: Orson Welles (narrator, performer), Bud Collyer (announcer), Ted Jewett (doubles), Stefan Schnabel (doubles), Karl Swenson (triples), Alfred Shirley (doubles), Arlene Francis, Frank Readick, Kenny Delmar (doubles), Paul Stewart (doubles), Edwin Jerome (triples), Homer Fickett (producer, director), Donald Voorhees (composer, conductor).)	Yes	Yes			
October 2	CBS	30 min.	Russian-American Festival	"Peter and the Wolf" (Note: By Sergei Prokofiev. Welles narrates the performance by the Columbia Concert Orchestra, directed by Bernard Herrmann (last of the series).)		Yes			
October 5	NBC	30 min.	The Cavalcade of America	"Passage to More Than India"		Yes			
October 11	CBS	30 min.	Radio Reader's Digest	(Note: Welles reads the sonnet "High Flight" by John Gillespie Magee Jr., and performs "The Man Who Killed Lincoln" by Philip Van Doren Stern.)		Yes			
October 12	Red	30 min.	The Cavalcade of America	"Admiral of the Ocean Sea" (Note: Adapted by Orson Welles, Norris Houghton and Robert Meltzer from the book by Samuel Eliot Morison. Entertaining and factual look at the legend of Christopher Columbus. Cast: Orson Welles, Bud Collyer (announcer), Sarah Fussell, Karl Swenson (doubles), Stefan Schnabel (doubles), Everett Sloane (doubles), Frank Readick (triples), Ted Jewett (doubles), Kenny Delmar, Ian Martin, Edwin Jerome, Homer Fickett (producer, director), Arden Cornwell (composer), Donald Voorhees (conductor). Welles begins the broadcast with the words, "Hello Americans", the title chosen for his future radio series. Translated into Spanish and Portuguese and rebroadcast to Latin America by the Office of the Coordinator of Inter-American Affairs. Radio play (retitled Columbus Day) published in Radio Drama in Action (Farrar & Rinehart 1945) edited by Erik Barnouw.)	Yes	Yes			Yes
October 13	CBS	30 min.	Annual United Fund Appeal	"Hospitals in Wartime" (Note: Radio play narrated by Orson Welles.)		Yes			
October 15	CBS	30 min.	Stage Door Canteen	(Note: Cast: Orson Welles, Anna Neagle, Ethel Merman.)		Yes			
October 16	CBS	30 min.	The Philip Morris Playhouse	"The Hitch-Hiker" (Note: Radio play by Lucille Fletcher. Cast: Orson Welles.)		Yes			
October 18	CBS	30 min.	The Texaco Star Theatre	(Note: Rebroadcast on Armed Forces Radio Service. Guest star Welles in a parody of Les Misérables. Cast: Fred Allen (host), Portland Hoffa, Kenny Delmar, Alan Reed, Benay Venuta, Arthur Godfrey (announcer), Victor Knight (director).)	Yes	Yes			
October 25	CBC	30 min.	Nazi Eyes on Canada	"Alameda" (Note: Welles narrates an alternative history dramatization of the consequences of a Nazi takeover of a small Canadian town.)	Yes	Yes			
October 26	Red	30 min.	The Cavalcade of America	"In the Best Tradition" (Note: Celebration of the early years of the U.S. Navy, by Peter Lyon. Cast: Orson Welles, Admiral William Blandy (remote from Minneapolis), Bud Collyer (announcer), Homer Fickett (producer, director), Arden Cornwell (composer), Donald Voorhees (conductor).)	Yes	Yes			
November 9	CBS	15 min.	Ceiling Unlimited	"Flying Fortress" (Note: Patriotic series glorifying the aviation industry and dramatizing its role in World War II. Museum of Broadcasting: "Welles wrote, produced, and narrated this show, and his work was considered a prime contribution to the war effort." Script by Ranald MacDougall and Norman Rosten. Cast: Orson Welles, Everett Sloane, Ray Collins; music by Bernard Herrmann.)	Yes	Yes	Yes	Yes	Yes
November 15	CBS	30 min.	Hello Americans	"Brazil" (Note: "Broadcasting from Brazil … by dramatic license." First in a series of variety shows introducing listeners to the peoples and cultures of South and Central America, created with the OCIAA to promote inter-American understanding during World War II. Script by Robert Meltzer, music by Lucien Moraweck. Cast: Orson Welles, Carmen Miranda, Lud Gluskin and His Orchestra. The story of the samba, including lessons on technique and instrumentation. Discussion of Brazil's unique ethnic mix, products and natural resources, and the importance of conserving the Amazon jungle. Welles joins Miranda in singing Ary Barroso's samba, "No Tabuleiro da Baiana".)	Yes	Yes	Yes	Yes	Yes
November 16	CBS	15 min.	Ceiling Unlimited	"Air Transport Command" (Note: A conversation between three elderly veterans traces the history of cargo transportation. Cast: Orson Welles; music by Bernard Herrmann.)	Yes	Yes	Yes	Yes	Yes
November 22	CBS	30 min.	Hello Americans	"The Andes" (Note: The geography and history of the Andes mountain region. Cast: Orson Welles, Edmond O'Brien (Bolivar), Agnes Moorehead, Ray Collins, Elliott Reid, Barbara Jean Wong, Pedro de Cordoba, Hans Conried (Pizarro), Alan Reed, others. Musical compositions by Justin Elie ("A Night in the Andes") and Antônio Carlos Gomes ("Il Guarnye"). Poetry by Norman Rosten.)	Yes	Yes	Yes	Yes	Yes
November 23	CBS	15 min.	Ceiling Unlimited	"The Navigator" (Note: By Orson Welles and Milton Geiger. Cast: Orson Welles, Joseph Cotten, Ray Collins, Agnes Moorehead, Elliott Reid; music by Bernard Herrmann.)	Yes	Yes	Yes	Yes	Yes
November 29	CBS	30 min.	Hello Americans	"The Islands" (Note: The history of Haiti, focusing on Toussaint Louverture, the reign of Henri Christophe, and the influence of Napoleon. Cast: Ray Collins, Hans Conried, Elliott Reid, the Haitian Chorus.)	Yes	Yes	Yes	Yes	Yes
November 30	CBS	15 min.	Ceiling Unlimited	Wind, Sand and Stars (Note: Cast: Orson Welles, Burgess Meredith; music by Bernard Herrmann.)	Yes	Yes	Yes	Yes	Yes
December 4	AFRS	30 min.	Mail Call	(Note: Cast: Orson Welles, Groucho Marx, Gene Autry, Bela Lugosi.)		Yes			
December 6	CBS	30 min.	Hello Americans	"Alphabet A to C" (Note: Welles begins the alphabet of the Antillean islands. Guest singer: Miguelito Valdés.)	Yes	Yes	Yes	Yes	Yes
December 7	CBS	15 min.	Ceiling Unlimited	"Ballad of Bataan" (Note: By Norman Rosten. Cast: Orson Welles; music by Bernard Herrmann.)		Yes	Yes	Yes	Yes
December 13	CBS	30 min.	Hello Americans	"Alphabet C to S" (Note: Welles continues the ABCs of the Caribbean.)	Yes	Yes	Yes	Yes	Yes
December 14	CBS	15 min.	Ceiling Unlimited	"War Workers" (Note: Script by Hans Conreid. Cast: Orson Welles; music by Bernard Herrmann.)	Yes	Yes	Yes	Yes	Yes
December 20	CBS	30 min.	Hello Americans	"Slavery—Abednego" (Note: Welles concludes his alphabet of the Islands, beginning with S—slavery—and the story of Abednego the slave. Written by Orson Welles and John Tucker Battle. Cast: Orson Welles (Sir Barnaby Finch), Elliott Reid (Abednego), Norman Field (Toussaint Louverture), Gerald Mohr (Henri Christophe).)	Yes	Yes	Yes	Yes	Yes
December 21	CBS	15 min.	Ceiling Unlimited	"Gremlins" (Note: Written by Lucille Fletcher. Cast: Orson Welles, Joseph Cotten, Agnes Moorehead, Lou Merrill; music by Bernard Herrmann.)	Yes	Yes	Yes	Yes	Yes
December 24	CBS	30 min.	Stage Door Canteen	(Note: Cast: Orson Welles, Madeleine Carroll, Helen Hayes, Joan Fontaine, Lucy Monroe, Al Jolson, Marion Hutton.)		Yes			
December 27	CBS	30 min.	Hello Americans	"The Bad-Will Ambassador" (Note: Fable about Christmas in the Americas, by Richard Brooks. Cast: Norman Field (Mr. Piexoto, the Brazilian), Elliott Reid (American Airlines representative), Pedro de Cordoba (fat man in Mexico), John Tucker Battle (the Cuban), Hans Conried (the Señor), Orson Welles (Martin Stone).)	Yes	Yes	Yes	Yes	Yes
December 28	CBS	15 min.	Ceiling Unlimited	"Pan American Airlines" (Note: Written by Milton Geiger. Cast: Orson Welles; music by Bernard Herrmann.)	Yes	Yes	Yes	Yes	Yes
1942		15 min.	Go with your Red Cross	(Note: Patriotic fundraising appeal. Cast: Orson Welles.)	Yes	Yes			
1942	Synd	15 min.	Treasury Star Parade	"The Chetniks" (Note: Program #101, written by Violet Atkins. Cast: Vincent Price, Orson Welles, David Broekman and the Treasury Orchestra and Chorus. These patriotic dramas were produced by the U.S. Treasury Department to promote sales of War Bonds, transcribed in New York and Hollywood beginning April 1942 and syndicated on more than 800 stations through 1944. Welles returned to the U.S. from South America August 22, 1942, and began doing guest appearances on radio.)	Yes	Yes			
1942	Synd	15 min.	Treasury Star Parade	"The Ballad of Bataan" (Note: Program #114, written by Norman Rosten. Cast: Vincent Price, Orson Welles, David Broekman and the Treasury Orchestra and Chorus.)	Yes	Yes			
1942	Synd	15 min.	Treasury Star Parade	"An American in Action", "Prayer for Americans" (Note: Program #115. Cast: Vincent Price, Dinah Shore, Helen Hayes, Orson Welles, Larry Elliott (announcer), David Broekman and the Treasury Orchestra and Chorus.)	Yes	Yes			

== 1943 ==
Date	Network	Length	Series	Details	Surviving recording	Involvement			
Date	Network	Length	Series	Details	Surviving recording	Actor	Director	Producer	Writer
January 3	CBS	30 min.	Hello Americans	"Ritmos de las Americas" (Note: Music for the people of two continents. Welles is unable to appear due to illness. Cast: Tito Guízar (host), Dick Joy (announcer), Miguelito Valdés, Sir Lancelot, Lud Gluskin and his Orchestra.)	Yes		Yes	Yes	Yes
January 4	CBS	15 min.	Ceiling Unlimited	"Anti-Submarine Patrol" (Note: Cast: Edward G. Robinson substitutes for Welles; music by Bernard Herrmann.)	Yes		Yes	Yes	Yes
January 10	CBS	30 min.	Hello Americans	"Mexico" (Note: Stories of Montezuma, Hidalgo, Morelos, Juárez and Zapata.)	Yes	Yes	Yes	Yes	Yes
January 11	CBS	15 min.	Ceiling Unlimited	"Finger in the Wind" (Note: The pilot, written by Myron Dutton. Cast: Orson Welles; music by Bernard Herrmann.)	Yes	Yes	Yes	Yes	Yes
January 17	CBS	30 min.	Hello Americans	"Feed the World" (Note: Script by Milton Geiger. Cast: Frank Readick (narrator), Eddie Jerome (Gaucho), Orson Welles (Famine), Carl Swenson, Joseph Cotten, Jack Moss, Louis Solomon.)	Yes	Yes	Yes	Yes	Yes
January 18	CBS	15 min.	Ceiling Unlimited	"Letter to Mother" (Note: Written by John Steinbeck. Cast: Betty Garde (Mother), Orson Welles; music by Bernard Herrmann.)	Yes	Yes	Yes	Yes	Yes
January 24	CBS	30 min.	Hello Americans	"Ritmos de las Americas" (Note: Rhythms of the Americas. Welles is unable to appear due to illness, but is back at work the following day on his penultimate episode of Ceiling Unlimited. Cast: Truman Bradley (host), Diana Gayle, Miguelito Valdés, Carlos Ramírez, Lud Gluskin and His Orchestra.)	Yes		Yes	Yes	Yes
January 25	CBS	15 min.	Ceiling Unlimited	"Mrs. James and the Pot of Tea" (Note: Written by John Tucker Battle. Episode concludes with "Flyer Come Home with Your Wings" by John Steinbeck. Cast: Orson Welles; music by Bernard Herrmann.)	Yes	Yes	Yes	Yes	Yes
January 31	CBS	30 min.	Hello Americans	"Bolivar's Idea" (Note: Inter-American democracy and why it is essential in the war. Incorporates excerpts of Milton Geiger's poem to human civilization, "I Will Not Go Back" (later the centerpiece of the April 1945 broadcast of This Is My Best dedicated to the late President Franklin Roosevelt). Cast: Orson Welles, Ray Collins.)	Yes	Yes	Yes	Yes	Yes
February 1	CBS	15 min.	Ceiling Unlimited	"The Future"	Yes	Yes	Yes	Yes	Yes
March 12	AFRS	30 min.	Mail Call	(Note: Cast: Orson Welles, Shirley Ross, Hanley Stafford.)		Yes			
March 14	NBC	30 min.	The Jack Benny Program	(Note: Welles stands in as host of radio's most popular show when Jack Benny contracts pneumonia after a tour of military camps. Cast: Mary Livingston, Dennis Day, Eddie "Rochester" Anderson, Phil Harris, Don Wilson.)	Yes	Yes			
March 21	NBC	30 min.	The Jack Benny Program	(Note: Welles is substitute host during Benny's illness.)	Yes	Yes			
March 28	NBC	30 min.	The Jack Benny Program	(Note: Welles is substitute host during Benny's illness.)	Yes	Yes			
April 4	CBS	15 min.	Radio Reader's Digest	(Note: Cast: Orson Welles, Wendy Barrie, Monty Woolley.)		Yes			
April 4	NBC	30 min.	The Jack Benny Program	(Note: Welles is substitute host during Benny's illness.)	Yes	Yes			
April 11	NBC	30 min.	The Jack Benny Program	(Note: Welles is Benny's first guest when he returns.)	Yes	Yes			
September 3	CBS	15 min.	Reading Out Loud	(Note: Welles reads and discusses John Donne's "The Sun Rising" and "No Man Is an Island" and excerpts from the biography of George Jessel. Listeners are invited to write the network to determine if this minimalist program should continue.)	Yes	Yes	Yes	Yes	Yes
September 7	KMPC	11 min.	Interview	(Note: At intermission during The Mercury Wonder Show, audience members and cast are interviewed, including Orson Welles and Rita Hayworth (married earlier that day), Marlene Dietrich and Joseph Cotten. Welles remarks that The Mercury Wonder Show has been performed for approximately 48,000 members of the U.S. armed forces.)	Yes	Yes			
September 23	CBS	30 min.	Suspense	"The Most Dangerous Game" (Note: Cast: Orson Welles, Keenan Wynn, Joseph Kearns (Man in Black), William Spier (producer, director), Lucien Moraweck (composer), Bernard Herrmann (conductor).)	Yes	Yes			
September 28	NBC	30 min.	The Pepsodent Show Starring Bob Hope	(Note: Broadcast from the U.S. Naval Air Station at Terminal Island, California. Cast: Bob Hope, Frances Langford, Stan Kenton and His Orchestra, Jerry Colonna, Barbara Jo Allen. Guest star Welles plays a mystic fortuneteller.)	Yes	Yes			
September 30	CBS	30 min.	Suspense	"The Lost Special" (Note: Cast: Orson Welles, Joseph Kearns (Man in Black), William Spier (producer, director), Howard Duff (announcer, Armed Forces Radio Service rebroadcast), Lucien Moraweck (composer), Bernard Herrmann (conductor)/)	Yes	Yes			
October 7	CBS	30 min.	Suspense	"Philomel Cottage" (Note: Cast: Orson Welles, Geraldine Fitzgerald, William Spier (producer, director), Lucien Moraweck (composer), Wilbur Hatch (conductor).)	Yes	Yes			
October 12	Blue	30 min.	Duffy's Tavern	(Note: Welles makes a guest appearance. Cast: Ed Gardner, Shirley Booth, Charlie Cantor.)	Yes	Yes			
October 19	CBS	30 min.	Suspense	"Lazarus Walks" (Note: By J. M. Speed. Cast: Orson Welles, Hans Conreid, Joseph Kearns (Man in Black), Howard Duff (announcer, Armed Forces Radio Service rebroadcast), William Spier (producer, director).)	Yes	Yes			
October 31	CBS	15 min.	Radio Reader's Digest	(Note: Cast: Orson Welles, Brian Aherne.)		Yes			
November 12	CBS	30 min.	The Philip Morris Playhouse	"Shadow of a Doubt"		Yes			
November 14	CBS	90 min.	The New York Philharmonic Symphony Orchestra	(Note: Leonard Bernstein replaces conductor Bruno Walter, who is ill, thereby making his conducting debut. Intermission feature: "The American Scriptures" by Carl Van Doren and Orson Welles (from Chicago, telling the story of Nathan Hale).)	Yes	Yes			
November 14	CBS	30 min.	We, the People	(Note: Welles makes a guest appearance.)		Yes			
November 19	CBS	30 min.	Stage Door Canteen	(Note: Cast: Orson Welles, Ilka Chase, Gregory Ratoff, Connee Boswell.)		Yes			
November 21	CBS	90 min.	The New York Philharmonic Symphony Orchestra	(Note: Artur Rodziński(conductor), Orson Welles (speaker).)	Yes	Yes			
November 21	CBS	30 min.	Take It or Leave It	(Note: Welles makes a guest appearance on this quiz show later called The $64,000 Question.)		Yes			
November 27	CBS	30 min.	Inner Sanctum Mysteries	(Note: Welles makes the first of many guest appearances on this horror anthology series.)		Yes			
November 28	CBS	90 min.	The New York Philharmonic Symphony Orchestra	(Note: Artur Rodziński (conductor), Orson Welles (speaker).)	Yes	Yes			
December 19	CBS	30 min.	The Fred Allen Show	(Note: Welles makes a guest appearance.)	Yes	Yes			
December 21	AFRS	30 min.	Command Performance	"Broadway Edition" (Note: Orson Welles reads "High Flight".)	Yes	Yes			
December 26	CBS	30 min.	The Fred Allen Show	(Note: Welles makes a guest appearance.)	Yes	Yes			

== 1944 ==
Date	Network	Length	Series	Details	Surviving recording	Involvement			
Date	Network	Length	Series	Details	Surviving recording	Actor	Director	Producer	Writer
January 26	CBS	30 min.	The Orson Welles Almanac	(Note: Debut of Welles's variety series broadcast live in California and Arizona. Guest: Groucho Marx. Lud Gluskin and His Orchestra play "I Know That You Know"; Martha Stewart sings "Bésame Mucho". Orson Welles reads some of Thomas Paine's thoughts on liberty. Cast: Orson Welles, Arthur Q. Bryan, Lud Gluskin and His Orchestra, Ray Collins, Agnes Moorehead.)	Yes	Yes	Yes		Yes
February 2	CBS	30 min.	The Orson Welles Almanac	(Note: Guest: Lionel Barrymore. Skit, "The Kiddies' Corner". Swing music and a birthday tribute to Victor Herbert by Lud Gluskin and His Orchestra. Barrymore reads from the writings of George Washington.)	Yes	Yes	Yes		Yes
February 9	CBS	30 min.	The Orson Welles Almanac	(Note: Guest: Ann Sothern. "Abraham Lincoln's Prairie Years," adapted from the Carl Sandburg biography.)	Yes	Yes	Yes		Yes
February 16	CBS	30 min.	The Orson Welles Almanac	(Note: Guest: Robert Benchley. Lecture, "The History of Eskimo Love," by Robert Benchley. Poem, "Colloquy for the States" by Archibald MacLeish.)	Yes	Yes	Yes		Yes
February 23	CBS	30 min.	The Orson Welles Almanac	(Note: Guest: Hedda Hopper. The Nat King Cole Trio performs "Hit that Jive, Jack". Welles reads from The Sword in the Stone by T. H. White. Cast: Orson Welles, Agnes Moorehead, Hans Conreid, John McIntire, John Brown, Walter Tetley, Lud Gluskin and His Orchestra.)	Yes	Yes	Yes		Yes
March 1	CBS	30 min.	The Orson Welles Almanac	(Note: Guest: Victor Moore. Sacre du Printemps (from Small Beer) by Ludwig Bemelmans. The Nat King Cole Trio performs "Solid Potato Salad". Cast: Orson Welles, Agnes Moorehead, Hans Conreid, John McIntire, John Brown, Walter Tetley, Lud Gluskin and His Orchestra.)	Yes	Yes	Yes		Yes
March 8	CBS	30 min.	The Orson Welles Almanac	(Note: Guest: Lucille Ball. Ella Mae Morse sings "Shoo-Shoo Baby". Welles reads "No Man Is an Island" by John Donne. Cast: Orson Welles, Agnes Moorehead, Jack Mather, Hans Conried, Lud Gluskin and His Orchestra.)	Yes	Yes	Yes		Yes
March 15	CBS	30 min.	The Orson Welles Almanac	(Note: Guest: Charles Laughton. Lud Gluskin and His Orchestra play "I'll Get By". Skit: "The Private Life of Charles Laughton". "High Society" performed by Kid Ory (trombone), Mutt Carey (trumpet), Jimmie Noone (clarinet), Buster Wilson (piano), Bud Scott (guitar), Ed Garland (bass) and Zutty Singleton (drums). Tent scene from William Shakespeare's Julius Caesar, with Charles Laughton (Cassius) and Orson Welles (Brutus). Cast: Orson Welles, Agnes Moorehead, John McIntire (announcer), Hans Conried, Lud Gluskin and His Orchestra.)	Yes	Yes	Yes		Yes
March 22	CBS	30 min.	The Orson Welles Almanac	(Note: Guest: Betty Hutton. Welles reads the poem "Ballad of Bataan" by Norman Rosten. Cast: Orson Welles, Agnes Moorehead, John McIntire, Hans Conried, Lud Gluskin and His Orchestra.)	Yes	Yes	Yes		Yes
March 29	CBS	30 min.	The Orson Welles Almanac	(Note: Guest: Mary Boland. Skit: Parody of Lady in the Dark. "Muskrat Ramble" performed by the All Star Jazz Group—Kid Ory (trombone), Jimmie Noone (clarinet), Mutt Carey (trumpet), Buster Wilson (piano), Bud Scott (guitar), Ed Garland (bass) and Zutty Singleton (drums). Marking the birthday of Edmond Rostand, an adaptation of Cyrano de Bergerac written by Ben Hecht. Cast: Orson Welles, Hans Conreid, Lud Gluskin and His Orchestra.)	Yes	Yes	Yes		Yes
April 2	NBC	30 min.	The Charlie McCarthy Show			Yes			
April 5	CBS	30 min.	The Orson Welles Almanac	(Note: Guest: Dennis Day. "That's a Plenty" performed by the All Star Jazz Group—Kid Ory (trombone), Jimmie Noone (clarinet), Mutt Carey (trumpet), Buster Wilson (piano), Bud Scott (guitar), Ed Garland (bass) and Zutty Singleton (drums). Dennis Day sings "Bésame Mucho". Orson Welles reads the speech, "Oh what a rogue and peasant slave", from Hamlet.)	Yes	Yes	Yes		Yes
April 12	CBS	30 min.	The Orson Welles Almanac	(Note: Guest: Monty Woolley. Skit, "The Life of Monty Woolley". "Panama" performed by the All Star Jazz Group—Jimmie Noone (clarinet), Kid Ory (trombone), Mutt Carey (trumpet), Bud Scott (guitar), Ed Garland (bass), Buster Wilson (piano) and Zutty Singleton (drums). Welles reads from Paul's First Epistle to the Corinthians. Cast: Orson Welles, Agnes Moorehead, Hans Conreid, John Brown, Lud Gluskin and His Orchestra, John McIntire, Billy Gilbert.)	Yes	Yes	Yes		Yes
April 13	CBS	30 min.	Suspense	"The Marvelous Barastro" (Note: Written by Ben Hecht. Cast: Orson Welles (dual role), William Spier (producer, director, host), Joseph Kearns (Man in Black), Lucien Moraweck (composer), Lud Gluskin (conductor).)	Yes	Yes			
April 19	CBS	30 min.	The Orson Welles Almanac	(Note: Guest: George Jessel. As the All Star Jazz Group plays "Sweet Lorraine" in the background, Welles speaks extemporaneously for three minutes about clarinetist Jimmie Noone, who died that morning at age 48. "Blues for Jimmie" performed by the All Star Jazz Group—Kid Ory (trombone), Ed Garland (bass), Zutty Singleton (drums), Wade Whaley (substitute clarinet), Buster Wilson (piano) and Bud Scott (guitar). Welles recites Psalm 23.)		Yes	Yes		Yes
April 26	CBS	30 min.	The Orson Welles Almanac	(Note: Guest: Carole Landis. Welles reads the scene from the last act of Macbeth. "Sugar Foot Stomp" performed by the All Star Jazz Group.)		Yes	Yes		Yes
April 27	CBS	30 min.	U.S. Treasury Show	"Three of a Kind" (Note: Cast: Orson Welles, Bert Lahr, Reginald Gardiner, Shirley Mitchell.)		Yes			
May 3	CBS	30 min.	The Orson Welles Almanac	(Note: "This is The Mercury Wonder Show … and we pitched our tents tonight at the Naval Air Station at Terminal Island". Guest: Lucille Ball. Aurora Miranda sings "No Tabuleiro da Baiana", with Welles joining her briefly in duet. Welles reads the honor speech from Henry V. "Savoy Blues" performed by the All Star Jazz Group—Kid Ory (trombone), Mutt Carey (trumpet), Barney Bigard (clarinet), Buster Wilson (piano), Bud Scott (guitar), Ed Garland (bass) and Zutty Singleton (drums).)	Yes	Yes	Yes		Yes
May 4	CBS	30 min.	Suspense	"The Dark Tower" (Note: Cast: Orson Welles (several roles), Hans Conreid, Verna Felton, John McIntire, Jeanette Nolan, Joseph Kearns (Man in Black), William Spier (producer, director, adaptor, editor), Lucien Moraweck (composer), Lud Gluskin (conductor).)	Yes	Yes			
May 10	CBS	30 min.	The Orson Welles Almanac	(Note: Broadcast from the U.S. Army Air Force Redistribution Center in Santa Monica, California. Guests: Jimmy Durante, Aurora Miranda. "Woodrow Wilson".)		Yes	Yes		Yes
May 11	CBS	30 min.	The Dinah Shore Program	(Note: "The Orson Welles Movement for Realism in Radio". Cast: Dinah Shore, Orson Welles, Bea Benederet, Arthur Q. Bryan, Robert Emmett Dolan and His Orchestra, The Joseph Lilley Chorus, Tobe Reed (announcer).)	Yes	Yes			
May 17	CBS	30 min.	The Orson Welles Almanac	(Note: Guest: Ann Sothern. Skit, "Ann Sothern for President", with Welles first as her campaign manager (duet, "Sittin' on the Fence") and, after commercial, as Orson Sothern, First Gentleman of the land in 1964. "Weary Blues" performed by the All Star Jazz Group—Mutt Carey (trumpet), Kid Ory (trombone), Barney Bigard (clarinet), Buster Wilson (piano), Bud Scott (guitar), Ed Garland (bass) and Zutty Singleton (drums). Romeo's last scene from Romeo and Juliet, with Welles (Romeo) and Hans Conreid (Paris).)	Yes	Yes	Yes		Yes
May 18	CBS	30 min.	Suspense	"Donovan's Brain", Part 1 (Note: Cast: Orson Welles (several roles), Hans Conreid, John McIntire, Jeanette Nolan, Joseph Kearns (Man in Black), William Spier (producer, director), Lucien Moraweck (composer), Lud Gluskin (conductor).)	Yes	Yes			
May 20	CBS	60 min.	American Eloquence	(Note: Five days after he is placed on the U.S. Treasury Department payroll as a consulting expert in the War Finance Division (with compensation of $1 per year) Welles begins to promote the Fifth War Loan Drive with a radio symposium on democracy, from Thomas Paine to Thomas Wolfe. Cast: Orson Welles, Charles Laughton, Lionel Barrymore, John Huston, Leopold Stokowski, Oscar Hammerstein II, others.)		Yes	Yes		
May 24	CBS	30 min.	The Orson Welles Almanac	(Note: Broadcast from the Air Service Command Training Center, Fresno, California. The Mercury Wonder Show—"See the greatest magic show you've ever listened to". Guests: Lee and Lyn Wilde, Lois Collier. "Blues in E flat" performed by the All Star Jazz Group and vocalist Helen Andrews. Welles reads a famous open letter in defense of Father Damien.)	Yes	Yes	Yes		Yes
May 25	CBS	30 min.	Suspense	"Donovan's Brain", Part 2 (Note: Cast: Orson Welles, Hans Conreid, John McIntire, Jeanette Nolan, Joseph Kearns (Man in Black), William Spier (producer, director), Lucien Moraweck (composer), Lud Gluskin (conductor).)	Yes	Yes			
May 28	NBC	30 min.	The Charlie McCarthy Show			Yes			
May 31	CBS	30 min.	The Orson Welles Almanac	(Note: "Good evening everybody, this is Orson Welles. Welcome to the Mercury Wonder Show. Tonight we've pitched our tents at the Sixth Ferrying Group, Ferrying Division, of the Air Transport Command at Long Beach, California." Guest: Marjorie Reynolds. Skit, "What a Typical G.I. Soldier Does On Leave". Martha Tilton sings "Take It Easy". Spoof of the recent Suspense broadcast of Donovan's Brain. "Tiger Rag" performed by the Mercury All Star Jazz Combination. Welles reads the sonnet "High Flight" by John Gillespie Magee Jr.)	Yes	Yes	Yes		Yes
June 5	CBS	60 min.	Lux Radio Theatre	"Jane Eyre" (Note: Cast: Orson Welles, Loretta Young, Cecil B. DeMille (host, director, producer).)	Yes	Yes			
June 7	CBS	30 min.	The Orson Welles Almanac	(Note: Special D-Day broadcast dramatizing the lives of various Americans when they hear of the Normandy landings. Cast: Agnes Moorehead, Hans Conried, Orson Welles (host), Lud Gluskin and His Orchestra, John McIntire (announcer).)	Yes	Yes	Yes		Yes
June 12	CBS; Blue; Red; Mutual	60 min.	The Fifth War Loan Drive	(Note: "Civilian D-Day" broadcast from Texarkana, Texas, produced with the U.S. Treasury Department. Kickoff of a four-week national effort and a radio campaign led by Welles, encouraging Americans to buy $16 billion in War Bonds to finance the invasion and the most violent phase of World War II. Americans purchased $20.6 billion in War Bonds June 12–July 8, 1944. Cast: Orson Welles, Agnes Moorehead, Edgar Barrier, Alan Napier, Walter Huston, Keenan Wynn. Includes statements by FDR and Henry Morgenthau Jr.)	Yes	Yes	Yes	Yes	Yes
June 14	CBS	30 min.	The Orson Welles Almanac	(Note: Followup to the June 7 D-Day broadcast from Texarkana includes a skit about a fish peddler who causes a war between Texas and Arkansas. Lud Gluskin and His Orchestra perform Raymond Scott's "Powerhouse". Welles reads Stephen Vincent Benét's A Prayer for the United Nations.)	Yes	Yes	Yes		Yes
June 14	CBS	60 min.	The Fifth War Loan Drive	(Note: Broadcast from the Hollywood Bowl. Cast: Orson Welles, Lionel Barrymore, Henry Morgenthau Jr., Fredric March (narrator), Paul Stewart (producer, director), Peter Lyon (writer).)	Yes	Yes			
June 19	CBS	30 min.	The Fifth War Loan Drive	(Note: Broadcast from Soldier Field, Chicago. Cast: Orson Welles, Lana Turner, Jack Benny, Ray Bolger, Paul Lukas, Henry Morgenthau Jr.)	Yes	Yes	Yes	Yes	Yes
June 21	CBS	30 min.	The Orson Welles Almanac	(Note: Broadcast from the Wrigley Building, Chicago. Guest: Martha O'Driscoll. Ethel Waters sings "Stormy Weather". Welles reads a soliloquy from Richard II.)	Yes	Yes	Yes		Yes
June 28	CBS	30 min.	The Orson Welles Almanac	(Note: Broadcast from Camp Haan in Riverside, California. Guest: Lynn Bari, assisting with a Mercury Wonder Show mindreading experiment and a Mercury Fable about a canteen for WACS. Martha Tilton sings "A Good Man". "Oh, Didn't He Ramble" performed by the Mercury All-Star Jazz Combination. Welles reads from the Epistle of James.)	Yes	Yes	Yes		Yes
July 5	CBS	30 min.	The Orson Welles Almanac	(Note: "Tonight the Mercury Wonder Show is pitching its tent at the Los Angeles Port of Embarkation in Wilmington". Guests: Lana Turner, Keenan Wynn. Skit, a Mercury Fable about a soldier (Orson Welles, singing "You Made Me Love You") who is granted his wish for a magical visit from an invisible Lana Turner. The Mercury All-Star Jazz Combination and Lud Gluskin and His Orchestra play jive.)	Yes	Yes	Yes		Yes
July 12	CBS	30 min.	The Orson Welles Almanac	(Note: "Tonight the Mercury Wonder Show is pitching its tent at Camp Cooke, near Lompoc, California". Guest: Susan Hayward. Kay Thompson sings "Louisiana Purchase". Skit, a WAC's furlough with her husband is disrupted by her family. Welles reads from Richard II. "Royal Garden Blues" performed by the All Star Jazz Group—Kid Ory (trombone), Zutty Singleton (drums), Bud Scott (guitar), Ed Garland (bass), Norman Bowden (trumpet) and Fred Washington (piano).)	Yes	Yes	Yes		Yes
July 19	CBS	30 min.	The Orson Welles Almanac	(Note: Broadcast from Long Beach Coast Guard Camp, California. Ruth Terry sings "Is You Is or Is You Ain't My Baby". Skit, a Mercury Fable called "Life in the Coast Guard". Miguelito Valdés sings "Babalú". Welles reads "With Your Wings" by John Steinbeck.)	Yes	Yes	Yes		Yes
August 13	NBC	30 min.	The Gracie Fields Show	(Note: A look back at the days of vaudeville. Cast: Gracie Fields, Orson Welles, Bill Goodwin (announcer), Lou Bring and His Orchestra.)	Yes	Yes			
September 11	CBS	60 min.	Lux Radio Theatre	"Break of Hearts" (Note: Written by Lester Cohen. Cast: Orson Welles, Rita Hayworth, Cecil B. DeMille (host, producer).)	Yes	Yes			
September 23	CBS	30 min.	Inner Sanctum Mysteries	"The Dream" (Note: Cast: Orson Welles, Himan Brown (director, producer), Milton Lewis (writer).)		Yes			
October 2	NBC		Let Yourself Go	(Note: Broadcast from Chicago. Guest: Orson Welles.)		Yes			
October 6			Now is the Time: A Soliloquy for Election Year	(Note: Welles delivers a campaign speech for FDR, broadcast from Carnegie Hall.)	Yes	Yes			
October 8	Blue	60 min.	Philco Radio Hall of Fame			Yes			
October 11	CBS		Labor Party Broadcast	(Note: Speakers: FDR, Orson Welles.)		Yes			
October 11	WSUN Blue; WSTP Mutual		Democratic Campaign Rally	(Note: Welles is featured speaker at the Pinellas County campaign kickoff in St. Petersburg, Florida.)		Yes			
October 13	NBC	5 min.	Advertisement for the Democratic National Committee		Yes	Yes			
October 15	CBS	60 min.	The Kate Smith Show	"The Dark Hours" (Note: Radio play about Edgar Allan Poe. Cast: Kate Smith (star), Orson Welles, Ted Collins (host).)	Yes	Yes			
October 18	Blue	60 min.	The New York Herald Tribune Forum	"False Issues and the American Presidency" (Note: Speakers: Thomas E. Dewey, Orson Welles (replacing FDR).)	Yes	Yes			
October 27	CBS	10 min.	Welles for Roosevelt			Yes			
October 29	NBC	30 min.	The Charlie McCarthy Show		Yes	Yes			
October 30	Mutual		Welles for Roosevelt			Yes			
November 1	NBC	30 min.	Special Broadcast for the Democratic National Committee	(Note: From New York. Speakers: Orson Welles, Quentin Reynolds, John Gunther, Mark Van Doren.)	Yes	Yes			
November 5	NBC	30 min.	The Charlie McCarthy Show		Yes	Yes			
November 6	CBS; Blue; Red; Mutual	60 min.	Democratic National Committee Program	Norman Corwin's election-eve program (Note: John Dunning: "A 60-minute commercial for Roosevelt, but written as a documentary … The result was a Roosevelt victory, closer than it looked in the electoral college, and a new set of standards for radio. Never again would such a program be allowed." Cast: Humphrey Bogart (host), Judy Garland, Tallulah Bankhead, Lucille Ball, James Cagney, Keenan Wynn, Groucho Marx, Claudette Colbert, Irving Berlin, Joseph Cotten, Rita Hayworth, Walter Huston, Gene Kelly, Danny Kaye, Paul Muni, Edward G. Robinson, Lana Turner, Fay Wray, Dorothy Parker, Charles Boyer, The Ink Spots, Milton Berle, Frank Sinatra. Includes an address by Welles, at FDR's personal request, an 11-minute reprise of Now is the Time: A Soliloquy for Election Year by Norman Corwin.)	Yes	Yes			
November 21	CBS	30 min.	This Is My Best	"Around the World in Eighty Days" (Note: Cast: Orson Welles (who also recites the Cresta Blanca Winery jingle), Wally Maher, Joseph Kearns, Eric Snowden, Walter Tetley, John McIntire (announcer), Robert Tallman (adaptor), Bernard Katz (composer, conductor), Owen James (announcer).)	Yes	Yes			
November 26	Blue	30 min.	Stop or Go	(Note: Welles praises Joe E. Brown on his 44th anniversary in show business. Dorothy Lamour and Rudy Vallee sing "Sunday, Monday, or Always". Cast: Joe E. Brown (host), Orson Welles, Jack Benny, Hedda Hopper, Dorothy Lamour, Matty Malneck and His Orchestra, Ted Meyers (announcer), Rudy Vallee.)	Yes	Yes			
December 10	NBC	30 min.	The University of Chicago Round Table		Yes	Yes			
December 15	AFRS	30 min.	G.I. Journal		Yes	Yes			
December 19	CBS	30 min.	This Is My Best	"The Plot to Overthrow Christmas" (Note: Cast: Ray Collins (Santa Claus), Orson Welles (Nero), John Brown (Devil), John McIntire, Bernard Katz (composer, conductor), Owen James (announcer).)	Yes	Yes			
December 24	Blue	60 min.	Philco Radio Hall of Fame	"The Happy Prince" (Note: Cast: Orson Welles, Bing Crosby.)	Yes	Yes			
December 25	AFRS	30 min.	AFRS Presents	"The Happy Prince" (Note: Abbreviated Armed Forces Radio Service version of the December 24 broadcast of "The Happy Prince".)	Yes	Yes			
December 30	AFRS	30 min.	Command Performance	(Note: Guests: Orson Welles, Ernst Lubitsch, Greer Garson, Santa Anna Swing Wing, John Brown.)		Yes			

== 1945 ==
Date	Network	Length	Series	Details	Surviving recording	Involvement			
Date	Network	Length	Series	Details	Surviving recording	Actor	Director	Producer	Writer
January 28	CBS	60 min.	The Kate Smith Show			Yes			
January 29–30	NYC radio	30 min.	The Suspect	Transcribed dramatization promoting the film (Note: Broadcasting: "Universal Pictures Co., New York has prepared a full half-hour transcribed dramatization of The Suspect, for placement on stations in conjunction with local openings of the film. Orson Welles takes the lead part played by Charles Laughton in the film. Disc was sponsored commercially on six New York stations … Records were cut by WOR Recording, New York. Agency is J. Walter Thompson Co., New York." Aired on WEAF, WJZ, WMCA, WNEW, WOR and WQXR.)		Yes			
March 13	CBS	30 min.	This Is My Best	"Heart of Darkness" (Note: Welles takes over as producer, director and star of this series broadcast live from Hollywood before a studio audience. His debut is an adaptation of the Joseph Conrad novella. Cast: Orson Welles (Marlow, Kurtz), Bernard Katz (composer, conductor).)	Yes	Yes	Yes	Yes	Yes
March 20	CBS	30 min.	This Is My Best	"Miss Dilly Says No" (Note: Adaptation of the fable by Theodore Pratt. Cast: Orson Welles (Producer), Ann Sothern (Miss Dilly), Rita Hayworth (Miss Dilly's friend), Francis X. Bushman (Mr. Flagstone), Bernard Katz (composer), Robert Tallman (adaptor), John McIntire (announcer).)	Yes	Yes	Yes	Yes	
March 26	CBS	60 min.	Lux Radio Theatre	"A Tale of Two Cities" (Note: Cast: Orson Welles (Sydney Carton), Rosemary De Camp (Lucie Manette), Dennis Greene (Charles Darnay), Verna Felton (Madame DeFarge), Frank Craven (host), Denis Green, Griff Barnett, Norman Field, Ken Christy (doubles), Charles Seel, Lurene Tuttle, Ferdinand Munier (doubles), Jay Novello (doubles), Robert Regent (doubles), Eric Snowden (doubles), Boyd Davis, Paul McVey, Alec Harford, Thomas Mills, Regina Wallace, Virginia Gordon, Herb Lytton, Louis Silvers (music director), John Milton Kennedy (announcer), Fred MacKaye (director), Sanford Barnett (adaptor), Charlie Forsyth (sound effects).)	Yes	Yes			
March 27	CBS	30 min.	This Is My Best	"Snow White and the Seven Dwarfs" (Note: The Brothers Grimm tale as adapted by Walt Disney, including songs from the film. Cast: Jane Powell (Snow White), Jeanette Nolan (Wicked Queen), Bill Daves (Prince Charming), John McIntire (Mirror). Welles states that the program was chosen for broadcast overseas and is dedicated to his daughter Christopher on her seventh birthday.)	Yes	Yes	Yes	Yes	
April 3	CBS	30 min.	This Is My Best	"The Diamond as Big as the Ritz" (Note: Cast: Orson Welles (narrator, Braddock Washington), David Ellis (John T. Unger), Sheila Ryan (Kismine Washington).)	Yes	Yes	Yes	Yes	
April 10	CBS	30 min.	This Is My Best	"The Master of Ballantrae" (Note: Cast: Orson Welles, Agnes Moorehead, Ray Collins, Alan Napier.)	Yes	Yes	Yes	Yes	
April 12	Blue		Memorial tribute to FDR	Special broadcast on the evening of Franklin D. Roosevelt's death (Note: Broadcasting: "Thursday night following the death of the President, the Blue-ABC network mobilized its entire executive staff to participate with national leaders in a series of tributes. Among those appearing were Marshall Field, publisher; Orson Welles, writer, producer and actor; Edward J. Noble, chairman of the Blue-ABC and Undersecretary of Commerce under the late President; Justice Byrnes; Robert Hannegan, chairman of the Democratic National Committee; numerous congressional and labor leaders, as well as representatives of the Supreme Court and of the clergy. All commercial announcements were cancelled and numerous outstanding sponsored programs likewise were put aside. Sir Thomas Beecham, recently arrived in this country, presented one of the first memorial programs in the Blue-ABC series. It was accompanied by comments by Raymond Moley, Rabbi Wise, Rev. Mr. Fosdick and Walter Winchell. Among the outstanding programs which attracted wide attention was a special tribute delivered by Orson Welles." Welles spoke at 10:10 p.m. EWT, from Hollywood: "He has no need for homage and we who loved him have no time for tears … Our fighting sons and brothers cannot pause tonight to mark the death of him whose name will be given to the age we live in … We cannot do him reverence this April twelfth. There will be time for tears only when his work is done.")		Yes			Yes
April 13	CBS		Eulogy for FDR	Special broadcast on the death of Franklin D. Roosevelt (Note: Orson Welles: "We must move on beyond mere death to that free world which was the hope and labor of his life.")		Yes			Yes
April 17	CBS	30 min.	This Is My Best	"I Will Not Go Back" (Note: An original radio drama by Milton Geiger, dedicated to FDR and the future of America on the eve of the United Nations Conference on International Organization. Cast: Orson Welles, Joan Lorring.)	Yes	Yes	Yes	Yes	
April 24	CBS	30 min.	This Is My Best	"Anything Can Happen" (Note: Adaptation of the best-selling biographical novel by Helen and George Papashvily. Cast: Orson Welles, Edgar Barrier, Konstantin Shayne, Peg La Centra.)	Yes	Yes	Yes	Yes	
April 25	Blue	30 min.	Significance of the UN Conference on International Organization	Dramatic program by Ben Hecht presented on opening day (Note: Blue-ABC: "Perhaps better than any radio writer he can bring our people the true meaning of the conference." Cast: Orson Welles (narrator), Harold Stassen.)		Yes			
April 29	Blue	30 min.	Orson Welles Peace Conference Forum	(Note: Welles moderates this weekly program of analysis and commentary about the UN Conference on International Organization. Presented at the San Francisco Civic Auditorium by the Free World Association, Americans United and the American Broadcasting Company.)		Yes			
May 6	Blue	30 min.	Orson Welles Peace Conference Forum			Yes			
May 7			V-E Day Program	(Note: Orson Welles is among the speakers)		Yes			
May 13	Blue	30 min.	Orson Welles Peace Conference Forum			Yes			
May 17	AFRS	30 min.	Command Performance	"The Mercury Wonder Show" (Note: Cast: Orson Welles, Peggy Lee ("You Was Right, Baby"), Larry Adler ("Blues in the Night"), The King Sisters ("Stuff Like That There"), Alfred Drake ("Stan' Up and Fight"), Danny Thomas (postman Jerry Dingle), Bob Jellison, Edward Marr, Ken Carpenter (announcer).)	Yes	Yes			
May 20	Blue	30 min.	Orson Welles Peace Conference Forum			Yes			
May 27	Blue	30 min.	Orson Welles Peace Conference Forum			Yes			
June 3	Blue	30 min.	Orson Welles Peace Conference Forum			Yes			
June 10	Blue	30 min.	Orson Welles Peace Conference Forum	(Note: This was Welles's last event in the series; Henry Cassidy conducted the June 17 forum due to his illness.)		Yes			
July 17	NBC	30 min.	French Press: The Liberation of Paris	(Note: Welles narrates this documentary about French underground radio during Nazi Occupation.)	Yes	Yes			
July 24	CBS	30 min.	Columbia Presents Corwin	"New York: A Tapestry for Radio" (Note: Cast: Orson Welles, Norman Corwin (writer, director, producer).)	Yes	Yes			
July 26	AFRS	30 min.	Command Performance	(Note: Cast: Orson Welles (emcee), Ken Carpenter (announcer), Donna Dae ("On the Sunny Side of the Street"), Theodora Lynch, Sgt. Herb Shriner, Larry Stevens.)	Yes	Yes			
August 9	Blue	30 min.	America's Town Meeting of the Air	"What Does the British Election Mean to Us?" (Note: Cast: George V. Denny Jr. (moderator), Orson Welles, Manchester Boddy, others; published subsequently as a pamphlet.)	Yes	Yes			
August 14	CBS	15 min.	Columbia Presents Corwin	"Fourteen August" (Note: Cast: Orson Welles, Norman Corwin (writer, director, producer).)	Yes	Yes			
August 14	AFRS	30 min.	Command Performance	(Note: Cast: Orson Welles, Ernst Lubitsch, Jack Benny, Greer Garson, Ken Carpenter.)		Yes			
August 15	AFRS	90 min.	Command Performance	"Victory Extra" (Note: Cast: Orson Welles, Lucille Ball, Lionel Barrymore, Janet Blair, Ken Carpenter (announcer), Claudette Colbert, Ronald Colman, Bing Crosby (emcee), Bette Davis, Marlene Dietrich, Jimmy Durante, Ed Gardner, Greer Garson, Cary Grant, Rita Hayworth, Lena Horne, Jose Iturbi, Danny Kaye, The King Sisters, Diana Lewis, Thomas Lewis (Commandant of the AFRS), Herbert Marshall, Marilyn Maxwell, Johnny Mercer, Burgess Meredith, Carmen Miranda, Robert Montgomery, William Powell, Edward G. Robinson, Lina Romay, Dinah Shore, Risë Stevens ("Ave Maria"), Ginny Simms, Frank Sinatra, Martha Wilkerson, Meredith Willson (conductor), Harry Von Zell, Loretta Young, others.)	Yes	Yes			
August 19	CBS	30 min.	Columbia Presents Corwin	"God and Uranium" (Note: Cast: Orson Welles, Olivia de Havilland, Norman Corwin (writer, director, producer).)	Yes	Yes			
September 16	ABC	15 min.	Orson Welles Commentaries	(Note: Welles begins a weekly series of social and political commentary and readings, sponsored by Lear Radios.)	Yes	Yes	Yes	Yes	Yes
September 18	AFRS	30 min.	Tribute to FDR	Rebroadcast of Welles's tribute to Franklin D. Roosevelt (Note: "It begins with Welles reading the 23rd Psalm followed by an unidentified soprano singing Ave Maria. Home on the Range is sung by an unidentified male singer. Welles reads from the Bible and speaks about FDR. He reads from an FDR speech and speaks in tribute to him. Ends with two hymns." (WorldCat))	Yes	Yes			Yes
September 23	ABC	15 min.	Orson Welles Commentaries	(Note: Welles tells The Story of Bonito, the Bull by Robert J. Flaherty, the only part of the unfinished omnibus film It's All True that he ever presented to an audience.)	Yes	Yes	Yes	Yes	Yes
September 29	Pool	150 min.	The Victory Chest Extra	(Note: The launching of the National Victory War Chest Fund, broadcast from the Hollywood Bowl, includes a 15-minute patriotic reading by Orson Welles, "What Price Victory?" Cast: Orson Welles (host), Gene Autry, Lionel Barrymore, Margaret Brayton, Eddie Cantor, Jack Carson, Tommy Cook, Jerry Colonna, The Ken Darby Chorus, Hal Gerard, Bob Hope, Bill Johnson, William Halsey Jr., Kay Kyser, Frances Langford, Arch Oboler, Edward G. Robinson, Tony Romano, Dinah Shore, Frank Sinatra, Lee Sweetland, Earl Warren, Carlton E. Morse (producer, director), James Powell (announcer), Meredith Willson (conductor).)	Yes	Yes			
September 30	ABC	15 min.	Orson Welles Commentaries		Yes	Yes	Yes	Yes	Yes
October 7	ABC	15 min.	Orson Welles Commentaries		Yes	Yes	Yes	Yes	Yes
October 14	ABC	15 min.	Orson Welles Commentaries		Yes	Yes	Yes	Yes	Yes
October 21	ABC	15 min.	Orson Welles Commentaries		Yes	Yes	Yes	Yes	Yes
October 21	CBS	30 min.	Request Performance	(Note: Welles takes the audience on "A Rocket Trip to the Moon" in this spinoff of Command Performance, produced by the Masquers Club of Hollywood. Cast: Orson Welles (host), Johnny Mercer ("On the Atchison, Topeka and the Santa Fe"), Eddie Bracken, Ken Christy, Knox Manning, Virginia O'Brien, Leith Stevens (composer, conductor), William N. Robson (director).)	Yes	Yes			
October 28	ABC	15 min.	Orson Welles Commentaries		Yes	Yes	Yes	Yes	Yes
November 4	ABC	15 min.	Orson Welles Commentaries	(Note: Welles discusses the ousting of Brazilian president Getúlio Vargas.)	Yes	Yes	Yes	Yes	Yes
November 11	ABC	15 min.	Orson Welles Commentaries	(Note: Welles reads a letter from Louis Armstrong, recounting his early days, while Barney Bigard, Zutty Singleton, Fred Washington and others play "Perdido Street Blues".)	Yes	Yes	Yes	Yes	Yes
November 18	ABC	15 min.	Orson Welles Commentaries		Yes	Yes	Yes	Yes	Yes
November 25	ABC	15 min.	Orson Welles Commentaries		Yes	Yes	Yes	Yes	Yes
December 2	ABC	15 min.	Orson Welles Commentaries		Yes	Yes	Yes	Yes	Yes
December 9	ABC	15 min.	Orson Welles Commentaries	(Note: Broadcast from the U. S. Naval Training and Distribution Center, Treasure Island, San Francisco, California, via KGO. Featuring Commodore Robert W. Cary, USN, commander of the center. The three theatre complexes are named to honor three World War II heroes killed in action: John Basilone (Theatre Three), Edward O'Hare (Theatre Two) and Doris Miller (Theatre One), the first African American to be awarded the Navy Cross. Includes a conversation on race prejudice with Miller's father, Connery Miller, via WACO in Waco, Texas.)	Yes	Yes	Yes	Yes	Yes
December 16	ABC	15 min.	Orson Welles Commentaries		Yes	Yes	Yes	Yes	Yes
December 16	ABC	30 min.	World Christmas Festival	"The Nativity According to St. Luke"		Yes			
December 23	ABC	15 min.	Orson Welles Commentaries		Yes	Yes	Yes	Yes	Yes
December 30	ABC	15 min.	Orson Welles Commentaries		Yes	Yes	Yes	Yes	Yes
1945	Mutual	30 min.	Exploring the Unknown	"The Battle Never Ends" (Note: Man's struggle against plagues. Cast: Orson Welles, Sherman H. Dryer (producer).)		Yes			

== 1946 ==
Date	Network	Length	Series	Details	Surviving recording	Involvement			
Date	Network	Length	Series	Details	Surviving recording	Actor	Director	Producer	Writer
January 6	ABC	15 min.	Orson Welles Commentaries		Yes	Yes	Yes	Yes	Yes
January 13	ABC	15 min.	Orson Welles Commentaries		Yes	Yes	Yes	Yes	Yes
January 16	ABC	60 min.	Esquire's 1946 All-American Jazz Band Concert	(Note: Cast: Orson Welles (emcee), Nat King Cole Trio, Duke Ellington and His Orchestra, Woody Herman and His Orchestra.)	Yes	Yes			
January 20	ABC	15 min.	Orson Welles Commentaries		Yes	Yes	Yes	Yes	Yes
January 27	ABC	15 min.	Orson Welles Commentaries		Yes	Yes	Yes	Yes	Yes
February 3	ABC	15 min.	Orson Welles Commentaries		Yes	Yes	Yes	Yes	Yes
February 10	ABC	15 min.	Orson Welles Commentaries		Yes	Yes	Yes	Yes	Yes
February 17	ABC	15 min.	Orson Welles Commentaries		Yes	Yes	Yes	Yes	Yes
February 24	ABC	15 min.	Orson Welles Commentaries		Yes	Yes	Yes	Yes	Yes
March 1	CBS	30 min.	The Danny Kaye Show	(Note: Cast: Danny Kaye, Orson Welles, Dick Joy (announcer), Butterfly McQueen, Dave Terry and His Orchestra, Georgia Gibbs.)	Yes	Yes			
March 3	ABC	15 min.	Orson Welles Commentaries		Yes	Yes	Yes	Yes	Yes
March 3	NBC	30 min.	The Fred Allen Show	Parody of Les Misérables (Note: Cast: Fred Allen, Orson Welles, The De Marco Sisters, Portland Hoffa, Minerva Pious, Alan Reed, Parker Fennelly, Kenny Delmar, Al Goodman and His Orchestra.)	Yes	Yes			
March 10	ABC	15 min.	Orson Welles Commentaries		Yes	Yes	Yes	Yes	Yes
March 15	CBS	60 min.	The Kate Smith Show			Yes			
March 17	ABC	15 min.	Orson Welles Commentaries		Yes	Yes	Yes	Yes	Yes
March 20	CBS	30 min.	The Adventures of Ellery Queen	"The Adventure of the Man Who Waited" (Note: Cast: Orson Welles (Guest Armchair Detective), Sydney Smith, Marion Shockley, Ted de Corsia.)		Yes			
March 24	ABC	15 min.	Orson Welles Commentaries		Yes	Yes	Yes	Yes	Yes
March 31	CBS	30 min.	The Radio Reader's Digest	"Back for Christmas"	Yes	Yes			
March 31	ABC	15 min.	Orson Welles Commentaries		Yes	Yes	Yes	Yes	Yes
April 7	ABC	15 min.	Orson Welles Commentaries		Yes	Yes	Yes	Yes	Yes
April 14	ABC	15 min.	Orson Welles Commentaries		Yes	Yes	Yes	Yes	Yes
April 16	CBS	30 min.	Inner Sanctum Mysteries	"The Lonely Hearts Killer"		Yes			
April 21	ABC	15 min.	Orson Welles Commentaries		Yes	Yes	Yes	Yes	Yes
April 28	ABC	15 min.	Orson Welles Commentaries		Yes	Yes	Yes	Yes	Yes
May 5	ABC	15 min.	Orson Welles Commentaries		Yes	Yes	Yes	Yes	Yes
May 12	ABC	15 min.	Orson Welles Commentaries	(Note: Due to illness, Welles is replaced by George Hays.)	Yes		Yes	Yes	Yes
May 19	ABC	15 min.	Orson Welles Commentaries		Yes	Yes	Yes	Yes	Yes
May 26	ABC	15 min.	Orson Welles Commentaries		Yes	Yes	Yes	Yes	Yes
June 2	ABC	15 min.	Orson Welles Commentaries		Yes	Yes	Yes	Yes	Yes
June 7	CBS	30 min.	The Mercury Summer Theatre of the Air	"Around the World in Eighty Days" (Note: Excerpts of Welles's Broadway musical extravanganza, with songs by Cole Porter and Noël Coward. Cast: Orson Welles (Fix), Arthur Margetson (Phileas Fogg), Larry Laurence (Passepartout), Mary Healy (Princess Aouda), Julie Warren (Molly Muggins).)	Yes	Yes	Yes	Yes	Yes
June 9	ABC	15 min.	Orson Welles Commentaries		Yes	Yes	Yes	Yes	Yes
June 10	NBC	45 min.	Mary Margaret McBride	Interview		Yes			
June 14	CBS	30 min.	The Mercury Summer Theatre of the Air	"The Count of Monte Cristo" (Note: Cast: Orson Welles (Edmond Dantès), Julie Warren (Mercédès); with Stefan Schnabel, Guy Spaull, Brainerd Duffield.)	Yes	Yes	Yes	Yes	Yes
June 16	ABC	15 min.	Orson Welles Commentaries		Yes	Yes	Yes	Yes	Yes
June 21	CBS	30 min.	The Mercury Summer Theatre of the Air	"The Hitch-Hiker" (Note: Cast: Orson Welles, Alice Frost)	Yes	Yes	Yes	Yes	Yes
June 23	ABC	15 min.	Orson Welles Commentaries	(Note: Welles calls for protest on the end of the Office of Price Administration.)	Yes	Yes	Yes	Yes	Yes
June 28	CBS	30 min.	The Mercury Summer Theatre of the Air	"Jane Eyre" (Note: "With a special score composed and conducted by that pillar of the Mercury, Bernard Herrmann" (Orson Welles). Cast: Orson Welles (Rochester), Alice Frost (Jane Eyre), Guy Spaull, Stefan Schnabel, Mary Healy, Abby Lewis.)	Yes	Yes	Yes	Yes	Yes
June 30	ABC	15 min.	Orson Welles Commentaries	(Note: Welles protests the end of OPA price controls and the imminent atomic test at Bikini Atoll—with Rita Hayworth's image on the A-bomb nicknamed "Gilda".)	Yes	Yes	Yes	Yes	Yes
July 5	CBS	30 min.	The Mercury Summer Theatre of the Air	"A Passenger to Bali" (Note: Adaptation of the short novel by Ellis St. Joseph. Cast: Orson Welles (Reverend Dr. Ralph Walkes), Everett Sloane (Capt. English). As he ends the program, Welles announces that the following week's story will be an adaptation of his next film, The Stranger. Edward G. Robinson and Loretta Young were to be featured, but the program was not realized.)	Yes	Yes	Yes	Yes	Yes
July 7	ABC	15 min.	Orson Welles Commentaries	(Note: Lear Radios does not renew its sponsorship option due to low audience numbers, but ABC continues the program. Welles's pay is cut from $1,700 to $50 per show.)	Yes	Yes	Yes	Yes	Yes
July 12	CBS	30 min.	The Mercury Summer Theatre of the Air	"The Search for Henri Le Fevre" (Note: An original radio play by Louise Fletcher. Cast: Orson Welles, Mercedes McCambridge, Julie Warren, Brainerd Duffield.)	Yes	Yes	Yes	Yes	Yes
July 14	ABC	15 min.	Orson Welles Commentaries		Yes	Yes	Yes	Yes	Yes
July 19	CBS	30 min.	The Mercury Summer Theatre of the Air	"Life With Adam" (Note: Comic radio play by Hugh Kemp, originally produced for Stage 46 in Toronto by Andrew Allen. Cast: Orson Welles (host), Fletcher Markle (Adam Barneycastle), Grace Mathews (Eve), John Drainie (Chester), Betty Garde (Jenkins), Hedley Rainie (Waiter, Producer, others); with Patricia Loudry, Mercedes McCambridge.)	Yes	Yes	Yes	Yes	Yes
July 21	ABC	15 min.	Orson Welles Commentaries	(Note: Don Hollenbeck substitutes for Welles, who is ill. Topics include compromise on OPA rent and price controls, and unrest in Bolivia.)	Yes	Yes	Yes	Yes	Yes
July 26	CBS	30 min.	The Mercury Summer Theatre of the Air	"The Moat Farm Murder" (Note: A radio documentary by Norman Corwin. Cast: Orson Welles (Dougal), Mercedes McCambridge (Cecile).)	Yes	Yes	Yes	Yes	Yes
July 28	ABC	15 min.	Orson Welles Commentaries	First episode about the Isaac Woodard case (Note: Welles reads an affidavit sent to him by the NAACP. It is signed by Isaac Woodard, a black veteran who was beaten and blinded by South Carolina police hours after he had been honorably discharged from the U.S. Army. Welles promises to identify the officer responsible and makes the case a major focus of his weekly show. Bret Wood: "Welles took up the cause, having always been outspoken on issues of racism and turned the event into a scathing attack on postwar racism and ingratitude".)	Yes	Yes	Yes	Yes	Yes
August 2	CBS	30 min.	The Mercury Summer Theatre of the Air	"The Golden Honeymoon" (Note: A love story by Ring Lardner. Welles reads selections from Romeo and Juliet. Cast: Julie Warren, Brainerd Duffield, Mercedes McCambridge, Mary Healy, Ted Osborne, Stefan Schnabel, Santos Ortega.)	Yes	Yes	Yes	Yes	Yes
August 4	ABC	15 min.	Orson Welles Commentaries	Second episode about the Isaac Woodard case	Yes	Yes	Yes	Yes	Yes
August 9	CBS	30 min.	The Mercury Summer Theatre of the Air	"Hell on Ice" (Note: An adaptation of Edward Ellsberg's book about the USS Jeannette. Cast: Orson Welles, John Brown, Elliott Reid, Byron Kane, Norman Field, Earle Ross, Lurene Tuttle.)	Yes	Yes	Yes	Yes	Yes
August 11	ABC	15 min.	Orson Welles Commentaries	Third episode about the Isaac Woodard case	Yes	Yes	Yes	Yes	Yes
August 16	CBS	30 min.	The Mercury Summer Theatre of the Air	"Abednego the Slave" (Note: An original radio play by Orson Welles and John Tucker Battle. Cast: Orson Welles, Norman Field, Earle Ross, Joe Granby, Barbara Jean Wong, Carl Frank, Byron Kane, John Brown, William Johnstone, Elliott Reid, William Alland.)	Yes	Yes	Yes	Yes	Yes
August 18	ABC	15 min.	Orson Welles Commentaries	Fourth episode about the Isaac Woodard case	Yes	Yes	Yes	Yes	Yes
August 23	CBS	30 min.	The Mercury Summer Theatre of the Air	"I'm a Fool" / "The Tell-Tale Heart" (Note: Adaptations of short stories by Sherwood Anderson and Edgar Allan Poe. Cast: Orson Welles, William Alland, Joe Granby, Elliott Reid, Norman Field, Carl Frank, others.)	Yes	Yes	Yes	Yes	Yes
August 25	ABC	15 min.	Orson Welles Commentaries	Fifth and last episode about the Isaac Woodard case (Note: Museum of Broadcasting: "The NAACP felt that these broadcasts did more than anything else to prompt the Justice Department to act on the case".)	Yes	Yes	Yes	Yes	Yes
August 30	CBS	30 min.	The Mercury Summer Theatre of the Air	"Moby Dick" (Note: Brainerd Duffield's adaptation of the novel by Herman Melville. Cast: Orson Welles (Ahab), William Alland, Byron Kane, John Brown, Earle Ross, Elliott Reid.)	Yes	Yes	Yes	Yes	Yes
September 1	ABC	15 min.	Orson Welles Commentaries	(Note: Welles is told in September that ABC is unable to continue his sustained program after the October 6 episode.)	Yes	Yes	Yes	Yes	Yes
September 6	CBS	30 min.	The Mercury Summer Theatre of the Air	"The Apple Tree" (Note: Cast: Orson Welles, Norman Field, Mary Lansing, Lurene Tuttle, Jerry Farber, others.)	Yes	Yes	Yes	Yes	Yes
September 8	ABC	15 min.	Orson Welles Commentaries		Yes	Yes	Yes	Yes	Yes
September 13	CBS	30 min.	The Mercury Summer Theatre of the Air	"King Lear" (Note: Cast: Orson Welles (King Lear), John Brown (Narrator); with Agnes Moorehead, Edgar Barrier, William Alland, Mary Lansing. Welles reads "Cynara", a poem by Ernest Dowson, to conclude the Mercury Summer Theatre series.)	Yes	Yes	Yes	Yes	Yes
September 15	ABC	15 min.	Orson Welles Commentaries		Yes	Yes	Yes	Yes	Yes
September 22	ABC	15 min.	Orson Welles Commentaries		Yes	Yes	Yes	Yes	Yes
September 29	ABC	15 min.	Orson Welles Commentaries		Yes	Yes	Yes	Yes	Yes
October 6	ABC	15 min.	Orson Welles Commentaries	Last show of the series Last of Welles's own radio shows	Yes	Yes	Yes	Yes	Yes

== 1947 ==
Date	Network	Length	Series	Details	Surviving recording	Involvement			
Date	Network	Length	Series	Details	Surviving recording	Actor	Director	Producer	Writer
May 29	AFRS	60 min.	Command Performance	"Anniversary Program" (Note: Fifth anniversary of the Armed Forces Radio Service. Cast: Ken Carpenter (announcer), Fred Allen, Robert Anders (Secretary Of War), Eddie Anderson, Lionel Barrymore (emcee), Jack Benny, J. Lawton Collins (Lieutenant General), Bing Crosby, Jimmy Durante, Nelson Eddy, Clark Gable, Judy Garland, Greer Garson, Bill Goodwin, Peter Lind Hayes, Portland Hoffa, Danny Kaye, Ernst Lubitsch, Paul Lukas, Lauritz Melchior, George Murphy, Lina Romay, Dinah Shore, Ginny Simms, Frank Sinatra, Harry Von Zell, Orson Welles, Don Wilson.)	Yes	Yes			

== 1948 ==
Date	Network	Length	Series	Details	Surviving recording	Involvement			
Date	Network	Length	Series	Details	Surviving recording	Actor	Director	Producer	Writer
October 13	AFRS	30 min.	Mail Call	Assembled program (Note: Welles's contribution was recorded before he left the U.S. for Europe after the filming of Macbeth was completed in July 1947. Cast: Orson Welles (a two-minute "commercial"), The King Sisters ("Isle of Capri"), Betty Grable ("I Can't Begin to Tell You"), Danny Kaye, Gregory Ratoff, Peggy Knudsen (emcee), Ken Niles (announcer).)	Yes	Yes			

== 1950 ==
Date	Network	Length	Series	Details	Surviving recording	Involvement			
Date	Network	Length	Series	Details	Surviving recording	Actor	Director	Producer	Writer
October 15	WNBC	60 min.	This Is the U.N.: Its Actual Voices	(Note: Recordings of United Nations highlights, from the founding conference in San Francisco to the Korean debate, introduced and narrated by Dr. Benjamin A. Cohen, UN Assistant Secretary General. Cast: Franchot Tone (narrator), Franklin Roosevelt, Harry Truman, Anthony Eden, Edward Stitinius, V. M. Molotov (translator), Orson Welles, Trygve Lie, Bernard Baruch, Dean Acheson, Jawaharlal Nehru, Andrei Vishinsky, Albert Einstein, Ralph Bunche, Clement Attlee, Fiorello La Guardia, Andrei Gromyko, Lester Pearson, Jan Masaryk, Ernest Bevin, Chaim Weitzman, George Marshall, William MacKenzie-King, Eleanor Roosevelt, Benjamin Cohen, Eleanor Gardner (writer, producer, director), Robert Lewis Shayon (director), Wayne Howell (announcer), Lee Jones (producer), Mavor Moore (director).)	Yes	Yes			

== 1951–1952 ==
Date	Network	Length	Series	Details	Surviving recording	Involvement			
Date	Network	Length	Series	Details	Surviving recording	Actor	Director	Producer	Writer
1951–1952	Synd	30 min.	The Adventures of Harry Lime	"Art is Long and Lime is Fleeting" (Note: A total of 52 shows were produced for this series, also known as The Third Man: The Lives of Harry Lime. Welles narrates this prequel series based on the character he portrayed in The Third Man (1949). Produced by Harry Alan Towers, directed by Tig Roe, zither music by Anton Karas. Recorded (beginning in March 1951) at IBC Studios, London. Episode titles are listed alphabetically: "Because the programs were recorded on tape for syndicated release (as opposed to live-performed syndicated line feeds), the programs were not broadcast on particular dates in specific order" (Bret Wood).)	Yes	Yes			
1951–1952	Synd	30 min.	The Adventures of Harry Lime	"Blackmail is a Nasty Word" (also known as "Givrolet")	Yes	Yes			Yes
1951–1952	Synd	30 min.	The Adventures of Harry Lime	"Blue Bride"	Yes	Yes			
1951–1952	Synd	30 min.	The Adventures of Harry Lime	"The Blue Caribou"	Yes	Yes			
1951–1952	Synd	30 min.	The Adventures of Harry Lime	"The Bohemian Star"	Yes	Yes			
1951–1952	Synd	30 min.	The Adventures of Harry Lime	"Casino Royale"	Yes	Yes			
1951–1952	Synd	30 min.	The Adventures of Harry Lime	"Cherchez la Gem"	Yes	Yes			
1951–1952	Synd	30 min.	The Adventures of Harry Lime	"Clay Pigeon"	Yes	Yes			
1951–1952	Synd	30 min.	The Adventures of Harry Lime	"Dark Enchantress"	Yes	Yes			
1951–1952	Synd	30 min.	The Adventures of Harry Lime	"The Dead Candidate" (also known as "Buzzo Gospel") (Note: Adapted for a satirical film treatment titled V.I.P. and subsequently, published as a novel, Une Grosse Légume.)	Yes	Yes			Yes
1951–1952	Synd	30 min.	The Adventures of Harry Lime	"Double Double Trouble" (also known as "Double Double Cross")	Yes	Yes			
1951–1952	Synd	30 min.	The Adventures of Harry Lime	"The Earl on Troubled Waters"	Yes	Yes			
1951–1952	Synd	30 min.	The Adventures of Harry Lime	"The Elusive Vermeer"	Yes	Yes			
1951–1952	Synd	30 min.	The Adventures of Harry Lime	"Every Frame Has a Silver Lining"	Yes	Yes			
1951–1952	Synd	30 min.	The Adventures of Harry Lime	"Faith, Lime and Charity"	Yes	Yes			
1951–1952	Synd	30 min.	The Adventures of Harry Lime	"Five-Thousand Pengoes and a Kiss"	Yes	Yes			
1951–1952	Synd	30 min.	The Adventures of Harry Lime	"Fool's Gold"	Yes	Yes			
1951–1952	Synd	30 min.	The Adventures of Harry Lime	"The Golden Fleece"	Yes	Yes			Yes
1951–1952	Synd	30 min.	The Adventures of Harry Lime	"Greek Meets Greek"	Yes	Yes			
1951–1952	Synd	30 min.	The Adventures of Harry Lime	"The Hard Way"	Yes	Yes			
1951–1952	Synd	30 min.	The Adventures of Harry Lime	"Harry Lime Joins the Circus"	Yes	Yes			
1951–1952	Synd	30 min.	The Adventures of Harry Lime	"Honeymoon"	Yes	Yes			
1951–1952	Synd	30 min.	The Adventures of Harry Lime	"Horse Play"	Yes	Yes			
1951–1952	Synd	30 min.	The Adventures of Harry Lime	"The Hyacinth Patrol"	Yes	Yes			
1951–1952	Synd	30 min.	The Adventures of Harry Lime	"In Pursuit of a Ghost"	Yes	Yes			
1951–1952	Synd	30 min.	The Adventures of Harry Lime	"It's a Knockout"	Yes	Yes			
1951–1952	Synd	30 min.	The Adventures of Harry Lime	"It's in the Bag"	Yes	Yes			Yes
1951–1952	Synd	30 min.	The Adventures of Harry Lime	"The Little One"	Yes	Yes			
1951–1952	Synd	30 min.	The Adventures of Harry Lime	"Love Affair"	Yes	Yes			
1951–1952	Synd	30 min.	The Adventures of Harry Lime	"Man of Mystery" (Note: Recorded in Paris. Welles later developed this story into the script for his film Mr. Arkadin.)	Yes	Yes			Yes
1951–1952	Synd	30 min.	The Adventures of Harry Lime	"Mexican Hat Trick"	Yes	Yes			
1951–1952	Synd	30 min.	The Adventures of Harry Lime	"Murder on the Riviera" (also known as "Cigarettes")	Yes	Yes			Yes
1951–1952	Synd	30 min.	The Adventures of Harry Lime	"New York, 1942" (also known as "Hand of Glory")	Yes	Yes			
1951–1952	Synd	30 min.	The Adventures of Harry Lime	"A Night in a Harem"	Yes	Yes			
1951–1952	Synd	30 min.	The Adventures of Harry Lime	"An Old Moorish Custom"	Yes	Yes			
1951–1952	Synd	30 min.	The Adventures of Harry Lime	"Operation Music Box"	Yes	Yes			Yes
1951–1952	Synd	30 min.	The Adventures of Harry Lime	"The Painted Smile"	Yes	Yes			
1951–1952	Synd	30 min.	The Adventures of Harry Lime	"Paris is Not the Same"	Yes	Yes			
1951–1952	Synd	30 min.	The Adventures of Harry Lime	"The Pearls of Bohemia"	Yes	Yes			
1951–1952	Synd	30 min.	The Adventures of Harry Lime	"Pleasure Before Business"	Yes	Yes			
1951–1952	Synd	30 min.	The Adventures of Harry Lime	"The Professor Regrets"	Yes	Yes			
1951–1952	Synd	30 min.	The Adventures of Harry Lime	"Rogue's Holiday"	Yes	Yes			
1951–1952	Synd	30 min.	The Adventures of Harry Lime	"The Secret of Making Gold"	Yes	Yes			
1951–1952	Synd	30 min.	The Adventures of Harry Lime	"See Naples and Live"	Yes	Yes			
1951–1952	Synd	30 min.	The Adventures of Harry Lime	"Suzie's Cue"	Yes	Yes			
1951–1952	Synd	30 min.	The Adventures of Harry Lime	"The Third Woman"	Yes	Yes			
1951–1952	Synd	30 min.	The Adventures of Harry Lime	"Three Farthings for Your Thoughts"	Yes	Yes			
1951–1952	Synd	30 min.	The Adventures of Harry Lime	"A Ticket to Tangier"	Yes	Yes			Yes
1951–1952	Synd	30 min.	The Adventures of Harry Lime	"Too Many Crooks"	Yes	Yes			Yes
1951–1952	Synd	30 min.	The Adventures of Harry Lime	"Turnabout is Fair Play"	Yes	Yes			
1951–1952	Synd	30 min.	The Adventures of Harry Lime	"Two Is Company"	Yes	Yes			Yes
1951–1952	Synd	30 min.	The Adventures of Harry Lime	"Violets Sweet Violets"	Yes	Yes			
1951–1952	Synd	30 min.	The Adventures of Harry Lime	"Vive la Chance"	Yes	Yes			
1951–1952	Synd	30 min.	The Adventures of Harry Lime	"Voodoo"	Yes	Yes			
1951–1952	Synd	30 min.	The Adventures of Harry Lime	"Work of Art"	Yes	Yes			
1951–1952	Synd	30 min.	The Black Museum	"The Bathtub" (Note: A total of 52 shows were produced for this series based on famous cases from the archives of Scotland Yard. Produced by Harry Alan Towers, directed by Tig Roe; recorded in London beginning in 1951. Episode titles are listed alphabetically: "Because the programs were recorded on tape for syndicated release (as opposed to live-performed syndicated line feeds), the programs were not broadcast on particular dates in specific order" (Bret Wood).)	Yes	Yes			
1951–1952	Synd	30 min.	The Black Museum	"The Bedsheet" (also known as "The Spotted Bedsheet")	Yes	Yes			
1951–1952	Synd	30 min.	The Black Museum	"The Blue .22" (also known as "The 22 Caliber Pistol")	Yes	Yes			
1951–1952	Synd	30 min.	The Black Museum	"The Brass Button"	Yes	Yes			
1951–1952	Synd	30 min.	The Black Museum	"The Brickbat"	Yes	Yes			
1951–1952	Synd	30 min.	The Black Museum	"The Canvas Bag"	Yes	Yes			
1951–1952	Synd	30 min.	The Black Museum	"The Canvas Shopping Bag" (also known as "The Shopping Bag")	Yes	Yes			
1951–1952	Synd	30 min.	The Black Museum	"The Car Tyre"	Yes	Yes			
1951–1952	Synd	30 min.	The Black Museum	"The Chain" (also known as "A Piece of Iron Chain")	Yes	Yes			
1951–1952	Synd	30 min.	The Black Museum	"The Champagne Glass"	Yes	Yes			
1951–1952	Synd	30 min.	The Black Museum	"A Dictionary"	Yes	Yes			
1951–1952	Synd	30 min.	The Black Museum	"Four Small Bottles"	Yes	Yes			
1951–1952	Synd	30 min.	The Black Museum	"The Gladstone Bag"	Yes	Yes			
1951–1952	Synd	30 min.	The Black Museum	"Glass Shards"	Yes	Yes			
1951–1952	Synd	30 min.	The Black Museum	"The Hammer"	Yes	Yes			
1951–1952	Synd	30 min.	The Black Museum	"The Hammerhead"	Yes	Yes			
1951–1952	Synd	30 min.	The Black Museum	"The Jack Handle"	Yes	Yes			
1951–1952	Synd	30 min.	The Black Museum	"A Jar of Acid"	Yes	Yes			
1951–1952	Synd	30 min.	The Black Museum	"The Key"	Yes	Yes			
1951–1952	Synd	30 min.	The Black Museum	"The Khaki Handkerchief"	Yes	Yes			
1951–1952	Synd	30 min.	The Black Museum	"Kilroy Was Here" (also known as "The Notes")	Yes	Yes			
1951–1952	Synd	30 min.	The Black Museum	"A Lady's Shoe"	Yes	Yes			
1951–1952	Synd	30 min.	The Black Museum	"The Leather Bag"	Yes	Yes			
1951–1952	Synd	30 min.	The Black Museum	"The Letter"	Yes	Yes			
1951–1952	Synd	30 min.	The Black Museum	"The Mallet" (also known as "The Wooden Mallet", "The Old Wooden Mallet")	Yes	Yes			
1951–1952	Synd	30 min.	The Black Museum	"Mandolin Strings"	Yes	Yes			
1951–1952	Synd	30 min.	The Black Museum	"Meat Juice"	Yes	Yes			
1951–1952	Synd	30 min.	The Black Museum	"The Open End Wrench"	Yes	Yes			
1951–1952	Synd	30 min.	The Black Museum	"A Pair of Spectacles"	Yes	Yes			
1951–1952	Synd	30 min.	The Black Museum	"The Pink Powder Puff"	Yes	Yes			
1951–1952	Synd	30 min.	The Black Museum	"The Prescription"	Yes	Yes			
1951–1952	Synd	30 min.	The Black Museum	"The Raincoat"	Yes	Yes			
1951–1952	Synd	30 min.	The Black Museum	"The Receipt"	Yes	Yes			
1951–1952	Synd	30 min.	The Black Museum	"The Sashcord"	Yes	Yes			
1951–1952	Synd	30 min.	The Black Museum	"The Scarf"	Yes	Yes			
1951–1952	Synd	30 min.	The Black Museum	"The Service Card"	Yes	Yes			
1951–1952	Synd	30 min.	The Black Museum	"The Sheath Knife"	Yes	Yes			
1951–1952	Synd	30 min.	The Black Museum	"The Shilling"	Yes	Yes			
1951–1952	Synd	30 min.	The Black Museum	"The Silencer"	Yes	Yes			
1951–1952	Synd	30 min.	The Black Museum	"The Sleeveless, Unstitched Baby Jacket" (also known as "The Wool Jacket")	Yes	Yes			
1951–1952	Synd	30 min.	The Black Museum	"The Small White Boxes"	Yes	Yes			
1951–1952	Synd	30 min.	The Black Museum	"The Straight Razor"	Yes	Yes			
1951–1952	Synd	30 min.	The Black Museum	"The Tan Shoe"	Yes	Yes			
1951–1952	Synd	30 min.	The Black Museum	"The Telegram"	Yes	Yes			
1951–1952	Synd	30 min.	The Black Museum	"The Tin of Weed Killer"	Yes	Yes			
1951–1952	Synd	30 min.	The Black Museum	"The .32 Calibre Bullet" (also known as "The Centre-Fire Bullet")	Yes	Yes			
1951–1952	Synd	30 min.	The Black Museum	"The Trunk"	Yes	Yes			
1951–1952	Synd	30 min.	The Black Museum	"Twin Messengers of Death" (also known as "Two Bullets'")	Yes	Yes			
1951–1952	Synd	30 min.	The Black Museum	"The Walking Stick"	Yes	Yes			
1951–1952	Synd	30 min.	The Black Museum	"A Woman's Pigskin Glove"	Yes	Yes			

== 1952 ==
Date	Network	Length	Series	Details	Surviving recording	Involvement			
Date	Network	Length	Series	Details	Surviving recording	Actor	Director	Producer	Writer
September 2	BBC		Portrait of Robert Flaherty	(Note: Memorial tribute comprising reminiscences recorded over many months. Cast: Orson Welles, Michael Balcon, Michael Bell, Ernestine Evans, Frances H. Flaherty, Peter Freuchen, Lillian Gish, Oliver St. John Gogarty, John Grierson, John Huston, Denis Johnston, Alexander Korda, Henri Matisse, Pat Mullen, Edward Peacock, Dido and Jean Renoir, Paul Rotha, Sabu, Erich von Stroheim, Stephen Tallents, Virgil Thomson, Oliver Lawson Dick (writer), W. R. Rodgers (producer).)	Yes	Yes			

== 1953 ==
Date	Network	Length	Series	Details	Surviving recording	Involvement			
Date	Network	Length	Series	Details	Surviving recording	Actor	Director	Producer	Writer
April	BBC	60 min.	Song of Myself	(Note: Orson Welles narrates and performs the work by Walt Whitman.)	Yes	Yes			
October 4	Synd	30 min.	Theatre Royale	"The Queen of Spades" (Note: From the Haymarket Theatre, London. Cast: Orson Welles, Laurence Olivier (host), Alexander Pushkin (author), Derek Patmore (adaptor), Sidney Torch (music), Harry Alan Towers (producer).)	Yes	Yes			

== 1954 ==
Date	Network	Length	Series	Details	Surviving recording	Involvement			
Date	Network	Length	Series	Details	Surviving recording	Actor	Director	Producer	Writer
December 21	BBC	30 min.	The Adventures of Sherlock Holmes	"The Final Problem" (Note: Cast: John Gielgud (Sherlock Holmes), Ralph Richardson (Dr. Watson), Orson Welles (Moriarty), Harry Alan Towers (producer), Tig Roe (director).)	Yes	Yes			

== 1956 ==
Date	Network	Length	Series	Details	Surviving recording	Involvement			
Date	Network	Length	Series	Details	Surviving recording	Actor	Director	Producer	Writer
October 17	Synd	60 min.	Tomorrow	(Note: Nuclear war drama produced and syndicated by ABC and the Federal Civil Defense Administration. Cast: Orson Welles (narrator), Marshall Thompson, Mona Freeman, Philip Wylie (author), Jimmy Wallington (announcer), Milton Geiger (adaptor), Bill Karn (director).)	Yes	Yes			
November 13	NBC	60 min.	Biography in Sound	"They Knew Alexander Woollcott" (Note: Cast: Kenneth Banghart (narrator), Charles Brackett, Jane Grant, Harold K. Guinzburg, Ben Hecht, Joseph Hennessey, Charles Lederer, Robert Barnes Rudd, Eleanor Roosevelt, Orson Welles, Rebecca West, Alexander Woollcott, John C. Wilson (preparer).)	Yes	Yes			
