= New Orleans (1947 film) =

1947 musical drama film directed by Arthur Lubin

- Theatrical release poster
- Directed by: Arthur Lubin
- Screenplay by: Elliot Paul; Dick Irving Hyland
- Story by: Elliot Paul; Herbert J. Biberman
- Produced by: Jules Levey; Herbert Biberman
- Starring: Arturo de Córdova; Dorothy Patrick; Marjorie Lord; Billie Holiday; Louis Armstrong; Woody Herman
- Cinematography: Lucien Andriot
- Edited by: Bernard W. Burton
- Music by: Nat W. Finston; Woody Herman
- Production company: Majestic Productions
- Distributed by: United Artists
- Release date: April 18, 1947 (United States)
- Running time: 90 minutes
- Country: United States
- Language: English

New Orleans is a 1947 American musical romance film starring Arturo de Córdova and Dorothy Patrick, and directed by Arthur Lubin. Though it features a rather conventional plot, the film is noteworthy both for casting jazz legends Billie Holiday as a singing maid romantically involved with bandleader Louis Armstrong, and extensive playing of New Orleans-style Dixieland jazz: over twenty songs (or versions of songs) are featured in whole or part.

Armstrong's band contains a virtual Who's Who of classic jazz greats, including trombonist Kid Ory, drummer Zutty Singleton, clarinetist Barney Bigard, guitar player Bud Scott, bassist George "Red" Callender, pianist Charlie Beal, and pianist Meade Lux Lewis. Also performing in the film is cornetist Mutt Carey and bandleader Woody Herman.

New Orleans is Holiday's only feature film appearance.

== Plot ==
A Storyville casino owner and a high society opera singer fall in love during the birth of the blues in New Orleans.

== Cast ==
- Arturo de Córdova as Nick Duquesne
- Dorothy Patrick as Miralee Smith
- Marjorie Lord as Grace Voiselle
- Irene Rich as Mrs. Rutledge Smith
- John Alexander as Col. McArdle
- Richard Hageman as Henry Ferber
- Jack Lambert as Biff Lewis
- Bert Conway as Tommy Lake
- Joan Blair as Constance Vigil
- John Canady
- Louis Armstrong
- Billie Holiday as Endie
- Woody Herman and His Orchestra
- Zutty Singleton on drums
- Barney Bigard on clarinet
- Kid Ory on trombone
- Bud Scott on guitar
- Red Callender on bass
- Charlie Beal on piano
- Meade Lux Lewis on piano
- Mutt Carey on trumpet
- Shelley Winters as Miss Holmbright (Nick's New York secretary; uncredited)

== Production ==
New Orleans has its origins in an abandoned component of an unfinished RKO Pictures feature film by Orson Welles — "The Story of Jazz" segment of It's All True. A history of jazz alternatively titled "Jam Session", the section of the film was being written by Elliot Paul in 1941 under contract to Welles. The story of Louis Armstrong was to have been central to that segment of It's All True.

An additional connection to Welles is that several members of the film's Original New Orleans Ragtime Band — Kid Ory, Mutt Carey, Bud Scott, Barney Bigard and Zutty Singleton — had first been brought together in 1944, for his CBS Radio series, The Orson Welles Almanac.

New Orleans is the only feature film made by singer Billie Holiday, and the last film in which writer-producer Herbert J. Biberman was involved before he was blacklisted.

Producer Jules Levey wanted to make a film about the history of jazz. Lubin signed to direct in July 1946.

Levey's associate was Herbert Biberman who said "we're not archaeologists. We're trying to be accurate with dates and places, if not names – and still turn out an entertaining picture."

In July 1946 Arthur Lubin was scouting for locations in New Orleans. He hoped to feature Lena Horne, Duke Ellington and other black musicians. Ten days of location filming started on 28 August and cost $110,000. The National Jazz Foundation collaborated with Lubin during filming.

De Cordova was borrowed from Eagle-Lion Films in August. Dorothy Patrick was borrowed from MGM. Levey was so pleased with the performances of Patrick and de Cordova he wanted to reteam them in a film called Monterey to celebrate California's 100th anniversary, though the picture was never made.

== Reception ==
A 2019 review in Diabolique magazine stated, "it’s one of those movies where critics generally go “the music’s great but everything else is terrible and isn’t Hollywood racist” which is basically true – but it was 1947, what did people expect? At least there is a lot of music, Louis Armstrong and Dorothy Patrick are charming, it’s fascinating to see Holliday in a movie and I love how in the story her character marries Armstrong’s. Also Lubin seems to have genuine affection for the characters and the music – it’s much better than his previous three features."

Lubin said there were "fabolous people in" the film "but I don't think the picture did very well, that had an unknown leading lady which they borrowed from MGM.

== Home media ==
- 2000: Kino Lorber Home Video, Region 1 DVD, April 25, 2000

== Soundtrack ==
Although most of the music created for New Orleans was truncated in the film's release version, a soundtrack issued in 1983 made the full versions of the songs available, with additional music cut from the final release. Songs include "Do You Know What It Means to Miss New Orleans?"

=== Tracklist ===
Per AFI, the tracklist is:

- A1 Flee As A Bird / When The Saints Go Marching In
- A2 West End Blues
- A3 Do You Know What It Means To Miss New Orleans?
- A4 Brahms' Lullaby
- A5 Tiger Rag
- A6 Buddy Bolden Blues Take #3
- A7 Buddy Bolden Blues Take #4
- A8 Basin St. Blues
- A9 Raymond St. Blues
- A10 Milenberg Joys
- A11 Where The Blues Were Born In New Orleans
- A12 Farewell To Storyville
- B1 Beale Street Stomp
- B2 Dippermouth Blues (Slow Version)
- B3 Dippermouth Blues (Fast Version)
- B4 Shimme-Sha-Wabble
- B5 Ballin' The Jack
- B6 King Porter Stomp
- B7 Mahogany Hall Stomp (Slow Version)
- B8 Mahogany Hall Stomp (Fast Version)
- B9 The Blues Are Brewin'
- B10 Endie
- B11 Do You Know What It Means To Miss New Orleans?
