= Freddie Washington (pianist) =

American jazz pianist (1887–1962)

- Born: January 20, 1887; Schulenburg, Texas, United States
- Died: February 25, 1962 (aged 75) Los Angeles, California
- Genres: Jazz
- Occupation: Pianist
- Instrument: Piano
- Label: Capitol

Freddie Washington (January 20, 1887 – February 25, 1962, Los Angeles) was an American jazz pianist.

== Life and career ==
Freddie Washington was born in Schulenburg, Texas on January 20, 1887. He joined the United States Army and was stationed in California with the 805th Pioneer Infantry in 1918–1919. He served as the band corporal in that unit. In 1921 he joined Kid Ory's band in Oakland, California. He recorded with Ory's band, and it is for his role in these sessions that he is primarily known.

Washington led his own band in the 1920s and 1930s, in addition to playing with Ed Garland and Paul Howard. In 1941, he was a pallbearer at the funeral of Jelly Roll Morton in Los Angeles. He recorded on Capitol Records in 1944 with Zutty Singleton, and performed with Kid Ory's band on a live broadcast of the wartime variety show The Orson Welles Almanac (July 12, 1944). Washington continued playing into the 1960s.

Washington died in Los Angeles on February 25, 1962.

== Sources ==
- "Freddie Washington", Grove Jazz (online)
- John Chilton, Who's Who of Jazz
