= Buster Wilson =

American jazz pianist

- Birth name: Albert Wesley Wilson
- Also known as: Buster Wilson
- Born: 1897 Atlanta, Georgia, U.S.
- Died: 1949 (aged 51–52)
- Genres: Jazz
- Instrument: Piano

Albert Wesley "Buster" Wilson (1897 - October 23, 1949) was an American jazz pianist.

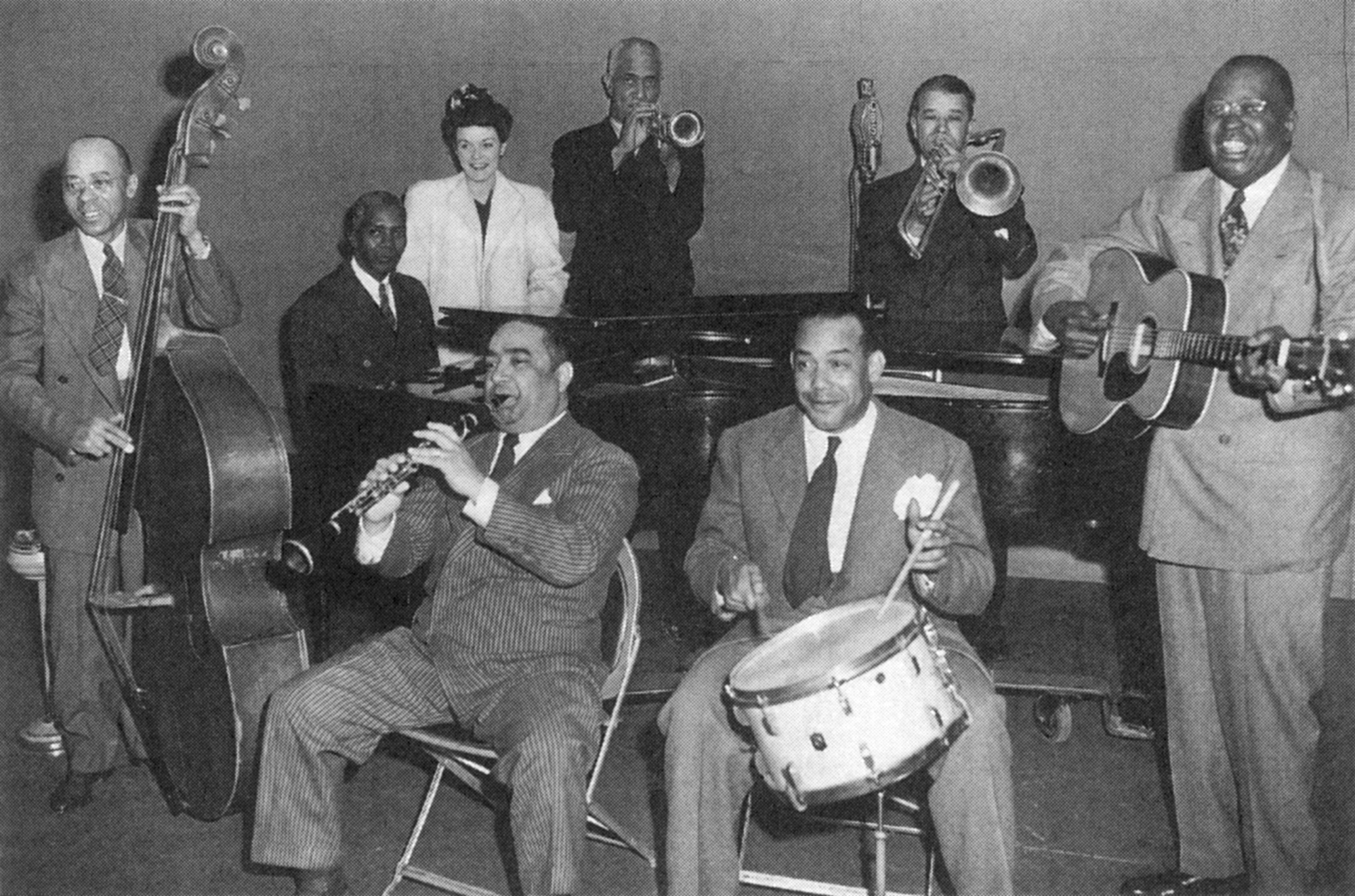
The All Star Jazz Group, left to right: Ed Garland (bass), Buster Wilson (piano), Marili Morden (proprietor, Jazz Man Records), Jimmie Noone (clarinet), Mutt Carey (trumpet), Zutty Singleton (drums), Kid Ory (trombone), Bud Scott (guitar)

== Biography ==
Buster Wilson was born in Atlanta and grew up in Los Angeles. He was the replacement for Lil Hardin in King Oliver's band in 1921 during its engagement at the Wayside Park. In 1922 he played with Dink Johnson's Five Hounds of Jazz, then with the Charlie Lawrence-led Sunnyland Jazz Orchestra from 1923 to 1926. Following this he played with Mutt Carey (1927), Jimmie Noone, Curtis Mosby, Paul Howard, Lionel Hampton (1935), and Les Hite. He played with Jelly Roll Morton in 1941 for rehearsals.

In 1944 Wilson became a member of a traditional New Orleans band that was a leader of the West Coast revival, put together for the CBS Radio series The Orson Welles Almanac. The all-star band also included Mutt Carey, Ed Garland, Jimmie Noone (succeeded by Barney Bigard), Kid Ory, Bud Scott and Zutty Singleton. Renamed Kid Ory's Creole Jazz Band, the group then made a significant series of recordings on the Crescent Records label.

Wilson played with Kid Ory's Creole Jazz Band until 1948. Failing health led him to quit Ory's group, and he died of pneumonia in 1949.

Record label American Music released a collection of his recordings from 1947-49 in 1996.
