= Ed Garland =

American jazz musician (1895–1980)

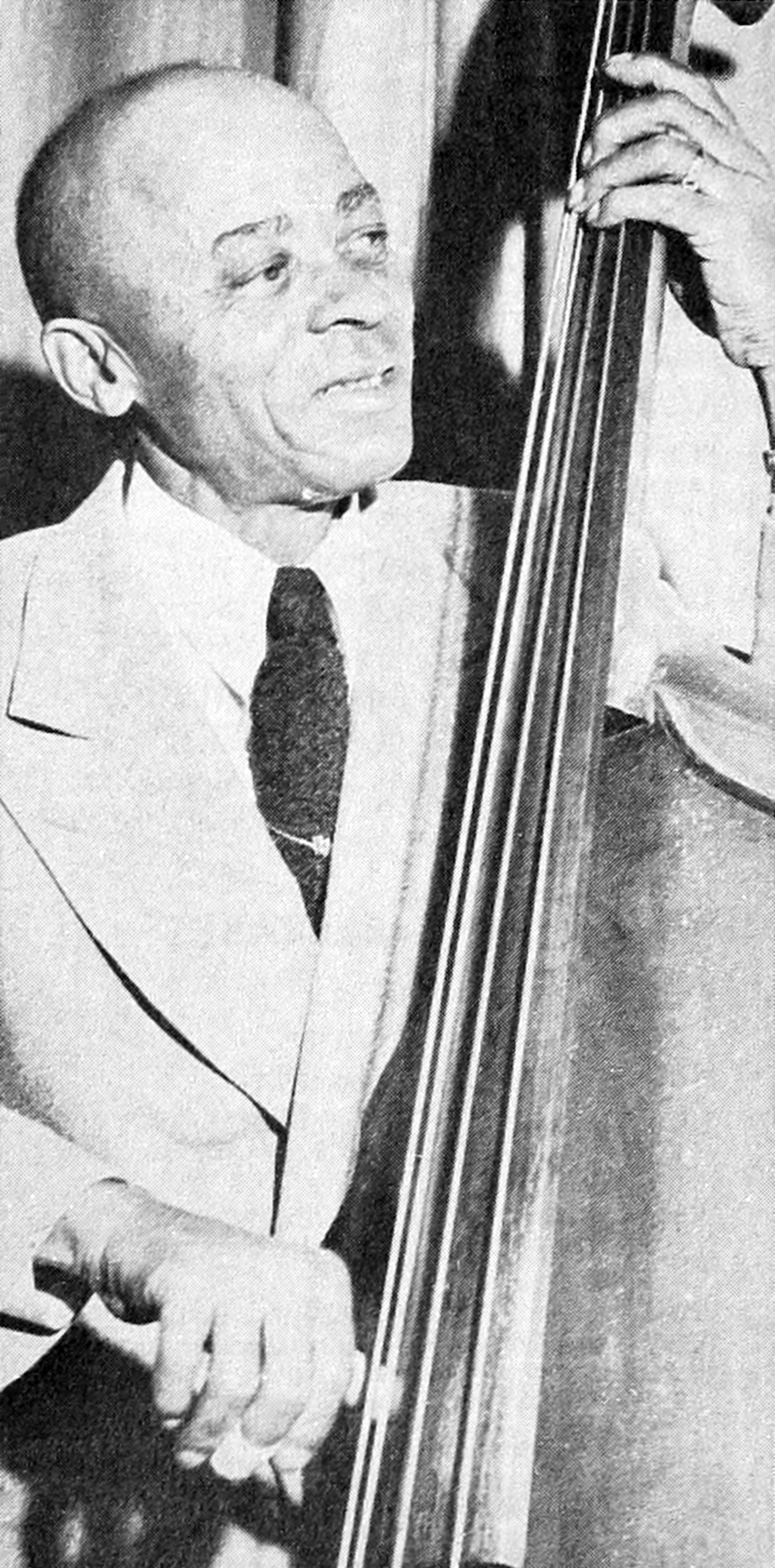
- Garland in 1948

Background information
- Birth name: Edward Bertram Garland
- Born: January 9, 1895; New Orleans, Louisiana, U.S.
- Died: January 22, 1980 (aged 85); London, England
- Genres: Jazz
- Occupation: Session musician
- Instrument: Double bass

Edward Bertram Garland (January 9, 1895 – January 22, 1980) was an American jazz double bassist. He was commonly known as Ed Garland, and sometimes Montudie Garland (a nickname he disliked).

== Biography ==
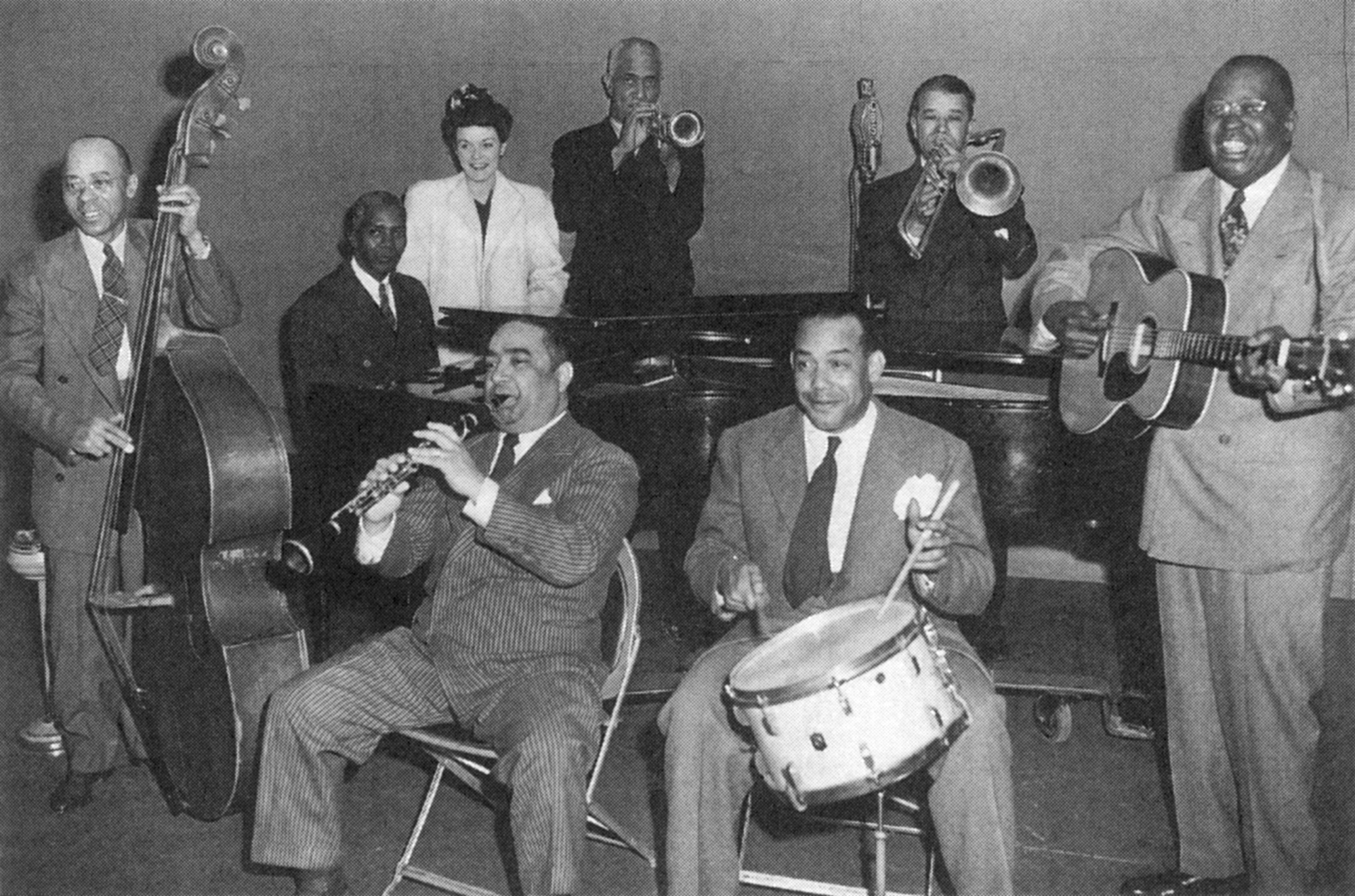
The All Star Jazz Group, left to right: Ed Garland (bass), Buster Wilson (piano), Marili Morden (proprietor, Jazz Man Records), Jimmie Noone (clarinet), Mutt Carey (trumpet), Zutty Singleton (drums), Kid Ory (trombone), Bud Scott (guitar)

Ed Garland was born in New Orleans on January 9, 1895. By about 1910, he was playing bass drum with brass bands including Frankie Duson's Eagle Band. He then took up tuba and string bass; like many New Orleans bassists of the era, he doubled on the two instruments which filled similar roles in different types of bands. He played with the Excelsior Brass Band and Manuel Perez's Imperial Orchestra. He joined other early New Orleans bands that played in Chicago and California, playing with Lawrence Duhé, Joe "King" Oliver, and Freddie Keppard. In 1916 Garland joined King Oliver and went to California. He led his own One-Eleven Jazz Band during the Depression.

In 1941, he was a pallbearer at the funeral of Jelly Roll Morton in Los Angeles.

In 1944 Garland became best known as a member of a traditional New Orleans band that was a leader of the West Coast revival, put together for the CBS Radio series The Orson Welles Almanac. The all-star band also included Mutt Carey, Jimmie Noone (succeeded by Barney Bigard), Kid Ory, Bud Scott, Zutty Singleton and Buster Wilson. Renamed Kid Ory's Creole Jazz Band, the group then made a significant series of recordings on the Crescent Records label.

Garland appeared in the 1959 film Imitation of Life, performing with Andrew Blakeney, Teddy Buckner, George Orendorf and Joe Darensbourg in the funeral sequence ("Trouble of the World") featuring Mahalia Jackson.

Garland died in London, England.
