= Crescent Records =

- Founded: 1944
- Founder: Nesuhi Ertegun
- Defunct: 1946
- Status: Defunct
- Genre: Jazz
- Country of origin: U.S.

Crescent Records was an American independent record label that produced jazz recordings from 1944 to 1946. It was founded by Nesuhi Ertegun to record a band that was assembled to perform on CBS Radio's 1944 variety series The Orson Welles Almanac. Only one group, Kid Ory's Creole Jazz Band, was released on the Crescent label, which was distributed by Hollywood's Jazz Man Record Shop. Although only eight discs were released, Crescent Records was involved in the international revival of traditional jazz in the 1940s.

== History ==
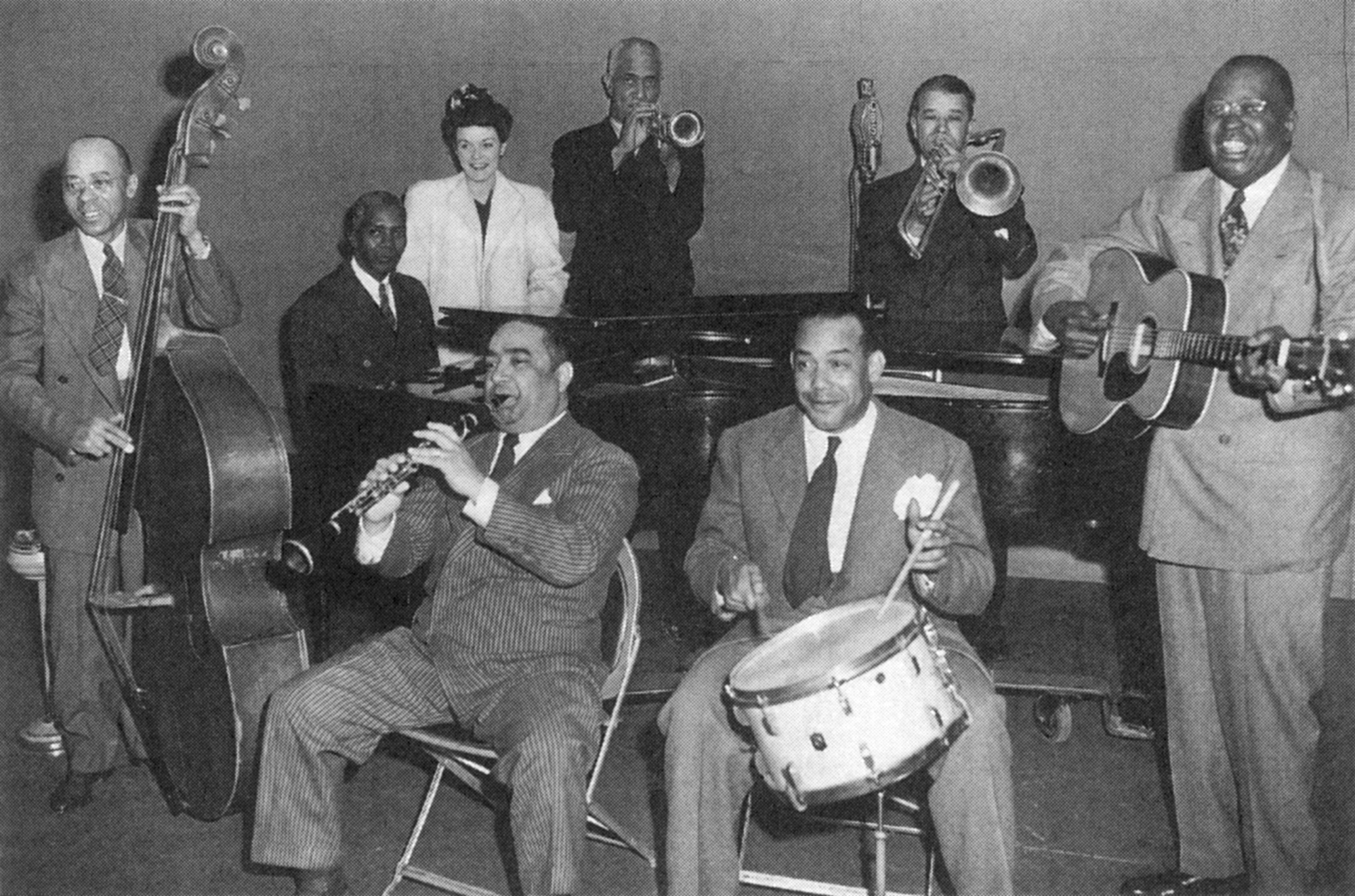
The All Star Jazz Group, early 1944 (left to right): Ed Garland (bass), Buster Wilson (piano), Marili Morden (proprietor, Jazz Man Records), Jimmie Noone (clarinet), Mutt Carey (trumpet), Zutty Singleton (drums), Kid Ory (trombone), Bud Scott (guitar)

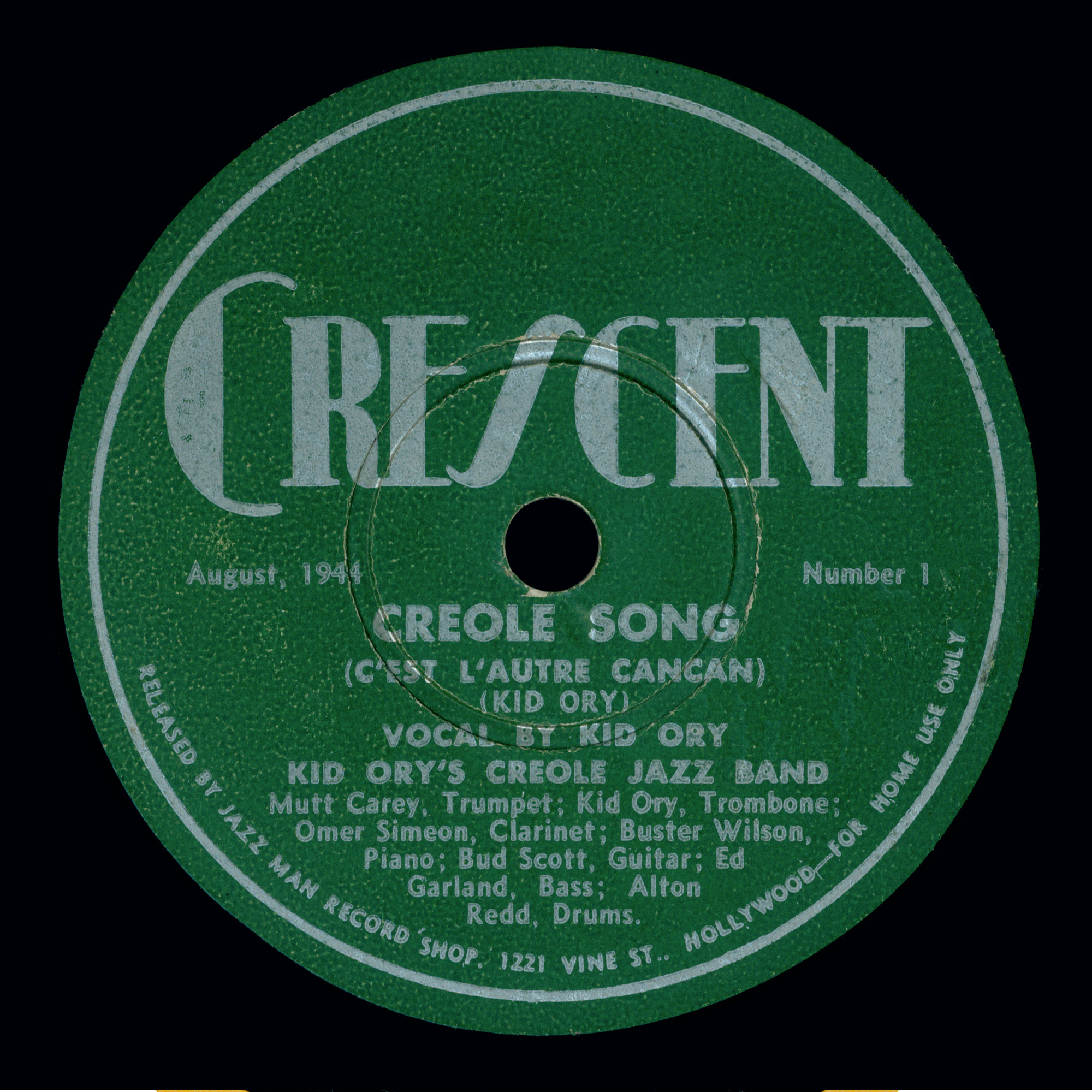
Crescent Records Number 1 by Kid Ory's Creole Jazz Band, recorded on August 3, 1944

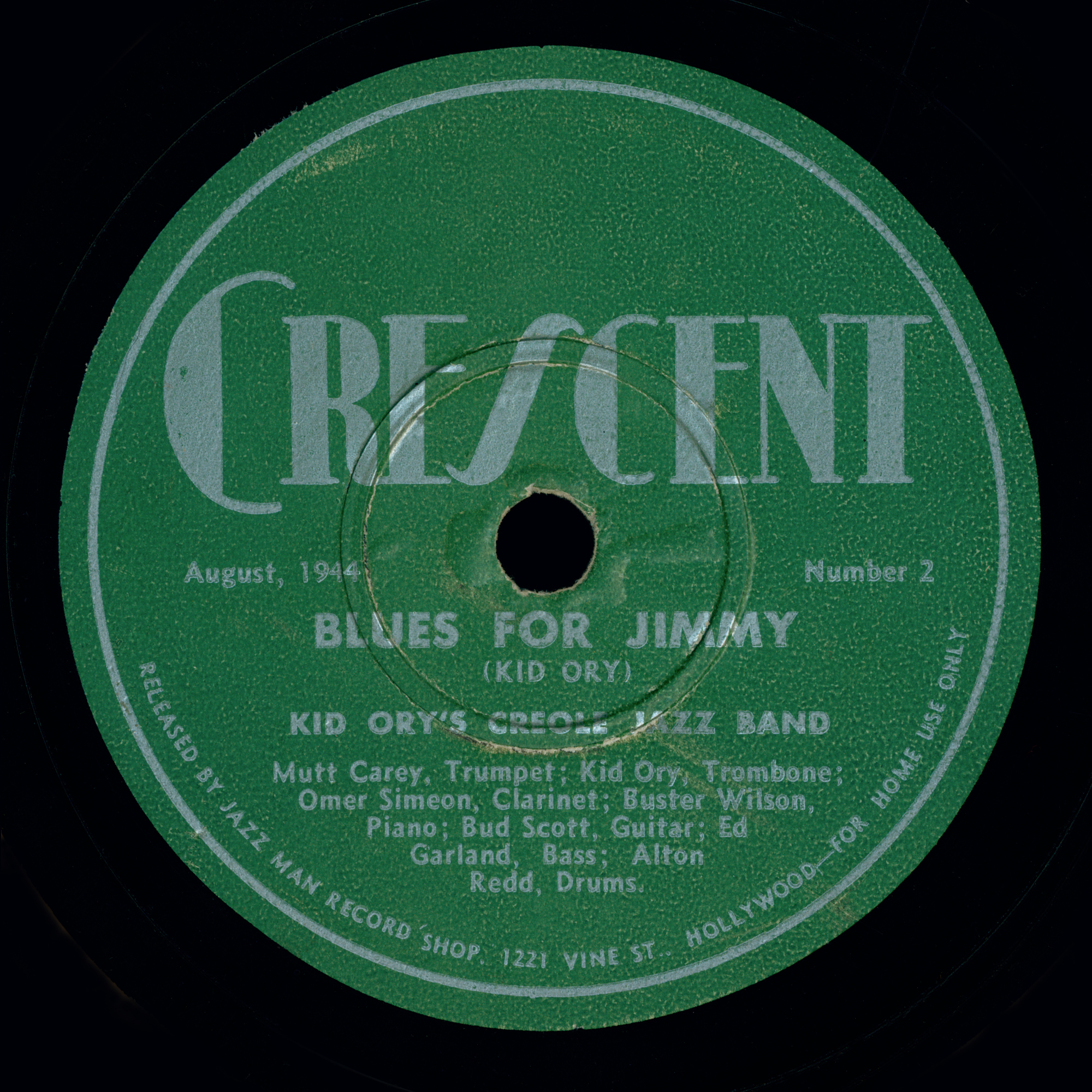
Crescent Records Number 2 featured Blues for Jimmie (misspelled "Jimmy" on the label), recorded August 3, 1944

Crescent Records was founded by Nesuhi Ertegun in 1944, with the express purpose of recording the All Star Jazz Group featured on the CBS Radio program, The Orson Welles Almanac. Ertegun produced the four recording sessions; the label was owned by Marili Morden, proprietor of the Jazz Man Record Shop in Hollywood. Only eight discs were released on the Crescent label, all of them made by the group Ertegun renamed Kid Ory's Creole Jazz Band.

The All Star Jazz Group was founded in February 1944 by Marili Morden at the request of Orson Welles. A passionate and knowledgeable fan of traditional jazz, Welles wanted an authentic New Orleans jazz band for his weekly variety show on CBS Radio. Within minutes Morden assembled Mutt Carey (trumpet), Ed Garland (bass), Kid Ory (trombone), Bud Scott (guitar), Zutty Singleton (drums), Buster Wilson (piano), and Jimmie Noone (clarinet, replaced by Barney Bigard after Noone's death). The All Star Jazz Group first performed on The Orson Welles Almanac March 15, 1944; its last performance was July 12, 1944, on the penultimate show in the series. Their performances on the Welles show were so popular that the band became a regular feature, launched Ory's comeback, and was an important force in reviving interest in New Orleans jazz.

"Viewed in perspective," Ertegun later wrote, "they are among the most significant jazz records ever made: they gave eloquent proof of the continuing vitality of New Orleans jazz at a time when such proof was needed. They also revealed that Kid Ory's trombone was more powerful and more exuberant than it had ever been before, and that the master from New Orleans was still improving after a life almost as long as the life of jazz."

Ertegun retired the Crescent label after he purchased Jazz Man Records in late 1946. The eight Crescent discs were reissued on the Jazz Man Records label (Jazz Man 21–28) between 1946 and 1947. On January 15, 1952, Good Time Jazz Records purchased the Crescent masters and the rest of the Jazz Man catalog for $5,500. The Crescent recordings were reissued on Good Time Jazz Records L-10 and L-11 (1953) and L-12022 (1957).

== Discography ==
In 4 recording sessions, four tracks for each date, the Crescent label issued 8 discs, numbered from 1 to 8, with two tracks each. The order of the tracks is that in which they were recorded.

Mutt Carey (trumpet), Ed Garland (bass), Minor Hall (drums), Kid Ory (trombone), Bud Scott (guitar), Omer Simeon (clarinet), Buster Wilson (piano) - Recorded in Hollywood L. A., August 3, 1944; released early 1946^{[1][2]: 144}

1. "Get Out of Here" (Kid Ory and Bud Scott) - Crescent 2
2. "South" (Bennie Moten and Thamon Hayes) - Crescent 1
3. "Blues for Jimmy" (Kid Ory) - Crescent 2
4. "Creole Song"_ C'est L'autre cancan" (Kid Ory) - Crescent 1

same but Darnell Howard (clarinet) replace Omer Simeon - Recorded in Hollywood L. A., August 5, 1945; released November 15, 1945 ^{[1][2]: 144–145}

1. "Panama" (Will H. Tyers) - Crescent 7
2. "Careless Love" (Traditional) - Crescent 5
3. "Do What Ory Say" (Kid Ory) - Crescent 5
4. "Under the Bamboo Tree" (Bob Cole) - Crescent 7

same but Omer Simeon(clarinet) replace Darnell Howard. Recorded in Hollywood L. A., September 8, 1945; released January 1, 1946 ^{[1][2]: 133, 144}

1. "1919" (Traditional) - Crescent 4
2. "Maryland" (Traditional) - Crescent 3
3. “Down Home Rag" (Wilbur Sweatman) - Crescent 4
4. “Oh Didn't He Ramble" (Traditional) - Crescent

same. Recorded in Hollywood L. A., November 3, 1945; released early 1946 ^{[1][2]: 145}

1. "Original Dixieland One-Step" (D.J. LaRocca) - Crescent 6
2. "Maple Leaf Rag" (Scott Joplin) - Crescent 8
3. Weary Blues" (Artie Matthews) - Crescent 8
4. "Ory's Creole Trombone" (Kid Ory) - Crescent 6
- Jazz Man Records
- List of record labels
