= Mutt Carey =

American jazz trumpeter (1891–1948)

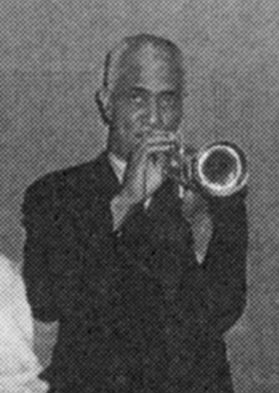

Background information
- Also known as: Papa Mutt Carey
- Born: Thomas Carey; September 17, 1891; Hahnville, Louisiana, U.S.
- Died: September 3, 1948 (aged 56) Lake Elsinore, California, U.S.
- Genres: Jazz
- Instrument: Trumpet
- Formerly of: Kid Ory's Creole Jazz Band

Thomas "Papa Mutt" Carey (September 17, 1891 – September 3, 1948) was an American jazz trumpeter.

== Early life ==
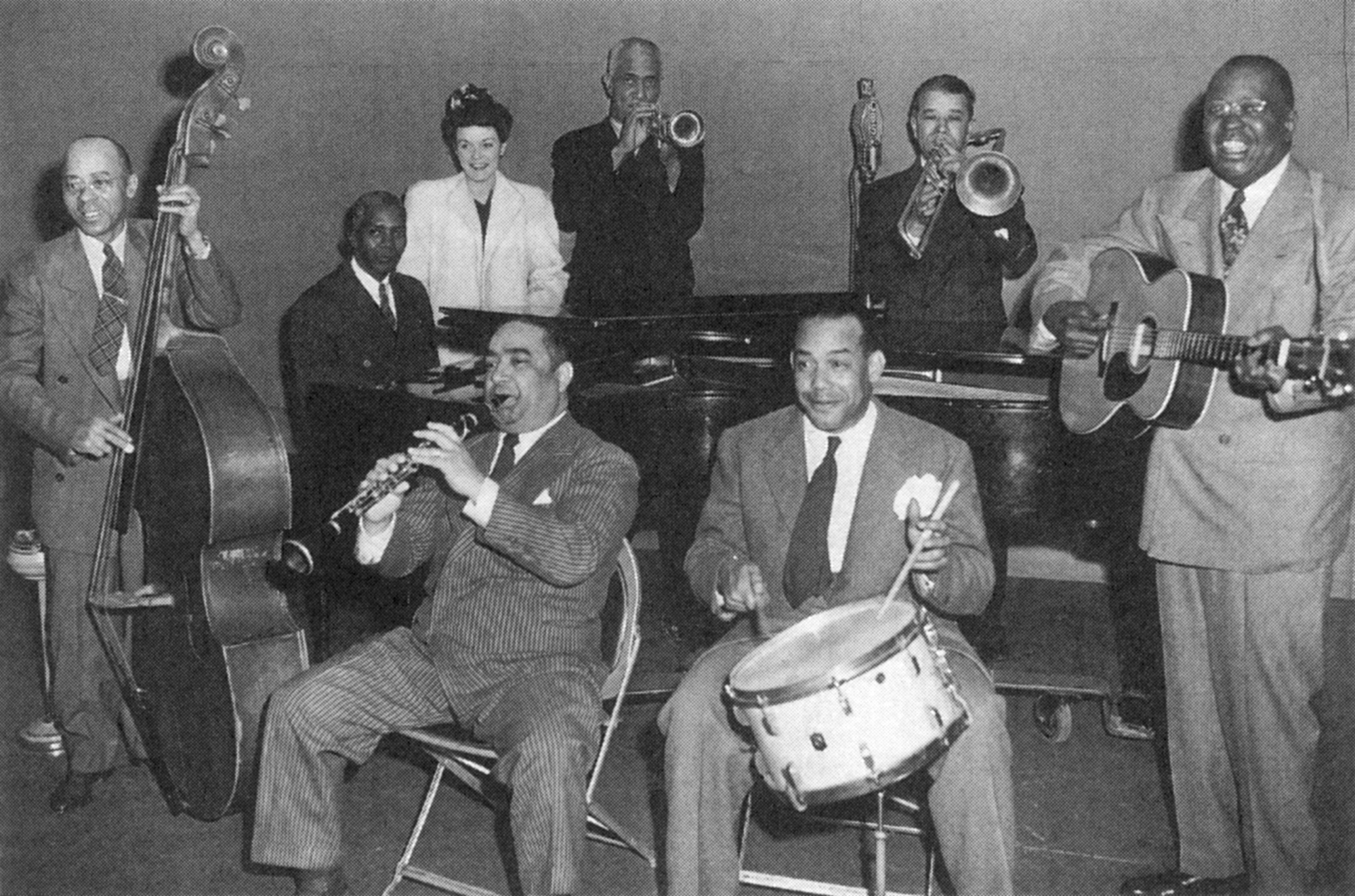
The All Star Jazz Group, left to right: Ed Garland (bass), Buster Wilson (piano), Marili Morden (proprietor, Jazz Man Records), Jimmie Noone (clarinet), Mutt Carey (trumpet), Zutty Singleton (drums), Kid Ory (trombone), Bud Scott (guitar)

Carey was born in Hahnville, Louisiana, and moved to New Orleans with his family in his youth. His older brother Jack Carey was a trombone player and bandleader; Mutt was playing cornet in his brother's band by about 1912.

== Career ==
Although Carey's early work was with brass bands in the New Orleans area (1913–17), in 1914, he started working with Kid Ory and would continue to do so, on and off, through the 1910s.

After touring the vaudeville circuits in 1917, he returned to New Orleans in 1918 and then went to California with Ory in 1919, eventually taking over leadership of the band when Ory left in 1925.

Carey's big band, the Jeffersonians, appeared in the silent films The Legion of the Condemned and The Road to Ruin (both 1928).

Carey rejoined Ory's band from around 1929 to 1933, when the lack of work during the Depression led him to work as a Pullman porter. In 1941, he was a pallbearer at the funeral of Jelly Roll Morton in Los Angeles.

In March 1944 Carey rejoined Ory in an all-star band that was a leader of the West Coast revival of traditional New Orleans jazz, put together for the CBS Radio series The Orson Welles Almanac. The All Star Jazz Group also included Ed Garland, Jimmie Noone (succeeded by Barney Bigard), Bud Scott, Zutty Singleton and Buster Wilson. Renamed Kid Ory's Creole Jazz Band, the group then made a significant series of recordings on the Crescent Records label.

Carey left Ory's band in 1947 to lead a group under his own name.

== Personal life ==
Carey died in Lake Elsinore, California, on September 3, 1948, aged 56.
