= Bud Scott =

American jazz musician

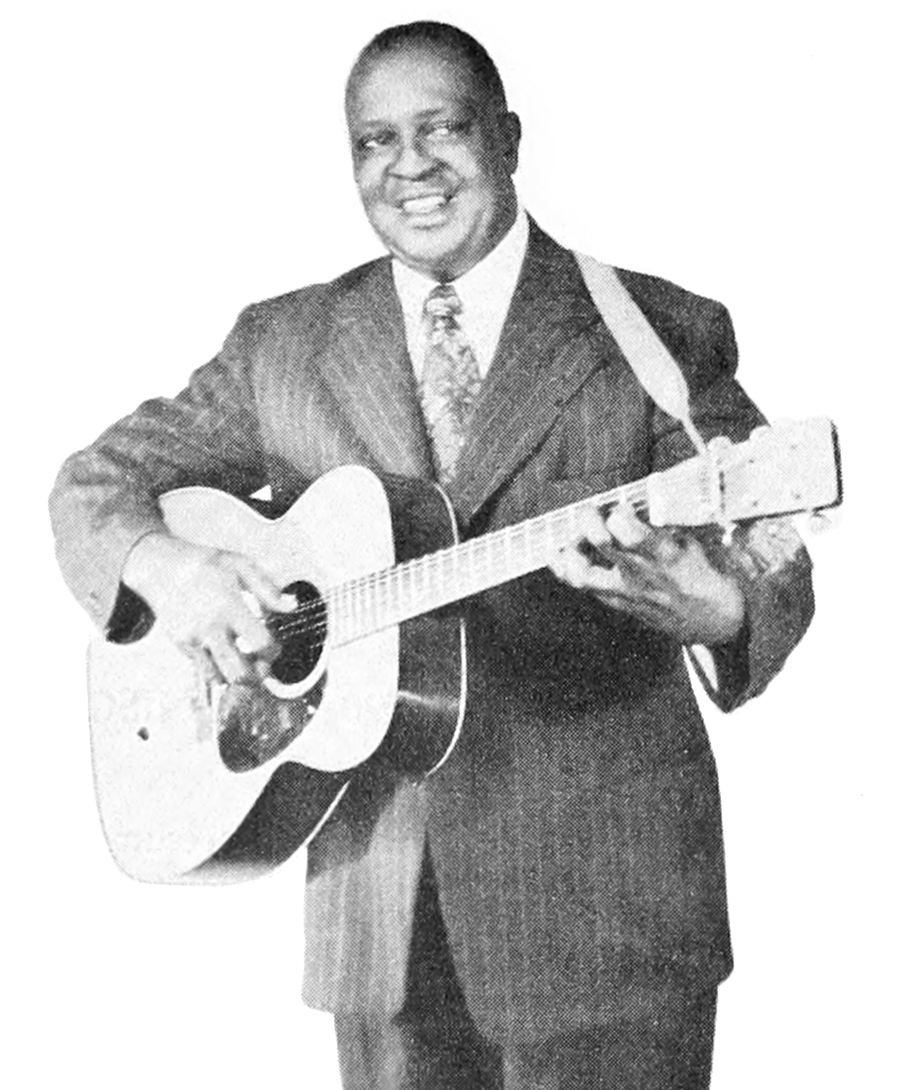

Background information
- Born: Arthur Budd Scott; January 11, 1890; New Orleans, Louisiana, US
- Died: July 2, 1949 (aged 59) Los Angeles, California, US
- Genres: Jazz, Dixieland
- Occupation: Session musician
- Instruments: Guitar, banjo
- Years active: 1904–1948
- Labels: Victor; Vocalion

Arthur Budd Scott (January 11, 1890 – July 2, 1949) was an American jazz guitarist, banjoist and singer. He was one of the earliest musicians associated with the New Orleans jazz scene. As a violinist he performed with James Reese Europe's Clef Club Orchestra at a historic 1912 concert at Carnegie Hall, and the following year worked with Europe's ensemble on the first jazz recordings on the Victor label.

A graduate of the Peabody School of Music, Scott was a notable rhythm guitarist in Chicago's Jazz Age nightclubs of the 1920s. After performing and recording with Jimmie Noone's Apex Club Orchestra in 1928 he moved to California. He was able to make a living as a professional musician through the 1930s, when traditional jazz was eclipsed by big-band swing music, and formed his own trio. In 1944 Scott joined an all-star combination that evolved into Kid Ory's Creole Jazz Band, an important force in reviving interest in New Orleans-style jazz in the 1940s, and he wrote the majority of the band's arrangements.

== Biography ==
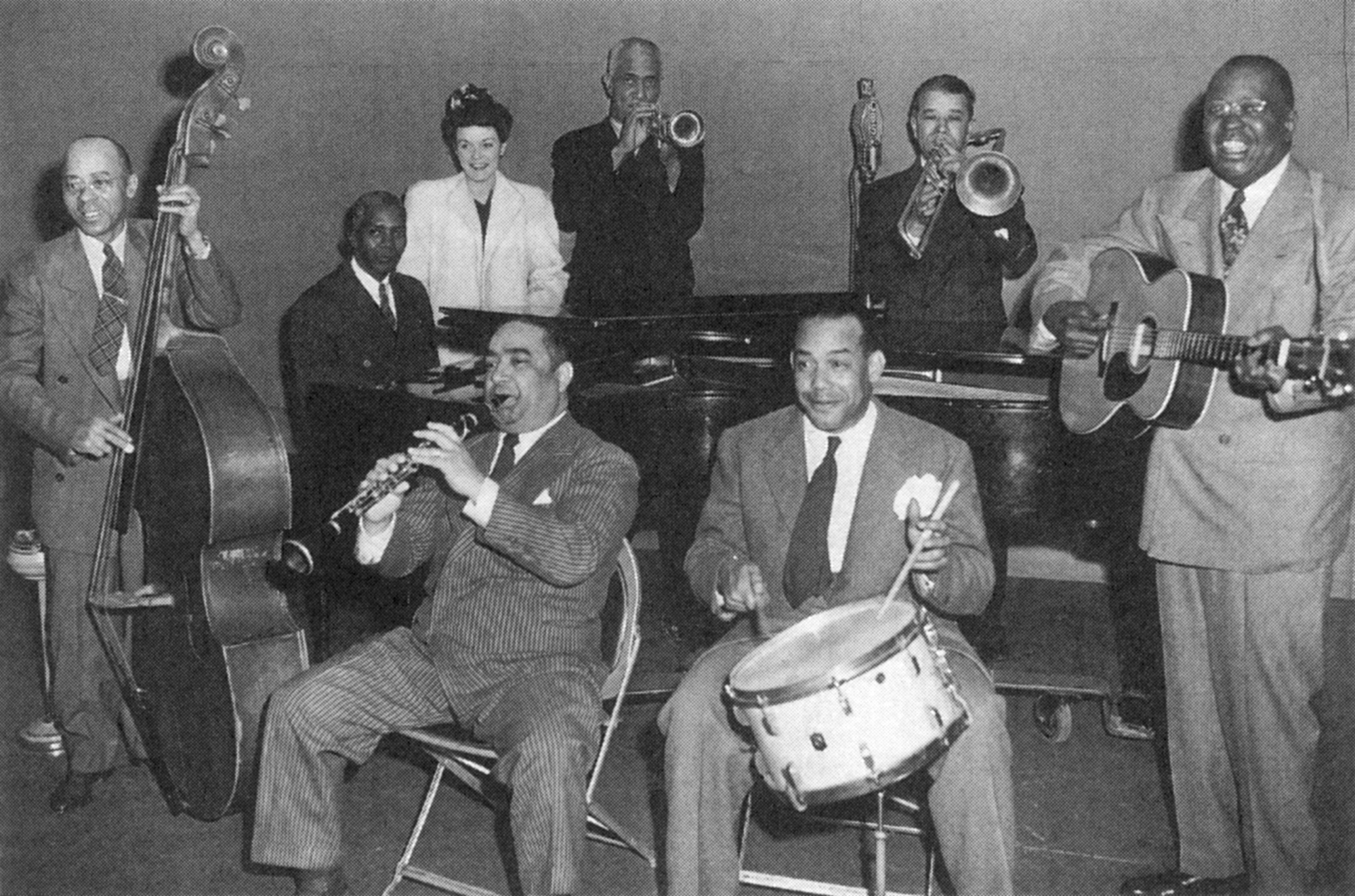
The All Star Jazz Group put together for Orson Welles's 1944 radio series, from left: Ed Garland (bass), Buster Wilson (piano), Marili Morden (proprietor of Jazz Man Records), Jimmie Noone (clarinet), Mutt Carey (trumpet), Zutty Singleton (drums), Kid Ory (trombone), Bud Scott (guitar)

Arthur Budd Scott, known as Bud Scott, was born January 11, 1890, in New Orleans, Louisiana. As a teenager he played with Buddy Bolden; he played guitar and violin as a child and performed professionally from an early age. His first job was with New Orleans dance band leader John Robichaux in 1904. In 1911 he was playing guitar with Freddie Keppard's Olympia Orchestra. Scott left New Orleans with a large travelling show in 1912. After the show's New York engagements, Scott joined the Clef Club, a musical society that included Marian Anderson and Paul Robeson. At age 22 he was in the string section of the 125-piece Clef Club Orchestra when it performed a historic concert at Carnegie Hall May 2, 1912, under the direction of James Reese Europe.

"That was the first time jazz was heard in that sedate hall — although we called it 'ragtime' then," Scott told jazz historian Floyd Levin. "We received a standing ovation from the first racially mixed audience ever permitted in Carnegie Hall."

Scott played on a number of Victor Talking Machine Company ragtime recordings with James Reese Europe's Society Orchestra in 1913. He worked with Europe at Vernon and Irene Castle's fashionable nightclub, but he remained in New York when the orchestra accompanied the Castles on their first national tour. Scott studied music theory with Walter Damrosch, and he later graduated from the Peabody School of Music.

Scott found work playing banjo with Bob Young in Baltimore in 1917. In 1921 he played in Will Marion Cook's Orchestra.

In 1923 Scott moved to Chicago and replaced Bill Johnson in King Oliver's Creole Jazz Band. When Oliver's band recorded "Dippermouth Blues", Scott originated the now-traditional shout, "Oh, play that thing!" He also worked with Johnny Dodds and Jimmy Blythe, Erskine Tate, Jelly Roll Morton's Red Hot Peppers and Richard M. Jones' Jazz Wizards.

Scott was the first person to use a guitar in a modern dance orchestra, in Dave Peyton's group accompanying Ethel Waters at Chicago's Cafe de Paris. He then joined Jimmie Noone's Apex Club Orchestra, and was part of the Vocalion recording sessions in 1928 that included "Blues My Naughty Sweetie Gives to Me", featuring Scott's guitar solo; "King Joe", written by Scott; and "Sweet Lorraine", which Scott would later call "the best recording I ever made".

In 1929 Scott was one of the many New Orleans musicians who moved to California. "I joined Mutt Carey's band playing in clubs around Los Angeles", Scott told jazz historian Floyd Levin. "From 1930 to 1944 I played every conceivable sort of date to make a living. I played solos, worked in vaudeville shows, film and radio studios, and the pit orchestra at the Lincoln Theater. I formed a trio and played in some of the best Hollywood spots including the Florentine Gardens".

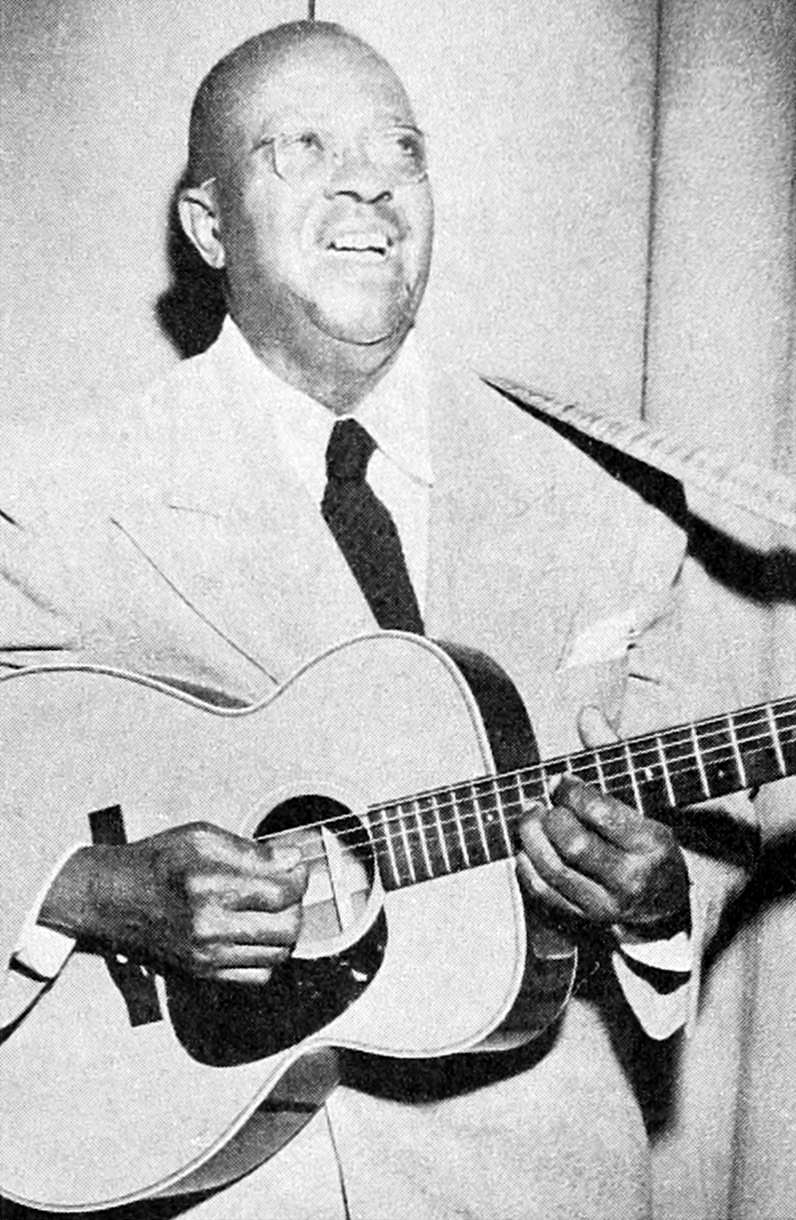
Scott in 1948

In 1944 Scott joined an all-star traditional New Orleans band that led the West Coast revival, put together for the CBS Radio series The Orson Welles Almanac. The All Star Jazz Group also included Mutt Carey, Ed Garland, Jimmie Noone (succeeded by Barney Bigard), Kid Ory, Zutty Singleton and Buster Wilson. Renamed Kid Ory's Creole Jazz Band, the group then made a significant series of recordings on the Crescent Records label. Ory and Scott co-wrote "Get Out of Here", one of the 16 sides the band recorded.

Scott continued to play with Kid Ory's band. With his academic background Scott also wrote most of the band's arrangements — a talent that earned him the nickname "The Master".

Scott was one of the jazz greats who performed and appeared in the 1947 film, New Orleans. Uncredited, Kid Ory's Creole Jazz Band performed on the soundtrack of the 1947 RKO feature film, Crossfire, with clarinetist Barney Bigard; "I do remember Bud Scott had to sing Shine in that old deep voice of his," Bigard later recalled.

Scott was performing with Ory's band in San Francisco in September 1948 when he suffered a severe stroke that forced him to retire from music. A group of friends organized a benefit concert January 23, 1949, to help Scott and his wife Alice with medical expenses. Performers included Danny Barker, Blue Lu Barker, Benny Carter, Pete Daily and the Chicagoans, Firehouse Five Plus Two, Erroll Garner, Dizzy Gillespie, Nappy Lamare, Nellie Lutcher, Eddie Miller, Albert Nicholas, Zutty Singleton, Ted Vesley's Dixieland band and T-Bone Walker. Kid Ory's Creole Jazz Band closed the program with "Blues for Jimmie" in honor of Jimmie Noone, whose widow was in the audience. The proceeds totalled $400, worth ten times that amount today.

Scott died in Los Angeles July 2, 1949, aged 59. His obituary ran on the front page of the Los Angeles Sentinel.

"Kid Ory wept during prayers at Bud Scotts's Masonic funeral," wrote jazz historian Floyd Levin. "So did I. It was a great privilege to know this scholarly man."
