= Jimmie Noone =

American jazz clarinetist and bandleader (1895–1944)

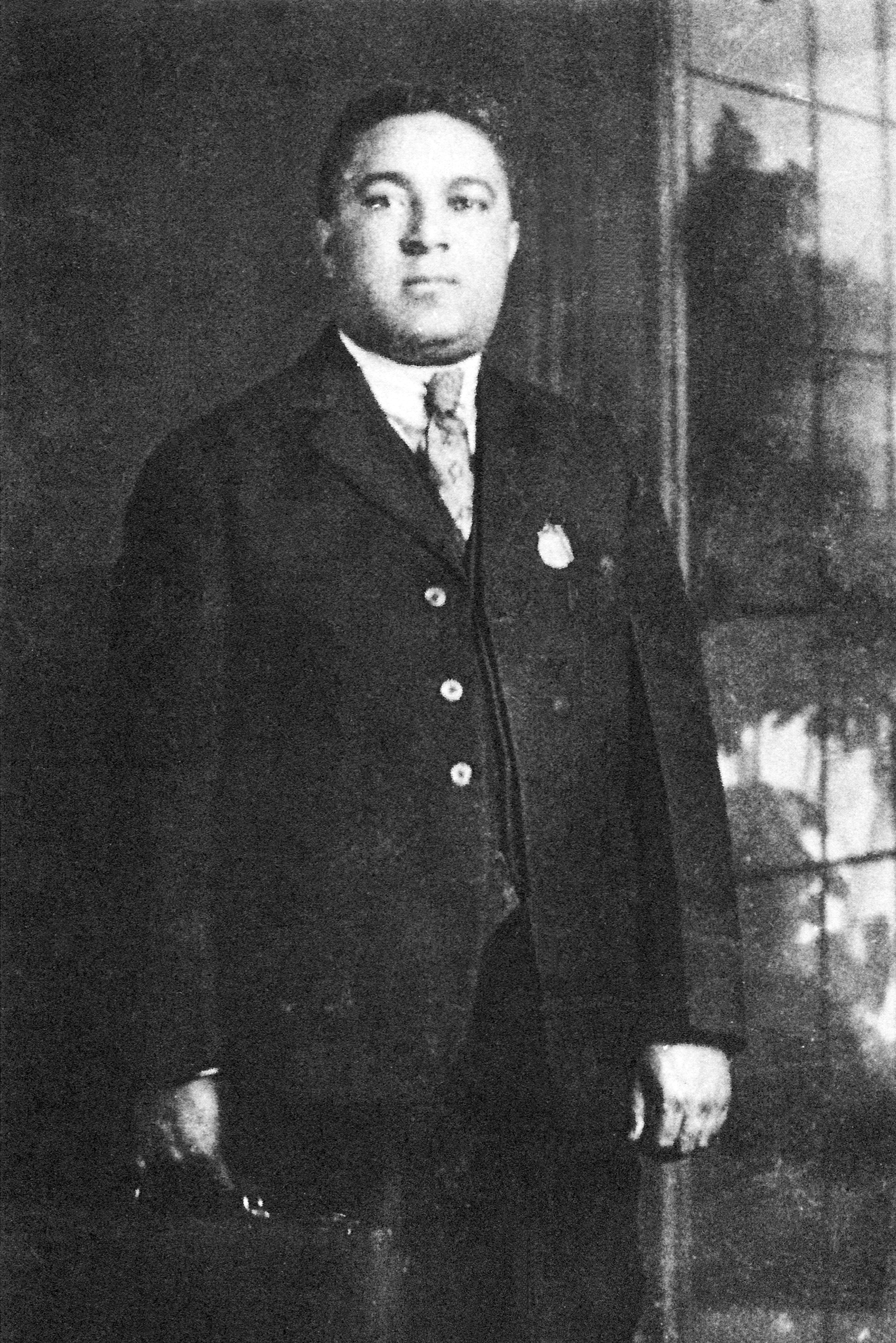
- Jimmie Noone c. 1920

Background information
- Born: April 23, 1895; New Orleans, Louisiana, U.S.
- Origin: New Orleans, Louisiana, U.S.
- Died: April 19, 1944 (aged 48) Los Angeles, California, U.S.
- Genres: Jazz, Dixieland
- Occupations: Session musician, bandleader
- Instrument: Clarinet
- Years active: 1912–1944
- Labels: Vocalion, Decca

James "Jimmie" Noone (April 23, 1895 – April 19, 1944) was an American jazz clarinetist and bandleader. After beginning his career in New Orleans, he led Jimmie Noone's Apex Club Orchestra, a Chicago band that recorded for Vocalion and Decca. Classical composer Maurice Ravel acknowledged basing his Boléro on an improvisation by Noone. At the time of his death Noone was leading a quartet in Los Angeles and was part of an all-star band that was reviving interest in traditional New Orleans jazz in the 1940s.

== Early life ==
James Noone was born on April 23, 1895, near the Stanton Plantation in New Orleans, Louisiana to Lucene Daggs and James Noone. All of his grandparents were slaves. His father James either left the family or died before Noone was 5 years old. In 1910, Noone's family moved to Saint Bernard Parish, Louisiana. Noone switched to the clarinet and studied with Lorenzo Tio, and the young Sidney Bechet.

== Later life and career ==
=== 1913–1942 ===
In 1913, Noone was playing professionally with Freddie Keppard, in Storyville, replacing Bechet. In 1916, when Keppard went on tour, Noone and Buddie Petit formed the Young Olympia Band, and Noone led a small ensemble (clarinet, piano, drums) unusual for its time.

In 1917, Noone played with Kid Ory and Oscar Celestin until the Storyville district was permanently closed. He rejoined Keppard and the Original Creole Orchestra on the vaudeville circuit until the group broke up the following year.

In 1918, Noone moved to Chicago, Illinois, where he studied with symphony clarinetist Franz Schoepp. He played for two years (1918–1920) at Chicago's Royal Garden Cafe with Paul Barbarin (drums), King Oliver, Bill Johnson (bass), Lottie Taylor (piano) and Eddie Vinson (trombone). In 1920, Noone joined Keppard in Doc Cook's dance orchestra, in which he played saxophone and clarinet for six years. Noone was a brother-in-law of both Barbarin and Keppard.

In 1926, Noone began to lead the band at the Apex Club, at 330 E. 35th Street, one of a wealth of Jazz Age clubs on Chicago's South Side. Jimmie Noone's Apex Club Orchestra had an unusual instrumentation—a front line consisting of clarinet and alto saxophone (Joe Poston, who worked with Noone in Doc Cook's band), with piano (Earl Hines), drums (Ollie Powers, succeeded by Johnny Wells in 1928) and guitar (Bud Scott).

Noone signed with Brunswick Records in May 1928 and was assigned to their Vocalion label. The first session yielded "Four or Five Times" backed with "Every Evening (I Miss You)" (Vocalion 1185), which was a best seller.

"The quintet which Noone brought to Vocalion was unique in that it preserved New Orleans' musical concepts without using brass instruments," wrote jazz historian Richard Hadlock in his notes to Decca's 1994 remastered reissue of the 1928–1929 Apex Club Orchestra recordings. "Joe Poston and Noone took turns playing a loose, melodic lead and the powerful right hand of Hines was often blended into the front line to plump up the harmony...Noone seemed to keep one foot in traditional New Orleans bandsmanship and the other in the new movement toward virtuoso swing solo playing."

Noone inspired Maurice Ravel's 1928 composition, Boléro. Benny Goodman was among the teenage musicians often seen at the Apex Club. "He absorbed in his own playing the beautiful tone and sparkling flow of Jimmie Noone", wrote John S. Wilson, music critic for The New York Times. Not yet ten years old, Nat King Cole listened to Noone's band on the radio, and he would sneak out his window to sit in the alley outside the nightclub and listen to Noone and Hines. Some ten years later, when a customer badgered Cole to sing along with his instrumental trio, the first song he sang was "Sweet Lorraine", Noone's theme song.

Noone remained in Chicago, working at the Apex Club until it was raided and shut down in 1929, and then worked at other Chicago clubs throughout the next decade. He recorded with Doc Cook's band as well as his own. In 1931, Noone left Chicago for a month at the Savoy Ballroom, and in 1935 he briefly moved to New York City, to start a band and a (short-lived) club with Wellman Braud. He made long tours around the country, including performances in New Orleans.

Noone remained with Brunswick through 1935 (mostly on Vocalion, but also had a number of records issued on Brunswick) and then signed with Decca in early 1936 and one session each for Decca in 1936, 1937 and 1940. He did one session for Bluebird also in 1940.

With swing music dominating jazz, Noone tried leading a big band—singer Joe Williams made his professional debut in 1937 with the group—but he went back to his small-ensemble format.

=== 1943–1944 ===
In 1943, Noone moved to Los Angeles, California, where a traditional New Orleans-style jazz revival was under way. He began to enjoy renewed popularity that year when the Brunswick Collectors Series reissued his 1928 Vocalion recordings in a Decca album set (B-1006) titled Jimmie Noone, Dean of Modern Hot Clarinetists – Apex Club, Chicago 1928, Volume 1.

Arriving in Los Angeles, Noone was confronted with a massive housing shortage due to the population boom associated with the war industry. On September 14, 1943, Ted LeBerthon of The Los Angeles Daily News wrote a column pleading for someone to rent or sell a home to Noone:

I noted that Benny Goodman, Artie Shaw or Woody Herman, three outstanding white jazz clarinetists and band leaders, would have found a home because, being white, they did not have to confine their search to a limited restricted area. Also, I pointed out, they made far bigger money because of being white, and could afford to pay a far higher rental. The situation, I observed, was cruelly ironic. For Hugues Panassié, the distinguished French music critic, in his book The Real Jazz, had acclaimed Jimmie Noone as the greatest clarinetist of all time, the possessor of a more beautiful, more poignant tone and a player able to summon more sensitive nuances than any other. The late Maurice Ravel, who acknowledged basing his Boléro on a Jimmie Noone improvisation, had publicly dared any symphonic clarinetist to perform Jimmie's technical feats. But in Los Angeles there was no place for Jimmie and his lovely wife, Rita.

The column brought about LeBerthon's dismissal after seven years with the Daily News.

Noone's wife (born Rita Mary Mathieu, 1912–1980) and their three children had to move back to Chicago while Noone continued to look for a place for them to live. In addition to it being a burdensome expense for the musician, LeBurthon later reported that the stress on Noone aggravated a cardiac ailment that had emerged during the Depression years. By February 1944, however, Noone was able to find a home in Los Angeles for his family and after some delays they were reunited.

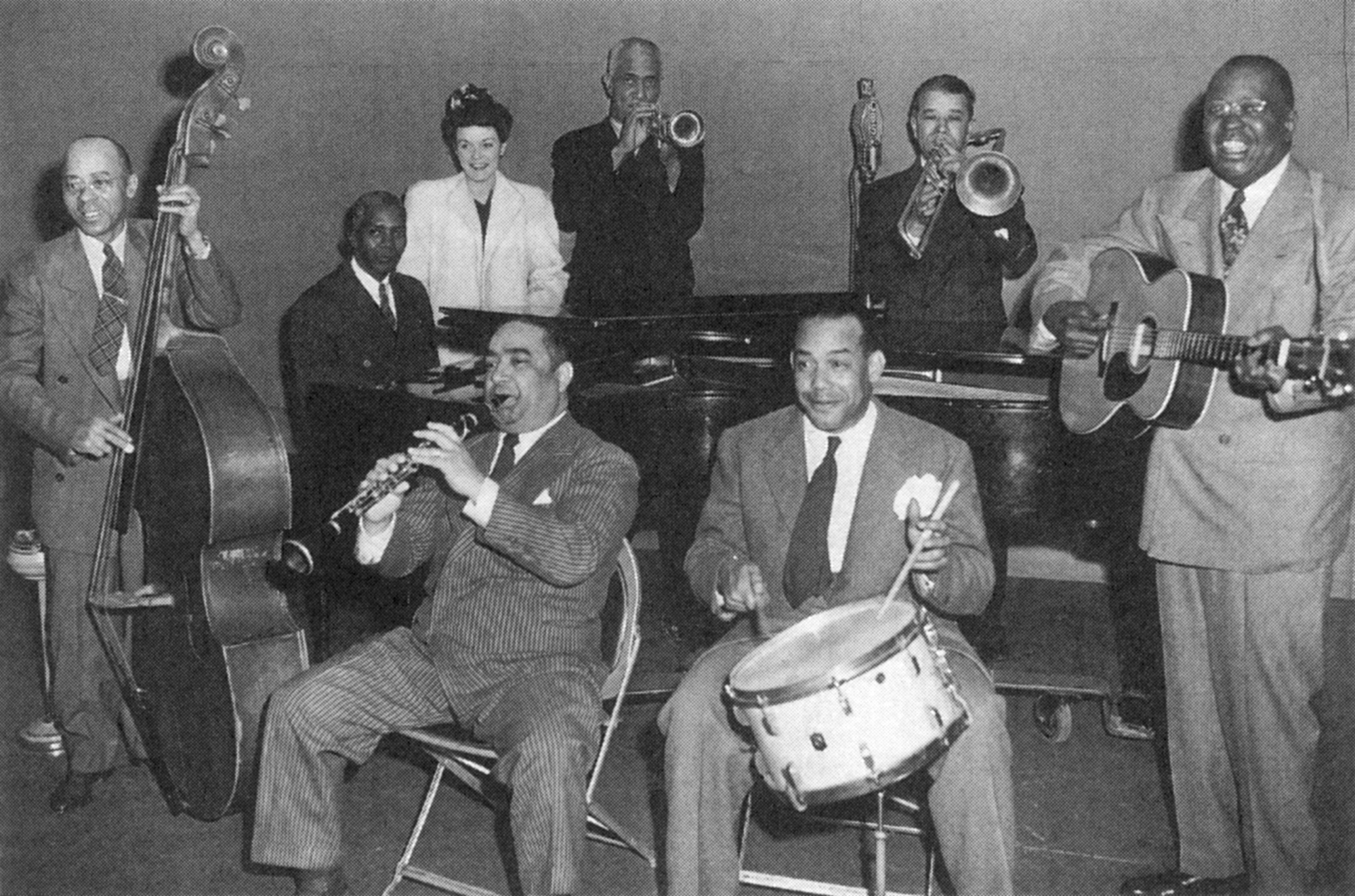
The All Star Jazz Group, left to right: Ed Garland (bass), Buster Wilson (piano), Marili Morden (proprietor, Jazz Man Records), Jimmie Noone (clarinet), Mutt Carey (trumpet), Zutty Singleton (drums), Kid Ory (trombone), Bud Scott (guitar)

On March 15, 1944, Noone made his first appearance with an all-star band featured on CBS Radio's The Orson Welles Almanac—a band that was an important force in reviving interest in New Orleans jazz. A passionate and knowledgeable fan of traditional jazz, Orson Welles asked Marili Morden of Hollywood's Jazz Man Record Shop to put together an authentic jazz band for his radio show. Within minutes she assembled Mutt Carey (trumpet), Ed Garland (bass), Kid Ory (trombone), Bud Scott (guitar), Zutty Singleton (drums), Buster Wilson (piano), and Jimmie Noone (clarinet). Other than Singleton, Noone was the only band member who was working regularly, performing with his own quartet at the Streets of Paris in Hollywood. Their performances on the Welles show were so popular that the band became a regular feature and launched Ory's comeback.

Noone performed on four broadcasts of The Orson Welles Almanac. On the morning of the fifth broadcast, April 19, 1944, Noone suddenly died at home of a heart attack, aged 48. Welles telephoned Kid Ory and told him of Noone's death, and asked him to write a blues that could be performed for that evening's radio program. "See if you can work one up," Welles said. "We'll call it 'Blues for Jimmie'."

In 1952, Ory reflected on writing the tune, which by then was regarded a classic. "I got up right away and began blowing some blues on my horn. I was real sad; Jimmie was my best friend," Ory said. "I found a man to fill in for Jimmie on clarinet. Then I got the band together that afternoon and we rehearsed the tune. On the show that night Mr. Welles explained the situation over the air. I don't mind saying that when we played 'Blues for Jimmie' all the musicians in the band were crying. So was Mr. Welles, and the audience, too."

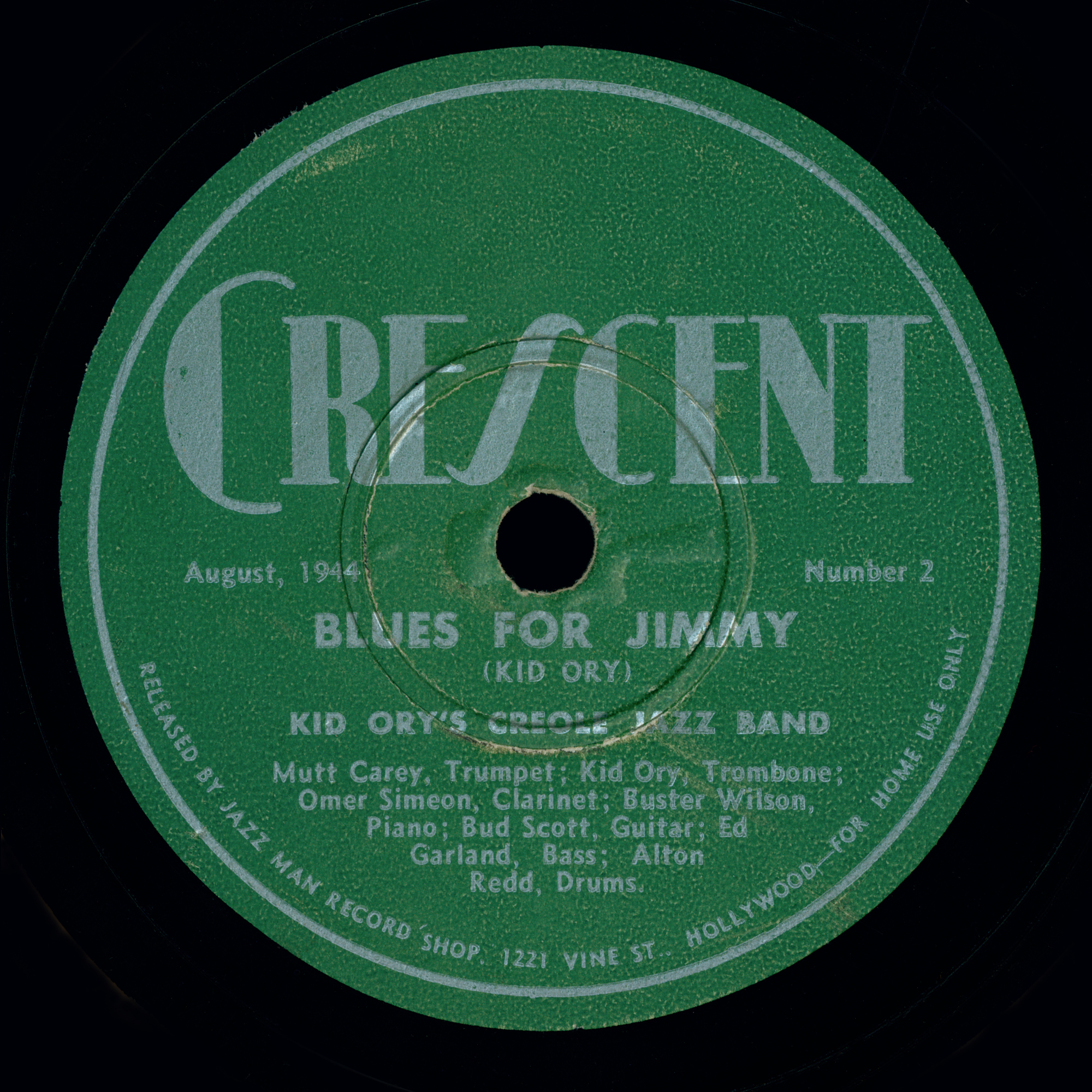
Kid Ory's Creole Jazz Band recording of "Blues for Jimmie" (misspelled "Jimmy") on Crescent Records (August 1944)

On the program that evening, Welles spoke extemporaneously for three minutes about Noone while Buster Wilson and Bud Scott, a member of Jimmie Noone's Apex Club Orchestra, played "Sweet Lorraine" in the background. "That was his theme, remember?" Welles said. As he did every time the All Star Jazz Group appeared, Welles introduced each musician by name, and that night he introduced New Orleans-born clarinetist Wade Whaley, sitting in for Noone.

"Blues for Jimmie" became a regular feature for Kid Ory's Creole Jazz Band, and they recorded it for Crescent Records in August 1944.

Until a few nights before his death Noone continued to perform with own quartet. He signed with Capitol Records in March 1944 and his last recordings were made for Capitol's New American Jazz album (Capitol A-3, August 1944), produced by Dave Dexter, Jr. Dexter called Noone "a gracious, personable and musicianly artist—one whose devotion to the early New Orleans style of playing was ever apparent—and with his passing the profession lost another of its pioneers."

In August 1944, the Musicians Congress sponsored a memorial concert at the Trocadero in Noone's honor, and for the benefit of his family. Featured artists included the All Star Jazz Group, Calvin Jackson, Wingy Manone, Johnny Mercer, the Nicholas Brothers, Earl Robinson, Rex Stewart, Joe Sullivan and Dooley Wilson. Albert Dekker was master of ceremonies.

== Discography ==
Jimmie Noone's Apex Club Orchestra was recorded in Chicago. Personnel include Jimmie Noone (clarinet), Joe Poston (alto saxophone), Earl Hines (piano), Bud Scott (banjo and guitar) and Johnny Wells (drums). The August 1928 sessions also include Lawson Buford (tuba).

- New Orleans Jazz (Olympic, 1975)
- Chicago Dixieland in the Forties (Smithsonian Folkways, 1981)
- Oh! Sister, Ain't That Hot (Jazz Heritage Series, 1983)
- Apex Blues (Decca, 1994)

== Legacy ==
Noone is generally regarded as one of the greatest of the second generation of jazz clarinetists, along with Johnny Dodds and Sidney Bechet. Noone's playing is not as blues-tinged as Dodds nor as flamboyant as Bechet, but is perhaps more lyrical and sophisticated, and certainly makes more use of "sweet" flavoring. Noone was an important influence on later clarinetists such as Artie Shaw, Irving Fazola and Benny Goodman.

Jimmie Noone and His Orchestra make a brief appearance in the East Side Kids feature film, Block Busters (1944), released three months after Noone's death. The quartet performs excerpts of "Apex Blues" and "Boogie Woogie".

Noone's discography concluded with recordings of his performances on The Orson Welles Almanac in March and April 1944. Several albums collect all of the live performances (also available on the Internet Archive), and a few collect most of Welles's introductions of the band, including his eulogy for Jimmie Noone.

Nesuhi Ertegun founded Crescent Records—the first record label he created—with the express purpose of recording the All Star Jazz Band featured on The Orson Welles Almanac. Jimmie Noone died before any recording had begun. With the exception of Zutty Singleton, who had other commitments, the rest of the group stayed together and was renamed Kid Ory's Creole Jazz Band by Ertegun. The second disc released by Crescent Records features "Blues for Jimmie", recorded in August 1944.

Jimmie Noone, Jr. (1938–1991), the oldest of Noone's three children, was a jazz clarinetist who made his professional debut in 1964. He made an album with John R. T. Davies in 1985 and began working with Jeannie and Jimmy Cheatham's Sweet Baby Blues Band in 1984. Noone made five albums with The Cheathams and taught jazz in the San Diego public school system from 1967 to 1984. He died of a heart seizure in 1991, aged 52.

"Blues My Naughty Sweetie Gives to Me" (1928) is featured on the soundtrack of Woody Allen's 2013 film, Blue Jasmine. His tune, "Way Down Yonder In New Orleans" (1936), is featured in the 2014 French film Une heure de tranquillité but attributed to a fictional clarinetist named Niel Youart on his 1958 album Me, Myself and I.
