= The Orson Welles Almanac =

1944 radio series

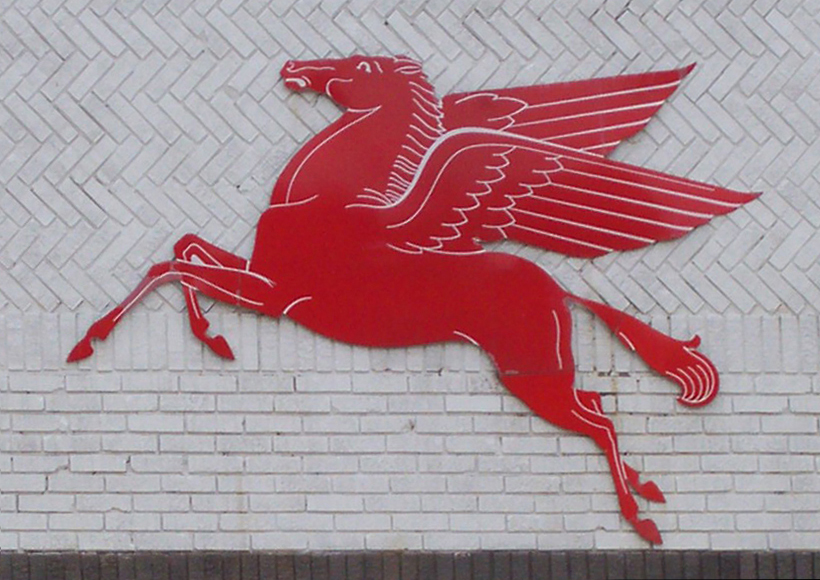
- Announcer: Welcome, one and all, to the Sign of the Flying Red Horse!
- Other names: Radio Almanac; The Orson Welles Comedy Show
- Genre: Variety
- Running time: 30 minutes
- Country of origin: United States
- Language: English
- Home station: CBS
- Hosted by: Orson Welles
- Starring: Orson Welles; Arthur Q. Bryan; Ray Collins; Hans Conreid; Agnes Moorehead; All Star Jazz Group; Lud Gluskin and His Orchestra
- Written by: Orson Welles; Bud Pearson; Lon Quinn; Les White
- Directed by: Orson Welles
- Produced by: Harry Essman
- Original release: January 26 – July 19, 1944
- No. of series: 1
- No. of episodes: 26

The Orson Welles Almanac (also known as Radio Almanac and The Orson Welles Comedy Show) is a 1944 CBS Radio series directed and hosted by Orson Welles. Broadcast live on the Columbia Pacific Network, the 30-minute variety program was heard Wednesdays at 9:30 p.m. ET January 26 – July 19, 1944. The series was sponsored by Mobilgas and Mobiloil. Many of the shows originated from U.S. military camps, where Welles and his repertory company and guests entertained the troops with a reduced version of The Mercury Wonder Show. The performances of the all-star jazz band that Welles brought together for the show were an important force in the revival of traditional New Orleans jazz in the 1940s.

== Production ==
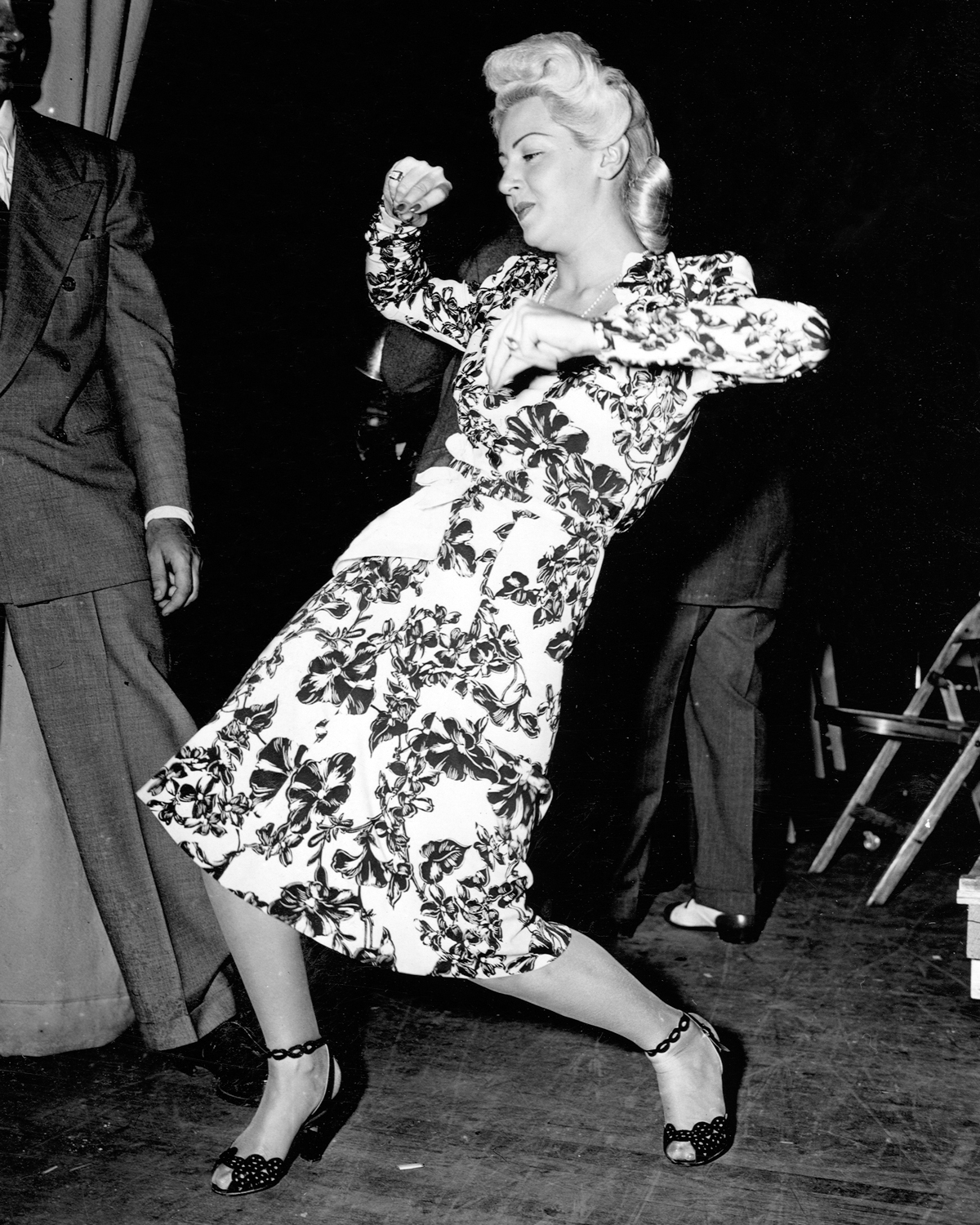
Lana Turner performing in the "Mercury Wonder Show" broadcast from the Los Angeles Port of Embarkation in Wilmington (July 5, 1944)

"The Orson Welles Almanac was a format that intrigued Welles throughout the early 1940s," wrote radio historian John Dunning. "It consisted of everything from odd facts to jazz."

The idea of doing such a variety show occurred to Welles after his success as substitute host of The Jack Benny Program, radio's most popular show. When Jack Benny contracted pneumonia on a performance tour of military bases, Welles hosted four consecutive programs (March 14–April 4, 1943) and was Benny's first guest when he returned to the show April 11, 1943.

Orson Welles's variety show was auditioned in New York December 2, 1943, with the Compton advertising agency representing Mobilgas. The cast included Welles (host) and Duke Ellington (music), with guest spots by Rita Hayworth and Jimmy Durante on an audition record. Billboard reported that plans were under way for scheduling the show.

The 30-minute program was heard Wednesdays at 9:30 p.m. ET January 26 – July 19, 1944. The wartime variety show presented readings from classic works, drama, music, sketch comedy, magic, mindreading and personal commentary by Welles. Many of the shows originated from U.S. military camps where Welles and his repertory company and guests entertained the troops with a reduced version of The Mercury Wonder Show. The program aired on the Columbia Pacific Network, heard in California and neighboring states, but no further east than Denver.

"Originating in Los Angeles, the program was only aired regionally, not at all in New York," wrote Welles biographer Bret Wood. "Had it been a major network presentation, there might have been enough publicity to build a successful program, for the content and production are both of a quality far above the norm."

Welles had an ongoing battle with the program's sponsor, Mobil, which shortened the life of the series. For example, Welles bristled at a suggestion that if Duke Ellington appeared on the show he should play the role of Welles's servant.

Twenty-six broadcasts were produced; all but three shows have survived in private collections and in the Welles archives at the Lilly Library.

=== All Star Jazz Group ===
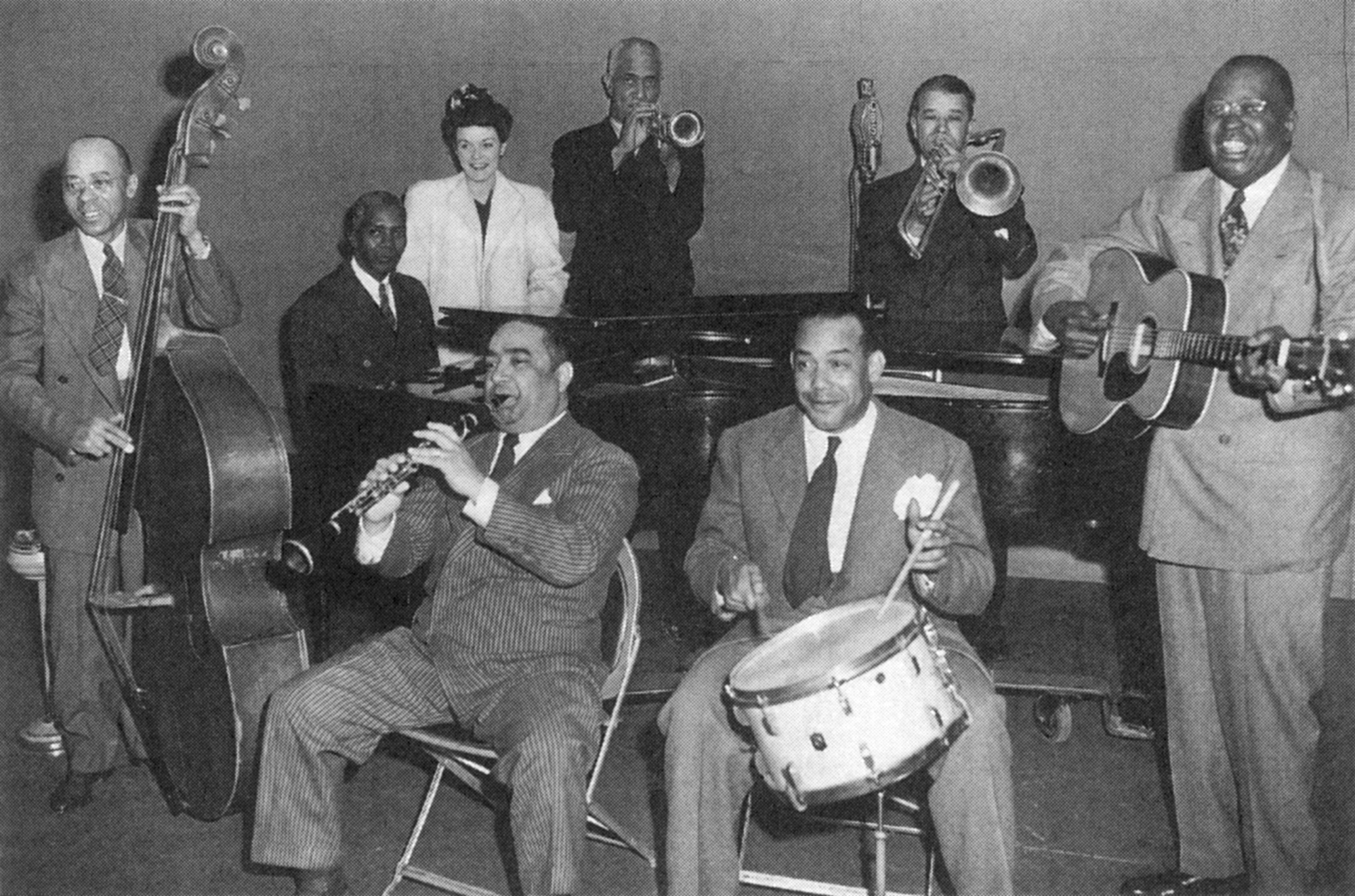
The All Star Jazz Group, left to right: Ed Garland (bass), Buster Wilson (piano), Marili Morden (proprietor, Jazz Man Records), Jimmie Noone (clarinet), Mutt Carey (trumpet), Zutty Singleton (drums), Kid Ory (trombone), Bud Scott (guitar)

A passionate and knowledgeable fan of traditional New Orleans jazz, Welles was part of the social network of Hollywood's Jazz Man Record Shop, a business that opened in 1939 and was instrumental in the worldwide revival of original jazz in the 1940s. In February 1944 Welles asked Marili Morden, proprietor of Jazz Man Records, to put together an authentic jazz band for The Orson Welles Almanac. (Note: In 1941, Welles had employed Morden's first husband, Jazz Man Records founder David Stuart, as a consultant on the jazz segment of his ill-fated film, It's All True.)

Within minutes Morden assembled Mutt Carey (trumpet), Ed Garland (bass), Jimmie Noone (clarinet), Kid Ory (trombone), Bud Scott (guitar), Zutty Singleton (drums) and Buster Wilson (piano). Noone and Singleton were the only two musicians who were working regularly. The Depression and the popularity of swing and big band music had forced many jazz musicians out of the business. When Morden and her first husband, Jazz Man founder David Stuart, first discovered Ory in Los Angeles in 1940, he had been retired from music for seven years. He had been sorting mail at the post office, working on his brother's chicken ranch, and gardening at his home. When clarinetist Barney Bigard asked him to join his band in 1942, Ory was sweeping out the city morgue for $12 a week. "I guess, to be truthful, that there was a lot of New Orleans dixieland players working that couldn't find a job for years," Bigard recalled.

"I'll never forget the first day the band rehearsed," recalled Nesuhi Ertegun, who became Morden's business partner and later her husband:

Welles came into the studio with his entourage and asked me to introduce him to the musicians. I took him around to everyone. But Ory was hard of hearing. He said, "What'd you say the name was?" I thought to myself, "Well, we're out of this job now." But Welles said, "Mr. Ory, I'm a great admirer of yours, I have all your records and those where you play with Louis Armstrong and the Hot Seven."

Welles became friends with each of the musicians and the band rehearsed at his home before each show. The All Star Jazz Group (which Welles often called the All Star Jazz Combination or the Mercury All Star Jazz Combination) first performed on The Orson Welles Almanac on March 15, 1944. Its last performance was July 12, 1944, on the penultimate show in the series. The performances on Welles's show were so popular that the band became a regular feature, launched Ory's comeback, and was an important force in reviving interest in New Orleans jazz.

On the morning of the fifth broadcast, April 19, 1944, Jimmie Noone suddenly died at home of a heart attack, aged 48. Welles telephoned Ory and told him of Noone's death, and asked him to write a blues that could be performed for that evening's radio program. "See if you can work one up," Welles said. "We'll call it 'Blues for Jimmie'."

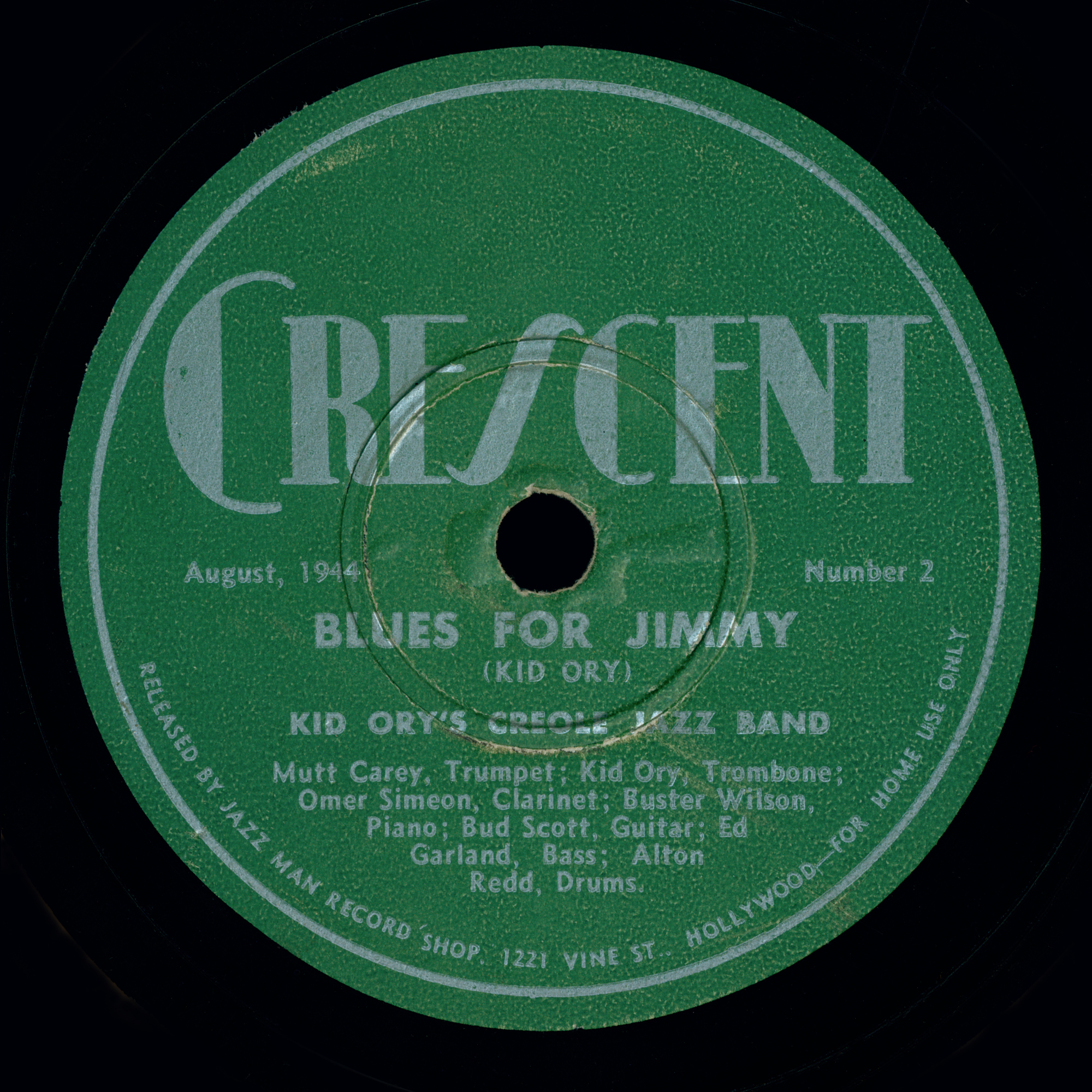
Crescent Records Number 2 featured "Blues for Jimmie" (misspelled "Jimmy" on the label), recorded August 3, 1944

In 1952 Ory reflected on writing the tune, which had become a regular feature for his band and was regarded a classic. "I got up right away and began blowing some blues on my horn. I was real sad; Jimmie was my best friend," Ory said. "I found a man to fill in for Jimmie on clarinet. Then I got the band together that afternoon and we rehearsed the tune. On the show that night Mr. Welles explained the situation over the air. I don't mind saying that when we played 'Blues for Jimmie' all the musicians in the band were crying. So was Mr. Welles, and the audience, too."

On the program that evening, Welles spoke extemporaneously for three minutes about Noone while Buster Wilson and Bud Scott played "Sweet Lorraine", Noone's theme song, in the background. As he did every time the All Star Jazz Group appeared, Welles introduced each musician by name, and that night he introduced New Orleans-born clarinetist Wade Whaley, sitting in for Noone.

Clarinetist Barney Bigard was brought in to play with the All Star Jazz Group for the remainder of the series. Bigard called Welles "a real swell fellow. He loved jazz and had a great knowledge of it. We used to go up to his house after the broadcasts and he would tell me things about my career that I had forgotten myself."

Nesuhi Ertegun founded his first record label, Crescent Records, with the express purpose of recording the All Star Jazz Group featured on The Orson Welles Almanac. Only eight discs were released on the Crescent label, all of them recorded August–November 1944 by the group Ertegun renamed Kid Ory's Creole Jazz Band.

"Viewed in perspective," Ertegun later wrote, "they are among the most significant jazz records ever made: they gave eloquent proof of the continuing vitality of New Orleans jazz at a time when such proof was needed."

=== "With Your Wings" ===
Broadcast July 19, 1944, from the Coast Guard camp in Long Beach, California, the final episode of The Orson Welles Almanac ends with a five-minute reading by Welles, "a short story, especially written for me to broadcast by one of the first talents in American literature, John Steinbeck." The story, "With Your Wings", relates the homecoming of a decorated pilot, later revealed to be black, and his realization of the meaning that his achievement has for his family and community. (Note: Welles's introduction and Steinbeck's story appear on pages 20–23 [55–60] of the bound radio script seen on Lilly Library's website Orson Welles on the Air, 1938–1946. The reading begins at 24:03 of the broadcast.) Virtually forgotten, the story was unpublished until November 2014, after a transcript of the broadcast was found in the archives of the University of Texas at Austin by the managing editor of The Strand Magazine. "With Your Wings" was published in the quarterly magazine's holiday issue.

Welles had previously presented "With Your Wings" January 25, 1943, on his CBS radio series Ceiling Unlimited. The script and recording are included with the Orson Welles materials at the Lilly Library.

== Episodes ==
#	Date	Program
1	January 26, 1944	Guest: Groucho Marx; Lud Gluskin and His Orchestra play "I Know That You Know"; Martha Stewart sings "Bésame Mucho"; Welles reads some of Thomas Paine's thoughts on liberty Cast: Orson Welles, Arthur Q. Bryan (Mr. Trivers, the censor), Lud Gluskin and His Orchestra, Ray Collins (commercial spokesman for Mobilgas and Mobiloil), Agnes Moorehead (Miss Grimace, the secretary)
2	February 2, 1944	Guest: Lionel Barrymore; Skit, "The Kiddies' Corner"; Swing music ("Speak Low") and a birthday tribute to Victor Herbert by Lud Gluskin and His Orchestra; Barrymore reads from the writings of George Washington; Cast: Orson Welles, Jack Mather (announcer), Lud Gluskin and His Orchestra, Hans Conried, Agnes Moorehead
3	February 9, 1944	Guest: Ann Sothern; Reading, "Abraham Lincoln, The Prairie Years" by Carl Sandburg
4	February 16, 1944	Guest: Robert Benchley; Lecture, "The History of Eskimo Love," by Robert Benchley; Reading, "Colloquy for the States" by Archibald MacLeish
5	February 23, 1944	Guest: Hedda Hopper; The King Cole Trio performs "Hit that Jive, Jack"; Reading, The Sword in the Stone by T. H. White; Cast: Orson Welles, Agnes Moorehead, Hans Conreid, John McIntire, John Brown, Walter Tetley, Lud Gluskin and His Orchestra
6	March 1, 1944	Guest: Victor Moore; Reading, "Sacre du Printemps" (from Small Beer) by Ludwig Bemelmans; The King Cole Trio performs "Solid Potato Salad"; Cast: Orson Welles, Agnes Moorehead, Hans Conreid, John McIntire, John Brown, Walter Tetley, Lud Gluskin and His Orchestra
7	March 8, 1944	Guest: Lucille Ball; Lud Gluskin and His Orchestra play "Bésame Mucho"; Skit, Nick and Nora Charles parody, "The Case of the Blue Bloodstain"; Ella Mae Morse sings "Shoo-Shoo Baby"; Welles reads "No Man Is an Island" by John Donne; Cast: Orson Welles, Agnes Moorehead, Jack Mather, Hans Conried, Lud Gluskin and His Orchestra
8	March 15, 1944	Guest: Charles Laughton; Lud Gluskin and His Orchestra play "I'll Get By"; Skit: "The Private Life of Charles Laughton"; Tent scene from William Shakespeare's Julius Caesar, with Charles Laughton (Cassius) and Orson Welles (Brutus) "High Society" performed by Kid Ory (trombone), Mutt Carey (trumpet), Jimmie Noone (clarinet), Buster Wilson (piano), Bud Scott (guitar), Ed Garland (bass) and Zutty Singleton (drums); Cast: Orson Welles, Agnes Moorehead, John McIntire (announcer), Hans Conried, Lud Gluskin and His Orchestra
9	March 22, 1944	Guest: Betty Hutton; Reading, "Ballad of Bataan" by Norman Rosten; Cast: Orson Welles, Agnes Moorehead, John McIntire, Hans Conried, Lud Gluskin and His Orchestra
10	March 29, 1944	Guest: Mary Boland; Skit: Parody of Lady in the Dark "Muskrat Ramble" performed by the All Star Jazz Group — Kid Ory (trombone), Jimmie Noone (clarinet), Mutt Carey (trumpet), Buster Wilson (piano), Bud Scott (guitar), Ed Garland (bass) and Zutty Singleton (drums); Marking the birthday of Edmond Rostand, an adaptation of Cyrano de Bergerac by Ben Hecht; Cast: Orson Welles, Hans Conreid, Lud Gluskin and His Orchestra
11	April 5, 1944	Guest: Dennis Day "That's a Plenty" performed by the All Star Jazz Group — Kid Ory (trombone), Jimmie Noone (clarinet), Mutt Carey (trumpet), Buster Wilson (piano), Bud Scott (guitar), Ed Garland (bass) and Zutty Singleton (drums); Dennis Day sings "Bésame Mucho"; Orson Welles reads the speech, "Oh what a rogue and peasant slave," from Hamlet
12	April 12, 1944	Guest: Monty Woolley; Skit, "The Life of Monty Woolley" "Panama" performed by the All Star Jazz Group — Jimmie Noone (clarinet), Kid Ory (trombone), Mutt Carey (trumpet), Bud Scott (guitar), Ed Garland (bass), Buster Wilson (piano) and Zutty Singleton (drums); Welles reads from Paul's First Epistle to the Corinthians; Cast: Orson Welles, Agnes Moorehead, Hans Conreid, John Brown, Lud Gluskin and His Orchestra, John McIntire, Billy Gilbert
13	April 19, 1944	Guest: George Jessel; As the All Star Jazz Group plays "Sweet Lorraine" in the background, Orson Welles speaks extemporaneously for three minutes about clarinetist Jimmie Noone, who died that morning at age 48 "Blues for Jimmie" performed by the All Star Jazz Group — Kid Ory (trombone), Ed Garland (bass), Zutty Singleton (drums), Wade Whaley (substitute clarinet), Buster Wilson (piano) and Bud Scott (guitar) (Note: Although this episode is lost, Welles's introduction (track 9) and the All Star Jazz Group performance of "Blues for Jimmie" (track 10) can be heard on the Upbeat CD, Kid Ory — Portrait of the Greatest Slideman Ever Born (URCD187)); Welles recites Psalm 23; This episode is lost
14	April 26, 1944	Guest: Carole Landis; Orson Welles reads the scene from the last act of Macbeth; Samba "Sugar Foot Stomp" performed by the New Orleans All Star Jazz Combination (Note: Although this episode is lost, Welles's introduction (track 11) and the All Star Jazz Group performance of "Sugar Foot Stomp" (track 12, including Bud Scott's shout, "Oh play that thing!) can be heard on the Upbeat CD, Kid Ory — Portrait of the Greatest Slideman Ever Born (URCD187)); This episode is lost
15	May 3, 1944	"This is The Mercury Wonder Show … and we pitched our tents tonight at the Naval Air Station at Terminal Island"; Guest: Lucille Ball; Aurora Miranda sings "No Tabuleiro da Baiana", with Welles joining her briefly in duet Orson Welles reads the honor speech from Henry V "Savoy Blues" performed by the All Star Jazz Group — Kid Ory (trombone), Mutt Carey (trumpet), Barney Bigard (clarinet), Buster Wilson (piano), Bud Scott (guitar), Ed Garland (bass) and Zutty Singleton (drums)
16	May 10, 1944	Broadcast from the U.S. Army Air Force Redistribution Center in Santa Monica, California; Guests: Jimmy Durante, Aurora Miranda "Woodrow Wilson"; This episode is lost
17	May 17, 1944	Guest: Ann Sothern; Skit, "Ann Sothern for President", with Welles first as her campaign manager (duet, "Sittin' on the Fence") and, after commercial, as Orson Sothern, First Gentleman of the land in 1964 "Weary Blues" performed by the All Star Jazz Group — Mutt Carey (trumpet), Kid Ory (trombone), Barney Bigard (clarinet), Buster Wilson (piano), Bud Scott (guitar), Ed Garland (bass) and Zutty Singleton (drums); Romeo's last scene from Romeo and Juliet, with Welles (Romeo) and Hans Conreid (Paris)
18	May 24, 1944	Broadcast from the Air Service Command Training Center, Fresno, California; The Mercury Wonder Show — "See the greatest magic show you've ever listened to" Guests: Lee and Lyn Wilde, Lois Collier "Blues in E flat" performed by the All Star Jazz Group and vocalist Helen Andrews; Orson Welles reads a famous open letter in defense of Father Damien
19	May 31, 1944	"Good evening everybody, this is Orson Welles. Welcome to the Mercury Wonder Show. Tonight we've pitched our tents at the Sixth Ferrying Group, Ferrying Division, of the Air Transport Command at Long Beach, California."; Guest: Marjorie Reynolds; Skit, "What a Typical G.I. Soldier Does On Leave"; Martha Tilton sings "Take It Easy"; Spoof of the recent Suspense broadcast of Donovan's Brain "Tiger Rag" performed by the Mercury All Star Jazz Combination; Orson Welles reads the sonnet "High Flight" by John Gillespie Magee, Jr.
20	June 7, 1944	Special D-Day broadcast dramatizing the lives of various Americans when they hear of the Normandy landings Cast: Agnes Moorehead, Hans Conried, Orson Welles (host), Lud Gluskin and His Orchestra, John McIntire (announcer)
21	June 14, 1944	Followup to the June 7 D-Day broadcast from Texarkana includes a skit about a fish peddler who causes a war between Texas and Arkansas; Lud Gluskin and His Orchestra perform Raymond Scott's "Powerhouse"; Welles reads Stephen Vincent Benét's A Prayer for the United Nations
22	June 21, 1944	Broadcast from the Wrigley Building, Chicago; Guest: Martha O'Driscoll; Ethel Waters sings "Stormy Weather"; Orson Welles reads a soliloquy from Richard II
23	June 28, 1944	Broadcast from Camp Haan in Riverside, California; Guest: Lynn Bari, assisting with a Mercury Wonder Show mindreading experiment and a Mercury Fable about a canteen for WACS; Martha Tilton sings "A Good Man" "Oh, Didn't He Ramble" performed by the Mercury All-Star Jazz Combination; Orson Welles reads from the Epistle of James
24	July 5, 1944	"Tonight the Mercury Wonder Show is pitching its tent at the Los Angeles Port of Embarkation in Wilmington"; Guests: Lana Turner, Keenan Wynn; Skit, a Mercury Fable about a soldier (Orson Welles, singing "You Made Me Love You") who is granted his wish for a magical visit from an invisible Lana Turner; The Mercury All-Star Jazz Combination and Lud Gluskin and His Orchestra play jive
25	July 12, 1944	"Tonight the Mercury Wonder Show is pitching its tent at Camp Cooke, near Lompoc, California"; Guest: Susan Hayward; Kay Thompson sings "Louisiana Purchase"; Skit, a WAC's furlough with her husband is disrupted by her family Orson Welles reads from Richard II "Royal Garden Blues" performed by the Mercury All Star Jazz Combination — Kid Ory (trombone), Zutty Singleton (drums), Bud Scott (guitar), Ed Garland (bass), Norman Bowden (trumpet) and Fred Washington (piano)
26	July 19, 1944	Broadcast from Long Beach Coast Guard Camp, California; Ruth Terry sings "Is You Is or Is You Ain't My Baby"; Skit, a Mercury Fable called "Life in the Coast Guard"; Miguelito Valdés sings "Babalú"; Reading, "With Your Wings" by John Steinbeck

== See also ==
- Orson Welles radio credits
