= William P. Gottlieb =

American photographer and journalist (1917–2006)

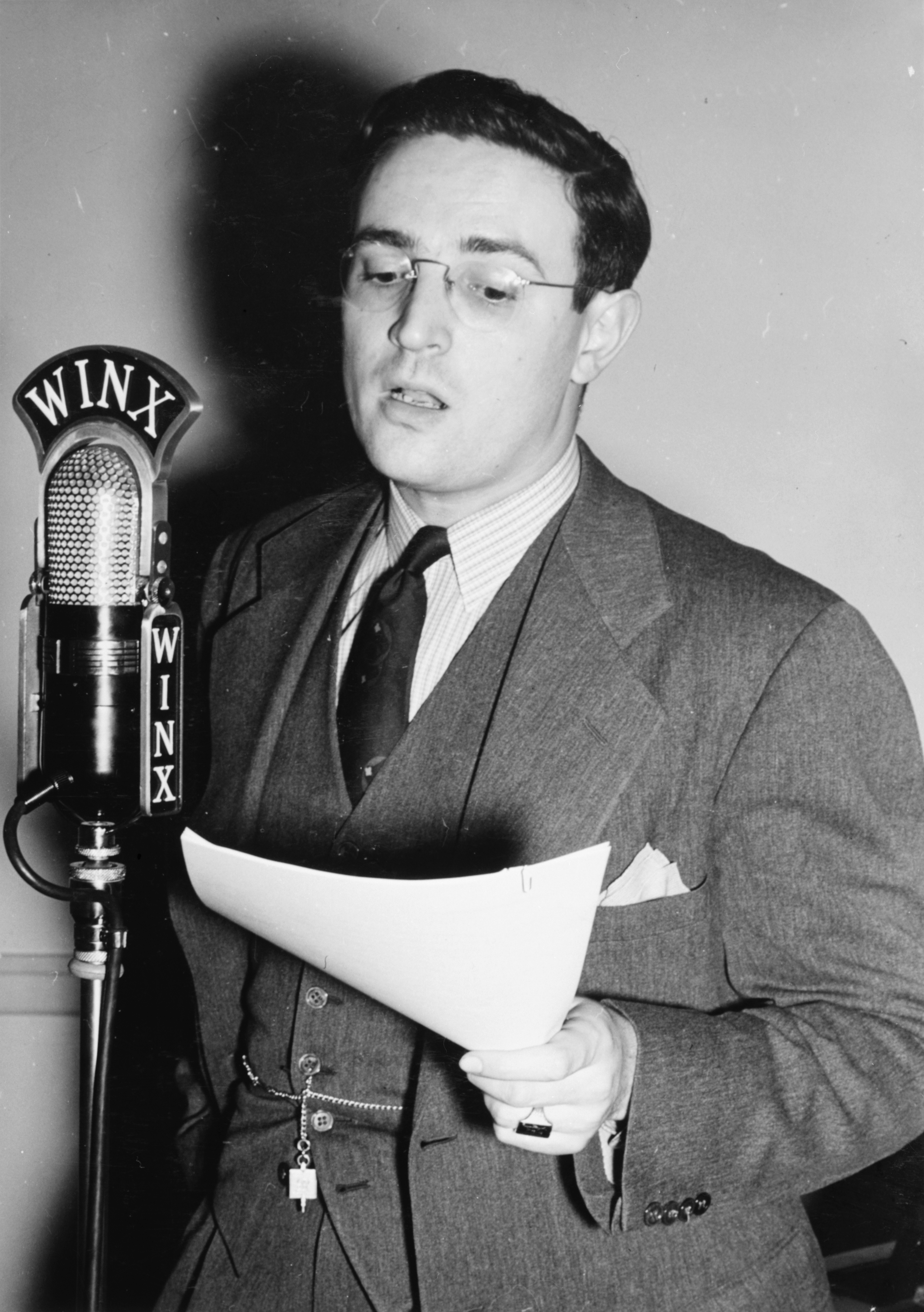
- Gottlieb at WINX radio station, Washington, c. 1940
- Born: William Paul Gottlieb; January 28, 1917; Brooklyn, New York, U.S.
- Died: April 23, 2006 (aged 89); Great Neck, New York, U.S.
- Education: Lehigh University
- Occupations: Photographer; journalist
- Employers: The Washington Post; University of Maryland; DownBeat
- Spouse: Delia Potofsky
- Children: 4
- Military career
- Allegiance: United States
- Branch: United States Army Air Corps
- Service years: 1943–1945
- Role: Photo officer
- Conflicts: World War II
- Gottlieb's voice Gottlieb speaking on his 1948 photograph of 52 Street, Manhattan; recorded in 1997

William Paul Gottlieb (January 28, 1917 – April 23, 2006) was an American photographer and newspaper columnist who is best known for his classic photographs of the leading performers of the golden age of jazz in the United States in the 1930s and 1940s. His photographs are among the best known and widely reproduced images of this jazz era.

Gottlieb took pictures of hundreds of prominent jazz musicians and personalities, typically while they were performing or singing at well-known New York City jazz clubs. His subjects included Louis Armstrong, Duke Ellington, Charlie Parker, Billie Holiday, Dizzy Gillespie, Earl Hines, Jo Stafford, Thelonious Monk, Stan Kenton, Ray McKinley, Benny Goodman, Coleman Hawkins, Louis Jordan, Ella Fitzgerald, Toots Thielemans, Cab Calloway, and Benny Carter, among others. In accordance with his wishes, Gottlieb's photographs were placed in the public domain in 2010; many are used in Wikipedia and other public-domain or freely-licensed venues.

== Early life, education, and early career ==
Gottlieb was born on January 28, 1917, in the Canarsie neighborhood of Brooklyn and grew up in Bound Brook, New Jersey, where his father was in the building and lumber business. In 1938, he graduated from Lehigh University in Bethlehem, Pennsylvania, with a degree in economics. While at Lehigh, Gottlieb wrote for the weekly campus newspaper and was the editor-in-chief of The Lehigh Review, and in his last year of college, he began writing a weekly jazz column for The Washington Post.

== Career and military service ==
While writing for The Washington Post, Gottlieb taught economics at the University of Maryland in College Park, Maryland, southwest of Baltimore. After the Post determined that it would not pay a photographer to accompany Gottlieb on his visits to jazz clubs, Gottlieb borrowed a press camera and began taking pictures for his column.

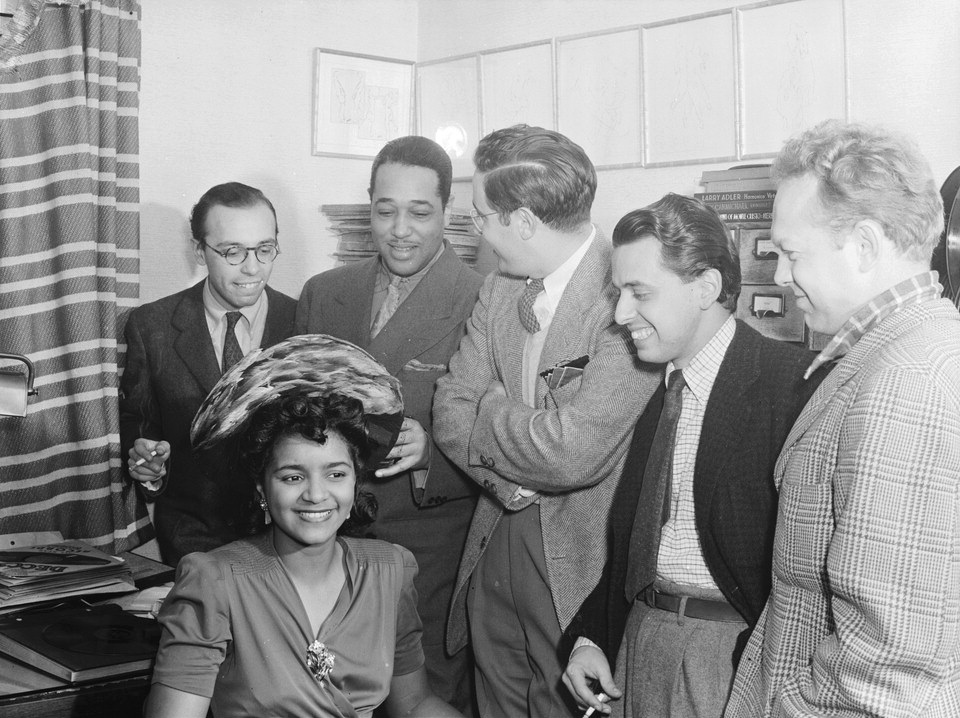
From left: Ahmet Ertegun, Duke Ellington, Gottlieb, Nesuhi Ertegun, Dave Stuart, and singer Ivie Anderson (seated) at Gottlieb's home in Maryland; photograph by Delia Potofsky Gottlieb

Gottlieb was drafted into the Army Air Corps in 1943 and served as a photography and a classifications officer. After World War II, Gottlieb moved to New York City to pursue a career in journalism. He worked as a writer-photographer for DownBeat magazine, and his work appeared frequently in Record Changer, the Saturday Review, and Collier's. In 1948, Gottlieb retired from jazz journalism in order to spend more time with his wife, Delia, and their children. After William left DownBeat, he began working at Curriculum Films, an educational filmstrip company. He founded his own filmstrip company which was later bought by McGraw Hill. Many of his filmstrips won awards from the Canadian Film Board and the Educational Film Librarians Association. He also wrote and illustrated children's books, including several Golden Books, among them The Four Seasons, Tigers Adventure, and Laddie the Superdog. He wrote educational books such as Science Facts You Won't Believe and Space Flight.

== Personal life and death ==
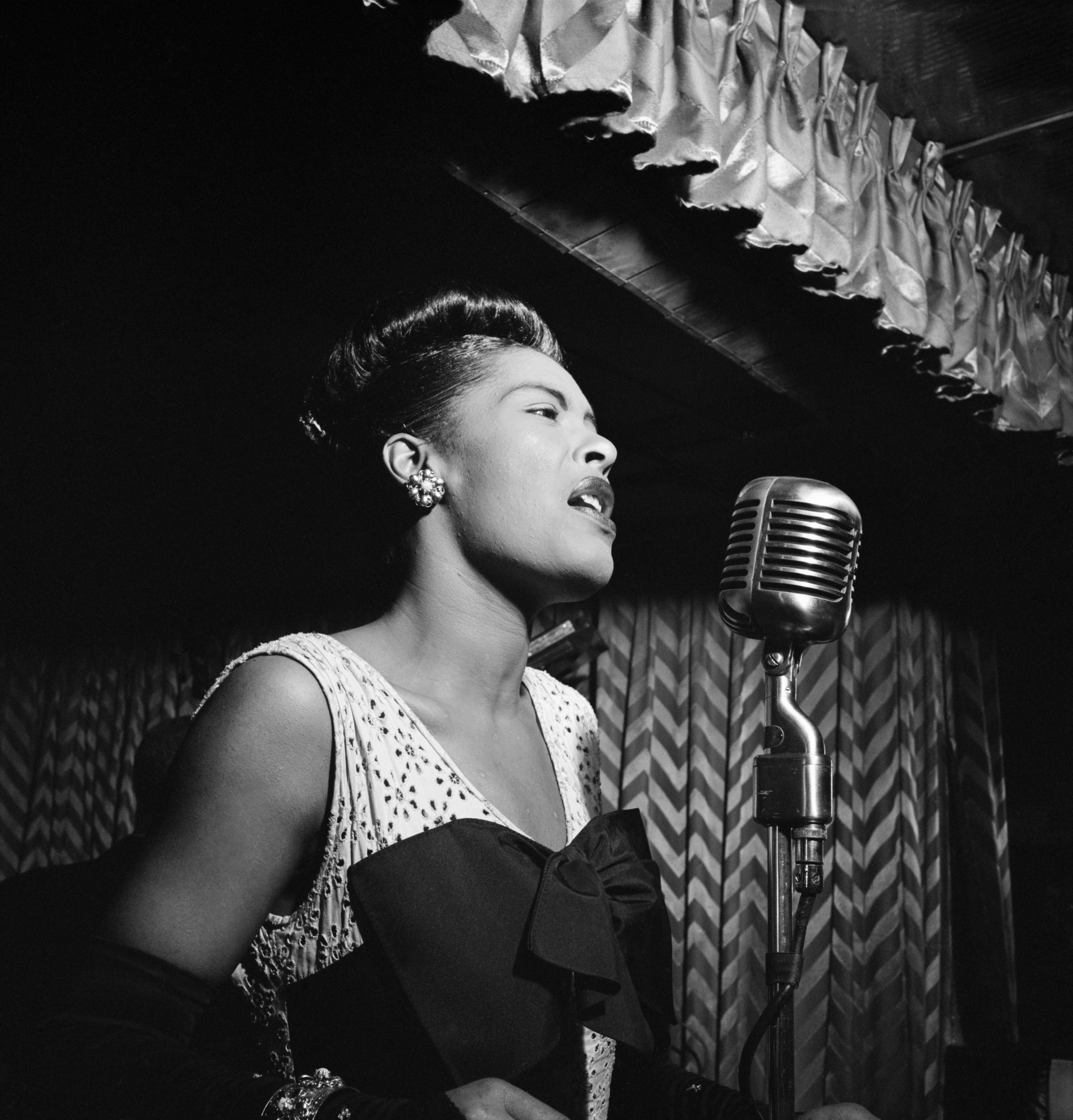
In 1947, Gottlieb photographed Billie Holiday at the Downbeat jazz club in New York City, resulting in this iconic portrait.

Apart from his photography career, Gottlieb also played amateur tennis. He and his son Steven were often ranked the number one father-and-son team on the East Coast and were twice ranked among the top ten teams in the U.S.

Gottlieb was married to Delia Potofsky, the daughter of Jacob Potofsky. They had four children: Barbara, Steven, Richard, and Edward.

Gottlieb died of complications from a stroke on April 23, 2006, in Great Neck, New York.
