= Jazz Man Records =

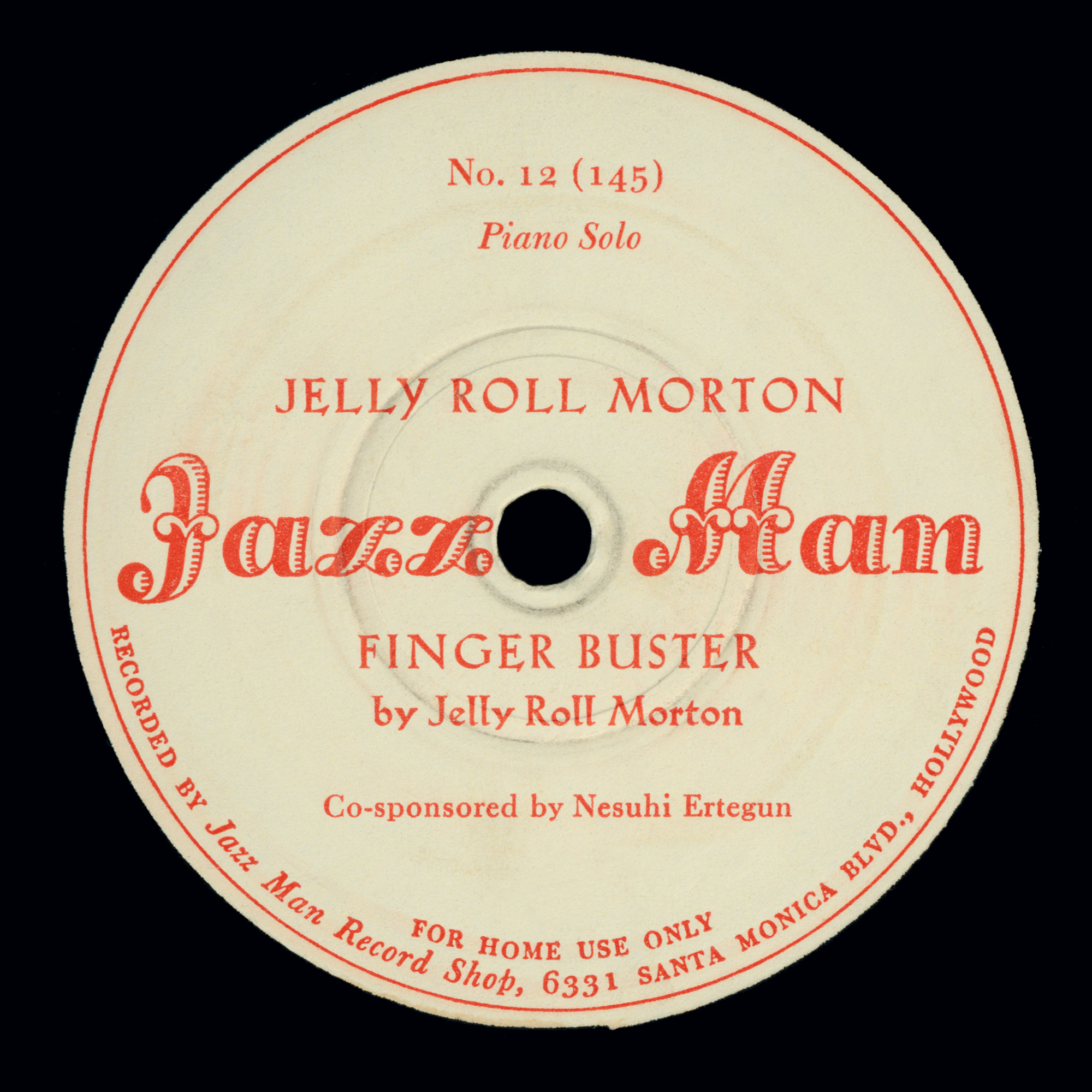
- "Finger Buster" by Jelly Roll Morton (1942)
- Founded: 1941
- Founder: David Stuart
- Genre: Jazz
- Country of origin: U.S.
- Location: Hollywood, California

Jazz Man Records was an American record company and independent record label devoted to traditional New Orleans-style jazz. David Stuart (né David Ashford Stuart; 1910–1984) founded the label in 1941 and sold it to his ex-wife, Marili Morden and her new husband, Nesuhi Ertegun. The label and its namesake – Jazz Man Record Shop, in Hollywood – were in the vanguard of an international revival of traditional jazz in the 1940s.

== History ==
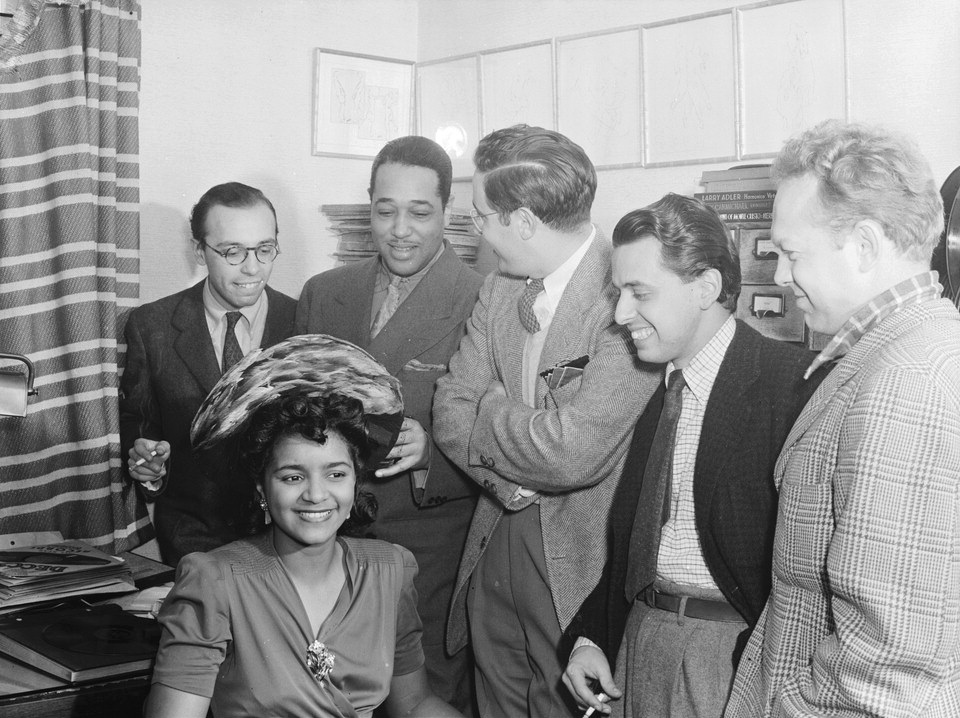
David Stuart (right) with Ahmet Ertegun, Duke Ellington, William P. Gottlieb, Nesuhi Ertegun and singer Ivie Anderson (1941)

Jazz Man Records was founded in 1941 by David Stuart, owner of the Jazz Man Record Shop in Hollywood, California. The label was an offshoot of the shop, established in 1939 as the only shop on the West Coast that specialized in used 78s for jazz collectors. Stuart was a purist who felt that traditional New Orleans jazz was the real jazz. He preserved and promoted the traditional jazz music that had fallen out of favor in the late 1920s, and regarded the swing music that had eclipsed it with contempt.

Stuart modeled Jazz Man Records after Commodore Records, whose issues were released by a comparable record shop operating in Manhattan from 1938. He adopted its style of printing the names and instrumentation of the personnel on the label. The label also bore the address of the Jazz Man Record Shop, the exclusive sales outlet. Lester Koenig and Stuart produced the first recordings by Lu Watters' Yerba Buena Jazz Band December 19–20, 1941. A second recording session with the Watters band was produced in March 1942.

In June 1942, Stuart produced a historic recording session in New Orleans with Bunk Johnson, putting together a group he called Bunk Johnson's Original Superior Band.

In December 1942, Jazz Man Records issued four unreleased sides by Jelly Roll Morton, recorded in 1938, in partnership with Nesuhi Ertegun. Ertegun had acquired the solo piano recordings, made in Washington, D.C., while Morton was being interviewed by Alan Lomax, from a private collection in 1941.

Ertegun purchased Jazz Man Records from David Stuart in late 1946. In January 1947, Jazz Man record labels were redesigned and a dark green color, matching that of Crescent Records. Ertegun retired the Crescent label.

On January 15, 1952, Jazz Man Records sold its masters to Lester Koenig's Good Time Jazz Records for $5,500. Recordings were produced on the Jazz Man label through 1954. The last was an album by Joe Venuti and Tony Romano (Jazz Man LP LJ-336), recorded in October 1954 and released the following month.

== Select discography ==
The Jazz Man Records discography is available online from the Jazz Discography Project and is further detailed in Cary Ginell's 2010 book, Hot Jazz for Sale: Hollywood's Jazz Man Record Shop.

Number	Artist	Titles	Recording Date	Notes
Jazz Man 1	Lu Watters' Yerba Buena Jazz Band	"Maple Leaf Rag" (Scott Joplin) "Black and White Rag" (George Botsford)	December 19–20, 1941	
Jazz Man 2	Lu Watters' Yerba Buena Jazz Band	"Irish Black Bottom" (Percy Venable) "Memphis Blues" (W. C. Handy)	December 19–20, 1941	
Jazz Man 3	Lu Watters' Yerba Buena Jazz Band	"Muskrat Ramble" (Kid Ory) "Smokey Mokes" (Abe Holzmann)	December 19–20, 1941	
Jazz Man 4	Lu Watters' Yerba Buena Jazz Band	"At a Georgia Camp Meeting" (Kerry Mills) "Original Jelly Roll Blues" (Jelly Roll Morton)	December 19–20, 1941	
Jazz Man 5	Lu Watters' Yerba Buena Jazz Band	"Cake Walking Babies" (Clarence Williams) "Riverside Blues" (Richard M. Jones and Tommy Dorsey)	March 29, 1942	
Jazz Man 6	Lu Watters' Yerba Buena Jazz Band	"Come Back Sweet Papa" (Luis Russell and Paul Barbarin) "Tiger Rag" (Nick LaRocca)	March 29, 1942	
Jazz Man 7	Lu Watters' Yerba Buena Jazz Band	"Temptation Rag" (Harry Lodge) "Fidgety Feet" (Nick LaRocca and Larry Shields)	March 22, 1942; March 29, 1942	
Jazz Man 8	Bunk Johnson's Original Superior Band	"Down by the River" (Traditional) "Panama" (William H. Tyers)	June 11, 1942	
Jazz Man 9	Bunk Johnson's Original Superior Band	"Weary Blues" (Artie Matthews) "Moose March" (Traditional)	June 11, 1942	
Jazz Man 10	Bunk Johnson's Original Superior Band	"Storyville Blues" (Maceo Pinkard) "Bunk's Blues" (Bunk Johnson)	June 11, 1942	Recorded as "Those Draftin' Blues"; Recorded as "Old Time Blues"
Jazz Man Ltd. Edition 1	Bunk Johnson	Interview by Eugene Williams, parts one and two	June 12, 1942	Fifty hand-numbered copies, most autographed by Johnson
Jazz Man Ltd. Edition 2	Bunk Johnson; Bunk Johnson's Original Superior Band	Interview by Eugene Williams, part three "Yes, Lord, I'm Crippled" (Traditional)	June 12, 1942; June 11, 1942	Fifty hand-numbered copies, most autographed by Johnson
Jazz Man 11	Jelly Roll Morton	"Winin' Boy Blues" (Jelly Roll Morton) "Honky Tonk Music" (Jelly Roll Morton)	December 1938	
Jazz Man 12	Jelly Roll Morton	"Finger Buster" (Jelly Roll Morton) "Creepy Feeling" (Jelly Roll Morton)	December 1938	
Jazz Man 13	Lu Watters' Yerba Buena Jazz Band	"Daddy Do" (Fred Longshaw) "Milenberg Joys" (Jelly Roll Morton)	March 29, 1942	
Jazz Man 14	Lu Watters' Yerba Buena Jazz Band	"London Blues" (Jelly Roll Morton) "Sunset Cafe Stomp" (Percy Venable)	March 29, 1942	
Jazz Man 15	Lu Watters' Yerba Buena Jazz Band	"Terrible Blues" (Clarence Williams) "High Society" (Porter Steele)	March 29, 1942	
Jazz Man 16	Bunk Johnson's Original Superior Band	"Pallet on the Floor" (Traditional) "Ballin' the Jack" (Chris Smith and James Reese Europe)	June 11, 1942	
Jazz Man 17	Bunk Johnson's Original Superior Band; Wally Rose	"Yes, Lord, I'm Crippled" (Traditional) "Hot House Rag" (Paul Pratt)	June 11, 1942; March 22, 1942	
Jazz Man 18	Johnny Wittwer	"Aunt Hagar's Blues" (W. C. Handy) "Ragged but Right" (Traditional)	December 1945	
Jazz Man 19	Johnny Wittwer	"Ace in the Hole" (Traditional) "Two Kinds of People" (Traditional)	December 1945	
Jazz Man 20	Johnny Wittwer	"Ragtime Nightingale" (Joseph Lamb) "Bill Bailey" (Hughie Cannon)	December 1945	
Jazz Man 21	Kid Ory's Creole Jazz Band	"Creole Song" (Kid Ory) "South" (Bennie Moten and Thamon Hayes)	August 3, 1944	Reissue of Crescent Records 1 All eight Crescent discs are re-released by Jazz Man Records 1946–1947
Jazz Man 22	Kid Ory's Creole Jazz Band	"Blues for Jimmie" (Kid Ory) "Get Out of Here" (Kid Ory and Bud Scott)	August 3, 1944	Reissue of Crescent Records 2
Jazz Man 23	Kid Ory's Creole Jazz Band	"Maryland" (Traditional) "Oh Didn't He Ramble" (W. C. Handy)	September 8, 1945	Reissue of Crescent Records 3
Jazz Man 24	Kid Ory's Creole Jazz Band	"1919" (Traditional) "Down Home Rag" (Wilbur Sweatman)	September 8, 1945	Reissue of Crescent Records 4
Jazz Man 25	Kid Ory's Creole Jazz Band	"Careless Love" (Traditional) "Do What Ory Say" (Kid Ory)	August 5, 1945	Reissue of Crescent Records 5
Jazz Man 26	Kid Ory's Creole Jazz Band	"Ory's Creole Trombone" (Kid Ory) "Original Dixieland One-Step" (Nick LaRocca)	November 3, 1945	Reissue of Crescent Records 6
Jazz Man 27	Kid Ory's Creole Jazz Band	"Panama" (Will H. Tyers) "Under the Bamboo Tree" (Bob Cole)	August 5, 1945	Reissue of Crescent Records 7
Jazz Man 28	Kid Ory's Creole Jazz Band	"Weary Blues" (Artie Matthews) "Maple Leaf Rag" (Scott Joplin)	November 3, 1945	Reissue of Crescent Records 8
Jazz Man 29	Pete Daily's Rhythm Kings	"Sobbin' Blues" (Art Kassel and Vic Berton); Jazz Man Strut (Rosy McHargue)	December 24, 1947	
Jazz Man 30	Pete Daily's Rhythm Kings	"Yelping Hound Blues" (Anton Lada and Alcide Nunez) "Clarinet Marmalade" (Larry Shields and Henry Ragas)	December 24, 1947	
Jazz Man 31	Turk Murphy's Bay City Stompers	"Shake That Thing" (Charlie Jackson) "Kansas City Man Blues" (Clarence Williams and Clarence Johnson)	December 31, 1947	
Jazz Man 32	Turk Murphy's Bay City Stompers	"Yellow Dog Blues" (W. C. Handy) "Brother Lowdown" (Turk Murphy)	December 31, 1947	
Jazz Man 33	Darnell Howard's Frisco Footwarmers	"Some of These Days" (Shelton Brooks) "Dippermouth Blues" (King Oliver and Louis Armstrong)	April 29, 1950	
Jazz Man 34	Darnell Howard's Frisco Footwarmers	"Pretty Baby" (Tony Jackson) "St. Louis Blues" (W. C. Handy)	April 29, 1950	Last session before its masters are sold to Good Time Jazz Records

== See also ==
- Crescent Records
