= Zutty Singleton =

American jazz drummer (1898– 1975)

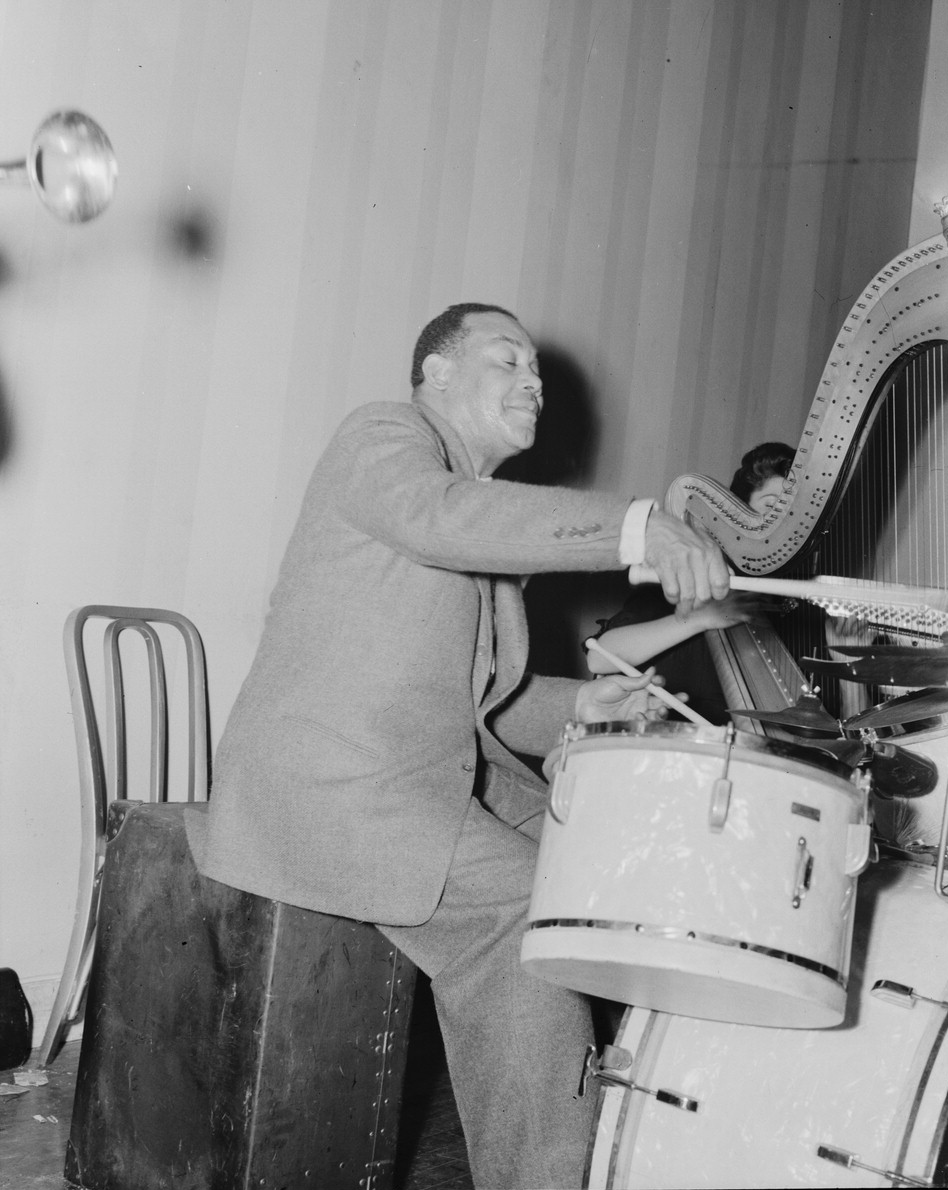
- Singleton with Adele Girard on harp in 1939; photo: William P. Gottlieb

Background information
- Born: Arthur James Singleton; May 14, 1898; Bunkie, Louisiana, U.S.
- Died: July 14, 1975 (aged 77) New York City, U.S.
- Genres: Jazz
- Occupation: Musician
- Instrument: Drums
- Years active: 1915–1970

Arthur James "Zutty" Singleton (May 14, 1898 – July 14, 1975) was an American jazz drummer.

== Career ==
Singleton was born in Bunkie, Louisiana, United States, and raised in New Orleans. According to his Jazz Profiles biography, his unusual nickname, acquired in infancy, is the Creole word for "cute". He was working professionally with Steve Lewis by 1915. He served with the United States Navy in World War I. After returning to New Orleans he worked with Papa Celestin, Big Eye Louis Nelson, John Robichaux, and Fate Marable. He left for St. Louis, Missouri, to play in Charlie Creath's band, then moved to Chicago, Illinois.

In Chicago, Singleton played with Doc Cook, Dave Peyton, Jimmie Noone, and theater bands, then joined Louis Armstrong's band with Earl Hines. In 1928 and 1929, Singleton performed on landmark recordings with Louis Armstrong and his Hot Five. In 1929, he moved with Armstrong to New York City.

In addition to playing with Armstrong in New York, he played with Bubber Miley, Tommy Ladnier, Fats Waller, Jelly Roll Morton and Otto Hardwick. Singleton also played in the band backing Bill Robinson. In 1934, Singleton returned to Chicago. In 1937, he returned to New York, working there with Mezz Mezzrow and Sidney Bechet.

In 1943, Singleton moved to Los Angeles, California, where he led his own band, played for motion pictures, and appeared on the radio program The Orson Welles Almanac (1944). He also worked with Slim Gaillard, Wingy Manone, Eddie Condon, Nappy Lamare, Art Hodes, Oran "Hot Lips" Page, and Max Kaminsky.

== Death ==
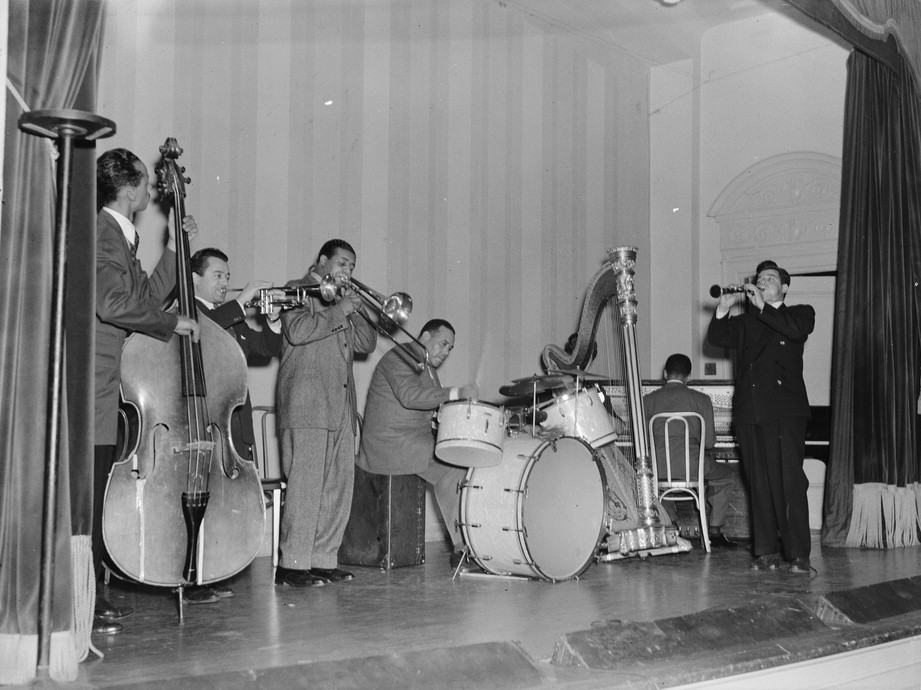
Tommy Potter, Max Kaminsky, Benny Morton, Singleton, Adele Girard, Teddy Wilson, and Joe Marsala, National Press Club, Washington, D.C. in 1939

Singleton retired after suffering a stroke in 1970. He died in New York City in 1975, at the age of 77. His wife Margie (sister of Charlie Creath) died in 1982 at the age of 82.
