= Minor Hall =

American jazz musician

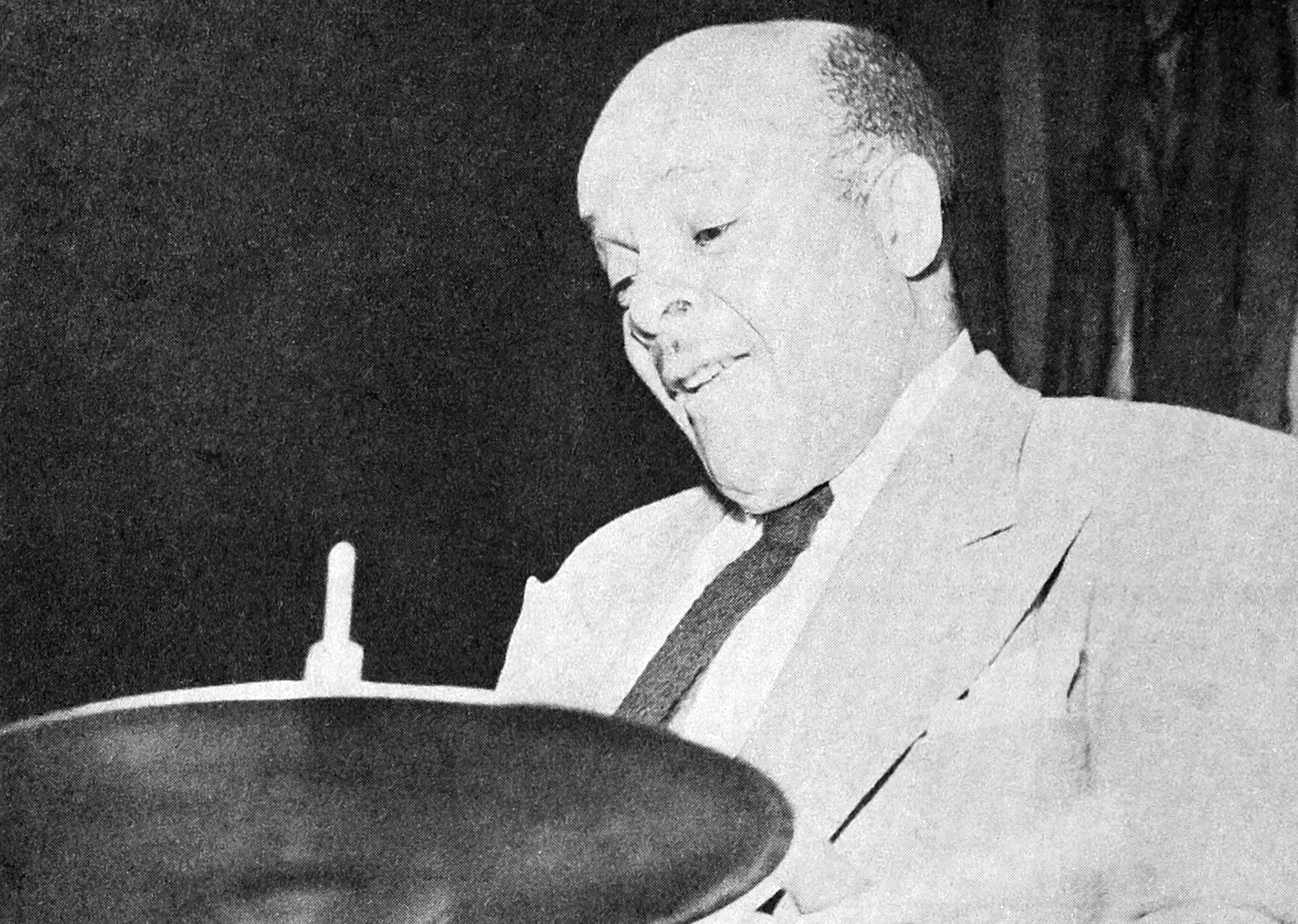
Minor Hall in 1948

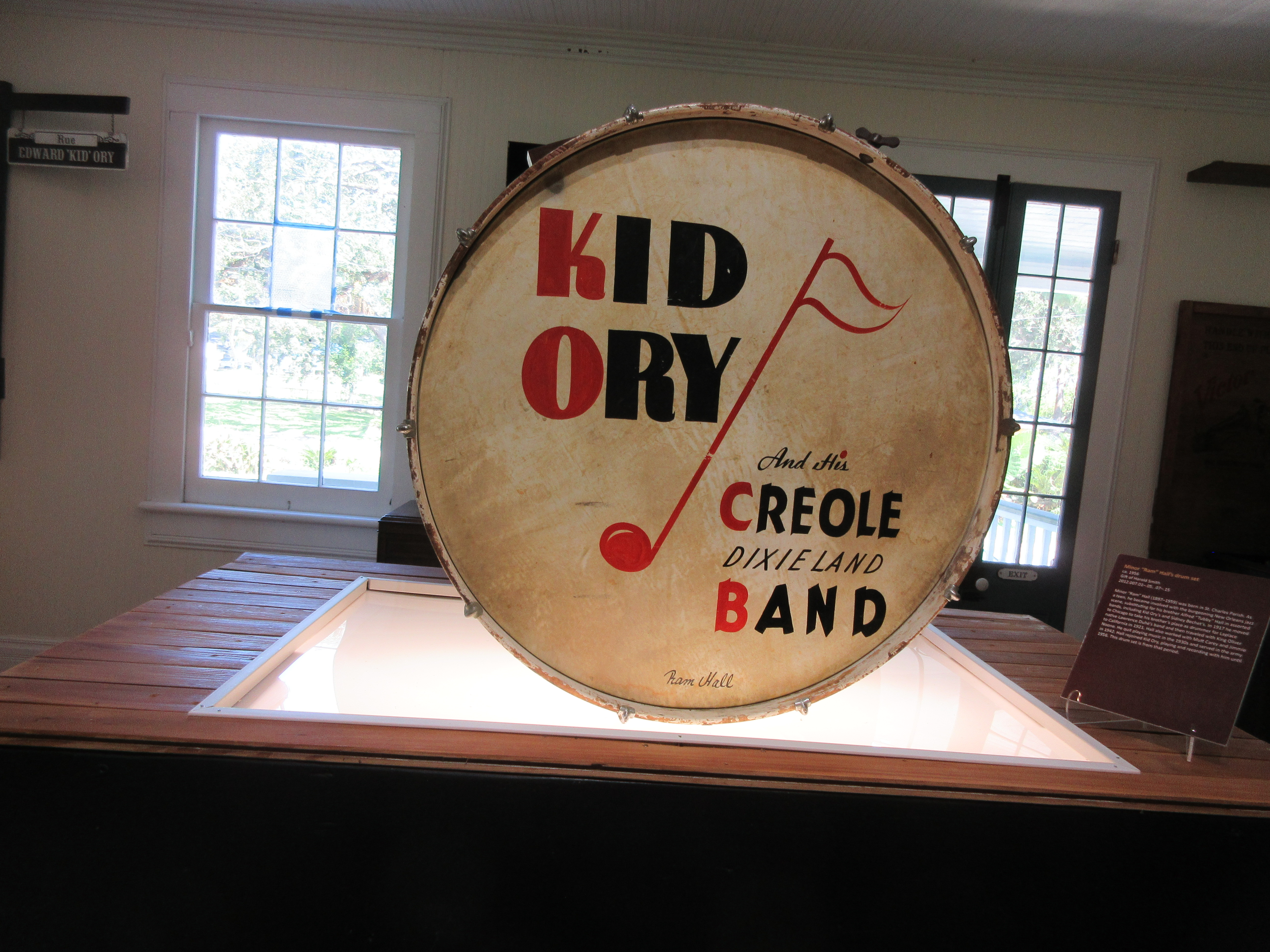
Bass drum used by Ram Hall with Kid Ory's Creole Jazz Band, on display at 1811 Kid Ory Historic House.

Minor Hall (March 2, 1897 – October 16, 1959), better known as Ram Hall, was an American jazz drummer active on the New Orleans jazz scene. He was the younger brother of Tubby Hall.

Minor Hall was born in Sellers, Louisiana. He studied at New Orleans University until 1914, then began playing with Kid Ory in the middle of the decade. He played in various New Orleans ensembles, including the Superior Band, then moved to Chicago in 1918. He took his brother's spot in Lawrence Duhe's band briefly before serving in the U.S. Army during World War I. By the time he returned, King Oliver was leading Duhe's band, which Hall rejoined in 1921. In 1926 he played with Jimmie Noone, and then moved to California for an extended run with Mutt Carey's Jeffersonians (1927–32).

He played in the Winslow Allen Band in the 1930s, but took a hiatus from music for part of the decade, and served briefly in the Army again in 1942. In 1945 he rejoined Ory in his Creole Jazz Band and became one of his most longstanding members, remaining with Ory's ensemble until 1956, when he retired on account of poor health. Hall never led his own recording date, though he recorded extensively with Ory and also did some recording with Louis Armstrong in the 1940s. He died in Sawtelle, California, aged 61.
