= Ory's Creole Trombone =

Song

"Ory's Creole Trombone"
A 1921 recording of "Ory's Creole Trombone" performed by Kid Ory's Sunshine Orchestra

"Ory's Creole Trombone" is a jazz composition by Kid Ory. Ory first recorded it in Los Angeles in 1921 (or 1922, according to other sources). The band included Ory on trombone, Mutt Carey on cornet, Dink Johnson on clarinet, Fred Washington on piano, Ed Garland on bass and Ben Borders on drums. The recording of "Ory's Creole Trombone" was released by John and Reb Spikes' short-lived Sunshine Records label. It was the first issued recording session by an African American jazz band from New Orleans. (Contrary to sometimes repeated misinformation that it marked the first jazz recording made by a black orchestra that honor goes to Wilbur Sweatman. ) Other numbers recorded the same day included "When You're Alone Blues", "Krooked Blues", "Society Blues", "That Sweet Something Dear", "Maybe Some Day" and "Froggie Moore".

Ory's band was called Kid Ory's Creole Orchestra, but they used the name "Spike's Seven Pods of Pepper Orchestra" for the Sunshine recordings. The label also released the same records credited to the Sunshine Band. According to Reb Spikes, recording studio owner Arne Nordskog first put his own Nordskog labels on the produced records; Spikes then had to paste the Sunshine label over Nordskog's. The original records have become collector's items. In many cases the Sunshine label has eroded and parts of the Nordskog label can be seen beneath it.

Some of the masters from the recording sessions were lost due to heat when they were transported from the West Coast to a pressing plant in New Jersey. The melting wax rendered four of the six recordings completely unusable and left an audible click on the pressings of "Ory's Creole Trombone".

Ory recorded the piece several times. In 1927 he made a recording as part of Louis Armstrong and his Hot Five. In 1945 he recorded it in Los Angeles with Kid Ory's Creole Orchestra.

"Ory's Creole Trombone" has clear ragtime elements and is closer to the old New Orleans style than the music of many New Orleans musicians who recorded in Chicago, such as King Oliver. The composition is divided into 16-bar sections. Sections A and B follow the original melody closely with improvised variations. Section C functions as a chorus; this part is played in Ory's original recording as collective improvisation, while in Louis Armstrong's later recording the C section works as solo improvisation by Armstrong and clarinetist Jimmie Noone.
