= Abene =

Abene is a surname. Notable people with the surname include:

- Mark Abene (born 1972), American computer security expert and entrepreneur
- Mike Abene (born 1942), American jazz pianist

== See also ==
- Aben (disambiguation)
- Abéné, village in Senegal
