= Charles Deslondes =

Slave leader in the 1811 German Coast Uprising

Charles Deslondes (c. 1789 – January 11, 1811) was an African American rebel who was one of the leaders in the 1811 German Coast uprising, a slave revolt that began on January 8, 1811, in the Territory of Orleans. He led more than 500 rebels against the plantations along the Mississippi River toward New Orleans. White planters formed militias and ended up hunting down the rebels.

The enslaved insurgents killed one free person of color, the "commandant", "overseer", or "slave driver" on the Andry Plantation, kicking off the revolt, and one white man during their retreat from the outskirts of New Orleans. The responding militia and the army killed 95 enslaved people, reflecting killings in the battle on Bernard Bernoudy's plantation, some gratuitous "accidental" killings of uninvolved enslaved people by the Army on its march from New Orleans, and the executions which followed the tribunals after the revolt was put down.

== Early life ==
Charles Deslondes was born on the plantation of the Deslondes family in Haiti about the year 1789. Deslondes's plantation succession records have Charles described as being a "Creole mulatto slave" by the name of Charles, "about 16 years old", listed as a "field laborer." He was likely baptized a Catholic.

Due to the outbreak of the Haitian Revolution in 1791, the Deslondes family had all of their possessions, including Charles Deslondes and other slaves, sent from Saint-Domingue, modern-day Haiti, to Louisiana by the time Jacques Deslondes died in 1793.

Charles Deslondes worked as a "driver," or overseer of enslaved people, on the plantation of Col. Manuel Andre (or Andry), who enslaved 86 people. This plantation was later renamed the Woodland Plantation.

== The revolt ==
Deslondes had organized slaves and maroons for revolt in what is now St. John the Baptist Parish, part of the German Coast (of the Mississippi River) because it had been settled by many German immigrants in the 1720s, long before the cultivation of sugar cane in the area. Deslondes's forces recruited other enslaved people from plantations along the way southeast into St. Charles Parish before turning back shortly before encountering militia sent from New Orleans. Accounts of the number of insurgents vary, from 200 to 500 men. The men killed two whites near the beginning of their march and burned down three plantation houses and some crops. They fought primarily with cane knives and captured a limited number of weapons, although they had planned on more.

On January 11, a planter militia led by Col. Manuel Andry attacked the main body of insurgents at the back of Bernard Bernoudy's plantation west of New Orleans. Andry and his overseer, a free man of color named "Petit" Baptiste Thomassin, had been the first targets of the insurrection. Mr. Thomassin discovered the rebels who killed him, attacked Manuel Andry, and seriously wounded him with an ax. Some contemporary articles falsely indicate that "younger Andry" (son of Manuel Andry) had also been killed. The "younger Andry", Gilbert Andry, died on January 2 and was buried on January 3, five days before the start of the revolt. Gilbert was married to the daughter of Jacques Deslondes, Marie Marcelline Deslondes. The militia killed about forty enslaved people in the battle, from which many enslaved people fled into the swamps. Shortly afterward, the militia killed fourteen more enslaved people in other skirmishes and captured many more, although as many as 100 may have escaped permanently. After interrogating the captives, they quickly tried and executed eighteen enslaved people at the Destrehan plantation. They tried and executed eleven enslaved people in New Orleans. A total of ninety-five insurgents were killed in the aftermath of the rebellion.

=== Death ===
Deslondes was among the first captured by dogs after the battle. The militia did not hold him for trial or interrogation. Samuel Hambleton described Deslonde's fate: "Charles [Deslondes] had his hands chopped off then shot in one thigh & then the other, until they were both broken – then shot in the body and before he had expired was put into a bundle of straw and roasted!" His dying cries sent a message to the other escaped enslaved people in the marshes.

== Legacy ==
In 2021 on the site, the 1811 Kid Ory Historic House opened, dedicated both to the German Coast uprising and to Kid Ory, American jazz composer, trombonist, and bandleader, who was born there in 1886.) In a letter printed in the Philadelphia "Political and Commercial Advertiser" on February 19 that year, Deslondes was mistakenly described as a free person of color.
