= Tubby Hall =

American jazz drummer (1895–1945)

- Born: October 12, 1895; Sellers, Louisiana, U.S.
- Died: May 13, 1945 (aged 49); Chicago, Illinois, U.S.
- Occupation: Jazz drummer
- Relatives: Minor "Ram" Hall (brother)

Alfred "Tubby" Hall (October 12, 1895 – May 13, 1945) was an American jazz drummer.

== Biography ==
Hall was born in Sellers, Louisiana, United States; his family moved to New Orleans in his childhood. His younger brother, Minor "Ram" Hall, also became a professional drummer. Hall played in many marching bands in New Orleans, including with Buddie Petit.

In March 1917, Tubby Hall moved to Chicago, Illinois, where he played with Sugar Johnny Smith. After two years in the United States Army, he returned to playing in Chicago, mostly with New Orleans bands, joining Carroll Dickerson's Orchestra (recording with it in 1927) and later with the groups of King Oliver, Jimmie Noone, Tiny Parham, Johnny Dodds. Noted swing and big-band drummer Gene Krupa said that Hall and Zutty Singleton "were great! They knew every trick and just how to phrase the parts of the choruses behind the horns, how to lead a man in, what to do at the turn-arounds, when to use sticks and when to use brushes, when to go for the rims or the woodblocks, what cymbals are for."

Hall is seen in Armstrong's movies of the early 1930s, including the live action and Betty Boop cartoon I'll Be Glad When You're Dead, You Rascal You (1932) and A Rhapsody in Black and Blue (1932), made by Paramount. Only Armstrong and Hall got closeups in the two films, and both got their faces transposed with those of racially stereotyped "jungle natives" in the cartoon. Hall morphs from a jazz drummer to a cannibal stirring a cooking pot with two wooden sticks.

His drumming style was forceful and sober, generally maintaining a constant tempo on the snare. Jazz critic Hugues Panassié considered him one of the three greatest jazz drummers of his generation, along with Zutty Singleton and Warren "Baby" Dodds.

Tubby Hall died in Chicago, aged 49.
