= Frog Records =

Frog Records
- Founded: 1994
- Founder: David French
- Genre: Blues, jazz, jug band
- Country of origin: UK
- Official website: frog-records.co.uk

Frog Records is a British independent record label that specializes in remastering and reissuing jazz, blues, and jug band music. Since 2004 the company has been owned by record producer Paul Swinton. Under Swinton the catalog has expanded steadily, maintaining the emphasis on complete or near-complete chronological sets, rare material, and detailed documentation. He also publishes the Frog Blues and Jazz Annual, a high-quality illustrated yearbook of research articles, discographies, and rare photographs.

The Frog catalog includes the complete recordings of Bessie Smith, King Oliver, Johnny Dodds, Dixieland Jug Blowers, Thomas Morris, Memphis Jug Band, New Orleans Owls, and The Washingtonians (Duke Ellington's earliest recordings). Thematic “Frog Spawn” batches and specialist volumes further document lesser-known blues and jug performers.

The label was formed in 1994 by jazz collector David French, who died in 2004, and friends who sought recordings from around the world to reissue, though mostly in the U.S. Many CDs have been remastered by audio engineers led by John R. T. Davies, Charlie Crump, and Nick Dellow.
