= Aben =

Aben may refer to:

- Aben Humeya (1520–1569), Spanish leader who commanded the Morisco Revolt against Philip II of Spain
- Aben Kandel (1897–1993), American screenwriter, novelist, and boxer
- Karl Aben (1896–1976), Estonian-Latvian linguist and translator
- Aben, Louisiana, an unincorporated community in Ascension Parish, Louisiana

== See also ==
- Abens, a river in Bavaria, Germany
- Abbán, an Irish saint
