= Roy Palmer (musician) =

American jazz musician

- Born: April 2, 1887; New Orleans, Louisiana, U.S.
- Died: December 22, 1963 (aged 76); Chicago, Illinois, U.S.
- Genres: Jazz
- Instruments: Trombone

Roy Palmer (April 2, 1887 – December 22, 1963) was an American jazz trombonist.

== Career ==
Palmer began his career in 1906 in New Orleans as a guitarist with the Rozelle Orchestra. He played trumpet and then trombone with Richard M. Jones, Freddie Keppard, Willie Hightower, Tuxedo Brass Band, and Onward Brass Band. In 1917 he left New Orleans and moved to Chicago, where he worked with King Oliver, Lawrence Duhe, and Doc Cook.

Palmer recorded with Johnny Dodds, Jelly Roll Morton, Ida Cox, the Alabama Rascals, and the State Street Ramblers. In the 1930s, he was a factory worker and music teacher.
