= William Manuel Johnson =

American jazz banjo and double bass player (died 1972)

Bill Johnson
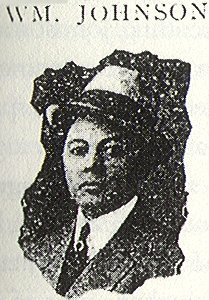
- Johnson in 1909

Background information
- Birth name: William Manuel Johnson
- Born: Disputed; Talladega, Alabama
- Died: December 3, 1972; New Braunfels, Texas, U.S.
- Genres: Jazz, dixieland
- Occupation: Musician
- Instrument: Double bass
- Years active: 1880s–1950s
- Formerly of: The Original Creole Orchestra, King Oliver's Creole Jazz Band, Bill Johnson's Louisiana Jug Band

William Manuel "Bill" Johnson (died December 3, 1972) was an American jazz musician who played banjo and double bass; he is considered the father of the "slap" style of double bass playing.

In New Orleans, he played at Lulu White's legendary house of prostitution, with the Eagle Band, and with the Excelsior Brass Band. Johnson claimed to have started "slapping" the strings of his bass (a more vigorous technique than the classical pizzicato) after he accidentally broke his bow on the road with his band in northern Louisiana in the early 1910s. Other New Orleans string bass players picked up this style, and spread it across the country with the spread of New Orleans Jazz.

Johnson was founder and manager of the first jazz band to leave New Orleans and tour widely in the 1910s, The Original Creole Orchestra. They participated in vaudeville skits centered around the "Uncle" character and the "boys," performing in the Midwest, Northwest, and Canada. He brought the Creole Band to Chicago in 1915. Johnson and his band played an instrumental role in establishing Royal Gardens (later known as Lincoln Gardens), as one of the great jazz clubs in Chicago; a location they were residence at beginning in 1918.

In Chicago during the early 1920s he assembled King Oliver's Creole Jazz Band, considered perhaps the best of the early ensemble style jazz bands. He taught younger Chicago musicians (including Milt Hinton) his "slap" style of string bass playing. He made many recordings in Chicago in the late 1920s. He notably says "Oh play that thing" into the horn during the recording of "Dippermouth Blues" in 1923 with King Oliver's Creole Jazz Band.

Johnson continued to play with various jazz bands and orchestras into the early 1950s, sometimes working under other names. He was also involved in the import/export business along the Mexico–United States border.

Johnson's younger half-brother Ollie "Dink" Johnson was also a noted musician. Jelly Roll Morton's common law wife from 1917 to 1922, Anita Gonzales (Bessie Johnson), was Bill Johnson's half-sister.

Bill Johnson died in New Braunfels, Texas in 1972.
