= Snag it =

"Snag It"
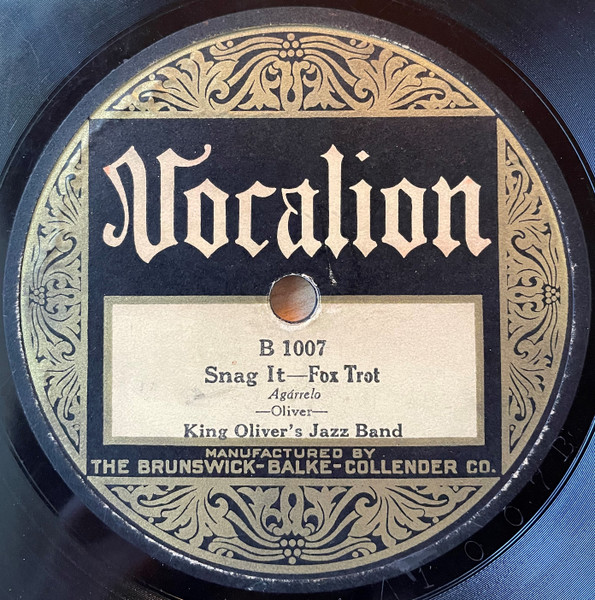
- Original Vocalion/Brunswick disc label

Single by Joe "King" Oliver

from the album The Legendary King Oliver
- Recorded: March 11, 1926
- Venue: Chicago, Illinois, U.S.
- Genre: Jazz
- Length: 3:12
- Label: Vocalion matrix E2634-E2635
- Songwriter: Joe "King" Oliver
- Producer: Joe "King" Oliver

"Snag It" is an instrumental piece written by Joe "King" Oliver and recorded by Oliver at least twice. The first fime with his Jazz Band in Chicago for Vocalion/Brunswick was on March 11, 1926, then on September 17, 1926. Many others recorded the piece: Fletcher Henderson's Dixie Stompers in 1927, Louis Armstrong in 1957, Andy Kirk in 1930, Bunk Johnson, Terry Lightfoot, Humphrey Lyttelton and many other bands playing traditional jazz.

"Snag It" is of a twelve bar blues format, typical of the jazz style that predominated during Oliver's early career. "Snag It" continues to be performed today, partly due to its historical significance. Oliver was Armstrong's teacher and mentor, the latter commenting that Oliver was a pioneer in the evolution of jazz... and one of those who shaped the Creole sound of New Orleans jazz.

"Snag It" appeared on Armstrong's Satchmo: A Musical Autobiography.
