= Dink Johnson =

American Dixieland jazz musician (1892–1954)

Ollie "Dink" Johnson (1892 – November 29, 1954) was an American Dixieland jazz pianist, clarinetist, and drummer.

== Background ==
Johnson was born in 1892, most likely in New Orleans, although the date is disputed and some sources have cited the place of birth as Biloxi, Mississippi. His mother, Hattie, was unmarried and his father's name is unknown. His elder half-brother was double bassist William Manuel "Bill" Johnson. He worked around Mississippi and New Orleans before moving to the western United States in the early 1910s. He played around Nevada and California, often with his brother Bill. He played with the Original Creole Orchestra, mostly on drums.

Johnson made his first recordings in 1922 on clarinet with Kid Ory's Band. He made more recordings in the 1940s and 1950s, mostly on piano, although also doing some one-man band recordings, playing all three of his instruments through over dubbing. Johnson's piano style was influenced by Jelly Roll Morton (the common-law husband of Johnson's half-sister, Bessie, known as Anita Gonzales). Dink's clarinet playing was influenced by Larry Shields. Johnson wrote tunes, including "The Krooked Blues" (recorded by King Oliver) and "So Different Blues".

Johnson died in Portland, Oregon in 1954, aged 62.
