= Lincoln Gardens =

Coordinates: 41°50′18″N 87°36′53″W

Lincoln Gardens, also known during its history as Royal Gardens, Royal Gardens Café, the New Charleston Café and Café de Paris, was a night club and dance hall that played an instrumental role in the history of jazz and youth culture in the city of Chicago during the first three decades of the 20th century. Opening sometime in the first few years of the 20th century, it was the largest dance hall in South Side, Chicago prior to the opening of the Savoy Ballroom in 1927. Originally a venue that employed only white musicians and catered to only white patrons, it was reinvented as a space for patrons and musicians of all races by African-American entrepreneurs Virgil Williams and William Bottoms in 1918. This reinvented venue was at first the home of Bill Johnson and the Original Creole Band. Later King Oliver's Creole Jazz Band was the resident band at the venue from 1922 through 1924. It closed in June 1927 after the establishment was bombed.

== History ==
Lincoln Gardens was a very large dance hall and nightclub located at 459 East 31st St Chicago, IL 60616. An important venue in youth culture in Chicago during the early 20th century, it was the largest dance hall in South Side, Chicago prior to the construction of the Savoy Ballroom in 1927. It could accommodate approximately 1000 dancers on its floor.

Lincoln Gardens was not the first establishment to occupy this dance hall. Opening some time in the first years of the 20th century, the facility was originally a segregated dance hall by practice if not by law, that featured bands with only white musicians and patrons. This business closed sometime before 1918 after two police officers were murdered on the premises. The Chicago City Council had banned any further club or cabaret from opening at the location following this event.

The effort to open a new jazz club at that location was spearheaded by Virgil Williams who was the housemate of William Bottoms, the operator of the Chicago jazz club Dreamland Café. Both African-American, the two men also operated the music publication Whip which promoted clubs and musicians in the city of Chicago. Williams successfully lobbied Chicago politician Louis B. Anderson to support the club by making him a 1/3 partner in the business venture, and Anderson in turn used his influence as part of Chicago mayor William Hale Thompson's political machine to get the political will to support the club and prevent police harassment of the establishment and its patrons. Bottoms was the third partner in this venture, and the newly formed club was titled the Royal Gardens Café, which was shortened to Royal Gardens in press.

Royal Gardens opened in 1918 as a venue open to musicians and patrons of all races. Bill Johnson and the Original Creole Band were the ensemble in residence at the newly opened establishment. Johnson quickly established the club's high reputation for quality jazz performances, and helped recruit a series of guest appearances by some of the best New Orleans Jazz musicians that had a profound impact on the development of jazz in Chicago.

In 1921 the Royal Gardens Cafe was sold to Mrs. Florence Majors, and sometime between February and July 1921 its name was changed to Lincoln Gardens. Under her tenure King Oliver took over as the resident band leader at the hall from 17 June 1922 until February 1924; leading King Oliver's Creole Jazz Band. After Oliver departed for a four-month tour elsewhere, several of his band members stayed behind to continue leading the musicians at the establishment; including Johnny Dodds, Baby Dodds, and Honore Dutrey. They were joined by trumpeter Bob Shoffner until Oliver's return in June 1924. After a fire significantly damaged the hall in late 1924, it was beautifully refurbished and reopened on 28 October 1925 as the New Charleston Café. The hall's name was later changed to the Café de Paris sometime before it closed in June 1927 when it was the target of a bombing suspected to be related to gang warfare. After this the venue remained closed.

== See also ==
- Black and tan clubs
