= Savoy Ballroom (Chicago) =

Coordinates: 41.8092°N 87.6159°W

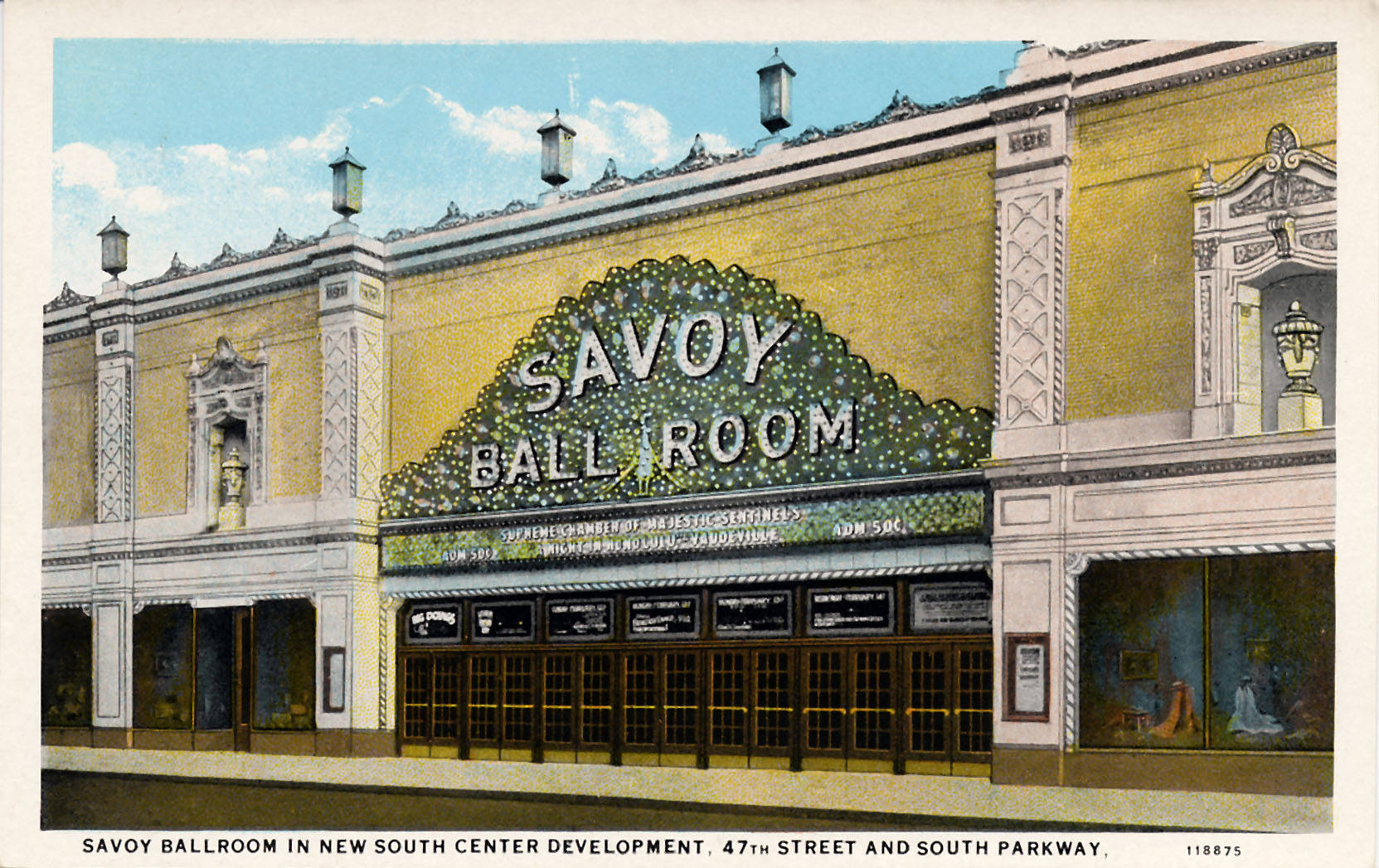
- A 1928 postcard of the ballroom
- Interactive map of the Savoy Ballroom (Chicago) area

General information
- Location: Chicago
- Opened: 1927
- Demolished: 1970s

The Savoy Ballroom was a nightclub in Chicago, United States. Located at 4733 South Parkway, it opened on Thanksgiving Eve, November 23, 1927, and closed in 1948.

== History ==
At the time of its opening in 1927, the Savoy Ballroom was the largest dancehall in South Side, Chicago; surpassing the other large hall in that part of the city, Lincoln Gardens. The Savoy was heavily funded and its size was unprecedented on the South Side of Chicago with elaborate decor, a triple subfloor, and a checkroom that could accommodate 6,000 hats and coats. Originally featuring primarily Jazz artists, including Louis Armstrong, Count Basie, Duke Ellington, Earl Hines, Stan Kenton, Dizzy Gillespie, Billie Holiday, Ella Fitzgerald, Gene Krupa, Woody Herman, the Savoy also hosted other activities, such as boxing, figure skating, and basketball exhibitions featuring the Savoy Big Five, who would later change their name to the Harlem Globetrotters.

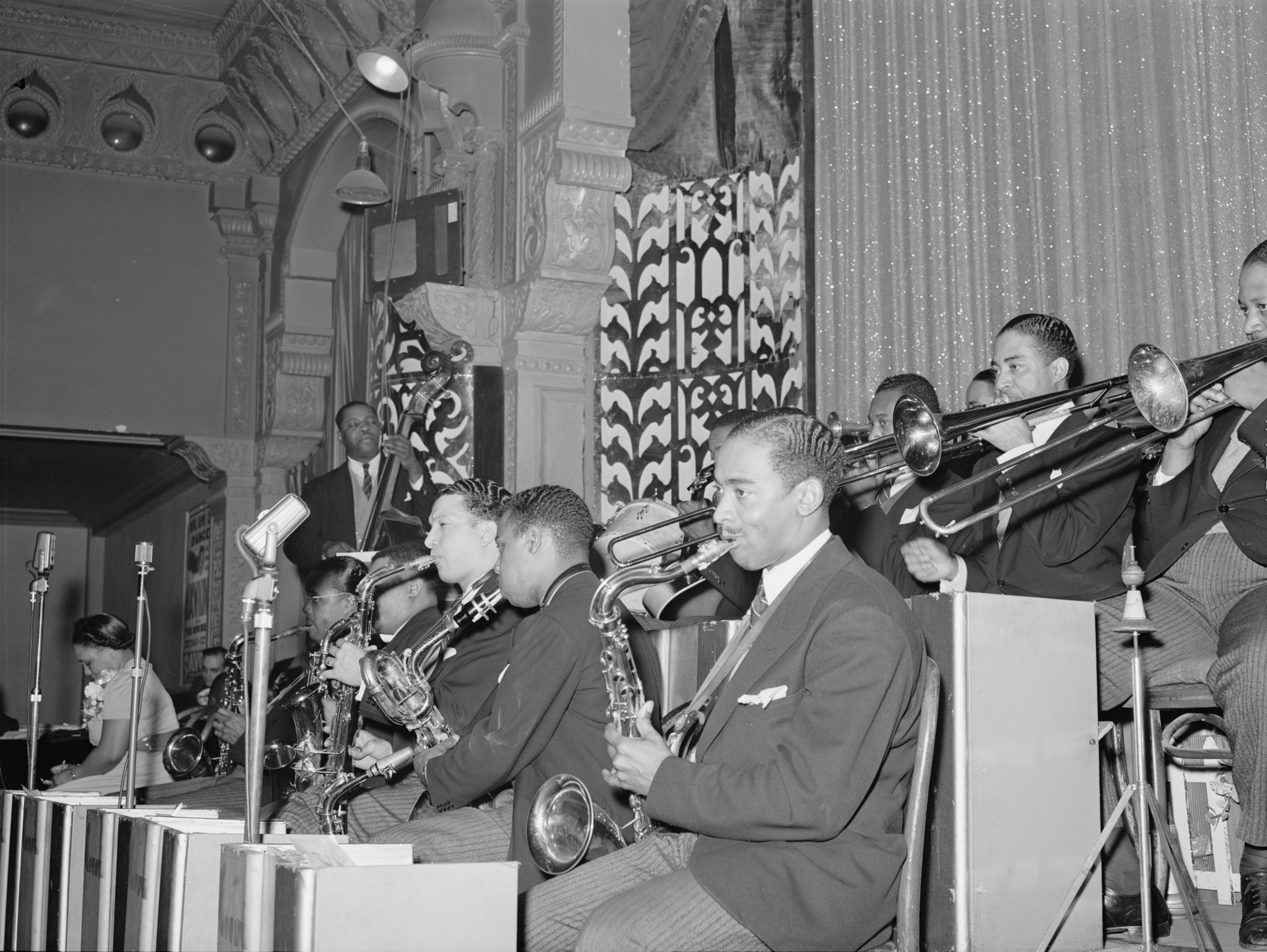
The interior of the ballroom in 1941, with the band playing

From 1927 until 1940, there was continuous music supplied by two bands per night. When one band took a break, the other would go on. During these years, the Savoy was open seven days a week. Although most of the Savoy's patrons were black, growing numbers of white Chicagoans visited the Savoy.

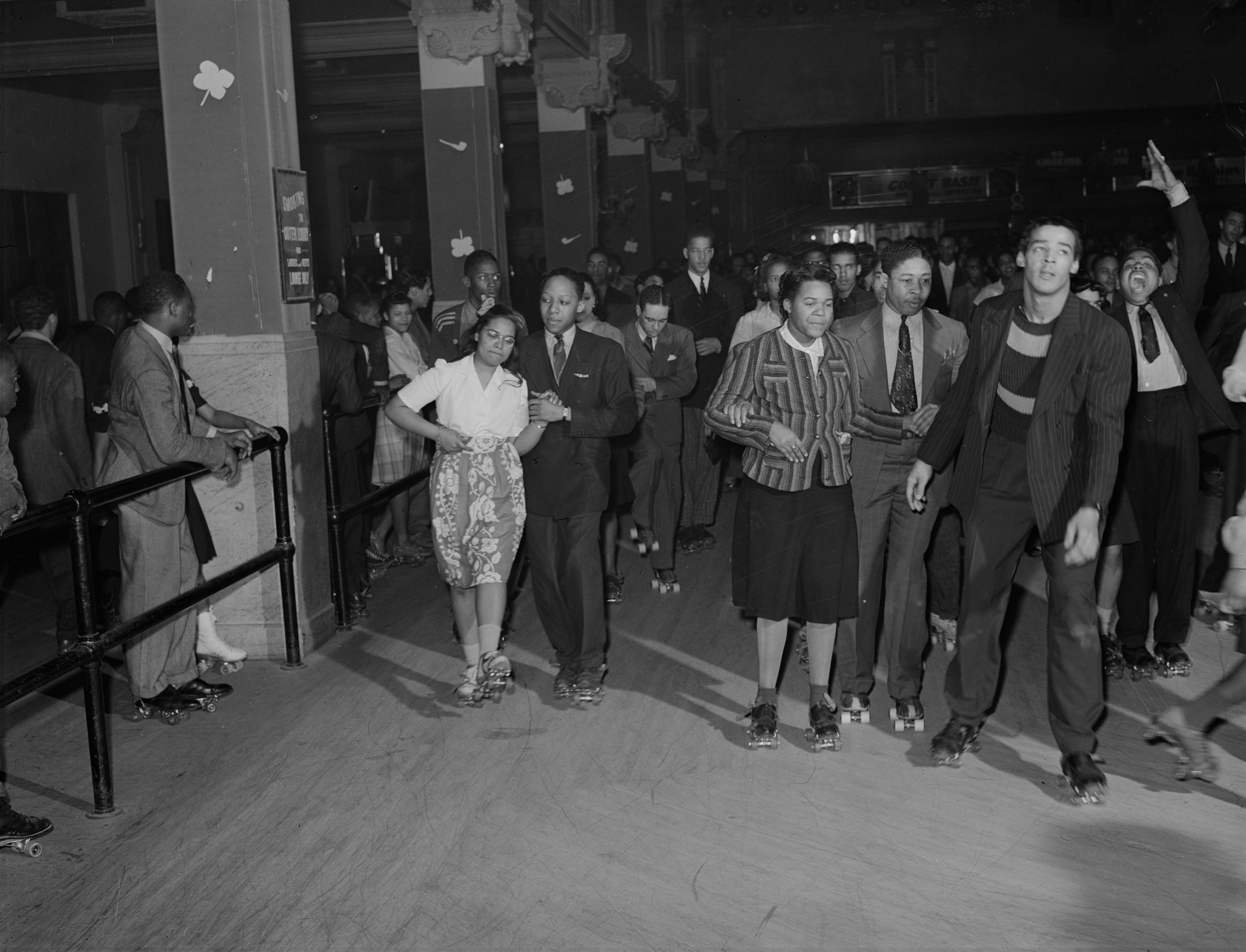
People rollerskating in the ballroom on a Saturday night, 1941

The Savoy closed in 1948, and was demolished in the early 1970s. The site is now home to the Lou Rawls Theater Cultural Center.
