= Karl Aben =

Estonian linguist and translator

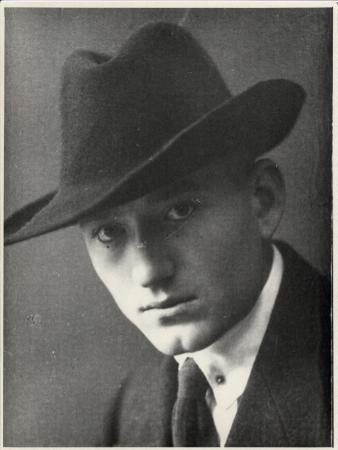
- Born: Kārlis Abens; 23 September 1896
- Died: 22 October 1976 (aged 80); Tartu, Estonia
- Occupation: Linguist
- Known for: Estonian-Latvian translation

Karl Aben (Latvian: Kārlis Abens; 23 September 1896 – 22 October 1976) was an Estonian and Latvian linguist and translator. In Estonia, he became known as the country's foremost translator from Latvian at the time (such as translated works of Jānis Rainis, Vilis Lācis and Andrejs Upīts, among many others), but he also translated from Estonian into Latvian (such as Oskar Luts' Abandoned House).

== Biography ==
Aben was born into an Estonian-speaking family in Northern Latvia on 23 September 1896 and learned Latvian as a child. In 1918, he graduated from Valmiera Teacher's Seminary. Aben later went on to study at the University of Tartu, graduating with a degree in philology in 1940.

From 1940 to 1941, he worked at the University of Riga as a lecturer of Estonian and Finnish. From 1944 to 1961, he worked at the University of Tartu. During his career, Aben translated many works of Latvian literature into Estonian.

Aben published numerous articles on Estonian and Latvian literature and relations, as well as pedagogy and linguistics. He also compiled the first Estonian-Latvian and Latvian-Estonian dictionaries, publishing them in 1967.
