= LaPlace, Louisiana =

- Census-designated place
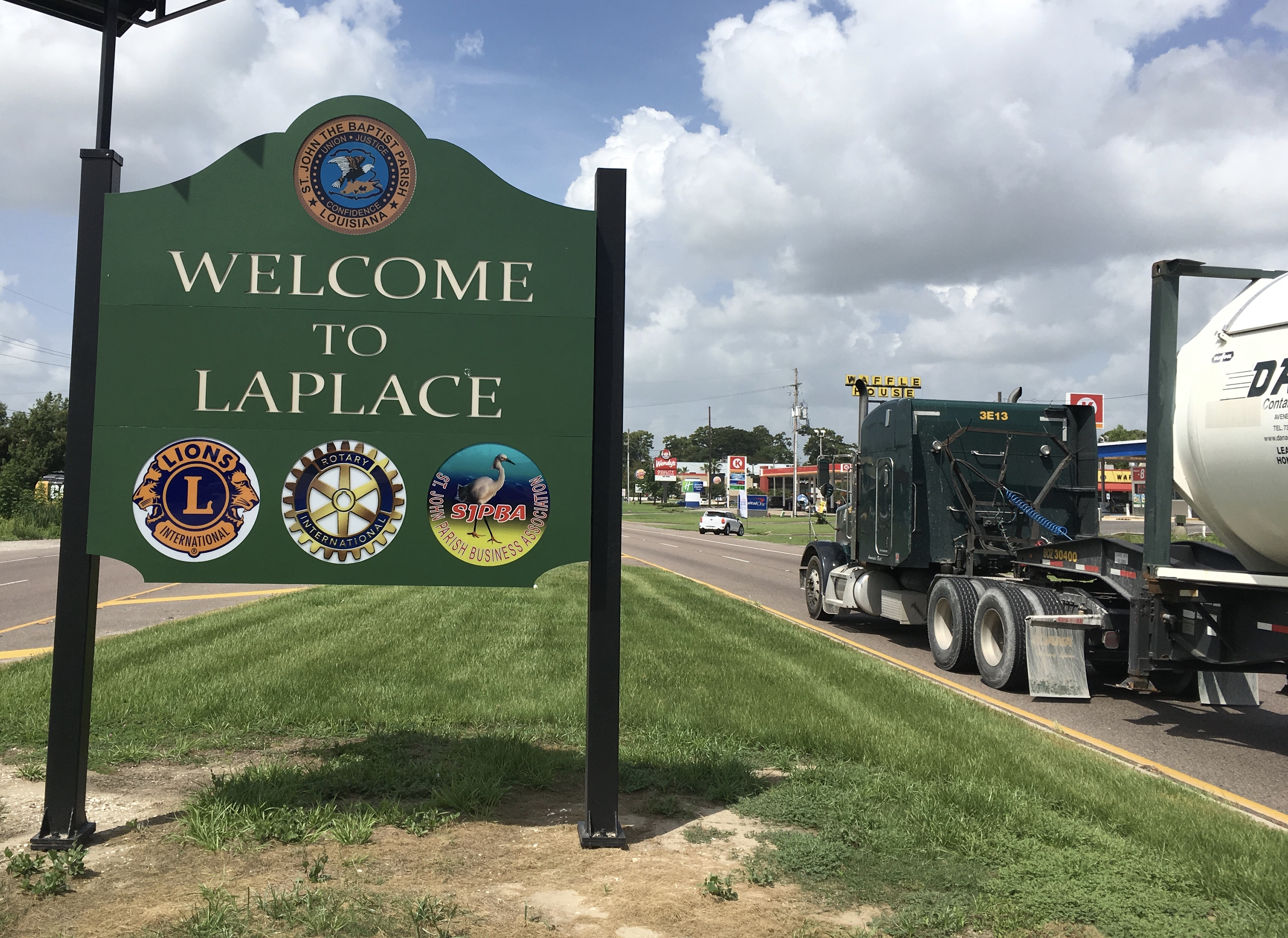
- U.S. Highway 61 (Airline Highway) at U.S. Highway 51 intersection in LaPlace

- Location of La Place in Louisiana
- Coordinates: 30°3′59″N 90°28′49″W
- Country: United States
- State: Louisiana
- Parish: St. John the Baptist

Area
  - Total: 22.05 sq mi (57.11 km^{2})
  - Land: 20.90 sq mi (54.12 km^{2})
  - Water: 1.15 sq mi (2.99 km^{2})
- Elevation: 10 ft (3.0 m)

Population (2020)
  - Total: 28,841
  - Density: 1,380.3/sq mi (532.92/km^{2})
- Time zone: UTC-6 (CST)
  - Summer (DST): UTC-5 (CDT)
- ZIP code: 70068
- Area code: 985
- FIPS code: 22-42030
- Website: Official website

LaPlace (/ləˈplɑːs/ lə-PLAHSS) is a census-designated place (CDP) in St. John the Baptist Parish, Louisiana, United States, situated along the east bank of the Mississippi River, in the New Orleans metropolitan area. In 2020, it had a population of 28,841.

LaPlace is the southern terminus of Interstate 55, where it joins with Interstate 10, and of US 51, where it terminates at the junction with US 61. LaPlace is located 25 miles (40 km) west of New Orleans.

== History ==
=== Pre-European ===
The Chitimacha lived in the region prior to the arrival of European colonists. The tribe's lands once encompassed the entire Atchafalaya Basin, westward to Lafayette, southward to the Gulf of Mexico and eastward to the New Orleans area. The Chitimacha tribe currently resides on a reservation in St. Mary Parish.

=== European colonization ===
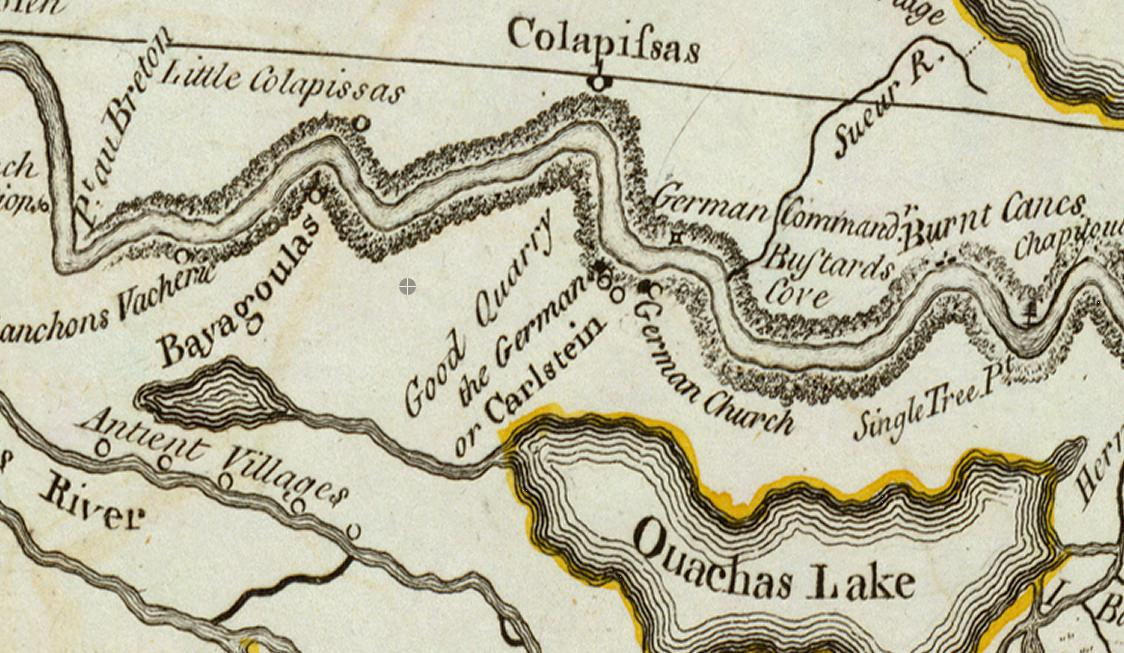
A 1775 map of the German Coast with Colapissas, north of Carlstein, indicating the location of present-day LaPlace.

Present-day LaPlace was settled by German immigrants in the early 18th century during Louisiana's French colonial period, as part of a larger settlement on the bank of the Mississippi called Karlstein. Karlstein was one of the four settlements collectively known as the "German Coast" (French: la Côte des Allemands), having been populated by German-speaking immigrants since 1721. French and Acadians intermarried with the Germans, and the area came to be known as Bonnet Carré (French for "square bonnet"). The name Bonnet Carré was inspired by the right-angle turn of the Mississippi river near the settlement and its resemblance to a square bonnet.

=== 1811 Slave Revolt ===
Manual Andry built Woodland plantation in 1793 and forced enslaved people to cultivate sugarcane there. The amount of money he stole from their forced labor was sizable. Severe violence was inflicted on the enslaved people, as had been common in Haiti (and had led to a successful slave rebellion there).

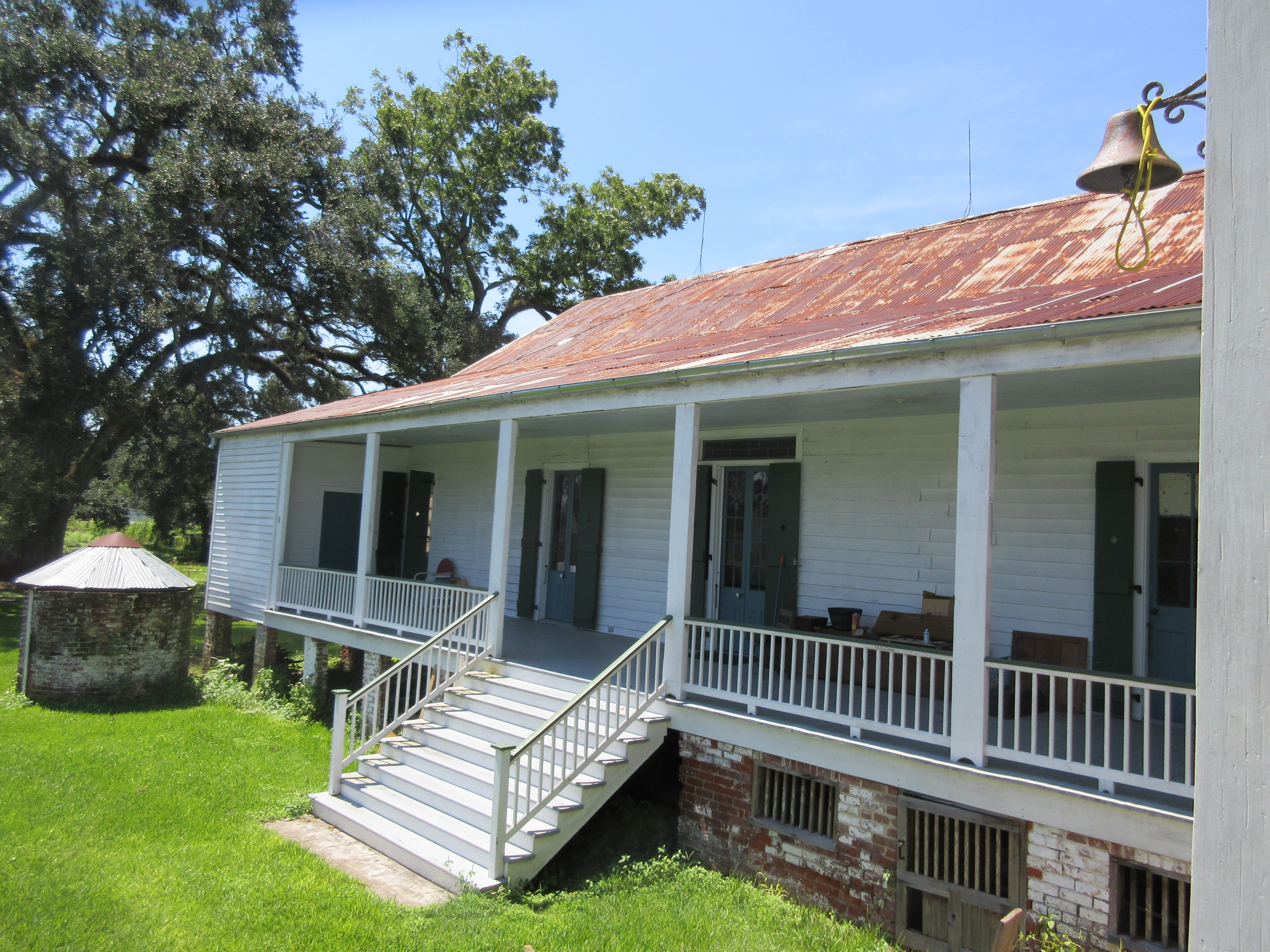
The former Andry Plantation House, now the 1811 Kid Ory Historic House, is where the revolt began.

In early January 1811, slaves at Woodland Plantation and several nearby plantations attempted the German Coast Uprising. A group of 200-500 slaves armed with guns, axes, and cane knives set out from LaPlace to conquer New Orleans and gain freedom for themselves and others. Local white "militia" men crushed the rebellion within three days, and nearly 100 slaves were either killed in battle, slaughtered by pursuing militia, or executed after summary trials by planter tribunals. Although more slaves may have participated in the Black Seminole rebellion in 1836 and the whole of the Second Seminole War, this is now considered the largest slave rebellion.

=== Post-Civil War developments ===
In 1879, pharmacist, planter, and patent medicine purveyor Basile Laplace arrived from New Orleans and established a large plantation in Bonnet Carré. In 1883, he allowed the New Orleans and Baton Rouge Railroad to cut through his land. The settlement's railroad depot was named after Laplace, then the post office, and eventually the town itself.

In the 1920s, Woodland Plantation was bought by the Montegut family, but the most famous person born there may have been Kid Ory, who was born in an outbuilding and later led a successful New Orleans jazz band.

=== Weather events ===
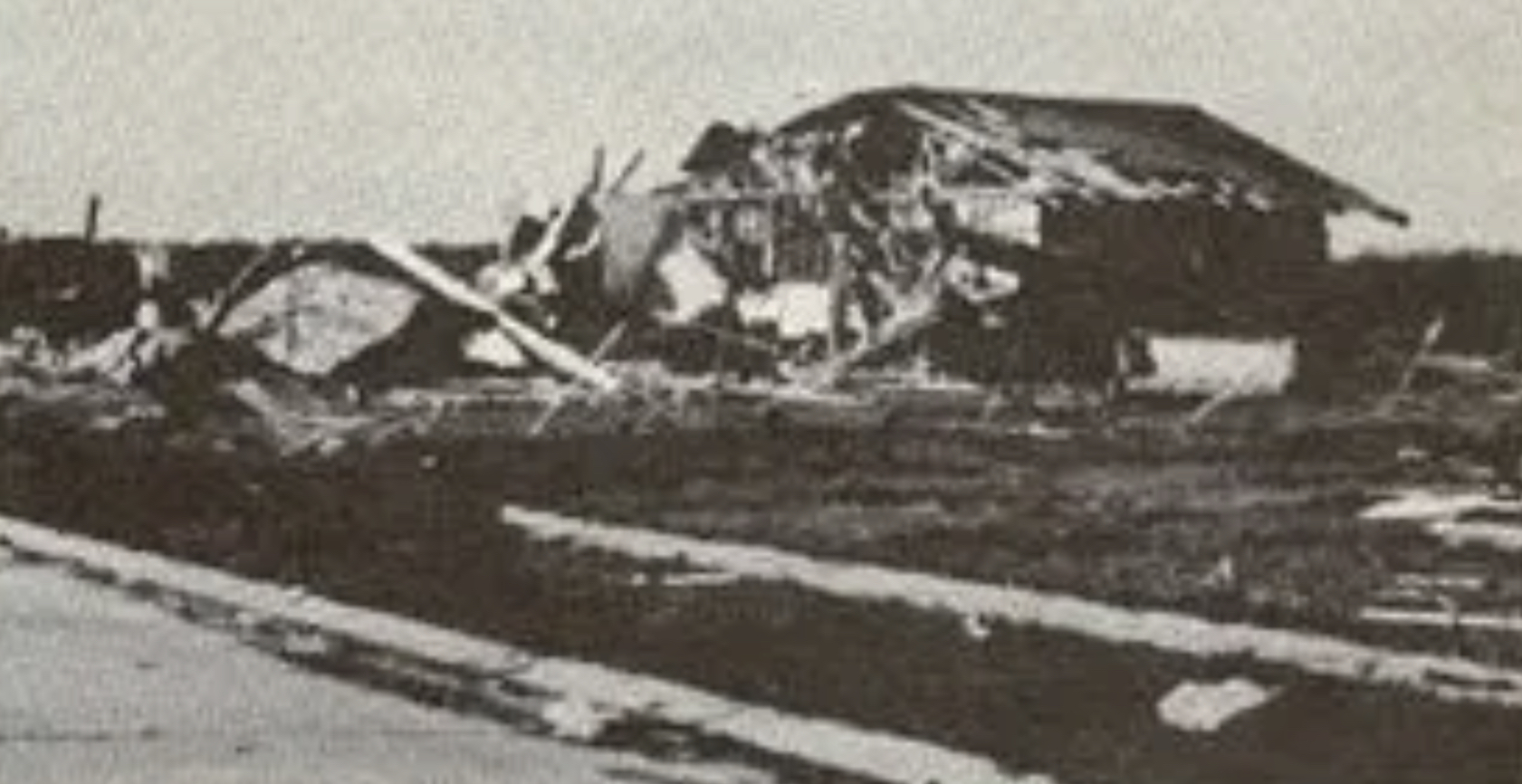
F4 damage to a destroyed home in LaPlace, Louisiana.

In the period between 1850 and 1883, the levee on the east bank of the Mississippi flooded several times. In 1850, a flood created the Bonnet Carré Crevasse, a levee breach that was more than a mile wide. Several major floods were exacerbated by this crevasse near LaPlace, and one resulted in severe flooding of New Orleans in 1871. The breach was closed in 1883.

In 1983, a violent F4 tornado devastated part of the town.

In August 1992, Hurricane Andrew spawned an F3 tornado that killed 2 people.

In 2012, about 5,000 houses were damaged by flooding in LaPlace during Hurricane Isaac.

In February 2016 and again in March 2016, several tornadoes touched down in LaPlace, damaging hundreds of buildings and disrupting power.

LaPlace was badly damaged by Hurricane Ida on August 29, 2021.

=== Spelling ===
Despite the spelling used for LaPlace's namesake, the St. John the Baptist Parish Police Jury decreed in 1971 that the official spelling of the town includes a capital letter "P".

=== Andouille ===
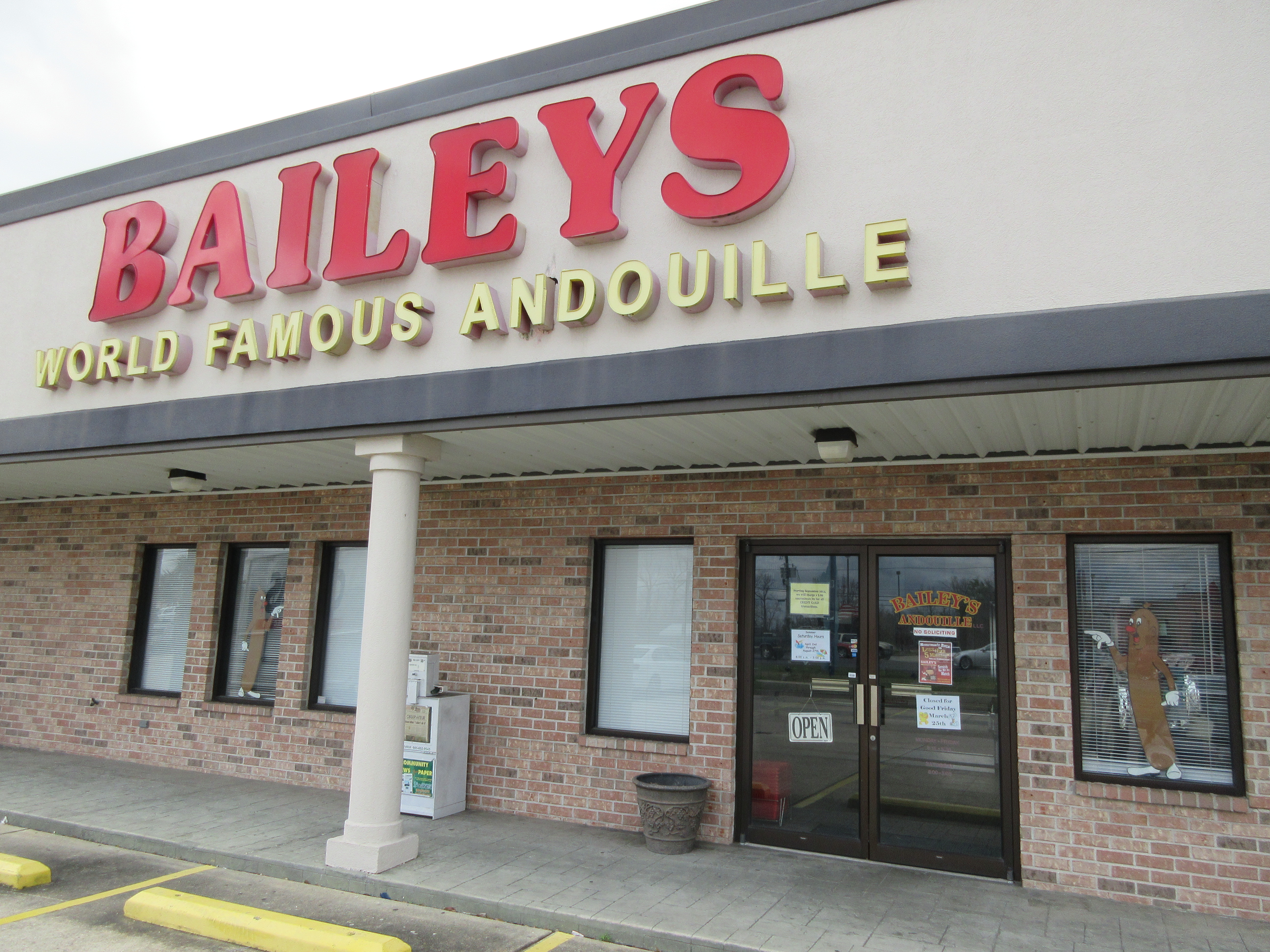
Andouille shop in LaPlace

Andouille, a smoked pork sausage that originated in France, is popular in LaPlace and elsewhere in Louisiana, but in the 1970s, then-Governor Edwin Edwards proclaimed LaPlace the "Official Andouille Capital of the World". Since 1972, LaPlace has held an Andouille Festival every October. On his program Feasting on Asphalt, TV chef Alton Brown visited LaPlace to sample its andouille.

== Industry ==
The Port of South Louisiana is headquartered in LaPlace. Other major employers in the region include Shell Chemical Company, DuPont, ADM Growmark, and ArcelorMittal (formerly Bayou Steel). DuPont sold its Performance Elastomer plant to Denka in 2015. There have been elevated levels of the cancerogenic chemical chloroprene and EPA sued Denka to reduce its emissions. However, in March 2025, the EPA under the new second Trump administration dropped the lawsuit, leading former EPA enforcement director David Uhlmann to say the agency was "fighting for polluters at the expense of a community".

=== Business and civic institutions ===
The River Region Chamber of Commerce is a regional, membership-based business organization founded in 2004. Headquartered in LaPlace, Louisiana, the Chamber serves businesses and community organizations across St. Charles, St. John the Baptist, and St. James parishes. Its activities include business networking, workforce development initiatives, and regional economic and public policy advocacy within the River Parishes.

== Geography ==
LaPlace has an elevation of 10 feet (3.0 m) above sea level.

According to the United States Census Bureau, the CDP has a total area of 22.7 square miles (59 km^{2}), of which 21.5 square miles (56 km^{2}) is land and 1.2 square miles (3.1 km^{2}) (5.29%) is water.

== Demographics ==
Historical population
Census	Pop.	Note	%±
1950	2,352		—
1960	3,541		50.6%
1970	5,953		68.1%
1980	16,112		170.7%
1990	24,194		50.2%
2000	27,684		14.4%
2010	29,872		7.9%
2020	28,841		−3.5%
U.S. Decennial Census; 1950 1960 1970 1980; 1990 2000 2010

LaPlace was first listed as an unincorporated place in the 1950 U.S. census; and then as a census designated place in the 1980 U.S. census.

LaPlace CDP, Louisiana – Racial and ethnic composition Note: the US Census treats Hispanic/Latino as an ethnic category. This table excludes Latinos from the racial categories and assigns them to a separate category. Hispanics/Latinos may be of any race.
Race / Ethnicity (NH = Non-Hispanic)	Pop 2000	Pop 2010	Pop 2020	% 2000	% 2010	% 2020
White alone (NH)	16,329	13,094	9,178	58.98%	43.83%	31.82%
Black or African American alone (NH)	9,814	14,176	15,633	35.45%	47.46%	54.20%
Native American or Alaska Native alone (NH)	79	91	73	0.29%	0.30%	0.25%
Asian alone (NH)	188	274	284	0.68%	0.92%	0.98%
Native Hawaiian or Pacific Islander alone (NH)	6	17	4	0.02%	0.06%	0.01%
Other race alone (NH)	23	38	122	0.08%	0.13%	0.42%
Mixed race or Multiracial (NH)	224	353	828	0.81%	1.18%	2.87%
Hispanic or Latino (any race)	1,021	1,829	2,719	3.69%	6.12%	9.43%
Total	27,684	29,872	28,841	100.00%	100.00%	100.00%

At the 2010 United States census, there were 29,872 people, 11,159 households, and 10,592 families residing in the CDP. The population density was 1,287.8 inhabitants per square mile (497.2/km^{2}). There were 9,888 housing units at an average density of 460.0 per square mile (177.6/km^{2}). The racial makeup of the CDP was 47.0% White, 47.9% African American, 0.4% Native American, 1.0% Asian, 0.1% Pacific Islander, 1.11% from other races, and 1.17% from two or more races. The cultural groups for Hispanic or Latino, of any race, were 6.1% of the population. At the 2019 American Community Survey, there were 29,108 people living in the community, and 28,841 at the 2020 U.S. census. In 2019, the racial and ethnic makeup of LaPlace was 52.1% Black and African American, 41.4% non-Hispanic white, 1.6% Asian, 2.9% some other race, and 2.0% two or more races.

In 2010, there were 9,171 households, out of which 44.9% had children under the age of 18 living with them, 60.4% were married couples living together, 14.9% had a female householder with no husband present, and 20.0% were non-families. 16.4% of all households were made up of individuals, and 4.9% had someone living alone who was 65 years of age or older. The average household size was 2.97 and the average family size was 3.34.

In the CDP, the population was spread out, with 31.2% under the age of 18, 9.4% from 18 to 24, 31.6% from 25 to 44, 21.3% from 45 to 64, and 6.5% who were 65 years of age or older. The median age was 32 years. For every 100 females, there were 96.6 males. For every 100 females age 18 and over, there were 93.8 males. In 2019, the median age was 36.3.

The median income for a household in the CDP was $45,103, and the median income for a family was $50,024 at the 2010 U.S. census. Males had a median income of $39,304 versus $23,277 for females. The per capita income for the CDP was $17,090. About 9.9% of families and 12.1% of the population were below the poverty line, including 15.4% of those under age 18 and 13.0% of those age 65 or over. In 2019, the median household income increased to $53,253 and the poverty rate was 15.3%.

== Education ==
=== Public schools ===
The St. John the Baptist Parish School Board, the school district for the entire parish, operates public schools in LaPlace.

Schools in the LaPlace census-designated place:

- Lake Pontchartrain Elementary School (K-8 school)
  - It was originally named the Glade School. The initial 22-acre (8.9 ha) facility first began operations in 1989 and had a cost of $6 million. Of all of the school district's schools, it had the highest number of students at the time, which exceeded 1,300. In 2005 the school received its next name and had changes in its mascot and school colors. In 2012 Hurricane Isaac damaged the facility. The planned replacement facility is a smaller size than the previous one. In 2014 the estimated cost of the next facility was $22,500,000, and the projected opening year was 2017. Yeates & Yeates Architects was chosen as the architectural firm.
- Laplace Elementary School
- John L. Ory Communications Magnet Elementary School
- Emily C. Watkins Elementary School
  - It opened in 2009. It was originally supposed to open in 2008, but its opening was delayed. By 2011, the school had perennial issues with its HVAC system. In that period, the school had to have colder than planned temperatures to avoid mold and mildew issues.
- St. John Special Education

Schools in other unincorporated areas with LaPlace postal addresses:

- East St. John Preparatory Academy (formerly East St. John Elementary School) (Reserve CDP, LaPlace postal address) - The Times-Picayune describes the school as being in LaPlace. It had a fire in 2015, and its 65,000-square-foot (6,000 m^{2}) replacement facility opened in 2018. It became a 5-8 school only in 2017. In 2025 East St. John Preparatory School is to be renamed Fifth Ward Preparatory School, as the former Fifth Ward Elementary School in Reserve will close that year.

Prior to 2017, the following schools had attendance boundaries including sections of the LaPlace CDP: East St. John, LaPlace, Lake Ponchartrain, and Watkins elementary schools.

East St. John High School is in Reserve CDP.

Other schools:

- St. John STEM Magnet Program (Reserve postal address)

=== Private and parochial schools ===
Private schools in LaPlace CDP include the following Catholic schools (Roman Catholic Archdiocese of New Orleans)

- Ascension of Our Lord School
- St. Joan of Arc Catholic School
- Saint Charles Catholic High School

These two non-Catholic Christian private schools are in Reserve CDP:

- Liberty Christian Academy
- Riverside Academy

== List of movie and television appearances ==
- The Academy Award-winning movie Monster's Ball, starring Halle Berry and Billy Bob Thornton.
- The television series Memphis Beat.
- Various scenes of the WWE Studios movie Knucklehead.
- The Old Airline Motors Diner on Airline Highway in LaPlace doubled as an IHOP in the movie Glory Road.
- The Jonas Brothers music video "Pom Poms" featured the Joe Keller Memorial Stadium in nearby Reserve, Louisiana.

== Notable people ==
- Russell Batiste Jr., drummer who played for the funky Meters. He lived and died in LaPlace.
- Jared Butler, basketball player for Baylor University
- A. J. Duhe, Louisiana State University alumnus, former linebacker for the Miami Dolphins
- Randal Gaines, attorney and Louisiana State Representative for St. Charles and St. John the Baptist parishes since 2012
- Louis Lipps, former wide receiver for the Pittsburgh Steelers and the New Orleans Saints
- Chris Markey, former running back for the UCLA Bruins
- Damon Mason, defensive back and coach in the Arena Football League
- Edward "Kid" Ory, trombonist and bandleader
- DeQuincy Scott, football player
- Ian Villafana, guitarist

== Media ==
Cable and Internet services in LaPlace are provided by Reserve Telecommunications.

== See also ==
- Reserve, Louisiana
- Lake Pontchartrain
- Bonnet Carré Spillway
- Hurricane Katrina
- River Road, Louisiana
