= 1811 Kid Ory Historic House =

Museum in LaPlace, Louisiana

Coordinates: 30°03′39″N 90°28′58″W

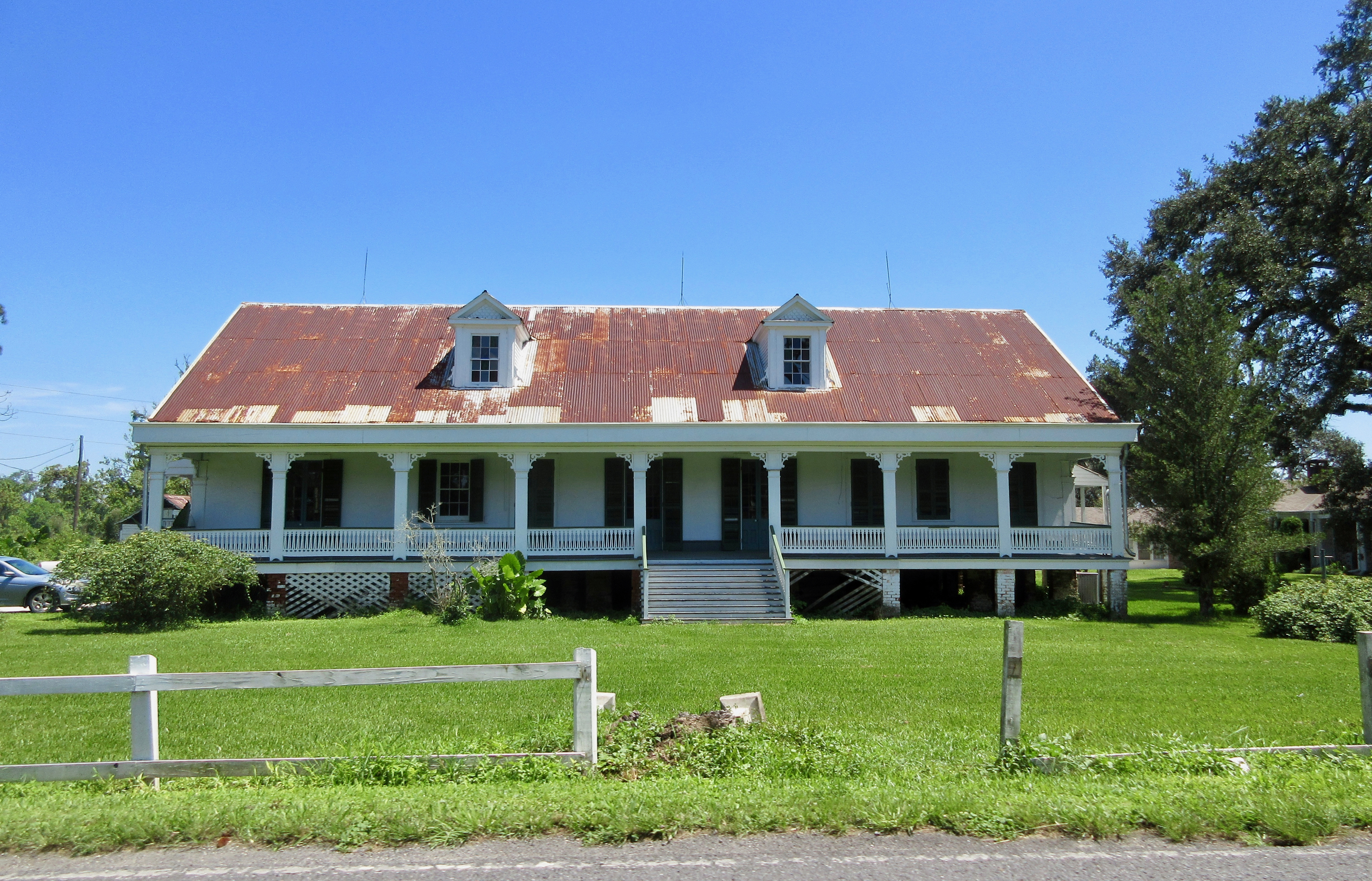
Exterior view 2022

The Bonnet Carre Historical Center, also known as the 1811 Kid Ory Historic House, is a museum in LaPlace, Louisiana, housed in a historic plantation house formerly known by names including Andry Plantation and Woodland Plantation. It focuses on the 1811 German Coast uprising, which Charles Deslondes started there, and the life of jazz pioneer Kid Ory, born here in 1886. Other exhibits include antique phonographs and history of plantation life.

The museum was originally operated by former journalist John McCusker and, after a temporary closure during the COVID-19 pandemic, reopened under the auspices of the historical center with support from the agribusiness firm Greenfield Louisiana.

The museum once again closed in October 2022 due prohibitive costs resulting from the aftermath of Hurricane Ida, despite the support from Greenfield. Owner Timothy Sheehan sold the property to sisters Joy and Jo Banner of The Descendants Project in January 2024, who intend to utilize the property to preserve local Black history and environmental health.
