= New Orleans Owls =

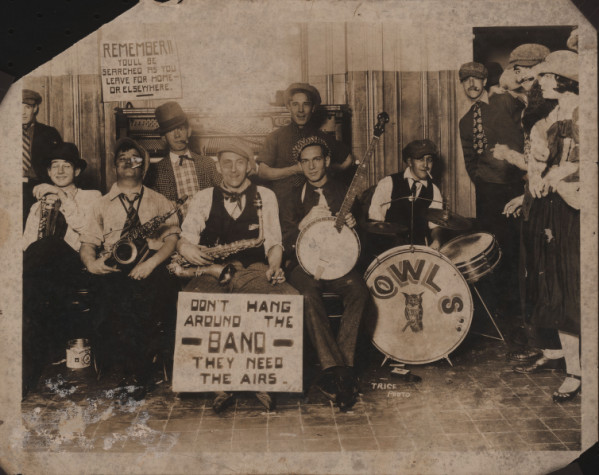
The New Orleans Owls in 1922

The New Orleans Owls (active 1922–29) were an early jazz band from New Orleans that descended from The Invincibles String band and recorded 23 sides for Columbia from 1925 to 1927 on 78 rpm phonograph record. They are reportedly the first group to record by the electric system operating from a mobile recording van. They played principally for the dancers in the ballroom of the Roosevelt Hotel in New Orleans. They replaced Abbie Brunies' Halfway House Orchestra at the Halfway House dancehall in the late 1920s.

Members included Bill Padron (very much in the Paul Mares school) (ct), Benjie White (cl, as, leader), Lester Smith (ts), Mose Farrar (p), Rene Gelpi (bjo, g), Dan LeBlanc (tu), Earl Crumb (d), Frank Netto (tb), Pinky Vidacovitch (cl, as) and Sigfre Christensen (p). Their records are not as collectible as those of similar bands like the New Orleans Rhythm Kings or the Friar's Society Orchestra, but will still fetch a hundred dollars or more at auction if they are in excellent condition.
