= Lawrence Duhé =

American jazz musician (1887–1960)

Lawrence Duhé (April 30, 1887 – 1960), also known as Lawrence Duhe, was an early jazz clarinetist and bandleader.

== Early life ==
Duhé was born in LaPlace, Louisiana, on April 30, 1887. His father, Evariste, worked in a sugar mill and played the violin. Lawrence played with his three brothers in the Duhe Brothers Band, and their two sisters played piano and organ in churches.

== Later life and career ==
Duhé was part of Kid Ory's band and followed the trombonist to New Orleans in 1910. They separated around 18 months later, and Duhé led his own band in Storyville. In 1917 he moved to Chicago, where his band played in dance halls and performed at the 1919 World Series. In 1923 he returned to New Orleans and played for most of the next decade in bands led by trumpeter Evan Thomas and trombonist Gus Fortinet. After touring with the Rabbit's Foot minstrel show he worked in Lafayette, Louisiana with trumpeter Frank Brown. Duhé retired from music in 1945 and died in Lafayette in 1960. Grove reports that, "Despite his prominence in the history of early jazz, Duhé is not known to have made any recordings that were issued commercially."
