= King Oliver =

American jazz cornet player and bandleader (1881–1938)

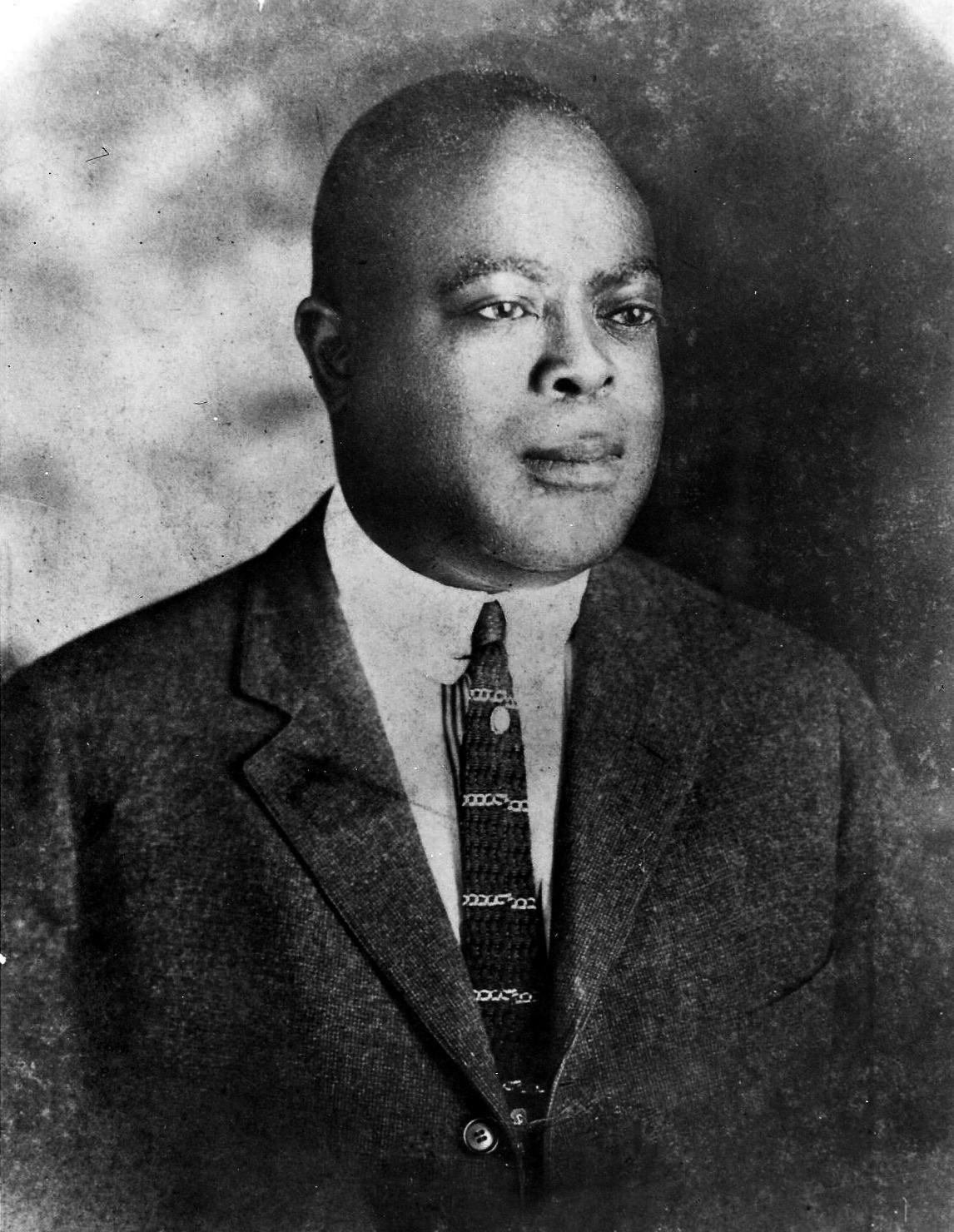
- Oliver, c. 1915

Background information
- Born: Joseph Nathan Oliver; December 19, 1881; Aben, Louisiana, U.S.
- Died: c. April 10, 1938 (aged 56) Savannah, Georgia, U.S.
- Genres: Jazz; Dixieland
- Occupations: Musician, bandleader
- Instrument: Cornet
- Years active: 1907−1937
- Formerly of: Kid Ory; Creole Jazz Band; Lawrence Duhé; King Oliver and his Creole Jazz Band; King Oliver and his Dixie Syncopators

Joseph Nathan "King" Oliver (December 19, 1881 – c. April 10, 1938) was an American jazz cornet player and bandleader. He was particularly recognized for his playing style and his pioneering use of mutes in jazz. Also a notable composer, he wrote many tunes still played today, including "Dippermouth Blues", "Sweet Like This", "Canal Street Blues", and "Doctor Jazz". He was the mentor and teacher of Louis Armstrong. His influence was such that Armstrong claimed, "if it had not been for Joe Oliver, jazz would not be what it is today."

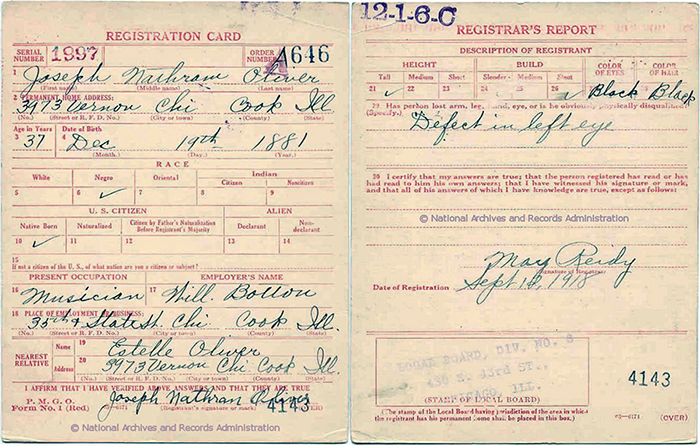
Joe "King" Oliver's Draft Card, signed September 12, 1918, in Chicago

== Biography ==
=== Life ===
Joseph Nathan Oliver was born in Aben, Louisiana, near Donaldsonville in Ascension Parish, to Nathan Oliver and Virginia "Jinnie" Jones. He claimed 1881 as his year of birth in his draft registration in September 1918 (two months before the end of World War I) but that year is open to debate, with some census records and other sources suggesting 1884 or 1885 as his true year of birth.

He moved to New Orleans in his youth. He first studied the trombone, then changed to cornet. From 1908 to 1917, he played cornet in New Orleans brass bands and dance bands and in the city's red-light district, which came to be known as Storyville. A band he co-led with trombonist Kid Ory was considered one of the best and hottest in New Orleans in the late 1910s. He was popular in New Orleans across economic and racial lines and was in demand for music jobs of all kinds.

According to an oral history interview at Tulane University's Hogan Jazz Archive with Oliver's widow, Stella, a fight broke out at a dance where Oliver was playing, and the police arrested him, his band, and the fighters.

In September 1911, he married Estelle "Stella" Dominick in New Orleans. He continued to work at the Dreamland, forming a band there in January 1920, which included Johnny Dodds, Honoré Dutrey, and Lil Hardin, the nucleus of his famous Creole Jazz Band. After Storyville closed, he moved to Chicago in 1918 with his wife and step-daughter, Ruby Tuesday Oliver (born 1905).

Noticeably different in his approach were faster tempos, unlike the slow drags in the African-American dance halls of New Orleans. In Chicago, he found work with colleagues from New Orleans, such as clarinetist Lawrence Duhé, bassist Bill Johnson, trombonist Roy Palmer, and drummer Paul Barbarin. He became leader of Duhé's band, playing at a number of Chicago clubs. In the summer of 1921, he took a group to the West Coast, playing engagements in San Francisco and Oakland, California. On the west coast, Oliver and his band engaged with the vaudeville tradition, performing in plantation outfits.

Oliver and his band returned to Chicago in 1922, where they started playing in the Lincoln Gardens as King Oliver and his Creole Jazz Band. In addition to Oliver on cornet, the personnel included his protégé Louis Armstrong on second cornet, Baby Dodds on drums, Johnny Dodds on clarinet, Lil Hardin (later Armstrong's wife) on piano, Honoré Dutrey on trombone, and Bill Johnson on double bass. Recordings made by this group in 1923 for Gennett, Okeh, Paramount, and Columbia demonstrated the New Orleans style of collective improvisation, also known as Dixieland, and brought it to a larger audience. Because they were recording acousticly into a horn that was directly connected to the needle making the record master, Armstrong notably had to stand in the corner of the room, away from the horn, because his powerful playing bounced the needle off the master. In addition, white musicians would visit Lincoln Gardens in order to learn from Oliver and his band. Because Lincoln Gardens was in Chicago's black neighborhood and only admitted blacks, the white players listened outside near the front door. A prospective tour in the midwestern states ultimately broke up the band in 1924.

In the mid-1920s Oliver enlarged his band to nine musicians, performing under the name King Oliver and his Dixie Syncopators, and began using more written arrangements with jazz solos. This band led by Oliver at the Plantation Café was in direct competition with Louis Armstrong's Sunset Stompers, who performed at the Sunset Café. In 1927 the band went to New York, but he disbanded it to do freelance jobs. In the later 1920s, he struggled with playing trumpet due to his gum disease, so he employed others to handle the solos, including his nephew Dave Nelson, Louis Metcalf, and Red Allen. He reunited the band in 1928, recording for Victor Talking Machine Company one year later. He continued with modest success until a downturn in the economy made it more difficult to find bookings. His periodontitis made playing the trumpet progressively difficult. He quit playing music in 1937.

=== Work and influence ===
Dippermouth Blues
1923 recording by King Oliver's Creole Jazz Band featuring Louis Armstrong

As a player, Oliver took great interest in altering his horn's sound. He pioneered the use of mutes, including the rubber plumber's plunger, derby hat, bottles and cups. His favorite mute was a small metal mute made by the C.G. Conn Instrument Company, with which he played his famous solo on his composition the "Dippermouth Blues" (an early nickname for fellow cornetist Louis Armstrong). His recording "Wa Wa Wa" with the Dixie Syncopators can be credited with giving the name wah-wah to such techniques. This "freak" style of trumpet playing was also featured in his composition, "Eccentric." One of his protégés, Louis Panico (cornetist with the Isham Jones Orchestra), authored a book entitled The Novelty Cornetist, which is illustrated with photos showing some of the mute techniques he learned from Oliver.

Oliver was also a talented composer, and wrote many tunes that are still regularly played, including "Dippermouth Blues," "Sweet Like This," "Canal Street Blues," and "Doctor Jazz." "Dippermouth Blues," for example, was adapted by Don Redman for Fletcher Henderson's Orchestra under the new name of "Sugar Foot Stomp".

Oliver performed mostly on cornet, but like many cornetists he switched to trumpet in the late 1920s. He credited jazz pioneer Buddy Bolden as an early influence, and in turn was a major influence on numerous younger cornet/trumpet players in New Orleans and Chicago, including Tommy Ladnier, Paul Mares, Muggsy Spanier, Johnny Wiggs, Frank Guarente and, the most famous of all, Armstrong.

As mentor to Armstrong in New Orleans, Oliver taught young Louis and gave him his job in Kid Ory's band when he went to Chicago. A few years later Oliver summoned him to Chicago to play with his band. Louis remembered Oliver as "Papa Joe" and considered him his idol and inspiration. In his autobiography, Satchmo: My Life in New Orleans, Armstrong wrote: "It was my ambition to play as he did. I still think that if it had not been for Joe Oliver, Jazz would not be what it is today. He was a creator in his own right."

== Hardships in later years, decline and death ==
Oliver's business acumen could not equal his musical skill. A succession of managers stole money from him, and he tried to negotiate more money for his band than the Savoy Ballroom was willing to pay – losing the job. He lost the chance of an important engagement at New York City's famous Cotton Club when he held out for more money; young Duke Ellington took the job and subsequently catapulted to fame.

The Great Depression brought hardship to Oliver. He lost his life savings to a collapsed bank in Chicago, and he struggled to keep his band together through a series of hand-to-mouth gigs until the group broke up.

Oliver also had health problems, such as pyorrhea, a gum disease that was partly caused by his love of sugar sandwiches and it made it very difficult for him to play and he soon began delegating solos to younger players, but by 1935, he could no longer play the trumpet at all. Oliver was stranded in Savannah, Georgia, where he pawned his trumpet and finest suits and briefly ran a fruit stall, then he worked as a janitor at Wimberly's Recreation Hall (526–528 West Broad Street).

Oliver died in poverty "of arteriosclerosis, too broke to afford treatment" in a Savannah rooming house around April 1938. His sister spent her rent money to have his body brought to New York, where he was buried at Woodlawn Cemetery in The Bronx. Armstrong and other loyal musician friends were in attendance.

== Honors and awards ==
Oliver was inducted as a charter member of the Gennett Records Walk of Fame in Richmond, Indiana in 2007.

== Discography ==
- 1923-00 - Off the Record: The Complete 1923 Jazz Band Recordings (Archeophone, 2006)
- 1926-27 - Sugar Foot Stomp_Vocalion & Brunswick Recordings Vol. 1 (Frog, 2000)
- 1927-31 - Farewell Blues_Vocalion & Brunswick Recordings Vol. 2 (Frog, 2000)
- 1929-30 - King Oliver 1929-30 (2xCD) (JSP, 1991)

NOTE: The Joe King Oliver recording legacy is also available in the four volumes of The Chronological serie (1923-31) Classics. I've chosen the above editions for the alternate takes, some minor items, and especially a better audio restoration and remastering.

=== Anthologies ===
- 1923-30 - Dippermouth Blues: HIs 25 Greatest (ASV Living Era, 1996)
- 1923–1930 - Great Original Performances 1923–1930 (Louisiana Red Hot, 1998)
- 1923–1931 - A Career Anthology 1923-31 (Five CDs) (Acrobat, 2024) near the complete JKO at a low price

== Bibliography ==
- Walter C. Allen, Brian A. L. Rust, King Joe Oliver, Jazz Monographs No. 1, October 1955, published by Walter C. Allen Beleville, N.J. (reprinted in 1956 with the same title and publisher)
- Williams Martin, King Oliver, Cassell & co. Ltd, 1960

== List of compositions (incomplete) ==
Title	Rec. date	co-composer	Title	Rec. date	co-composer	Title	Rec. date	co-composer
"Working Man Blues"			"The Trumpet's Prayer"			"Rhythm Club Stomp"		Nelson
"Snag it"			"Can I Tell You"			"You're Just My Type"		Nelson
"Sugar Foot Stomp"			"My Good Man Sam"		Nelson	"Edna"		Nelson
"Doctor Jazz"			"Sweet Like This"		Nelson	"Boogie Woogie"		Nelson
"Showboat Shuffle"			"Too Late"		Nelson	"Mule Face Blues"		Nelson
"Every Tub"			"I'm Lonesome Sweetheart"		Nelson	"Don't You Think I Love You?"		
"West End Blues"			"I Want You Just Myself"			"Olga"		Nelson
"Speakeasy Blues"			"I Can't Stop Loving You"		Nelson	"Nelson Stomp"		Nelson
"I'm Watching The Clock"			"New Orleans Shout"		Nelson	"Stop Crying"		
"Slow and Steady"		Delaney	"I Must Have It"					
