= Kid Ory =

American jazz trombonist (1886–1973)

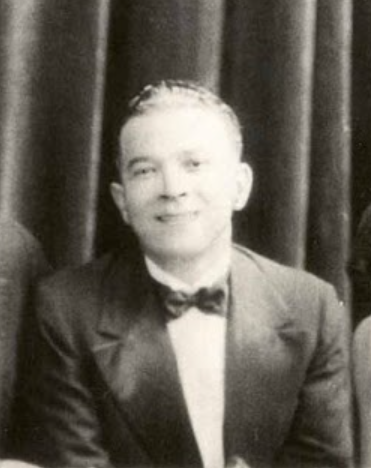

Background information
- Born: Edouard Ory; December 25, 1886; LaPlace, Louisiana, U.S.
- Died: January 23, 1973 (aged 86) Honolulu, Hawaii, U.S.
- Genres: Jazz; traditional Creole
- Occupations: Musician; composer; promoter
- Instrument: Trombone
- Years active: 1910–1966
- Labels: Columbia, Okeh Records, Exner, Crescent, Good Time Jazz, Verve
- Formerly of: Kid Ory's Sunshine Orchestra; Louis Armstrong's Hot Five
- Spouse: Elizabeth Barbara

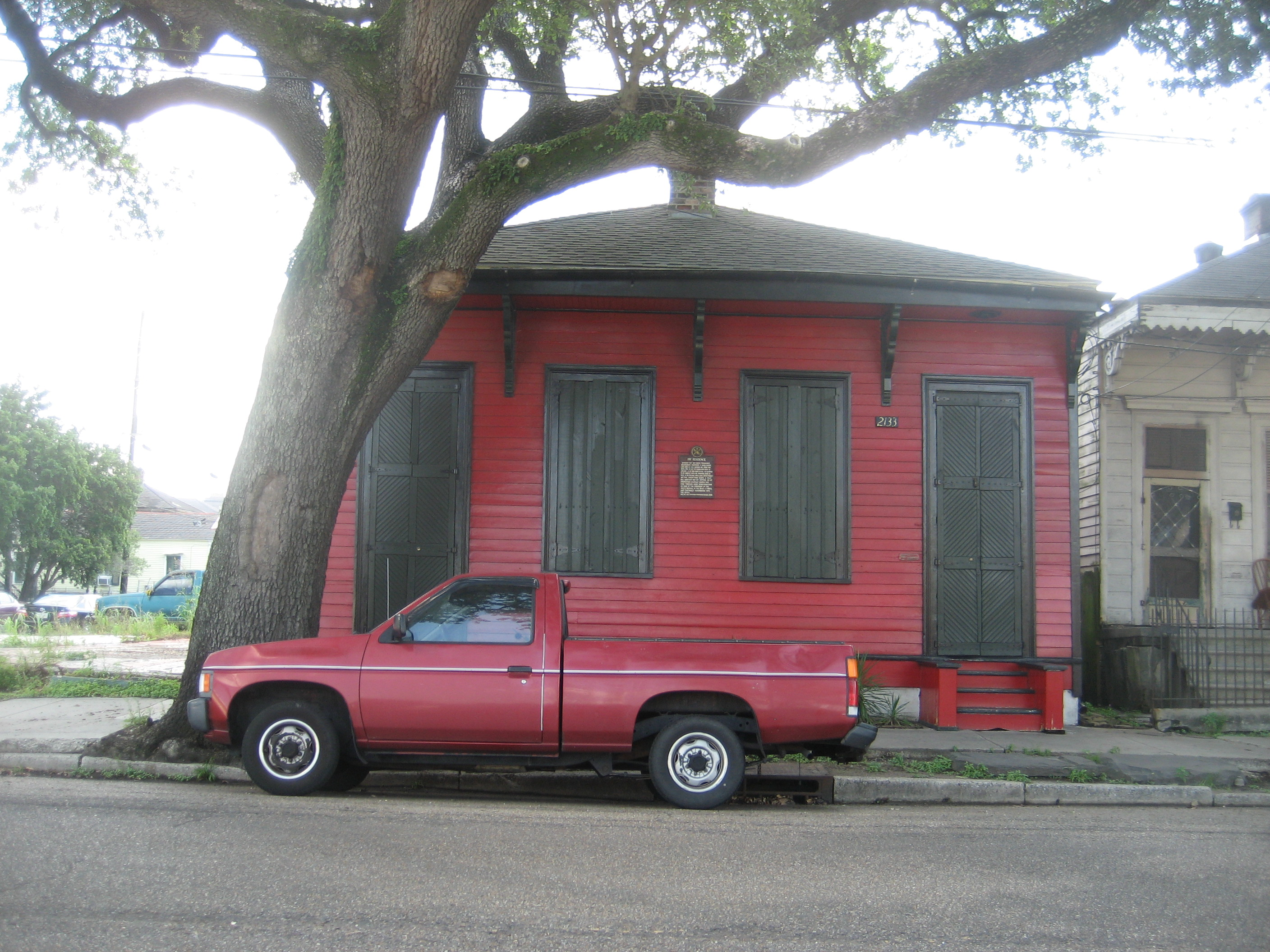
House on Jackson Avenue, New Orleans, Ory's residence in the 1910s

Edward "Kid" Ory (December 25, 1886 – January 23, 1973) was an American jazz composer, trombonist, and bandleader. One of the early users of the glissando technique, he helped establish it as a central element of New Orleans jazz.

He was born near LaPlace, Louisiana, and moved to New Orleans on his 21st birthday, to Los Angeles in 1910, and to Chicago in 1925. The Ory band later was an important force in reviving interest in New Orleans jazz, making radio broadcasts on The Orson Welles Almanac program in 1944, among other shows. In 1944–45, the group made a series of recordings for the Crescent label, which was founded by Nesuhi Ertegun for the express purpose of recording Ory's band.

Ory retired from music in 1966 and spent his last years in Hawaii, where he died from a heart attack.

== Early life ==
Ory was born in 1886 to a Louisiana French–speaking family of Black Creole descent, on Woodland Plantation in LaPlace, now the site of the 1811 Kid Ory Historic House. Ory began playing music with homemade instruments in his childhood, and by his teens, he was leading a well-regarded band in southeast Louisiana. He kept LaPlace as his base of operations because of family obligations until his 21st birthday, when he moved his band to New Orleans.

Ory was a banjo player during his youth, and it is said that his ability to play the banjo helped him develop "tailgate", a particular style of playing the trombone with a rhythmic line underneath the trumpets and cornets. His use of glissando helped establish it as a central element of New Orleans Jazz.

When Ory was living on Jackson Avenue, he was discovered by Buddy Bolden, playing his first new trombone, instead of an old Civil War trombone. Ory's sister said he was too young to play with Bolden.

== Career ==
He moved his six-piece band to New Orleans in 1910. Ory had one of the best-known bands in New Orleans in the 1910s, hiring many of the great jazz musicians of the city, including the cornetists Joe "King" Oliver, Mutt Carey, and Louis Armstrong, who joined the band in 1919; and the clarinetists Johnny Dodds and Jimmie Noone.

"Ory's Creole Trombone"
A 1921 recording of "Ory's Creole Trombone"

In 1919, he moved to Los Angeles—one of several New Orleans musicians to do so at the time—and he recorded there in 1922 with a band that included Mutt Carey, the clarinetist and pianist Dink Johnson, and the string bassist Ed Garland. Garland and Carey were long-time associates who would still be playing with Ory during his 1940s comeback. While in Los Angeles, Ory and his band recorded two instrumentals, "Ory's Creole Trombone" and "Society Blues", as well as a number of songs. They were the first jazz recordings made on the West Coast by an African American jazz band from New Orleans, Louisiana. His band recorded with Nordskog Records; Ory paid Nordskog for the pressings and then sold them with his own label, "Kid Ory's Sunshine Orchestra", at Spikes Brothers Music Store in Los Angeles.

In 1925, Ory moved to Chicago, where he was very active, working and recording with Louis Armstrong, Jelly Roll Morton, Oliver, Johnny Dodds, Bessie Smith, Ma Rainey, and many others. He mentored Benny Goodman and, later, Charles Mingus. He was said to have attempted to take trombone lessons from a "German guy" who played in the Chicago symphony, but Ory was turned away after a few lessons. The Chicago symphony has three German trombonists listed as former members in 1925, Arthur Stange (principal), Arthur Gunther, and Edward Geffer. Ory was a member of the original lineup of Louis Armstrong's Hot Five which first recorded on November 12, 1925. His composition "Muskrat Ramble" was included in the Hot Five session in February 1926.

During the Great Depression Ory retired from music and did not play again until 1943. In 1941, he was a pallbearer at the funeral of Jelly Roll Morton in Los Angeles, California. He ran a chicken farm in Los Angeles. From 1944 to about 1961, he led one of the top New Orleans–style bands of the period. His sidemen during this period included, in addition to Carey and Garland, the trumpeters Alvin Alcorn and Teddy Buckner; the clarinetists Darnell Howard, Jimmie Noone, Albert Nicholas, Barney Bigard, and George Probert; the pianists Buster Wilson, Cedric Haywood, and Don Ewell; and the drummer Minor Hall. All but Buckner, Probert, and Ewell were originally from New Orleans.

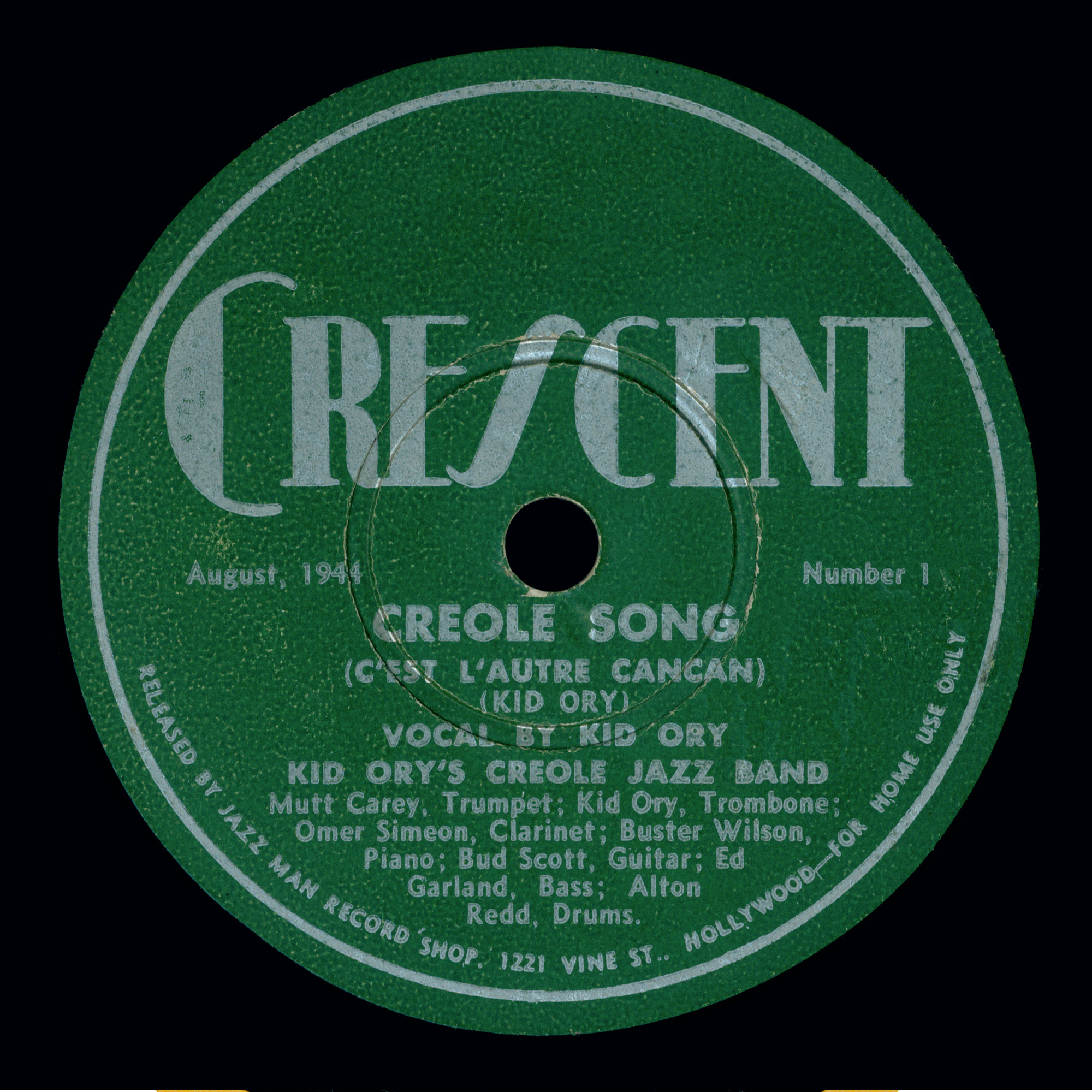
Nesuhi Ertegun founded his first label, Crescent Records, to record Kid Ory's Creole Jazz Band. (Crescent Number 1, August 1944)

The Ory band was an important force in reviving interest in New Orleans jazz, making popular 1940s radio broadcasts that began with weekly spots on The Orson Welles Almanac program (from March 15, 1944). In 1944–1945, the group made a series of recordings for the Crescent label, which was founded by Nesuhi Ertegun for the express purpose of recording Ory's band.

During the late 1940s and early 1950s, Ory and his group appeared at the Beverly Cavern in Los Angeles. In 1958, he purchased the Tin Angel nightclub in San Francisco from Peggy Tolk–Watkins, and he renamed it On-The-Levee. The nightclub closed in July 1961, and in 1962 the building was demolished due to the creation of the Embarcadero Freeway.

== Personal life ==
Ory retired from music in 1966, and spent his last years in Hawaii, with the assistance of Trummy Young. Ory died of pneumonia and a heart attack in Honolulu. He was buried at Holy Cross Cemetery, Culver City, California.

He had no children with his first wife, Elizabeth. He had a daughter, Babette, with his second wife, Barbara, in 1954. Ory was Catholic, baptized at St Peter Church in Reserve, Louisiana.

== Legacy ==
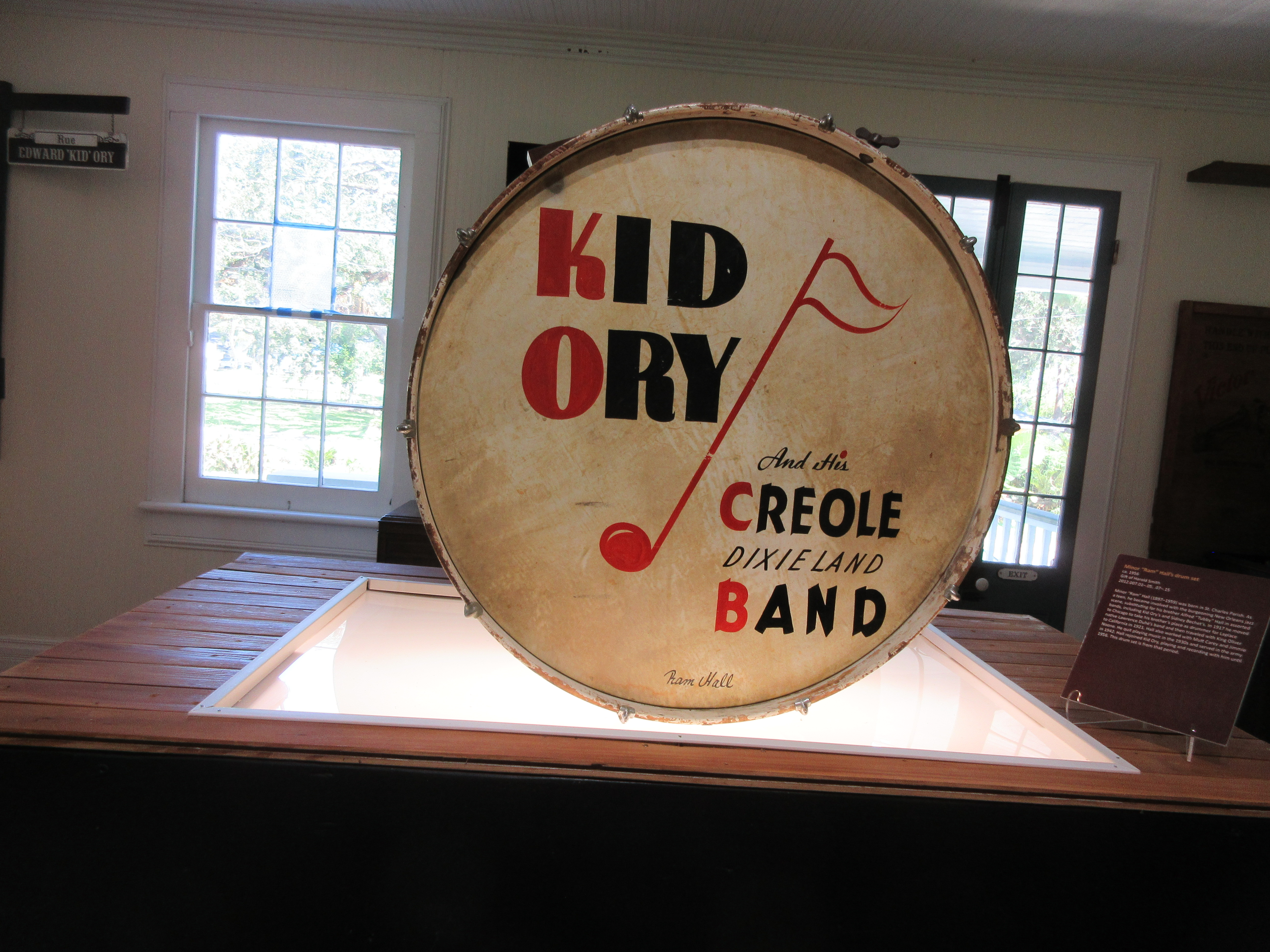
Bass drum used by drummer Ram Hall in Kid Ory's Creole Jazz Band, with front head painted promoting the band, on display at 1811 Kid Ory Historic House, LaPlace, Louisiana

In 2021, the 1811 Kid Ory Historic House opened on the site of Woodland Plantation in LaPlace, Louisiana, which is in the National Register of Historic Places of the United States. The museum is dedicated both to the 1811 German Coast uprising of enslaved people and to Ory.

== Partial discography ==
- 1922-45 The Chronological (Classics, 1999)
- 1945-50 The Chronological (Classics, 2001)
- 1944-45 Kid Ory's Creole Jazz Band (EPM, 1997) Jazz Archives
- 1947 Kid Ory at the Green Room, Vol. 1 (American Recordings, 1992)
- 1947 Kid Ory at the Green Room, Vol. 2 (American Recordings, 1992)
- 1948 Kid Ory Live (Vault, 1968)
- 1949 Live at the Beverly Cavern (504 Recs, 2000)
- 1949-52 Edward Kid Ory and His Creole Band at the Dixieland Jubilee (Dixieland Jubilee, 1978) Reissued as (GNP Crescendo, 1997)
- 1950 Kid Ory The Great New Orleans Trombonist (CBS, 1956)
- 1950 Kid Ory and His Creole Dixieland Band (Columbia)
- 1951 At the Beverly Cavern (Sounds)
- 1953 Kid Ory Plays The Blues (Storyville, 1985)
- 1953 Live at Club Hangover, Vol. 1 (Dawn Club)
- 1953 Creole Jazz Band at Club Hangover (Storyville)
- 1953-56 This Kid's the Greatest! (Good Time Jazz, )
- 1954 Live at Club Hangover, Vol. 3 (Dawn Club)
- 1954 Live at Club Hangover, Vol. 4 (Dawn Club)
- 1954 Kid Ory's Creole Jazz Band (Good Time Jazz)
- 1954 Creole Jazz Band (Good Time Jazz)
- 1954 Kid Ory's Creole Band/Johnny Wittwer Trio (Jazz Man)
- 1955 Sounds of New Orleans, Vol. 9 (Storyville)
- 1954 Kid Ory's Creole Jazz Band (Good Time Jazz, 1956)
- 1956 The Legendary Kid (Good Time Jazz)
- 1956.06 Favorites (Good Time Jazz/Vogue, 1958) Reissued many times available in CD
- 1956 Kid Ory in Europe (Verve,)
- 1957 Dance with Kid Ory or Just Listen (Verve,1960)
- 1957 Song of the Wanderer (Verve, 1958)
- 1957 The Kid from New Orleans: Ory That Is
- 1957 The Original Jazz (Verve, 1961)
- 1959 Plays W.C. Handy (Verve, )
- 1957 Kid Ory Sings French Traditional Songs (Verve)
- 1959 In Denmark (Storyville, 1998)
- 1959 At the Jazz Band Ball (Rhapsody)
- 1960 Dixieland Marching Songs (Verve)
- 1961 Storyville Nights (Verve)

With Red Allen

- 1957 Red Allen, Kid Ory & Jack Teagarden at Newport (Verve)

== Sources and further reading ==
- Marcus, Kenneth H. (2004). Musical Metropolis: Los Angeles and the Creation of a Music Culture, 1880-1940. New York: Palgrave Macmillan. ISBN 978-1-4039-6419-9.
- McCusker, John (August 11, 2012). Creole Trombone: Kid Ory and the Early Years of Jazz. Jackson, Miss: Univ. Press of Mississippi. ISBN 978-1-61703-626-2.
