= Aben, Louisiana =

- Unincorporated community
- Location within Louisiana Location within the United States
- Coordinates: 30°06′29″N 90°56′34″W
- Country: United States
- State: Louisiana
- Parish: Ascension
- Elevation: 16 ft (4.9 m)
- Time zone: UTC-6 (Central (CST))
  - Summer (DST): UTC-5 (CDT)
- Area code: 225
- GNIS feature ID: 532068

Aben is an unincorporated community in Ascension Parish, Louisiana, United States. Aben is located south and east of a bend in the Mississippi River, 3 miles (4.8 km) east of Donaldsonville, but as the Mississippi generally runs north to south, Aben is considered to be on the west bank of the river. Louisiana Highway 18 passes through the community.
