= Mister Johnson =

Mister Johnson may refer to:

- Mister Johnson (novel), 1939 novel by Irish author Joyce Cary
  - Mister Johnson (play), 1956 stage adaptation of the novel by Norman Rosten
  - Mister Johnson (film), 1990 film adaptation of the novel
- "Mister Johnson", 1929 American folk song by Uncle Dave Macon and Sid Harkreader

== See also ==
- Mr. Johnson (disambiguation)
- List of people with surname Johnson
