= Ceiling Unlimited =

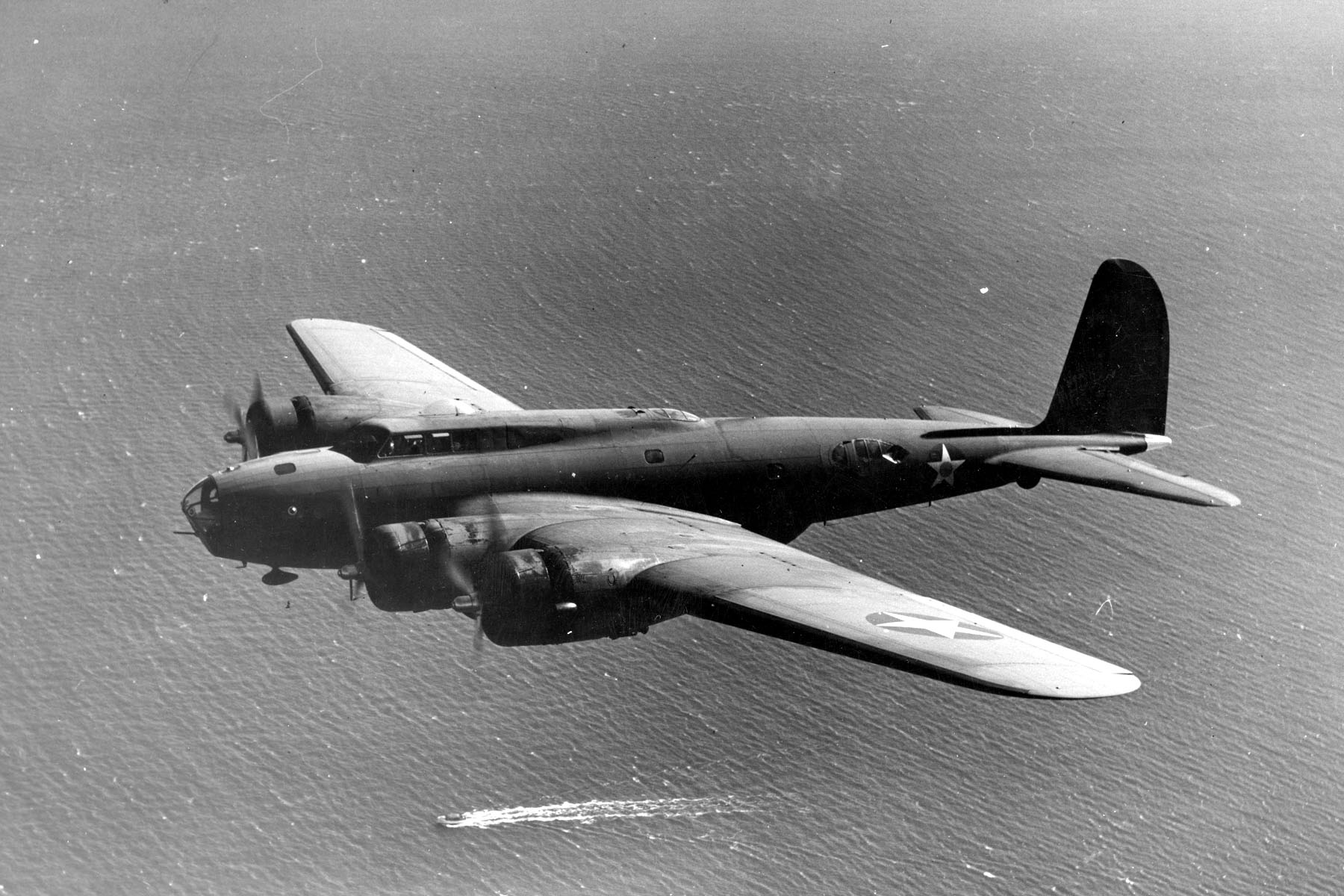
- Flying Fortress (The Swoose)
- Genre: Anthology series; Aviation; Variety-musical (second season)
- Running time: 15 minutes (1942–1943); 30 minutes (1943–1944)
- Country of origin: United States
- Language: English
- Home station: CBS
- Hosted by: Orson Welles (episodes 1–13); Various (episodes 14–33); James Hilton (episodes 34–39); Joseph Cotten (second season)
- Starring: Various
- Created by: Orson Welles
- Written by: Orson Welles (episodes 1–13); Arthur Miller; Harry Kronman; Winston Norman; Mandred Lloyd; Harry Kronman; others
- Directed by: Orson Welles (episodes 1–13)
- Produced by: Orson Welles (episodes 1–13); Thomas Freebairn-Smith (after February 1943)
- Narrated by: Orson Welles (episodes 1–13)
- Original release: November 9, 1942 – April 30, 1944
- No. of series: 2
- No. of episodes: 78

Ceiling Unlimited (later known as America — Ceiling Unlimited) (1942–1944) is a CBS radio series created by Orson Welles and sponsored by the Lockheed-Vega Corporation. The program was conceived to glorify the aviation industry and dramatize its role in World War II.

"Welles wrote, produced, and narrated this show, and his work was considered a prime contribution to the war effort," wrote the Museum of Broadcasting.

At the end of Welles's 13-episode contract (November 9, 1942 – February 1, 1943), Ceiling Unlimited was hosted by a variety of personalities including Charles Boyer, Joe E. Brown, Ronald Colman, Marlene Dietrich, Cary Grant, Alan Ladd, William Powell, Basil Rathbone, Edward G. Robinson and writer James Hilton.

Ceiling Unlimited began as a 15-minute drama series broadcast Mondays at 7:15 p.m. ET. The program changed format for its second season, becoming a half-hour variety show hosted by Joseph Cotten. Retitled America — Ceiling Unlimited, the program featured vocalists Nan Wynn and Constance Moore, and music by Wilbur Hatch. The show aired Sundays at 2 p.m. ET beginning August 8, 1943, and ending April 30, 1944.

== Production ==
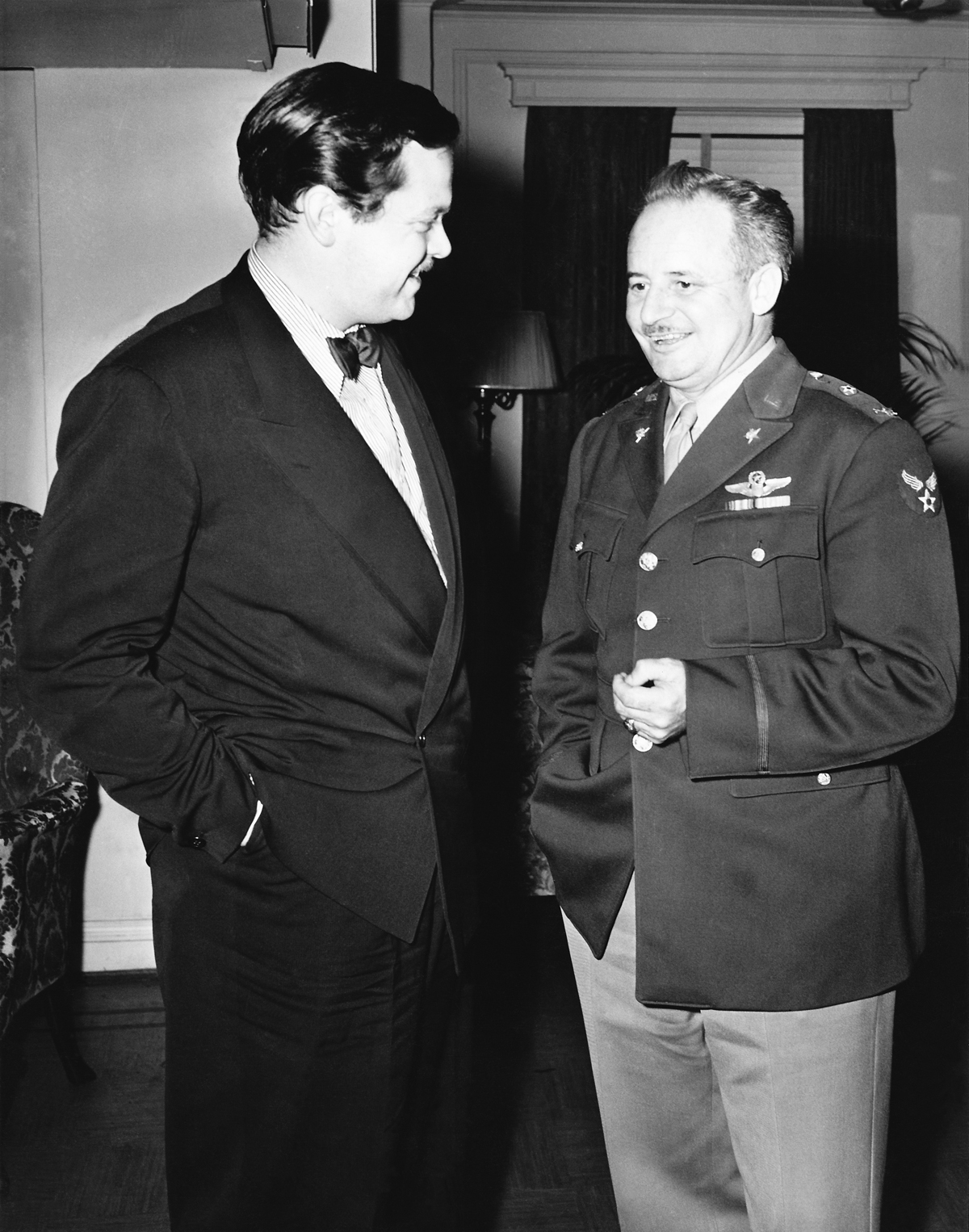
Orson Welles and Col. Arthur I. Ennis of the U.S. Department of War's Bureau of Public Relations discuss plans for the new radio series Ceiling Unlimited (October 26, 1942)

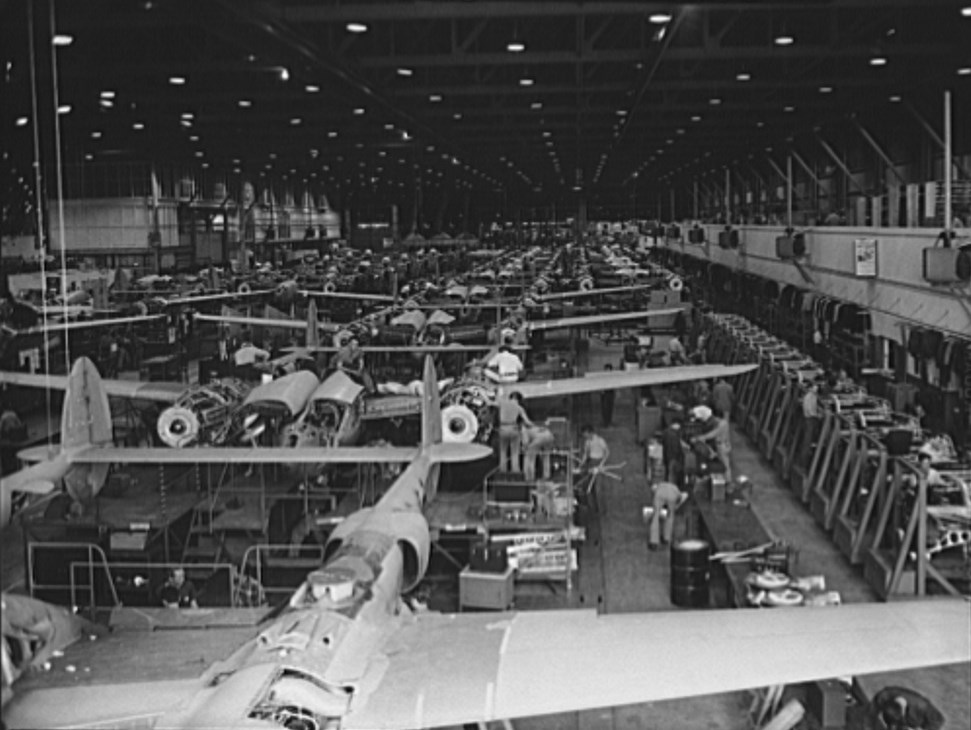
P-38 Lightning assembly line at the Lockheed aircraft plant, Burbank, California, c. 1942

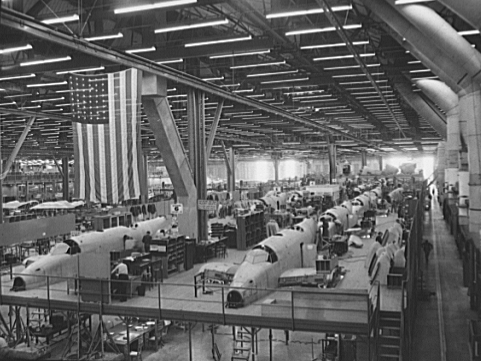
Production line at the Vega aircraft plant in Burbank, California, c. 1941

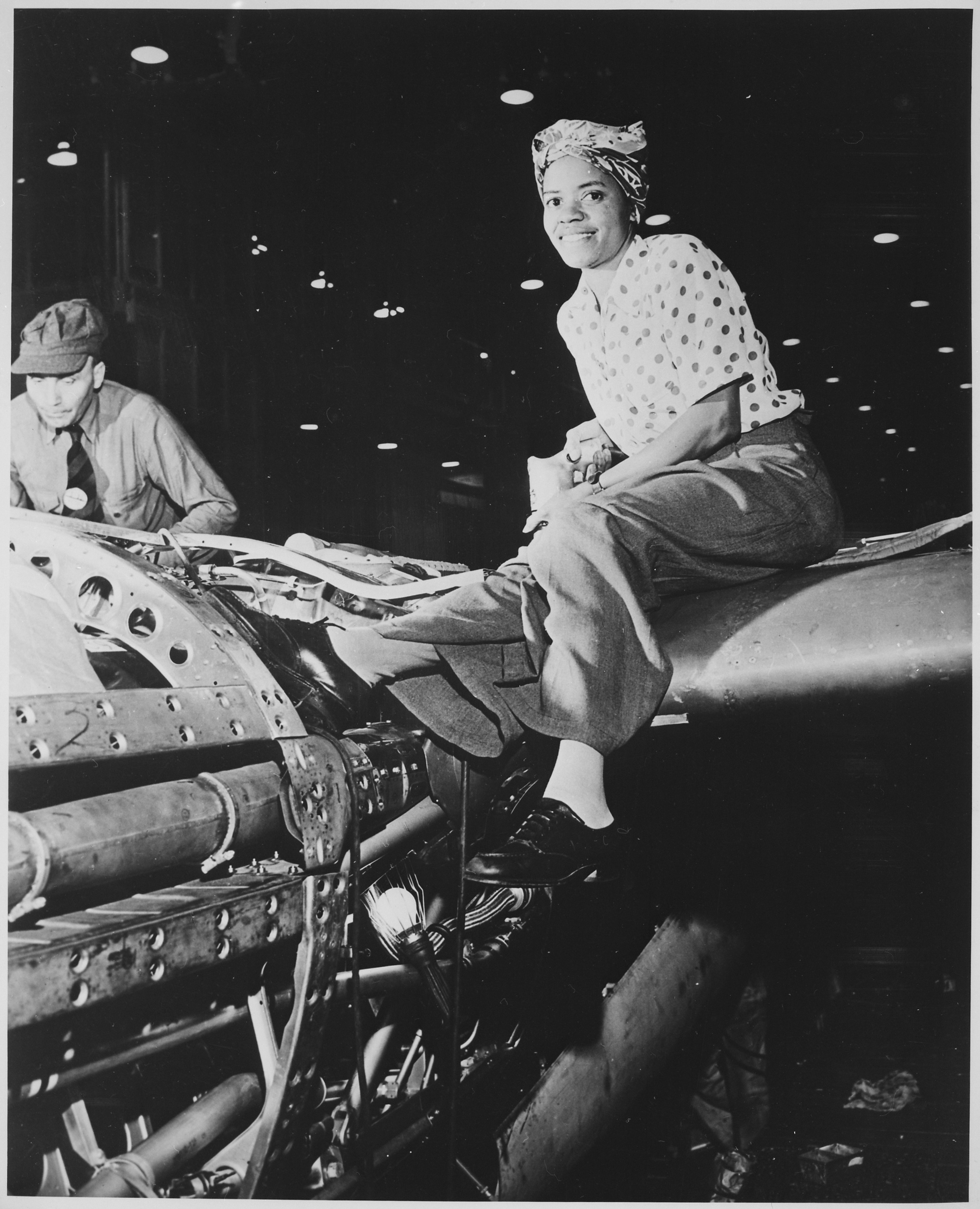
Riveter at the Lockheed aircraft plant in Burbank, California

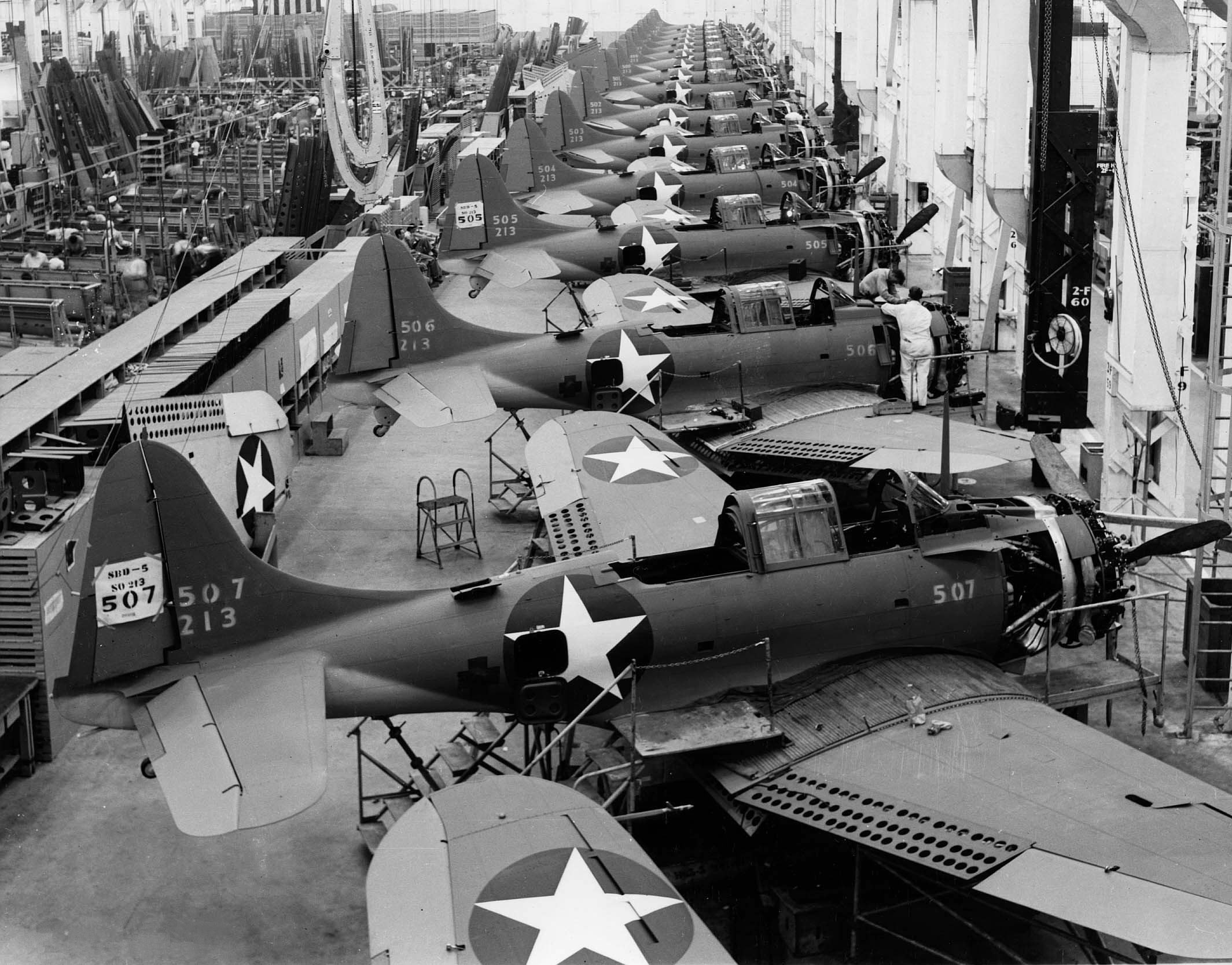
Douglas Dauntless production line at the Douglas aircraft plant in El Segundo, California, 1943

Orson Welles returned to the United States August 22, 1942, after six months of filming in Latin America at the behest of the Office of the Coordinator of Inter-American Affairs and serving as what Welles termed "a kind of Ambassador extraordinary." Within weeks he began to plan two CBS radio dramas to be broadcast on consecutive nights: Ceiling Unlimited, and Hello Americans, a docudrama to promote inter-American understanding and friendship during World War II.

Ceiling Unlimited was a morale-boosting anthology of stories about heroic tales of aviation. Described by radio historian John Dunning as "aggressively patriotic," the program was sponsored by the Lockheed-Vega Corporation. There were no commercial breaks; the company was content to have just three one-line mentions throughout each show. It was noted in the contemporary press that as Lockheed and Vega had only one lucrative customer — the wartime Allied governments — they did not need to advertise.

"Its purpose, one of simple propaganda, was to boost morale within the industry in order to underpin the vast increase in productivity the war demanded," wrote Welles biographer Simon Callow.

"Ceiling Unlimited accomplished news reportage, entertainment and education while its ever changing format kept the listener interested in the material presented," wrote biographer Bret Wood. "The purpose was not to strike fear into the hearts of Americans or to develop overconfidence, but to exemplify a confident, knowledgeable attitude of the war effort and to make the public aware of the sacrifices necessary to win the war."

Lockheed-Vega established a research bureau in Washington, D.C., to develop story ideas and identify true stories in the files of disparate government agencies. For his part, Welles acquainted himself with the Flying Fortress and other aircraft at the Lockheed-Vega plants in California, wrote biographer Frank Brady: "Sporting an employee's identification badge and wearing a silver-colored hard hat, he poked his nose into machinery, ate box lunches with executives, and talked to the workers on the assembly lines. He became enmeshed in the love of flight."

Welles titled the series Ceiling Unlimited. "He thought it both romantic and evocative," wrote biographer Frank Brady, "but the sponsors disagreed. For weeks, in publicity releases and other references the program was called 'the new Orson Welles Show,' and it wasn't until two days before the broadcast, when it appeared that Orson would not relent, that Ceiling Unlimited became official."

Playwright Arthur Miller was one of the writers for the show, and Welles asked him to create its format. Miller and Welles were the same age, 27; both were veterans of the Federal Theatre Project and they worked together easily. They had worked together once before; Welles performed a nuanced drama about Benito Juárez — Juarez: Thunder from the Hills, a verse play written by Miller — before a live audience on the September 28, 1942, broadcast of Cavalcade of America.

Ceiling Unlimited began November 9, 1942. Each week, announcer Pat McGeehan repeated, "Man has always looked to the heavens for help and inspiration, and from the skies too will come his victory and his future." Welles cast many of his Mercury Theatre company of actors, including Ray Collins, Joseph Cotten, Agnes Moorehead and Everett Sloane. Bernard Herrmann created the music for the first 13 shows.

Welles's run on the program overlapped with his other CBS radio series, Hello Americans, which was broadcast on Sunday nights while Ceiling Unlimited aired on Monday nights. His radio success was "a psychic exhilarant" for Welles, wrote biographer Frank Brady: "After the difficulties of It's All True and the discredit of Ambersons, compounded by the humiliation of being turned away by RKO, he began to regain his confidence with the positive radio reviews that appeared across the nation."

"Ceiling Unlimited demonstrated Welles's talent when taken to extremes," summarized biographer Bret Wood. "Fifteen minutes was hardly enough time to accomplish the different goals set forth, but he did his best to cover the spectrum of emotions and topics, sometimes to great effect but more often with campy results. The context in which the program was originally heard can never be recreated, so Ceiling Unlimited is impossible to objectively assess. Its sister program Hello Americans is less dated and for various reasons is superior to its less subdued counterpart."

Welles left Ceiling Unlimited at the end of his 13-episode contract, concluding the broadcast on February 1, 1943, with a statement: "For a while, the Mercury Theatre is going off the air. Next week my friend Ronald Colman will tell you the story about the Douglas Dauntless, the world's greatest dive bomber. We very much wish it were possible to go on writing and producing these radio plays. We've never been happier. … We leave with real regret."

Welles began filming on Jane Eyre, which he was producing and starring in, on February 3, 1943, while also beginning preparations for The Mercury Wonder Show, a 1943 magic-and-variety stage show for U.S. soldiers.

=== Guest hosts ===
Ronald Colman was the guest host on the February 8, 1943, edition of Ceiling Unlimited, the first to be broadcast after Welles's departure. Future shows of the season would continue to use celebrity guest hosts, including Marlene Dietrich, Alan Ladd, Brian Donlevy, Frank Morgan, Ralph Morgan, Basil Rathbone, Robert Young, Cary Grant, Claire Trevor, Edward G. Robinson, Adolphe Menjou, and Walter Abel.

From June 28 through August 2, 1943, Ceiling Unlimited was hosted by author James Hilton. Reviewing a July broadcast, Billboard wrote, "Hilton's ceiling is zero-zero ... Like many other ideas, James Hilton as a radio program sounded like a million dollars on paper and a thin dime on the air." Hilton published Ceiling Unlimited (1943), a boxed limited edition of 100 signed copies of his six scripts for the program.

=== Second season ===
The second season of the series began August 8, 1943 and followed more of a musical/variety format, with the series retitled America — Ceiling Unlimited. It was presented by Welles's friend and collaborator Joseph Cotten. It contained 39 episodes, the last of which was broadcast on April 30, 1944.

Such were the differences from the first season format that Old Time Radio enthusiast website The Digital Deli argues, "Any attempt to simply conflate Ceiling Unlimited and America, Ceiling Unlimited is just silly. They're entirely different formats … The only elements common to both programs were their sponsor and the phrase, Ceiling Unlimited".

=== John Steinbeck stories ===
As part of the January 25, 1943, episode of Ceiling Unlimited, Welles presented a John Steinbeck short story written specifically for broadcast. Titled "With Your Wings" (sometimes appearing as "Flyer Come Home with Your Wings") it relates the homecoming of a decorated pilot, later revealed to be black, and his realization of the meaning that his achievement has for his family and community. The script and recording are included with the Orson Welles materials at the Lilly Library. Welles presented the story once more, to conclude the final episode of his CBS radio series, The Orson Welles Almanac, broadcast July 19, 1944.

Virtually forgotten, the story was published in November 2014, after a transcript of the broadcast was found in the archives of the University of Texas at Austin by Andrew Gulli, managing editor of The Strand Magazine. "With Your Wings" appeared in the quarterly magazine's holiday issue. "To the best of my knowledge, and that of the Steinbeck estate, it's never been published before," Gulli wrote.

Another Steinbeck story, "Letter to Mother", was presented on Ceiling Unlimited January 18, 1943. The Lilly Library also holds this manuscript and recording with its Orson Welles materials.

In addition to working for the Writers' War Board, Steinbeck was one of the writers who contributed to the Voice of America, a service of the United States Office of War Information. John Houseman, Welles's erstwhile partner in the Mercury Theatre, was chief of radio programming for the Overseas Branch of the OWI and ran the Voice of America from February 1942 through June 1943.

== Episodes ==
The vast majority of episodes are believed to be missing, although they may still exist in private collections. Currently, six first-season episodes and four second-season episodes are in circulation among fans of Old Time Radio.

=== Ceiling Unlimited ===
Recordings of 12 of the 13 Ceiling Unlimited programs produced by Orson Welles are in the collection of the Lilly Library at Indiana University Bloomington. Missing from the collection is the broadcast of December 7, 1942, in which Welles reads Norman Rosten's poem, Back to Bataan; only the bound script is in the collection. A trial recording of the first program, "Flying Fortress", can be heard at the Old Time Radio Researchers Group Library. (Note: The trial recording of "Flying Fortress" is prefaced by the following statement: "— follows will not be broadcast in its present form. None of the material has received official clearance. This is a trial record only.")

"War Workers" is one of four of Welles's wartime radio broadcasts included as supplementary material in the Kino Classics restoration of The Stranger (1946), released on DVD and Blu-ray Disc in October 2013.

| # | Date | Program |
|---|---|---|
| 1 | November 9, 1942 | "Flying Fortress" by Ranald MacDougall and Norman Rosten; Cast: Orson Welles, Erskine Sanford, Ray Collins; music by Bernard Herrmann |
| 2 | November 16, 1942 | "Air Transport Command"; Cast: Orson Welles; music by Bernard Herrmann |
| 3 | November 23, 1942 | "The Navigator" by Orson Welles and Milton Geiger; Cast: Orson Welles, Joseph Cotten, Ray Collins, Agnes Moorehead, Elliott Reid; music by Bernard Herrmann; Promoting the third broadcast in the series Welles stated, "Everyone knows the skill and courage it takes to become a pilot, but few realize the concentration, knowledge, quick wit and steady nerves required of the navigator." |
| 4 | November 30, 1942 | "Wind, Sand and Stars" by Antoine de Saint-Exupéry, adapted by Orson Welles; Cast: Orson Welles, Burgess Meredith; music by Bernard Herrmann |
| 5 | December 7, 1942 | "Ballad of Bataan" by Norman Rosten; Cast: Orson Welles; music by Bernard Herrmann |
| 6 | December 14, 1942 | "War Workers" by Hans Conried; Cast: Orson Welles; music by Bernard Herrmann; Welles "interviews" members of the diverse workforce at the Vega airplane factory |
| 7 | December 21, 1942 | "Gremlins" by Lucille Fletcher; Cast: Orson Welles, Joseph Cotten, Agnes Moorehead, Lou Merrill; music by Bernard Herrmann; Christmas episode |
| 8 | December 28, 1942 | "Pan American Airlines" by Milton Geiger; Cast: Orson Welles; music by Bernard Herrmann |
| 9 | January 4, 1943 | "Anti-Submarine Patrol"; Cast: Edward G. Robinson substituting for Orson Welles; (Note: At the last-minute rehearsal before the January 4 broadcast, Welles clashed with a newly appointed advertising agency account executive and walked off the set.) (Note: Welles had missed the previous day's broadcast of Hello Americans due to illness.) music by Bernard Herrmann |
| 10 | January 11, 1943 | "Finger in the Wind" by Myron Dutton; Cast: Orson Welles; music by Bernard Herrmann |
| 11 | January 18, 1943 | "Letter to Mother" by John Steinbeck; Cast: Betty Garde (Mother), Orson Welles; music by Bernard Herrmann |
| 12 | January 25, 1943 | "Mrs. James and the Pot of Tea" by John Tucker Battle; John Steinbeck's "With Your Wings", which Welles calls "one of the best things we've had the chance to do on the air" Cast: Orson Welles, Agnes Moorehead; music by Bernard Herrmann |
| 13 | February 1, 1943 | "The Future"; Cast: Orson Welles (final show in his 13-episode contract); music by Bernard Herrmann; Set three years in the future at La Guardia Airport |
| 14 | February 8, 1943 | "Dive Bomber"; Cast: Ronald Colman |
| 15 | February 15, 1943 | Drama about a German mother whose son is fighting for Hitler; Cast: Marlene Dietrich, Maria Riva |
| 16 | February 22, 1943 | "Arctic Rescue"; Cast: Alan Ladd |
| 17 | March 1, 1943 | "Flight Surgeon"; Cast: Ralph Morgan, Frank Morgan |
| 18 | March 8, 1943 | Cast: James Gleason, Pat O'Malley |
| 19 | March 15, 1943 | "Air Transport Command"; Cast: Agnes Moorehead |
| 20 | March 22, 1943 | "Alberto Santos-Dumont"; Cast: Charles Boyer |
| 21 | March 29, 1943 | "Mr. Split-Second"; Cast: Basil Rathbone |
| 22 | April 5, 1943 | |
| 23 | April 12, 1943 | |
| 24 | April 19, 1943 | "God's Corporals" and "Hymn to a Hero"; Cast: William Powell (Note: "William Powell of the movies is spokesman on God's Corporals, the Ceiling Unlimited story dramatizing the giant planes which carry wounded men from battlefields to base hospitals … The nurses are trained in aerial gunnery so they can take part in actual combat in case of attack. These intrepid young women are capable, in extreme emergency, of performing operations.") and Agnes Moorehead |
| 25 | April 26, 1943 | "Big Town, 1955 A.D."; Cast: Edward G. Robinson, Ona Munson |
| 26 | May 3, 1943 | Cast: Walter Abel, Claire Trevor |
| 27 | May 10, 1943 | "Rulers of Earth" aka "Dictators Meeting in Hell"; Cast: Orson Welles (The Devil), George Coulouris (Napoleon), Pedro de Cordoba (Philip), Joe Kearns (Louis) Lou Merrill, Hans Conried (The Kaiser); music composed and conducted by Anthony Collins |
| 28 | May 17, 1943 | "I Saw War"; Cast: Joe E. Brown |
| 29 | May 24, 1943 | "Island in the Sky"; Cast: Cary Grant |
| 30 | May 31, 1943 | |
| 31 | June 7, 1943 | |
| 32 | June 14, 1943 | "First Mission"; Cast: Joseph Cotten |
| 33 | June 21, 1943 | Cast: Robert Young |
| 34 | June 28, 1943 | "Radar, the Secret Weapon'"; Cast: James Hilton |
| 35 | July 5, 1943 | Cast: James Hilton |
| 36 | July 12, 1943 | Cast: James Hilton |
| 37 | July 19, 1943 | Cast: James Hilton |
| 38 | July 26, 1943 | Cast: James Hilton |
| 39 | August 2, 1943 | Cast: James Hilton |

=== America — Ceiling Unlimited ===
Beginning Sunday, August 8, 1943, Joseph Cotten hosted the 30-minute variety series still sponsored by Lockheed and Vega but now titled America — Ceiling Unlimited. In his 1987 autobiography, Cotten recalled that at the end of the first broadcast he was summoned to the control booth for a telephone call: "It was Groucho Marx. He congratulated me and said that he had not only enjoyed the show, but had also been completely sold by the commercial. 'Just where can I buy a P-38?' he asked."

| # | Date | Program |
|---|---|---|
| 1 | August 8, 1943 | Cast: Joseph Cotten, Nan Wynn |
| 2 | August 15, 1943 | Cast: Joseph Cotten |
| 3 | August 22, 1943 | Cast: Joseph Cotten |
| 4 | August 29, 1943 | Cast: Joseph Cotten |
| 5 | September 5, 1943 | "A Smart Soldier Like Me"; Cast: Joseph Cotten |
| 6 | September 12, 1943 | Cast: Joseph Cotten |
| 7 | September 19, 1943 | Cast: Joseph Cotten |
| 8 | September 26, 1943 | "Johnny Flynn and the Scourge of the Desert"; Cast: Joseph Cotten |
| 9 | October 3, 1943 | Cast: Joseph Cotten, Ben Lyon |
| 10 | October 10, 1943 | Cast: Joseph Cotten |
| 11 | October 17, 1943 | Cast: Joseph Cotten |
| 12 | October 24, 1943 | Cast: Joseph Cotten |
| 13 | October 31, 1943 | Cast: Joseph Cotten |
| 14 | November 7, 1943 | Cast: Joseph Cotten |
| 15 | November 14, 1943 | Cast: Joseph Cotten, Constance Moore |
| 16 | November 21, 1943 | Cast: Joseph Cotten, Constance Moore |
| 17 | November 28, 1943 | Cast: Joseph Cotten |
| 18 | December 5, 1943 | Cast: Joseph Cotten |
| 19 | December 12, 1943 | Cast: Joseph Cotten |
| 20 | December 19, 1943 | "A Letter to an Unborn Son"; Cast: Joseph Cotten, Constance Moore; music by Wilbur Hatch; With Agnes Moorehead, Pedro de Cordoba, Hans Conried, Lou Merrill |
| 21 | December 26, 1943 | "Flight Report"; Cast: Joseph Cotten, Constance Moore |
| 22 | January 2, 1944 | "Custody of the Cook"; Cast: Joseph Cotten |
| 23 | January 9, 1944 | "Cajun Cradle"; Cast: Joseph Cotten |
| 24 | January 16, 1944 | "The Little People" by Frank Richardson Pierce; Cast: Joseph Cotten |
| 25 | January 23, 1944 | "Girl Adrift" by Richard Howels Watkins; Cast: Joseph Cotten |
| 26 | January 30, 1944 | Cast: Joseph Cotten |
| 27 | February 6, 1944 | Cast: Joseph Cotten |
| 28 | February 13, 1944 | "Remember This Day"; Cast: Joseph Cotten, Constance Moore |
| 29 | February 20, 1944 | "Those Who Were On the Ferry"; Cast: Joseph Cotten, Constance Moore |
| 30 | February 27, 1944 | "Comes the Devil"; Cast: Joseph Cotten, Constance Moore |
| 31 | March 5, 1944 | "Situation Well in Hand" by Vina Delmar; Cast: Joseph Cotten, Constance Moore |
| 32 | March 12, 1944 | Cast: Joseph Cotten, Constance Moore; music by Wilbur Hatch |
| 33 | March 19, 1944 | Cast: Joseph Cotten |
| 34 | March 26, 1944 | "The Bride and Delehanty"; Cast: Joseph Cotten |
| 35 | April 2, 1944 | "George is a Noble Guy" by George F. Jenkins; Cast: Joseph Cotten, Constance Moore |
| 36 | April 9, 1944 | "Hymn to a Hero" and "God's Corporals"; Cast: Joseph Cotten, Constance Moore; music by Wilbur Hatch; With Agnes Moorehead |
| 37 | April 16, 1944 | "A Date in Bethesda"; Cast: Joseph Cotten, Constance Moore |
| 38 | April 23, 1944 | Cast: Joseph Cotten |
| 39 | April 30, 1944 | Cast: Joseph Cotten |
