= The Mercury Wonder Show =

1943 American play

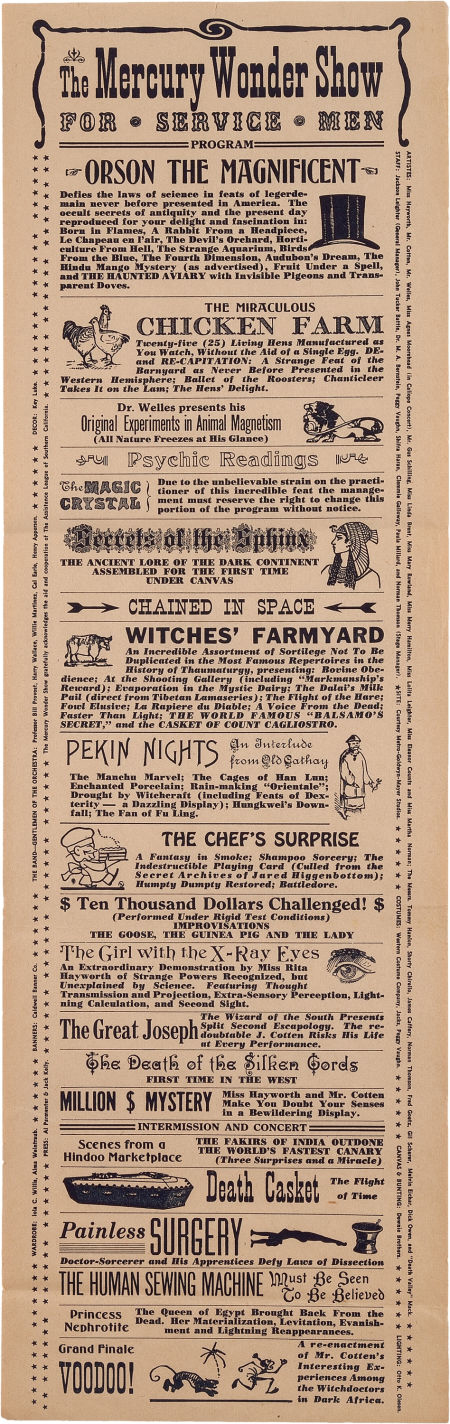
Advertising herald for The Mercury Wonder Show (August 1943)

The Mercury Wonder Show for Service Men was a 1943 magic-and-variety stage show by the Mercury Theatre, produced by Orson Welles and Joseph Cotten as a morale-boosting entertainment for US soldiers in World War II. Directed by Welles, the show starred Welles ("Orson the Magnificent"), Cotten ("Jo-Jo the Great"), Agnes Moorehead ("Calliope Aggie") and Rita Hayworth, whose part was later filled by Marlene Dietrich. Jean Gabin also worked on the show backstage, as a propman. The show ran to 150 minutes.

== Background ==
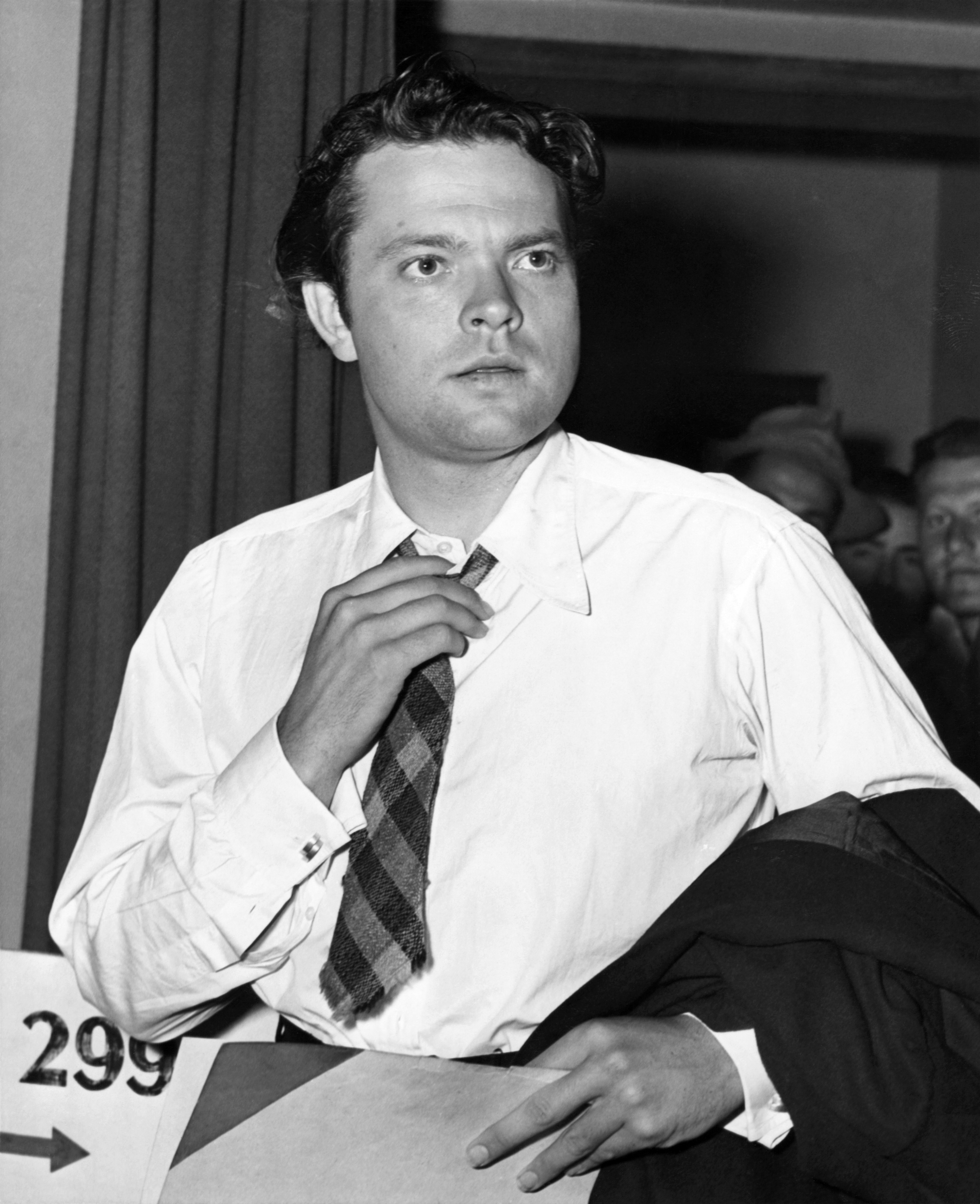
Orson Welles leaving his Army physical examination after being judged unfit for military service (May 6, 1943)

In early 1943, the two concurrent radio series (Ceiling Unlimited, Hello Americans) that Orson Welles created for CBS to support the war effort had ended. Filming also had wrapped on Jane Eyre, which he received $100,000 to appear in and associate-produce — the same amount he had received for his multiple responsibilities on Citizen Kane --- and that fee, in addition to the income from his regular guest-star roles in radio, would allow Welles to fulfill a lifelong dream. He approached the War Assistance League of Southern California and proposed a show that evolved into a big-top spectacle, part circus and part magic show. He offered his services as magician and director, and invested some $40,000 of his own money in an extravaganza he called The Mercury Wonder Show for Service Men. Members of the U.S. armed forces were admitted free of charge, while the general public had to pay. The show entertained more than 1,000 service members each night, and proceeds went to the War Assistance League, a charity for military service personnel.

"It was just like a circus — I would have adored it if I'd been a member of the audience, I know that," Welles later told filmmaker Peter Bogdanovich.

The development of the show coincided with the resolution of Welles's draft status in May 1943, when he was finally declared 4-F — unfit for military service — for a variety of medical reasons. "I felt guilty about the war," Welles told biographer Barbara Leaming. "I was guilt-ridden about my civilian status." He had been publicly hounded about his patriotism since Citizen Kane, when the Hearst press began persistent inquiries about why Welles had not been drafted.

Welles's fascination with illusion dated back to childhood; Harry Houdini gave him his first lessons in magic. His 1941 debut at the California State Fair (assisted by Dolores del Río) was a hit and, as "The Ace", he continued practicing his performance skills at vaudeville theaters and army camps. By 1943 Welles had developed a two-hour magic show.

== Rehearsal and previews ==
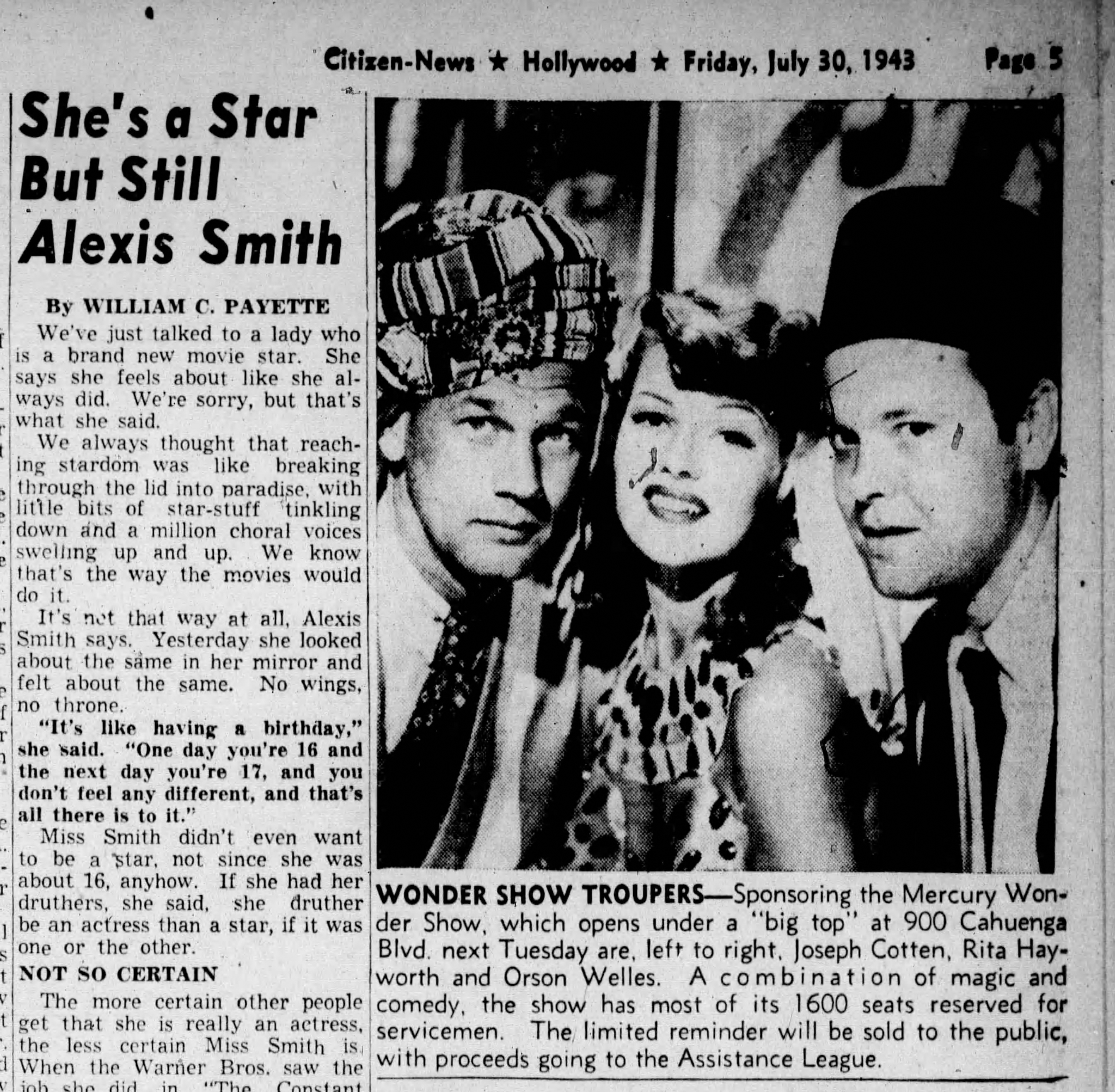
Joseph Cotten, Rita Hayworth and Orson Welles in a publicity photo for The Mercury Wonder Show

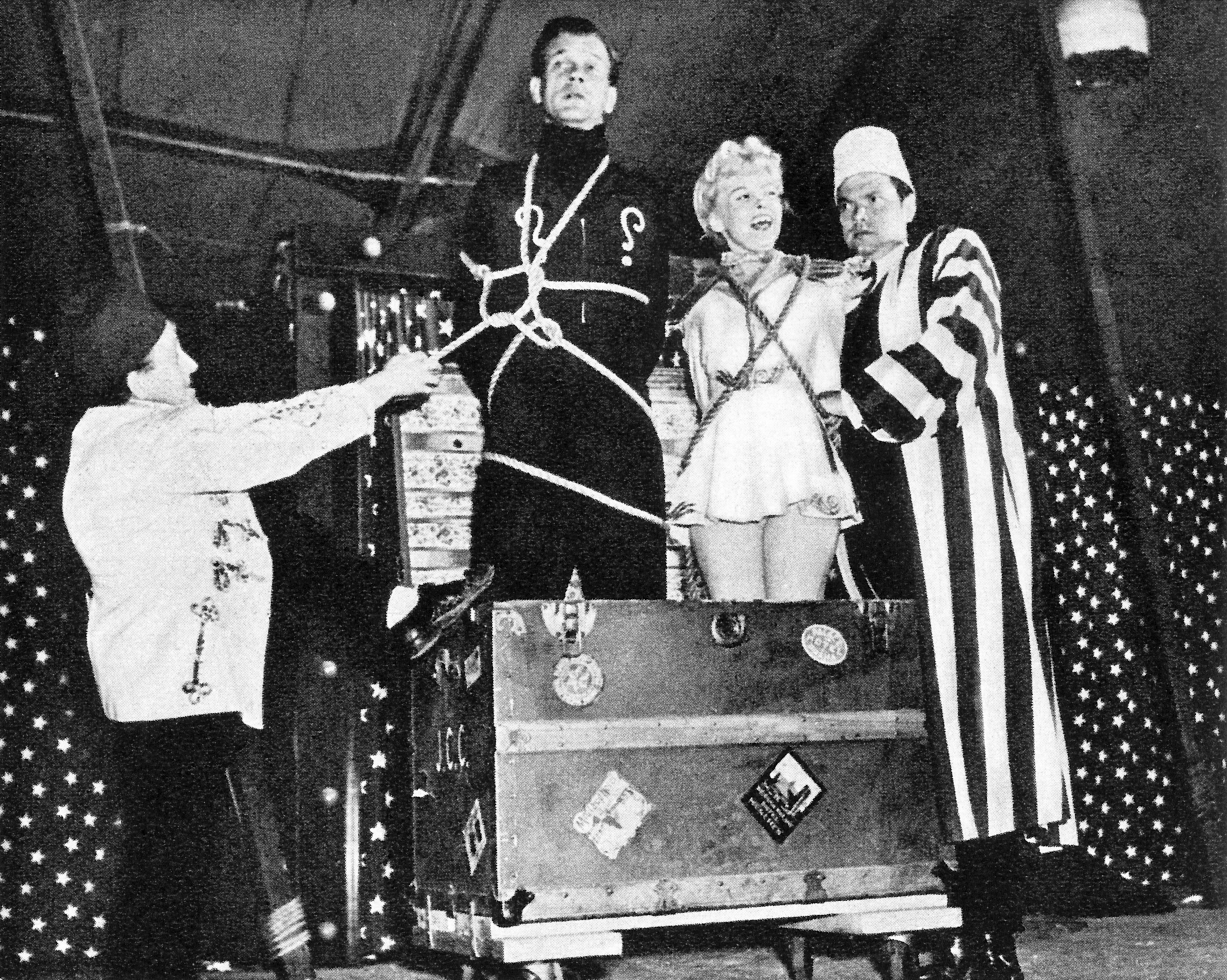
George (Shorty) Chirello, Joseph Cotten, Eleanor Counts and Orson Welles

The show's name was a nod to Howard Thurston's The Wonder Show of the Universe. Welles adapted at least five of Thurston's illusions for his own show, and adopted his use of showgirls as stage extras. For The Mercury Wonder Show, Welles selected Rita Hayworth, one of the most popular women in motion pictures, as his chief assistant. In April 1943 he began teaching illusions to Hayworth, who was then living with him. The couple practiced the Houdini Substitution Trunk routine in the 125-seat private theater of Bill Larsen, a successful Los Angeles attorney and magician who operated Thayer's Studio of Magic.

Other cast included co-producer Joseph Cotten and, in his stage debut as comedy assistant, Welles's chauffeur, George (Shorty) Chirello. Welles hired Keye Luke — an accomplished visual artist as well as an actor — to design culturally authentic scenery and graphics, in contrast to the fake-Oriental visuals typically seen in Western magic shows.

The show was rehearsed for 17 weeks. Welles leased the Playtime Theatre (later the Las Palmas Theatre), a 350-seat house in Hollywood. Welles initially planned a moderate-sized magic show, open only to service members, that would run six weeks at the theatre and then tour army camps. Welles and the cast rehearsed from 7 p.m. until 2 or 3 a.m.; back home, Welles would spend the rest of the night improving the magic act and working out new bits of business. He tested 18 different openings before he was satisfied.

Previews began in June. As the show came together Welles began calling it "the biggest magic show on earth", and the cast and crew grew to 31 people. Welles bought or commissioned $26,000 worth of props and put $14,000 into the tent, scenery, costumes and rental of circus equipment. He also rented an entire menagerie, from a canary to a lion. Metro-Goldwyn-Mayer donated the venue, a lot near the Hollywood Canteen on Cahuenga Boulevard.

== Production ==
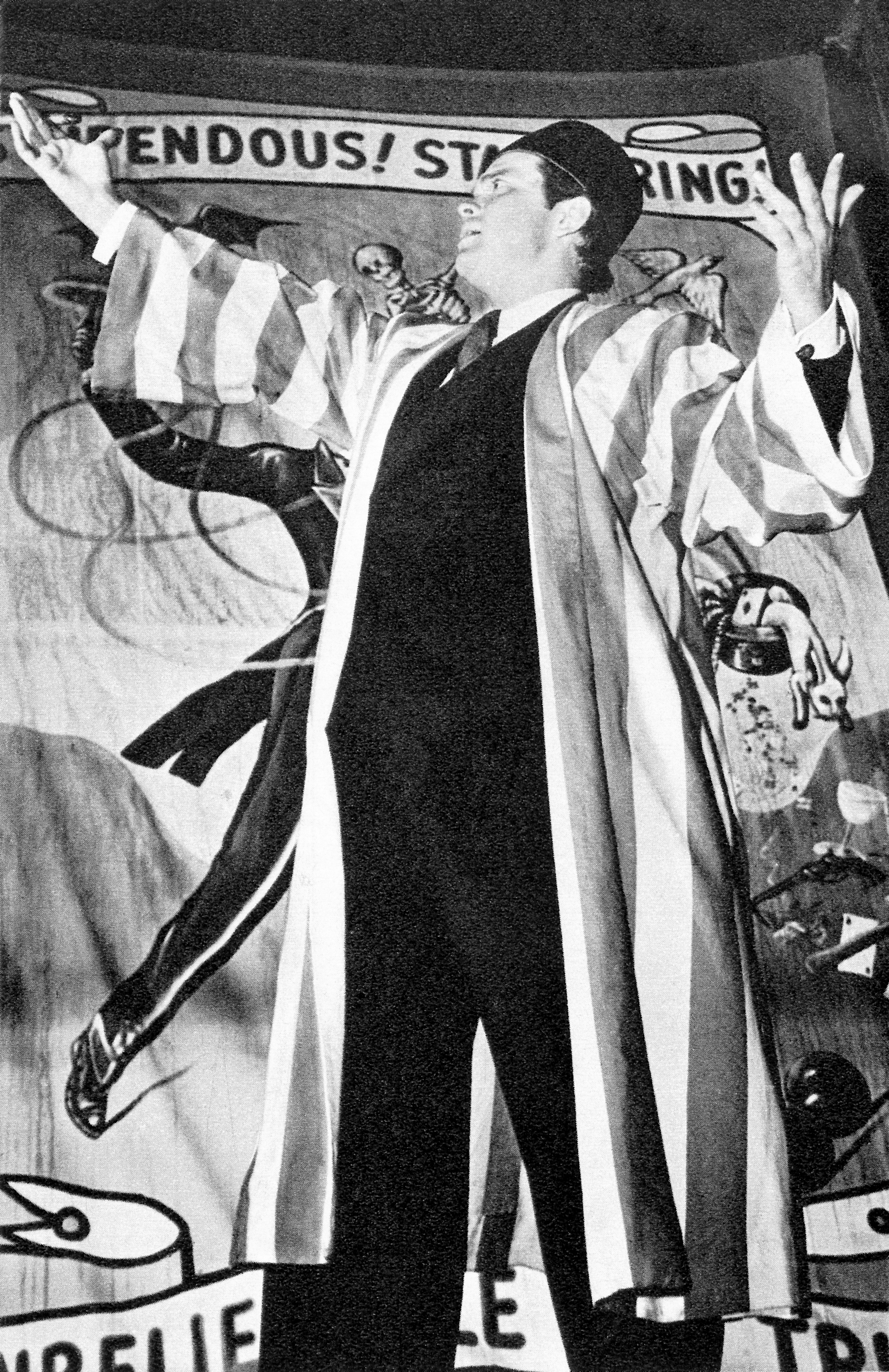
"Hello, suckers!" Orson the Magnificent welcomes the audience to The Mercury Wonder Show

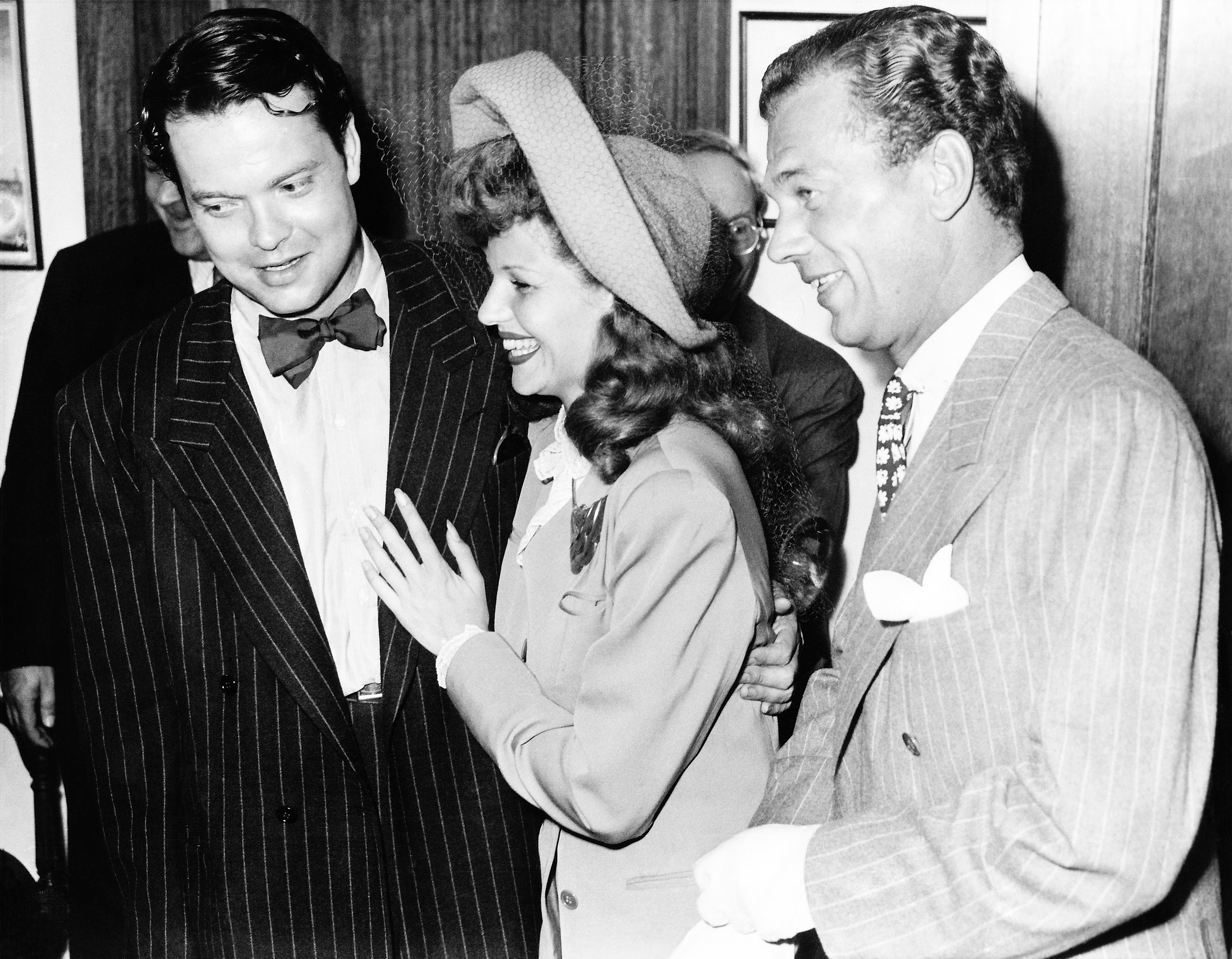
Wedding of Orson Welles and Rita Hayworth, with best man Joseph Cotten (September 7, 1943)

Last year Mr. Welles went to work for Lockheed — building airplanes by acting, producing and a directing a radio show. With this stint of vocal welding and literate riveting behind him he was ripe for a magic show of his own, to be full of sound and fury, corn and canaries. The night of Aug. 3 saw that show light up the Los Angeles dimout.

— The New York Times Magazine, August 29, 1943

The Mercury Wonder Show ran August 3 – September 9, 1943, in an 80-by-120-foot tent located at 9000 Cahuenga Boulevard, in the heart of Hollywood. The brand-new, two-pole Big Top offered 1,100 bleacher seats — all of them free — to service members. In the center were 400 folding chairs for the public, with tickets priced at $1.65 to $5.50 for adults and 55 cents for children. For opening night only, the public seats were $5.50 and $11. Charity-minded Hollywood celebrities could pay $30 (the equivalent of $558 today) for one of the 25 to 30 seats in the sucker section; it cost $50 or $100 for one of the two super-sucker seats nailed down directly behind the massive tent poles. Welles recalled subjecting this highest-paying public — "usually Sam Goldwyn or Jack Warner or somebody like that" — to humiliations that included having eggs broken over their heads. "And they had to pretend it was all good fun, because our boys in khaki were there, you know. We really gave it to them."

After performing in the official premiere August 3, Rita Hayworth was thereafter forbidden to appear in The Mercury Wonder Show by Columbia boss Harry Cohn. When her lawyer confirmed that Hayworth could indeed be sued for breach of contract — filming was then under way for Cover Girl — Welles persuaded her not to jeopardize her entire career by going on anyway, as she vowed to do. He phoned his friend Marlene Dietrich and asked her to fill in. "Come teach me the tricks and I do it," Dietrich replied. "She was the good soldier of all time," Welles said.

At intermission September 7, 1943, KMPC radio interviewed audience and cast members of The Mercury Wonder Show — including Welles and Hayworth, who were married earlier that day. Welles remarked that The Mercury Wonder Show had been performed for approximately 48,000 members of the U.S. armed forces.

Looking back on the experience 30 years later, Welles said the show was primarily made "for fun", but that "it's one of our great works" and that the Mercury Theatre were "as proud of that as anything we ever did."

A reduced version toured army bases around the U.S. Several episodes of the 1944 CBS Radio show The Orson Welles Almanac that were performed live before audiences of servicemen were also called the Mercury Wonder Show.

== Cultural references ==
=== "The Trunk Murder" ===
Welles wrote, directed and performed in a plug for The Mercury Wonder Show that ran in Look magazine November 16, 1943. In "The Trunk Murder", the magician solves the double murder of Joseph Cotten and showgirl assistant Eleanor Counts. George (Shorty) Chirello, Death Valley Mack, Merry Hamilton and Tommy Hanlon Jr. appear in the five-photo crime puzzle. "Don't be embarrassed if you can't work it," readers are advised, "since [Welles] admits he has never yet solved a LOOK Photocrime."

=== Follow the Boys ===
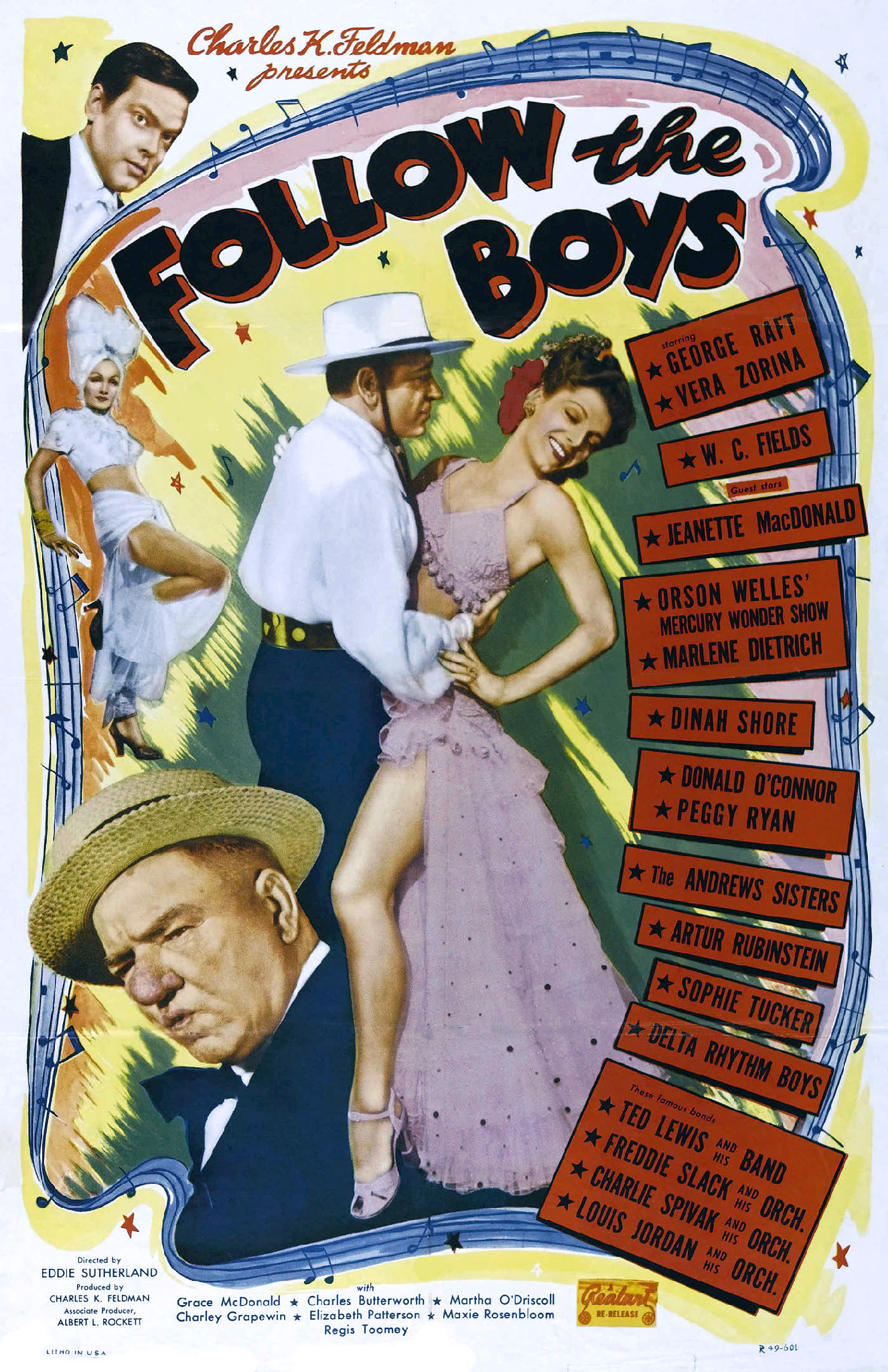
Poster for Follow the Boys (1944)

A portion of the stage show was filmed and included in the 1944 variety film, Follow the Boys. The film segment was directed by Welles, uncredited.

Welles and Dietrich agreed to appear in the film while The Mercury Wonder Show was still running. The seven-minute segment was shot on the Universal lot in late September 1943. Welles traded his robe and fez for white tie and tails, and brought along a crew from the show — Shorty Chirello, Tommy Hanlon Jr., Professor Bill and his Circus Symphony, Death Valley Mack, two female assistants and eight chorus girls. Welles performed a few illusions; his own appearance on stage and the comic version of the sawing-a-woman-in-half illusion featuring Dietrich were achieved with trick photography. Welles received $30,000 for his part in the film. The segment was to be shot in four or five days, but Welles stretched filming to 16 days to give additional pay to his crew.

=== Memorabilia ===
A framed copy of the playbill for The Mercury Wonder Show was sold at auction October 31, 2002, for $1,610. In an auction April 26, 2014, the advertising herald was sold for $1,062.50; the item was among those found in boxes and trunks of Welles's personal possessions by his daughter Beatrice Welles.

A scrapbook kept by George (Shorty) Chirello was offered as part of the "TCM Presents … There's No Place Like Hollywood" auction November 24, 2014, at Bonhams in New York. Chirello worked for Welles from about 1942 to 1952; his scrapbook begins in August 1943 with clippings about The Mercury Wonder Show, and includes a copy of the playbill. Chirello managed props for the show, and acted as Welles's comedy assistant on stage and in the film Follow the Boys. The scrapbook and a directors chair inscribed "Orson Welles" were sold as a single lot and brought $13,750 at auction.
