= Mr. Johnson (disambiguation) =

Mr. Johnson (born 1966) is a Nigerian musician.

Mr. Johnson may also refer to:

- Mr. Johnson, a character on Abbott Elementary
- Mr. Johnson (Sesame Street), a character on Sesame Street

== See also ==
- Mister Johnson (disambiguation)
- List of people with surname Johnson
