= Hello Americans =

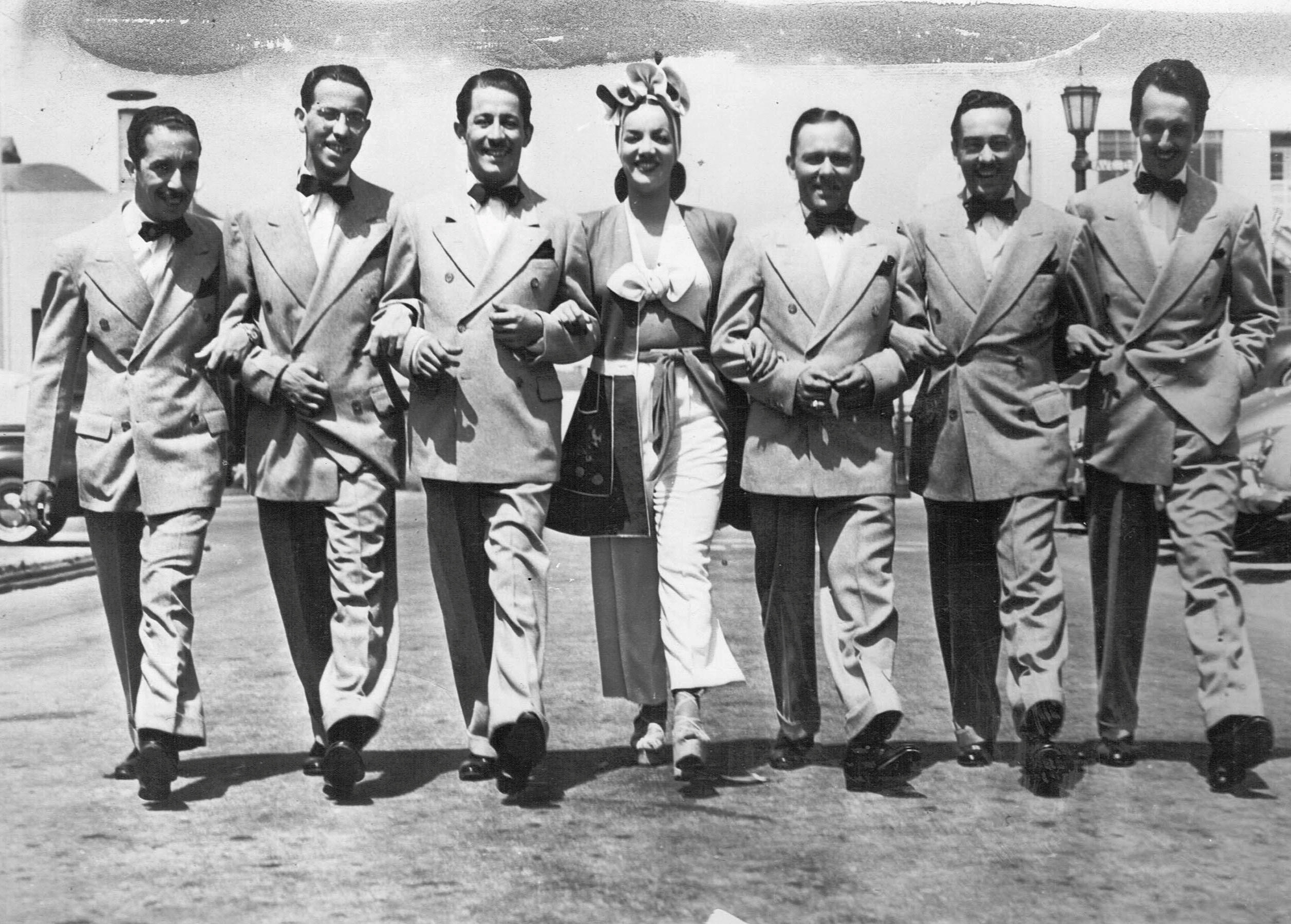
- Carmen Miranda and Bando da Lua opened the debut episode of Hello Americans — "Brazil" (November 15, 1942)
- Genre: Docudrama
- Running time: 30 minutes
- Country of origin: United States
- Language(s): English
- Home station: CBS
- Hosted by: Orson Welles
- Starring: Orson Welles; Mercury Players
- Written by: Orson Welles; John Tucker Battle; Robert Meltzer; Richard Brooks; Milton Geiger others
- Directed by: Orson Welles
- Produced by: Orson Welles
- Original release: November 15, 1942 – January 31, 1943
- No. of series: 1
- No. of episodes: 12

Hello Americans (1942–43) is a CBS Radio series produced, directed and hosted by Orson Welles. Created to promote inter-American understanding and friendship during World War II, the series aired Sundays at 8 p.m. ET beginning November 15, 1942. Its last broadcast was January 31, 1943. Sponsored by the Office of the Coordinator of Inter-American Affairs, the drama series featured many of the actors from Welles's Mercury Theatre repertory ensemble.

Hello Americans was produced concurrently with Welles's other CBS series, Ceiling Unlimited, a salute to the aviation industry, and his work was considered a significant contribution to the war effort.

== History ==
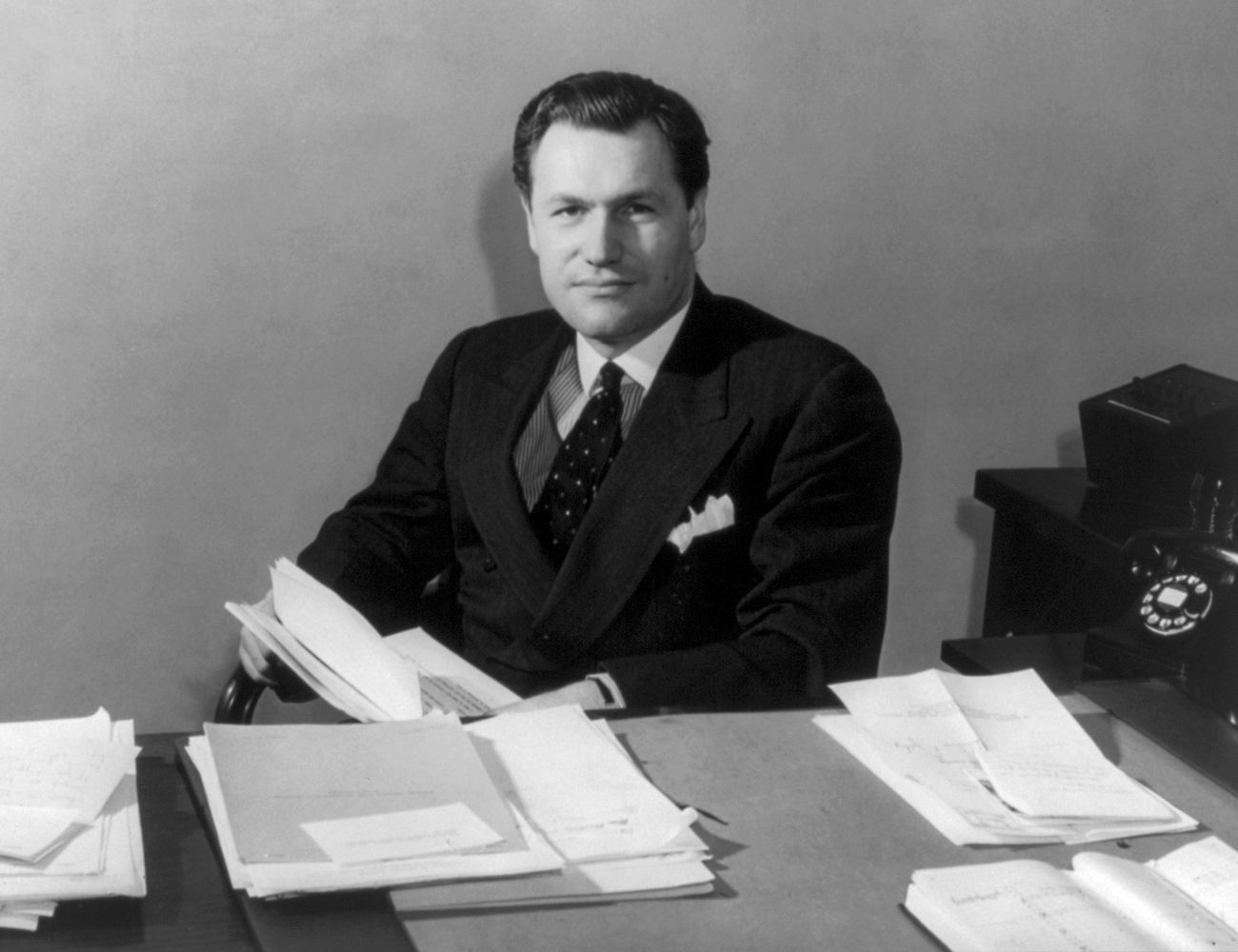
Nelson Rockefeller, Coordinator of Inter-American Affairs and a principal stockholder in RKO Pictures (1940)

Orson Welles produced Hello Americans under the auspices of the Office of the Coordinator of Inter-American Affairs, created by President Franklin D. Roosevelt in July 1941 "to provide for the development of commercial and cultural relations between the American Republics and thereby increasing the solidarity of this hemisphere and furthering the spirit of cooperation between the Americas in the interest of hemisphere defense."

"The best good-will propaganda is to sell South America to North America," Welles wrote coordinator Nelson Rockefeller. Welles drew upon the research amassed earlier in 1942 for It's All True, the film project he had embarked upon also at the request of Rockefeller, who was a major RKO Pictures stockholder and Welles admirer as well as Coordinator of Inter-American Affairs. It was hoped that the dramatizations would counteract German and Italian propaganda and build solidarity among American republics in the hemisphere.

"It belongs to a period when hemispheric unity was a crucial matter and many programs were being devoted to the common heritage of the Americas," broadcasting historian Erik Barnouw wrote of a contemporaneous project Welles created — a radio play called Admiral of the Ocean Sea, broadcast on Cavalcade of America October 12, 1942:

Many such programs were being translated into Spanish and Portuguese and broadcast to Latin America, to counteract many years of successful Axis propaganda to that area. The Axis, trying to stir Latin America against Anglo-America, had constantly emphasized the differences between the two. It became the job of American radio to emphasize their common experience and essential unity.

An entertaining and factual look at the legend of Christopher Columbus, Admiral of the Ocean Sea (also known as Columbus Day) begins with the words, "Hello Americans" — the title Welles would choose for his own series five weeks later.

"The pan-American cause, with its inclusiveness, its celebration of diversity and its challenge to the values of white Anglo-Saxon Protestantism, was something to which Welles felt deeply attracted," explained biographer Simon Callow. "Welles constantly sought the most vivacious method of presentation … interviewing the great dead as if they were alive, evoking the country in question in sounds and atmospheres, dramatising the historical while never forgetting the present reality: conquistadores rub shoulders with civil engineers.

"They were good shows, I thought," Welles told filmmaker Peter Bogdanovich:

All inter-American affairs. I did the A-B-Cs of the Caribbean. And they were very amusing. I didn't really do much of it — the writers were awfully good. And it was a good form. A-B-C: "A" is for "Antilles," "Antigua," and so on. We went through like that and did little things and big things, with music and stories each week. I'm queer for the Caribbean anyway — not as it exists, but as it was in my mind in the 18th and 19th centuries. The Caribbean is just great stuff. All of it. The whole idea of all these empires fighting over tiny little islands, and black independence and Spanish pride and the War of Jenkins' Ear and those great earthquakes.

The series finished at the end of January 1943, when its sponsor concluded that the program failed to attract a sufficient audience.

== Episodes ==
The episodes of Hello Americans are described in an annotated chronology of Welles's career created by Jonathan Rosenbaum for the 1992 book, This is Orson Welles.

#	Date	Title	Program
1	November 15, 1942	"Brazil"	The story of samba, including lessons on technique and instrumentation Discussion of Brazil's unique ethnic mix, products and natural resources, and the importance of conserving the Amazon jungle Welles joins Carmen Miranda in singing Ary Barroso's samba, "No Tabuleiro da Baiana"; Script by Robert Meltzer, music by Lucien Moraweck; Cast: Orson Welles, Carmen Miranda, Lud Gluskin and His Orchestra "Broadcasting from Brazil … by dramatic license"
2	November 22, 1942	"The Andes"	Two music compositions by Justin Elie and Antônio Carlos Gomes; Poetry by Norman Rosten; Cast: Edmond O'Brien (Bolivar), Agnes Moorehead, Ray Collins, Elliott Reid, Barbara Jean Wong, Hans Conried, others
3	November 29, 1942	"The Islands"	The abolition of slavery in Haiti led by Toussaint Louverture and the reign of Henri Christophe; Cast: Ray Collins, Hans Conried, Elliott Reid, the Haitian Chorus
4	December 6, 1942	"The Alphabet: A to C"	In part about the Mexican revolutionary Bolivar, referring back to Christophe the early 19th-century Haitian King; Guest singer: Miguelito Valdés
5	December 13, 1942	"The Alphabet: C to S"	
6	December 20, 1942	"The Alphabet: Slavery (Abednego) to End of Alphabet"	Written by Orson Welles and John Tucker Battle; Cast: Orson Welles (Sir Barnaby Finch), Elliott Reid (Abednego), Norman Field (Toussaint Louverture), Gerald Mohr (Henri Christophe)
7	December 27, 1942	"The Bad-Will Ambassador"	Written by Richard Brooks; Cast: Norman Field, Pedro de Cordoba, John Tucker Battle, Hans Conried, Martin Stone, Orson Welles
8	January 3, 1943	"Ritmos de las Americas"	Music for the people of two continents (Orson Welles unable to appear due to illness); Cast: Tito Guízar (host), Dick Joy (announcer), Miguelito Valdés, Sir Lancelot, Lud Gluskin and his Orchestra
9	January 10, 1943	"Mexico"	Stories of Montezuma and Benito Juárez
10	January 17, 1943	"Feed the World"	Written by Milton Geiger; Cast: Frank Readick (narrator), Eddie Jerome (Gaucho), Orson Welles (Famine), Carl Swenson, Joseph Cheshire (Cotten), Jack Moss, Louis Solomon
11	January 24, 1943	"Ritmos de las Americas"	Rhythms of the Americas (Orson Welles unable to appear due to illness); Cast: Truman Bradley (host), Diana Gayle, Miguelito Valdés, Carlos Ramírez, Lud Gluskin and His Orchestra
12	January 31, 1943	"Bolivar's Idea"	Inter-American democracy and why it is essential in the war Incorporates excerpts of Milton Geiger's poem to human civilization, "I Will Not Go Back" (later the centerpiece of the April 1945 broadcast of This Is My Best dedicated to the late President Franklin Roosevelt); Cast: Orson Welles, Ray Collins, Lud Gluskin and His Orchestra

== Preservation status ==
All 12 episodes of Hello Americans have survived and are available at the Internet Archive.

"Brazil" is one of four of Welles's wartime radio broadcasts included as supplementary material in the Kino Classics restoration of The Stranger (1946), released on DVD and Blu-ray Disc in October 2013.
