= No Tabuleiro da Baiana =

Samba by Ary Barroso

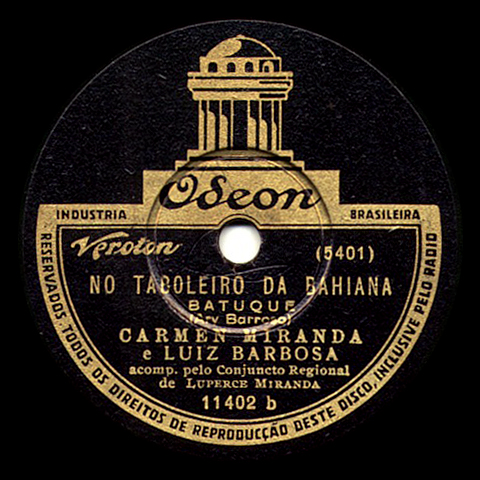

Song by Carmen Miranda with Luiz Barbosa
- Released: November 1936
- Recorded: September 29, 1936
- Genre: Samba
- Label: Odeon Records
- Songwriter: Ary Barroso
- No Tabuleiro da Baiana Carmen Miranda and Luiz Barbosa; Odeon Records 11402B; November 1936

"No Tabuleiro da Baiana" (English: "On the Baiana's Tray") is a samba written in 1936 by Ary Barroso and recorded by Carmen Miranda.

== Notable recordings ==
- Carmen Miranda and Luiz Barbosa, Odeon 11402B. Recorded September 29, 1936; released November 1936. With Conjunto Regional de Pixinguinha and Luperce Miranda. "No Tabuleiro da Baiana" was one of six Brazilian recordings by Carmen Miranda that were reissued in the United States in 1939, launching her career on Decca Records.
- João Gilberto featuring Maria Bethânia, Gilberto Gil, and Caetano Veloso on the seminal album Brasil, released 1981.

== Notable performances ==
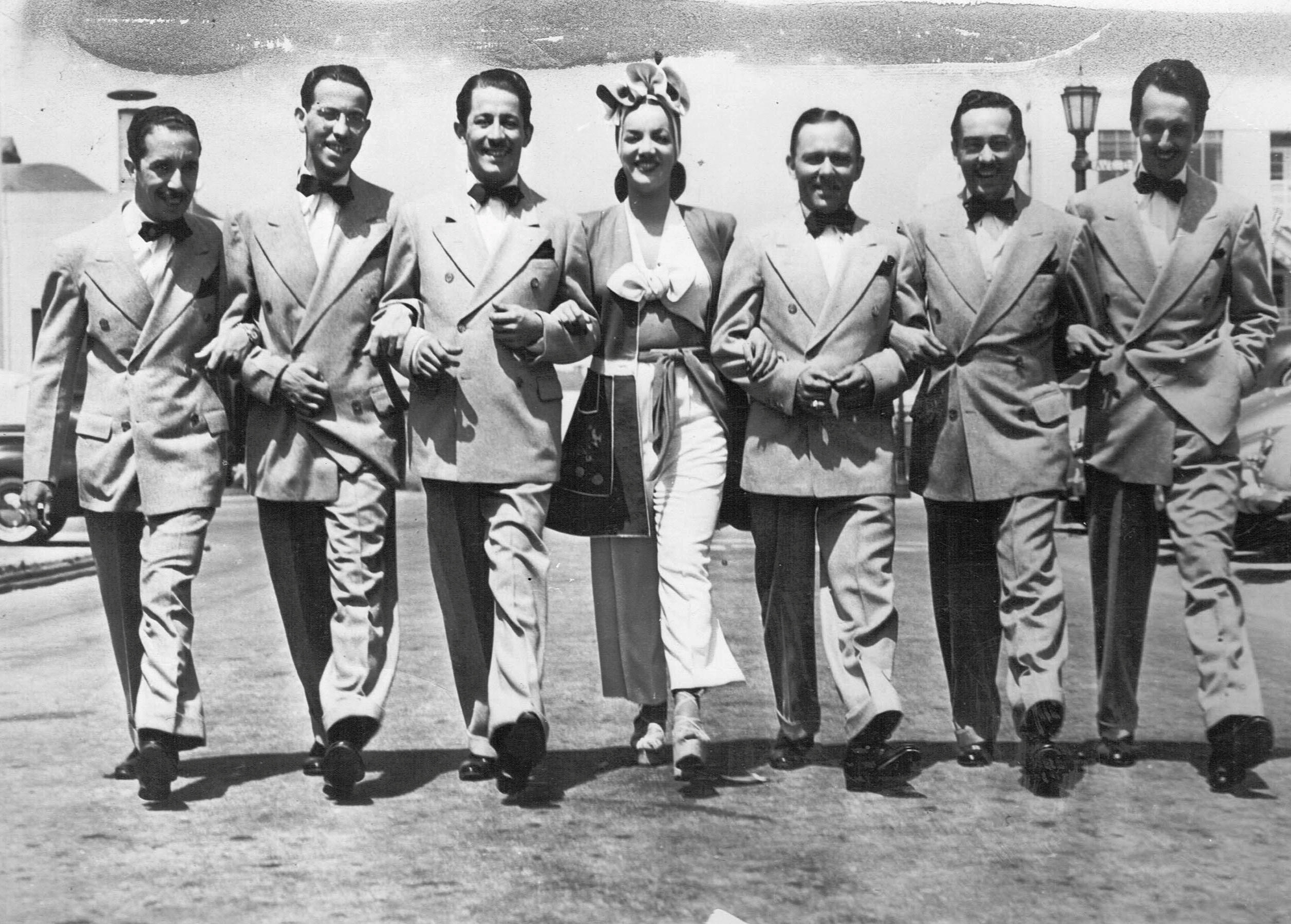
Carmen Miranda and Bando da Lua performed the song with Orson Welles on the debut episode of his radio series Hello Americans on November 15, 1942

- Before Carmen Miranda's recording of "No Tabuleiro da Baiana" was released in November 1936, the song was featured in the Brazilian revue Marvilhosa, performed by Grande Otelo and Déo Maia. Commissioned for the revue by producer Jardel Jércolis, it was the first song ever sold by Ary Barroso. The composer regretted relinquishing the theatrical rights to his song, something he never did again.
- On September 25, 1939, "No Tabuleiro da Baiana" was performed by Andre Kostelanetz and His Orchestra on the CBS Radio series Tune-Up Time. Kostelanetz also conducted his orchestra's performance of the samba in the 1940 film Music in My Heart, starring Tony Martin and Rita Hayworth.
- "No Tabuleiro da Baiana" was performed on the debut episode of Orson Welles's 1942 CBS Radio series Hello Americans. In the episode "Brazil" (November 15, 1942), Welles joined Carmen Miranda, singing the samba in Portuguese. When Aurora Miranda performed the song on the May 3, 1944 episode of his subsequent series The Orson Welles Almanac, Welles also briefly joined her in duet.
- The song is included in the 2015 album Made in Brazil by Brazilian jazz pianist Eliane Elias.

== English-language version ==
In 1942 English lyrics were written by Fred Wise and Milton Leeds, and the song was called "Oh Say, Don José".
