= Fada, Nigeria =

Town in central Nigeria

Coordinates: 7°15′00″N 4°04′00″E

Fada is a town in central Nigeria which is located northeast of Abuja. It is the setting of the 1939 Joyce Cary novel Mister Johnson. Its exact location is latitude 7° 15' 00" N and longitude 4° 04' 00" E.
