= Mister Johnson (novel) =

1939 novel by Joyce Cary

- 1951 edition
- Author: Joyce Cary
- Genre: Adventure fiction
- Publication date: 1939
- Pages: 198

Mister Johnson (1939) is a novel by Joyce Cary. It is the story of a young Nigerian who falls foul of the British colonial authorities. Although the novel has a comic tone, the story itself is tragic. Joyce Cary has been quoted as saying that Mister Johnson was his favourite book that he had written. Mister Johnson is often read in schools and has had a wide audience. It has been adapted as a play by Norman Rosten and a 1990 film by Bruce Beresford. Nigerian author Chinua Achebe has said that Mister Johnson struck him as superficial and helped form his determination to write his own novels about Nigeria. Other critics have found Cary's portrayal of his main character patronising and Johnson himself childish.

== Plot summary ==
Johnson, a young African, is assigned as clerk at a British district office in Fada, Nigeria. He is from a different district and is regarded as a foreigner by those native to the area. Johnson works his way into local society, marrying there only one wife (he is monogamous), but never really fitting in. At the same time, he has difficulties in adjusting to the regulations and mechanism of the district office and his official duties. The district officer, Rudbeck, meanwhile, is dissatisfied with his work in the service and his life in Africa.

Rudbeck conceives the notion that a road linking Fada to the main highway and larger population centers will be of great benefit to the region. Johnson, as Rudbeck's clerk, also becomes enthused about this project. Johnson stands out as one of Cary's most exuberant characters, possessing a contagious enthusiasm that elevates the spirits of everyone around him. People are drawn to Johnson and follow him without realising that they are being led. Indeed, Johnson has no clear idea of where he is going.

His delight is in seeing those around him happy. His mood infects Rudbeck and, when Johnson suggests how the books may be fiddled to support Rudbeck's road project, the colonial officer is seduced. But Rudbeck's swindle is uncovered, and he returns to England to be with his wife. Johnson now goes to work for Gollup, a retired army sergeant who lives with his Nigerian mistress and runs the local store. Gollup is an abusive drunkard given to racist epithets, but he admires Johnson's good-humored courage in facing up to his words and blows.

Johnson, in turn, enjoys the compliment to his courage and, when Gollup next attacks him, retaliates. Gollup does not take this kind of violence seriously and thinks no less of Johnson, but he cannot have an employee who has struck him in public. Johnson is let go and leaves Fada. Meanwhile, a shortage of political officers means that Rudbeck must return. He immediately recommences his road-building. Rudbeck and his superior work out the extent to which he can finagle road-building funds from the accounts, but the older man warns Rudbeck that another scandal will destroy his career.

The road-building brings Johnson back to Fada. Rudbeck hires him again and Johnson's infectious enthusiasm makes the road-building successful. But Rudbeck discovers that Johnson has been engaged in petty graft and dismisses him. Johnson turns to theft from the store to support his lifestyle and, when Gollup discovers him, stabs and kills the storekeeper. Now Rudbeck must try Johnson for murder. The trial brings Rudbeck to breaking point. Johnson's irrepressible optimism renders him incapable of offering a defence, and Rudbeck has no alternative but to find him guilty and sentence him to be hanged. In his report to the governor-general Rudbeck recommends a reprieve, but this is rejected. Johnson begs Rudbeck to keep him from the gallows by shooting him. Rudbeck follows his heart rather than the rules and eventually does so, despite the ramifications for his own career.

== Editions ==
- London: Michael Joseph, 1939
- London: Michael Joseph, 1952
- London: Longmans, Green, 1961
- London: J. M. Dent, 1995 ISBN 0460875876. With a chronology and suggestions for further reading by Douglas Matthews.

== Film adaptation ==
The book was adapted into the 1990 film Mister Johnson starring Maynard Eziashi in the titular role and Pierce Brosnan as Harry Rudbeck. The film was entered into the 41st Berlin International Film Festival, where Eziashi won the Silver Bear for Best Actor—it was his first major film role.

== Other adaptations ==
The novel was adapted for the stage in 1956. The adaptation was by Norman Rosten, and the production starred, among others, Robert Earl Jones.

The 1985 Indian film Massey Sahib, starring Raghubir Yadav and Arundhati Roy, is based on the novel. The setting is changed to British India, and the protagonist is changed to an Indian convert to Christianity who marries a tribal girl and, due to his lack of sophistication and corrupt nature, ends up in suspension and finally gets hanged for murder.
