= Maynard Eziashi =

Nigerian-English actor

- Born: 1965 (age 60–61); London, England
- Occupation: Actor
- Years active: 1986–present

Maynard Eziashi (born 1965 in London, England) is a Nigerian-English actor. In 1991, he won the Silver Bear for Best Actor at the 41st Berlin International Film Festival for his starring role in Mister Johnson (1990).

== Early life ==
Eziashi was born in London, England. He went to The Sacred Heart RC Secondary school in Camberwell New Green, London

== Career ==
Eziashi has been in the international movie business since 1986. In 1991, he won the Silver Bear for Best Actor at the 41st Berlin International Film Festival for his starring role in Mister Johnson (1990) which also starred Pierce Brosnan. Owen Gleiberman of Entertainment Weekly wrote "Eziashi plays him with such a relentless, singsong inscrutability that by the end of the movie, he veers uncomfortably close to becoming a liberal-humanist Stepin Fetchit." Janet Maslin of The New York Times wrote "The lively Mr. Eziashi is good at conveying Johnson's charm and buoyancy, though much of the character's wiliness gets lost." Jay Boyar of the Orlando Sentinel wrote "Mister Johnson is a multilayered character, and Nigerian-born actor Maynard Eziashi knows just when to shed each layer." Dave Kehr of the Chicago Tribune wrote "...as Johnson, the Nigerian actor Eziashi achieves an effective manic blur that allows him to move gracefully between comedy and tragic hysteria." Ralph Novak of People wrote "Eziashi's performance as the title character is a masterful display of subtlety and insight into a man of great loyalty and deep love for his wife and child, as well as irresistible impulses to lie and steal." David Sterritt of The Christian Science Monitor wrote "The triumph of the movie, though, is Nigerian actor Maynard Eziashi playing Mister Johnson himself, in as witty and persuasive a performance as I've seen this year."

Eziashi portrayed Zweli, the son of Danny Glover's character in Bopha! (1993), which was the directorial debut of Morgan Freeman.

Eziashi also worked with Jim Carrey in Ace Ventura: When Nature Calls (1995).

Eziashi has also starred in Twenty-One (1991) and A Good Man in Africa (1994), the latter starring Sean Connery. He also portrayed Edgar in the 2001 film When Brendan Met Trudy. Eziashi reunited with Freeman and Mister Johnson director Bruce Beresford in the 2006 film, The Contract.

"It was pleasurable working with them. Some of them have become good friends and I am still in contact with them till this day," Eziashi says on the number of Hollywood top stars he has worked with.

== 2010s ==
On 22 January 2012 it was reported that Eziashi took part in a film titled, Streets of Calabar. The film also starred Wale Ojo, Anthony Ofoegbu, Lisa Kill and Viquie Christie; the film has been shot on location in Calabar, Cross River State. Eziashi stated that he was portraying, "Chief Detective Okoro." According to Eziashi, Streets of Calabar is the second movie he has done in Nigeria, the first being Mister Johnson which was shot in Jos. "This job am doing now is a fantastic experience for me. Being in Calabar alone has been a pleasurable experience. I have not been in the city before. Everyday am discovering something new," Eziashi says of his experience with the project.

Eziashi also revealed that he would be producing two movies afterwards, which are Incomparable Worlds and The Seven Crossroads.

From 6 November to 1 December 2013 Eziashi participated in the performance of Paul Herzberg's play, The Dead Wait at The Park Theatre in Finsbury Park, where he was portraying the role of George. Eziashi has compared his acting experiences on the production with his past experiences on Bopha! since both stories are set in South Africa. Herzberg also acted in the production, and Eziashi described him as " a very generous man."

== Personal life ==
Eziashi is not well known in Nollywood, but he is well known in Hollywood.

On Nollywood, Eziashi states, "I will say the Nigerian movie industry is doing very well. When we compare the industries we have to take out the advantage of time Hollywood has over Nollywood. If we compare the first 10–20 years of Hollywood with that of Nollywood you would realize Nollywood is doing fabulously well."

Along with acting, Eziashi is also the restaurateur of The Lounge bar and eatery, located in Brixton.

== Filmography ==
Year	Title	Role	Notes
1990	Mister Johnson	Mister Johnson	
1991	Twenty-One	Baldie	
1993	Bopha!	Zweli Mangena	
1994	A Good Man in Africa	Friday, Leafy's Houseman	
1995	Ace Ventura: When Nature Calls	Ouda	
1999	Janice Beard	Clive Morley	
2001	When Brendan Met Trudy	Edgar	
2001	Kiss Kiss (Bang Bang)	Gloria	
2002	Anansi	Sir Francis	
2005	Colour Me Kubrick	Adibe	
2006	The Contract	Robbins	
2007	Saidi's Song	Jite	
2021	Upon the Edge	Finley	
