= Mister Johnson (film) =

1990 film by Bruce Beresford

- Directed by: Bruce Beresford
- Screenplay by: William Boyd
- Based on: Mister Johnson by Joyce Cary
- Produced by: Michael Fitzgerald
- Starring: Pierce Brosnan; Edward Woodward; Maynard Eziashi; Beatie Edney; Denis Quilley
- Cinematography: Peter James
- Edited by: Humphrey Dixon
- Music by: Georges Delerue
- Production company: Avenue Pictures
- Distributed by: 20th Century Fox
- Release dates: 1990 (UK); March 22, 1991 (U.S.)
- Running time: 97 minutes
- Country: United States
- Language: English
- Box office: $1,464,242

Mister Johnson is a 1990 American drama film based on the 1939 novel by Irish author Joyce Cary. The film, set in 1929, stars first-time actor Maynard Eziashi as a Nigerian who works as a clerk for the British civil service and adopts the style of the British colonialists in the belief that he is a true Englishman. It was the first American film to be shot on location in Nigeria.

== Plot ==
Mister Johnson, a Nigerian who has adopted the style of the British colonialists, works as an assistant to the colonialist judge Harry Rudbeck. He marries Bamu in a Christian marriage ceremony and offers to share his "wealth" and "civilized" life with her, though she continues to behave according to her traditional Nigerian role as a wife instead of like an Englishwoman. Waziri offers to pay Johnson to show him government letters from Rudbeck's office, but Johnson refuses out of loyalty to Great Britain. Johnson owes money to several people but Rudbeck is unwilling to give him an advance, and Bamu returns to her family's home because Johnson cannot pay the monthly bridal payment. Johnson accepts money from Waziri in exchange for stealing letters from Rudbeck's office that describe Waziri as a plotting liar.

Judge Rudbeck runs out of money for a 100-mile road he is building to the North Road, a major trade route, and Johnson suggests taking money designated for other government projects and using it for the road instead. Rudbeck's wife, Celia, arrives and is dismayed by the accommodations and food. The treasurer, Mister Tring, arrives and identifies anomalies in the cash book, so he fires Johnson and stops work on the road. Johnson begins working at colonialist merchant Sargy Gollup's store with Benjamin and attempts to make profitable trades himself, but his activities cause Sargy to punch him. Benjamin catches Johnson stealing an advance from Sargy's cash box, which Johnson uses to hold a party. He invites the people inside Sargy's store when it starts to rain, despite Benjamin's objections. Sargy returns and punches Johnson, but Johnson fights back and knocks him out. Rudbeck comes to investigate but Sargy says that it was an accident. He gives Johnson one month's advance pay and fires him.

Johnson and Bamu wander looking for work with their newborn son and when the rainy seasons ends work commences on the road again and Rudbeck gives Johnson a job there as a supervisor. Productivity increases but money runs out and construction stops. Johnson tells locals that there is a prize of five pounds to the group that clears the most bush, to be paid to the chief, and work commences again. The workers reach the North Road and a new trade route is established but Rudbeck discovers that Johnson is charging a road fee. He confronts Johnson, who insists that he was only borrowing a little, and forces him to leave instead of having him arrested.

Johnson, Bamu, and their son return to the Zungo, where Bamu's family insists that she return home to them. Johnson asks Waziri for money but Waziri orders his guards to cripple Johnson. Johnson escapes through a window but finds that his wife has already left. He gets drunk and sneaks into Sargy Gollup's store to steal money from the cash box but Sargy catches him and fires his rifle at him. The two fight and Johnson kills Sargy by stabbing him with a pin used to hold receipts. Waziri is ordered by the chief to either find Johnson or someone else to take the blame. Johnson visits his wife to ask for food, where her brother clubs him and turns him in to the authorities. In jail, Waziri's former assistant convinces Johnson to give him his English shoes since he will be hanged soon. After his conviction, Johnson begs Rudbeck to shoot him in order to spare him from hanging. The next morning, Johnson once again begs Rudbeck to shoot him, or at least hang him by his own hand as he considered Rudbeck his friend. After Johnson sang a song about fear, Rudbeck grabs a rifle and shoots Johnson, knowing fully well that this could have an adverse impact on his career.

== Cast ==
- Maynard Eziashi as Mister Johnson
- Pierce Brosnan as Harry Rudbeck
- Edward Woodward as Sargy Gollup
- Beatie Edney as Celia Rudbeck
- Denis Quilley as Bulteen
- Nick Reding as Tring
- Bella Enahoro as Bamu
- Femi Fatoba as Waziri
- Kwabena Manso as Benjamin
- Hubert Ogunde as Brimah (credited as Chief Hubert Ogunde)
- Sola Adeyemi as Ajali
- Jerry Linus as Saleh
- George Menta as Emil

== Production ==
Adapting the film was a dream project of director John Huston, who loved the novel. The film was shot in Toro, Nigeria, using mostly local actors. It was the first American film to be shot on location in Nigeria. The film is dedicated to the memory of Chief Hubert Ogunde, who helped recruit 150 extras for the road-digging scenes but died in 1990 before the film's completion.

== Release ==
The film did not do well in box office in the US release, as Avenue Pictures, the film's U.S. distribution company, went bankrupt before the release date and "there was no money to release the film", according to the film's producer Michael Fitzgerald, in an interview conducted for Criterion Collection's home video release. Nevertheless, Fitzgerald consider this his "favorite film". The director Bruce Beresford said "... this is the best-reviewed film I have ever made.... My memory is, Mr. Johnson is the best film I have ever made." The film was given a PG-13 rating in the United States and a 12 rating by the British Board of Film Classification.

== Reception ==
The film was well reviewed, but met with criticism for depicting Africans as servants to colonial Britons.

In a positive review of the film, Janet Maslin of The New York Times wrote that "Mr. Beresford's film acknowledges the boundless optimism of its leading character even as it watches him paint himself into a corner" and that Johnson "is at his most purely touching in such joyous moments, loyally celebrating English principles even as they bring about his downfall."

Roger Ebert gave the film three stars, writing that it "is a very subtle film, one where the ideas are sometimes in danger of being overwhelmed by the sheer exuberance of Eziashi's performance." John Simon of the National Review called Mister Johnson a work of genius.

Mike D'Angelo of The A.V. Club wrote that "Johnson comes across on screen as gratifyingly complex—both a scoundrel and a hero, often at the same time. His unfailing optimism, even in the bleakest circumstances, makes him nearly impossible to dislike, no matter what sort of chicanery he's employing or advocating." He summarized that "it's a stronger picture than cinema history perhaps recalls, and welcome evidence that the director of 1989’s alleged Best Picture, though ignored by the Oscars, deserves some attention."

Owen Gleiberman of Entertainment Weekly gave the film a rating of B−, writing that "Johnson, the invisible scoundrel, is never quite as innocent as he seems. Yet when you come right down to it, he’s still pretty innocent. Eziashi plays him with such a relentless, singsong inscrutability that by the end of the movie, he veers uncomfortably close to becoming a liberal-humanist Stepin Fetchit."

Clayton Dillard of Slant Magazine gave the film a rating of 3 1/2 out of four stars, writing, "As Bruce Beresford’s follow-up to Driving Miss Daisy, Mister Johnson is both a departure and a continuation, trekking toward more difficult narrative terrain given the colonial African setting, but united by the director’s continued interest in depicting characters, on all sides of a given conflict, with considered compassion."

In a positive essay about the film, Neil Sinyard of The Criterion Collection wrote that "Beresford is always alert to the comedy of the material" and that Eziashi's performance "was deservedly awarded a Silver Bear at the 1991 Berlin Film Festival."

A review of the film in Time Out states that Beresford "photographs the landscape prettily, and the film is neatly turned. Eminently respectable, in fact."

In a negative review of the film, Tom Tunney of Empire wrote that the film "fails abysmally because of the grinning shallowness of Eziashi's portrayal and, secondly and much more crucially, because the role he's been lumbered with is a demeaningly cheerful stereotype of the kind that should have gone out with Uncle Tom's Cabin."

On Rotten Tomatoes the film has an approval rating of 78% based on reviews from 18 critics.

== Accolades ==
The film was entered into the 41st Berlin International Film Festival, where lead Maynard Eziashi won the Silver Bear for Best Actor—it was his first major film role.

== Criterion Edition ==
The film was added to The Criterion Collection along with Beresford's 1980 film Breaker Morant on DVD and Blu-ray on September 22, 2015.
