= Norman Rosten =

American poet

- Born: January 1, 1913; New York City, US
- Died: March 7, 1995 (aged 82); New York City, US
- Education: Brooklyn College; New York University; University of Michigan
- Spouse: Hedda Rowinski (m. 1940–1984)
- Children: 1
- Writing career
- Notable work: Screenplay for Vu du Pont
- Notable awards: Yale Series of Younger Poets Competition; Guggenheim Fellowship

Norman Rosten (January 1, 1913 – March 7, 1995) was an American poet, playwright, and novelist.

== Early life ==
Rosten was born to a Polish Jewish family in New York City and grew up in Hurleyville, New York. He graduated from Brooklyn College and New York University, and the University of Michigan, where he met Arthur Miller. Each won the Avery Hopwood Award.

== Career ==
In 1979, Brooklyn's borough president Howard Golden named Rosten as the poet laureate of Brooklyn.

Among Rosten's work outside the field of poetry, he wrote the libretto for Ezra Laderman's opera Marilyn. He also wrote the screenplay for Sidney Lumet's film Vu du Pont, adapting Miller's A View from the Bridge. He visited Mickey Knox in Rome.

Rosten was a poetry consultant for Simon and Schuster Publishers. It was through that role that he came to know fellow poet Andrew Glaze. The two became friends and Glaze later dedicated his book I am the Jefferson County Courthouse to Rosten.

His work appeared in The New Yorker.

== Death ==
Rosten married his wife, Hedda Rowinski, in 1938. Together they had one child, daughter Patricia, in 1946. He resided in Brooklyn after college. The Rostens knew Marilyn Monroe for the last seven years of her life.

Rosten died in New York City from congestive heart failure on March 7, 1995, at the age of 81.

== Awards ==
- 1940 Yale Series of Younger Poets Competition
- 1941 Guggenheim Fellowship

== Works ==
=== Poetry ===
- Return Again, Traveler, Yale University Press, 1940
- The big road: a narrative poem, Rinehart & Company, Inc., 1946
- Imagine Seeing You Here: a world of poetry, lively and lyrical
- Thrive Upon the Rock, Trident Press, 1965
- Selected Poems. G. Braziller. 1979. ISBN 978-0-8076-0938-5.
- Patricia Rosten Filan, ed. (2004). A City Is. Illustrator Melanie Hope Greenberg. Macmillan. ISBN 978-0-8050-6793-4.
- In Guernica

=== Plays ===
- First Stop to Heaven, 1941
- Mister Johnson, an adaptation of Joyce Cary's novel of the same name (premiere 1956)
- Mardi Gras
- The Golden Door
- Come Slowly, Eden. Dramatists Play Service, Inc. 1967. ISBN 978-0-8222-0228-8.

=== Novels ===
- Under the Boardwalk, Prentice-Hall, 1968
- Over and Out, G. Braziller, 1972
- Love in All Its Disguises. Arbor House. 1981. ISBN 978-0-87795-324-1.
- Neighborhood Tales. G. Braziller. 1986. ISBN 978-0-8076-1152-4.

=== Non-fiction ===
- Marilyn: An Untold Story, New American Library, 1973
- Marilyn among Friends, with photographer Sam Shaw. UK: Bloomsbury (1987)

=== Anthologies ===
- Cary Nelson, ed. (2002). "The March". The wound and the dream: sixty years of American poems about the Spanish Civil War. University of Illinois Press. ISBN 978-0-252-07070-9.
