= List of boogie woogie musicians =

Boogie woogie musicians are those artists who are primarily recognized as writing, performing, and recording boogie woogie music.

== A ==
- Rob Agerbeek (1937–2023), Indonesian-born Dutch boogie-woogie and early jazz pianist
- Dave Alexander (1938–2012), aka 'Omar Sharriff", American blues pianist
- Albert Ammons (1907–1949), American pianist, father of bebop tenorman Gene Ammons
- The Andrews Sisters, American singers known for "Beat Me Daddy, Eight to the Bar" and "Boogie Woogie Bugle Boy"
- Winifred Atwell (1914–1983), British pianist, from Trinidad

== B ==
- Bob Baldori (born 1943), aka "Boogie Bob", American rock, blues, and boogie-woogie musician
- Marcia Ball (born 1949), American singer and pianist
- Black Ivory King (1899–1947), American pianist and singer, best known for his original version of the then popular train blues song, "The Flying Crow"
- Deanna Bogart (born 1959), American singer, pianist, and saxophonist
- Boogie Woogie Red (1925–1992), American pianist, frequent collaborator with John Lee Hooker
- James Booker (1939–1983), American pianist
- Eden Brent (born 1965), American pianist and vocalist
- Hadda Brooks (1916–2002), American pianist, vocalist and composer, who was billed as "Queen of the Boogie".

== C ==
- Leroy Carr (1905–1935), American pianist and singer, known for "Barrel House Woman No. 2" and "How Long, How Long Blues"
- James Crutchfield (1912–2001), "King of Barrelhouse Blues"
- Lluís Coloma (born 1973), Spanish blues and boogie woogie pianist and composer

== D ==
- Caroline Dahl, (birth date unknown), American pianist and composer of boogie-woogie and American roots music
- Cow Cow Davenport (1894–1955), American pianist
- Blind John Davis (1913–1985), American pianist and singer
- Daryl Davis (born 1958), American pianist, singer and bandleader
- Neville Dickie (born 1937), English pianist
- Fats Domino (1928–2017), American R&B pianist and singer who recorded some boogie pieces in the 1950s
- Floyd Domino, American pianist; played for seven years with Asleep at the Wheel
- Dorothy Donegan (1922–1998), American pianist
- Thomas A. Dorsey (1899–1993), American pianist and gospel songwriter
- Champion Jack Dupree (1908–1992), New Orleans blues player
- Big Joe Duskin (1921–2007), American pianist

== E ==
- William Ezell (1892–1963), Texas-born pianist who combined boogie-woogie with ragtime and blues

== F ==
- Ernie Freeman (1922–1981), American pianist, organist, and arranger

== G ==
- Blind Leroy Garnett (1897–1933)
- Harry Gibson, "The Hipster" (1915–1991)
- Rosco Gordon, (1828–2002), American pianist and singer, known for "Rosco's Boogie", "T-Model Boogie", and "Kickin' the Boogie"
- Henry Gray (1925–2020), American pianist credited with helping to create the Chicago blues piano sound

== H ==
- Bob Hall (born 1942), English pianist
- Willie Hall (died 1930), known as Drive'em Down, model and mentor to many New Orleans players
- Erwin Helfer (born 1936), Chicago pianist
- Jools Holland (born 1958), British musician and television presenter
- Camille Howard (1914–1993), American pianist and singer
- John Lee Hooker (1912 or 1917–2001) American blues singer, songwriter, and guitarist

== J ==
- Dr. John (1941–2019), New Orleans blues and boogie woogie pianist and composer of "Boxcar Boogie" among others
- Pete Johnson (1904–1967), Big Joe Turner's piano partner; "Roll 'Em Pete" was named for him
- Louis Jordan (1908–1975), American boogie and jump blues musician, songwriter and bandleader

== K ==
- Michael Kaeshammer (born 1977), Canadian pianist, vocalist, and arranger
- Shizuko Kasagi (1914–1985), Japanese singer known in Japan as the "Queen of the Boogie-Woogie" (ブギの女王, Bugi no ojō)}]}
- Brendan Kavanagh (born 1967), contemporary British pianist teacher with over one million YouTube followers, known as "Dr K"

== L ==
- Ladyva (Vanessa Sabrina Gnaegi) (born 1988), Swiss pianist
- Booker T. Laury (1914–1995), American pianist and singer
- Jerry Lee Lewis (1935–2022), American pianist and singer whose boogie woogie influence permeates songs like: "Lewis Boogie", "Hadacol Boogie", "Boogie Woogie Country Man", and "Don't Boogie Woogie When You Say Your Prayers Tonight"
- Meade Lux Lewis (1905–1964), American pianist whose "Honky Tonk Train Blues" was an early boogie woogie hit
- Liberace (1919–1987), American pianist
- Little Willie Littlefield (1931–2013), American pianist and singer
- Cripple Clarence Lofton (1887–1957)
- Professor Longhair (1918–1980), American singer; blues, rhythm and blues, and jazz pianist

== M ==
- Barrelhouse Buck McFarland (1903–1962)
- Memphis Slim (1915–1988)
- Big Maceo Merriweather (1905–1953), composer of "Chicago Breakdown"
- Arthur Migliazza (born 1980), American blues and boogie woogie pianist.
- Little Brother Montgomery (1906–1985) American blues and boogie woogie pianist and singer known for "44 Blues" and "Vicksburg Blues"
- Moon Mullican (1909–1967), known as the "King of the Hillbilly Piano Players" during a recording career that stretched from the 1930s through the 1960s, including hits such as "Seven Nights to Rock"; considered a major influence on Jerry Lee Lewis

== N ==
- Romeo Nelson (1902–1974)
- Charlie Norman (1920–2005), Swedish piano player

== P ==
- Oscar Peterson (1925–2007), Canadian jazz pianist and composer
- Piano Red (1911–1985), brother of Speckled Red
- Piano "C" Red (1933–2013), Chicago blues and boogie-woogie pianist, singer and composer
- Honey Piazza (born 1951), West Coast blues and boogie-woogie pianist
- Pinetop Perkins (1913–2011), American musician and teacher of Ike Turner
- Preacher Jack (born 1942), stage name of John Lincoln Coughlin, American pianist, recording artist on Rounder Records
- Sammy Price (1908–1992), American pianist and bandleader

== R ==
- Maurice Rocco (1915–1976), American pianist, singer, and actor
- Walter Roland (1903–1972), American pianist, guitarist, and singer

== S ==
- Ulf Sandström (born 1964), Swedish pianist and member of jump4joy
- Bob Seeley (1928–2024), American pianist
- Luca Sestak (born 1995), German boogie-woogie, blues and jazz pianist
- Robert Shaw (1908–1985), American barrelhouse pianist, recorded "The Ma Grinder"
- Freddie Slack (1910–1965), American pianist and bandleader, originator of "Beat Me Daddy, Eight To The Bar" in the 1940s
- Sunnyland Slim (1906–1995), American pianist and singer, recorded "Lowdown Sunnyland Train"
- Huey "Piano" Smith (1934–2023), "Rockin' Pneumonia and the Boogie Woogie Flu", also accompanist on Frankie Ford's "Sea Cruise"
- Pinetop Smith (1904–1929), "Pine Top's Boogie Woogie" in 1929 was the first boogie-woogie hit and popularized the name for the style
- Charlie Spand (1893–after 1958)
- Otis Spann (1924–1970), American pianist and singer, part of the postwar Chicago blues scene, with boogie songs including "Spann's Stomp", and "Otis In The Dark"
- Speckled Red (1892–1973), American pianist and singer, recorded "The Dirty Dozens"
- Roosevelt Sykes (1906–1983), American pianist known as the Honeydripper, he recorded "Forty-Four", "Driving Wheel" and "Night Time Is the Right Time".

== T ==
- Montana Taylor (1903–1958), American pianist
- George Washington Thomas (1883–1937), American pianist and songwriter
- Hersal Thomas (1906–1926), American pianist and composer
- Stephanie Trick (born 1987), contemporary American pianist
- Big Joe Turner (1911–1985), American boogie-woogie singer, partnered with Pete Johnson

== V ==
- Mose Vinson (1917–2002), American boogie woogie and blues pianist

== W ==
- Tuts Washington (1907–1984), mentor to many generations of New Orleans pianists
- Kenny "Blues Boss" Wayne (born 1944), American-born boogie-woogie/blues/R&B pianist
- Vince Weber (1953–2020), German boogie/blues musician
- Robert Wells (born 1962), Swedish pianist, singer, and composer
- Jabo Williams (possible 1895–1953 or 1954), American pianist and songwriter
- Mitch Woods (born 1951), American modern day boogie-woogie, jazz and jump blues pianist

== Y ==
- Jimmy Yancey (1898–1951), American pianist, composer, and lyricist

== Z ==
- Silvan Zingg (born 1973), Swiss pianist
- Axel Zwingenberger (born 1955), German pianist and composer

== Bibliography ==
- The Story of Boogie-Woogie - A Left Hand Like God, Silvester, Peter J., The Scarecrow Press, 2009, Maryland (USA), 2nd edition, ISBN 9780810869240
