= Brunn am Gebirge =

Brunn am Gebirge Brunn aum Gebiage
- Municipality
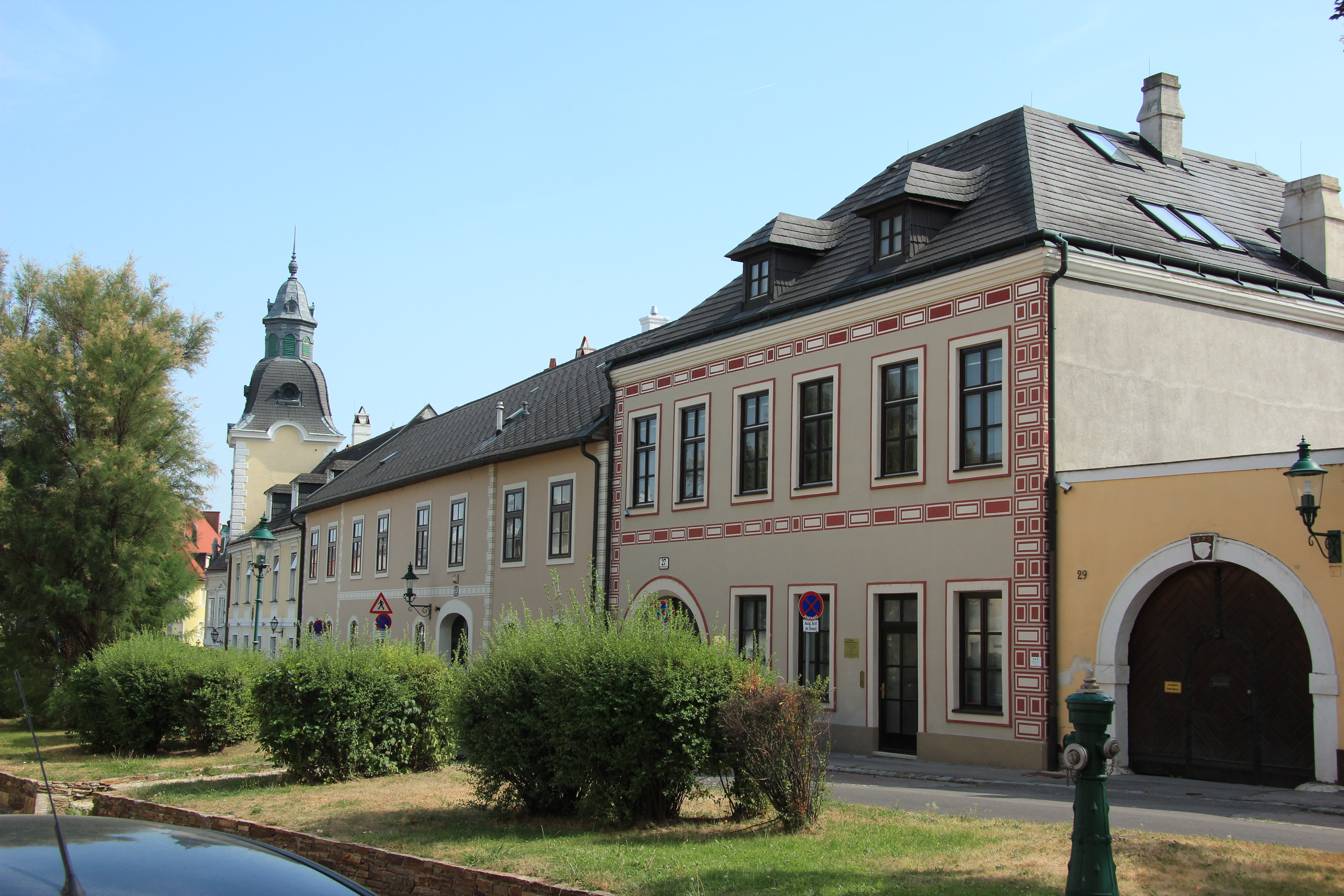
- Street in Brunn

- Coat of arms

- Location within Austria
- Coordinates: 48°6′N 16°17′E
- Country: Austria
- State: Lower Austria
- District: Mödling

Government
  - Mayor: Andreas Linhart (Social Democratic Party of Austria)

Area
  - Total: 7.26 km^{2} (2.80 sq mi)
- Elevation: 295 m (968 ft)

Population (2018-01-01)
  - Total: 11,864
  - Density: 1,630/km^{2} (4,230/sq mi)
- Time zone: UTC+1 (CET)
  - Summer (DST): UTC+2 (CEST)
- Postal code: 2345
- Area code: 02236
- Website: Brunnamgebirge.at

Brunn am Gebirge (Central Bavarian: Brunn aum Gebiage) is a town in the district of Mödling in the Austrian state of Lower Austria. As of the end of 2022, the population was recorded at 12,218.

== History ==
Excavations from the Neolithic period show that the area was already inhabited 6000 BC and Brunn making it the earliest known farming settlement in Austria. Also Awarengräber that were found in Mödling, suggest that inhabited the area at that time already. Because of excavations, it is believed that the Roman settlement here was for veterans.

In modern times, it was the birthplace (1890) of the composer Hans Gál.

== Culture ==
Since 2007 Brunn am Gebirge is organizer of the International Piano Blues and Boogie Woogie Festival where Little Willie Littlefield, Carl Sonny Leyland, Axel Zwingenberger, Dana Gillespie, Sonny and his Wild Cows, Michael Pewny, Stella Jones, Kim Cooper from The Rounder Girls, Lila Ammons, Vince Weber, Silvan Zingg, Axel Ramerseder, Mojo Blues Band, Jan Preston, Martin Pyrker, Al Cook, The Untuchables, The Hot Shakers, Ed Philips, Meena Cryle, The Boogie Boys, Dan Popek, Wendy De Witt, Angela Brown, Janice Harrington and many more performed.

== Population ==
Historical population
Year	Pop.	±%
1971	7,080	—
1981	7,975	+12.6%
1991	8,573	+7.5%
2001	9,422	+9.9%
2011	11,196	+18.8%
2021	12,045	+7.6%
