= Cili Marsall =

Hungarian musician

Cili Marsall (born 2000 Budapest) is a pianist and clarinetist. Her specialities are stride, jazz and boogie-woogie. Furthermore, she has also been performing as a singer.

== Biography ==
Cili Marsall is the daughter of clarinettist and saxophonist David László Marsall, with whom she has performed since her teenage years. She received her first piano lessons at the age of six, but soon switched to the clarinet at the age of twelve and studied with Marcell Horvath. In 2014, she won a composition prize awarded by the Cédrus Art Foundation in Hungary and, the following year, she took first place in the Érd regional clarinet competition. She subsequently won further clarinet competitions.

At the age of 16, she chose the piano as her main instrument. She was trained, amongst others, by Andreas Sobczyk in Vienna and Balázs Dániel in Győr, and has been studying jazz piano at the Anton Bruckner Private University in Linz since 2019.

In 2018, she performed with the Marshall Quartet at the Bohém Ragtime Jazz Festival (Kecskemét).

Axel Zwingenberger invited Cili Marsall to take part in his concert at the Metropol in Vienna from 2019. Since then, she has frequently performed alongside Zwingenberger, as well as stars such as Vince Weber and George Neville Dickie. In 2024, she performed at Joja Wendt’s New Year’s concert at the Elbphilharmonie in Hamburg. She teaches at the Modern Music Piano Academy.

In 2023, Cili Marsall gave a concert with Martin Pyrker at the Vienna Blues Spring, at the Mozarthaus; in 2024, she presented a solo programme at the RadioCafé Wien and took part in the Edinburgh Jazz & Blues Festival. In 2025, she performed with Brendan Kavanagh in London.

Her first CD, ‘Piano meets Bass Saxophone’, was released in 2019. In the same year, she was named Newcomer of the Year by the Hamburg Boogie-Woogie Connection.

Another CD followed in 2022.

Cili Marsall performs at festivals such as the Boogie-Woogie Festival in Laneuveville (Switzerland), Blues in Hell (Norway) and the Boogie-Woogie Festival in Laroquebrou (France) and has already collaborated with big names in boogie-woogie such as Ladyva, Luca Filastro and Carl Sonny Leyland.

Marsall also composes her own piano pieces.
