= Caroline Dahl =

American pianist and composer

Caroline Dahl is an American pianist and composer of boogie woogie and American roots music.

She is originally from Louisville, Kentucky, where she played with the Metropolitan Blues All Stars. She has lived in San Francisco for more than 35 years, where she performs solo around the Bay area and with Tom Rigney & Flambeau. She also performed regularly for more than 25 years at Sunday brunches at Mama's Royal Café in Mill Valley. Dahl is also an award-winning fiber artist.

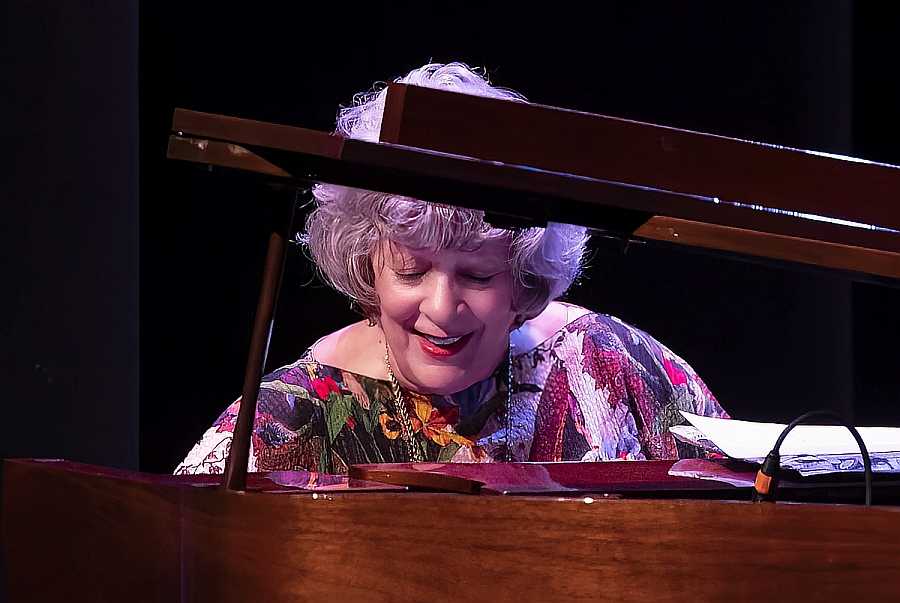
Dahl in 2023

The American Music Research Foundation calls Dahl "a self-taught master of the American roots styles of Boogie Woogie, Blues, vintage R&B, Jazz, Swing, and Country Swing." She has headlined at festivals in the United States, Europe and Canada, including the Sun Valley Jazz Festival, the International Boogie Woogie Festival in Switzerland, the Festival de Blues in Barcelona, the Motor City Boogie Woogie Festival in Detroit, the International Boogie Woogie Festival in Laroquebrou, France, the Brussels Boogie Woogie Piano Summit, and Boogie Woogie Festivals in Paris at Villebon sur Yvette & Vierreres du Buisson.

== Discography ==
- 2005: No Hats (Globe Records)
- 2006: Night House (Globe Records)
- 2013: Devil Digit Boogie Woogie (Hexadact Records)
- 2021: A 'Boogie Woogie State of Mind' (Hexadact Records)
