= Barrelhouse Buck McFarland =

American songwriter

- Born: Thomas F. McFarland; September 16, 1903; Alton, Illinois, United States
- Died: April 8, 1962 (aged 58) Alton, Illinois, United States
- Genres: Blues, boogie-woogie
- Occupation(s): Pianist, singer, composer
- Instrument: Piano
- Years active: 1920s–1962
- Labels: Paramount, Decca, Folkways, Delmark

Thomas F. McFarland (September 16, 1903 – April 8, 1962), known professionally as Barrelhouse Buck McFarland was an American blues and boogie-woogie pianist, singer and composer. He first recorded material in the early 1930s, but had to wait until three decades later, before providing his 'barrelhouse' swan song.

== Life and career ==
He was born in Alton, Illinois, United States, the son of William Henry and Elizabeth "Lizzie" McFarland, as one of 12 siblings.

He moved with his family to St. Louis, Missouri, before World War I, and then to Detroit, Michigan, in 1951. In his youth, McFarland learned to play the piano and often provided the entertainment at his mother's house parties. His ability was enhanced by mixing with itinerant pianists passing through St. Louis, and playing in a number of local clubs, particularly at Johnny Pegg's Club on Biddle Street. He subsequently toured the South with the Georgia Smart Set Show. His first recording took place in Grafton, Wisconsin, probably in November 1929, which resulted in two tracks being issued the following year. These were "St. Louis Fire Blues" and "On Your Way", which were released on Paramount Records. On the disc he was billed as Buck McFarland. Spotted in 1934 by the musician and talent scout, Charley Jordan, McFarland recorded two sides, "I Got to Go Blues" and "Lamp Post Blues", on August 20, 1934, in Chicago, which were released by Decca Records that year. Three other tracks he recorded around that time were unissued. He sang in a reflective manner and used a more percussive barrelhouse piano playing style than his contemporaries. On the 1934 recordings, McFarland played the piano and sang in a gruffer, deeper voice than before, and was accompanied by Peetie Wheatstraw on guitar, Lem Johnson (clarinet), plus an unknown fiddle player. The recordings were not a commercial success and further opportunities to record were then left unfulfilled, due to effects of the Great Depression.

McFarland was not recorded throughout the rest of that decade, nor in the 1940s and 1950s, but as interest in blues music started to grow again in the late 1950s, in the so-called American folk music revival, agents were despatched to try to seek out those musicians, who were still alive and capable of performing. In February 1957, Bob Koester was informed that McFarland was still around St. Louis. With help from fellow St. Louis Jazz Club member Charlie O’Brien, they managed to track McFarland down, when he was visiting relatives in his birthplace of Alton. McFarland cut his session for Folkways Records, under the production of Sam Charters. In 1962, Backcountry Barrelhouse was released as a seven track cassette. Charters commented in the collection's liner notes that McFarland's piano playing had a rural charm, dubbing it "backcountry", and noted that McFarland had remained faithful to the classic barrelhouse style from decades earlier. However, the recording was equally noted for the fact that the piano was out-of-tune, and the overall sound had "noticeable warble from the tape".

On August 6, 1961, McFarland got another opportunity to record. He performed with just his voice and piano accompaniment, in the same gutsy, outgoing and tough style, as was reminiscent of true "barrelhouse". Alton Blues, which was re-released on CD in 2007, contained pieces such as "Alton Blues", "Mercy Blues", and "I Got to Go Blues", which one reviewer commented "all sound like rewrites of 'St. Louis Fire Blues'". Several cuts, including "So Long Buck", were in a similar manner to the earlier "On Your Way", and utilised a 16-bar blues formula, but instead of the more usual dominant toward the end of the progression, "there is one and a half bars of the submediant (vi)". Several reviewers commented Alton Blues had the best sound of all his recordings.

Before McFarland had any chance to capitalise, he died eight months after the recording, on April 8, 1962. In 2016 the Killer Blues Headstone Project placed a headstone for him at the Alton National Cemetery in Alton, Illinois.

== Legacy ==
Early tracks by McFarland were reissued on several compilation albums, including The Blues Box - Country Blues (1968), The Blues in St. Louis, 1929-1937 (1969), and Barrel House Piano (2009). In 2009, Wolf Records released a compilation album, Barrel House Piano, which included 18 tracks by Speckled Red and five by McFarland. All of the barrelhouse recordings were from 1929 to 1938, and originally recorded in either Chicago or Aurora, Illinois.

== Discography ==
=== Singles ===
Year	Title (A-side / B-side)	Record label	Credited to				
Year	Title (A-side / B-side)	Record label	Credited to	1930	"St Louis Fire Blues" / "On Your Way"	Paramount Records	Buck McFarland
1934	"I Got to Go Blues" / "Lamp Post Blues"	Decca Records	Barrel House Buck				

=== Albums ===
Year	Title	Record label	Credited to
1961	Backcountry Barrelhouse	Folkways Records	Barrelhouse Buck
1961	Alton Blues	Delmark Records (released on CD in 2007)	Barrelhouse Buck McFarland

=== Selected compilation albums ===
Year	Title	Record label	Credited to
2009	Barrel House Piano	Wolf Records	Speckled Red & Barrel House Buck McFarland

== See also ==
- List of boogie woogie musicians
