= Bob Koester =

American music executive (1932–2021)

Robert Gregg Koester (October 30, 1932 – May 12, 2021) was an American record producer and businessman who was the founder and owner of Delmark Records, a jazz and blues independent record label. He also operated the Jazz Record Mart in Chicago, which he billed as the "World's Largest Jazz and Blues Specialty Store", and later a record store specializing in blues and jazz in Irving Park, Chicago.

== Early life ==
Koester was born in Wichita, Kansas, on October 30, 1932. He began collecting and trading classic 78 rpm records when he was in high school. He studied business and cinematography at Saint Louis University starting in 1951.

== Career ==
While in university, Koester sold records by mail order from his dormitory room. He subsequently dropped out, and became a founding member of the St. Louis Jazz Club. There, he met Ron Fister, another record collector. The two of them opened a small record store, K & F Sales. On moving to bigger premises they renamed it Blue Note Record Shop. After nearly a year together, Koester and Fister decided to split their business and Koester founded Delmar Records, on Delmar Boulevard. Delmar first recorded a traditional jazz group in 1953 and then searched out and recorded blues musicians of the 1920s and 1930s (Speckled Red, Big Joe Williams, J.D. Short, Barrelhouse Buck McFarland, and James Crutchfield among others) who were living in St. Louis. The name of the label was changed from Delmar to Delmark, partly because of copyright issues.

Koester moved to Chicago in 1958. He purchased Seymour's Jazz Mart, in the Roosevelt University Building, from Seymour Schwartz in 1959. Four years later, he relocated the Jazz Record Mart and Delmark Records to 7 West Grand Avenue. He purchased premises at 4243 N. Lincoln Avenue and moved Delmark there in 1971. Koester was inducted into the Blues Hall of Fame in 1996. He became one of only a few non-performers to have been so-honored by the museum.

The Jazz Record Mart moved to 27 East Illinois in 2006. The rent at that location ultimately proved too costly, and Koester closed the store after selling off its entire inventory to Wolfgang's Vault. He reopened the store in the Horner Park neighborhood at the end of April 2016, in the front room of his Delmark Records studio at 4121 N. Rockwell St. Shortly afterwards, he opened a smaller outlet at Irving Park Road called Bob’s Blues & Jazz Mart. He sold Delmark two years later.

== Personal life ==
Koester married his wife, Susan, in 1968. They met at the West Grand Avenue store, located across the street from the American Medical Association where she worked. They remained married for 53 years until his death. Together, they had two children: Bob Jr. and Kate.

Koester died on May 12, 2021, while in hospice care. He was 88, and suffered a stroke prior to his death. His son took over the management of the store on Irving Park Road.
