= Cili =

Cili may refer to:

- Cili County
- Cili, an effigy of Dewi Sri made from lontar palm leaves
- Čili, restaurants
- Cili Marsall, pianist
