= Montevallo, Alabama =

City in Alabama, United States

- City
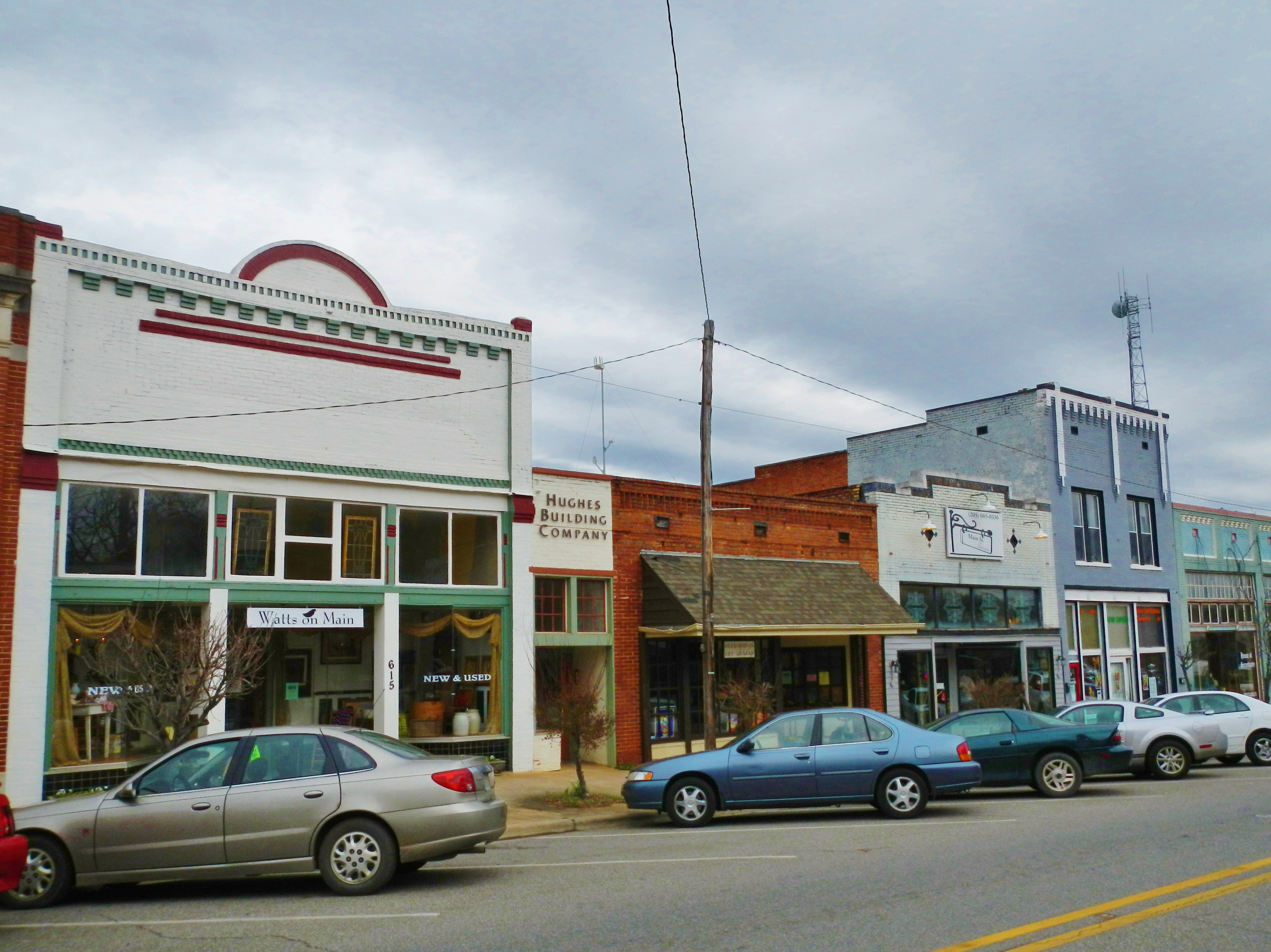
- Montevallo in 2012

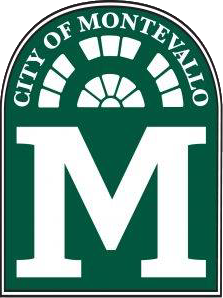
- Flag Seal Logo

- Location of Montevallo in Shelby County, Alabama.
- Coordinates: 33°07′30″N 86°51′46″W
- Country: United States
- State: Alabama
- County: Shelby
- Settled: 1815
- Incorporated: 1848

Area
  - Total: 13.09 sq mi (33.90 km^{2})
  - Land: 12.81 sq mi (33.17 km^{2})
  - Water: 0.28 sq mi (0.73 km^{2})
- Elevation: 430 ft (130 m)

Population (2020)
  - Total: 7,229
  - Density: 564.5/sq mi (217.96/km^{2})
- Time zone: UTC−6 (Central (CST))
  - Summer (DST): UTC−5 (CDT)
- ZIP code: 35115
- Area code: 205, 659
- FIPS code: 01-50312
- GNIS feature ID: 2404287
- Website: Official website

Montevallo is a city in Shelby County, Alabama, United States. A college town, it is the home of the University of Montevallo, a public liberal arts university with approximately 3,000 students. As of the 2020 census, the population of the city of Montevallo is 7,229.

== Geography ==
A plaque on Reynolds Cemetery Road, just off Alabama State Route 25, in the eastern corner of the town, marks the geographic center of the state of Alabama. Middle Street, formerly known as Main Street, had its name changed in 1899 for this reason, upon the completion of a new state survey.

According to the U.S. Census Bureau, the city has a total area of 7.7 square miles (20 km^{2}), of which 7.6 square miles (20 km^{2}) is land and 0.1 square miles (0.26 km^{2}) (0.66%) is water.

== History ==
The area where Montevallo is now was controlled by the Creek Indians. After being acquired in 1814, Jesse Wilson claimed a small hill on the northern bank of Wilson's Creek by the present Montevallo City Cemetery and created a homestead there, making it the oldest settlement in Shelby County. Wilson's friends and family followed afterwards and also settled in the area, and a settlement known as Wilson's Hill developed on the site. The settlement's location at almost the exact center of Alabama meant it was considered one of the potential sites for the University of Alabama. In an attempt to encourage the university to choose the site the settlement changed its name to Montevallo, which is Italian for the hill in the valley.

Montevallo was used by local farmers as a market town where they could sell and package their produce. It was incorporated as a city in 1848. In 1853 a railway was built between Montevallo and Selma which allowed further economic growth to Montevallo and in 1856 a coal mine was created nearby leading to further growth.

During the American Civil War, Union troops under the command of James H. Wilson camped in Montevallo in the spring of 1865 and skirmished with Confederates near the railroad depot. After the war, commercial life and growth was dominated by the coal mine owned by Truman Aldrich who leased the mine and attempted to increase production in response to the growing iron industry in the region and the growing city of Birmingham. Starting in 1890, company owned worker housing was built in Montevallo to house miners.

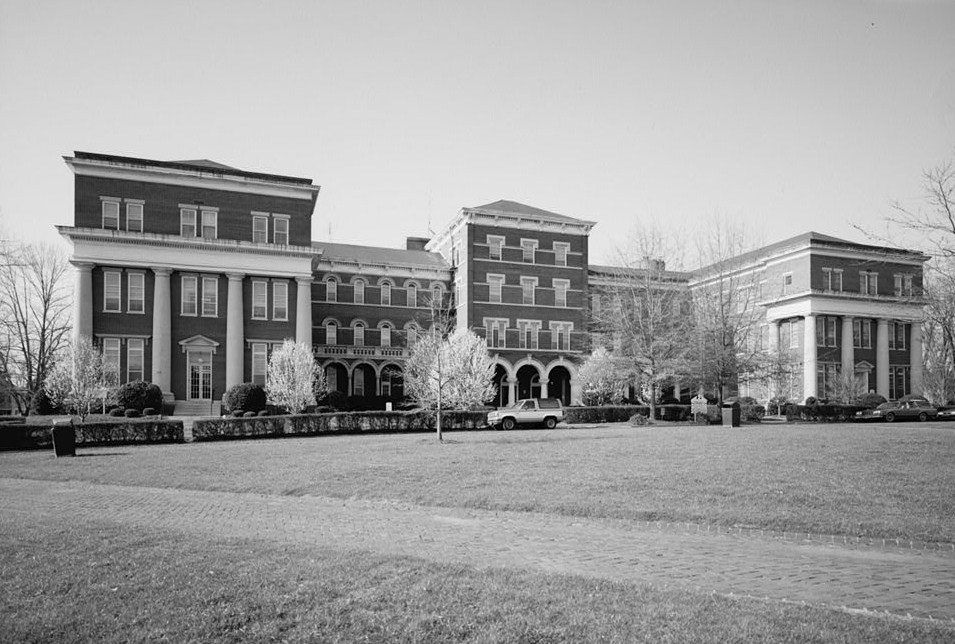
Main Hall, Montevallo

In the early 1890s, residents of Montevallo entered the city in a competition to be selected for the site of the Alabama Girl's Industrial School (later the University of Montevallo) a technical college for white women, raising funds to purchase land and antebellum buildings for the college they won and the college was founded in Montevallo in 1896. Commerce and economic growth increased in Montevallo after the establishment of the college, which was renamed Alabama College in 1919, started admitting men in 1956 and started admitting African Americans in 1968 and became the modern liberal arts University of Montevallo. The university became the main source of commerce in Montevallo and money generated by it was used by the municipal government to build schools. The university also allowed the community some stability during the Great Depression. It quickly took over the coal mine as the major employer in Montevallo, the coal mine closing in 1946.

== Demographics ==
Historical population
Census	Pop.	Note	%±
1880	402		—
1890	572		42.3%
1910	923		—
1920	850		−7.9%
1930	1,245		46.5%
1940	1,490		19.7%
1950	2,150		44.3%
1960	2,755		28.1%
1970	3,719		35.0%
1980	3,965		6.6%
1990	4,239		6.9%
2000	4,825		13.8%
2010	6,323		31.0%
2020	7,229		14.3%
2025 (est.)	7,872	▲	8.9%
U.S. Decennial Census; 2013 Estimate

=== Racial and ethnic composition ===
Montevallo city, Alabama – Racial and ethnic composition Note: the US Census treats Hispanic/Latino as an ethnic category. This table excludes Latinos from the racial categories and assigns them to a separate category. Hispanics/Latinos may be of any race.
Race / Ethnicity (NH = Non-Hispanic)	Pop 2000	Pop 2010	Pop 2020	% 2000	% 2010	% 2020
White alone (NH)	3,438	4,254	4,393	71.25%	67.28%	60.77%
Black or African American alone (NH)	1,249	1,547	1,638	25.89%	24.47%	22.66%
Native American or Alaska Native alone (NH)	18	18	24	0.37%	0.28%	0.33%
Asian alone (NH)	19	39	52	0.39%	0.62%	0.72%
Native Hawaiian or Pacific Islander alone (NH)	0	1	13	0.00%	0.02%	0.18%
Other race alone (NH)	2	6	29	0.04%	0.09%	0.40%
Mixed race or Multiracial (NH)	23	95	310	0.48%	1.50%	4.29%
Hispanic or Latino (any race)	76	363	770	1.58%	5.74%	10.65%
Total	4,825	6,323	7,229	100.00%	100.00%	100.00%

=== 2020 census ===
As of the 2020 census, there were 7,229 people, 2,574 households, and 1,234 families residing in the city. The median age was 27.9 years. 17.5% of residents were under the age of 18 and 13.0% of residents were 65 years of age or older. For every 100 females there were 83.4 males, and for every 100 females age 18 and over there were 79.7 males age 18 and over.

80.0% of residents lived in urban areas, while 20.0% lived in rural areas.

Of all households, 26.5% had children under the age of 18 living in them. 38.9% were married-couple households, 18.9% were households with a male householder and no spouse or partner present, and 34.8% were households with a female householder and no spouse or partner present. About 31.7% of all households were made up of individuals, and 10.5% had someone living alone who was 65 years of age or older.

There were 2,837 housing units, of which 9.3% were vacant. The homeowner vacancy rate was 2.6% and the rental vacancy rate was 8.1%.

=== 2010 census ===
As of the census of 2010, there were 6,323 people, 2,346 households, and 1,325 families residing in the city. The population density was 832.0 inhabitants per square mile (321.2/km^{2}). There were 2,654 housing units at an average density of 349.2 units per square mile (134.8 units/km^{2}). The racial makeup of the city was 70.2% White, 24.6% Black or African American, 0.3% Native American, 0.6% Asian, 0.0% Pacific Islander, 2.5% from other races, and 1.8% from two or more races. 5.7% of the population were Hispanic or Latino of any race.

There were 2,346 households, out of which 24.0% had children under the age of 18 living with them, 39.0% were married couples living together, 13.9% had a female householder with no husband present, and 43.5% were non-families. 31.9% of all households were made up of individuals, and 9.9% had someone living alone who was 65 years of age or older. The average household size was 2.29 and the average family size was 2.94.

In the city, the age distribution of the population shows 17.7% under the age of 18, 29.1% from 18 to 24, 22.4% from 25 to 44, 19.8% from 45 to 64, and 11.0% who were 65 years of age or older. The median age was 27 years. For every 100 females, there were 82.2 males. For every 100 females age 18 and over, there were 79.0 males.

The median income for a household in the city was $40,417, and the median income for a family was $75,500. Males had a median income of $53,125 versus $31,361 for females. The per capita income for the city was $19,741. About 11.8% of families and 20.9% of the population were below the poverty line, including 23.6% of those under age 18 and 7.5% of those age 65 or over.

=== 2000 census ===
As of the census of 2000, there were 4,825 people, 1,711 households, and 946 families residing in the city. The population density was 638.5 inhabitants per square mile (246.5/km^{2}). There were 1,897 housing units at an average density of 251.0 units per square mile (96.9 units/km^{2}). The racial makeup of the city was 72.54% White, 25.89% Black or African American, 0.39% Native American, 0.39% Asian, 0.06% Pacific Islander, 0.15% from other races, and 0.58% from two or more races. 1.58% of the population were Hispanic or Latino of any race.

There were 1,711 households, out of which 25.6% had children under the age of 18 living with them, 37.4% were married couples living together, 15.1% had a female householder with no husband present, and 44.7% were non-families. 30.6% of all households were made up of individuals, and 9.9% had someone living alone who was 65 years of age or older. The average household size was 2.30 and the average family size was 2.96.

In the city, the age distribution of the population shows 18.3% under the age of 18, 36.0% from 18 to 24, 21.8% from 25 to 44, 14.1% from 45 to 64, and 9.8% who were 65 years of age or older. The median age was 23 years. For every 100 females, there were 78.1 males. For every 100 females age 18 and over, there were 72.2 males.

The median income for a household in the city was $30,541, and the median income for a family was $40,164. Males had a median income of $36,222 versus $23,705 for females. The per capita income for the city was $16,468. About 14.5% of families and 24.4% of the population were below the poverty line, including 27.6% of those under age 18 and 21.5% of those age 65 or over.

== Places of interest ==
=== Shoal Creek Park ===
Shoal Creek Park is a historical 167-acre estate that provides a series of walking and biking trails, in addition to a Pavilion, Antebellum style house, known as Perry Hall, and parking lot, located on Highway 119 in Montevallo surrounding Shoal Creek.

Perry Hall was constructed in 1834 on an 800-acre farm owned by the Perry family. The ownership of the house and land were later transferred to the Mahler family in 1946, and later donated to the city of Montevallo in 2013 by Ms. Elizabeth “Betty” Mahler.

=== Orr Park ===
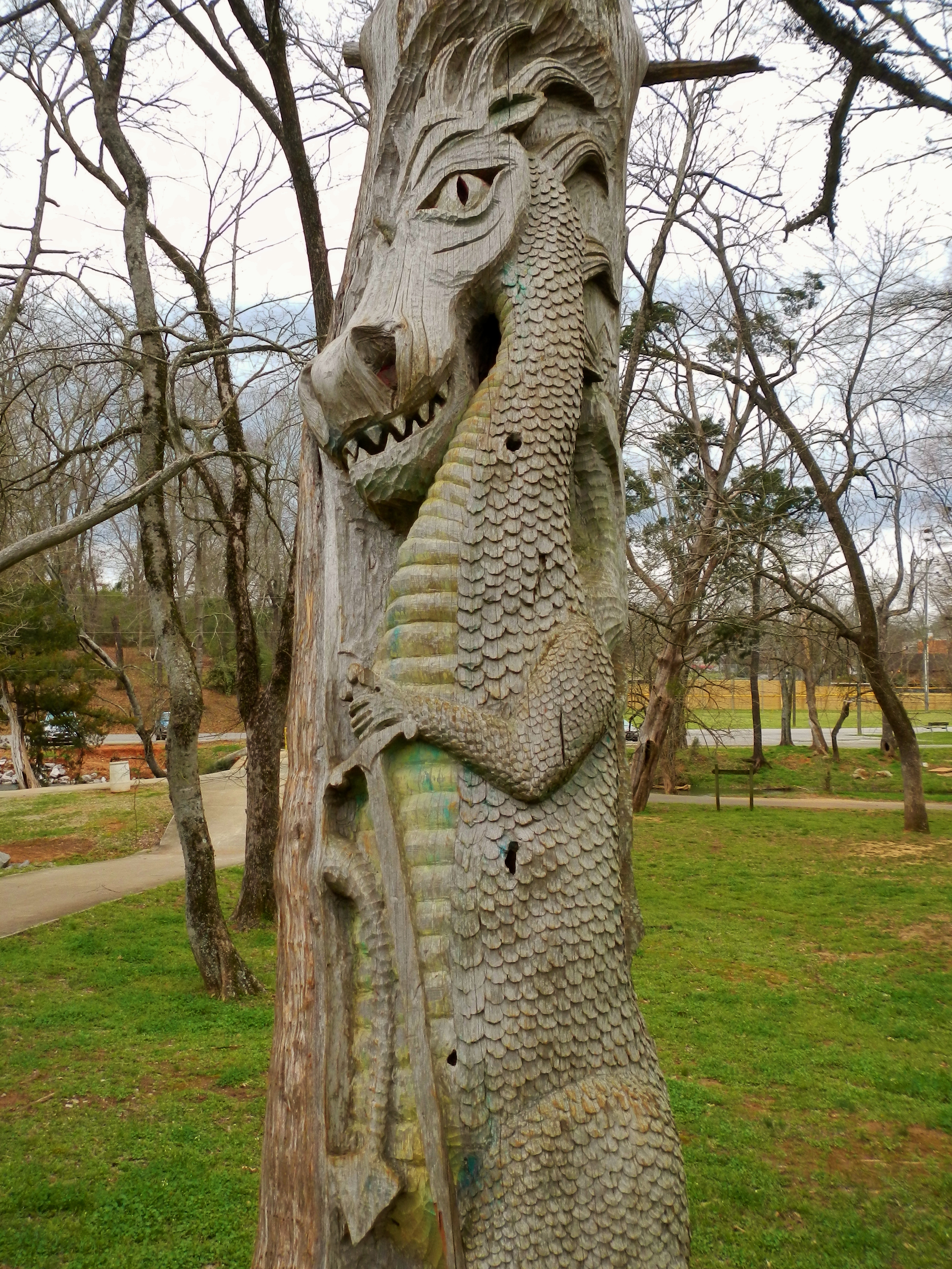
Tim Tingle Tree Carvings in Orr Park

Orr Park, located in Montevallo along Shoal Creek offers residents and visitors a natural recreational environment. Orr Park offers two playgrounds, six baseball/softball fields, a walking trail, a football field and a practice field.

Orr Park contains a local attraction dubbed "Tinglewood". In the early 1990s, local artist Tim Tingle, a coal miner by trade, took it upon himself to transform storm-damaged cedar trees into works of art. The carvings feature gnomes, a dragon, and a fish eating a snake, among others.

=== American Village ===
The American Village is a classroom and American history and civics education center. The American Village serves the Nation as an educational institution whose mission is to strengthen and renew the foundations of American liberty and self-government by engaging and inspiring citizens and leaders, with a special emphasis on programs for young people.

== Notable people ==
- Slade Blackwell, member of the Alabama Senate
- Andrew Jackson Caldwell, U.S. Representative from Tennessee from 1883 to 1887
- James Hardy, surgeon who performed the first successful human lung transplant.
- Jim Hayes, former Major League Baseball player for the Washington Senators
- David Howard Thornton (actor)
- Polly Holliday, actress in TV series such as Alice and movies.
- Frank Ragan King, Commander in the US Navy who was awarded the Distinguished Service Medal
- Burwell Boykin Lewis, former politician and president of the University of Alabama from 1880 to 1885
- Robert M. Lightfoot, Jr., 11th director of NASA Marshall Space Flight Center
- Piano "C" Red, (1933–2013), Chicago blues and boogie-woogie singer and composer
- Eugene Sledge, United States Marine, university professor, and author

== Sister city ==
Echizen Town, Fukui, Japan (since 2008) -- the friendly relationship between Echizen Town and Montevallo began in 1995 with a common interest in pottery. Echizen Town is well known for its unusual pottery and the University of Montevallo excels in teaching and creating the art. Echizen Town is also well known in Japan for its high quality crab, rice, and daffodils. Many people often confuse Echizen Town with Echizen City, a larger city to the south of Echizen Town, known for its production of knives and paper.

== Gallery ==
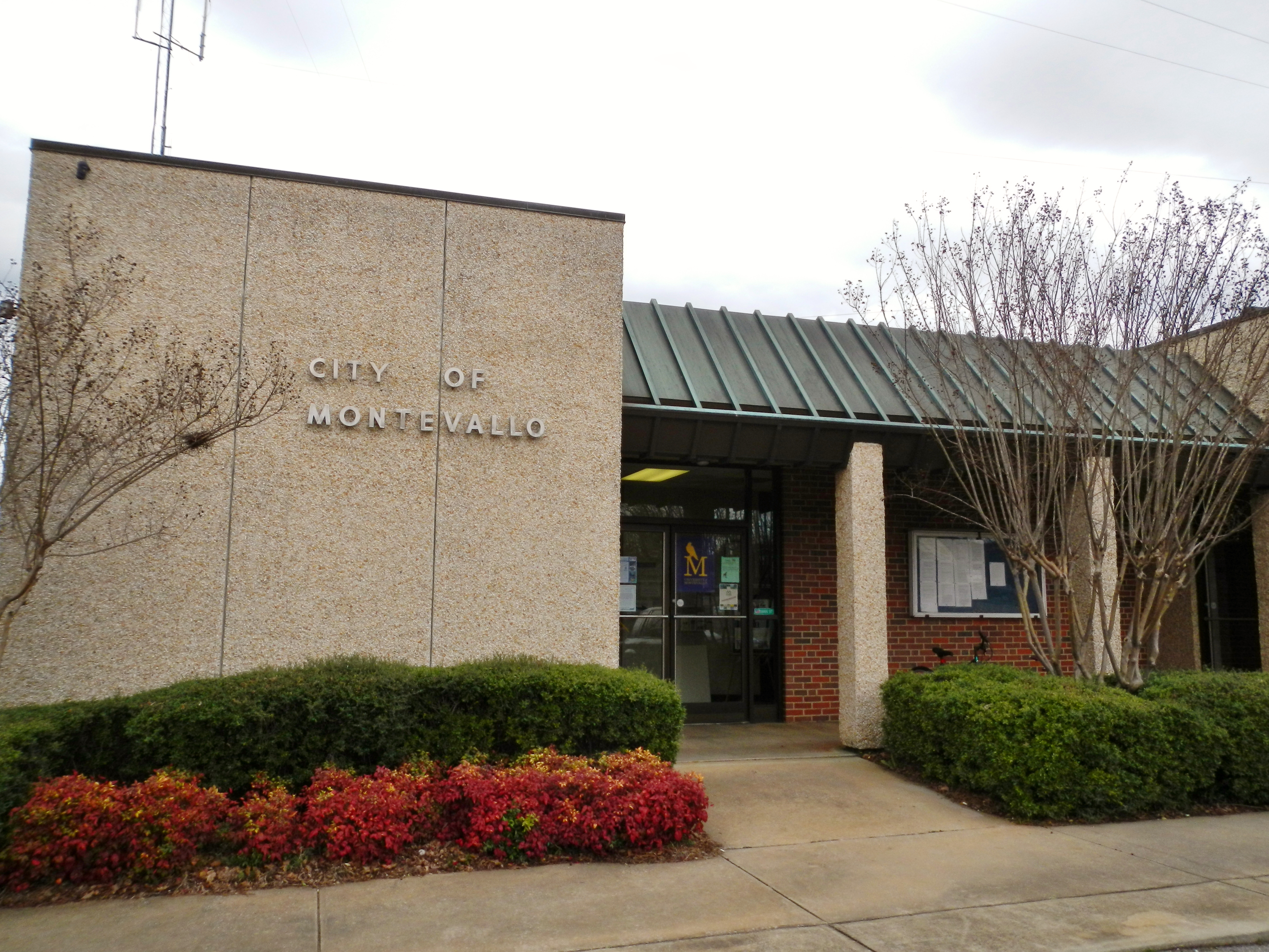
Montevallo City Hall

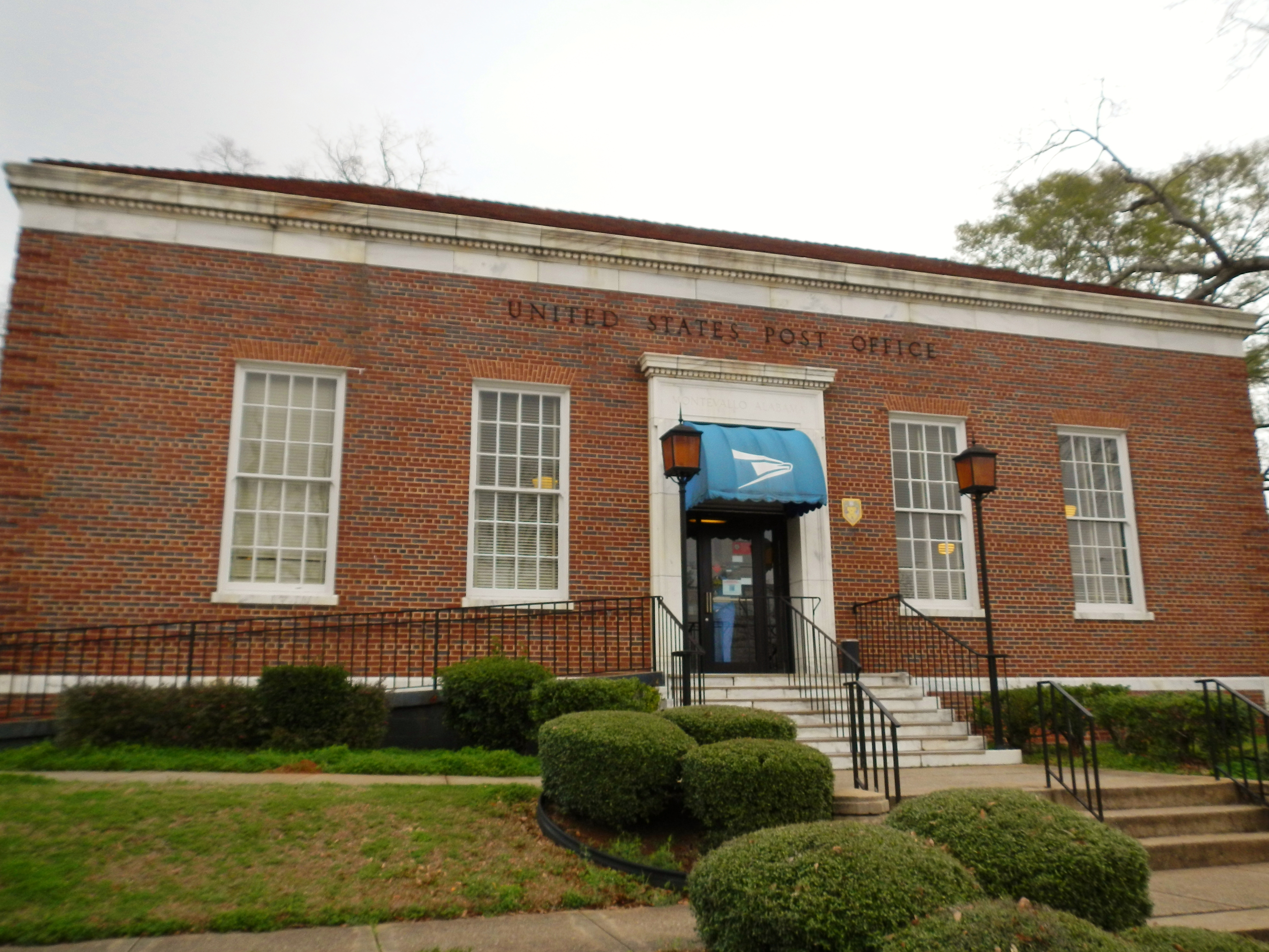
Montevallo Post Office (ZIP code: 35115)

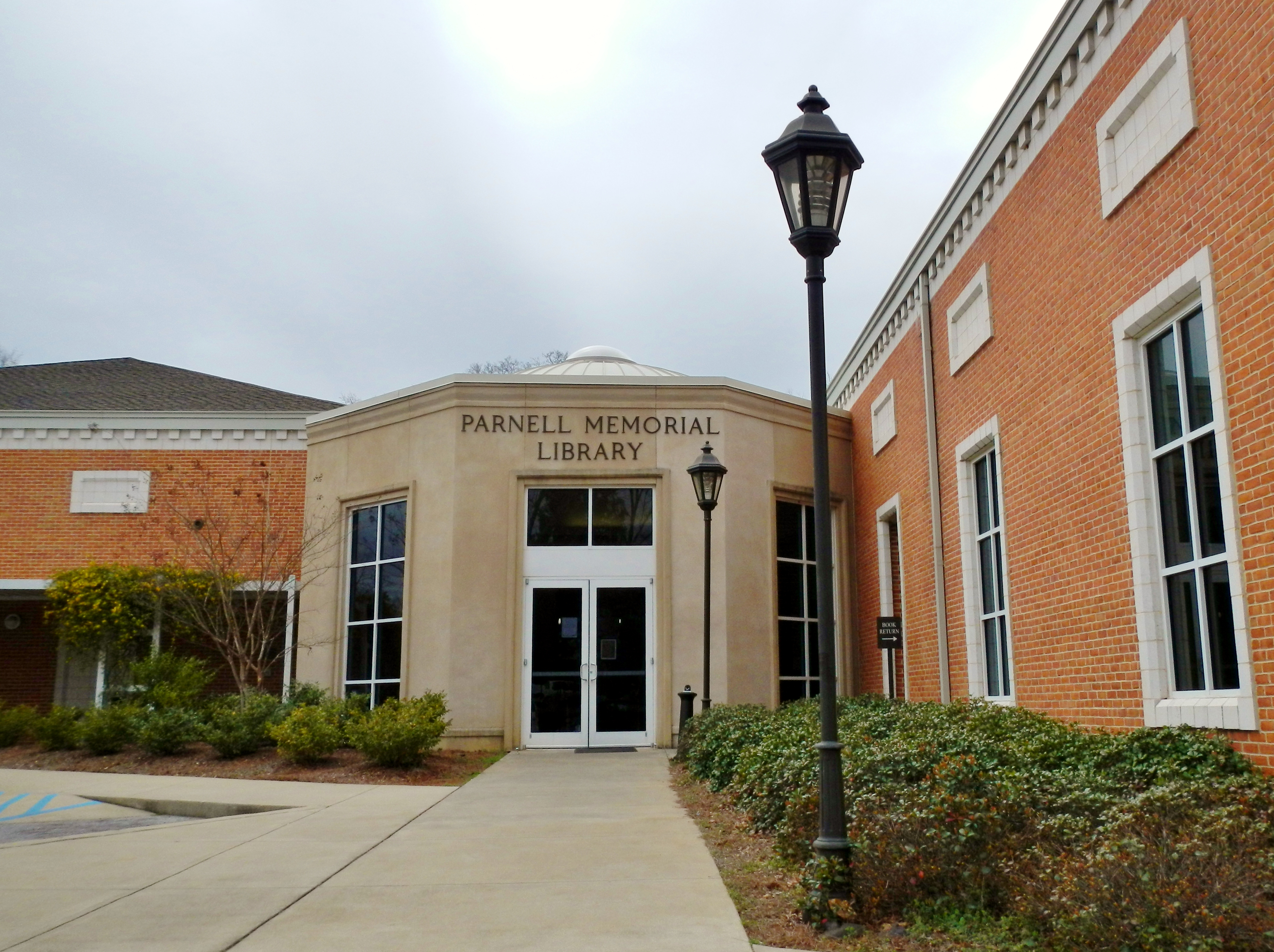
Parnell Memorial Library

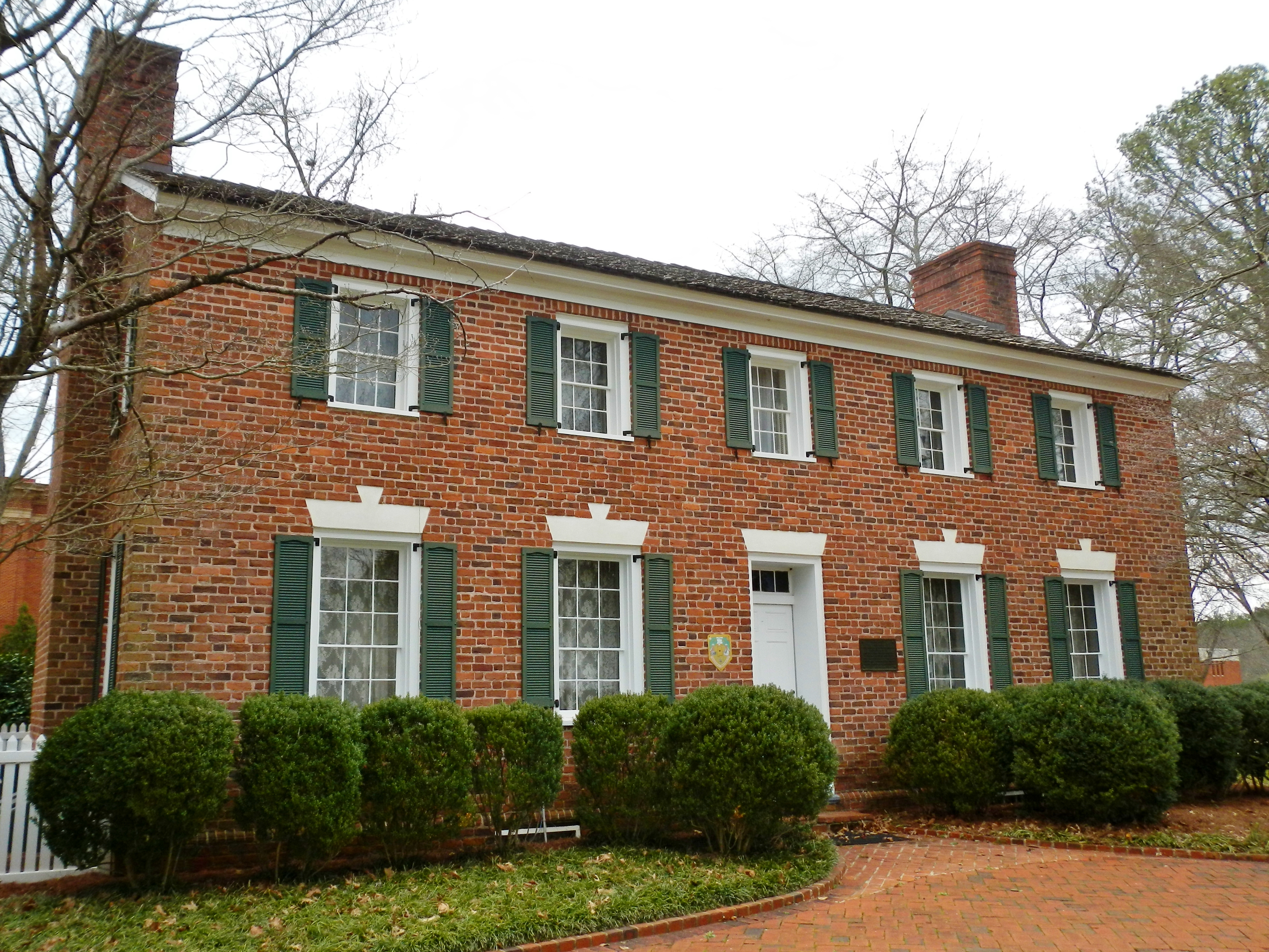
Built in the Federal style in 1823, the King House is the oldest building on the campus of the University of Montevallo. It was added to the National Register of Historic Places on January 14, 1972.

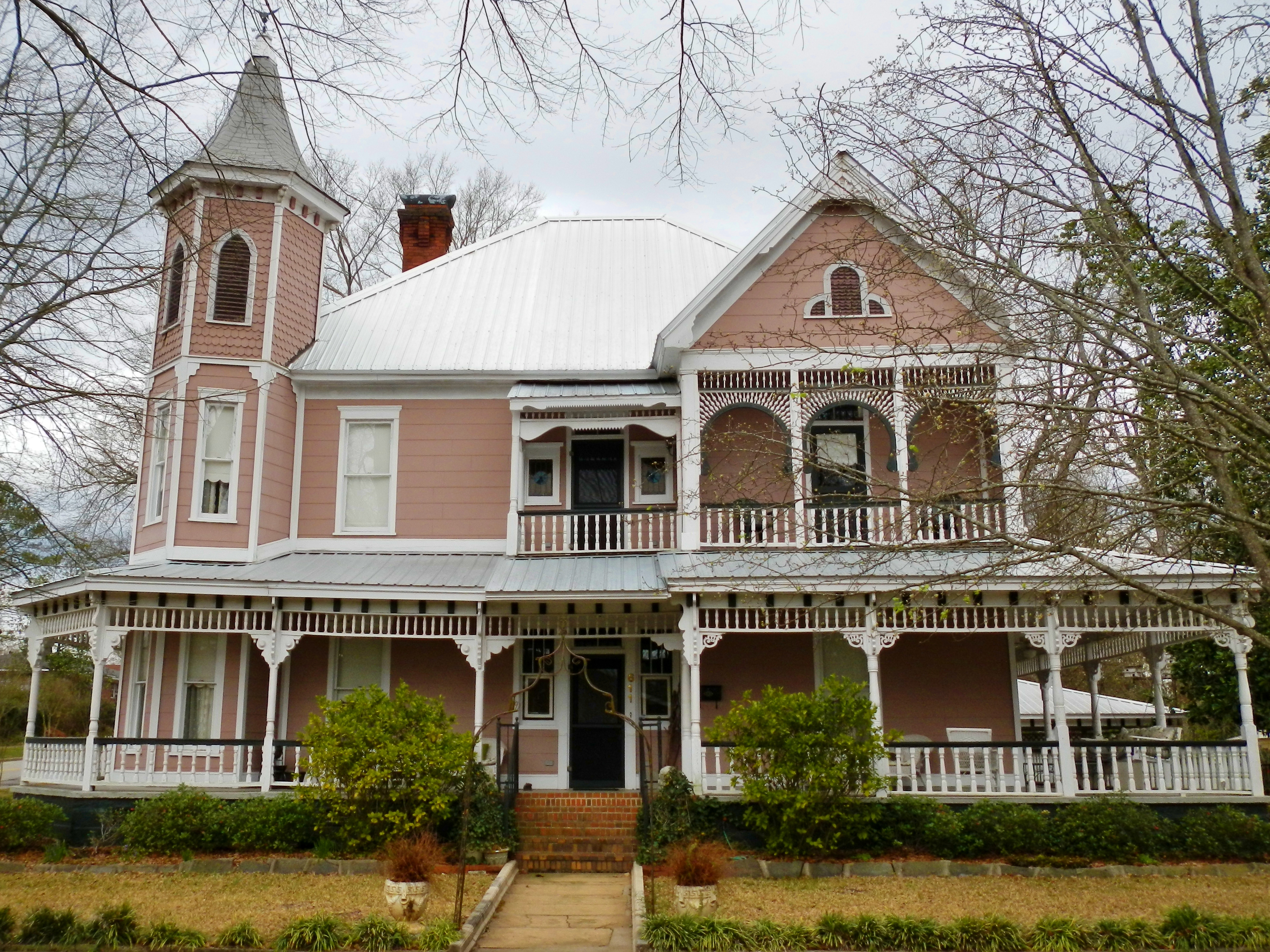
Built in 1900, the McKibbon House is a historic Victorian home located in Montevallo. The home is now a private residence. It was added to the National Register of Historic Places on December 31, 2001.

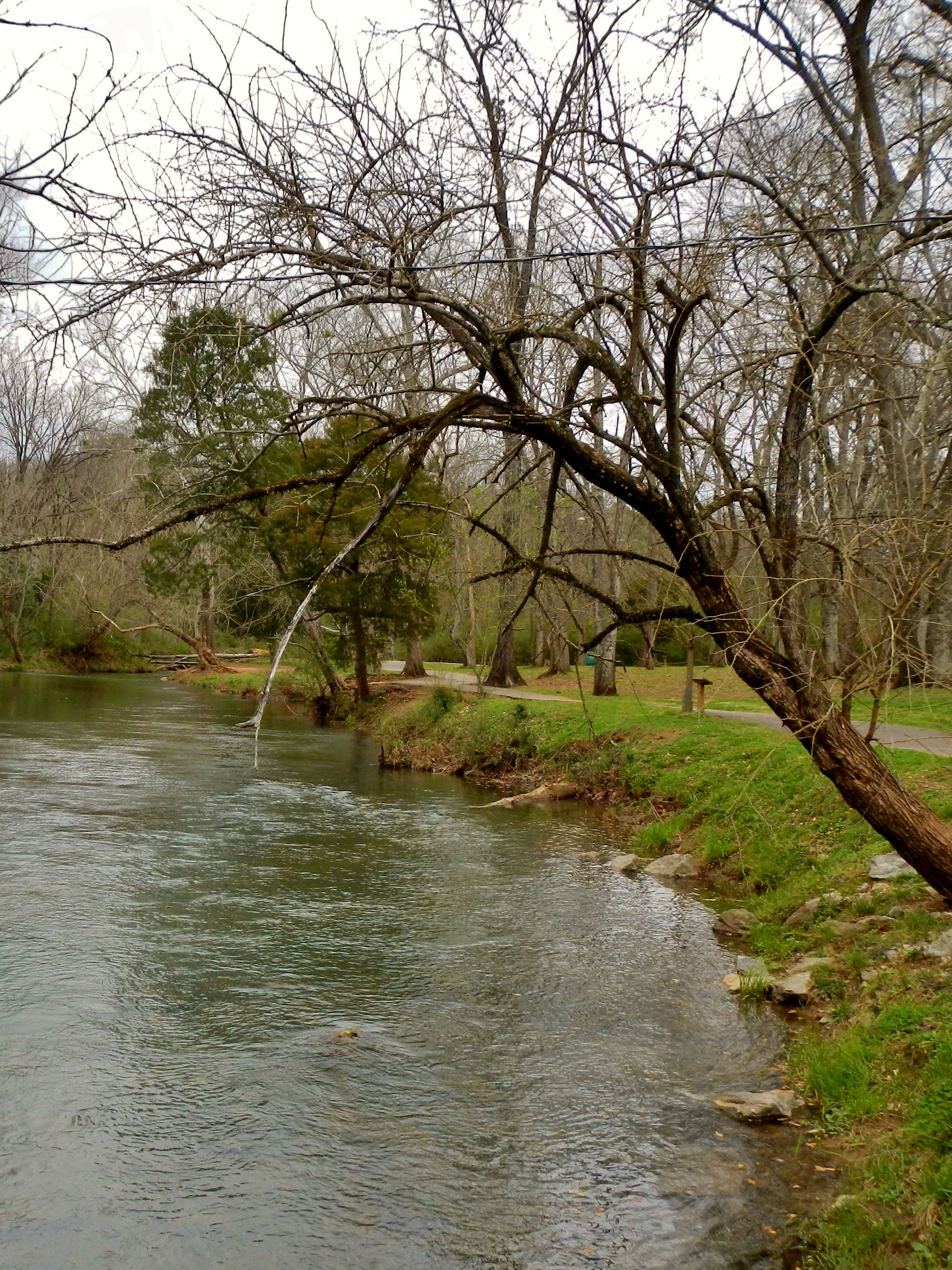
Shoal Creek at Orr Park in Montevallo.

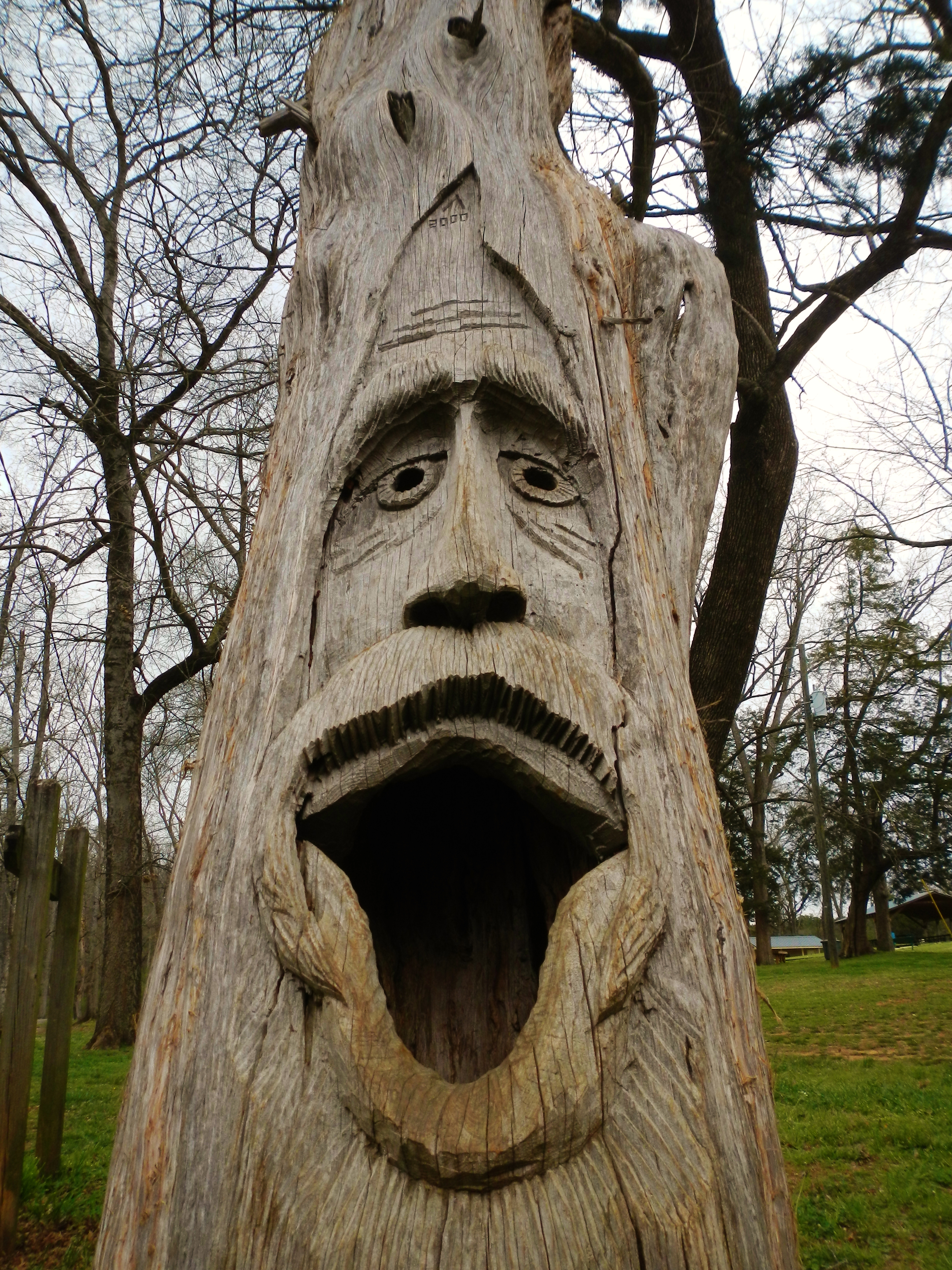
Tim Tingle's carving of a man's face in the trees at Orr Park.
