= Piano "C" Red =

- Also known as: James Cecil Wheeler
- Born: Cecil Fain; September 14, 1933; Montevallo, Alabama, U.S.
- Died: June 3, 2013 (aged 79) Chicago, Illinois, U.S.
- Genres: Chicago blues, boogie-woogie
- Occupations: Pianist, singer, composer
- Instrument: Piano
- Years active: 1949–2000s

Cecil Fain (September 14, 1933 – June 3, 2013), known professionally as Piano "C" Red was an American Chicago blues and boogie-woogie pianist, singer and composer.

== Life and career ==
He was born in Montevallo, Alabama, United States. Inspired by a spiritual singing mother, he was tutored by a local pianist, Fat Lily, who needed the incentive of bottles of moonshine whiskey. By the age of 12, Fain had learned the rudiments of blues and boogie-woogie piano playing, before he relocated to Atlanta, Georgia, four years later. There he started playing the piano semi-professionally, billed as James Wheeler. While he was performing there he acquired the name 'Red', in view of the red suit he wore on stage. He then added the "C" to differentiate himself from another Georgian pianist, Piano Red. He moved again in 1956, this time to Chicago, Illinois, where he remained for the rest of his life. He played with the Count Basie Band at Chicago's High Chaparral club and had a regular spot performing at Joe Chamble's Club. However the income was insufficient to sustain him and Piano "C" Red became a taxicab driver by day and performed at night time.

He was a regular performer on Maxwell Street, and by the early 1960s, Red had sat in with musicians including Elmore James, Eddie Taylor, Jimmy Rogers, Hound Dog Taylor and Sonny Boy Williams. Red had a short recording career in 1963 with Chess Records, who issued versions of "Slow Down and Cool It" and "Hundred and Two". Despite this, unlike many of his acquaintance, Red never had a full-time recording contract. Nevertheless, as well as Chess, Red ultimately had work released on Sound, Dawn, Big Boy, New Rose Records and Boogie On The Boogie. His regular daytime employment inspired his most successful recording, "Cab Driving Man", which he also used as the title of his 1999 album. Red often performed on Maxwell Street with his longstanding backing ensemble, the Flat Foot Boogie Men. When the area was threatened with redevelopment, Red was foremost in the campaign to preserve the area and its blues heritage. Although unsuccessful, Red and his band continued to play in and around the site, as well as in Chicago blues clubs.

During his time, Red played accompaniment to Muddy Waters, Memphis Slim, B.B. King, Koko Taylor, Buddy Guy, Little Walter, Junior Wells, and Fats Domino. By the 1990s, Red's name had spread beyond just Chicago. His debut album was released in 1992 on New Rose Records. The collection titled, Piano "C" Red, included his regularly played song, "Flat Foot Boogie". He was featured in the June 1996 issue of Living Blues, and interviewed by Niles Frantz from WBEZ's Eight Forty-Eight program. In 1999, Red released a CD entitled Cab Driving Man, on Boogie On The Boogie. Red continued to lead his Flat Foot Boogie band, playing in and around the Chicago scene.

On March 23, 2006, Red and a friend parked at a gas station in South Holland, Illinois, where two men demanded the keys to his 1994 model Chevrolet automobile. After Red yelled, "Police!", one of the two shot him in the spine, leaving Red paralysed. Not long after the shooting, his former employer, Simon Garber of Chicago Carriage Cab Co., donated a refurbished taxi with wheelchair accessibility aimed to transport Red, his band and musical instruments. The comeback did not materialise, although Red did make the occasional appearance, such as a side-stage performance at the Chicago Blues Festival. His health progressively worsened, ending his performances. Red spent his final years moving from one nursing home to another.

Piano "C" Red died on June 3, 2013, at the age of 79. In 2020 the Killer Blues Headstone Project placed a headstone at Mt. Hope Cemetery in Chicago.

== Discography ==
=== Albums ===
Year	Title	Record label
1992	Piano "C" Red	New Rose Records
1999	Cab Driving Man	Boogie On The Boogie

== See also ==
- List of boogie woogie musicians
