= James Crutchfield =

American blues singer (1912–2001)

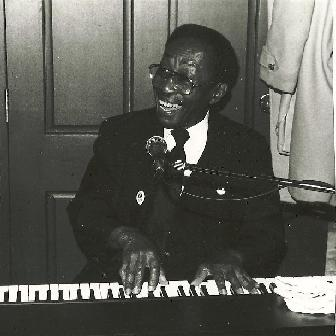
- James Crutchfield – St. Louis 1992

Background information
- Born: May 25, 1912; Baton Rouge, Louisiana, United States
- Died: December 7, 2001 (aged 89) St. Louis, Missouri, United States
- Genres: Blues, Boogie-Woogie
- Occupation: Musician
- Instrument(s): Vocal, Piano
- Years active: 1920s–2001

James Crutchfield (May 25, 1912 – December 7, 2001) was a St. Louis barrelhouse blues singer, piano player and songwriter whose career spanned seven decades. His repertoire consisted of original and classic blues and boogie-woogie and Depression-era popular songs.

Known as the "King of Barrelhouse Blues", his better-known songs include "I Believe You Need a Shot" and "My Baby Cooks My Breakfast".

== Childhood ==
There is no record of James Crutchfield's birth: "My mama never know'd what day it was, she never know'd what month it was, but she always know'd what year it was. 'Lotta folks back in them days never even know'd that much, but my mama always did. She told me I was born in '12, in Baton Rouge, when the high water was highest." Crutchfield said his mother, Sarah, was a "Geechee", a descendant of slaves of the Georgia/Carolina sea islands, and said he much resembled her. His father, Tom Crutchfield, he described as a large copper-colored man from southwestern Mississippi, whom he had never met until he was eight years old and with whom he maintained a cordial relationship thereafter. An only child, James and his mother, a farm worker, migrated through Louisiana and East Texas with the cotton and sugarcane seasons, moving often and sometimes living in tents. His earliest memories were of the "boys" coming home from World War I and the silent-movie Westerns of William S. Hart, whom he idolized.

Around 1920, his mother married and settled in Bogalusa, Louisiana. In his early teens, while employed as the janitor in a theater, Crutchfield began to teach himself to play on the house piano. Also around this time, curious about the exact day of his birth, he went to the Baton Rouge library and told the story his mother had told him to an intrigued librarian. Together they looked through the 1912 newspapers and found that indeed, there had been a flood then, which crested on May 25. From that time on, he regarded that date as his birthday.

In 1927, working as an underage employee for a local railroad, Crutchfield lost his left leg below the knee in a coupling accident. The railroad settled out of court for twenty thousand dollars. Part of the money was used to buy his mother a house in Baton Rouge; the rest, with his now diminished opportunities for employment, was used to subsidize his fledgling musical career.

== Career ==
By the end of the 1920s, Crutchfield had begun traveling a rough-and-tumble circuit of Louisiana lumber camps, Mississippi levee camps and East Texas juke joints, performing as the M & O Kid in deference to his mentor, the Mississippi barrelhouse bluesman M & O, whom Crutchfield in later years said was the best he ever heard. The establishments that served the lumber and levee camps typically stayed open all day and night and provided food, drink and lodging for two piano players, who each played a 12-hour shift for tips. Competition for these jobs was cut-throat, and Crutchfield developed his lifelong habit of playing for hours without a break, out of fear that somebody better would sit down and play in his absence and steal his job – which evidently had happened.

Another early influence was Papa Lord God, a Texan: "Oh Papa Lord God, he was bad, man, he was baaad!" Little Brother Montgomery showed him "44 Blues" when the Montgomery brothers performed in Bogalusa, and he traded techniques in after-hours sessions with Champion Jack Dupree when they played at rival nightclubs on the same street in Baton Rouge, early in their careers. Crutchfield worked as accompanist to Joe Pullum in the early 1930s and performed with him in Texas and Louisiana, occasionally hopping freight trains for transportation. He was to play Pullum's hit "Black Gal" for the rest of his life. Shortly after the end of World War II, Crutchfield performed in Mississippi with Elmore James and Boyd Gilmore "in places like Goodman or out in the country."

In 1948, Crutchfield moved to St. Louis, Missouri, a city with a venerable blues piano tradition dating back to the ragtime era. He worked in the Gaslight Square entertainment district at various venues, including a decade-long residency at "Miss Rosalee's" Left Bank. In 1955, Crutchfield was appearing with Bat the Hummingbird (drums) at a bar located at 2220 Market Street that was formerly Tom Turpin's Rosebud Saloon, where Scott Joplin had performed half a century earlier. He was found there by Bob Koester, on a tip from police detective Charlie O'Brien, and recorded a few days later, along with Speckled Red, by Ralph and Ethel Hiatt. Several of the songs were eventually released in the Barrelhouse Blues and Stomps anthology series on the Euphonic label. Six selections are included on the compilation album Biddle Street Barrelhousin', released in 2000 by Delmark Records.

The decline of Gaslight Square in the late 1960s was also the decline of Crutchfield's music career. He was professionally inactive in the 1970s and worked as a cook at the State Hospital for a number of years. In the early 1980s he was collecting and selling junk tires and running an illegal gambling operation.

== Rediscovery ==
In 1981, Swingmaster, a new Dutch record label, was interested in recording any of the old-time St. Louis barrelhouse piano players that might still be alive. They contacted the same Charlie O'Brien who had been instrumental in locating Crutchfield a quarter-century earlier, and he reported that Crutchfield was still around and in fine form. Swingmaster visited St. Louis that year, but had no luck finding him. They returned in 1983, and this time, with the assistance of bluesman Henry Townsend, they were successful. Crutchfield traveled to Groningen, Netherlands, later that year and recorded the album Original Barrelhouse Blues, which was re-released on CD in 2001 as St. Louis Blues Piano. A tour included performances in Belgium, France, Germany and several venues in the Netherlands, notably the concerthall Vredenburg in Utrecht, which he later said was the largest crowd he had ever played for.

Back in St. Louis, local impresario Mark O'Shaughnessy guided Crutchfield's comeback and introduced him to the contemporary blues scene. He received a publicity boost when he was selected as the first recipient of the Lillian Carter Award for Outstanding Senior Citizen in 1984. Crutchfield and his wife Ernestine moved to the Soulard neighborhood, an area known for its many nightclubs. He played weekly at Broadway Oyster Bar, 1860 Saloon and Mike & Min's, among other engagements. In the late 1980s, Crutchfield was regularly performing with a backup group consisting of Guitar Frank, Papa John (washtub bass) and Rosceaux (washboard). He played the 1988 St. Louis Blues Festival at the Jefferson Memorial in Forest Park, appeared every weekend at Allen Avenue, and began playing every Wednesday night for the next 12 years at Venice Cafe, where many of St. Louis' top blues and jazz musicians would often sit in.

In the early 1990s, Crutchfield replaced the "tub" and "rub-board" with Sharon Foehner (bass) and Bill Howell (drums) and added Andy Millner (harmonica). In addition to weekly engagements, one-nighters, parties and weddings, he appeared at the 1993 St. Louis Blues Festival on the riverfront, Harp Attack at Mississippi Nights, and the Casa Loma Ballroom. A well-known and popular character around the neighborhood, his annual birthday celebration at Molly's heralded the beginning of the summer beer garden season in Soulard. Crutchfield appeared at the 1997 St. Louis Blues Heritage Festival and continued working regularly, performing with local rock & roll pioneer Bennie Smith and the Urban Blues Express in his last years.

James Crutchfield died of complications of heart disease on December 7, 2001, in St. Louis, almost the last bluesman of his era. An impromptu parade through the streets of Soulard was held in his honor.

In 2014, the Killer Blues Headstone Project placed a headstone for Crutchfield at Lake Charles Cemetery in Bel-Nor, Saint Louis County, Missouri.

== Discography ==
- Barrelhouse Blues And Stomps: Vol. 4, Various Artists, Euphonic ESR-1204 (1957)

Levee Blues

- Barrelhouse Blues And Stomps: Vol. 5, Various Artists, Euphonic ESR-1205 (1967)

Black Woman / How Long Blues

- Original Barrelhouse Blues, Swingmaster 2109 (1985)

Piggly Wiggly Blues / Pearly Mae / I Believe You Need A Shot / Forty-Four Blues / Bogalusa Blues / My Baby Cooks My Breakfast / Black Woman / U.S.- Russian Blues / Barrelhouse Blues / My Little Lucille

- Biddle Street Barrelhousin', Various Artists, Delmark DE-739 (2000)

Levee Blues / Blow North Wind / How Long Blues / Black Gal / Ora Nelle Blues / Pearly Mae Blues

- St. Louis Blues Piano, Swingmaster CD 2205 (2001)

CD reissue of Original Barrelhouse Blues, Swingmaster 2109

- The Story Of Piano Blues: From The Country To The City, Various Artists, Wolf CD 120106 (2013)

Sittin' On Top Of The World

- Another Friend Like Me, Various Artists, Document DOCD 32-20-19 (2013)

Sittin' On Top Of The World / Peetie Wheatstraw Blues
