= William Ezell =

American songwriter

- Also known as: Will Ezell
- Born: December 23, 1892; Brenham, Texas, U.S.
- Died: August 2, 1963 (aged 70) Chicago, Illinois, U.S.
- Genres: Blues; jazz; ragtime; boogie-woogie
- Occupations: Pianist; singer-songwriter
- Instrument: Piano
- Years active: 1910s–1940s
- Label: Paramount

William Ezell (December 23, 1892 – August 2, 1963), was an American blues, jazz, ragtime and boogie-woogie pianist and occasional singer, who was also billed as Will Ezell. He regularly contributed to recordings made by Paramount Records in the late 1920s and early 1930s. Ezell was noted by the music journalist Bruce Eder as "a technically brilliant pianist, showing the strong influence of jazz as well as blues in his work".

Ezell's "Pitchin' Boogie" and Cow Cow Davenport's "Cow Cow Blues" were amongst the earliest boogie-woogie recordings. However, Pinetop Smith's "Pinetop's Boogie Woogie" was the first to use the phrase in the title of a song.

Two of Ezell's more notable solo recordings, "Heifer Dust" and "Barrel House Woman" (both 1929), have been noted for containing "elements of both blues and barrelhouse boogie-woogie in their form".

== Biography ==
Ezell was born in Brenham, Texas, United States, (Note: There has been speculation and supposition concerning details of Ezell's birth. Bill Edwards noted, "While Fullerton, Louisiana has been cited, this singular reference comes from a 1972 conversation with blues guitarist Jesse Thomas, who included that information in a sentence about Ezell. Thomas was at least 15 years younger, and did not meet Ezell until late in Will's career. There is another reference to him being from East Texas in the same published source. Such conflicting information has to logically lean more towards concrete findings than word of mouth, so any origin of Ezell that suggests a Louisiana birthplace and upbringing is very suspect. Both a 1917 and 1942 draft record appear to provide the most correct information and initial lead on Ezell, citations of which were not found in any other source while researching this article. However, the author's findings were directly in line with research done by Alex van der Tuuk in 2003".) one of six children to Lorenza Ezell, a farm laborer, and his wife Rachel. According to the 1900 United States census, the family were still living in Brenham. The same source showed that Ezell's mother had died at some point between 1901 and 1910. Ezell found loose employment as a barrelhouse pianist and, by 1917, had relocated to New Orleans, Louisiana, according to his draft record, and was working as a self-employed musician. There is no evidence that Ezell was conscripted at any time. He continued his itinerant work, finding employment at riverside sawmill camps in Louisiana and East Texas.

By the early 1920s, Ezell was working with the blues singer Elzadie Robinson. Around 1925, Ezell moved to Chicago, Illinois, and made friends with Blind Blake and Charlie Spand. Ezell, along with others such as Spand, was one of the boogie-woogie pianists who, in the 1920s, performed on Brady Street and Hastings Street in Detroit, Michigan. By 1926, Ezell started work for Paramount in Chicago, as they provided regular work for black musicians, which was not always available elsewhere. There is some doubt as to his first recording, but he wrote "Sawmill Blues", which was recorded by Elzadie Robinson (under the pseudonym of Bernice Drake) in October that year. His flexibility in playing differing styles proved popular, and one of his earliest duties was accompanying Lucille Bogan on "Sweet Petunia", a song full of Bogan's trademark double entendres. There is evidence that Ezell and Bogan's relationship went beyond the recording studio, to the extent that Bogan's husband considered divorce proceedings.

During 1927, Ezell's status at Paramount grew, and he operated under the stewardship of Aletha Dickerson, who had replaced J. Mayo Williams as the head of Paramount's Chicago operations. As well as being an accompanist, arranger, and part-producer for other musicians, Ezell recorded his own material for the label between 1928 and 1929. These tracks included his two best-known recordings, "Mixed Up Rag" and "Heifer Dust". Ezell's playing style was similar to that of Jimmy Blythe. However, he was a popular musician who was warmly recalled by Little Brother Montgomery, who had a similar route to notability. Over his time with Paramount, Ezell's own recordings and his association with Charlie Spand, Baby James and Blind Roosevelt Graves, were amongst the highest quality ever issued by that label, which earlier had a reputation for substandard recordings.

In addition to his musical input, Ezell's duties with Paramount were far reaching. In December 1929, he escorted the body of Blind Lemon Jefferson, who had been one of the label's best selling artists, by railroad back to Jefferson's homeland of Texas for burial. His musical input at Paramount ceased in early 1930, except for his accompaniment of Slim Tarpley on two sides in 1931. Paramount Records was rapidly declining as the effects of the Great Depression began to be felt, and later that year Ezell was back to playing in Louisiana, accompanying Clarence Hall. Ezell's whereabouts in the later 1930s are largely unknown, but the researcher John Steiner noted that Cripple Clarence Lofton, who owned a club in Chicago, hosted on stage Ezell, Spand, Leroy Garnett and others through the end of World War II. Records indicate that Ezell continued to be based in Chicago during this time. He worked at their Crane Technical School, operated as part of the New Deal laws, although whether he was employed as an instructor or a maintenance worker is not certain.

Ezell died in Chicago in 1963 in Chicago, at the age of 70. His death was not reported in any newspaper obituaries. In 2018 the Killer Blues Headstone Project placed the headstone for Will Ezell at Restvale Cemetery in Alsip, Illinois.

In 1992, Document Records issued a compilation album containing 23 tracks he recorded during his time with Paramount, from February 1927 to January 1931.

== Discography ==
=== Known recordings ===
Year	Song title	Accreditation	Paramount Records catalog reference
1926	"Barrel House Man"	Elzadie Robinson	P3053
1926	"Sawmill Blues" (composer credits only)	Elzadie Robinson (billed as Bernice Drake)	P3054
1927	"Stormy Hailing Blues"	Marie Bradley	P4219
1927	"Sweet Petunia"	Lucille Bogan	P4309
1927	"Levee Blues"	Lucille Bogan	P4324
1927	"Jailhouse Moan"	Ora Brown	P4563
1927	"Restless Blues"	Ora Brown	P4564
1927	"Whiskey Blues"	Elzadie Robinson	P4667
1927	"Black Bordered Letter Blues"	Bertha Henderson	4680
1927	"Six Thirty Blues"	Bertha Henderson	P4681
1927	"Bunker Hill Blues"	Sally Duffie (possibly a pseudonym for Ezell)	P4728
1927	"West Coast Rag"	Blind Blake	P4787
1927	"Tick Tock Blues"	Elzadie Robinson	20067
1927	"Hour Behind the Gun"	Elzadie Robinson	20068
1928	"Old Mill Blues"	William Ezell	20823
1928	"Mixed Up Rag"	William Ezell	20824
1928	"Ezell's Precious Five"	William Ezell	21065
1928	"Crawlin' Spider Blues"	William Ezell	21066
1929	"Barrel House Woman"	William Ezell	21143
1929	"Bucket of Blood"	William Ezell	21144
1929	"Heifer Dust"	William Ezell	21145
1929	"Playing the Dozen"	William Ezell	21146
1929	"This Is Your Last Night With Me"	Elzadie Robinson	21186
1929	"Cheatin' Daddy"	Elzadie Robinson	21187
1929	"My Pullman Porter Man"	Elzadie Robinson	21190
1929	"Just Can't Stay Here"	Blind Roosevelt Graves / Baby James	G15649
1929	"Pitchin' Boogie"	Blind Roosevelt Graves / Baby James	G15650
1929	"Freakish Mistreater Blues"	William Ezell	G15654
1929	"Hot Spot Stuff"	William Ezell	G15655
1929	"Hometown Skiffle Part One: Mixed Up Rag"	Paramount All Stars	21453
1931	"Try Some of That"	Slim Tarpley	L0733
1931	"Alabama Hustler"	Slim Tarpley	L0734

=== Compilation album ===
Year	Album title	Record label
1985	Pitchin' Boogie - Complete Recordings 1927–1929	Oldie Blues
1992	Complete Recorded Works (1927–31)	Document

== See also ==
- List of blues musicians
- List of boogie woogie musicians
- List of ragtime musicians
