= Gene Mayl =

American jazz musician

Gene Mayl (December 30, 1928 – May 5, 2015) was an American jazz double-bassist, tubaist, and vocalist.

== Career ==
Mayl was born in Dayton, Ohio, United States.

Mayl lived in France after World War II, where he worked with Claude Bolling, Don Byas, and Claude Luter. In 1948, he formed his own Dixieland revival ensemble, the Dixieland Rhythm Kings, which recorded for London Records and Riverside Records, and was active through the mid-1970s. Among those he worked with in this group were Speckled Red and Terry Waldo. Mayl worked extensively with George Brunis in the 1960s and 1970s, and also worked with Wild Bill Davison, Billy Maxted, Bob Scobey, and Muggsy Spanier.

Gene Mayl died on May 5, 2015, in Harrison Township, Ohio.
