= Tom Rigney =

American musician

Tom Rigney is an American, San Francisco Bay Area musician, specializing in Zydeco and Cajun music. He is an electric violinist and Cajun fiddler.

He is the leader of the American roots music band, Tom Rigney and Flambeau.

In February 2004, his music was featured in the Alameda Civic Ballet production of Fiestive Les Bons Temps (The Good Times) at the Alameda Education Foundation Mardi Gras Gala.

== Discography ==
- Chasing the Devil (1997)
