= Cripple Clarence Lofton =

American musical artist (1896/1897–1957)

Background information
- Born: Albert or Clarence Clemens; March 28, 1887 or 1897; Kingsport or Burns, Tennessee, United States
- Died: January 9, 1957 (age 59–69) Chicago, Illinois, United States
- Genres: Blues, boogie-woogie, twelve-bar blues
- Occupations: Musician, songwriter, tap dancer
- Instruments: Vocals, piano
- Labels: Vocalion, Document

Clarence Lofton (March 28, 1887, 1896 or 1897 – January 9, 1957), credited as Cripple Clarence Lofton, was an American boogie-woogie pianist and singer born in Tennessee.

== Life and career ==
There is uncertainty over when and where he was born. Many sources state that he was born Albert Clemens in 1887, in Kingsport, Tennessee. However, the researchers Bob Eagle and Eric LeBlanc state that, based on information in official records, he was born Clarence Clemens in 1896 or 1897, in Burns, Tennessee, and may have been adopted as Clarence Ramsey. They also concluded that Albert (or Elbert) Clemens, born c. 1903, who was also a singer and pianist who recorded for Bluebird Records, was his brother.

Lofton was born with a limp, from which he derived his stage name, but he began his career as a tap dancer. He then began performing in the blues idiom known as boogie-woogie and settled in Chicago, Illinois. The distinctive feature of his performances was his energetic stage presence; he would dance and whistle as well as sing. A description of Lofton in performance is provided by William Russell, in his essay "Boogie Woogie":

No one can complain of Clarence's lack of variety or versatility. When he really gets going he's a three-ring circus. During one number, he plays, sings, whistles a chorus, and snaps his fingers with the technique of a Spanish dancer to give further percussive accompaniment to his blues. At times he turns sideways, almost with his back to the piano as he keeps pounding away at the keyboard and stomping his feet, meanwhile continuing to sing and shout at his audience or his drummer. Suddenly in the middle of a number he jumps up, his hands clasped in front of him, and walks around the piano stool, and then, unexpectedly, out booms a vocal break in a bass voice from somewhere. One second later, he has turned and is back at the keyboard, both hands flying at lightning-like pace. His actions and facial expressions are as intensely dramatic and exciting as his music."

With his performance style, Lofton became a mainstay in his genre. His first recording was made in April 1935 for Vocalion Records with guitar accompaniment by Big Bill Broonzy. Lofton also accompanied Red Nelson on several sides for Decca Records in 1935 and 1936. He later owned the Big Apple nightclub in Chicago and continued to record into the late 1940s, when he retired.

Lofton lived in Chicago for the rest of his life. He died of a blood clot in his brain in Cook County Hospital in 1957. In 2014 the Killer Blues Headstone Project placed a headstone for Clarence Lofton at Restvale Cemetery in Alsip, Illinois.

== Influence ==
Lofton was an integral figure in the boogie-woogie genre in Chicago. Some of his more popular songs include "Strut That Thing", "Monkey Man Blues", "I Don't Know" and "Pitchin' Boogie". His talent was likened to that of Pinetop Smith and other prominent boogie-woogie artists, including Meade Lux Lewis, Cow Cow Davenport and Jimmy Yancey. Lofton was also said to have influenced Erwin Helfer.

== Discography ==
- Clarence's Blues (1979), Oldie Blues OL 2817
