= Silvan Zingg =

- Born: 19 March 1973 (age 53); Manno, Switzerland
- Genres: Boogie-woogie, jazz, blues
- Occupations: Musician, record producer
- Instrument: Piano
- Website: silvanzingg.com

Silvan Zingg (born 19 March 1973) is a Swiss boogie woogie, blues, and jazz pianist and, in 2002, the founder of the International Boogie Woogie festival in Lugano, Switzerland.

== Musical career ==
Zingg was born in Lugano Switzerland to a musical family. Before he started school, he had learned to play the piano and was inspired by the work of American blues pianists.

He gave his first overseas solo concert at 18 years of age. He was the youngest pianist and only European at the Masters of Blues & Boogie Woogie Piano Night in Charleston, South Carolina, with Jimmy Walker, and Skeeter Brandon. He has performed in other American venues, including the Cincinnati, Detroit, Newport Festivals. In November 2005, he performed with Chuck Berry in a sold out concert in Zurich. In 2011, Zingg was invited by festival promoter Claude Nobs to perform with B.B. King at the Montreux Jazz Festival.

Silvan Zingg has been producing his own piano festivals: "International Boogie Woogie Festival" in Lugano since 2002 and the "Piano Jazz auf zwei Flügeln" festival in Basel since 2010.

In 2013 Silvan Zingg wins the 'German Pinetop Award' as Boogie Woogie Entertainer of the year.

He has performed in more than 2,000 concerts in over 40 countries.

== International Boogie Woogie Festival ==
In 2002, Zingg started the International Boogie Woogie Festival in Lugano. Since then it has been held annually in April and has attracted such entertainers as Little Willie Littlefield, Kenny "Blues Boss" Wayne, Carl Sonny Leyland, Mitch Woods, Axel Zwingenberger, Vince Weber, Joja Wendt, Jean Paul Amouroux, Michael Pewny, and Chris Conz. In 2006, BBC World reported on the festival, which brought it worldwide attention.

== Boogie woogie master class and lecture ==
In 2010, Zingg was invited to give a concert/lecture about the history of boogie woogie at the University of Texas in Brownsville.

== Discography ==
- 1992: Boogie Must Go On
- 1996: Changes In Boogie Woogie with Lorenzo Milani on drums
- 1998: Double Up Boogie with Lorenzo Milani on drums, Thijs Verwer on drums, Jan Flubacher on double bass and Martijn Schok on second piano
- 2000: Boogie Woogie Duets with Martijn Schok on second piano
- 2001: In Concert Solo Piano
- 2003: Boogie Woogie Xmas with Valerio Felice
- 2004: Boogie Woogie Triology with Valerio Felice on drums and Nuno Alexandre on double bass
- 2007: Dancin' the Boogie DVD+CD Limited edition
- 2010: Boogie Woogie Ride with Valerio Felice on drums and Nuno Alexandre on double bass
- 2010: Trumpet Boogie with Reinhard Zingg on trumpet/banjo/blues harp/drums/guitar
- 2011: Hot Cat Session with Drew Davies on tenor saxophone/drums and Pascal Ammann on guitar/drums
- 2014: Solo Piano - Live and Studio
- 2016: Boogie Woogie Xmas (New edition) with Valerio Felice on drums and Nuno Alexandre on double bass
- 2017: Beloved Boogie Woogie with Vanessa Gnägi (Ladyva) on second piano, Nuno Alexandre on double bass and Valerio Fleice on drums
- 2018: Swing That Boogie with Valerio Felice on drums and Nuno Alexandre on double bass
