= Erwin Helfer =

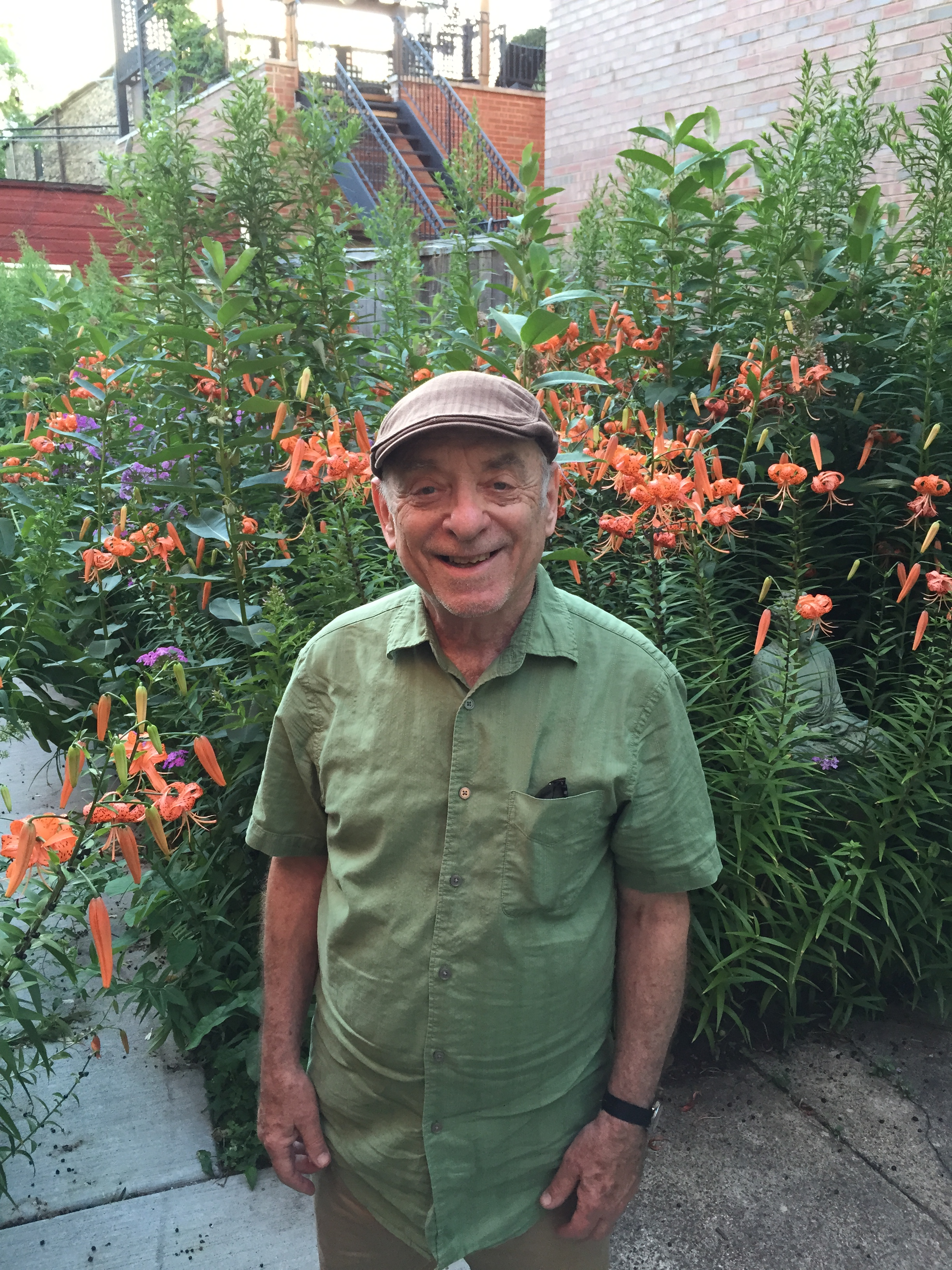
- Erwin Helfer in his backyard on July 29, 2015

Background information
- Born: January 20, 1936 (age 90)
- Origin: Chicago, Illinois, United States
- Genres: Boogie-woogie, blues, jazz
- Occupation: Musician
- Instrument: Piano
- Years active: 1970s–present
- Labels: Red Beans, Flying Fish, The Sirens
- Website: Official website

Erwin Helfer (born January 20, 1936) is an American boogie-woogie, blues, and jazz pianist. He was born and raised in Chicago. From 1960 to 2023 he recorded on various labels, including Cobra, Chess, Testament, Flying Fish, and The Sirens. He collaborated with blues pianist Jimmy Walker during the 1960s and 1970s and made two recordings with him.

== History ==
He was mentored by William Russell, who was a jazz historian and founder of American Music Records. In Chicago, Russell introduced Erwin to Warren “Baby” Dodds, Mahalia Jackson, “Cripple” Clarence Lofton, and Estelle “Mama” Yancey.

Helfer studied briefly at Tulane University. While living in New Orleans, he studied piano with Professor Manuel Manetta and became close friends with Billie and DeDe Pierce. He earned a bachelor’s degree from the American Conservatory of Music, and received a master’s in music from Northeastern Illinois University.

In 1955, Helfer recorded Billie Pierce, Rufus Perryman (Speckled Red), Doug Suggs, and James “The Bat” Robinson for “Primitive Piano” on his own Tone Records. Helfer sold recordings of Speckled Red to Bob Koester, and Red’s record became Koester’s first release for Delmar Records (later named Delmark).

He was colleagues and friends with Sunnyland Slim, Blind John Davis, and Little Brother Montgomery. He produced albums by Sunnyland, Davis, and others for Red Beans Records, which he co-founded with Peter Crawford.

Helfer made his first recording accompanying blues guitarist Big Joe Williams for Cobra in 1960. In 1964, he recorded an album of blues and boogie woogie duets with pianist Jimmy Walker, called “Rough and Ready,” for Pete Welding’s Testament Records.

He played harpsichord on Nick Gravenites’ “Drunken Boat” and “Whole Lotta Soul” 45 rpm in 1965 and participated on the album “Moogie Woogie” on Chess Records in 1970.

He recorded his second album with Jimmy Walker on Flying Fish’s inaugural LP in 1974. In 1975, he recorded “Boogie Piano Chicago Style” for Big Bear Records in the UK. Four years later he made another recording on Flying Fish with a number of Chicago jazz and blues artists. He made three recordings on his own label Red Beans, including accompanying Estelle “Mama” Yancey in 1983.

After making several recordings in Germany, he made ten recordings for The Sirens Records. His recording, “I’m Not Hungry But I Like To Eat – Blues!” was featured on NPR’s All Things Considered. This recording was also nominated for the Blues Foundation’s Comeback Artist of the Year award. He played on two piano compilations “Heavy Timbre – Chicago Boogie Piano” and “8 Hands on 88 Keys – Chicago Blues Piano Masters”. “Careless Love” and “Celebrate the Journey” were featured on NPR’s Fresh Air in January 2006 and March 2021 respectively.

In Kevin Whitehead’s NPR review of “Celebrate the Journey” he said, “For Erwin Helfer, vintage piano dialects are living traditions, not museum exhibits.” Whitehead said, “There aren’t many left who do what Helfer does with such unshowy authority… Erwin Helfer doesn’t carry his knowledge like a burden. He has fun with it … .”

Erwin taught amateurs and professional musicians how to play blues piano from his home, at various institutions like Columbia College, and at summer camp at the Augusta Heritage Center.

He is the author of Blues Piano and How To Play It, a book for intermediate and advanced pianists.

== Honors ==
Helfer has a street, "Erwin Helfer Way", named after him in the city of Chicago.

== Selective discography ==
Year	Title	Genre	Label
1974	Blues, Boogie Woogie Piano Duets & Solos	Blues, Boogie	Flying Fish
1976	Boogie Piano Chicago Style	Boogie	Big Bear
1979	On the Sunny Side of The Street	Blues, Jazz	Flying Fish
1987	Chicago Piano	Blues, Jazz	Red Beans
2001	I'm Not Hungry But I Like To Eat - Blues	Blues, Boogie, Jazz	The Sirens Records
2002	Heavy Timbre - Chicago Boogie Piano	Blues, Boogie	The Sirens Records
2002	8 Hands on 88 Keys - Chicago Blues Piano Masters	Blues, Boogie	The Sirens Records
2003	St. James Infirmary (with Skinny Williams)	Jazz, Blues and R&B	The Sirens Records
2005	Careless Love	Blues, Boogie, Jazz	The Sirens Records
2013	Erwin Helfer Way	Blues, Boogie, Jazz	The Sirens Records
2021	Celebrate the Journey (with the Chicago Boogie Ensemble)	Blues, Boogie, Jazz	The Sirens Records
