= Mitch Woods =

American pianist and singer (born 1951)

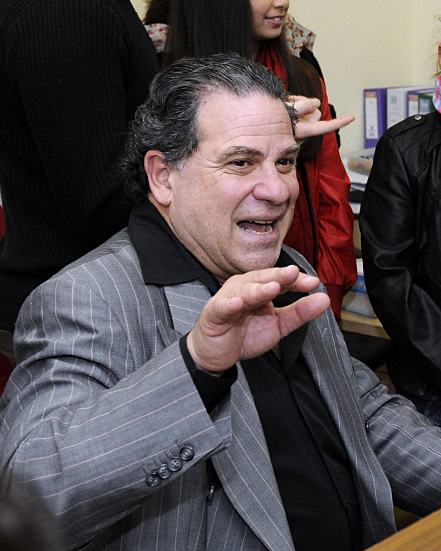

Background information
- Born: April 3, 1951 (age 75); Brooklyn, New York City, United States
- Genres: Boogie-woogie, jump blues, jazz
- Occupations: Pianist, singer, songwriter
- Instruments: Piano, vocals
- Years active: Early 1980s-present
- Labels: Blind Pig, various
- Website: Link

Mitch Woods (born April 3, 1951, Brooklyn, New York) is an American modern day boogie-woogie, jump blues and jazz pianist and singer. Since the early 1980s he has been touring and recording with his band, the Rocket 88s. Woods calls his music, "rock-a-boogie," and with his backing band has retrospectively provided a 1940s and 1950s jump blues style.

== Biography ==
Woods got his start playing clubs near the State University of New York Buffalo campus. He moved to San Francisco in 1971.

Originally a student of jazz and classical music, on relocation to the West Coast, Woods started playing jump and rhythm and blues. Upon hearing Louis Jordan's jive, Woods played throughout the 1970s as a soloist at local clubs. In 1984, Blind Pig released the debut album of the Rocket 88s, the band he had formed with HiTide Harris four years earlier. Steady Date with Mitch Woods & His Rocket 88s led to a national concert tour, including the San Francisco Blues Festival in 1985, as well as several European engagements. In 1988, they issued their second LP, Mr. Boogie's Back in Town.

In 1991 their third album, Solid Gold Cadillac, was released, followed by Shakin' the Shack (1993). Woods, capable in four styles of piano playing, Chicago blues, Kansas City boogie-woogie, West Coast jump blues and the poly-rhythmic accents of New Orleans, got the opportunity to play with some of his musical heroes, when he recorded his 1996 Viceroy album, Keeper of the Flame. Their next album, Jump for Joy, appeared in 2001.

The 2006 release, Big Easy Boogie featured veteran New Orleans musicians backing Woods. In 2007 Woods was nominated for the Pinetop Perkins Piano Player of the Year Award at the Blues Awards in Memphis, Tennessee, presented by the Blues Foundation.

Latterly he and his band toured with the Efes Pilsen Blues Festival.

== Discography ==
- Steady Date with Mitch Woods & His Rocket 88s (1984) Blind Pig Records
- Mr. Boogie's Back in Town (1988) Blind Pig
- Solid Gold Cadillac (1991) Blind Pig
- Shakin' the Shack (1993) Blind Pig
- Keeper of the Flame (1996) Viceroy/Lightyear Records
- Jump for Joy! (2001) Blind Pig
- Big Easy Boogie (2006) Club 88 Records
- Jukebox Drive (2008) El Toro Records (with The Lazy Jumpers)
- Gumbo Blues (2010) Club 88/VizzTone Records
- Blues Beyond Borders: Live in Istanbul (2012) Club 88/VizzTone Records
- Jammin' on the High Cs (2015) Club 88/VizzTone Records
- Friends Along Way (2017) eOneMusic/EOM
- A Tip of the Hat to Fats (2019) Blind Pig

== See also ==
- List of boogie woogie musicians
- List of jump blues musicians
