= Charlie Spand =

American songwriter

- Born: May 8, 1893; Columbus, Mississippi, United States
- Died: After 1958
- Genres: Blues, boogie-woogie
- Occupation(s): Pianist, singer, songwriter
- Instrument(s): Piano, vocals
- Years active: 1920s–1940s
- Labels: Paramount and Okeh

Charlie Spand (May 8, 1893 – after 1958) was an American blues and boogie-woogie pianist and singer, noted for his barrelhouse style. He was deemed one of the most influential piano players of the 1920s. Little is known of his life outside of music, and his total recordings amount to 33 tracks.

== Biography ==
There has been speculation about Spand's place of birth. AllMusic stated that some claim he was born in Elljay, Georgia, and a song he wrote, "Alabama Blues", refers to his birth in that part of the country. Various blues historians have cited Spand's songs "Levee Camp Man" and "Mississippi Blues" as evidence of connections there. However, according to the researchers Bob Eagle and Eric LeBlanc, he was born in Columbus, Mississippi, in 1893.

Spand was one of the boogie-woogie pianists, including William Ezell and others, who performed on Brady Street and Hastings Street in Detroit, Michigan, in the 1920s. In 1929, Spand relocated to Chicago, Illinois, where he met and began performing with Blind Blake.

Spand recorded 25 songs for Paramount Records between June 1929 and September 1931. The tracks were recorded in Richmond, Indiana, Chicago, and Grafton, Wisconsin. The 1929 Richmond sessions recorded seven songs with guitar accompaniment to Spand's piano playing and singing. Most of these were directly attributed to Blake. During Spand's most notable recording, he and Blake had a small conversation during the making of "Hastings Street". Another such duet occurred on "Moanin' the Blues".

After a gap in his recording career, in June 1940 Spand recorded what were to be his final eight tracks, for Okeh Records. They were made in Chicago, when Spand was backed by Little Son Joe and Big Bill Broonzy. After these recordings were made, no further reference to Spand has been found. The researchers Bob Eagle and Eric LeBlanc state that the blues musician Little Brother Montgomery said, in 1958, that Spand was still living in Chicago.

In 1992, Document Records issued The Complete Paramounts (1929–1931). Yazoo Records' Dreaming the Blues: The Best of Charlie Spand (2002) had enhanced sound quality, but without the chronological track order favored by Testament.

Spand's track "Back to the Woods" has been recorded by Kokomo Arnold, Joan Crane and Rory Block. Josh White recorded Spand's "Good Gal."

== Discography ==
=== Selected compilation albums ===
Album title	Record label	Year of release
The Complete Paramounts (1929–1931)	Document Records	1992
Dreaming the Blues: The Best of Charlie Spand	Yazoo Records	2002

== See also ==
- List of blues musicians
- List of boogie woogie musicians
