= Ladyva =

Swiss musician, boogie-woogie/blues/jazz pianist (born 1988)

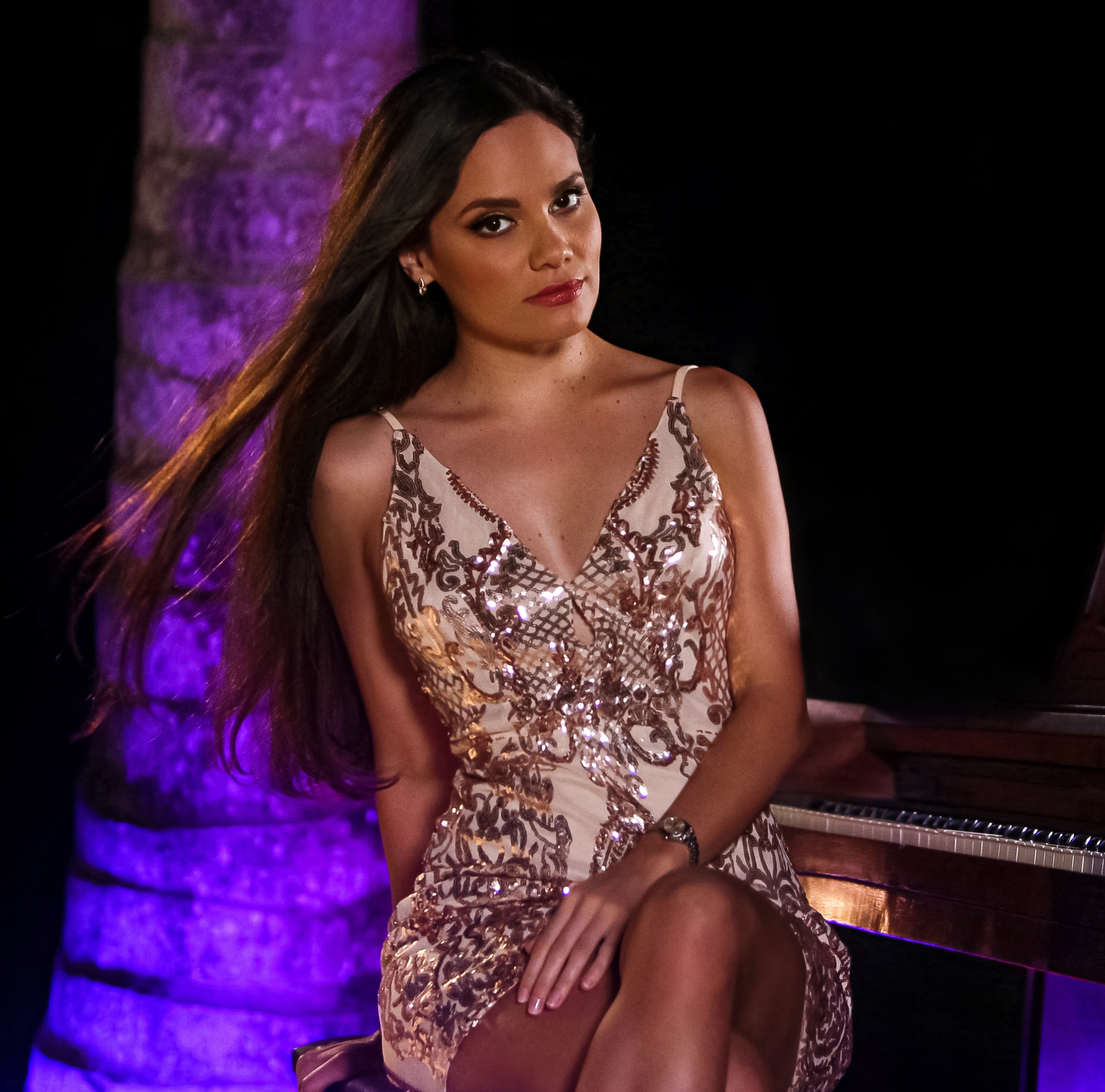
- Ladyva in 2021

Background information
- Born: Vanessa Sabrina Gnaegi; 8 December 1988 (age 37); Ipsach, Switzerland
- Origin: Bern, Switzerland
- Genres: Boogie-woogie; Blues; Jazz
- Occupations: Musician; pianist
- Instrument: Piano
- Years active: 2004–present
- Label: Universal Music
- Website: ladyva.com

YouTube information
- Channel: Ladyva
- Years active: 2013–present
- Genre: Music
- Views: 190 million
- Last updated: September 2026

Ladyva (born Vanessa Sabrina Gnaegi; formerly known as Vanessa G; born 8 December 1988) is a Swiss musician, boogie woogie, blues and jazz pianist, singer and composer.

== Musical career ==
Ladyva started playing the piano when she was 14. She was inspired by the music of the great masters of boogie woogie. Two years later she began performing, together with her brother Pascal Silva. In 2009, Ladyva released her first album Vanessa G – The Boogie Woogie Lady. In 2014, Ladyva appeared at several boogie woogie festivals in Germany.

Ladyva was invited to perform at Jerry Lee Lewis' 80th Birthday/Farewell U.K. Tour at the London Palladium and the Clyde Auditorium in Glasgow in September 2015. On 16 October 2015 she performed live on The Late Late Show on RTÉ One in Ireland. In November she toured through Europe, appearing on TV shows in Bulgaria, including Slavi's Show and the election of Miss Bulgaria. In London (Boisdale, Canary Wharf) she performed at the 'Cigar Awards' with guests including Burt Reynolds and Jonathan Ross.

In May 2016, she was invited to perform at the Boogie Woogie & Blues Spectacular hosted by Jools Holland. On 12 December she performed again at the Cigar Awards 2016 with guests including Charlie Sheen and Kelsey Grammer.

In 2016, performances at festivals in Switzerland and abroad (France, Spain, Germany) followed, together with Silvan Zingg. At the International Boogie Woogie Festival in Lugano, they presented their first joint four-handed CD "Beloved Boogie Woogie" on 22 April 2017.

In August 2017 and 2022, she was invited to perform at the world's biggest Boogie Woogie Festival at Laroquebrou in France. She also attended lots of Jazz & Boogie-Festivals all around the globe.

On 13 September 2017 in London, Ladyva received the award as 'Best Boogie Woogie Pianist 2017' at the Boisdale Music Awards hosted by Jools Holland, having just released her third Album '8 to the Bar'.

In November 2017, Ladyva performed at Beatles Symphonic at the London Coliseum singing the song "Something" accompanied by the London Concert Orchestra along with stars including Bonnie Tyler.

In 2018 she performed live on the British TV show "Loose Women" on ITV. Later that year she attended again the Boogie-Woogie and Blues Spectacular hosted by Jools Holland, this time with guests such as Hugh Laurie. alias "Dr. House".

Her 2020 piece "Quarantine Boogie" went viral on YouTube. In 2021 she released a single, "Ladyva's Stomp".

28 September 2022, Ladyva received the award as 'Boogie Woogie Artist Of The Year' at the Boisdale Music Awards hosted by Jools Holland.

In December 2022, she performed with Kool & The Gang at the great Pyramids of Giza in Egypt.

In December 2023, she released the album, Steam Train Boogie. In November 2024 she performed on Jools Holland's UK tour in prestigious theaters such as the Symphony Hall in Birmingham and the Royal Albert Hall in London.

As of September 2026, her YouTube channel has over 190 million views.

== Awards and honors ==
- 2017 Boisdale Music Awards hosted by Jools Holland: "Best Boogie Woogie Pianist 2017"
- 2022 YouTube Creator Award Silver Play Button "Ladyva - for passing 100'000 subscribers"
- 2022 Boisdale Music Awards hosted by Jools Holland: "Boogie Woogie Artist Of The Year"

== Discography ==
- 2009: Vanessa G – The Boogie Woogie Lady
- 2016: The New Orleans Experience – Jazz Ascona Festival Sampler-CD
- 2016: Ladyva & Silvan Zingg – Beloved Boogie Woogie
- 2017: Ladyva – 8 to the Bar
- 2021: Ladyva – Ladyva's Stomp
- 2023: Ladyva – Steam Train Boogie
