= Sonny and His Wild Cows =

Hungarian rockabilly band

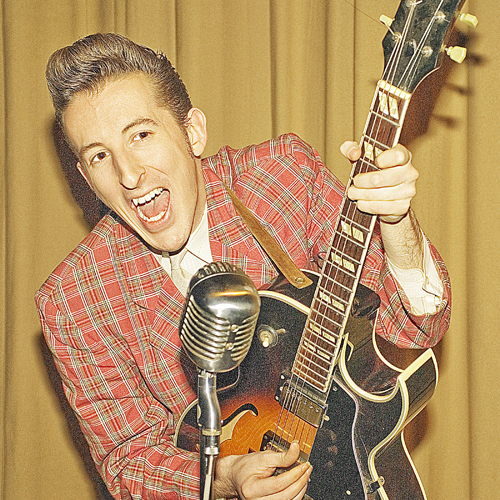
- Sonny of Sonny and His Wild Cows

Background information
- Origin: Budapest, Hungary
- Genres: Rockabilly; R&B; rock and roll; blues
- Years active: 2002–present
- Members: Sonny; Crazy Benny; Gordon Taylor; Little Tommy
- Website: www.sonny.hu

Sonny and His Wild Cows are a Hungarian rock band from Budapest. Founded in 2002, the band performs 1950s-styled rockabilly, rhythm and blues and rock and roll music.

== About Sonny ==
Sonny a.k.a. "Mr. Rhythm-and-Blues" (born 1983, Sopron, Hungary) is a singer and guitar player, one of the few rhythm and blues acts in Europe today who perform in the original 1940s–1950s style.

He debuted on stage in 1998, started alone first, with acoustic kind of country blues, then he played with various groups over the years (Blue S. Trio, Big Fat Chubby, Mystery Gang, Gál Csaba Boogie, Little G. Weevil, Raw Hide, Spo-Dee-O-Dee, Palermo Boogie Gang, Mark Tortorici, Rhythm Sophie, Tom Stormy Trio, Ed Phillips and the Memphis Patrol).

== Career ==
In 2000, he teamed up with Charming Marty harmonica player, and with him and Wins Huber guitarist and Buddy Benkey bass player he founded his own band, Sonny and His Wild Cows, in 2002. This band played (and is still playing) almost all kinds of American music of the 1940s and 1950s, blues, rhythm and blues, rock and roll, rock-a-billy, swing, country and western.

The members of the band changed over the years (in 2012 they are Sonny - vocal/guitar, Crazy Benny - piano, Gordon Taylor - bass, Little Tommy - drums, plus lot of times they have one or two saxophones or a harmonica player added).

In 2008, they released their first CD "Mr. Rhythm-and-Blues", in 2011 they made a five songs CD, and in June 2012 they were studio bound again in Berlin, Germany. They appeared many times on the national television of Hungary, and they are still playing many gigs in Hungary, plus touring around Europe. They have played in 15 countries successfully, and at festivals including the Rhythm Riot in England, Motorcycle Gang Jamboree and Red Moon Fest in Italy, South Island Rumble in Denmark, Tear It Up!! festival in Croatia, Sziget Festival in Hungary, Polish Boogie festival in Poland, D'Hiver Rock festival and Festival des Arts de Rue in Belgium, Head Banging Festival in Germany, Sighisora Blues Festival in Romania, In Wires Festival in Serbia. In 2012 they played in France and Spain for the first time.
