= Carl Sonny Leyland =

Anglo-American pianist

- Origin: near Southampton, England
- Genres: Boogie-woogie, jazz, blues
- Occupations: Pianist, songwriter, producer
- Instrument: Piano
- Website: Carl Sonny Leyland

Carl Sonny Leyland is an Anglo-American boogie woogie, blues and jazz pianist. He was born in 1965 near Southampton, England, but as a child was drawn to American music. At age 15, he discovered boogie woogie, and was inspired to make the piano his career. He came to New Orleans in 1988, and built a reputation in the clubs there for the next nine years. In 1997, he relocated to California, where he joined Big Sandy & His Flyrite Boys, a rockabilly and western swing group, touring with them for three years. Since then his repertoire has included ragtime and early jazz. He formed the Carl Sonny Leyland Trio in 2003 with Hal Smith on drums (later replaced by Jeff Hamilton) and Marty Eggers on bass. The trio plays primarily boogie woogie and traditional jazz. It has recorded seven CDs and performs regularly in festivals.

Leyland has received praise from critics and jazz festival organizers, one has commented: “We cannot heap enough praise on Carl Sonny Leyland. Not only is he a great solo pianist, he is an asset to any band and amazes other musicians…”

== Discography ==
Carl Sonny Leyland Trio:

- Ready to Boogie
- The Carl Sonny Leyland Trio Meets Nathan James & Ben Hernandez
- The Carl Sonny Leland Trio
- Dang Good Boogie
- Railroad Boogie
- Studio Session

Solo:

- Stompin’ Upstairs
- Gin Mill Jazz
- Wild Piano

With the Joel Patterson Trio:

- A Chicago Session
