= Axel Zwingenberger =

German pianist and songwriter

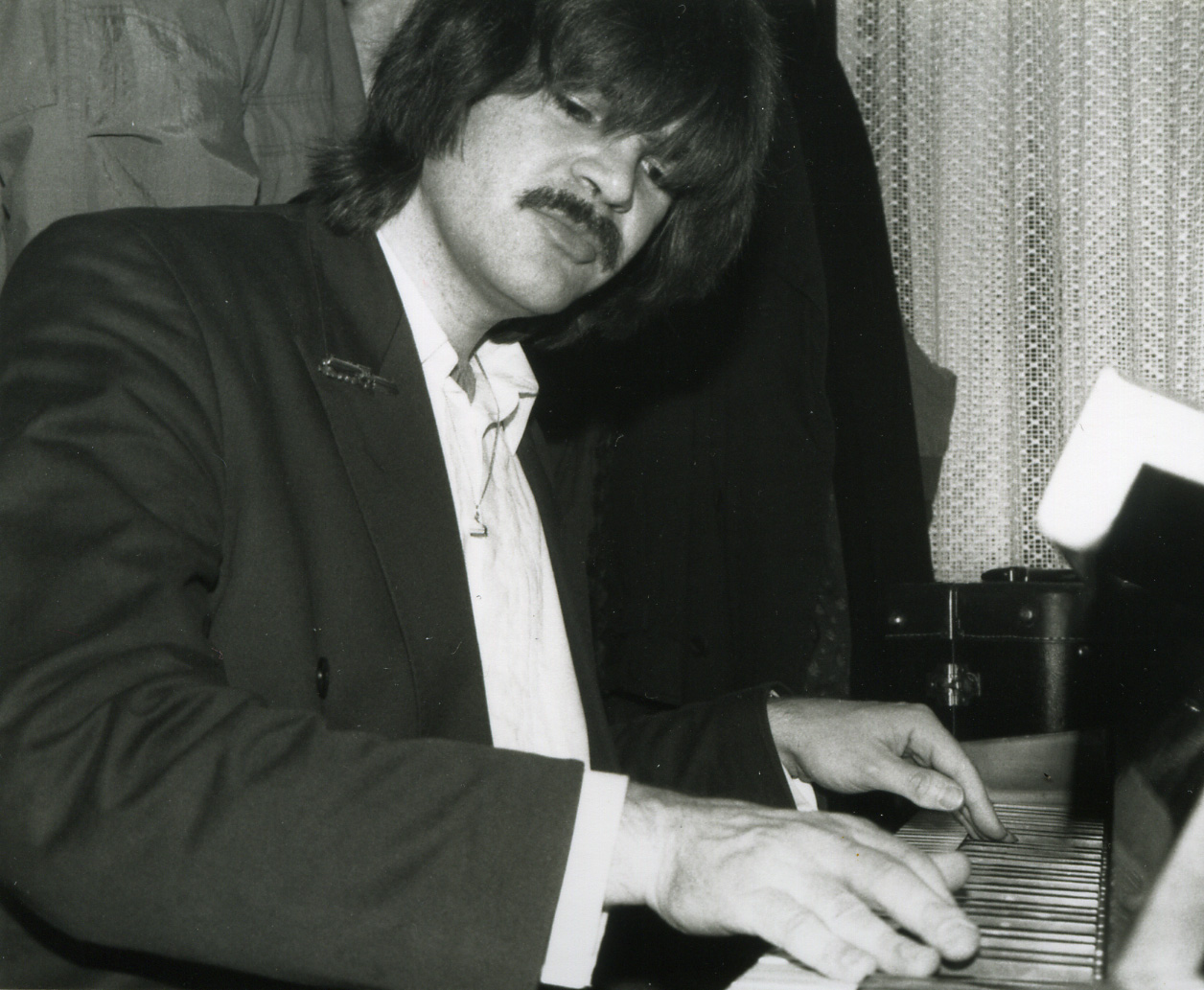
- Zwingenberger at the funeral service for Champion Jack Dupree, January 1992 in Hanover, Germany

Background information
- Born: 7 May 1955 (age 71); Hamburg, West Germany
- Genres: Jazz, blues, boogie-woogie
- Occupations: Musician, songwriter
- Instruments: Piano, celeste, harpsichord
- Years active: 1970s–present
- Labels: Vagabond, EMI, Eagle
- Website: boogiewoogie.net/2/en/0/a/0/news.html

Axel Zwingenberger (German: [ˌaksl̩ ˈt͡svɪŋənˌbɛʁɡɐ]; born 7 May 1955) is a German blues and boogie-woogie pianist and songwriter.

== Biography ==
Zwingenberger was born in Hamburg, West Germany, and enjoyed 11 years of classical piano training. After listening to recordings by pianists Pete Johnson, Albert Ammons, Meade "Lux" Lewis, he became a boogie-woogie musician. In 1974 he performed with pianists Hans-Georg Moeller, Vince Weber and Martin Pyrker at the First International Blues and Boogie Woogie Festival in Cologne, West Germany. They also played at the Stars of Boogie Woogie and the Hans Maitner festival.

A year later he signed with a record label, which released his solo albums Boogie Woogie Breakdown, Power House Boogie, and Boogie Woogie Live. He has worked with Ray Bryant, Champion Jack Dupree, Lloyd Glenn, Lionel Hampton, Jay McShann, Cili Marsall, Joe Newman, Sammy Price, Big Joe Turner, Sippie Wallace, Charlie Watts, Vince Weber, Bill Wyman, and Mama Yancey. His publications include Boogie Woogie: Piano Solo, a book of twelve of his compositions transcribed.

A railfan since early childhood, he published photographs of steam locomotives in The Magic of Trains and established a non-profit group with the German Foundation for the Protection of Historical Monuments which works for the preservation of trains, such as the steam-powered DR 18 201.

In early 2009, with the English pianist Ben Waters, Zwingenberger renewed his relationship with Charlie Watts, the drummer of the Rolling Stones. With bassist Dave Green, they played concerts under the name The ABC&D of Boogie Woogie. In June 2012 they released their first album, Live in Paris (Eagle 2012), and performed in New York City at Lincoln Center and the Iridium Jazz Club.

== Selective discography ==
Year	Title	Solo albums	Label
1996	Boogie Back to New York City	solo	Vagabond
1992	Boogie Woogie Classics	solo	PolyGram
1985	Boogie Woogie Live	solo	Vagabond (also issued on Calligraph)
1980	Power House Boogie	solo	Vagabond
1978	Boogie Woogie Breakdown	solo	Telefunken
Year	Title	Combinations	Label
2012	The ABC&D of Boogie Woogie – Live in Paris	w/Ben Waters, Charlie Watts, Dave Green	Eagle
2012	The Joy of Boogie Woogie	w/Keito Saito	Quatre Mains
2010	The Magic of Boogie Woogie	w/Charlie Watts, Dave Green	Vagabond
2009	Lady sings the Boogie Woogie	w/Lila Ammons	Vagabond
2008	Saxy Boogie Woogie	w/Big Jay McNeely & The Bad Boys	Vagabond
2004	Groovology	w/Gottfried Boettger	Vagabond
1999	Brothers in Boogie	w/Torsten Zwingenberger	Vagabond
1999	The Boogiemeisters	w/Vince Weber	Vagabond
1996	Swing the Boogie!	w/Jay McShann	Vagabond
1982	The Boogie Woogie Album	w/Lionel Hampton Orchestra	Vagabond
1978	Let's Boogie Woogie All Night Long	w/Big Joe Turner	Vagabond
1976 2015	Boogie Woogie Session '76 live in Vienna – The Complete Recordings	w/Hans-Georg Möller, Martin Pyrker, Torsten Zwingenberger, Vince Weber	EMI/Vagabond (re-release of 2 CDs + DVD)
Year	Title	Axel Zwingenberger & The Friends of Boogie Woogie – Series	Label
2000	Vol. 10: Kansas City Boogie Jam	w/Big Joe Duskin, Sammy Price, Jay McShann	Vagabond
1999	Vol. 9: Red Hot Boogie Woogie Party	w/Red Holloway, Mojo Blues Band	Vagabond
1993	Vol. 8: Heat It Up	w/Red Holloway, Mojo Blues Band	Vagabond
1992	Vol. 7: Champion Jack Dupree sings Blues Classics	w/Champion Jack Dupree, Mogens "Basse" Seidelin, Michael Strasser	Vagabond
1990	Vol. 6: On Stage with Champion Jack Dupree	w/Champion Jack Dupree, Torsten Zwingenberger	Vagabond
1988	Vol. 5: Champ's Housewarming	w/Champion Jack Dupree, Mojo Blues Band	Vagabond
1987	Vol. 4: The Blues of Mama Yancey	w/Estella "Mama" Yancey	Vagabond
1986	Vol. 3: An Evening with Sippie Wallace	w/Sippie Wallace	Vagabond
1985	Vol. 2: Between Hamburg & Hollywood	w/Big Joe Turner, Joe Newman, Lloyd Glenn, Torsten Zwingenberger	Vagabond
1984	Vol. 1: Sippie Wallace	w/Sippie Wallace	Vagabond
