= Speckled Red =

- Born: Rufus George Perryman; October 23, 1892; Hampton, Georgia, United States
- Died: January 2, 1973 (aged 80) St. Louis, Missouri, United States
- Genres: Blues, boogie-woogie
- Occupations: Musician, songwriter
- Instruments: Vocals, piano
- Years active: 1920s–1960s

Rufus George Perryman (October 23, 1892 – January 2, 1973), known as Speckled Red, was an American blues and boogie-woogie piano player and singer noted for his recordings of "The Dirty Dozens", exchanges of insults and vulgar remarks that have long been a part of African-American folklore.

== Life and career ==
Speckled Red was born in Hampton, Georgia. He was the older brother of Piano Red. Their nicknames were derived from both men being albinos. The brothers were separated by almost a generation and never recorded together. Speckled Red and Piano Red both played in a raucous goodtime barrelhouse boogie-woogie style, although Speckled Red played slow blues more often. Both recorded versions of "The Right String (But the Wrong Yo-Yo)", Speckled Red in 1930 and Piano Red, who had a hit with the song 20 years later.

Prior to his birth the family had moved for brief periods to Detroit, Michigan, and then Atlanta, Georgia, after his father violated Jim Crow laws, before settling in Hampton, Georgia. The family, consisting of Perryman and seven brothers and sisters, had little musical background. Speckled Red was a self-taught piano player, influenced primarily by his idol Fishtail and by Charlie Spand, James Hemingway and William Ezell and initially inspired by Paul Seminole in a movie theatre. He also learned to play the organ at his church.

By his mid-teens he was playing house parties and juke joints. He moved back to Detroit in his mid-20s to play anywhere he could, including nightclubs and brothels, and was noticed by a Brunswick Records talent scout just before he left for Memphis, Tennessee, where he was located by Jim Jackson. It was here that he had his first recording sessions, resulting in two classics for Brunswick, "Wilkins Street Stomp" and the hit "The Dirty Dozens". Although the lyrics were sung rather than spoken, with its elaborate wordplay and earthy subject matter, "The Dirty Dozens" is considered in some respects a precursor of rap music.

"I want all you women to fall in line
"And shake yo shimmy like i'm shakin' mine
"You shake yo shimmy and you shake it fast
"If you can't shake the shimmy, shake yo' yas yas yas"

"You a dirty mistreater, a robber and a cheater
"Stick you in a dozens and yo pappy is yo cousin
"And yo mama do the lawdylawd"

The following year, 1930, he recorded again, this time in Chicago, Illinois, resulting in most notably "The Dirty Dozens No. 2," which was not nearly as successful and the pianist was without a contract or label and again playing making the rounds at Memphis venues and in St. Louis bars. His 1938 session work in Aurora, Illinois, with the slide guitar player Robert Nighthawk and the mandolinist Willie Hatcher for Bluebird Records, was steady and long but also unsuccessful, and sometime in the 1940s he moved back to St. Louis and continued his career of playing in taverns. He also worked as a laborer in a public produce market until servicemen returned home to heavy lifting jobs.

== Revival and death ==
Charlie O'Brien, a St. Louis policeman and something of a blues aficionado who applied many of his professional investigative methods to track down old bluesmen during the 1950s, "rediscovered" Speckled Red on December 14, 1954, who subsequently was signed to Delmark Records as the label's first blues artist. He experienced a small revival of interest in his music during the late 1950s and 1960s, his abilities still considerable, and worked around the St. Louis-area jazz scene, regularly as the intermission pianist for the Dixie Stompers, performing concerts with Dixie Mantinee and the St. Louis Jazz Club, played the Goldenrod Showboat, and played the University of Chicago Folk Festival in 1961, went to Dayton, Ohio, with Gene Mayl's Dixieland Rhythm Kings, and toured Europe in 1959 with Chris Barber. Several recordings were made in 1956 and 1957 for the Tone, Delmark, Folkways, and Storyville record labels.

His age, however, had become a factor, and the remainder of the 1960s saw scattered performances. He died of cancer on January 2, 1973, in St. Louis, at the age of 80.

== Discography ==
- The Dirty Dozens, Delmark Records
- The Barrel-House Blues of Speckled Red, Smithsonian Folkways Recordings, 1961
