= Vince Weber =

German blues pianist (1953–2020)

- Born: October 26, 1953; Hamburg, West Germany
- Died: February 23, 2020 (aged 66)
- Genres: Boogie-woogie, blues
- Occupation: Musician
- Instruments: Piano, vocals
- Years active: 1970s–2018
- Labels: EMI, Rüssl Räckords, Blue Song
- Website: vince-weber.de

Vince Weber (October 26, 1953 – February 23, 2020) was a German blues and boogie-woogie pianist.

== Biography ==
Born in Hamburg, West Germany, Weber started taking piano lessons aged ten, in 1963. His sister introduced him to the blues by giving him records of Lightnin' Hopkins, Michael Pewny, Champion Jack Dupree, Taj Mahal and many others. At the age of sixteen he played in bars in the harbour of his hometown Hamburg, where he met Hans-Georg Möller, another pianist, who introduced him to the boogie-woogie style of playing piano. There he also met the comedian Otto Waalkes, who booked him as opener for his then-current tour. In 1975 he released his first album, The Boogie Man on Otto Waalkes' Rüssl Räckords, which was awarded 'Deutscher Schallplattenpreis 1976'. This album was partly recorded in the Fabrik (Hamburg), where he has had a regular gig once a month for 14 years since 1976. In 1978 he traveled to the United States for the first time. In 1980 he became disc jockey at the local NDR radio station, where he hosted a weekly Blues broadcast.

He played with Big Joe Williams, Abi Wallenstein, Henry Heggen, Axel Zwingenberger, Jay McShann, James Booker, Chuck Berry and Champion Jack Dupree at music festivals and in clubs all over Germany.

Due to illness, Vince Weber reduced his stage activities in later years. He died on February 23, 2020, aged 66.

== Discography ==
Weber has issued nine records.

- 1975 – The Boogie Man (CD / LP)

issued by Rüssl Räckords, produced by Thomas Kukuck
1. "I'm The Boogie Man"
2. "Chicago Breakdown"
3. "Dust My Broom"
4. "Another Babe"
5. "Talk To Me, Baby"
6. "Mr. Pinetop's Job"
7. "Days Began To Drive Down"
8. "Boogie Woogie Runner"
9. "Roll 'Em Pete"

- 1976 — Boogie Woogie Session '76 Live in Vienna - The Complete Recordings (CD / DVD)

issued 2015 by Vagabond Records with Hans-Georg Möller, Axel Zwingenberger, Martin Pyrker, Torsten Zwingenberger & Vince Weber produced by Hans Maitner

- 1977 – Blues 'n Boogie (CD / LP)

issued by Rüssl Räckords, produced by Thomas Kukuck
1. "Speed Freak"
2. "I've Got To Move"
3. "Keep-A-Knockin'"
4. "I Used To Be Happy"
5. "Nobody Knows You"
6. "Snout Swinger"
7. "My Life Is A Boogie" with Inga Rumpf (vocal)
8. "Cherry Red"
9. "Let's Boogie"
10. "How Many More Years"
11. "Blue Note"
12. "Low Down Dog"

- 1980 – Vince the Prince (CD / LP)

issued by Rüssl Räckords, produced by Thomas Kukuck
1. "Vince The Prince"
2. "What's Wrong With Me"
3. "Kiddin' Music"
4. "Everything But Fight"
5. "I've Got My Mojo Working"
6. "White Man's Swing"
7. "MDM Snapper"
8. "Never Blue For Long" with Steve Baker (harmonica)
9. "Trust In God" with Steve Baker (harmonica)

- 1987 – Boogie On a Blue Song (CD)

issued by Rüssl Räckords, produced by Thomas Kukuck
1. "Somebody Might Get Hurt"
2. "I've Got My Own Way To Rock"
3. "A Little Tune For You"
4. "Saturday Night Fish Fry"
5. "Rum 'n' Ola"
6. "He Knows The Rules"
7. "Beat Me Daddy, Eight To The Bar"
8. "Boogie All The Time"
9. "Take A Giant Step Outside Your Mind"
10. "Trouble In Mind"
11. "Forty-Four Blues"
12. "I Need Help"
13. "The Blues Is Here To Stay"

- 1991 – Octoroon (CD / LP)

issued by Blue Song, produced by Thomas Kukuck
1. "Rock It"
2. "Down The Road A Piece"
3. "The Blues Won't Get Tired Of Me"
4. "Flip Flop and Fly"
5. "Going Down Slow"
6. "Boogie Woogie Country Girl"
7. "Tell Me How Do You Feel"
8. "When Girls Do It"
9. "Octoroon"
10. "I'm Doing Fine"
11. "Can't Trust Your Neighbour"
12. "The Dirty Dozen"

- 1995 – The Best Yet - Part 1

issued by Rüssl Räckords, produced by Thomas Kukuck
1. "I'm The Boogie Man"
2. "Boogie Woogie Runner"
3. "Roll 'Em Pete"
4. "Speed Freak"
5. "I've Got To Move"
6. "Keep-A-Knockin'"
7. "I Used To Be Happy"
8. "Nobody Knows You"
9. "My Life Is A Boogie" with Inga Rumpf
10. "Cherry Red"
11. "Let's Boogie"
12. "Vince The Prince"
13. "What's Wrong With Me"
14. "Kiddin' Music"
15. "Everything But Fight"
16. "I've Got My Mojo Working"
17. "White Man's Swing"
18. "Never Blue For Long" with Steve Baker (harmonica)

- 1995 – The Best Yet - Part 2

issued by Rüssl Räckords, produced by Thomas Kukuck
1. "MDM Snapper"
2. "Somebody Might Get Hurt"
3. "I've Got My Own Way To Rock"
4. "A Little Tune For You"
5. "Saturday Night Fish Fry"
6. "Rum 'n' Ola"
7. "He Knows The Rules"
8. "Beat Me Daddy, Eight To The Bar"
9. "Boogie All The Time"
10. "Take A Giant Step Outside Your Mind"
11. "Trouble In Mind"
12. "I Need Help"
13. "The Blues Is Here To Stay"
14. "The Blues Won't Get Tired of Me"
15. "Flip Flop and Fly"
16. "Going Down Slow"
17. "Octoroon"
18. "The Dirty Dozen"

- 2001 – The Boogiemeisters (Axel Zwingenberger and Vince Weber)

issued by Vagabond Records, produced by Frank Dostal & Axel Zwingenberger
1. "Boogie Woogie Country Girl"
2. "Welcome To Boogie City"
3. "The Boogiemeisters"
4. "I've Got To Move"
5. "The Dirty Dozen"
6. "Fantasy In Blues"
7. "Boogie For Real"
8. "Foot Pedal Boogie"
9. "Sixth Avenue Express"
10. "Midnight Hour Blues"
11. "Roll 'Em Pete"
12. "The Higher We Jump"
13. "Low Down Dog"

- 2002 – Into it (Vince Weber and Michael Maass)

issued by stormy monday records
1. "Into It"
2. "Ramblin' With That Woman"
3. "Pinetop's Boogie Woogie"
4. "I Don't Know"
5. "Evil"
6. "Rock It"
7. "Melina"
8. "He Was A Friend of Mine"
9. "You Can't Trust Your Neighbour"
10. "Boogie Woogie Country Girl"
11. "Love Potion No. 9"

- 2009 - Delta Echo (Vince Weber and Peter Müller - drums)

issued by Styx Records, produced by Vince Weber
1. "Movin' Slow"
2. "Shake, Rattle & Roll"
3. "Mother Earth"
4. "I'm Ready"
5. "Blue Light Booge"
6. "Mojo Working"
7. "Lilian's Blues"
8. "Pinetops Boogie Woogie"
9. "Saturday Night Fish Fry"
10. "Delta Echo"
11. "Corey Harris Boogie"
12. "Going Down"
13. "Early In The Morning"
14. "Cross Point Switch"
15. "You've Got To Serve Somebody"
