= Bernice Edwards =

American blues singer, pianist and songwriter (c. 1907–1969)

Background information
- Also known as: Moanin' Bernice Edwards; Moanin' Bernice; Houston Bernice Edwards; Bernice Duke
- Born: c. 1907; Katy, Texas, United States
- Died: February 26, 1969 Houston, Texas, United States
- Genres: Classic female blues
- Occupations: Singer, songwriter, pianist
- Instruments: Piano, vocals
- Years active: 1926–1935
- Labels: Paramount, Broadway, Vocalion

Bernice Edwards (c. 1907 – February 26, 1969) was an American classic female blues singer, pianist and songwriter. She recorded a total of 21 tracks between 1926 and 1935. Unusually for a female blues performer at the time, Edwards composed some of her songs. Details of her life outside the recording studio are sketchy.

== Life and career ==
Edwards was probably born in Katy, Texas, and raised in Houston. Although Edwards was not directly related to them, she grew up with a musical family, which included Beulah Belle, George, Hociel and Hersal Thomas. During her time with them she learned to play the piano.

In 1923, she relocated along with George and Hersal Thomas to Chicago, Illinois. Five years later, at two separate recording sessions in February and November 1928, Edwards recorded twelve songs for Paramount Records, which included "Moaning Blues". This title may have led to her being sometimes billed as "Moanin' Bernice (Edwards)". She accompanied herself while singing the mainly slow blues songs, which also included her version of "Long Tall Mama." Her common theme was of the "lowlife" and mean men, typified by the aforementioned plus "Mean Man Blues" and "Hard Hustling Blues." Some of her early recordings were released under the name Bernice Duke.

In 1935, Edwards returned to the recording studio, this time in Fort Worth, Texas for American Record Corporation. Alongside Black Boy Shine, she recorded piano duets including one entitled "Hot Mattress Stomp". The recording included some guitar playing by J. T. "Funny Papa" Smith. Her own piano playing had also gained in dynamics since her first visit to a recording studio.

Her self-penned track "Butcher Shop Blues" (1935), extended the analogy of meat for sexual innuendo, although her vocals on it appeared to be less strong and expressive. Following the Fort Worth session, Edwards apparently got married and joined the church, after which nothing much more is known of her life.

According to researchers Bob Eagle and Eric LeBlanc, she died in Hermann Hospital in Houston in 1969, aged about 62.

Her work is included on various compilation albums.

== See also ==
- List of classic female blues singers

== Other sources ==
- Evans, David (1993). Liner notes, Texas Piano Vol. 1 (1923–1935). Document Records DOCD-5224.
- Larkin, Colin, ed. (1998). Encyclopedia of Popular Music (3rd ed.). New York: Muze. ISBN 9780333741344.
