= Woo-Woo (song) =

Single by Harry James and the Boogie Woogie Trio
- A-side: "Boo-Woo"
- B-side: "Woo-Woo"
- Released: 1939
- Recorded: February 1, 1939
- Genre: Boogie-woogie
- Label: Brunswick 8318
- Songwriter: Harry James

Music video
- "Woo-Woo" (audio) on YouTube

"Woo-Woo"

Song by Harry James and the Boogie Woogie Trio

from the album Boogie Woogie
- Released: 1941
- Recorded: February 1, 1939
- Genre: Boogie-woogie
- Label: Columbia C44, disc #35958
- Songwriter: Harry James

"Woo-Woo" is the B-side of the 78-rpm jazz instrumental single recorded on February 1, 1939, by Harry James and The Boogie Woogie Trio.

Shortly after leaving Benny Goodman's band and before starting his own band, James entered the studio at the suggestion of Columbia Records producer John Hammond. James was paired with Albert Ammons (on "Woo-Woo") and Pete Johnson (on the flip side's "Boo-Woo"), the two foremost practitioners of boogie-woogie piano, which was enjoying a substantial revival at the time. They were accompanied by Johnny Williams on bass and Eddie Dougherty on drums. The group recorded four songs during this February 1, 1939, recording session in New York City: "Boo-Woo", "Woo-Woo", "Home, James", and "Jesse".

In the U.S., "Woo-Woo" was released several times over the years by Columbia Records or its subsidiaries:

- In 1939 on the B-side of the 78-rpm single on Brunswick 8318 (label matrix #B 24061)
- In 1941 on the four-disc, 78-rpm compilation album Boogie Woogie, Columbia C-44 (disc #35958)
- In 1952 on the two-disc, 45-rpm compilation EP Boogie Woogie, Columbia B-1611 (disc #5-1360)
- In 1955 on the 45-rpm EP Eight to the Valve, Columbia B-2048
- In 1955 on the compilation LP Upright And Lowdown, Columbia CL-685
- In 2002 on the compilation CD Swingtown, Sony A 54462, Collectables COL-CD-7450
