= Boogie Woogie (album) =

1941 compilation album of boogie-woogie music

Compilation album by Harry James, Count Basie, Big Joe Turner, Albert Ammons, Pete Johnson, and Meade Lux Lewis
- Released: 1941
- Recorded: 1936–1939
- Genre: Boogie-woogie
- Label: Columbia (C44)

Boogie Woogie is a compilation album containing four 10-inch, 78 rpm records of boogie-woogie music. The songs on the album were recorded over a period of three years from 1936 to 1939, then released in 1941 on this compilation album by Columbia Records (C44). Artists featured on the album include Harry James, Count Basie, Big Joe Turner, and the three prominent boogie-woogie pianists of the time, Albert Ammons, Pete Johnson, and Meade Lux Lewis.

== Background ==
Boogie-woogie music was enjoying a surge in popularity in the 1930s and 40s. Record producer John Hammond invited Johnson and Turner to New York to appear at Carnegie Hall along with Ammons and Lewis in the first "From Spirituals to Swing" concert held on December 23, 1938. Count Basie, who was leading a quintet and sextet as well as his big band, also performed at the concert. The boogie-woogie pianists were a sensation, igniting a boogie craze that would last for a decade. Earlier that year, Hammond had paved the way for Jazz performances at Carnegie Hall by organizing the appearance of the Benny Goodman orchestra on January 16, 1938, which featured Harry James on trumpet.

The day after the "From Spirituals to Swing" concert, Alan Lomax recorded Ammons, Lewis and Johnson for the Library of Congress. On December 30, 1938, the three pianists cut the two-sided "Boogie Woogie Prayer" for Vocalion Records; Lewis recorded "Bear Cat Crawl" on the same date, and Ammons recorded the flip side, "Shout for Joy", two days later. The December 30, 1938 session also yielded Turner and Johnson's first record, "Roll 'Em Pete", backed with "Goin' Away Blues."

Ammons and Lewis played "Roll 'Em" with Benny Goodman's band on the Camel Caravan radio program on January 3 and April 11 of 1939; Johnson did the same on January 31. On February 1, at John Hammond's suggestion, Ammons and Johnson each recorded a couple of sides ("Boo-Woo" and "Woo-Woo") for Brunswick Records with trumpeter Harry James, who had just left Goodman's band. Later that year, all three pianists were billed with James's own big band, featuring the then-unknown Frank Sinatra at the Hotel Sherman in Chicago.

The earliest of the recordings, "Boogie Woogie" by Pinetop Smith and recorded by Count Basie, resulted after John Hammond had heard Basie's band over short-wave radio and went to Kansas City to check them out. Hammond invited the band to Chicago in October, 1936 to record four sides which were released on Vocalion under the band name of Jones-Smith Incorporated; the sides were "Shoe Shine Boy", "Evening", "Boogie Woogie", and "Oh, Lady Be Good". Though Basie had already signed with Decca Records, he did not have his first recording session with them until January 1937.

== Release ==
In December 1931, Warner Bros., which owned the Vocalian label, licensed the label to American Record Corporation (ARC). ARC, in turn, was purchased by CBS, and Vocalion became a subsidiary of Columbia Records in 1938. Though all four records in this album set were originally available as singles on the Vocalion or Brunswick labels, they each carry the Columbia label in this set. The album cover was designed by Alex Steinweiss.

== Track listing ==
These songs were featured in a four-disc, 78 rpm album set, Columbia Album No. C44.

Disc 1: (35958)

1. "Boo-Woo" (C44-1, B 24060), recorded February 1, 1939, by Harry James and the Boogie Woogie Trio (Pete Johnson, Johnny Williams, Eddie Dougherty)
2. "Woo-Woo" (C44-2, B 24061), recorded February 1, 1939, by Harry James and the Boogie Woogie Trio (Albert Ammons, Johnny Williams, Eddie Dougherty)

Disc 2: (35959)

3. "Roll 'Em Pete" (C44-3, 23892), recorded December 30, 1938, by Pete Johnson with Big Joe Turner on vocals
4. "Boogie Woogie" (C44-4, C1659), by Pinetop Smith and recorded October 1936 by Count Basie's Blue Five with James Rushing on vocals

Disc 3: (35960)

5. "Boogie Woogie Prayer (Part One)" (C44-5, 23890-1), recorded December 30, 1938, by Albert Ammons, Pete Johnson, and Meade Lux Lewis (Three Pianos)
6. "Boogie Woogie Prayer (Part Two)" (C44-6, 23890-2), recorded December 30, 1938, by Albert Ammons, Pete Johnson, and Meade Lux Lewis (Three Pianos)

Disc 4: (35961)

7. "Shout for Joy" (C44-7, 23894), recorded January 1, 1939, by Albert Ammons (Piano Solo)
8. "Bear Cat Crawl" (C44-8, 23893), recorded December 30, 1938, by Meade Lux Lewis (Piano Solo)
