= George Washington Thomas =

American blues and jazz pianist and songwriter (1937–1942)

Background information
- Also known as: Gut Bucket George; Clay Custer (disputed)
- Born: George Washington Thomas Jr. March 9, 1883; Plum Bayou Township, Pine Bluff, Arkansas, U.S.
- Died: March 6, 1937 (aged 53) Chicago, Illinois, U.S.
- Genres: Jazz, blues, boogie-woogie
- Occupations: Musician, composer, music publisher
- Instrument: Piano
- Years active: c.1900–1930

George Washington Thomas Jr. (March 9, 1883 – March 6, 1937) was an American blues and jazz pianist and songwriter. He wrote several influential early boogie-woogie piano pieces including "The New Orleans Hop Scop Blues", "The Fives", and "The Rocks", which some believe he may have recorded himself under the name Clay Custer.

== Life and career ==
=== Early life in Arkansas and Houston ===
George W. Thomas Jr. was the second of thirteen children born to Fanny (née Bradley) and George W. Thomas. He was born in Plum Bayou Township, just outside the Delta town of Pine Bluff, Arkansas. In the late 1890s the family moved to Houston, Texas, where George W. Thomas Sr. became a deacon at the Shiloh Baptist Church.

George Jr. played piano, cornet and saxophone from an early age, and worked as a pianist in local theaters. His daughter Hociel was born in 1904; his wife died a few years later, and Hociel was largely raised by her grandmother and her aunt Beulah, later known as Sippie Wallace, who was George Jr.'s sister. Singer Bernice Edwards was also raised as a member of the Thomas family. Around 1910, George W. Thomas Jr. formed a friendship with Clarence Williams, who was also working in the Houston theaters; they may have also met Jelly Roll Morton around this time.

=== New Orleans ===
By 1914, Williams and Thomas both began working in New Orleans, where they set up a publishing company to issue and promote compositions and arrangements by Williams and, later, Thomas. George Thomas played at parties, becoming known as "Gut Bucket George". In 1916, he published "The New Orleans Hop Scop Blues", a twelve-bar blues that included "an articulated left hand... notated using grace notes for the lower tone [which] created a pseudo boogie bass." This is credited as one of the earliest boogie woogie piano pieces, and established Thomas as a music publisher and composer.

Some of his pieces were played in the Storyville area of New Orleans by his young brother Hersal Thomas, who had joined him in the city and performed with local musicians including King Oliver and his protégé Louis Armstrong. Among George Thomas' compositions was "Muscle Shoals Blues", written in New Orleans but not published until later. The tune was recorded as a piano roll by James P. Johnson, and on disc by Fats Waller.

=== Chicago ===
After his father's death in 1917, Thomas became the effective head of the family. Following the closedown of the Storyville area of New Orleans, he moved to Chicago in 1920, and was joined there by his sister Beulah "Sippie" Wallace, who also became a performer, and by his brother Hersal, though his mother remained in Houston until her death. By now the sole proprietor of his publishing company, Thomas reissued some of his earlier compositions and also played with local groups and accompanied singers, including Sippie. In all he was credited with over 100 compositions.

In 1922, he published "The Fives", co-written with brother Hersal, and inspired by a train traveling between Chicago and San Francisco. This was "the first published boogie-woogie with a boogie bass line throughout," and "helped to inspire a generation of boogie-woogie pianists" such as Meade Lux Lewis and Albert Ammons. The following year, he is widely credited with recording another of his compositions, "The Rocks", for Okeh Records, which contains the earliest recording of a walking bass. The recording was credited to Clay Custer, generally regarded as a pseudonym, but there is some disagreement over whether the performer was Thomas himself, or another pianist, possibly Hersal Thomas or Harry Jentes.

In Chicago, George Thomas also recorded as an accompanist for Tiny Franklin on Gennett Records, and had his own jazz group, the Muscle Shoals Devils, who made recordings that were not released. Thomas was respected as a composer, and was quoted in the Music Trade Review in 1924:

The world wants dancing music, and, tunefulness apart, wants something not reminiscent of hundreds of dances that have gone before... It is a waste of energy for the composer or publisher to plagiarize a winner. The music buying public is too wise today. And people who love to dance, even if they do not play music, are quick to appreciate novelty in melody and theme in a new song.

George Thomas continued to publish compositions after his brother Hersal's sudden death, aged 19 in June 1926, but his output diminished in the late 1920s. His last recordings were with singer Lillian Miller for Gennett in 1928.

=== Death ===
Although in her later years Sippie Wallace claimed that George Thomas had died in about 1930 as a result of an accident involving a streetcar, official records including his death certificate state that he died in Chicago in 1937, from breaking his back falling down stairs, possibly after a fire had broken out. He was buried at Restvale Cemetery in Alsip, Illinois.
