= Boogie-Woogie Dream =

- Directed by: Hanus Burger
- Written by: Karl Farkas
- Produced by: Mark Marvin; Leslie Winik
- Starring: Lena Horne; Teddy Wilson; Albert Ammons; Pete Johnson; Russel Morrison; Virginia Pine
- Distributed by: Official Films
- Release date: July 6, 1944
- Running time: 13 minutes
- Country: United States
- Language: English

Boogie-Woogie Dream (1944) is an independently made short film musical, directed by Hanus Burger, starring Lena Horne, Albert Ammons, Pete Johnson and Teddy Wilson and his orchestra. Scott Yanow identifies it as a sextet.

It is a significant film in the history of jazz for its early glimpse of Lena Horne (in her second film) and as the only film of boogie-woogie piano masters Albert Ammons and Pete Johnson.

== Synopsis ==
Boogie-Woogie Dream

In a nightclub, Teddy Wilson and his orchestra are laying down their last groove for the night. In the audience, Mr. Weathercoop (Russel Morrison) and his date (Virginia Pine) briefly discuss Wilson's band. Back in the kitchen, where Albert Ammons is hanging paper and Pete Johnson tunes a piano, a kitchen maid (Lena Horne) begins to sing about how she would like to perform in a new gown, rather than to wash dishes. Pete Johnson provides an impromptu accompaniment, and then Ammons joins in on a duet; a cutaway informs us that the Weathercoops are paying attention. The Weathercoops fall asleep, and this leads to a dream where the kitchen maid has gotten her evening gown; she introduces Ammons and Johnson, who play Boogie Woogie Dream. Teddy Wilson then conjures up his band and backs up the maid, with some help from Johnson, on the song Unlucky Woman. This is followed by a jam with Wilson's band, illustrated by a montage. Ammons, Johnson and the kitchen maid are then seen sleeping, propped up at the piano; the phone rings and wakes them up. Mr. Weathercoop ends up with the call, and afterward gives the others the offer that they have been dreaming about.

== Background and dissemination ==
Hanus (or Hannes) Burger (1909–1990) was a Czech documentary filmmaker who had fled to the United States in the wake of the Anschluss; footage he had taken when the Germans invaded Prague was incorporated into the acclaimed documentary film Crisis (1939 film), which Burger co-directed with Herbert Kline and Alexander Hammid. Crisis was widely acclaimed in the United States, and its success of helped propel Burger through a long string of left-wing documentaries, U.S. War Department films and other kinds of official documentary work throughout the 1940s. Boogie Woogie Dream was a side project, inspired by the musicians at Café Society in New York, a popular nightspot and frequent location for live radio remotes; it served as the flash point for the Boogie Woogie craze in New York City.

Boogie Woogie Dream was written by Austrian cabaret performer and emigrant Karl Farkas and produced by Mark Marvin, a playwright and the older brother of Herbert Kline. It was made by Burger and his small crew at Astoria Studios on Long Island. Albert Ammons and Pete Johnson, Horne, and Teddy Wilson and his orchestra were all acts then engaged at Café Society; Wilson was an established swing bandleader and pianist, whereas Horne was a relative newcomer. According to Burger, he had first wanted to engage Billie Holiday to play the kitchen maid in the film, but Holiday proved unavailable for the shooting, and he settled on Horne instead.

The film was shot in the latter part of September 1941, but it took at least three years for Burger to render it into a completed form. Burger sold it outright to Bert and Jack Goldberg in 1944; the Goldbergs were entrepreneurs in the field of race movies marketed directly to black audiences. By this time, Lena Horne had already become a star in mainstream Hollywood films. The Goldbergs extracted three distinct sections from the film, "Unlucky Woman," "My New Gown" and "Boogie Woogie Dream" (consisting only of Ammons and Johnson's duet) and redistributed the shorter films through Soundies Distributing Corporation, who copyrighted the titles on December 30, 1944. Nevertheless, the Goldbergs also passed the short versions on to the theatrical distributor Sack Amusements, while continuing to book the original film on a States' Rights Basis; it was also distributed to the home market in 16mm.

== Preservation ==
The only copyrights filed relating to Boogie Woogie Dream were for the Soundies shorts derived from it. No prints are known of what the film may have been like before it was sold to the Goldbergs; the "Official Films" logo is seen at the front of all surviving copies of the longer version, indicating that the 16mm home version is the main extant source for the film. If they made any other changes in the film itself, however, Burger never commented on them. 16mm prints of the full film are held by the Black Film Center/Archive at Indiana University in Bloomington, Indiana, the film archives of Time River Productions in Pasadena, and at the UCLA Film and Television Archive. It has been included on several DVDs; the short versions crop up also on video collections going back into the VHS era. The long version is included in "Boogie Woogie," a Storyville Films release and on "Classic Musicals", a 12-disc set from Millcreek Entertainment, disc 9A.
