= Estelle Yancey =

American singer (1896–1986)

- Also known as: Estelle "Mama" Yancey
- Born: Estella Harris; January 1, 1896; Cairo, Illinois, United States
- Died: April 19, 1986 (aged 90) Chicago, Illinois, United States
- Genres: Blues, boogie-woogie
- Occupation: Singer
- Years active: 1950s–1980s
- Label: Atlantic

Estelle "Mama" Yancey (January 1, 1896 – April 19, 1986) was an American blues singer. She was nominated four times for Blues Music Awards as Traditional Blues Female Artist.

== Life and career ==
Yancey was born Estella Harris in Cairo, Illinois, and grew up in Chicago, where she sang in church choirs and learned to play the guitar. In 1925, when she was 29, she married Jimmy Yancey, who had traveled in the United States and Europe as a vaudeville dancer. She often sang with him at informal gatherings and house parties in the 1940s and performed with him at Carnegie Hall in 1948. Jimmy Yancey was a boogie-woogie and blues piano player, and Estelle recorded several times with him. In 1943, the Yanceys recorded for Session Records. They recorded the album Pure Blues for Atlantic Records in 1951, just a few months before Jimmy Yancey's death that same year.

Estelle continued to perform and record. In her later years, she often performed with Chicago pianist Erwin Helfer, especially at the University of Chicago Folk Festival. One of the best examples of her singing is on the album Jimmy and Mama Yancey: Chicago Piano, Vol. 1 (Atlantic Records, 1952), which includes "Make Me a Pallet on the Floor," "Four o'Clock Blues," "Monkey Woman Blues," "Santa Fe Blues," and "How Long Blues".

Yancey's recordings with other pianists include Mama Yancey, Singer, Don Ewell, Pianist (Windin' Ball Recordings, 1952); Chicago—The Living Legends: South Side Blues (Riverside, 1961); Mama Yancey Sings, Art Hodes Plays Blues (Verve Records, 1965); Maybe I'll Cry, with Erwin Helfer (Red Beans, 1983) recorded when she was 86 and 87 years old; and The Blues of Mama Yancey: Axel Zwingenberger and the Friends of Boogie Woogie, Vol. 4 (Vagabond Records), recorded in 1982 and 1983 and released in 1988.

Yancey died at the age of 90 on April 19, 1986, in Chicago. In 2016 the Killer Blues Headstone Project placed a headstone for Estelle Yancey at Burr Oak Cemetery in Alsip, Illinois.

== Selective discography ==
Year	Title	Genre	Label
1943	"How Long Blues," "Pallet on the Floor," and "Make Me a Pallet on the Floor"	Blues	Session
1951	Jimmy and Mama Yancey: Chicago Piano, Vol. 1 (originally released as Ma and Jimmy Yancey Special)	Blues	Atlantic
1983	Maybe I'll Cry	Blues	Red Beans
