= Lena Horne: The Lady and Her Music =

- Poster for Lena Horne: The Lady and Her Music
- Productions: 1981–1982 Broadway; 1982–1983 US National Tour, Canada; 1984 West End, Stockholm, Sweden

Lena Horne: The Lady and Her Music was a 1981 Broadway musical revue written for and starring American singer and actress Lena Horne. The musical was produced by Michael Frazier, Fred Walker & Sherman B. Sneed, and the cast album was produced by Quincy Jones. The well received show opened on May 12, 1981, at the Nederlander Theatre and after 333 performances, closing to go on tour on June 30, 1982, Horne's 65th birthday. Horne toured with the show in the U.S. and Canada and performed in London and Stockholm in 1984.

== Background ==
Lena Horne (1917–2010), is an American singer and actress. Horne joined the chorus of the Cotton Club at the age of sixteen and became a band singer and nightclub performer before moving to Hollywood where she had small parts in numerous movies, and much more substantial parts in the films Cabin in the Sky and Stormy Weather (1943). Due to the red scare and her progressive political views, she was blacklisted and unable to get work in Hollywood. She returned to her roots as a nightclub performer. In the 1960s she participated in the March on Washington and performed in nightclubs and television. She announced her retirement in March 1980 and performed a two-month farewell tour of the United States. Director Arthur Faria discarded the multi character script called Lena's World and conceived for her a one-woman show which became Lena Horne: The Lady and Her Music-

== Format ==
Throughout the show Horne sang and danced to Tin Pan Alley songs, jazz standards, music from films in which she had appeared, and songs written for her. The show sought to portray Horne's life from her beginning in show business to the present. During the show she spoke of the racism that she had encountered, describing how Hollywood producers told her she opened her mouth too big when she sang and devised a makeup for her, Light Egyptian, which was applied to white actresses such as Ava Gardner and Hedy Lamarr, who took roles that Horne could have possibly played.

Horne performed her signature song, "Stormy Weather", twice in the show, the first time more subdued than the second. She was accompanied by dancers and backup singers. Costumes were designed by Giorgio di Sant' Angelo.

== Response ==
=== Critical reception ===
The Broadway production opened at the Nederlander Theatre on May 12, 1981, after thirteen previews, and met with a positive critical response. Stephen Holden, reviewing the album of the show in Rolling Stone, wrote that Horne had "turned the conventions of the one-person extravaganza inside out...Instead of a self-glorifying ego trip, her performance is a shared journey of self-discovery about the human cost (to the audience as well as the singer) of being a symbol", adding that Horne's singing "hits peaks of ferocity, tenderness, playfulness and sheer delight that would have seemed unthinkable in her glamour-girl days...her performance here is a sustained cry of affirmation, and because that affirmation acknowledges the bitterness, cynicism and toughness of the world, it's exceptionally moving in ways that conventionally optimistic musical celebrations rarely are".

Also reviewing the album, Mike Freedberg of The Boston Phoenix noted that in Horne's best songs, "she acts out the lesson of her show: how her daughters should make love and why--to transform anger to pride, to feel themselves taking charge. Horne goes after her lyrics as if they were her lovers, seducing them with a furious, righteous soulfulness."

Newsweek described Horne as "the most awesome performer to have hit Broadway in years", while The New York Times said she "transforms each song...into an intensely personal story that we've never quite heard before".

=== Awards ===
At the 1981 Drama Desk Awards, Lena Horne: The Lady and Her Music was nominated for four Drama Desk Awards, winning one. It lost the Drama Desk Award for Outstanding Musical to The Pirates of Penzance. Arthur Faria was nominated for the Outstanding Director of a Musical and Thomas Skelton for Outstanding Lighting Design. Horne won the Drama Desk Award for Outstanding Actress in a Musical. In 1981 she won a special Tony Award at the 35th Tony Awards, a special award from the New York Drama Critics' Circle, and the City of New York's Handel Medallion.

At the 24th Grammy Awards, Quincy Jones won a Grammy Award for Best Musical Show Album. Horne also won a Grammy for Best Pop Vocal Performance, Female.

== Musical numbers ==
- "From This Moment On"
- "I Got a Name"
- "I'm Glad There Is You"
- "I Want to Be Happy"
- "Copper Colored Gal"
- "Raisin' the Rent"
- "As Long as I Live"
- "The Lady with the Fan"
- "Where or When"
- "Can't Help Lovin' Dat Man"
- "Just One of Those Things"
- "Stormy Weather"
- "Love"
- "Push de Button"
- "The Lady Is a Tramp"
- "Yesterday, When I Was Young"
- "'Deed I Do"
- "Life Goes On"
- "Watch What Happens"
- "The Surrey with the Fringe on Top"
- "Fly"
- "Bewitched, Bothered and Bewildered"
- "A Lady Must Live"
- "That's What Miracles Are All About"
- "I'm Gonna Sit Right Down and Write Myself a Letter"
- "If You Believe"

== Soundtrack ==
Lena Horne: The Lady and Her Music
- CD album cover

Soundtrack album by Lena Horne
- Released: 1981
- Recorded: 1981
- Genres: Traditional pop Vocal jazz
- Length: 102:44
- Language: English
- Label: Qwest
- Producer: Quincy Jones

Lena Horne chronology
Lena: A New Album (1976)	Lena Horne: The Lady and Her Music (1981)	The Men in My Life (1988)

The soundtrack of the show was produced by Quincy Jones and released by Jones' record label, Qwest Records. At the Grammy Awards of 1982, Quincy Jones won the Grammy Award for Best Musical Show Album, and Horne won the Grammy for Best Pop Vocal Performance, Female.

== Personnel ==
- Lena Horne – vocals
- Grady Tate – drums
- Steve Bargonetti – guitar
- Bob Cranshaw – double bass
- Cecil Bridgewater
- Glenn Drewes
- Frank Foster
- Peter Gordon
- Craig S. Harris
- Jack Jeffers
- J.D. Parran Jr.
- Roger Rosenberg
- Mort Silver
- Warren Smith
- Linda Twine
- Harold Vick
- Sherman Sneed
- Fred Walker
- Michael Frazier
- Clare Bathé
- Vondie Curtis Hall
- Tyra Ferrell
