= Lena Horne: The Lady and Her Music (album) =

Cast recording by Lena Horne
- Released: 1981
- Genres: Vocal jazz, traditional pop, show tunes
- Label: Qwest Records
- Producer: Quincy Jones

Lena Horne chronology
Lena: A New Album (1976)	Lena Horne: The Lady and Her Music (1981)	The Men in My Life (1988)

Lena Horne: The Lady and Her Music, subtitled Live on Broadway, is an album containing a recording of the 1981 musical Lena Horne: The Lady and Her Music. The album was released in the same year on Qwest Records, a record label run by Quincy Jones, and was manufactured and distributed by Warner Bros. Records Inc.

== Background ==
The album was produced by Quincy Jones.

It was recorded live by Bruce Swedien at the David T. Nederlander Theatre in New York City and mixed by him as well.

The musical's company consisted of Clare Bathe, Tyra Ferrell, and Vondie Curtis-Hall.

== Critical reception ==
Professional ratings
Review scores
Source	Rating
AllMusic	4.5/5 stars
The Encyclopedia of Popular Music	3/5 stars

AllMusic rates the album 4.5 stars out of 5. The album is reviewed there by William Ruhmann, who describes the musical as "one showstopper after another, and a fitting capper to [Lena Horne's] great career."

== Chart performance ==
The album spent nine weeka on the Billboard Top LPs & Tapes chart, peaking at number 112.

It also charted on the Billboard Best Selling Jazz LPs chart

== Track listing ==
2 × LP – Qwest 2QW 3597

Side 1
No.	Title	Writer(s)	Note(s)	Length
1.	"Overture" "Act I"			3:24
2.	"From This Moment On"	Cole Porter		2:01
3.	"I Got a Name"	Norman Gimbel / Charles Fox		4:00
4.	"I'm Glad There Is You"	Paul Madeira / Jimmy Dorsey		3:07
5.	"I Want to Be Happy"	Vincent Youmans / Irving Caesar		2:45
6.	"Cotton Club Revue"; 6. "Copper Colored Gal"; 7. "Raisin' the Rent"; 8. "As Long As I Live"; 9. "Lady with a Fan""	B. Davis / J. Fred Coots; Ted Koehler / Harold Arlen; Ted Koehler / Harold Arlen; Cab Calloway / Jeanne Burns / Al Brackman	Vondie, Clare, Tyra; Clare & Tyra; Lena & Vondie; Clare & Tyra	1:25; 0:55; 2:16; 1:10
10.	"Lena's Dialogue" ("Cotton Club to Hollywood")			1:06
11.	"Where or When"-"(Hollywood sequence)"	Richard Rodgers / Lorenz Hart	Voice of Hollywood: William B. Williams	2:18

Side 2
No.	Title	Writer(s)	Length
1.	"Can't Help Lovin' Dat Man"	Oscar Hammerstein II / Jerome Kern	2:35
2.	"Lena's Dialogue" ("Hollywood")		1:36
3.	"Just One of Those Things"	Cole Porter	0:38
4.	"Stormy Weather" (Part I)	Ted Koehler / Harold Arlen	2:37
5.	"Love"	Ralph Blane / Hugh Martin	1:40
6.	"Lena's Dialogue" ("Broadway")		1:38
7.	"Push de Button"	E.Y. Harburg / Harold Arlen	2:56
8.	"The Lady Is a Tramp"	Richard Rodgers / Lorenz Hart	2:54
9.	"Yesterday, When I Was Young" ("Hier Encore")	Charles Aznavour / Herbert Kretzmer	5:15

Side 3
No.	Title	Writer(s)	Length
1.	"Deed I Do"	Walter Hirsch / Fred Rose	3:53
2.	"Life Goes On"; Intermission "Act II"	Paul Williams / Craig Doerge	3:09
3.	"Watch What Happens"	Norman Gimbel / Michele Legrande	3:10
4.	"The Surrey with the Fringe on Top"	Richard Rodgers / Oscar Hammerstein II	3:37
5.	"Fly"	Martin Charnin	5:29
6.	"Bewitched, Bothered and Bewildered"	Richard Rodgers / Lorenz Hart	5:11

Side 4
No.	Title	Writer(s)	Length
1.	"A Lady Must Live"	Richard Rodgers / Lorenz Hart	2:31
2.	"Lena's Dialogue" ("Love This Business")		2:04
3.	"That's What Miracles Are All About"	Charlie Smalls / Sam Harkness	3:51
4.	"Lena's Dialogue" ("Early Career")		8:24
5.	"I'm Gonna Sit Right Down and Write Myself a Letter"	Joe Young / Fred Ahlert	3:00
6.	"Stormy Weather" (Part II)	Ted Koehler / Harold Arlen	4:39
7.	"If You Believe"	Charlie Smalls	2:21
8.	"Curtain Music" ("Stormy Weather", bows)	Ted Koehler / Harold Arlen	1:25

== Charts ==
Chart (1981–1982)	Peak position
US Billboard Best Selling Jazz LPs	?
US Billboard Top LPs & Tapes	112

== Awards ==
Year	Award type	Categories	Results	Ref.
1982	Grammy Awards	Best Musical Show Album	Won	
1982	Grammy Awards	Best Pop Vocal Performance, Female	Won	
