= 8 to the Bar =

Studio album by Pete Johnson and Albert Ammons
- Released: September 1941
- Recorded: May 7 and June 17, 1941
- Genre: Boogie-woogie
- Label: Victor

Professional ratings
Review scores
Source	Rating
The Virgin Encyclopedia of The Blues (Colin Larkin)	3/5 stars
Allmusic	4.5/5 stars

8 to the Bar is a studio album released by Pete Johnson and Albert Ammons in 1941 on Victor 78 rpm set P-69, record numbers 27504 through 27507.

== Background ==
It was recorded in two sessions, May 7 and June 17, 1941. It was reissued by RCA Victor in 1952 as a 10-inch LP record as LPT-9. In the United Kingdom, this LP was released by the Gramophone Company as HMV DLP 1011. It was also released as a set of four 45 rpm discs, WPT-14.

== Chart performance ==
The album peaked at number 2, in 1945, on Billboard's album chart.

== Track listing ==
All titles credited to Johnson and Ammons

8 to the Bar track listing
No.	Title	Length
1.	"Cuttin' the Boogie" (27504A)
2.	"Barrel House Boogie" (27504B)
3.	"Boogie Woogie Man" (27505A)
4.	"Walkin' the Boogie" (27505B)
5.	"Sixth Avenue Express" (27506A)
6.	"Pine Creek" (27506B)
7.	"Foot Pedal Boogie" (27507A)
8.	"Movin' the Boogie" (27507B)
