= Hersal Thomas =

American blues pianist and composer (1906–1926)

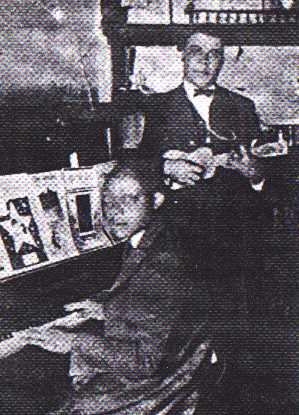
- Hersal Thomas (seated) and his older brother, George Washington Thomas

Background information
- Born: September 9, 1906; Houston, Texas, United States
- Died: June 2, 1926 (aged 19) Detroit, Michigan, United States
- Genres: Blues
- Occupation(s): Pianist, composer
- Instrument: Piano
- Years active: 1920–1926
- Labels: Okeh Records

Hersal Thomas (September 9, 1906 – June 2, 1926) was an American blues pianist and composer. He recorded a number of sides for Okeh Records in 1925 and 1926.

Thomas was born in Houston, Texas, United States, and displayed an early talent for blues playing and composition. He was one of several musicians in his family. His brother George Washington Thomas was also a skilled piano player and composer, while his sister Sippie Wallace and niece Hociel Thomas were singers of note.

Though he died at a young age, Thomas was nonetheless an influence on the Chicago boogie woogie school of pianists. Albert Ammons and Meade Lux Lewis both cited him as an influence. His most famous track was "Suitcase Blues" (8958-A Okeh 8227), which was issued on CD in 1992 as part of the box set, Roots 'N Blues: The Retrospective. The Thomas brothers also co-wrote "The Fives", which Ammons and Lewis cited as an essential boogie-woogie number.

Thomas recorded under his own name, and as an accompanist to Hociel Thomas, Sippie Wallace, Lilian Miller and possibly, Sodarisa Miller. In 1926, he recorded a session with Hociel Thomas and Louis Armstrong. The songs recorded on that occasion were "Deep Water Blues" (9519-A Okeh 8297), "Lonesome Hours" (9522-A Okeh 8297), "Listen To Ma" (9521-A Okeh 8346), and "G'wan, I Told You" (9520-A Okeh 8346). The first three are listed as having been composed by "Thomas", though it is not clear if this refers to Hersal or his brother. He also worked in session with King Oliver.

Sippie Wallace recorded seven of his compositions: "A Jealous Woman Like Me", "A Man for Every Day of the Week", "Dead Drunk Blues", "Have You Ever Been Down?", "I Feel Good", "Shorty George Blues" and "Trouble Everywhere I Roam".

Thomas died of food poisoning while working at Penny's Pleasure Inn in Detroit, Michigan. The circumstances of his death, at the age of 19, have never been clarified.
