= Jimmy Yancey =

American pianist, composer, and lyricist (1895-1951)

- Born: James Edward Yancey; February 20, c. 1895; Chicago, Illinois, U.S.
- Died: September 17, 1951 Chicago, Illinois
- Genre: Boogie-woogie
- Instrument: Piano
- Years active: 1939–1951
- Label: Atlantic

James Edward Yancey (February 20, c. 1895 – September 17, 1951) was an American boogie-woogie pianist, composer, and lyricist. One reviewer described him as "one of the pioneers of this raucous, rapid-fire, eight-to-the-bar piano style".

== Biography ==
Jimmy Yancey was born in Chicago, Illinois, most likely in 1895. However, at different times he stated 1900 and 1903, and other sources give 1894 or 1898. Researchers Bob Eagle and Eric LeBlanc suggest 1901.

His brother, Alonzo Yancey (1897–1944), was also a pianist, and their father was a vaudeville guitarist and singer. By age ten, Yancey had toured across the United States as a tap dancer and singer, and by twenty he had toured throughout Europe. He began teaching himself to play the piano at the age of 15, and by 1915 had gained a sufficient profile to influence younger musicians, including Meade Lux Lewis and Albert Ammons.

Yancey played in a boogie-woogie style, with a strong-repeated figure in the left hand and melodic decoration in the right, but his playing was delicate and subtle rather than hard driving. He popularized the left-hand figure that became known as the "Yancey bass", later used in Pee Wee Crayton's "Blues After Hours", Guitar Slim's "The Things That I Used to Do", and many other songs. Yancey favored keys—such as E♭ and A♭—that were atypical for barrelhouse blues. Distinctively, he ended many pieces in the key of E♭, even if he had played in a different key until the ending.

Although influential from an early age, Yancey did not record at all in his early career, performing only at house parties and clubs. His first recordings, in 1939, created a considerable stir in blues and jazz circles. He made most of his recordings solo, but later in his career he recorded with his wife, Estelle Yancey, singing, as Jimmy and Mama Yancey. They appeared in concert at Carnegie Hall in 1948, and recorded their first album in 1951, released by Atlantic Records the following year. During World War I, Yancey played baseball for the Chicago All-Americans, a Negro league baseball team. From 1925 to 1950, he worked as a groundskeeper for the Chicago White Sox.

== Death ==
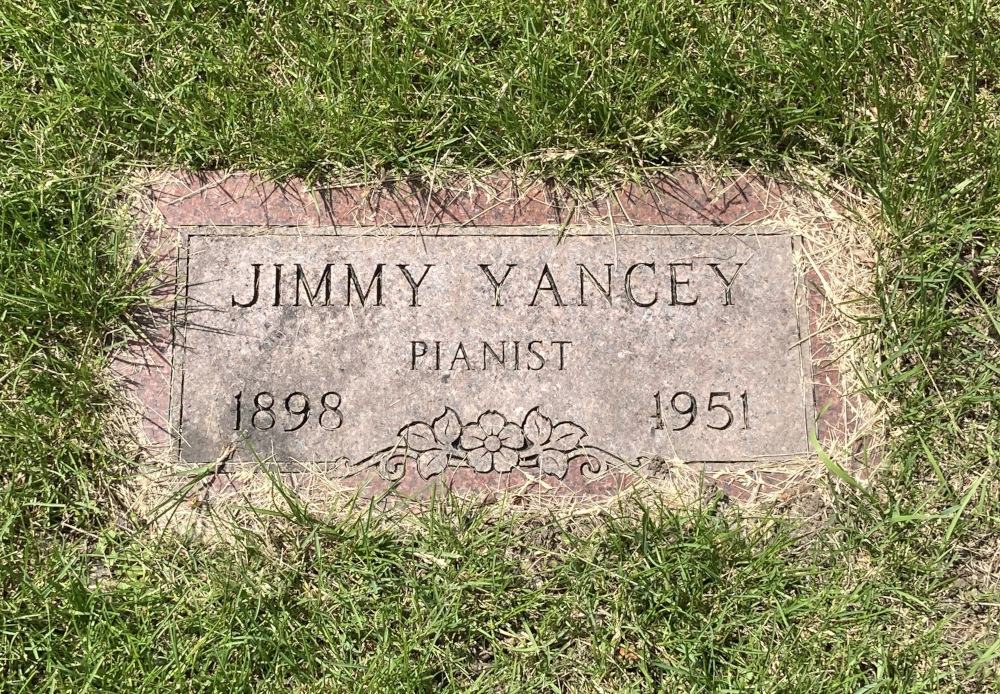
Yancey's grave at Lincoln Cemetery

Jimmy Yancey died of a diabetes-induced stroke in his native Chicago on September 17, 1951, and was buried at Lincoln Cemetery in Blue Island, Illinois. He was inducted into the Rock and Roll Hall of Fame in 1986.

== Discography ==
=== Singles ===
| Year | Title | Label and Number |
|---|---|---|
| 1939 | "Beezum Blues" | Solo Art, unissued |
| 1939 | "Big Bear Train" | Solo Art, unissued |
| 1939 | "Janie's Joys" | Solo Art, unissued |
| 1939 | "Jimmy’s Stuff" | Solo Art 12008 |
| 1939 | "How Long Blues" | Solo Art, unissued |
| 1939 | "How Long Blues No. 2" | Solo Art, unissued |
| 1939 | "Lean Bacon" | Solo Art, unissued |
| 1939 | "LaSalle Street Breakdown" | Solo Art, unissued |
| 1939 | "Lucille's Lament" | Solo Art, unissued |
| 1939 | "P.L.K. Special" | Solo Art, unissued |
| 1939 | "Rolling the Stone" | Solo Art, unissued |
| 1939 | South Side Stuff | Solo Art, unissued |
| 1939 | "Steady Rock Blues" | Solo Art, unissued |
| 1939 | "Two o'Clock Blues" | Solo Art, unissued |
| 1939 | "The Fives" | Solo Art 12008 |
| 1939 | "Yancy Getaway" | Solo Art, unissued |
| 1939 | "Yancy Limited" | Solo Art, unissued |
| 1939 | "Five o'Clock Blues" | Victor 26590-A |
| 1939 | "Slow and Easy Blues" | Victor 26591-B |
| 1939 | "State Street Special" | Victor 26589-A |
| 1939 | "Tell 'Em About Me" | Victor 26590-B |
| 1939 | "The Mellow Blues" | Victor 26591-A |
| 1939 | "Yancy Stomp" | Victor 26589-B |
| 1940 | "Bear Trap Blues" | Vocalion 05490 |
| 1940 | "Crying in My Sleep" | Bluebird B-8630 |
| 1940 | "Death Letter Blues" | Bluebird B-8630 |
| 1940 | "I Love to Hear My Baby Call My Name" | Gannet 5138 |
| 1940 | "Old Quaker Blues" | Vocalion 05490 |
| 1940 | "35th and Dearborn" | Victor 27238-B |
| 1940 | "Yancey's Bugle Call" | Victor 27238-A |
| 1943 | "Boodlin'" | Session 10-001 |
| 1943 | "Jimmy's Rocks" | Session 10-001 |
| 1943 | "Yancey's Mixture" | Session, unissued |

=== Selected albums ===
- 1974, The Immortal Jimmy Yancey 1898–1951, Oldie Blues, OL 2802
- 1980, The Immortal Jimmy Yancey 1898–1951, vol. 2, Oldie Blues, OL 2813

== Legacy and influence ==
In 1973, the Dutch composer Louis Andriessen premiered On Jimmy Yancey, a two-movement work scored for nine wind instruments, piano and double bass. Andriessen observed that Yancey was not merely one of the pioneers of the boogie-woogie piano style. "The leaping left hand of Ragtime changed into a monotonous repeating train-like figure, which in fact was more melodious than the Ragtime bass. In the first movement, three Yancey themes are quoted; the second is a kind of In Memoriam. Both movements end with a typical boogie-woogie lick, with which Yancey unexpectedly ends all his recordings. He probably did this at a sign from the producer, when the three minutes which a 78 side could hold were up, because boogie-woogie pianists habitually played for hours on end in the bars to entertain the white bourgeoisie."
