= Lena Horne =

American singer, actress, dancer and activist (1917–2010)

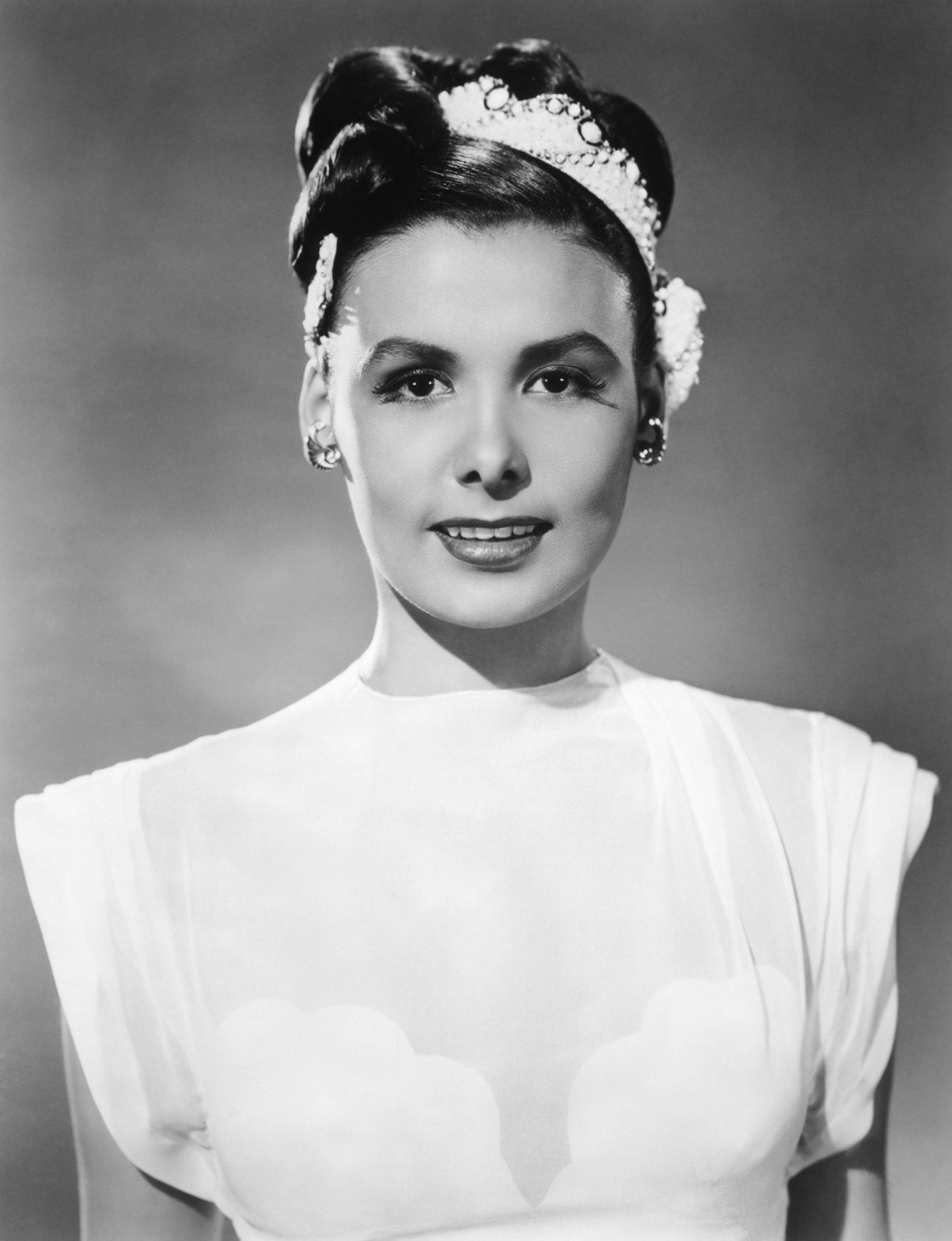
- Horne in 1946
- Born: Lena Mary Calhoun Horne; June 30, 1917; New York City, U.S.
- Died: May 9, 2010 (aged 92); New York City, U.S.
- Occupations: Singer; dancer; actress; activist
- Years active: 1933–2003
- Political party: Democratic
- Spouses: Louis Jordan Jones (m. 1937; div. 1944) Lennie Hayton (m. 1947; died 1971)
- Children: 2, including Gail Lumet Buckley (daughter)
- Relatives: Cora Calhoun Horne (grandmother); Frank Smith Horne (uncle); Jenny Lumet (granddaughter); Jake Cannavale (great-grandson)
- Musical career
- Origin: Harlem, New York City
- Genres: R&B; soul; Broadway; traditional pop; vocal jazz
- Instrument: Vocals
- Labels: MGM; RCA Victor; United Artists; Blue Note; Qwest/Warner Bros.

Lena Mary Calhoun Horne (June 30, 1917 – May 9, 2010) was an American singer, actress, dancer and civil rights activist. Horne's career spanned more than seventy years and covered film, television and theater.

Horne joined the chorus of the Cotton Club at the age of sixteen and became a nightclub performer before moving on to Hollywood and Broadway. A groundbreaking Black American performer, Horne advocated for civil rights and took part in the March on Washington in August 1963. Later she returned to her roots as a nightclub performer and continued to work on television while releasing well-received record albums. She announced her retirement in March 1980, but the next year starred in a one-woman show, Lena Horne: The Lady and Her Music, which ran for more than 300 performances on Broadway. She then toured the country in the show, earning numerous awards and accolades. Horne continued recording and performing sporadically into the 1990s, withdrawing from the public eye in 2000.

== Early life ==
Lena Horne was born in Bedford–Stuyvesant, Brooklyn to Edwin and Edna Horne on June 30, 1917. She belonged to the well-educated upper stratum of Black New Yorkers at the time. She lived the first five years of her life in a brownstone at 519 Macon Street.

Horne's father, Edwin Fletcher "Teddy" Horne Jr., a one-time owner of a hotel and restaurant, was a gambler. Teddy Horne left the family when Lena was three years old and moved to an upper-middle-class African-American community in the Hill District of Pittsburgh, Pennsylvania. Her mother, Edna Louise Scottron, was an actress with a Black theater troupe and traveled extensively. Horne was raised mainly by her paternal grandparents, Cora Calhoun and Edwin Horne.

When Horne was five she was sent to live in Georgia. For several years she traveled with her mother. From 1927 to 1929 she lived with her uncle, Frank S. Horne. He was the dean of students at Fort Valley Junior Industrial Institute (now part of Fort Valley State University) in Fort Valley, Georgia, and later served as an adviser to President Franklin Delano Roosevelt. From Fort Valley, southwest of Macon, Horne briefly moved to Atlanta with her mother; they returned to New York when Horne was twelve years old, after which Horne attended St Peter Claver School in Brooklyn.

Horne then attended Girls High School, an all-girls public high school in Brooklyn, which later became Boys and Girls High School; she dropped out at age 16. At the age of 18 she moved to her father's home in Pittsburgh, staying in the city's Hill District for almost five years and learning music from native Pittsburgers Billy Strayhorn and Billy Eckstine, among others.

== Career ==
=== Road to Hollywood ===
In the fall of 1933, Horne joined the chorus line of the Cotton Club in Harlem (New York City), which at this time featured some black performers but a whites-only audience. In the spring of 1934, she had a featured role in the Cotton Club Parade starring Adelaide Hall, who took Lena under her wing. Horne made her first screen appearance as a dancer in the musical short Cab Calloway's Jitterbug Party (1935). A few years later, Horne joined Noble Sissle's Orchestra, with which she toured and with whom she made her first records, issued by Decca. After she separated from her first husband, Horne toured with bandleader Charlie Barnet in 1940–41, but disliked the travel and left the band to work at the Café Society in New York. She replaced Dinah Shore as the featured vocalist on NBC's popular jazz series The Chamber Music Society of Lower Basin Street. The show's resident maestros, Henry Levine and Paul Laval, recorded with Horne in June 1941 for RCA Victor. Horne left the show after only six months when she was hired by former Cafe Trocadero (Los Angeles) manager Felix Young to perform in a Cotton Club-style revue on the Sunset Strip in Hollywood.

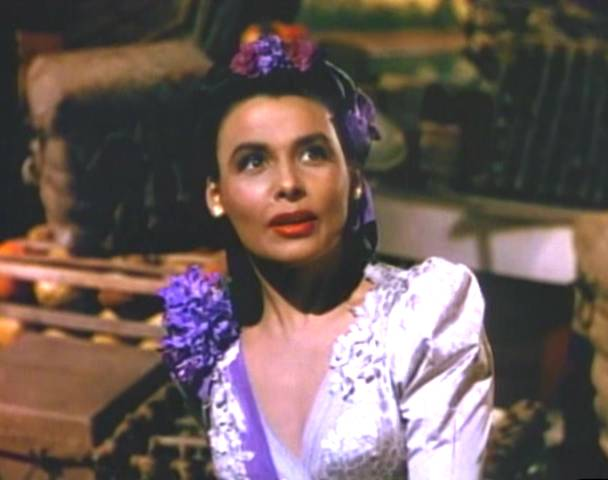
Horne as Julie LaVerne in a mini-production of Show Boat in Till the Clouds Roll By (1946), singing "Can't Help Lovin' Dat Man"

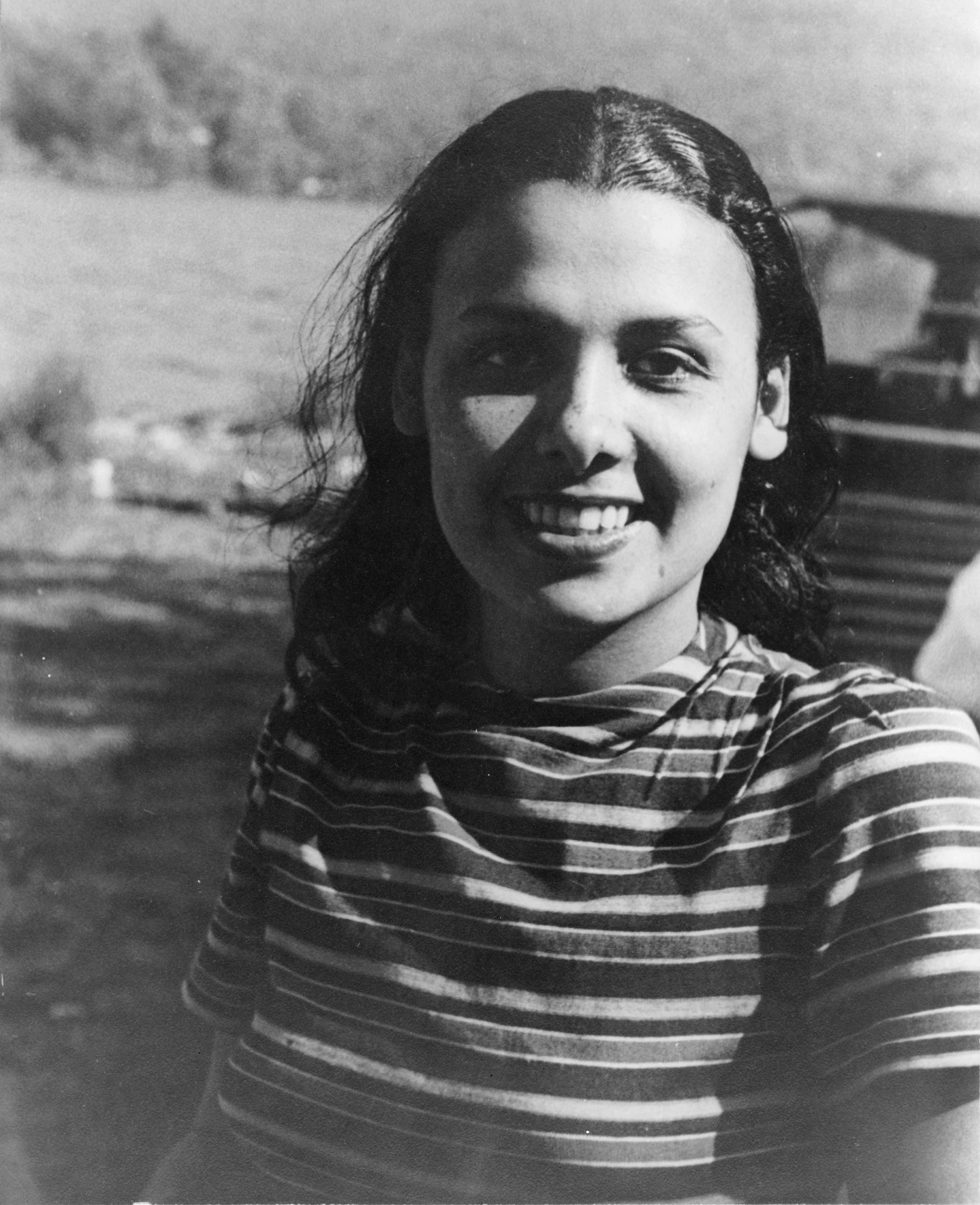
Lena Horne photographed by Carl Van Vechten, 1941

Horne already had two low-budget movies to her credit: a musical feature called The Duke is Tops (1938, later reissued with Horne's name above the title as The Bronze Venus); and a two-reel short subject, Boogie Woogie Dream (1941), featuring pianists Pete Johnson and Albert Ammons. Horne's songs from Boogie Woogie Dream were later released individually as soundies. Horne made her Hollywood nightclub debut at Felix Young's Little Troc on the Sunset Strip in January 1942. A few weeks later, she was signed by Metro-Goldwyn-Mayer. In November 1944, she was featured in an episode of the popular radio series Suspense, as a fictional nightclub singer, with a large speaking role along with her singing. In 1945 and 1946, she sang with Billy Eckstine's Orchestra.

She made her debut at Metro-Goldwyn-Mayer in Panama Hattie (1942) and performed the title song of Stormy Weather (1943) based loosely on the life of Adelaide Hall, for 20th Century Fox, while on loan from MGM. She appeared in several MGM musicals, including Cabin in the Sky (1943) with an entirely African-American cast. She was otherwise not featured in a leading role because of her ethnicity and the fact that her films were required to be re-edited for showing in cities where theaters would not show films with black performers. As a result, most of Horne's film appearances were stand-alone sequences that had no bearing on the rest of the film, so editing caused no disruption to the storyline. One number from Cabin in the Sky was cut before release because it was considered too suggestive by the censors: Horne singing "Ain't It the Truth" while taking a bubble bath. This scene and song are featured in the film That's Entertainment! III (1994), which also featured commentary from Horne on why the scene was deleted prior to the film's release. Horne was the first African-American person elected to serve on the Screen Actors Guild board of directors.

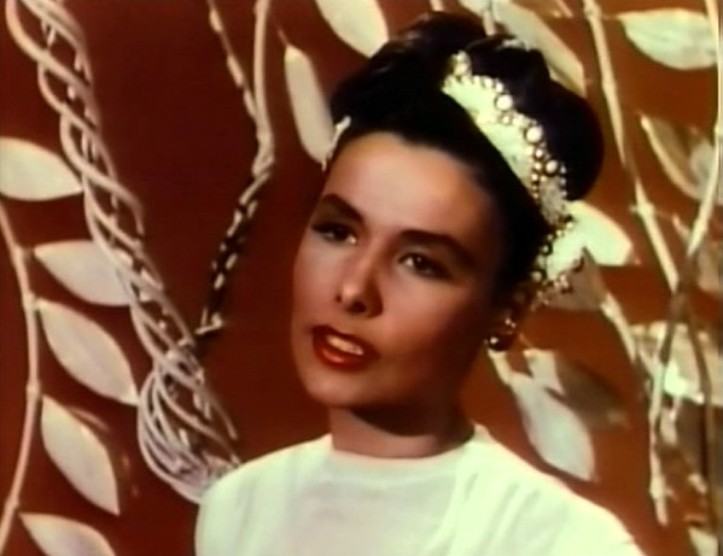
Horne singing "Why Was I Born?" in Till the Clouds Roll By (1946)

In Ziegfeld Follies (1946), she performed "Love" by Hugh Martin and Ralph Blane. Horne lobbied for the role of Julie LaVerne in MGM's version of Show Boat (1951), having already played the role when a segment of Show Boat was performed in Till the Clouds Roll By, but lost the part to Ava Gardner, a friend in real life. Horne claimed this was due to the Production Code's ban on interracial relationships in films, although MGM sources state she was never considered for the role. In the documentary That's Entertainment! III, Horne stated that MGM executives required Gardner to practice her singing using Horne's recordings, which offended both actresses. Ultimately, Gardner's voice was overdubbed by actress Annette Warren (Smith) for the theatrical release.

=== Changes of direction ===
Horne became disenchanted with Hollywood and increasingly focused on her nightclub career. She made only two major appearances for MGM during the 1950s: Duchess of Idaho (1950, which was also Eleanor Powell's final film); and the musical Meet Me in Las Vegas (1956). She said she was "tired of being typecast as a Negro who stands against a pillar singing a song. I did that 20 times too often." She was blacklisted during the 1950s for her affiliations in the 1940s with communist-backed groups. She would subsequently disavow communism. She returned to the screen, playing Claire Quintana, a madam in a brothel who marries Richard Widmark, in the film Death of a Gunfighter (1969), her first straight dramatic role with no reference to her color. She later appeared on screen two more times, as Glinda in The Wiz (1978), which was directed by her then son-in-law Sidney Lumet, and co-hosting the MGM retrospective That's Entertainment! III (1994), in which she related her unkind treatment by the studio.

After leaving Hollywood, Horne established herself as one of the premier nightclub performers of the post-war era. She headlined at clubs and hotels throughout the US, Canada, and Europe, including the Sands Hotel in Las Vegas, the Cocoanut Grove in Los Angeles, and the Waldorf-Astoria in New York. In 1957, a live album entitled Lena Horne at the Waldorf-Astoria became the biggest-selling record by a female artist in the history of the RCA Victor label at that time. In 1958, Horne became the first African-American woman to be nominated for a Tony Award for "Best Actress in a Musical", for her part in the "Calypso" musical Jamaica (which, at Horne's request, featured her longtime friend Adelaide Hall).

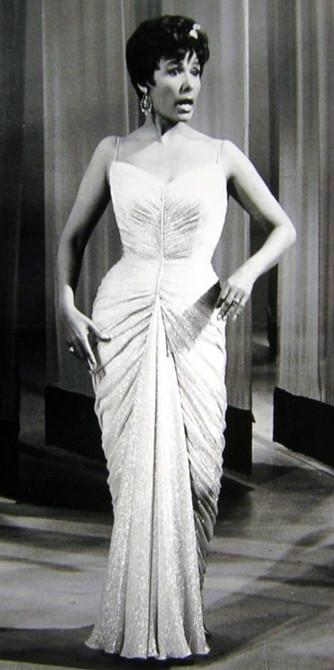
Horne performing on The Bell Telephone Hour, 1965

From the late 1950s through to the 1960s, Horne was a staple of TV variety shows, appearing multiple times on Perry Como's Kraft Music Hall, The Ed Sullivan Show, The Dean Martin Show and The Bell Telephone Hour. Other programs she appeared on included The Judy Garland Show, The Hollywood Palace and The Andy Williams Show. Besides two television specials for the BBC (later syndicated in the US), Horne starred in her own US television special in 1969, Monsanto Night Presents Lena Horne. During this decade, the artist Pete Hawley painted her portrait for RCA Victor, capturing the mood of her performance style.

In 1970, she co-starred with Harry Belafonte in the hour-long Harry & Lena special for ABC; in 1973, she co-starred with Tony Bennett in Tony and Lena. Horne and Bennett subsequently toured the US and UK in a show together. In the 1976 program America Salutes Richard Rodgers, she sang a lengthy medley of Rodgers songs with Peggy Lee and Vic Damone. Horne also made several appearances on The Flip Wilson Show. Additionally, Horne played herself on television programs such as The Muppet Show, Sesame Street and Sanford and Son in the 1970s, as well as a 1985 performance on The Cosby Show and a 1993 appearance on A Different World. In the summer of 1980, Horne, 63 years old and intent on retiring from show business, embarked on a two-month series of benefit concerts sponsored by the sorority Delta Sigma Theta. These concerts were represented as Horne's farewell tour; however, her retirement lasted less than a year.

On April 13, 1980, Horne, Luciano Pavarotti and host Gene Kelly were all scheduled to appear at a gala performance at the Metropolitan Opera House to salute the NY City Center's Joffrey Ballet Company. However, Pavarotti's plane was diverted over the Atlantic and he was unable to appear. James Nederlander was an invited Honored Guest and observed that only three people at the sold-out Metropolitan Opera House asked for their money back. He asked to be introduced to Horne following her performance. In May 1981, The Nederlander Organization, Michael Frazier and Fred Walker went on to book Horne for a four-week engagement at the newly named Nederlander Theatre on West 41st Street in New York City. The show was an instant success and was extended to a full year run, garnering Horne a special Tony award and two Grammy Awards for the cast recording of her show Lena Horne: The Lady and Her Music. The 333-performance Broadway run closed on Horne's 65th birthday, June 30, 1982. Later that week, she performed the entire show again to record it for television broadcast and home video release. Horne began a tour a few days later at Tanglewood (Massachusetts) during the weekend of July 4, 1982. The Lady and Her Music toured 41 cities in the US and Canada until June 17, 1984. It played in London for a month in August and ended its run in Stockholm, Sweden, on September 14, 1984. In 1981 she received a Special Tony Award for the show, which also played to acclaim at the Adelphi Theatre in London in 1984. Despite the show's considerable success (Horne still holds the record for the longest-running solo performance in Broadway history), she did not capitalize on the renewed interest in her career by undertaking many new musical projects. A proposed 1983 joint recording project between Horne and Frank Sinatra (to be produced by Quincy Jones) was ultimately abandoned, and her sole studio recording of the decade was 1988's The Men in My Life, featuring duets with Sammy Davis Jr. and Joe Williams. In 1989, she received the Grammy Lifetime Achievement Award.

In the 1990s, Horne released three solo albums: 1994's Grammy nominated "We'll Be Together Again" studio album, 1995's "An Evening with Lena Horne" live album, which won Horne a Grammy Award for Best Jazz Vocal Album, and 1998's Being Myself, Horne's final studio album. Thereafter, Horne retired from performing and largely retreated from public view, though in 2000, Horne's vocals were featured on Simon Rattle's Classic Ellington album, and in 2006, a compilation album, entitled "Seasons of a Life" featuring various outtakes from Horne's 1990s recording sessions with Blue Note records was released.

== Civil rights activism ==
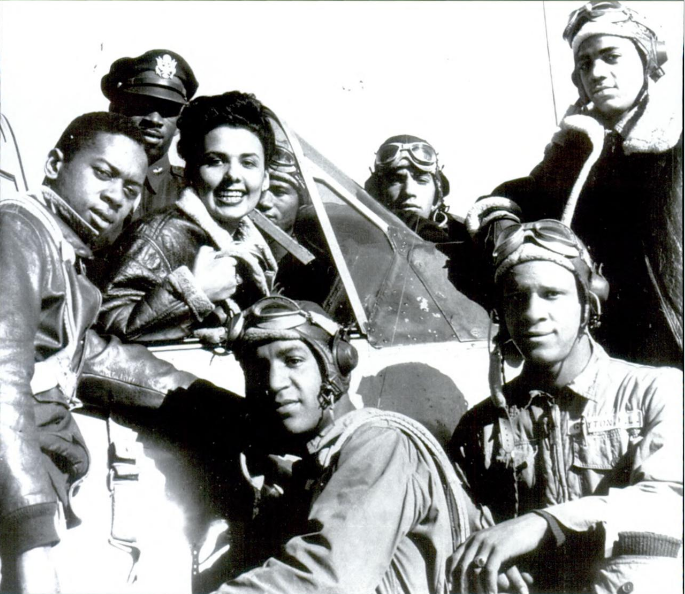
Lena Horne posing with the Tuskegee Airmen in Tuskegee, Alabama, during World War II (Note: Lena Horne performed for members of the United States military many times. Often she was required to perform for white troops first. She could only perform for the black troops the next day in a separate blacks-only mess hall. She performed for the first black pilots (the Tuskegee Airmen) many times during World War II.)

Horne was long involved with the civil rights movement. In 1941, she sang at Café Society, New York City's first integrated venue, and worked with Paul Robeson. During World War II, when entertaining the troops for the USO, she refused to perform "for segregated audiences or for groups in which German POWs were seated in front of Black servicemen", according to her Kennedy Center biography. Because the US Army refused to allow integrated audiences, she staged her show for a mixed audience of Black US soldiers and white German POWs. Seeing the Black soldiers had been forced to sit in the back seats, she walked off the stage to the first row where the Black troops were seated and performed with the Germans behind her. However, the USO observed at the time of her death that Horne did in fact tour "extensively with the USO during WWII on the West Coast and in the South". The organization also commemorated her for the appearances she made on Armed Forces Radio Service programs Jubilee, G.I. Journal, and Command Performances. In the film Stormy Weather (1943), Horne's character would perform the film's title song as part of a big, all-star show for World War II soldiers as well. After quitting the USO in 1945, Horne financed tours of military camps herself.

Horne was at an NAACP rally with Medgar Evers in Jackson, Mississippi, the weekend before Evers was assassinated. At the March on Washington she spoke and performed on behalf of the NAACP, S.N.C.C., and the National Council of Negro Women. She also worked with Eleanor Roosevelt in attempts to pass anti-lynching laws. Tom Lehrer mentions her in his song "National Brotherhood Week" in the line "Lena Horne and Sheriff Clark are dancing cheek to cheek" referring (wryly) to her and to Sheriff Jim Clark, of Selma, Alabama, who was responsible for a violent attack on civil rights marchers in 1965. In 1983, the NAACP awarded her the Spingarn Medal.

Horne was a registered Democrat and on November 20, 1963, she, along with Democratic National Committee (D.N.C.) Chairman John Bailey, Carol Lawrence, Richard Adler, Sidney Salomon, Vice-chairwoman of the DNC Margaret B. Price, and Secretary of the DNC Dorothy Vredenburgh Bush, visited John F. Kennedy at The White House, two days prior to his assassination.

== Personal life ==
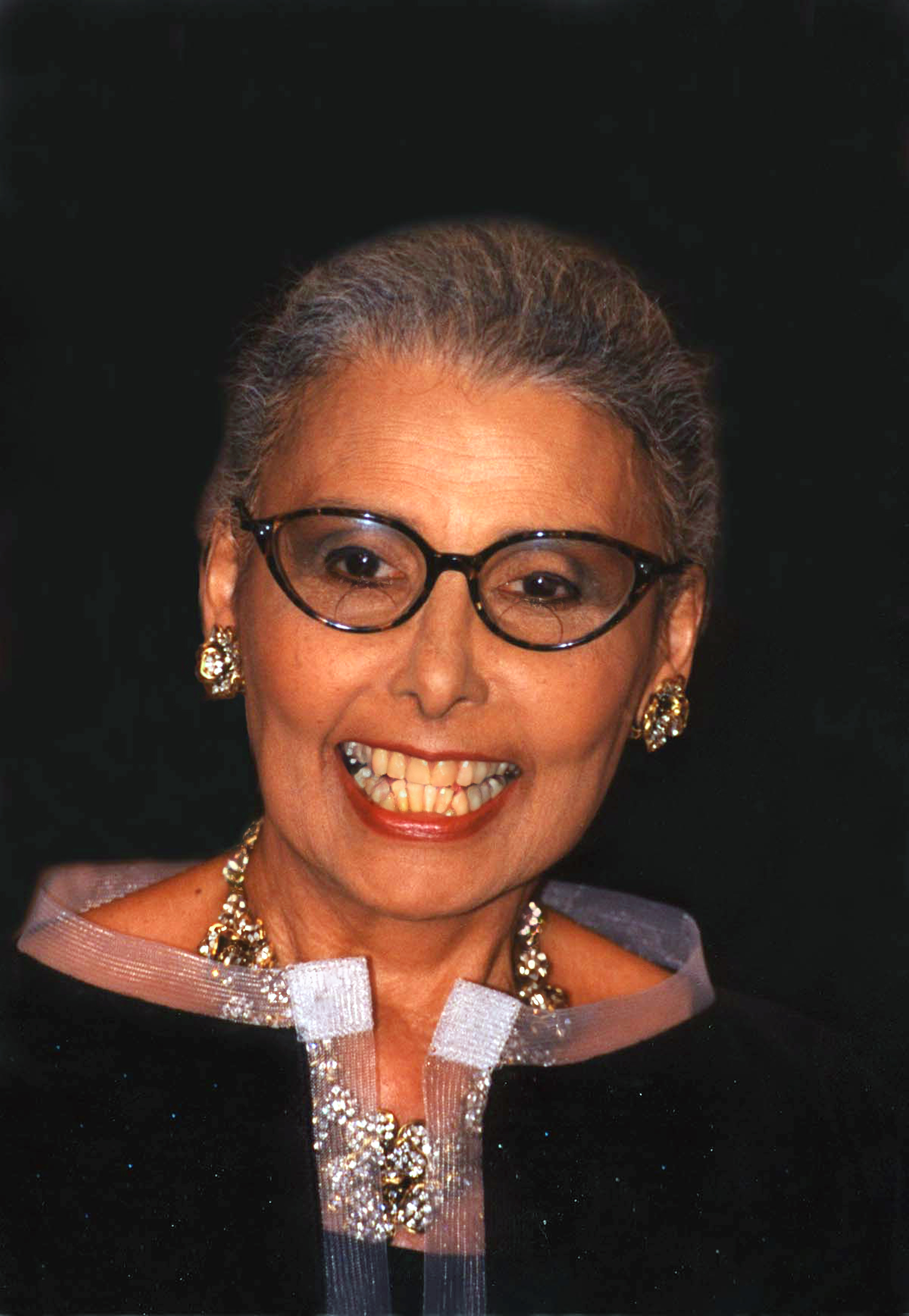
Horne at her 80th birthday party, 1997

Horne married Louis Jordan Jones, a political operative, in January 1937 in Pittsburgh. On December 21, 1937, their daughter, Gail, was born. They had a son, Edwin Jones, who died of kidney disease. Horne and Jones separated in 1940 and divorced in 1944. Horne's second marriage, in December 1947 in Paris, was to Lennie Hayton, who was music director and one of the premier musical conductors and arrangers at MGM. They separated in the early 1960s but never divorced. He died in 1971. In her as-told-to autobiography Lena by Richard Schickel, Horne recounts the enormous pressures she and her husband faced as an interracial couple. She later admitted in an interview in Ebony (May 1980) that she had married Hayton to advance her career and cross the color barrier in show business, but "learned to love him very much".

Horne had affairs with long-time heavyweight champion Joe Louis, musician and actor Artie Shaw, actor Orson Welles, and director Vincente Minnelli.

Horne also had a long and close relationship with musician Billy Strayhorn, and said she would have married him if Strayhorn were heterosexual. He was also an important professional mentor to Horne.

Among her close friends was author Rex Stout, creator of the mystery series featuring the fictional detective Nero Wolfe. She first met Stout in the early 1950s when their daughters were classmates at a Quaker boarding school in upstate New York. In 1996, Horne wrote the Introduction to a new edition of Stout's novel Champagne for One.

Screenwriter Jenny Lumet, known for her award-winning screenplay Rachel Getting Married, is Horne's granddaughter, the daughter of filmmaker Sidney Lumet and Horne's daughter Gail. Her other grandchildren include Gail's other daughter, Amy Lumet, and her son's four children, Thomas, William, Samadhi and Lena. Her great-grandchildren include Jake Cannavale.

Horne was Catholic. From 1946 to 1962 she resided in St. Albans, Queens, New York, enclave of prosperous African Americans, where she counted among her neighbors Count Basie, Ella Fitzgerald and other jazz luminaries. In the 1980s, she moved into the fifth floor of the Volney, a hotel turned co-op, at 23 East 74th Street.

== Death ==
Lena Horne died of congestive heart failure at age 92 on May 9, 2010. Her funeral took place at St. Ignatius Loyola Church on Park Avenue in New York, where she had been a member. Thousands gathered and attendees included Leontyne Price, Dionne Warwick, Liza Minnelli, Jessye Norman, Chita Rivera, Cicely Tyson, Diahann Carroll, Leslie Uggams, Lauren Bacall, Robert Osborne, Audra McDonald and Vanessa Williams. Her remains were cremated.

== Legacy ==
In 2003, ABC announced that Janet Jackson would star as Horne in a television biographical film. In the weeks following Jackson's "wardrobe malfunction" debacle during the 2004 Super Bowl, however, Variety reported that Horne had demanded Jackson be dropped from the project. "ABC executives resisted Horne's demand", according to the Associated Press report, "but Jackson representatives told the trade newspaper that she left willingly after Horne and her daughter, Gail Lumet Buckley, asked that she not take part." Oprah Winfrey stated to Alicia Keys during a 2005 interview on The Oprah Winfrey Show that she might possibly consider producing the biopic herself, casting Keys as Horne.

In January 2005, Blue Note Records, her label for more than a decade, announced that "the finishing touches have been put on a collection of rare and unreleased recordings by the legendary Horne made during her time on Blue Note." Remixed by her long-time producer Rodney Jones, the recordings featured Horne with a remarkably secure voice for a woman of her years, and include versions of such signature songs as "Something to Live For", "Chelsea Bridge", and "Stormy Weather". The album, originally titled Soul but renamed Seasons of a Life, was released on January 24, 2006. In 2007, Horne was portrayed by Leslie Uggams as the older Lena and Nikki Crawford as the younger Lena in the stage musical Stormy Weather staged at the Pasadena Playhouse in California (January to March 2009). In 2011, Horne was also portrayed by actress Ryan Jillian in a one-woman show titled Notes from A Horne staged at the Susan Batson studio in New York City, from November 2011 to February 2012. The 83rd Academy Awards presented a tribute to Horne by actress Halle Berry at the ceremony held February 27, 2011.

In 2018, a forever stamp depicting Horne began to be issued; this made Horne the 41st honoree in the Black Heritage stamp series.

In June 2021, the Prospect Park bandshell in Brooklyn was renamed the Lena Horne Bandshell to honor Horne, a Bed–Stuy Brooklyn native, and to show solidarity with the Black community.

The Nederlander Organization announced in June 2022 that Broadway's Brooks Atkinson Theatre would be renamed after her later that year. The theater's marquee was unveiled on November 1, 2022. The theater is now called the Lena Horne Theatre, which means Horne is the first Black woman to have a Broadway theater named after her.

== Awards ==
=== Grammy Awards ===
Lena Horne Grammy Award History
1961	Lena Horne at the Sands	Best Vocal Performance Album, Female	Nominated
1962	Porgy and Bess	Best Solo Vocal Performance, Female	Nominated
1981	Lena Horne: The Lady and Her Music	Best Pop Vocal Performance, Female	Won
1981	Lena Horne: The Lady and Her Music	Best Cast Show Album	Won
1988	The Men in My Life	Best Jazz Vocal Performance	Nominated
1988	"I Won't Leave You Again" (with Joe Williams)	Best Jazz Vocal Performance, Duo or Group	Nominated
1989		Lifetime Achievement Award	Won
1995	An Evening with Lena Horne	Best Jazz Vocal Performance	Won

=== Other awards ===
Year	Organization	Category	Result	Notes
1957	Tony Awards	Best Actress	Nominee	Jamaica
1980	Howard University	Honorary doctorate	Honored	
1980	Drama Desk Awards	Outstanding Actress – Musical	Won	Lena Horne: The Lady and Her Music
1980	New York Drama Critics Circle Awards	Special Citation	Won	Lena Horne: The Lady and Her Music
1981	Tony Awards	Special Citation	Won	Lena Horne: The Lady and Her Music
1984	John F. Kennedy Center for the Performing Arts	Kennedy Center Honors	Won	For extraordinary talent, creativity, and perseverance
1985	Emmy Award	Lena Horne: The Lady and Her Music	Nominee	
1987	American Society of Composers, Authors and Publishers	The ASCAP Pied Piper Award	Won	Given to entertainers who have made significant contributions to words and music
1994	Sammy Cahn Lifetime Achievement Award	Songwriters Hall of Fame	Won	
1997	Society of Singers	Society of Singers Lifetime Achievement Award	Won	for "whom singers are awarded for their contribution to the world of music along with their dedicated efforts to benefit the community and worldwide causes"
1999	NAACP Image Award	Outstanding Jazz Artist	Won	
2006	Martin Luther King Jr. National Historic Site	International Civil Rights Walk of Fame	Inducted	
?	Hollywood Chamber of Commerce	Hollywood Walk of Fame	Won	Honor (motion pictures)
?	Hollywood Chamber of Commerce	Hollywood Walk of Fame	Won	Honor (recordings)

== Filmography ==
=== Film ===
- Cab Calloway's Jitterbug Party (1935, short subject)
- The Duke Is Tops (1938)
- Panama Hattie (1942)
- Cabin in the Sky (1943)
- Stormy Weather (1943)
- Thousands Cheer (1943)
- I Dood It (1943)
- Swing Fever (1943)
- Boogie-Woogie Dream (1944, short subject filmed in 1941)
- Broadway Rhythm (1944)
- Two Girls and a Sailor (1944)
- Studio Visit (1946) (short subject; featuring outtake from Cabin in the Sky)
- Till the Clouds Roll By (1946)
- Ziegfeld Follies (1946)
- Words and Music (1948)
- Some of the Best (1949, short subject)
- Duchess of Idaho (1950)
- Meet Me in Las Vegas (1956)
- The Heart of Show Business (1957, short subject)
- Now! (1965) (short subject, voice only)
- Death of a Gunfighter (1969)
- The Wiz (1978)
- That's Entertainment! III (1994)
- Strange Frame (archive footage, 2012)

=== Television ===
- What's My Line? (as Mystery Guest, September 27, 1953)
- Ed Sullivan Show (January 6, 1957)
- "What's My Line?" (as Mystery Guest, March 2, 1958)
- The Judy Garland Show (as herself, October 13, 1963)
- The Perry Como Show (as herself, March 5, 1965)
- Sesame Street (as herself, Episode #5.1, November 19, 1973)
- Sanford & Son ("A Visit from Lena Horne" as herself, #2. January 12, 1973)
- The Muppet Show (as herself, 1976)
- Sesame Street (as herself, Episode #7.76, March 15, 1976)
- The Cosby Show ("Cliff's Birthday" as herself, May 9, 1985)
- A Different World ("A Rock, a River, a Lena" as herself, July 1993)

== See also ==
- List of people from Harlem

== Bibliography ==
- Gavin, James, Stormy Weather: The Life of Lena Horne. Atria, 2009. ISBN 978-0-7432-7143-1.
- Haskins, James, and Kathleen Benson, Lena, Stein and Day, 1984. ISBN 0-8128-2853-4.
- Horne, Lena, and Richard Schickel, Lena, Doubleday, 1965. ISBN 978-0-385-08034-7.
- Williams, Iain Cameron Underneath a Harlem Moon: The Harlem to Paris Years of Adelaide Hall (Archived February 26, 2021, at the Wayback Machine). Bloomsbury Publishers, ISBN 0-8264-5893-9.
