= Lena: A New Album =

Studio album by Lena Horne
- Released: 1976
- Recorded: 1976
- Genre: Traditional pop
- Length: 52:02
- Label: RCA Records
- Producers: Nat Shapiro, Norman Schwartz

Lena Horne chronology
Lena & Michel (1975)	Lena: A New Album (1976)	Lena Horne: The Lady and Her Music (1981)

Professional ratings
Review scores
Source	Rating
Allmusic	2/5 stars

Lena: A New Album is a 1976 studio album by Lena Horne, arranged by Robert Farnon.

== Track listing ==
1. "I've Grown Accustomed to His Face" (Alan Jay Lerner, Frederick Loewe) – 3:55
2. "Someone to Watch Over Me" (George Gershwin, Ira Gershwin) – 4:30
3. "My Funny Valentine" (Lorenz Hart, Richard Rodgers) – 3:39
4. "Some Day My Prince Will Come" (Frank Churchill, Larry Morey) – 4:18
5. "I've Got the World on a String" (Harold Arlen, Ted Koehler) – 5:33
6. "Softly, as I Leave You" (Hal Shaper, Antonio DeVito, Giorgio Calabrese) – 3:48
7. "I Have Dreamed" (Oscar Hammerstein II, Rodgers) – 4:46
8. "A Flower Is a Lovesome Thing" (Billy Strayhorn) – 3:18
9. "I've Got to Have You" (Kris Kristofferson) – 3:52
10. "My Ship" (I. Gershwin, Kurt Weill) – 5:20

== Personnel ==
=== Performance ===
- Lena Horne – vocals
- Chris Laurence – double bass
- David Snell – harp
- Gordon Beck – keyboards
- Phil Woods – saxophone
- Raymond Cohen – violin
- Robert Farnon – arranger, conductor, orchestration
- Lennie Hayton – arranger

=== Production ===
- Dick Heckstall-Smith – art direction
- Acy Lehman
- Arlene Chapman – assistant producer
- Sherman Sneed – assistant
- Keith Grant – engineer, digital editing, editing, mixing, technical supervisor
- Nat Shapiro – executive producer
- David Ades – liner notes
- Nat Peck – orchestra assembly
- Richard Avedon – photography
- Norman Schwartz – producer
