= Cora Catherine Calhoun Horne =

African-American suffragist, civil rights activist, socialite (1865–1932)

- Born: Cora Catherine Calhoun; November 1865; Atlanta, Georgia, US
- Died: September 23, 1932 (aged 66); Brooklyn, New York, US
- Other names: Cora Calhoun, Cora Calhoun Horne
- Education: Atlanta University
- Known for: Black suffragist, civil rights activist, socialite
- Spouse: Edwin Horne (married 1887)
- Children: 4

Cora Catherine Calhoun Horne (November 1865 – September 23, 1932) was an African-American suffragist, civil rights activist, and an Atlanta socialite. She was an early member of the National Association for the Advancement of Colored People (NAACP) and a founding member of the National Association of Colored Women (NACW). She was the grandmother of entertainer Lena Horne and raised Horne when she was young.

== History ==
Horne was born in November 1865 in Atlanta, Georgia, to parents Atlanta Mary (née Fernando) and Moses Calhoun. She was the oldest of two children, her younger sister was named Lena. Her father had been the house slave butler to Andrew Bonaparte Calhoun, of Georgia. Moses later opened a small grocery, followed by a restaurant, boardinghouse, and land ownership, which ushered the family into the Black middle class. She and her sister attended Storrs Elementary School in Atlanta. She was baptized as a Catholic, but the family later attended First Congregational Church, which like her school was associated with the American Missionary Association (AMA). She was later confirmed at St. Benedict the Moor Church. Calhoun attended Atlanta University and studied education, graduating in 1881.

Horne was a socialite, active in Atlanta Society. She and Edwin Horne (1859–1939) married on October 26, 1887, in Birmingham, Alabama. Together they had four children Errol Stanley (1889–1918), Edwin "Teddy" Fletcher (1893–1970), Frank Smith (1899–1974), and John Burke (1905–1971). After marriage, the couple moved to Chattanooga, Tennessee. In 1896, they became disillusioned with the South and the segregation and moved to the West 50s Streets in New York City, which was known as "Black Bohemia" at the time. Later the family settled down at 189 Chauncey Street in Brooklyn, New York.

In the 1890s, she was a founding member of the Horne National Association of Colored Women (NACW). The Hornes were early members of the National Association for the Advancement of Colored People (NAACP). She was additionally active in many other organizations including the Young Women's Christian Association (YWCA, starting in 1913), Brooklyn League on Urban Conditions (1918), the Big Brother and Big Sister Federation (1918), and the National Republican Women's Auxiliary (c.1924).

Horne was the paternal grandmother to Lena Horne, who, along with her spouse primarily raised Lena when she was a child in the 1920s. When her granddaughter was living with her, Horne took her to NAACP meetings starting at age 2 and immersed her in learning about civic causes.
