= Guy Kelly =

American jazz musician (1906–1940)

Guy Kelly (November 22, 1906 – February 24, 1940) was an American jazz trumpeter and singer.

== Life and career ==
Guy Edgar Kelly was born in Scotlandville, Louisiana on November 22, 1906. In his early career he performed in Baton Rouge, Louisiana with a band led by Toots Johnson before going to New Orleans to play in Papa Celestin's band in 1927-1928. In New Orleans he would regularly perform in trumpet duels with Red Allen. In 1929, he went on tour as a member of Kid Howard's band, and then joined Boyd Atkins's band in the summer of 1930.

By 1931, Kelly had moved to Chicago where he was working with Cassino Simpson and Erskine Tate. Other Chicago musicians he worked with in the 1930s included banjoist Ed Carry (1932), Dave Peyton (1934), Tiny Parham (1934), Carroll Dickerson (1934, 1937–1938), Jimmie Noone (1935-1936), and Albert Ammons (1935-1936, 1939 and 1940s).

Kelly appears on the Noone classic "The Blues Jumped a Rabbit", recorded Chicago January 15, 1936. Kelly died February 24, 1940.
