= Hociel Thomas =

American vaudevillian, blues and jazz singer (1904–1952)

Hociel Thomas (July 10, 1904 – August 22, 1952) was an American blues singer and pianist in the classic female blues style.

== Early life ==
Born in Houston, Texas, United States, her father, George Washington Thomas, was a musician, songwriter, and music publisher. Around 1916, she relocated to New Orleans, Louisiana, to live with her aunt, the blues singer Sippie Wallace. She began performing, often with Sippie Wallace, at local parties and in Storyville, the city's red-light district.

== Career ==
She moved to Chicago, Illinois, in about 1924 and worked in local clubs and theatres there until the early 1930s. In 1925, she recorded for Gennett Records, and in 1925–26 she recorded several sides for the Okeh label, and—along with vocalist Lillie Delk Christian—released Last Night I Dreamed You Kissed Me. Her accompanists on the Okeh recordings included her teenaged uncle Hersal Thomas, whose piano is heard on "Fish Tail Dance" and four other sides, and Louis Armstrong.

During the years of the Great Depression her career diminished, and she worked outside music. In the early 1940s, she moved to Oakland, California. In 1946, she recorded seven songs as pianist and vocalist with Mutt Carey for the Circle label, which were her last recordings. She worked with Kid Ory's Orchestra in San Francisco In 1948.

In 1948 or 1949, she engaged in a brawl with one of her sisters, in which she lost her eyesight and her sister was killed. Charged with manslaughter, she was tried and acquitted. She died of heart disease on August 22, 1952. She is buried in Greenlawn Memorial Park in Colma, California.
