= The Men in My Life =

Studio album by Lena Horne
- Released: 1988
- Recorded: 1988
- Genre: Vocal jazz
- Label: Three Cherries Records
- Producer: Ettore Stratta

Lena Horne chronology
Lena Horne: The Lady and Her Music (1981)	The Men in My Life (1988)	We'll Be Together Again (1993)

Professional ratings
Review scores
Source	Rating
Allmusic	3/5 stars

The Men in My Life is a 1988 studio album by Lena Horne, featuring Horne in duet with Joe Williams and Sammy Davis Jr.

At the 31st Grammy Awards, Horne was nominated for the Grammy Award for Best Jazz Vocal Performance - Female, for her performance on this album.

== Track listing ==
1. "I Wish I'd Met You" (Johnny Mandel, Richard Rodney Bennett, Frank Underwood) (With Sammy Davis Jr.) - 4.15
2. "Ours" (Cole Porter) - 3.20
3. "Ev'ry Time We Say Goodbye" (Cole Porter) - 3.35
4. "A Fine Romance" (Jerome Kern, Dorothy Fields) - 3.10
5. "Roundabout" (Vernon Duke, Ogden Nash) - 3.45
6. "September Song" (Maxwell Anderson, Kurt Weill) - 3.45
7. "Joy" (Gerry Niewood) - 4.32
8. "Close Enough for Love" (Mandel, Paul Williams) - 4.07
9. "I Won't Leave You Again" (Rodney Jones) (With Joe Williams) - 5.05
10. "The Eagle and Me" (Harold Arlen, Yip Harburg) - 3.05
11. "When I Fall in Love" (Victor Young, Edward Heyman) - 4.09
12. "Look to the Rainbow" (Burton Lane, Harburg) - 4.36
13. "It Could Happen to You" (Johnny Burke, Jimmy Van Heusen) - 2.06
14. "Sing My Heart" (Arlen, Ted Koehler) - 2.55

== Personnel ==
- Mike Renzi, Frank Owens - Music directors

=== Performance ===
- Lena Horne – vocals
- Joe Williams
- Sammy Davis Jr.
