= Eddie Dougherty =

American jazz drummer

Eddie Dougherty (July 17, 1915 – December 14, 1994) was an American jazz drummer.

Dougherty played drums from age 13, working early on in Dickie Wells's band in Harlem at the beginning of the 1930s. He began recording frequently as a sideman in the 1930s, with Taft Jordan, Frank Froeba, Mildred Bailey, Harry James, Billie Holiday, Frankie Newton, Pete Johnson, and Meade Lux Lewis. Alongside this he held a gig as the drummer for Keny Watts and his Kilowatts through 1940. He subbed for Dave Tough in the Bud Freeman Orchestra in 1940, then played with Art Tatum, Joe Sullivan, Benny Carter, Benny Morton, and others in the first half of the 1940s. He worked with James P. Johnson several times, including on 1944 recording sessions. His later work included recordings with Cliff Jackson, Mary Lou Williams, Clyde Bernhardt, Wilbur De Paris, Teddy Wilson, and Albert Nicholas. He was still active into the 1980s.

== Selected albums ==
Year of release	Album title	Record label
1941	Boogie Woogie (compilation)	Columbia Records C44
