= Albert Ammons =

American boogie-woogie pianist (1907–1949)

Background information
- Born: Albert Clifton Ammons; March 1, 1907; Chicago, Illinois, U.S.
- Died: December 2, 1949 (aged 42) Chicago, Illinois, U.S.
- Genres: Jazz; blues; boogie-woogie
- Occupation: Musician
- Instrument: Piano
- Years active: 1920s–1949
- Labels: Blue Note; Delmark; Mercury; Vocalion; Solo Art; Victor; Decca; V-Disc; Commodore

Albert Clifton Ammons (March 1, 1907 – December 2, 1949) was an American pianist and player of boogie-woogie, a blues style popular from the late 1930s to the mid-1940s.

== Life and career ==
Ammons was born in Chicago, Illinois. His parents were pianists, and he had learned to play by the age of ten. His interest in boogie-woogie is attributed to his close friendship with Meade Lux Lewis and also his father's interest in the style. Both Albert and Meade would practice together on the piano in the Ammons household. From the age of ten, Ammons learned about chords by marking the depressed keys on the family pianola (player piano) with a pencil and repeated the process until he had mastered it. He also played percussion in a drum and bugle corps as a teenager and was soon performing with bands in clubs in Chicago. After World War I he became interested in the blues, learning by listening to the Chicago pianists Hersal Thomas and the brothers Alonzo and Jimmy Yancey.

In the early to mid-1920s Ammons worked as a cab driver for the Silver Taxicab Company. In 1924 he met up with his boyhood friend Meade Lux Lewis, who was also then a taxi driver. Soon the two players began working as a team, performing at club parties. Ammons started his own band at the Club DeLisa in 1934 and remained at the club for the next two years. During that time he played with a five-piece band that included Guy Kelly, Dalbert Bright, Jimmy Hoskins, and Israel Crosby. Ammons also recorded as Albert Ammons's Rhythm Kings for Decca Records in 1936. The Rhythm Kings' version of "Swanee River Boogie" sold a million copies, and their 1936 recording of "Boogie Woogie Stomp" has been described as "the first 12-bar piano based boogie-woogie, [which] was imitated by many jazz bands."

Ammons moved from Chicago to New York City, where he teamed up with another pianist, Pete Johnson. The two performed regularly at the Café Society, occasionally joined by Lewis or by other jazz musicians, including Benny Goodman and Harry James.

On December 23, 1938, Ammons appeared at Carnegie Hall with Johnson and Lewis in From Spirituals to Swing, a concert produced by John H. Hammond, which helped launch the boogie-woogie craze. Two weeks later, the record producer Alfred Lion, who had attended the concert, started Blue Note Records, recording nine Ammons solos, including "The Blues" and "Boogie Woogie Stomp", eight by Lewis and two duets in a one-day session in a rented recording studio.

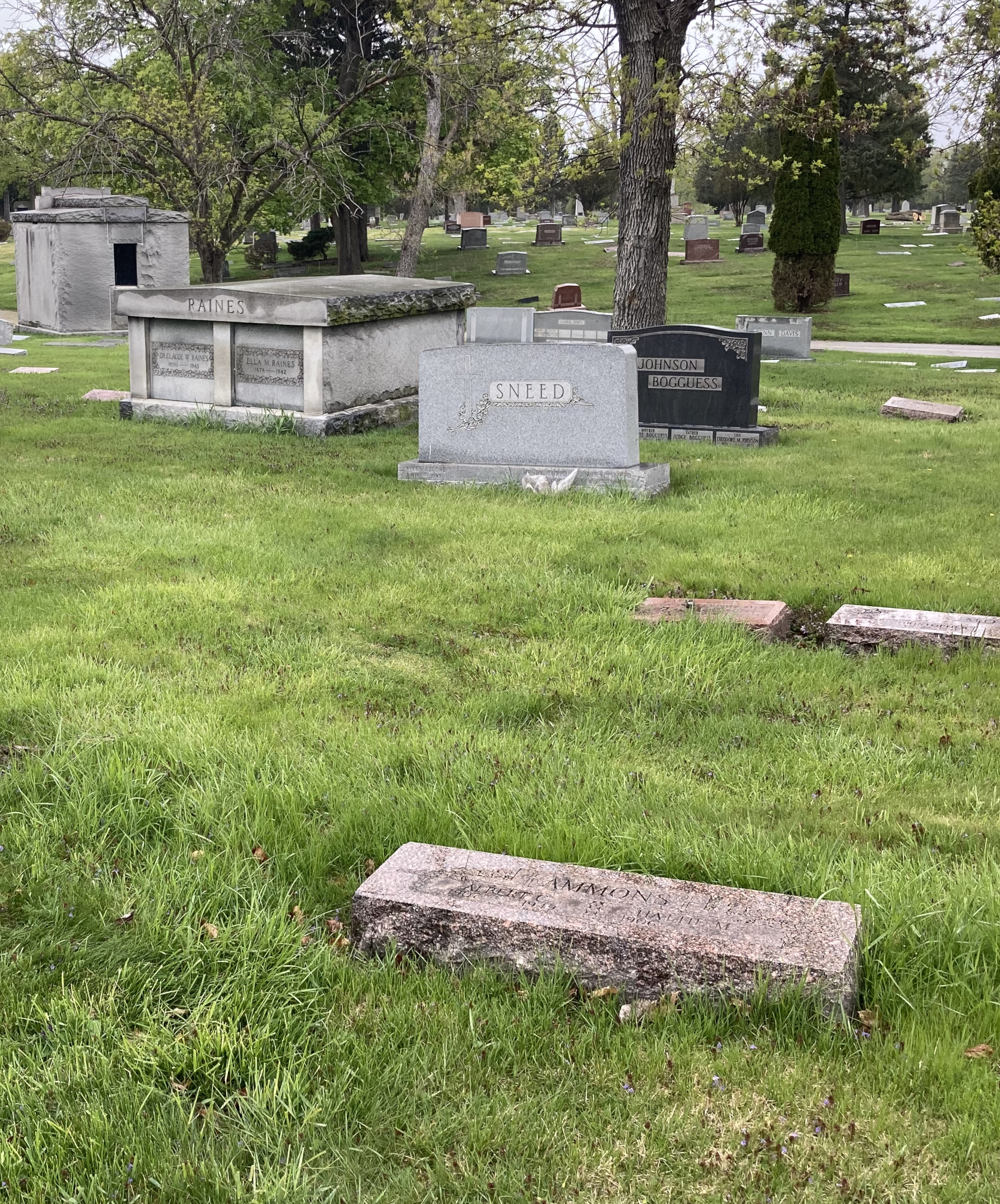
Ammons' grave at Lincoln Cemetery

In 1941, Ammons's boogie-woogie music was accompanied by drawn-on-film animation in the short film Boogie-Doodle, by Norman McLaren. Ammons played himself in the movie Boogie-Woogie Dream (1944), with Lena Horne and Johnson. As a sideman with Sippie Wallace in the 1940s Ammons recorded a session with his son, the tenor saxophonist Gene Ammons. Although the boogie-woogie fad began to die down in 1945, Ammons had no difficulty securing work. He continued to tour as a solo artist, and between 1946 and 1949 recorded his last sides, for Mercury Records, with the bassist Israel Crosby, and took on the position of staff pianist with the Lionel Hampton Orchestra. In 1949 he played at the inauguration of President Harry S. Truman.

During his last years, Ammons played mainly at the Beehive Club and the Tailspin Club in Chicago. Four days before he died, he had been at the Yancey apartment listening to Don Ewell and Jimmy Yancey play. Ammons could play only one song, having just regained the use of his hands after a temporary paralysis.

Ammons died of natural causes on December 2, 1949, in Chicago, at the age of 42. He was interred at the Lincoln Cemetery, at Kedzie Avenue in Blue Island, Illinois.

== Legacy ==
Ammons has had a wide influence on countless pianists, such as Jerry Lee Lewis, Dave Alexander, Dr. John, Hadda Brooks, Johnnie Johnson, Ray Bryant, Erroll Garner, Katie Webster and Axel Zwingenberger.

== Discography ==
=== Notable songs ===
- "Boogie Woogie Stomp"
- "Boogie Woogie Prayer"
- "Shout for Joy"
- "Woo-Woo" (1939) (Columbia 35958, C44-2)

=== Selected albums ===
Year released	Title	Label	Notes
1941	Boogie Woogie	Columbia	Compilation
1941	8 to the Bar	RCA Victor	With Pete Johnson
1948	King of Boogie Woogie (1939–1949)	Blues Classics	
1951	Boogie Woogie Classics	Blue Note	
1975	King of Blues and Boogie Woogie 1907–1949	Oldie Blues	
1982	King of Blues and Boogie Woogie 1907–1949 Vol. 2	Oldie Blues	
1992	The First Day	Blue Note	
2004	The Boogie Woogie Trio, Vols. 1–2	Storyville	

== Bibliography ==
- Page, Christopher I. (1997). Boogie Woogie Stomp: Albert Ammons & His Music. ISBN 978-1885066329.

== See also ==
- List of blues musicians
- List of boogie woogie musicians
- List of jazz pianists
- List of Mercury Records artists
