= Swansons Landing, Texas =

- Interactive map of Swansons Landing, Texas
- Coordinates: 32°40′30″N 94°03′22″W
- Country: United States
- State: Texas
- County: Harrison
- Area codes: 903, 430

Swansons Landing is a settlement and former inland port in Harrison County, Texas, United States, south of Caddo Lake.
