= Sippie Wallace =

American blues singer-songwriter (1898–1986)

Background information
- Born: Beulah Belle Thomas; November 1, 1898; Plum Bayou, Jefferson County, Arkansas, U.S.
- Died: November 1, 1986 (aged 88) Detroit, Michigan
- Genres: Blues, jazz
- Occupations: Singer, pianist, organist, songwriter
- Instruments: Piano, organ
- Years active: c. 1918–1986
- Labels: Okeh, Victor, Alligator, Storyville, Atlantic, Spivey

Sippie Wallace (born Beulah Belle Thomas; November 1, 1898 – November 1, 1986) was an American blues singer, pianist and songwriter. Her early career in tent shows gained her the billing "The Texas Nightingale". Between 1923 and 1927, she recorded over 40 songs for Okeh Records, many written by her or her brothers, George and Hersal Thomas. Her accompanists included Louis Armstrong, Johnny Dodds, Sidney Bechet, King Oliver, and Clarence Williams. Among the top female blues vocalists of her era, Wallace ranked with Ma Rainey, Ida Cox, Alberta Hunter, and Bessie Smith.

In the 1930s, she left show business to become a church organist, singer, and choir director in Detroit and performed secular music only sporadically until the 1960s, when she resumed her performing career. Wallace was nominated for a Grammy Award in 1982 and was inducted into the Michigan Women's Hall of Fame in 1993.

== Early life ==
Wallace was born in the Delta lowlands of Jefferson County, Arkansas, one of 13 children in her family. Wallace came from a musical family: her brother George Washington Thomas became a notable pianist, bandleader, composer, and music publisher; a brother Hersal Thomas, was a pianist and composer; her niece Hociel Thomas (George's daughter) was a pianist and composer.

When she was a child her family moved to Houston, Texas. In her youth she sang and played the piano in Shiloh Baptist Church, where her father was a deacon, but in the evenings she and her siblings took to sneaking out to tent shows. By the time she was in her mid-teens, they were playing in those tent shows. Performing in various Texas shows, she built a solid following as a spirited blues singer.

In 1915, Wallace moved to New Orleans, Louisiana, with Hersal. Two years later she married Matt Wallace and took his surname.

== Career ==
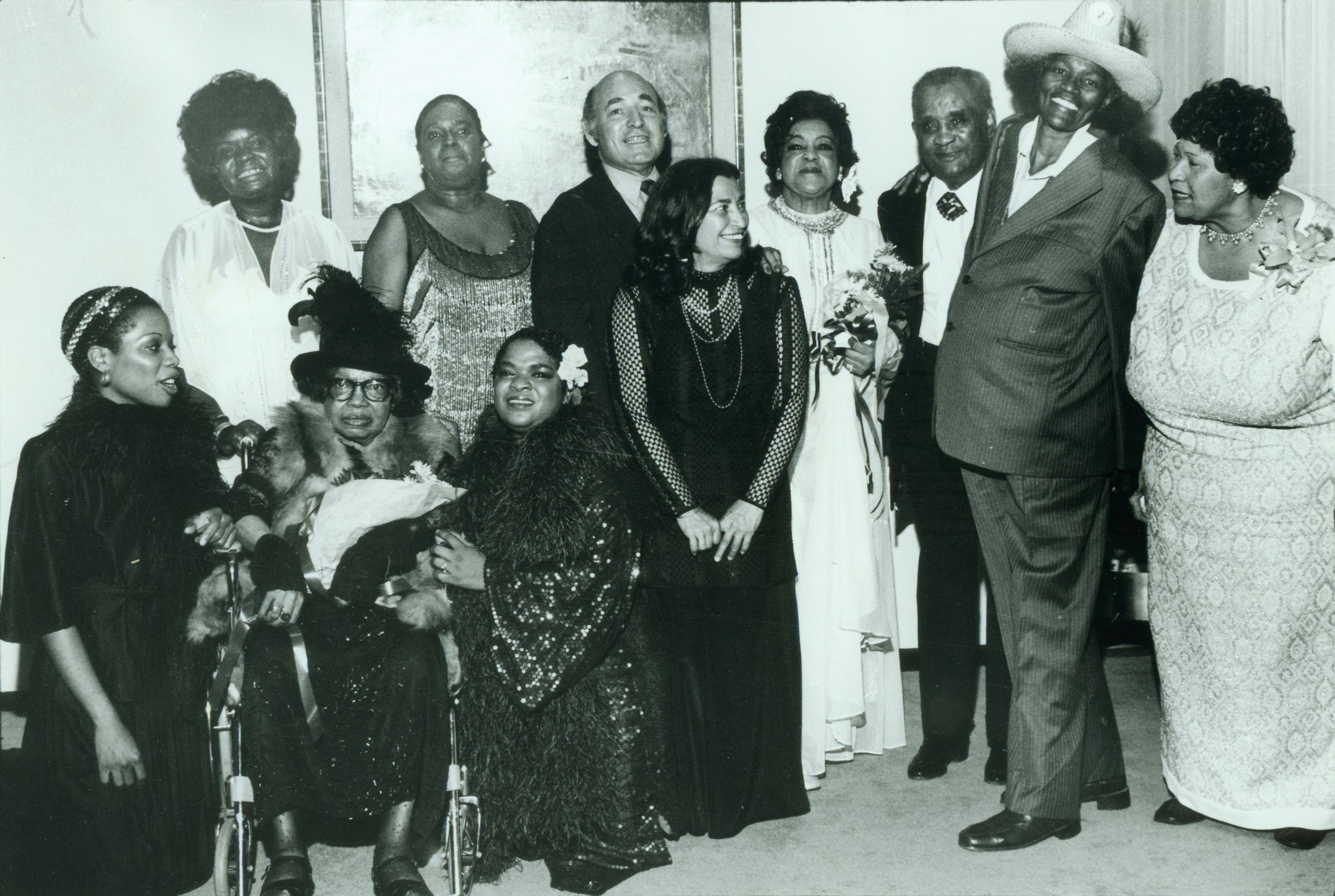
Performers of the "Blues Is a Woman" concert at the Newport Jazz Festival at Avery Fisher Hall: (standing, l to r), Koko Taylor, Linda Hopkins, producer George Wein, Rosetta Reitz, Adelaide Hall, Little Brother Montgomery, Big Mama Thornton, Beulah Bryant; (seated, l to r), Sharon Freeman, Sippie Wallace, Nell Carter (copyright Barbara Weinberg Barefield)

Wallace followed her brothers to Chicago in 1923 and worked her way into the city's bustling jazz scene. Her reputation led to a recording contract with Okeh Records in 1923. Her first recorded songs, "Shorty George" and "Up the Country Blues", the former written with her brother George, sold well enough to make her a blues star in the early 1920s. Other successful recordings followed, including "Special Delivery Blues" (with Louis Armstrong), "Bedroom Blues" (written by George and Hersal Thomas), and "I'm a Mighty Tight Woman". Hersal Thomas died of food poisoning in 1926, at age 19.

Wallace moved to Detroit in 1929. Matt Wallace died in 1936 and George Thomas Washington died on March 6, 1937.

For some 40 years, Wallace was a singer and organist at the Leland Baptist Church in Detroit. Mercury Records reissued "Bedroom Blues" in 1945. Aside from an occasional performance or recording date, she did little in the blues until she launched a comeback in 1966, after her longtime friend Victoria Spivey coaxed her out of retirement, and Wallace toured on the folk and blues festival circuit.

Wallace recorded an album, Women Be Wise, on October 31, 1966, in Copenhagen, Denmark, with Roosevelt Sykes and Little Brother Montgomery playing the piano. She recorded another album in 1966, Sings the Blues, on which she accompanied herself on piano on the title song, with Sykes or Montgomery playing piano on other tracks. Both albums include her signature song, "Women Be Wise". These recordings helped inspire the musician Bonnie Raitt to take up singing and playing the blues in the late 1960s. Raitt recorded renditions of "Women Be Wise" and "Mighty Tight Woman" on her self-titled debut album in 1971. Wallace toured and recorded with Raitt in the 1970s and 1980s and continued to perform on her own. The duo performed the song "Woman Be Wise" on Late Night with David Letterman on April 27, 1982, with Dr. John accompanying on piano, in support of her album "Sippie".

Wallace contributed to Louis Armstrong's album Louis Armstrong and the Blues Singers (1966), singing "A Jealous Woman Like Me", "Special Delivery Blues", "Jack o'Diamond Blues", "The Mail Train Blues" and "I Feel Good". She and Spivey recorded an album of blues standards, Sippie Wallace and Victoria Spivey, released in 1970 by Spivey's label, Spivey Records. In 1981, Wallace recorded the album Sippie for Atlantic Records, which earned her a 1983 Grammy nomination and won the 1982 W. C. Handy Award for Best Blues Album of the Year. Wallace's backup group was pianist James Dapogny's Chicago Jazz Band, consisting of Paul Klinger on cornet, Bob Smith on trombone and Russ Whitman and Peter Ferran on reeds.

She appeared at the Newport Folk Festival in 1966 and 1967, toured Europe with the American Folk Blues Festival in 1966, performed at the Chicago Blues Festival in 1967 and the Ann Arbor Blues Festival in 1972, and appeared at Lincoln Center in New York in 1977. She appeared in the 1982 documentary Jammin' with the Blues Greats. She shared the stage with B.B. King at the Montreaux Jazz Festival on July 22, 1982, in a performance that was filmed and later broadcast.

With the German boogie-woogie pianist Axel Zwingenberger she recorded a studio album, Axel Zwingenberger and the Friends of Boogie Woogie, Vol. 1: Sippie Wallace, in 1983 (released in 1984), which included many of her own groundbreaking compositions and other classic blues songs. In 1984 she traveled to Germany to tour with Zwingenberger, where they also recorded her only complete live album, An Evening with Sippie Wallace, for Vagabond Records.

== Death ==
In March 1986, following a concert at the Burghausen Jazz Festival in Germany, Wallace suffered a severe stroke and was hospitalized. She returned to the United States and died on her 88th birthday, at Sinai Hospital in Detroit. She is buried at Trinity Cemetery, in Detroit, Wayne County, Michigan.

== Documentary ==
In 1986, Rhapsody Films and producer Roberta Grossman released the documentary Sippie Wallace: Blues Singer and Song Writer, in which Wallace is shown in concert footage, interviews, and photographs, with historic rare recordings.

== Discography ==
=== Albums ===
Year	Title	Genre	Label
1966	Women Be Wise	Blues	Alligator
1966	Sings the Blues	Blues	Storyville
1970	Sippie Wallace and Victoria Spivey	Blues	Spivey
1982	Sippie	Blues	Atlantic
1995	Complete Recorded Works in Chronological Order, vol. 1, 1923–1925; vol. 2, 1925–1945	Blues	Document

=== 78 RPM singles - Okeh Records ===
8106A	"Shorty George Blues"	1923
8106B	"Up the Country Blues"	1923
8144A	"Underworld Blues"	1924
8144B	"Caldonia Blues"	1924
8159A	"Can Anybody Take Sweet Mama's Place?"	1924
8159B	"Stranger's Blues"	1924
8168A	"Leaving Me, Daddy Is Hard to Do"	1924
8168B	"Mama's Gone Goodbye"	1924
8177A	"Wicked Monday Morning Blues"	1924
8177B	"Sud Busting Blues"	1924
8190A	"He's the Cause of Me Being Blue"	1924
8190B	"Let My Man Alone Blues"	1924
8197A	"Off and On Blues"	1924
8197B	"I'm So Glad I'm Brownskin"	1924
8205A	"Morning Dove Blues"	1925
8205B	"Every Dog Has His Day"	1925
8206A	"Walkin Talkin Blues"	1924
8206B	"Devil Dance Blues"	1925
8212A	"Baby I Can't Use You No More"	1924
8212B	"Trouble Everywhere I Roam"	1924
8232A	"Section Hand Blues"	1925
8232B	"Parlor Social Deluxe"	1925
8243A	"Suitcase Blues"	1925
8243B	"Murder's Gonna Be My Crime"	1925
8251A	"The Man I Love"	1925
8251B	"I'm Sorry for It Now"	1925
8276A	"Advice Blues"	1925
8276B	"Being Down Don't Worry Me"	1925
8288A	"I'm Leaving You"	1925
8288B	"I've Stopped My Man"	1924
8301A	"A Man for Every Day of the Week"	1926
8301B	"Jealous Woman Like Me"	1926
8328A	"Special Delivery Blues"	1926
8328B	"Jack of Diamond Blues"	1926
8345A	"Mail Train Blues"	1926
8345B	"I Feel Good"	1926
8381A	"I Must Have It"	1925
8381B	"Kitchen Blues"	1926
8439A	"I'm a Mighty Tight Woman"	1926
8439B	"Bedroom Blues"	1926
8470	"The Flood Blues"	1927
8470	"Lazy Man Blues"	1927
8499	"Have You Ever Been Down"	1927
8499	"Dead Drunk Blues"	1927
