= Johnny Williams (bassist) =

American musician

- Born: March 13, 1908; Memphis, Tennessee, U.S.
- Died: October 23, 1998 (aged 90); New York City, New York, U.S.
- Genres: Jazz
- Instruments: Double bass, tuba

Johnny Williams Jr. (March 13, 1908 − October 23, 1998) was an American jazz tubist and double-bassist.

== Early life ==
Williams learned to play violin as a child, and switched to tuba as a teenager; he played both this instrument and the stand-up bass while playing in regional territory bands in the southern states.

== Career ==
Williams relocated to New York City in 1936, where he worked with Red Allen, Buster Bailey, Sidney Bechet, Benny Carter, J.C. Higginbotham, Billie Holiday, Harry James, James P. Johnson, the Mills Blue Rhythm Band, Frankie Newton, and Teddy Wilson. He also played in the bands of Coleman Hawkins and Louis Armstrong in the early 1940s before joining Teddy Wilson's band once again. He and Edmond Hall recorded together in 1944, and worked together until 1947; following this, Williams played with Tab Smith and then with Johnny Hodges in the mid-1950s.

From the 1960s onward, Williams was less active, though he worked occasionally with musicians such as Buddy Tate (1968), Red Richards (intermittently, 1970s), and Bob Greene (1978-82). He played with the Harlem Blues and Jazz Band from 1978 to 1998, when he had a stroke; he died later that year.
