= Pete Johnson (musician) =

American boogie-woogie and jazz pianist (1904–1967)

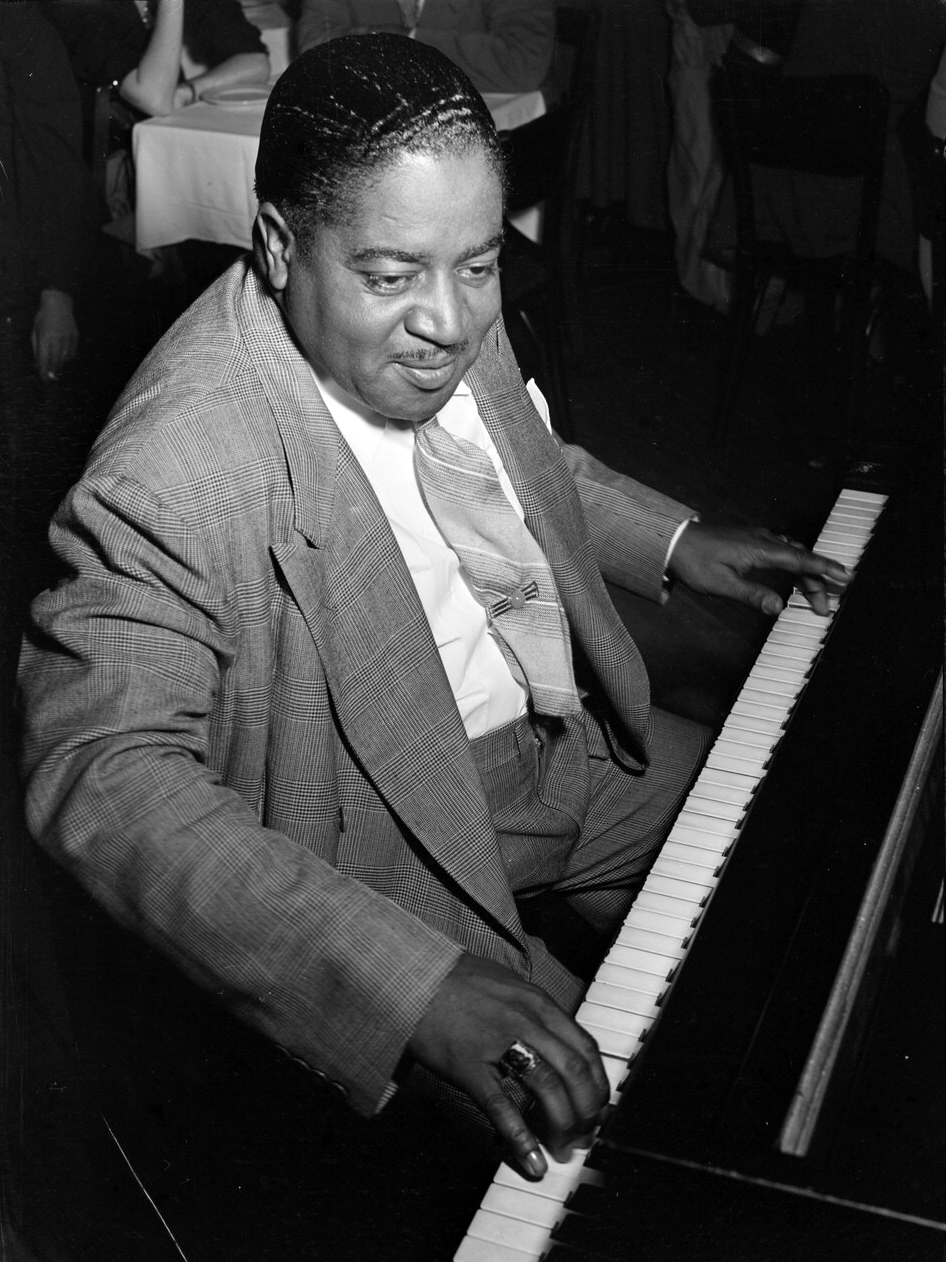
- Johnson c. August 1946

Background information
- Born: Kermit Holden Johnson; March 25, 1904; Kansas City, Missouri, U.S.
- Died: March 23, 1967 (aged 62) Buffalo, New York, U.S.
- Genres: Boogie-woogie; jazz; blues; stride
- Occupation: Musician
- Instrument: Piano
- Years active: 1922–1967

Kermit Holden "Pete" Johnson (March 25, 1904 – March 23, 1967) was an American boogie-woogie and jazz pianist.

Tony Russell stated in his book The Blues – From Robert Johnson to Robert Cray that "Johnson shared with the other members of the 'Boogie Woogie Trio' the technical virtuosity and melodic fertility that can make this the most exciting of all piano music styles, but he was more comfortable than Meade Lux Lewis in a band setting; and as an accompanist, unlike Lewis or Albert Ammons, he could sparkle but not outshine his singing partner". Scott Yanow for AllMusic, wrote: "Johnson was one of the three great boogie-woogie pianists", the others being Lewis and Ammons "whose sudden prominence in the late 1930s helped make the style very popular".

== Biography ==
Johnson was born in Kansas City, Missouri. He was raised by his mother after his father deserted the family. Things got so bad financially, Pete was placed in an orphanage when he was three. He became so homesick, however, that he ran away and returned living at home. By the age of 12, he sought out work to ease some of the financial burden at home. He worked various jobs; in a factory, a print shop, and as a shoe-shiner. He dropped out of school in the fifth grade as a result of his efforts.

Johnson began his musical career in 1922 as a drummer in Kansas City. He began piano about the same time he was learning the drums. His early piano practices took place in a church, where he was working as a water boy for a construction company. From 1926 to 1938, he worked as a pianist, often working with Big Joe Turner. An encounter with record producer John Hammond in 1936 led to an engagement at the Famous Door in New York City. In 1938, Johnson and Turner appeared in the From Spirituals to Swing concert at Carnegie Hall. After this show the popularity of the boogie-woogie style was on the upswing. Johnson worked locally and toured and recorded with Turner, Meade Lux Lewis, and Albert Ammons during this period. Ammons and Johnson appeared in the film short Boogie-Woogie Dream in 1941.

The 1938 song "Roll 'Em Pete" (composed by Johnson and Turner), featuring Turner on vocals and Johnson on piano, was one of the first rock and roll records. Another self-referential title was their "Johnson and Turner Blues." In 1948, he also wrote (w. Jack Lauderdale) and recorded "Rocket Boogie "88"/Rocket 88 Boogie", a two-sided instrumental, which influenced the 1951 Ike Turner hit, "Rocket 88".

On three dates in January 1946, Johnson recorded an early concept album, Pete Johnson's Housewarmin’, in which he starts out playing alone, supposedly in a new empty house, and is joined there by J. C. Higginbotham, J. C. Heard, and other Kansas City players. The recording also included parts played by Albert Nicholas, Hot Lips Page, Clyde Bernhardt. Budd Johnson, and a young singer, Etta Jones. Each has a solo cut backed by Johnson, and then the whole group plays a jam session together. On this album Johnson shows his considerable command of stride piano and his ability to work with a group. It was later re-released as Pete's Blues.

At a nightclub in Niagara Falls, the piano was on a platform above the bar, and Johnson had to climb a ladder to get there.

In 1950, he moved to Buffalo. He encountered some health and financial problems in this period, including losing part of a finger in an accident and being partially paralyzed by a stroke. Between January and October 1953, he was employed by an ice cream company washing trucks, but supplemented his income by performing in a trio which played at the Bamboo Room in Buffalo on weekends. Johnson experienced more of the same the following year. He washed cars at a mortuary for $25 a week. In July, however, an engagement came his way at the St. Louis Forest Park Hotel, a six-week residency as the pianist at the Circus Snack Bar. Some broadcasts were made on Saturday afternoons in a program called Saturday at the Chase. Johnson was also privately recorded on July 20 and August 1, 1954, at a pair of house parties arranged at the home of Bill Atkinson, a close friend. Things remained somewhat bleak for the next four years, except for three appearances in 1955 at the Berkshire Music Barn in Lenox, Massachusetts. But he continued to record, and toured Europe in 1958 with the Jazz at the Philharmonic ensemble, despite the fact that he was feeling unwell. While in Europe he received an invitation to appear at the Newport Jazz Festival, which he did upon his return to the States, accompanying Big Joe Turner, Chuck Berry and Big Maybelle. Johnson underwent a physical examination in August, which revealed a heart condition as well as diabetes. Several strokes followed, resulting in complete loss of mobility in both hands. Four years after the series of strokes he was still disabled and was beginning to lose his eyesight. Jazz Report magazine ran a series of record auctions to raise money for Johnson. In 1964, a longtime correspondent of his, Hans Maurer, published The Pete Johnson Story. All sales proceeds went to Johnson. After an article appeared in a 1964 issue of Blues Unlimited detailing Johnson's difficulty in receiving royalty payments other than from Blue Note and Victor, in June, Johnson was accepted as a member of ASCAP, which finally ensured that some of the royalties would be received on a regular basis.

His final live appearance was the Spirituals to Swing concert at Carnegie Hall in January 1967, his eighth and final appearance at this event. A review of the concert by Dan Morgenstern of DownBeat: "Then for the concert's most moving moment, Lieberson (the MC) escorted Pete Johnson on stage and introduced him as one of the participants in the original Spirituals to Swing and the greatest boogie-woogie pianist. Johnson had suffered a series of paralytic strokes and had not played piano for many years. His old buddy, Turner, took him by the hand, and for a moment the two middle-aged men looked touchingly like little boys. Turner dedicated 'Roll 'Em Pete' to his old friend, as Lieberson and Johnson were about to leave the stage. Instead, they stopped and the pianist seated himself next to [Ray] Bryant at the piano and began to play the treble part of his old showpiece, Bryant handling the bass. Johnson was a bit shaky but game, gaining in confidence as the number built in intensity."

Pete Johnson died two months later in Meyer Hospital, Buffalo, New York, in March 1967, two days before his 63rd birthday.

== Discography ==
=== Selected albums ===
- 1941 – Boogie Woogie (compilation), Columbia C44
- 1941 – 8 to the Bar, with Albert Ammons, RCA Victor
- 1946 – Pete's Blues, Savoy
- 1970 – Boogie Woogie Mood (1940–1944), MCA
- 1974 – Master of Blues and Boogie Woogie, Oldie Blues
- 1975 – Master of Blues and Boogie Woogie, Vol. 2, Oldie Blues
- 1982 – Master of Blues and Boogie Woogie, Vol. 3, Oldie Blues
- 1992 – King of Boogie, Milan
- 1993 – Central Avenue Boogie, Delmark
- 1996 – The Chronological Pete Johnson 1938–1939, Classics
- 1996 – The Chronological Pete Johnson 1939–1941, Classics
- 1997 – The Chronological Pete Johnson 1944–1946, Classics
- 1998 – Blues & Boogie Woogie Master 1938/1946, EPM Musique
- 1999 – Roll 'Em Pete, Pearl
- 1999 – St. Louis Parties of July 20 & August 1, 1954, Document
- 2000 – The Chronological Pete Johnson 1947–1949, Classics
- 2001 – Atomic Boogie: The National Recordings 1945–1947, Savoy Jazz

=== Anthologies ===
- 1983 – Boogie Woogie, Murray Hill three LPs collection, primarily from Columbia Records and its labels
- 1994 – The Boogie Woogie Boys, Magpie Records
- 1995 – Boogie Woogie Giants, Jazz Hour
- 2005 – Boogie Woogie, Membran (10 discs)
- 2008 – Boogie Woogie and Blues Piano, Mosaic Select 30, three discs

== See also ==
- First rock and roll record
- Kansas City jazz
