= Lena Horne discography =

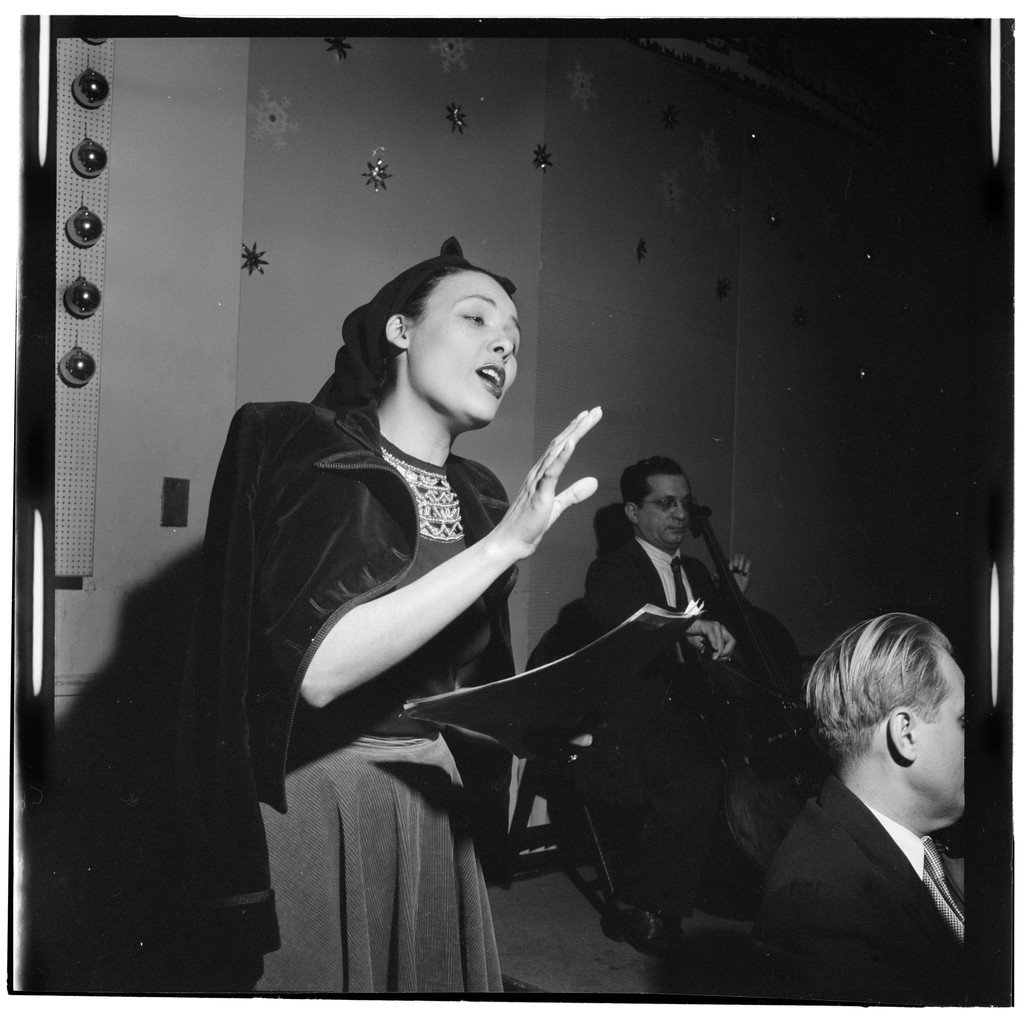
- Lena Horne, circa 1946-1948.
- Studio albums: 24
- Soundtrack albums: 1
- Live albums: 4
- Compilation albums: 19
- Singles: 39

The discography of American singer, actress and civil rights activist, Lena Horne, contains 24 studio albums, four live albums, one soundtrack album, 19 compilation albums and 39 singles. Her first recording was "Stormy Weather" issued in 1942, which reached number 21 on the US Music Popularity chart. While a series of records were issued by RCA Victor, Black & White and MGM, only two more releases made the US chart during the 1940s: "One for My Baby (and One More for the Road)" and "'Deed I Do". In 1955, "Love Me or Leave Me" rose to number 19 on the US Hot 100, becoming among Horne's highest-peaking singles in her career.

Horne's first LP for RCA Victor, It's Love was issued in 1955. Her 1957 live LP, Lena Horne at the Waldorf Astoria was her first to make the US Billboard 200, rising to number 24. Her 1958 studio LP, Give the Lady What She Wants rose to number 20 on the same chart. Her highest-peaking US LP was a collaboration with Harry Belafonte in 1959 titled Porgy and Bess, which peaked at number 13. In 1963, the CRC Charter label issued two studio albums: Lena Horne Sings Your Requests and Lena Like Latin. Another studio album by 20th Century Fox in 1963 spawned the single "Now!", which rose into the US Hot 100 and was Horne's only song to make the US R&B singles chart, peaking at number 18. The United Artists label issued three studio LP's including Merry from Lena in 1966.

Horne's 1970 collaboration with Gábor Szabó titled Lena & Gabor climbed to number 162 on the US Billboard 200. Spawned from the album was the single, "Watch What Happens", which rose into the US Bubbling Under Hot 100 chart at number 19 (her final single to chart). During the decade RCA released three studio albums by Horne including Harry & Lena (her second with Harry Belafonte) and Lena: A New Album. In 1981, Lena Horne: The Lady and Her Music was released by Qwest Records and reached number 162 on the US Billboard 200. In 1988, The Men in My Life featured a single in collaboration with Sammy Davis, Jr. titled "I Wish I'd Met You". During the 1990s, Blue Note Records issued several more studio and live albums by Horne, including the final released during her lifetime: Being Myself (1998).

== Albums ==
=== Studio albums ===
List of studio albums, with selected chart positions, and other relevant details
Title	Album details	Peak chart positions	
Title	Album details	US	US Jazz
Moanin' Low	Released: 1942; Label: RCA Victor; Formats: Shellac	—	—
It's Love	Released: 1955; Label: RCA Victor; Formats: LP	—	—
Stormy Weather	Released: 1957; Label: RCA Victor; Formats: LP	—	—
Give the Lady What She Wants	Released: 1958; Label: RCA Victor; Formats: LP	20	—
Songs by Burke and Van Heusen	Released: 1959; Label: RCA Victor; Formats: LP	—	—
Porgy and Bess (with Harry Belafonte)	Released: 1959; Label: RCA Victor; Formats: LP	13	—
Lena on the Blue Side	Released: 1962; Label: RCA Victor; Formats: LP	102	—
Lena...Lovely and Alive	Released: 1962; Label: RCA Victor; Formats: LP	102	—
Lena Horne Sings Your Requests	Released: 1963; Label: CRC Charter; Formats: LP	—	—
Lena Like Latin	Released: 1963; Label: CRC Charter; Formats: LP	—	—
Here's Lena Now!	Released: 1963; Label: 20th Century Fox; Formats: LP	—	—
Feelin' Good	Released: 1965; Label: United Artists; Formats: LP	—	—
Soul	Released: 1966; Label: United Artists; Formats: LP	—	—
Lena in Hollywood	Released: 1966; Label: United Artists; Formats: LP	—	—
Merry from Lena	Released: 1966; Label: United Artists; Formats: LP	—	—
Lena & Gabor (with Gábor Szabó)	Released: 1970; Label: Skye; Formats: LP	162	—
Harry & Lena (with Harry Belafonte)	Released: 1970; Label: RCA Victor; Formats: LP	—	—
Nature's Baby	Released: 1971; Label: Buddah; Formats: LP	—	—
Lena & Michel (with Michel Legrand)	Released: 1975; Label: RCA; Formats: LP	—	—
Lena: A New Album	Released: 1976; Label: RCA; Formats: LP, cassette	—	—
The Men in My Life	Released: 1988; Label: Three Cherries; Formats: LP, CD, cassette	—	5
We'll Be Together Again	Released: 1994; Label: Blue Note; Formats: CD, cassette	—	1
Being Myself	Released: 1998; Label: Blue Note; Formats: CD, cassette	—	—
Seasons of a Life	Released: 2006; Label: Blue Note; Formats: CD	—	—
"—" denotes a recording that did not chart or was not released in that territory.

=== Live albums ===
List of live albums, with selected chart positions, and other relevant details
Title	Album details	Peak chart positions
Title	Album details	US
Lena Horne at the Waldorf Astoria	Released: 1957; Label: RCA Victor; Formats: LP	24
Lena Horne at the Sands	Released: 1961; Label: RCA Victor; Formats: LP	—
Lena Horne: The Lady and Her Music	Released: 1981; Label: Qwest; Formats: LP, cassette	112
An Evening with Lena Horne	Released: 1995; Label: Blue Note; Formats: CD, cassette	—
"—" denotes a recording that did not chart or was not released in that territory.

=== Soundtrack albums ===
List of soundtrack albums, showing all relevant details
Title	Album details
Jamaica (with Ricardo Montalban and cast)	Released: 1957; Label: RCA Victor; Formats: LP

=== Compilation albums ===
List of compilation albums, showing all relevant details
Title	Album details
Little Girl Blue	Released: 1947; Label: Black & White; Formats: Shellac
Lena Horne Sings	Released: 1952; Label: MGM; Formats: LP
Ella, Lena and Billie (with Ella Fitzgerald and Billie Holiday)	Released: 1955; Label: Columbia; Formats: LP
I Concentrate on You: The Best of Lena Horne	Released: 1962; Label: RCA Victor; Formats: LP
My Name Is Lena	Released: 1967; Label: United Artists; Formats: LP
Lena	Released: 1979; Label: RCA; Formats: LP
Damas Del Jazz (with Ella Fitzgerald and Billie Holiday)	Released: 1980; Label: CBS; Formats: LP
Con Plumas	Released: 1982; Label: Liberty; Formats: LP
Lena & the Duke (with Duke Ellington)	Released: 1982; Label: RCA Special Products; Formats: Cassette
Stormy Weather	Released: 1982; Label: RCA; Formats: LP
Stormy Weather: The Legendary Lena (1941-1958)	Released: 1990; Label: Bluebird/RCA; Formats: CD, cassette
At Long Last Lena	Released: 1992; Label: RCA; Formats: CD
Best of Lena Horne	Released: 1993; Label: Curb; Formats: CD
Love Is the Thing	Released: 1994; Label: RCA; Formats: CD
Lena Horne at M-G-M: Ain't It the Truth	Released: 1996; Label: Turner Classic/Rhino; Formats: CD
A&E Biography	Released: 1998; Label: Capitol; Formats: CD
Love Songs	Released: 2000; Label: BMG/RCA; Formats: CD
Greatest Hits	Released: 2000; Label: RCA Victor; Formats: CD
The Classic Lena Horne	Released: 2002; Label: RCA; Formats: CD

== Singles ==
List of singles, with selected chart positions, showing other relevant details
Title	Year	Peak chart positions		Album
Title	Year	US	US R&B	Album
"Stormy Weather"	1942	21	—	non-album singles
"One for My Baby (and One More for the Road)"	1944	21	—	non-album singles
"Out of Nowhere" (with Teddy Wilson and His Orchestra)	1944	—	—	non-album singles
"I Ain't Got Nothin' but the Blues"	1945	—	—	non-album singles
"How Long Has This Been Going On?" (with The Phil Moore Four)	1945	—	—	non-album singles
"Little Girl Blue"	1946	—	—	non-album singles
"Old Fashioned Love"	1946	—	—	non-album singles
"Glad to Be Unhappy"	1946	—	—	non-album singles
"More Than You Know"	1946	—	—	non-album singles
"Squeeze Me (But Don't Tease Me)"	1946	—	—	non-album singles
"Can't Help Lovin' Dat Man"	1947	—	—	non-album singles
"Frankie and Johnny (Part 1)"	1947	—	—	non-album singles
"'Deed I Do"	1948	26	—	non-album singles
"Sometimes I'm Happy"	1948	—	—	non-album singles
"The Man I Love"	1948	—	—	non-album singles
"Take Love Easy" / "I Feel So Smoochie"	1948	—	—	non-album singles
"Where or When?"	1949	—	—	non-album singles
"I've Got the World on a String"	1950	—	—	non-album singles
"Love Me or Leave Me"	1955	19	—	non-album singles
"It's All Right with Me"	1955	—	—	It's Love
"What's Right for You (Is Right for Me)"	1956	—	—	non-album singles
"From This Moment On"	1956	—	—	non-album singles
"That Old Feeling"	1957	—	—	non-album singles
"Push de Button"	1957	—	—	Jamaica
"You'd Better Know It"	1958	—	—	Give the Lady What She Wants
"Where Is Love?"	1962	—	—	non-album single
"Why Was I Born"	1963	—	—	Lena Horne Sings Your Requests
"Now!"	1963	92	18	Here's Lena Now!
"Blowin' in the Wind"	1964	—	—	Here's Lena Now!
"Pleasures and Palaces"	1965	—	—	Feelin' Good
"Softly, as I Leave You"	1965	—	—	Feelin' Good
"Love Bug"	1966	—	—	non-album singles
"Let It Snow! Let It Snow! Let It Snow!"	1966	—	—	Merry from Lena
"Watch What Happens"	1970	— (Note: "Watch What Happens" peaked at number 19 on the Billboard Bubbling Under Hot 100 singles chart, a list which acts as a 25-song extension of the Hot 100.)	—	Lena & Gabor
"Feels So Good"	1971	—	—	Nature's Baby
"Someday My Prince Will Come"	1976	—	—	Lena: A New Album
"Believe in Yourself"	1978	—	—	The Wiz
"Stormy Weather (Part 1)"	1981	—	—	Lena Horne: The Lady and Her Music
"I Wish I'd Met You" (featuring Sammy Davis, Jr.)	1988	—	—	The Men in My Life
"—" denotes a recording that did not chart or was not released in that territory.
