= Seasons of a Life =

Studio album by Lena Horne
- Released: January 24, 2006
- Recorded: 1993–1997
- Genre: Vocal jazz
- Label: Blue Note
- Producer: Rodney Jones

Lena Horne chronology
Being Myself (1998)	Seasons of a Life (2006)

Professional ratings
Review scores
Source	Rating
Allmusic	3/5 stars

Seasons of a Life was the last album by American vocalist Lena Horne.

In early 1999, Lena Horne renewed her recording contract with Blue Note Records following the release of Being Myself. That same year, she recorded a full-length album, entitled Soul, which has yet to be released.

Horne withdrew from the public eye in 2000; Seasons of a Life was released in 2006, and is essentially a compilation album that Horne's musical director and guitarist, Rodney Jones, put together for her. The material consists of outtakes and other rarities recorded during the 1990s, when Horne was actively recording for Blue Note Records. Pianist Herbie Hancock accompanies Horne on "Chelsea Bridge" and "Willow Weep for Me".

== Track listing ==
1. "Black Is" (Marissa Dodge) – 5:20
2. "Maybe" (Billy Strayhorn) – 2:42
3. "I've Got to Have You" (Kris Kristofferson) – 4:15
4. "I'll Always Leave the Door a Little Open" (Richard Rodney) – 3:45
5. "You're the One" (Strayhorn) – 2:54
6. "Something to Live For" (Duke Ellington, Strayhorn) – 4:33
7. "Chelsea Bridge" (Strayhorn) – 4:50
8. "Singin' in the Rain" (Nacio Herb Brown, Arthur Freed) – 4:14
9. "Willow Weep for Me" (Ann Ronell) – 5:05
10. "Stormy Weather" (Harold Arlen, Ted Koehler) – 3:47

== Recording dates ==
Tracks 1, 7 & 9: Recorded for the original version of Being Myself, which was subsequently scrapped.

Tracks 2, 5, & 6: Recorded in 1996 and later used for Simon Rattle's Classic Ellington album. For this release, Jones appears to have used the pre-recorded versions without the large symphony, thus rendering these tracks small-group performances.

Tracks 3 & 4: Recorded September 19, 1994 live at the Supper Club for the album An Evening with Lena Horne; these tracks were subsequently dropped from the release of this live album

Track 8: Recorded in 1997 for the soundtrack to the film Lulu on the Bridge

Track 10: Recorded in September 1993 during the sessions for We'll Be Together Again but dropped before the album's release

== Personnel ==
- Lena Horne – vocals
- Herbie Hancock – piano on “Chelsea Bridge” and “Willow Weep for Me”
- Mike Renzi – piano
- Akira Tana – drums
- Rodney Jones – guitar
- Benjamin Brown – double bass
- Bobby Forrester – organ
- Donald Harrison – saxophone
