= Grammy Award for Best Female Pop Vocal Performance =

Award

- Awarded for: Quality female vocal performances in the pop music genre
- Country: United States
- Presented by: National Academy of Recording Arts and Sciences
- First award: 1959
- Final award: 2011
- Website: grammy.com

The Grammy Award for Best Female Pop Vocal Performance was a Grammy Award recognizing superior vocal performance by a female in the pop category, the first of which was presented in 1959. It was discontinued after the 2011 Grammy season. The award went to the artist. Only singles or tracks were eligible.

The award had quite a convoluted history:

- From 1959 to 1960 there was an award called Best Vocal Performance, Female, which was for work in the pop field
- In 1961 the award was separated into Best Vocal Performance Single Record Or Track and Best Vocal Performance Album, Female
- From 1962 to 1963 the awards from the previous year were combined into Best Solo Vocal Performance, Female
- From 1964 to 1968 the award was called Best Vocal Performance, Female
- In 1969, the awards were combined and streamlined as the award for Best Contemporary-Pop Vocal Performance, Female
- From 1970 to 1971 the award was known as Best Contemporary Vocal Performance, Female
- From 1972 to 1994 the award was known as Best Pop Vocal Performance, Female
- From 1995 to 2011 it was known as Best Female Pop Vocal Performance

The award was discontinued in 2012 in a major overhaul of Grammy categories. From 2012, all solo performances in the pop category (male, female, and instrumental) were shifted to the newly formed Best Pop Solo Performance category.

Years reflect the year in which the Grammy Awards were presented, for works released in the previous year.

== Recipients ==
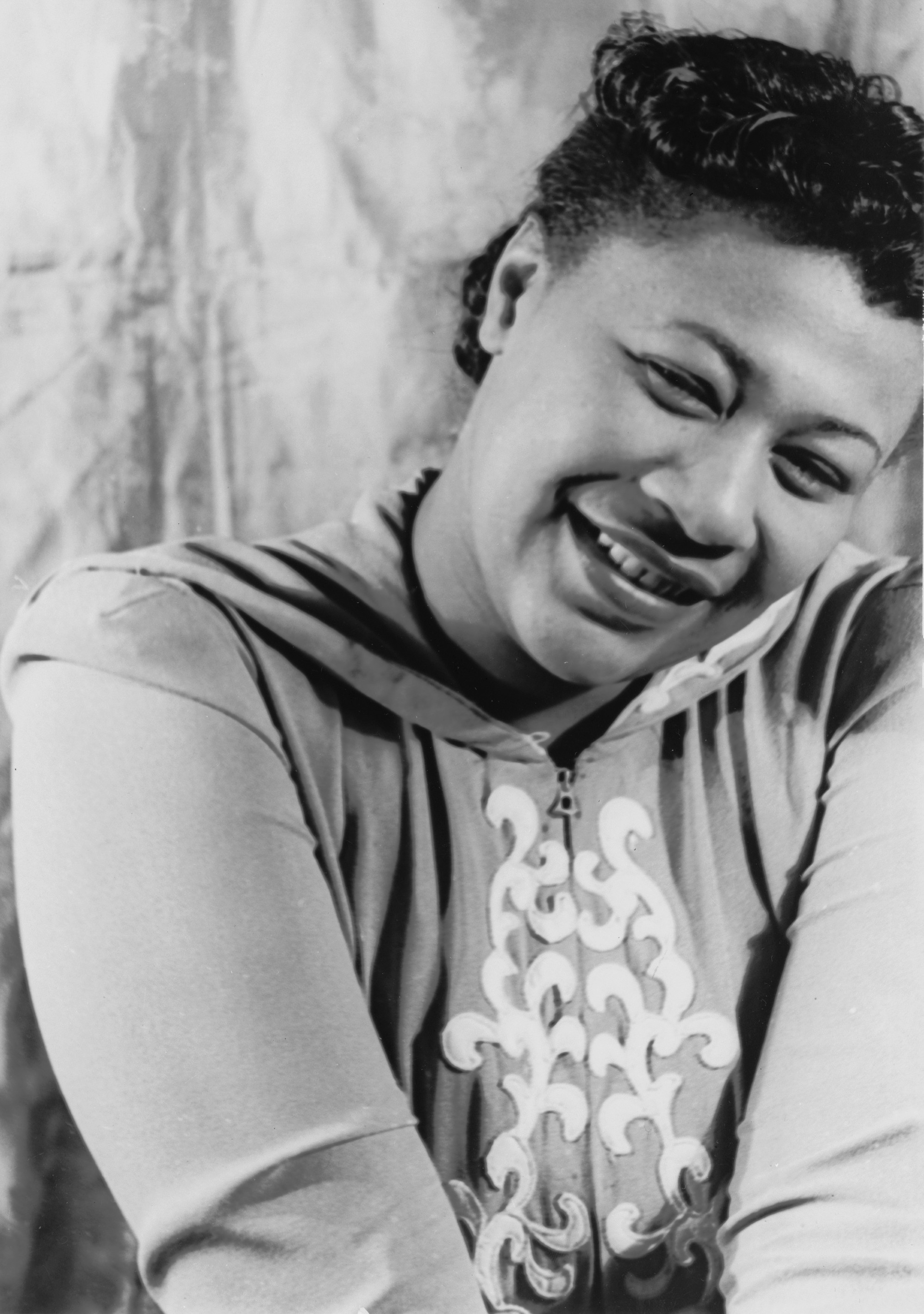
Ella Fitzgerald was the first recipient of the Award, in total she was a five-time award winner and fourth consecutive award winner.

Twelve-time nominee received the most nominations in this category, including five-time award winner Barbra Streisand

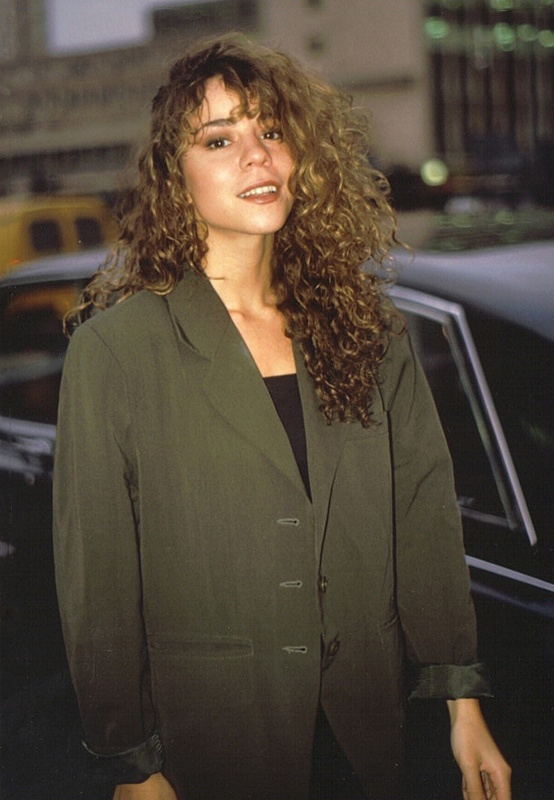
Eight-time nominee, including one-time award winner Mariah Carey

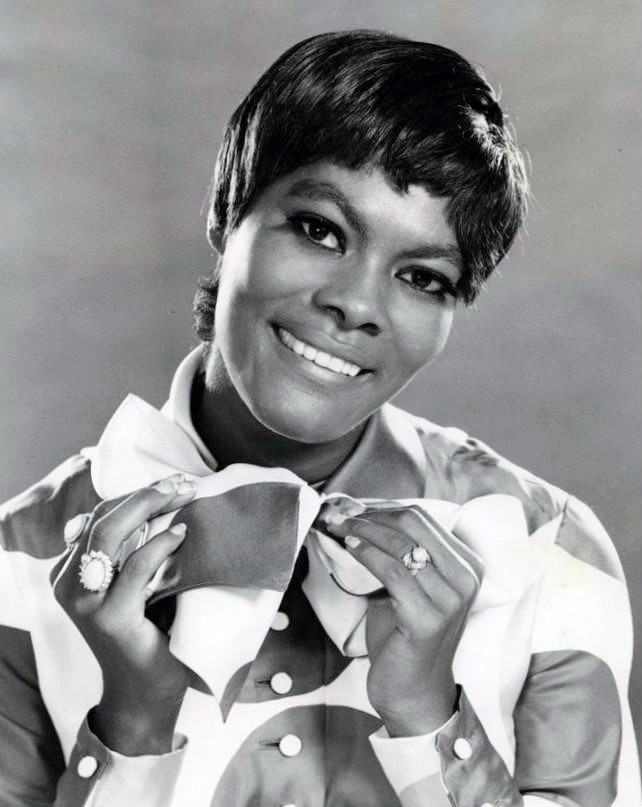
Seven-time nominee, including three-time award winner Dionne Warwick

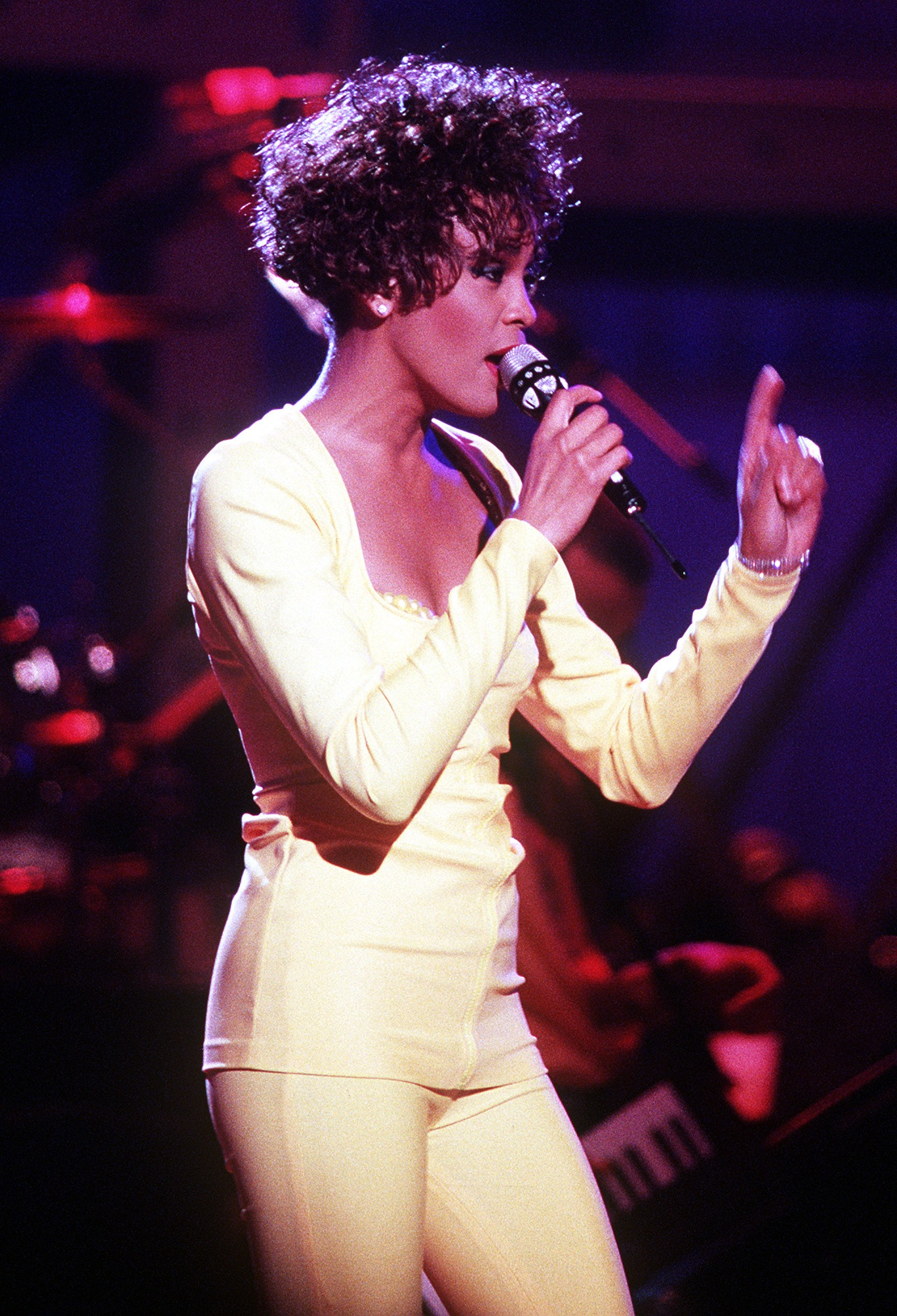
Six-time nominee, including three-time award winner Whitney Houston

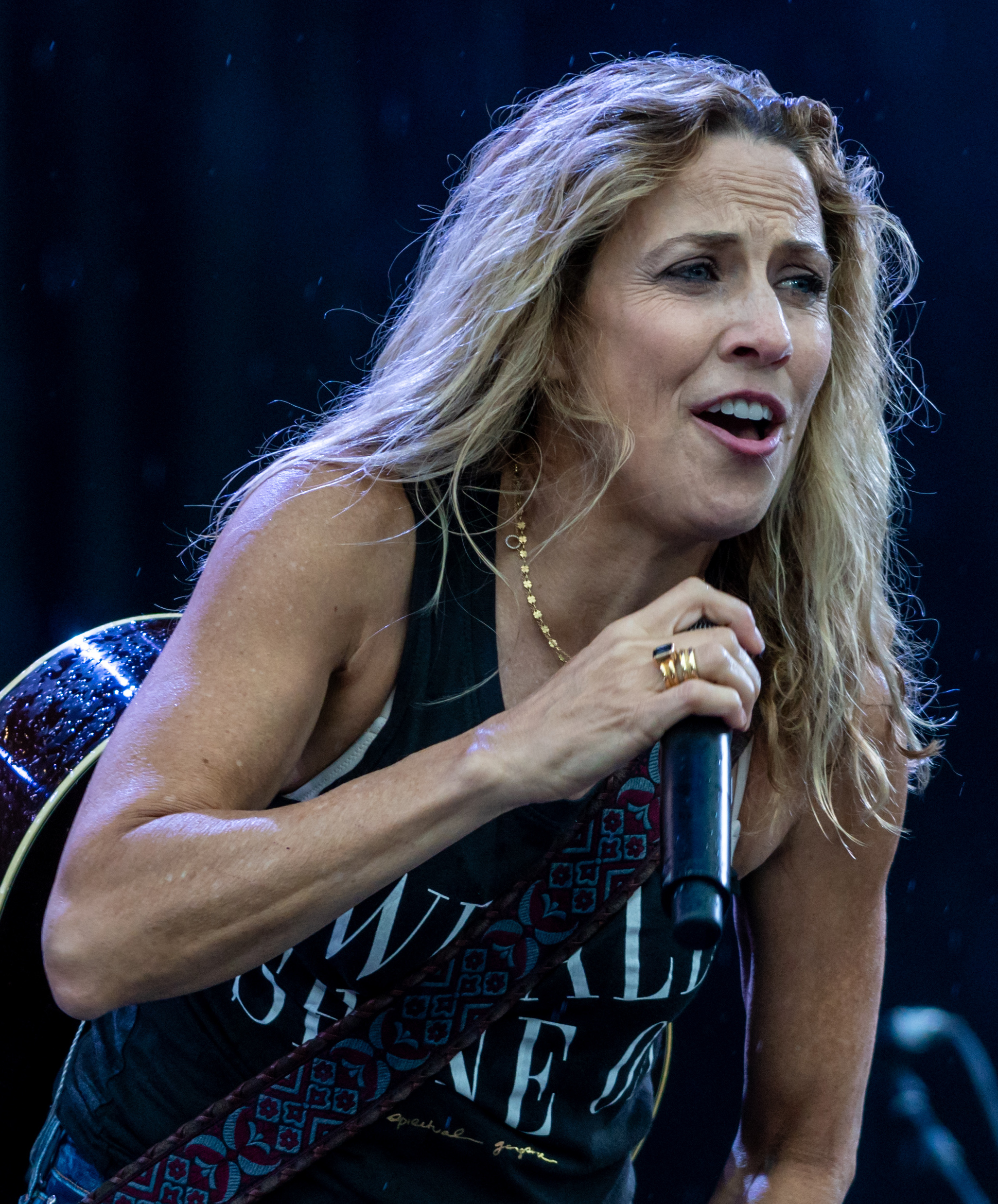
Six-time nominee, including one-time award winner Sheryl Crow

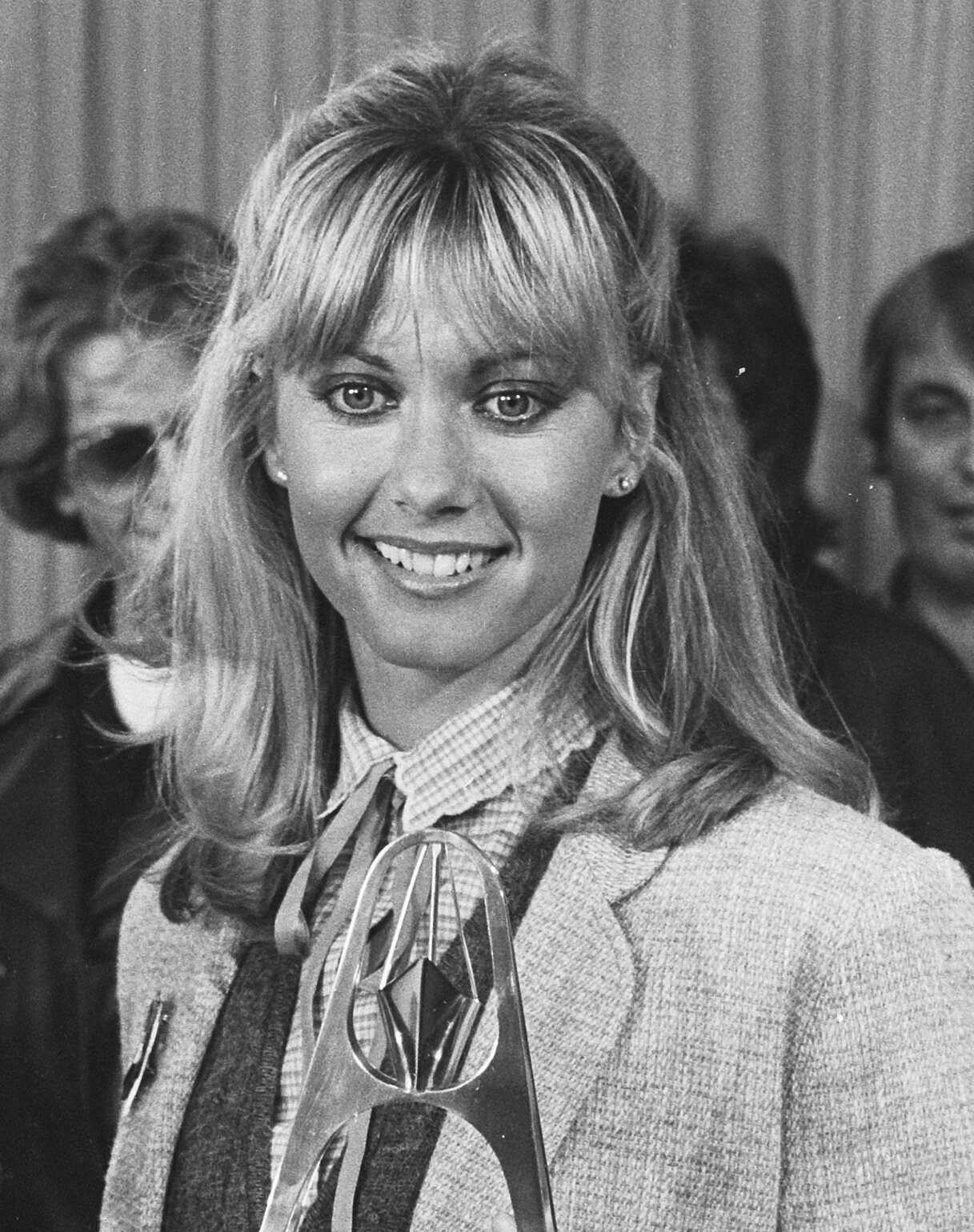
Six-time nominee, including one-time award winner Olivia Newton-John

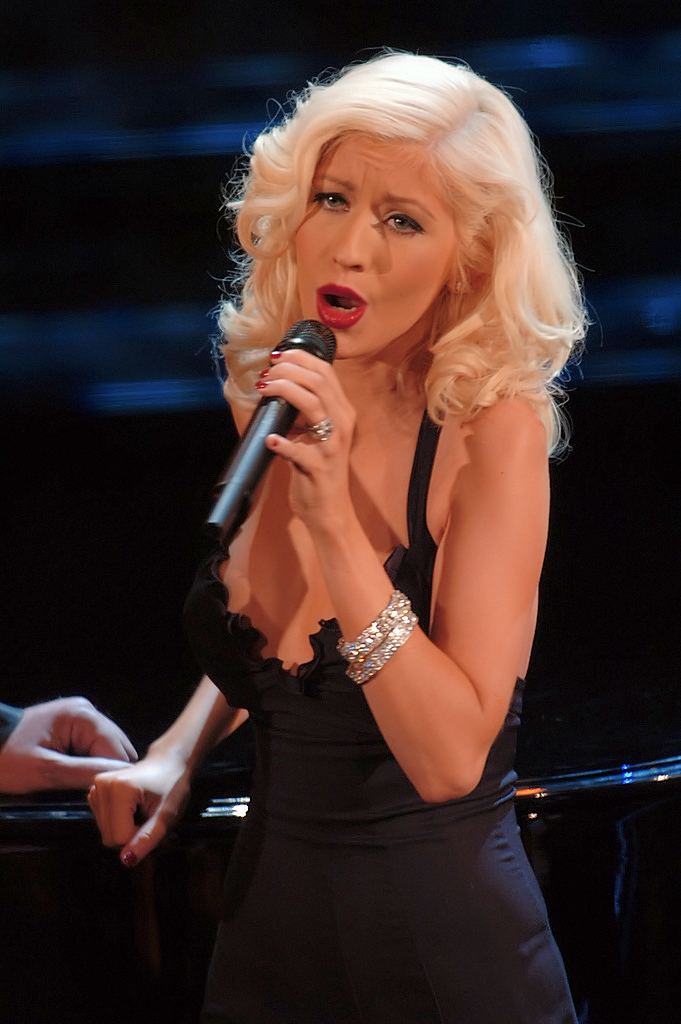
Five-time nominee, including two-time award winner Christina Aguilera

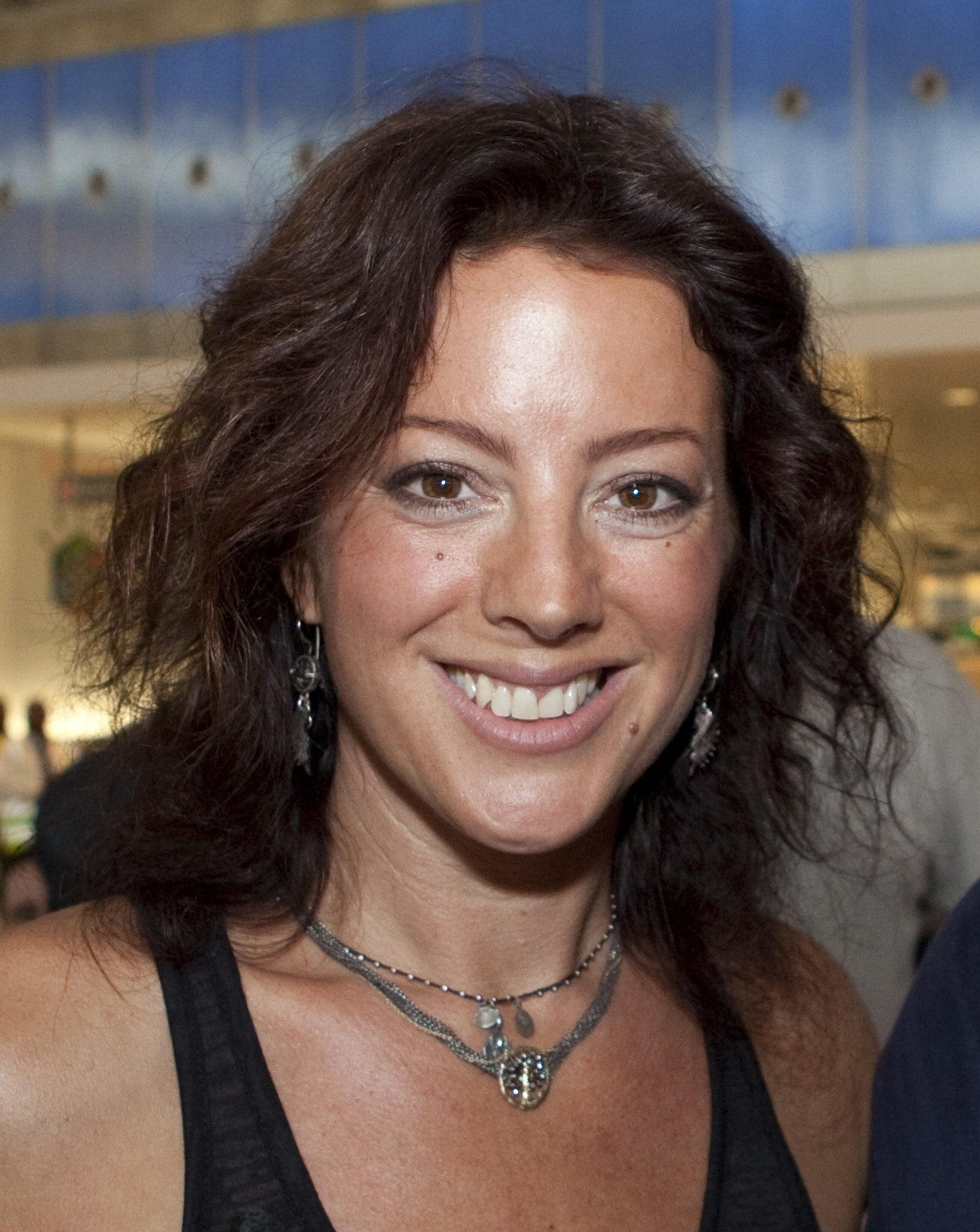
Four-time nominees, including two-time award winner Sarah McLachlan

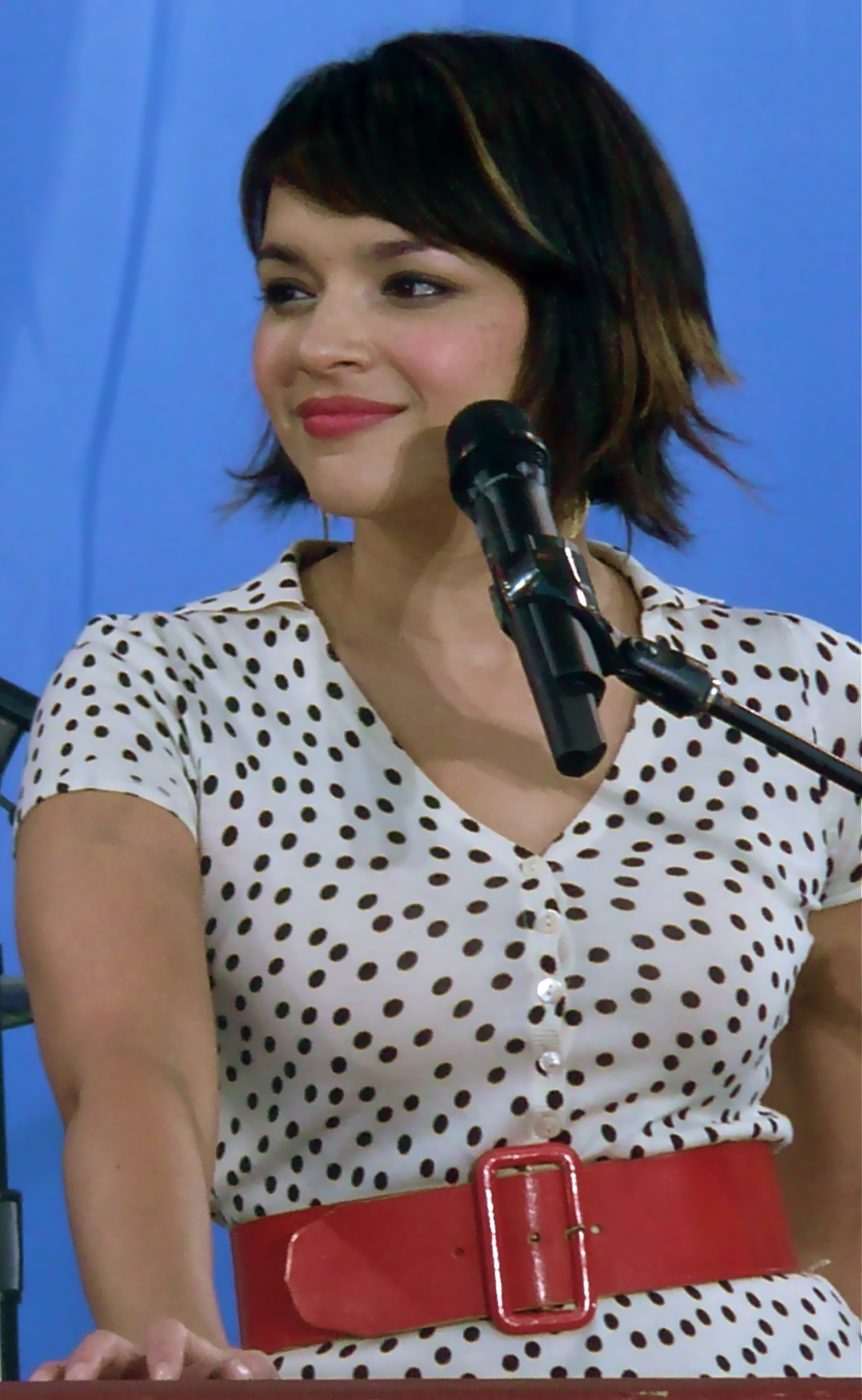
Three-time nominee, including two-time award winner Norah Jones

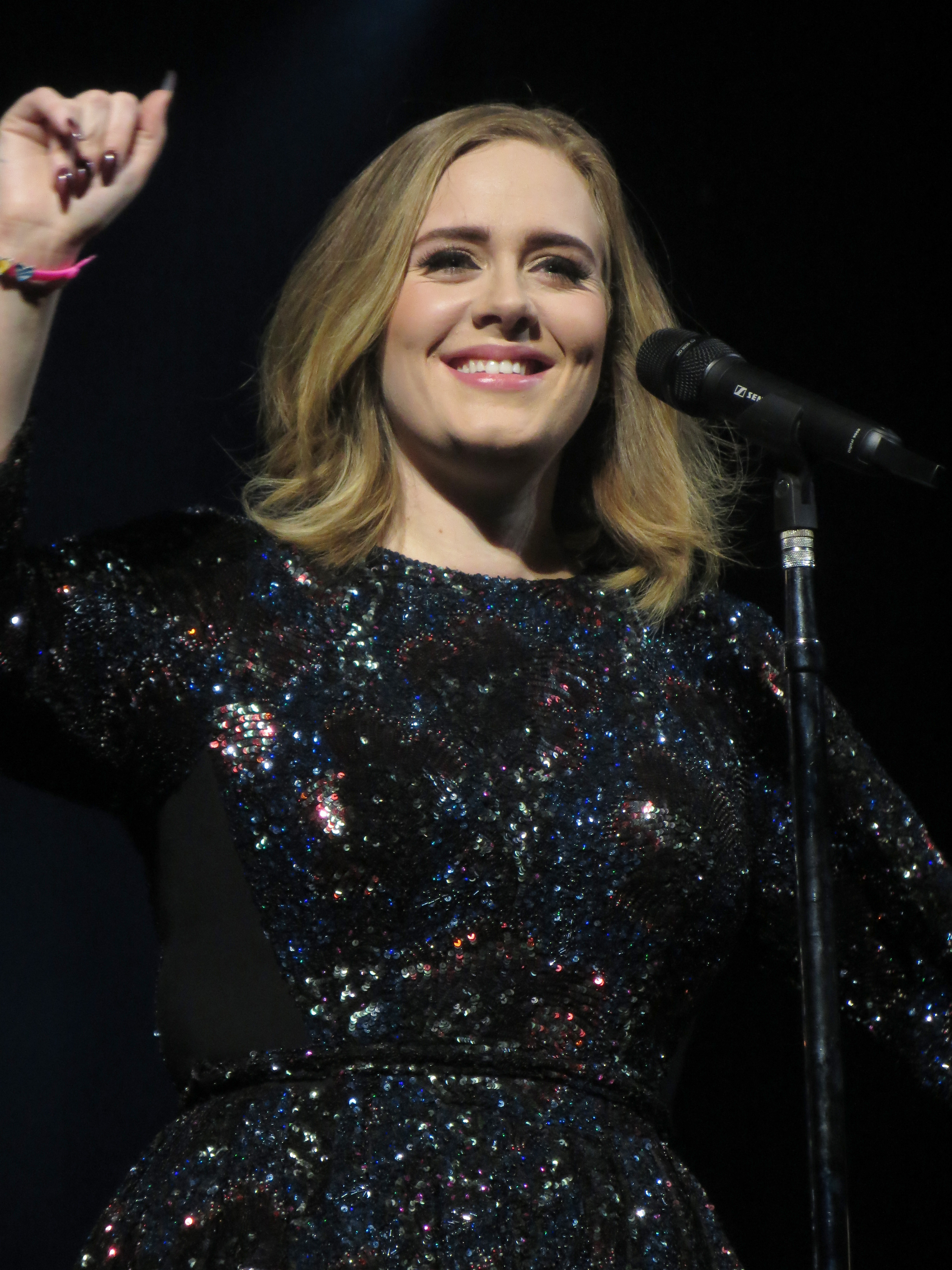
Two-time nominee, including one-time award winner Adele

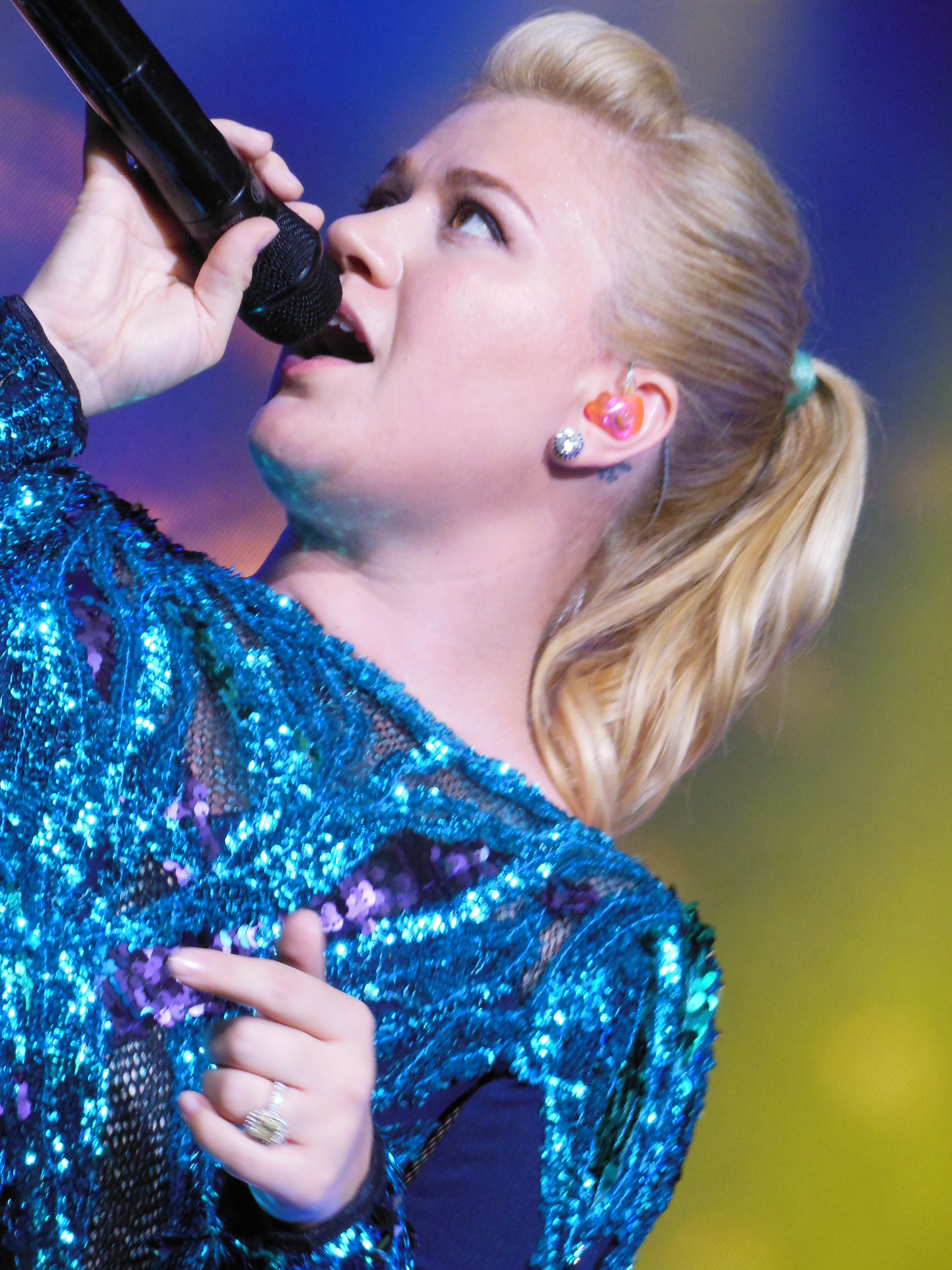
Two-time nominee, including one-time award winner Kelly Clarkson

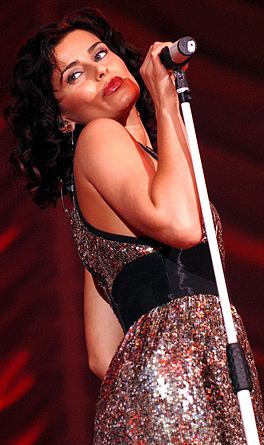
Two-time nominee, including one-time award winner Nelly Furtado. She is the last Canadian winner.

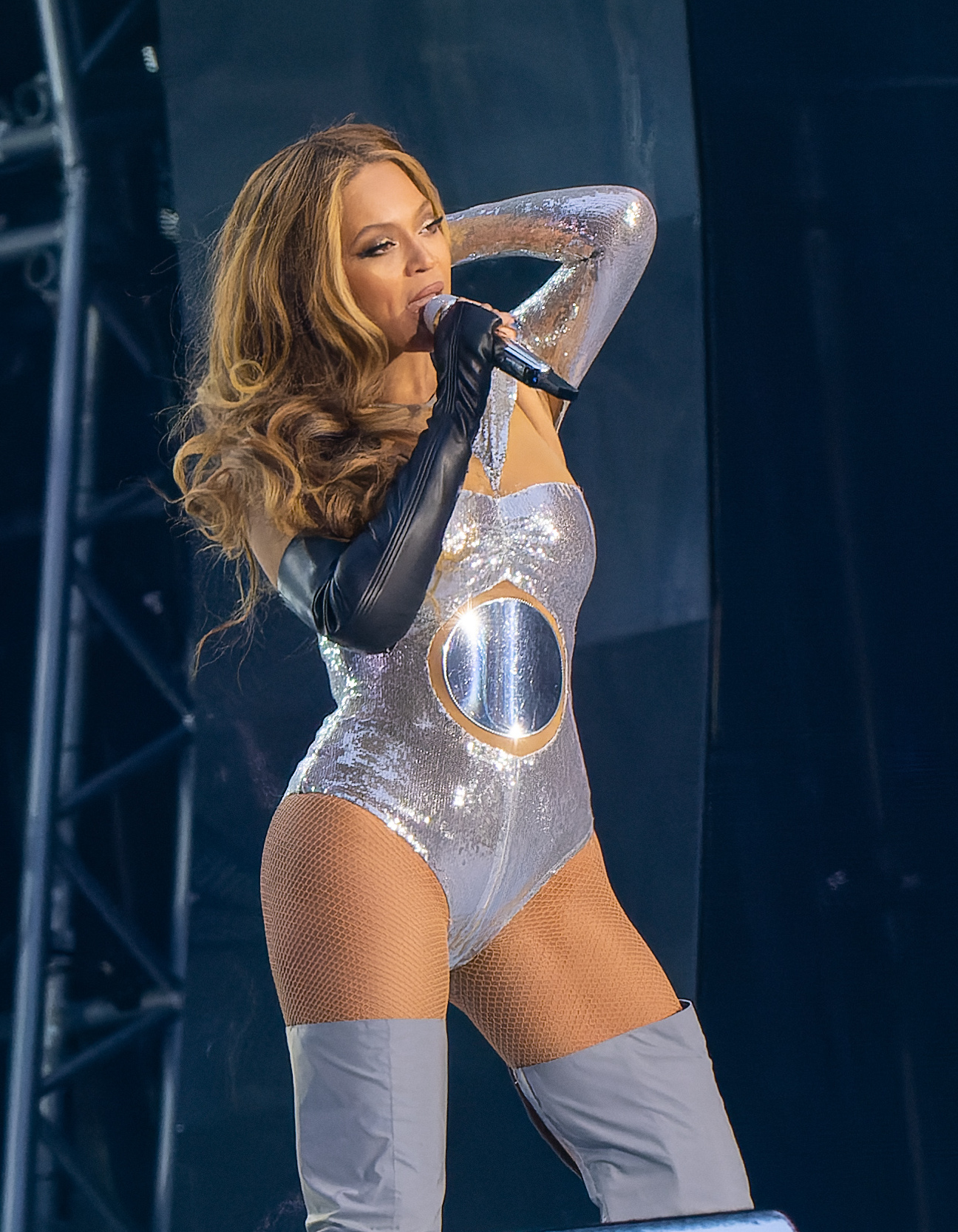
Two-time nominee, including one-time award winner Beyoncé

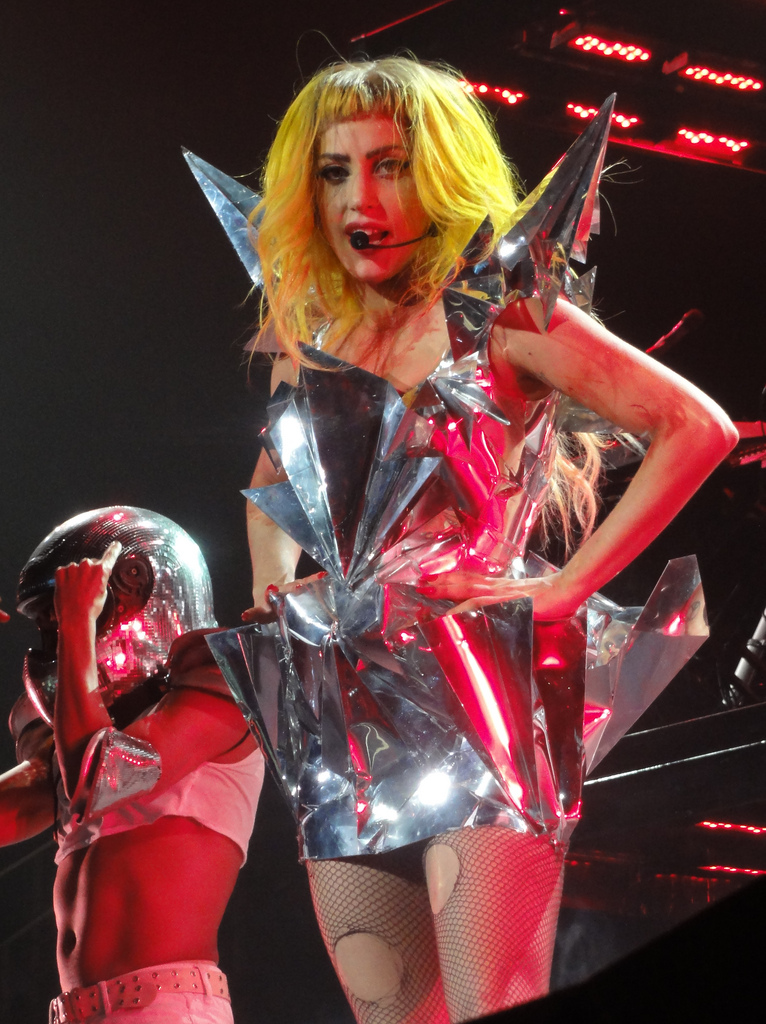
2011 winner for Bad Romance, Lady Gaga. She is the last person to win this category before the debut of the combined Grammy Award for Best Pop Solo Performance in 2012.

=== 1950s ===
| Year | Artist | Work |
|---|---|---|
| 1959 | Ella Fitzgerald | Ella Fitzgerald Sings the Irving Berlin Songbook |
| 1959 | Doris Day | "Everybody Loves a Lover" |
| 1959 | Eydie Gorme | Eydie in Love |
| 1959 | Peggy Lee | "Fever" |
| 1959 | Keely Smith | "I Wish You Love" |

=== 1960s ===
| Year | Artist | Work |
|---|---|---|
| 1960 | Ella Fitzgerald | "But Not for Me" |
| 1960 | Lena Horne | Porgy & Bess |
| 1960 | Peggy Lee | "Alright, Okay, You Win" |
| 1960 | Pat Suzuki | Broadway '59 |
| 1960 | Caterina Valente | "La Strada del Amore" |
| 1961 | Best Vocal Performance Single Record or Track, Female | |
| 1961 | Ella Fitzgerald | "Mack the Knife" |
| 1961 | Doris Day | "The Sound of Music" |
| 1961 | Eileen Farrell | "I Gotta Right to Sing the Blues" |
| 1961 | Brenda Lee | "I'm Sorry" |
| 1961 | Peggy Lee | "I'm Gonna Go Fishin" |
| 1961 | Best Vocal Performance Album, Female | |
| 1961 | Ella Fitzgerald | Mack the Knife - Ella In Berlin |
| 1961 | Rosemary Clooney | Clap Hands! Here Comes Rosie! |
| 1961 | Peggy Lee | Latin ala Lee! |
| 1961 | Miriam Makeba | Miriam Makeba |
| 1961 | Della Reese | Della |
| 1962 | Judy Garland | Judy at Carnegie Hall |
| 1962 | Ella Fitzgerald | "Mr. Paganini" |
| 1962 | Billie Holiday | The Essential Billie Holiday (Carnegie Hall Concert) |
| 1962 | Lena Horne | Lena at the Sands |
| 1962 | Peggy Lee | Basin Street East |
| 1963 | Ella Fitzgerald | Ella Swings Brightly with Nelson Riddle |
| 1963 | Diahann Carroll | No Strings |
| 1963 | Lena Horne | Lena...Lovely and Alive |
| 1963 | Peggy Lee | "I'm a Woman" |
| 1963 | Ketty Lester | Love Letters |
| 1963 | Sandy Stewart | "My Coloring Book" |
| 1963 | Pat Thomas | "Slightly Out of Tune (Desafinado)" |
| 1964 | Barbra Streisand | The Barbra Streisand Album |
| 1964 | Eydie Gorme | "Blame It on the Bossa Nova" |
| 1964 | Peggy Lee | I'm a Woman |
| 1964 | Miriam Makeba | The World of Miriam Makeba |
| 1964 | Soeur Sourire | "Dominique" |
| 1965 | Barbra Streisand | People |
| 1965 | Petula Clark | "Downtown" |
| 1965 | Gale Garnett | "We'll Sing in the Sunshine" |
| 1965 | Astrud Gilberto | "The Girl from Ipanema" |
| 1965 | Nancy Wilson | "How Glad I Am" |
| 1966 | Barbra Streisand | My Name Is Barbra |
| 1966 | Petula Clark | Downtown |
| 1966 | Jackie DeShannon | "What the World Needs Now Is Love" |
| 1966 | Astrud Gilberto | The Astrud Gilberto Album |
| 1966 | Nancy Wilson | Gentle Is My Love |
| 1967 | Eydie Gormé | "If He Walked Into My Life" |
| 1967 | Ella Fitzgerald | Ella at Duke's Place |
| 1967 | Sandy Posey | "Born a Woman" |
| 1967 | Nancy Sinatra | "These Boots Are Made for Walkin'" |
| 1967 | Barbra Streisand | Color Me Barbra |
| 1968 | Bobbie Gentry | "Ode to Billie Joe" |
| 1968 | Vikki Carr | It Must Be Him |
| 1968 | Petula Clark | "Don't Sleep in the Subway" |
| 1968 | Aretha Franklin | "Respect" |
| 1968 | Dionne Warwick | "Alfie" |
| 1969 | Dionne Warwick | "Do You Know the Way to San Jose" |
| 1969 | Aretha Franklin | "I Say a Little Prayer" |
| 1969 | Mary Hopkin | "Those Were the Days" |
| 1969 | Merrilee Rush | "Angel of the Morning" |
| 1969 | Barbra Streisand | Funny Girl |

=== 1970s ===
| Year | Artist | Work |
|---|---|---|
| 1970 | Peggy Lee | "Is That All There Is?" |
| 1970 | Vikki Carr | "With Pen in Hand" |
| 1970 | Jackie DeShannon | "Put a Little Love in Your Heart" |
| 1970 | Brenda Lee | "Johnny One Time" |
| 1970 | Dusty Springfield | "Son of a Preacher Man" |
| 1970 | Dionne Warwick | "This Girl's in Love with You" |
| 1971 | Dionne Warwick | I'll Never Fall in Love Again |
| 1971 | Bobbie Gentry | Fancy |
| 1971 | Anne Murray | "Snowbird" |
| 1971 | Linda Ronstadt | "Long, Long Time" |
| 1971 | Diana Ross | "Ain't No Mountain High Enough" |
| 1972 | Carole King | Tapestry |
| 1972 | Joan Baez | "The Night They Drove Old Dixie Down" |
| 1972 | Cher | "Gypsys, Tramps & Thieves" |
| 1972 | Janis Joplin | "Me and Bobby McGee" |
| 1972 | Carly Simon | "That's the Way I've Always Heard It Should Be" |
| 1973 | Helen Reddy | "I Am Woman" |
| 1973 | Roberta Flack | Quiet Fire |
| 1973 | Aretha Franklin | "Day Dreaming" |
| 1973 | Carly Simon | Anticipation |
| 1973 | Barbra Streisand | "Sweet Inspiration"/"Where You Lead" |
| 1974 | Roberta Flack | "Killing Me Softly with His Song" |
| 1974 | Bette Midler | "Boogie Woogie Bugle Boy" |
| 1974 | Anne Murray | "Danny's Song" |
| 1974 | Diana Ross | "Touch Me in the Morning" |
| 1974 | Carly Simon | "You're So Vain" |
| 1975 | Olivia Newton-John | "I Honestly Love You" |
| 1975 | Roberta Flack | "Feel Like Makin' Love" |
| 1975 | Carole King | "Jazzman" |
| 1975 | Cleo Laine | Cleo Laine Live at Carnegie Hall |
| 1975 | Joni Mitchell | Court and Spark |
| 1976 | Janis Ian | "At Seventeen" |
| 1976 | Judy Collins | "Send in the Clowns" |
| 1976 | Olivia Newton-John | "Have You Never Been Mellow" |
| 1976 | Helen Reddy | "Ain't No Way to Treat a Lady" |
| 1976 | Linda Ronstadt | Heart Like a Wheel |
| 1977 | Linda Ronstadt | Hasten Down the Wind |
| 1977 | Natalie Cole | Natalie |
| 1977 | Emmylou Harris | "Here, There and Everywhere" |
| 1977 | Joni Mitchell | The Hissing of Summer Lawns |
| 1977 | Vicki Sue Robinson | "Turn the Beat Around" |
| 1978 | Barbra Streisand | "Evergreen (Love Theme from A Star Is Born)" |
| 1978 | Debby Boone | "You Light Up My Life" |
| 1978 | Dolly Parton | "Here You Come Again" |
| 1978 | Linda Ronstadt | "Blue Bayou" |
| 1978 | Carly Simon | "Nobody Does It Better" |
| 1979 | Anne Murray | "You Needed Me" |
| 1979 | Olivia Newton-John | "Hopelessly Devoted to You" |
| 1979 | Carly Simon | "You Belong to Me" |
| 1979 | Barbra Streisand | "You Don't Bring Me Flowers" (Solo Version) |
| 1979 | Donna Summer | "MacArthur Park" |

=== 1980s ===
| Year | Artist | Work |
|---|---|---|
| 1980 | Dionne Warwick | "I'll Never Love This Way Again" |
| 1980 | Gloria Gaynor | "I Will Survive" |
| 1980 | Rickie Lee Jones | "Chuck E.'s In Love" |
| 1980 | Melissa Manchester | "Don't Cry Out Loud" |
| 1980 | Donna Summer | Bad Girls |
| 1981 | Bette Midler | "The Rose" |
| 1981 | Irene Cara | "Fame" |
| 1981 | Olivia Newton-John | "Magic" |
| 1981 | Barbra Streisand | "Woman in Love" |
| 1981 | Donna Summer | "On the Radio" |
| 1982 | Lena Horne | Lena Horne: The Lady and Her Music |
| 1982 | Kim Carnes | "Bette Davis Eyes" |
| 1982 | Sheena Easton | "For Your Eyes Only" |
| 1982 | Juice Newton | "Angel of the Morning" |
| 1982 | Olivia Newton-John | "Physical" |
| 1983 | Melissa Manchester | "You Should Hear How She Talks About You" |
| 1983 | Laura Branigan | "Gloria" |
| 1983 | Juice Newton | "Love's Been a Little Bit Hard on Me" |
| 1983 | Olivia Newton-John | "Heart Attack" |
| 1983 | Linda Ronstadt | Get Closer |
| 1984 | Irene Cara | "Flashdance... What a Feeling" |
| 1984 | Sheena Easton | "Telefone (Long Distance Love Affair)" |
| 1984 | Linda Ronstadt | What's New |
| 1984 | Donna Summer | "She Works Hard for the Money" |
| 1984 | Bonnie Tyler | "Total Eclipse of the Heart" |
| 1985 | Tina Turner | "What's Love Got to Do with It" |
| 1985 | Sheila E. | "The Glamorous Life" |
| 1985 | Sheena Easton | "Strut" |
| 1985 | Cyndi Lauper | "Girls Just Want to Have Fun" |
| 1985 | Deniece Williams | "Let's Hear It for the Boy" |
| 1986 | Whitney Houston | "Saving All My Love for You" |
| 1986 | Pat Benatar | "We Belong" |
| 1986 | Madonna | "Crazy for You" |
| 1986 | Linda Ronstadt | Lush Life |
| 1986 | Tina Turner | "We Don't Need Another Hero" |
| 1987 | Barbra Streisand | The Broadway Album |
| 1987 | Cyndi Lauper | "True Colors" |
| 1987 | Madonna | "Papa Don't Preach" |
| 1987 | Tina Turner | "Typical Male" |
| 1987 | Dionne Warwick | Friends |
| 1988 | Whitney Houston | "I Wanna Dance with Somebody (Who Loves Me)" |
| 1988 | Belinda Carlisle | "Heaven Is a Place on Earth" |
| 1988 | Carly Simon | Coming Around Again |
| 1988 | Barbra Streisand | One Voice |
| 1988 | Suzanne Vega | "Luka" |
| 1989 | Tracy Chapman | "Fast Car" |
| 1989 | Taylor Dayne | Tell It to My Heart |
| 1989 | Whitney Houston | "One Moment in Time" |
| 1989 | Joni Mitchell | Chalk Mark in a Rainstorm |
| 1989 | Brenda Russell | Get Here |

=== 1990s ===
| Year | Artist | Work |
|---|---|---|
| 1990 | Bonnie Raitt | "Nick of Time" |
| 1990 | Paula Abdul | "Straight Up" |
| 1990 | Gloria Estefan | "Don't Wanna Lose You" |
| 1990 | Bette Midler | "Wind Beneath My Wings" |
| 1990 | Linda Ronstadt | Cry Like a Rainstorm, Howl Like the Wind |
| 1991 | Mariah Carey | "Vision of Love" |
| 1991 | Whitney Houston | "I'm Your Baby Tonight" |
| 1991 | Bette Midler | "From a Distance" |
| 1991 | Sinéad O'Connor | "Nothing Compares 2 U" |
| 1991 | Lisa Stansfield | "All Around the World" |
| 1992 | Bonnie Raitt | "Something to Talk About" |
| 1992 | Oleta Adams | "Get Here" |
| 1992 | Mariah Carey | "Emotions" |
| 1992 | Amy Grant | "Baby Baby" |
| 1992 | Whitney Houston | "All the Man That I Need" |
| 1993 | k.d. lang | "Constant Craving" |
| 1993 | Mariah Carey | MTV Unplugged EP |
| 1993 | Celine Dion | Celine Dion |
| 1993 | Annie Lennox | Diva |
| 1993 | Vanessa L. Williams | "Save the Best for Last" |
| 1994 | Whitney Houston | "I Will Always Love You" |
| 1994 | Mariah Carey | "Dreamlover" |
| 1994 | Shawn Colvin | "I Don't Know Why" |
| 1994 | k.d. lang | "Miss Chatelaine" |
| 1994 | Tina Turner | "I Don't Wanna Fight" |
| 1995 | Sheryl Crow | "All I Wanna Do" |
| 1995 | Mariah Carey | "Hero" |
| 1995 | Celine Dion | "The Power of Love" |
| 1995 | Bonnie Raitt | "Longing in Their Hearts" |
| 1995 | Barbra Streisand | "Ordinary Miracles" |
| 1996 | Annie Lennox | "No More I Love You's" |
| 1996 | Mariah Carey | "Fantasy" |
| 1996 | Dionne Farris | "I Know" |
| 1996 | Joan Osborne | "One of Us" |
| 1996 | Bonnie Raitt | "You Got It" |
| 1996 | Vanessa L. Williams | "Colors of the Wind" |
| 1997 | Toni Braxton | "Un-Break My Heart" |
| 1997 | Shawn Colvin | "Get Out of This House" |
| 1997 | Celine Dion | "Because You Loved Me" |
| 1997 | Gloria Estefan | "Reach" |
| 1997 | Jewel | "Who Will Save Your Soul" |
| 1998 | Sarah McLachlan | "Building a Mystery" |
| 1998 | Mariah Carey | "Butterfly" |
| 1998 | Paula Cole | "Where Have All the Cowboys Gone?" |
| 1998 | Shawn Colvin | "Sunny Came Home" |
| 1998 | Jewel | "Foolish Games" |
| 1999 | Celine Dion | "My Heart Will Go On" |
| 1999 | Sheryl Crow | "My Favorite Mistake" |
| 1999 | Lauryn Hill | "Can't Take My Eyes Off You" |
| 1999 | Natalie Imbruglia | "Torn" |
| 1999 | Sarah McLachlan | "Adia" |

=== 2000s ===
| Year | Artist | Work |
|---|---|---|
| 2000 | Sarah McLachlan | "I Will Remember You" |
| 2000 | Christina Aguilera | "Genie in a Bottle" |
| 2000 | Madonna | "Beautiful Stranger" |
| 2000 | Alanis Morissette | "Thank U" |
| 2000 | Britney Spears | "...Baby One More Time" |
| 2001 | Macy Gray | "I Try" |
| 2001 | Christina Aguilera | "What a Girl Wants" |
| 2001 | Madonna | "Music" |
| 2001 | Aimee Mann | "Save Me" |
| 2001 | Joni Mitchell | "Both Sides Now" |
| 2001 | Britney Spears | "Oops!... I Did It Again" |
| 2002 | Nelly Furtado | "I'm Like a Bird" |
| 2002 | Faith Hill | "There You'll Be" |
| 2002 | Janet Jackson | "Someone to Call My Lover" |
| 2002 | Sade | "By Your Side" |
| 2002 | Lucinda Williams | "Essence" |
| 2003 | Norah Jones | "Don't Know Why" |
| 2003 | Sheryl Crow | "Soak Up the Sun" |
| 2003 | Avril Lavigne | "Complicated" |
| 2003 | Pink | "Get the Party Started" |
| 2003 | Britney Spears | "Overprotected" |
| 2004 | Christina Aguilera | "Beautiful" |
| 2004 | Kelly Clarkson | "Miss Independent" |
| 2004 | Dido | "White Flag" |
| 2004 | Avril Lavigne | "I'm with You" |
| 2004 | Sarah McLachlan | "Fallen" |
| 2005 | Norah Jones | "Sunrise" |
| 2005 | Björk | "Oceania" |
| 2005 | Sheryl Crow | "The First Cut Is the Deepest" |
| 2005 | Gwen Stefani | "What You Waiting For?" |
| 2005 | Joss Stone | "You Had Me" |
| 2006 | Kelly Clarkson | "Since U Been Gone" |
| 2006 | Mariah Carey | "It's Like That" |
| 2006 | Sheryl Crow | "Good Is Good" |
| 2006 | Bonnie Raitt | "I Will Not Be Broken" |
| 2006 | Gwen Stefani | "Hollaback Girl" |
| 2007 | Christina Aguilera | "Ain't No Other Man" |
| 2007 | Natasha Bedingfield | "Unwritten" |
| 2007 | Sheryl Crow | "You Can Close Your Eyes" |
| 2007 | Pink | "Stupid Girls" |
| 2007 | KT Tunstall | "Black Horse and the Cherry Tree" |
| 2008 | Amy Winehouse | "Rehab" |
| 2008 | Christina Aguilera | "Candyman" |
| 2008 | Feist | "1234" |
| 2008 | Fergie | "Big Girls Don't Cry" |
| 2008 | Nelly Furtado | "Say It Right" |
| 2009 | Adele | "Chasing Pavements" |
| 2009 | Sara Bareilles | "Love Song" |
| 2009 | Duffy | "Mercy" |
| 2009 | Leona Lewis | "Bleeding Love" |
| 2009 | Katy Perry | "I Kissed a Girl" |
| 2009 | Pink | "So What" |

=== 2010s ===
| Year | Artist | Work |
|---|---|---|
| 2010 | Beyoncé | "Halo" |
| 2010 | Adele | "Hometown Glory" |
| 2010 | Katy Perry | "Hot n Cold" |
| 2010 | Pink | "Sober" |
| 2010 | Taylor Swift | "You Belong with Me" |
| 2011 | Lady Gaga | "Bad Romance" |
| 2011 | Sara Bareilles | "King of Anything" |
| 2011 | Beyoncé | "Halo" (Live) |
| 2011 | Norah Jones | "Chasing Pirates" |
| 2011 | Katy Perry | "Teenage Dream" |

== Multiple wins ==
5 wins

- Ella Fitzgerald
- Barbra Streisand

3 wins

- Whitney Houston
- Dionne Warwick

2 wins

- Christina Aguilera
- Norah Jones
- Sarah McLachlan
- Bonnie Raitt

== Multiple nominations ==
12 nominations

- Barbra Streisand

8 nominations

- Mariah Carey
- Peggy Lee
- Linda Ronstadt

7 nominations

- Ella Fitzgerald

6 nominations

- Sheryl Crow
- Whitney Houston
- Olivia Newton-John
- Carly Simon
- Dionne Warwick

5 nominations

- Christina Aguilera
- Bonnie Raitt

4 nominations

- Celine Dion
- Lena Horne
- Madonna
- Sarah McLachlan
- Bette Midler
- Joni Mitchell
- Pink
- Donna Summer
- Tina Turner

3 nominations

- Petula Clark
- Shawn Colvin
- Sheena Easton
- Roberta Flack
- Aretha Franklin
- Eydie Gorme
- Norah Jones
- Anne Murray
- Katy Perry
- Britney Spears

2 nominations

- Adele
- Sara Bareilles
- Beyoncé
- Irene Cara
- Kelly Clarkson
- Doris Day
- Jackie DeShannon
- Gloria Estefan
- Nelly Furtado
- Bobbie Gentry
- Astrud Gilberto
- Jewel
- Carole King
- k.d. lang
- Cyndi Lauper
- Avril Lavigne
- Brenda Lee
- Annie Lennox
- Miriam Makeba
- Melissa Manchester
- Juice Newton
- Helen Reddy
- Diana Ross
- Gwen Stefani
- Vanessa L. Williams
- Nancy Wilson

== Contemporary (R&R) Performance ==
In 1966 the Recording Academy established a similar, but different, category in the Pop Field for Best Contemporary (rock & roll) Performances. The category went through a number of changes before being discontinued after the 1968 awards.

- In 1966 the award was called Best Contemporary (R&R) Vocal Performance – Female
- In 1967 the award from the previous year was combined with the equivalent award for men as the Grammy Award for Best Contemporary (R&R) Solo Vocal Performance - Male or Female
- In 1968 the previous award was once again separated by gender, with the female award called Best Contemporary Female Solo Vocal Performance

== See also ==
- Grammy Award for Best Pop Solo Performance
- Grammy Award for Best Male Pop Vocal Performance
- List of music awards honoring women
