= It's Love (album) =

Studio album by Lena Horne
- Released: 1955
- Recorded: 1955
- Genre: Traditional pop
- Label: RCA Victor
- Producer: Lennie Hayton

Lena Horne chronology
It's Love (1955)	Lena Horne at the Waldorf Astoria (1957)

It's Love is a 1955 studio album by Lena Horne, released by RCA Victor in monophonic in 1955, Horne's debut album for the company, and her first complete studio album. Lena Horne's previous album releases, from RCA Victor and Black & White Records, were collections of 78 rpm singles issued as sets of three of four singles, with the introduction of the 33.3rpm album by Columbia in 1948, this format soon became obsolete. Re-issued on CD twice, in mono sound. Firstly in 1999 by RCA Victor, Japan and a UK release in 2004, together with the 1960 album; Songs by Burke and Van Heusen.

== Track listing ==
1. "I'd Do Anything" (Harold Karr, Matt Dubey) – 2.52
2. "You Do Something to Me" (Cole Porter) – 2.05
3. "You're the One" (Billy Strayhorn) – 3.35
4. "Fun to Be Fooled" (Harold Arlen, Ira Gershwin, E.Y. Harburg) – 3.28
5. "Call Me Darling" (Mart Fryberg, Rolf Marbot, Bert Reisfeld, Dorothy Dick) – 3.14
6. "It's All Right with Me" (From the musical Can-Can) (Cole Porter) – 2.43
7. "Frankie and Johnny" (Lennie Hayton, Phil Moore) – 6.23
8. "Let Me Love You" (Bart Howard) – 3.18
9. "Love Is the Thing" (Ned Washington, Victor Young) – 3.19
10. "Then I'll Be Tired of You" (E. Y. Harburg, Arthur Schwartz) – 3.12
11. "It's Love" (From the musical Wonderful Town) (Leonard Bernstein, Adolph Green, Betty Comden) – 2.10

== Personnel ==
- Lennie Hayton – Arranger, Conductor

=== Performance ===
- Lena Horne – vocals
- with Lennie Hayton and His Orchestra
