= Give the Lady What She Wants =

Studio album by Lena Horne
- Released: 1958
- Recorded: 1958
- Genre: Traditional pop
- Length: 31:51
- Label: RCA Victor
- Producer: Fred Reynolds

Lena Horne chronology
Stormy Weather (1957)	Give the Lady What She Wants (1958)	Porgy & Bess (1959)

Professional ratings
Review scores
Source	Rating
Allmusic	3.5/5 stars

Give the Lady What She Wants is a 1958 studio album by Lena Horne, with Lennie Hayton and His Orchestra. The third studio album Lena Horne released by RCA Victor, this album peaked at #20 in the Billboard 200 album charts. The album has been re-issued on CD, by RCA/BMG, Japan in 2004 and in 2010 by Avid Easy Records, together with two other RCA Victor studio albums, Stormy Weather and A Friend of Yours. This 2CD release also includes the live RCA Victor recordings At the Waldorf Astoria and the four tracks previously only available on the RCA Victor EP Lena Horne At the Cocoanut Grove.

== Track listing ==
1. "Diamonds Are a Girl's Best Friend" (Leo Robin, Jule Styne) – 2:15
2. "People Will Say We're in Love" (Oscar Hammerstein II, Richard Rodgers) – 3:23
3. "Just in Time" (Betty Comden, Adolph Green, Styne) – 2:56
4. "Honey in the Honeycomb" (Vernon Duke, John La Touche) – 2:29
5. "You Better Know It" (Duke Ellington) – 2:55
6. "Get Out of Town" (Cole Porter) – 2:24
7. "Baubles, Bangles and Beads" (Robert C. Wright, George Forrest, Alexander Borodin) – 2:44
8. "Bewitched, Bothered and Bewildered" (Lorenz Hart, Richard Rodgers) – 3:14
9. "At Long Last Love (song)" (Porter) – 2:40
10. "Speak Low" (Ogden Nash, Kurt Weill) – 3:29
11. "Love" (Ralph Blane, Hugh Martin) – 3:23
12. "Let's Put Out the Lights (and Go to Sleep)" (Herman Hupfeld) – 2:10

== Personnel ==
=== Performance ===
- Lena Horne – vocals
- Lennie Hayton – arranger
- Ralph Burns – arranger
