= Being Myself =

Studio album by Lena Horne
- Released: June 2, 1998
- Recorded: 1997
- Genre: Vocal jazz
- Length: 38:26
- Label: Blue Note
- Producer: Rodney Jones

Lena Horne chronology
An Evening with Lena Horne (1994)	Being Myself (1998)	Seasons of a Life (2006)

Professional ratings
Review scores
Source	Rating
Allmusic	4/5 stars

Being Myself is a 1998 studio album by Lena Horne, and was the final original studio album released during her lifetime. It came out shortly before she turned 81.

Horne initially began work on the album in 1995; however, the project was left unfinished and Horne entered the studio in 1997 to record the songs presented in this album. Horne recorded three tracks for the original version of this album: "Black Is," "Chelsea Bridge" and "Willow Weep for Me." These tracks were later issued on the Blue Note compilation album Seasons of a Life.

== Track listing ==
1. "Some of My Best Friends Are the Blues" (Jimmy Smith) – 3:43
2. "As Long as I Live" (Harold Arlen, Ted Koehler) – 2:27
3. "Autumn in New York" (Vernon Duke) – 4:25
4. "It's All Right with Me" (Cole Porter) – 3:17
5. "A Sleepin' Bee" (Harold Arlen, Truman Capote) – 3:36
6. "Imagination" (Johnny Burke, Jimmy Van Heusen) – 5:49
7. "How Long Has This Been Going On?" (George Gershwin, Ira Gershwin) – 4:42
8. "After You, Who?" (Porter) – 3:15
9. "Willow Weep for Me" (Ann Ronell) – 3:54
10. "What Am I Here For?" (Duke Ellington, Frankie Laine) – 3:18

== Personnel ==
=== Performance ===
- Lena Horne – vocals
- George Benson – guitar
- Donald Harrison – saxophone
- Milt Jackson – vibraphone
- Mike Renzi – piano
- Rodney Jones – guitar
- Benjamin Brown – double bass
- Akira Tana – drums
- Jeremy Lubbock – string arrangements (3, 6)
