= Lena Horne at the Waldorf Astoria =

Live album by Lena Horne
- Released: February 20, 1957
- Recorded: December 31, 1956
- Venue: Empire Room, Waldorf Astoria Hotel, New York City
- Genre: Traditional pop
- Length: 35:39
- Label: RCA Victor

Lena Horne chronology
It's Love (1955)	Lena Horne at the Waldorf Astoria (1957)	Stormy Weather (1957)

Professional ratings
Review scores
Source	Rating
Allmusic	4/5 stars

Lena Horne at the Waldorf Astoria is a 1957 live album by Lena Horne, conducted by Lennie Hayton, recorded in Stereo at the Waldorf-Astoria Hotel in New York City on the evening of December 31, 1956. One of the first non-classical live albums to be recorded in Stereo, the monaural album peaked at #24 in the Billboard Hot 200 and became the best selling record by a female artist in the history of the RCA Victor label. The album was re-issued on CD in 2002, by Collectables Records, together with Horne's 1961 live album Lena Horne at the Sands.

== Track listing ==
1. "Today I Love Everybody" (Harold Arlen, Dorothy Fields) – 2.55
2. "Let Me Love You" (Bart Howard, Lou Levy) – 3.06
3. "Come Runnin'" (Roc Hillman) – 2.42
4. Cole Porter Medley: "How's Your Romance?"/"After You"/"Love of My Life"/"It's All Right with Me" – 7:21
5. "Mood Indigo"/"I'm Beginning to See the Light" (Duke Ellington, Mitchell Parish, Barney Bigard, Irving Mills)/(Ellington, Don George, Johnny Hodges, Harry James) – 4:30
6. "How You Say It" (Matt Dubey, Harold Karr) – 3:16
7. "Honeysuckle Rose" (Fats Waller, Andy Razaf) – 2:59
8. "Day In, Day Out" (Rube Bloom, Johnny Mercer) – 2:07
9. "New Fangled Tango" (Dubey, Karr) – 3:06
10. "I Love to Love" (Herbert Baker) – 4:20
11. "From This Moment On" (Porter) – 1:57

== Personnel ==
- Lena Horne – vocals
- Nat Brandwynne & His Orchestra – orchestra
- Lennie Hayton – conductor
