= Stormy Weather (Lena Horne album) =

Studio album by Lena Horne
- Released: September 1957
- Studio: Webster Hall
- Genre: Pop
- Label: RCA Victor
- Producer: E.O. Walker

Lena Horne chronology
Lena Horne at the Waldorf Astoria (1957)	Stormy Weather (1957)	Give the Lady What She Wants (1958)

Stormy Weather is a studio album by American singer, actress and activist, Lena Horne. It was released by RCA Victor in September 1957 and was the third studio collection of her career. It originally contained a total of 11 tracks performed in a pop style, including a remake of "Stormy Weather". The album originally received positive reception from publications like Billboard and the Ottawa Citizen. A re-released version in 2002 featured ten additional recordings.

== Background, recording and content ==
Lena Horne began her career in the 1940s as a film actress MGM, an RCA recording artist and nightclub entertainer. After being blacklisted by the American entertainment industry, she was resigned to RCA in 1954 and a US top 20 hit with "Love Me or Leave Me". RCA then began releasing a series of LP's during the decade, notably Lena Horne at the Waldorf Astoria. It would be followed by 1957's Stormy Weather. The project was recorded at Webster Hall in New York City and was originally produced by E.O. Walker. It featured arrangements and orchestra conducted by Horne's second husband, Lennie Hayton. Stormy Weather originally consisted of 11 tracks in total, including a re-recording of Horne's signature tune (the title track). The remaining tunes were sung in pop style such as "Just One of Those Things" and "Any Place I Hang My Hat Is Home".

== Release and critical reception ==
Stormy Weather was released in September 1957 by RCA Victor and was her third album. It was originally offered as a vinyl LP with six tracks on Side A and five tracks on side B. In 2002, it was re-released onto a compact disc (CD) that featured ten additional tracks, including an alternate version of "Stormy Weather". The album received a positive reception. This included Billboard, which described it as a "powerful package" and found Horne to demonstrate a "smartly, sexy delivery" in the material. Canadian newspaper, the Ottawa Citizen, named it one of RCA's "impressive" album collections released in the fall of 1957. AllMusic's Scott Yanow rated it 4.5 out of 5 stars, concluding, "Lena Horne is heard throughout in top form, and this set is easily recommended to her fans."

== Track listing ==
Details taken from the original 1957 liner notes may differ from other sources. Song length was not included in the original liner notes, therefore song lengths are taken from the 2002 compact disc (CD) reissue. In addition, the CD reissue features the original track listing with ten additional tracks added on following the original set.

Side one
No.	Title	Writer(s)	Length
1.	"Tomorrow Mountain"	Duke Ellington; John La Touche	2:56
2.	"Out of This World"	Johnny Mercer, Harold Arlen	3:37
3.	"Summertime"	George Gershwin, Ira Gershwin, DuBose Heyward	2:52
4.	"Mad About the Boy"	Noël Coward	3:03
5.	"Ridin' on the Moon"	Mercer; Arlen	1:56
6.	"Stormy Weather"	Arlen; Ted Koehler

Side two
No.	Title	Writer(s)	Length
1.	"Baby Won't You Please Come Home"	Charles Warfield; Clarence Williams	2:12
2.	"Any Place I Hang My Hat Is Home"	Arlen; Mercer	3:30
3.	"I'll Be Around"	Alec Wilder	2:54
4.	"I Wonder What Became of Me"	Arlen; Mercer	2:57
5.	"Just One of Those Things"	Cole Porter	2:00

2002 CD reissue
No.	Title	Writer(s)	Length
12.	"Stormy Weather"	Arlen; Koehler	3:52
13.	"Come Runnin'"	Roc Hillman	2:53
14.	"From This Moment On"	Porter	1:53
15.	"A Cock-Eyed Optimist"	Richard Rodgers; Oscar Hammerstein II	3:28
16.	"I Have Dreamed"	Rodgers; Hammerstein II	2:14
17.	"The Surrey with the Fringe on Top"	Rodgers; Hammerstein II	3:28
18.	"Wouldn't It Be Loverly"	Frederick Loewe; Alan Jay Lerner	2:51
19.	"What's Right for You (Is Right for Me)"	Hubert Doris; Tommy Goodman; Bernie Gluckman	2:55
20.	"Sweet Thing"	Betty Walberg; Bob Herget	2:29
21.	"That Old Feeling"	Lew Brown; Sammy Fain	2:16

== Personnel ==
All credits are adapted from the 2002 CD reissue of Stormy Weather.

- Lennie Hayton – Arranger, Conductor
- Marty Paich – Conductor Tracks 20 and 21
- Lena Horne – vocals
- Gene DiNovi – piano
- George Duvivier – bass guitar
- Don Arnone, Kenny Burrell, Bill Pitman, Howard Roberts, Al Viola – guitar
- Maurice Wilk, Max Chan, Julius Brand, Gene Orloff, Arnold Eidus – violin
- Maurice Brown – cello
- John Cresi, Gus Johnson, Shelly Manne, Joe Marshall Jr. – drums
- Jimmy Maxwell, Charlie Shavers, Harold "Shorty" Baker, Carl "Doc" Severinsen – trumpet
- Jimmy Cleveland, Robert Byrne, Bart Varsolona – trombone
- Danny Bank, Eddie J. Wasserman, Bernard Kaufman, Abraham Richman, Emanual Gershman – saxophone

== Release history ==
Release history and formats for Stormy Weather
Region	Date	Format	Label	Ref.
Various	September 1957	LP mono	RCA Victor	
Various	1958	LP mono	RCA Records	
Japan	1974–1977	LP mono	RCA Records	
Australia	1982	LP mono	Stanyan Records	
Japan	1989–1997	Compact disc (CD)	RCA Records	
Various	2002	Compact disc (CD)	Bluebird Records; RCA Records	
Various	circa 2020	Music download; streaming	BMG	
