= Bill Pitman =

American guitarist (1920–2022)

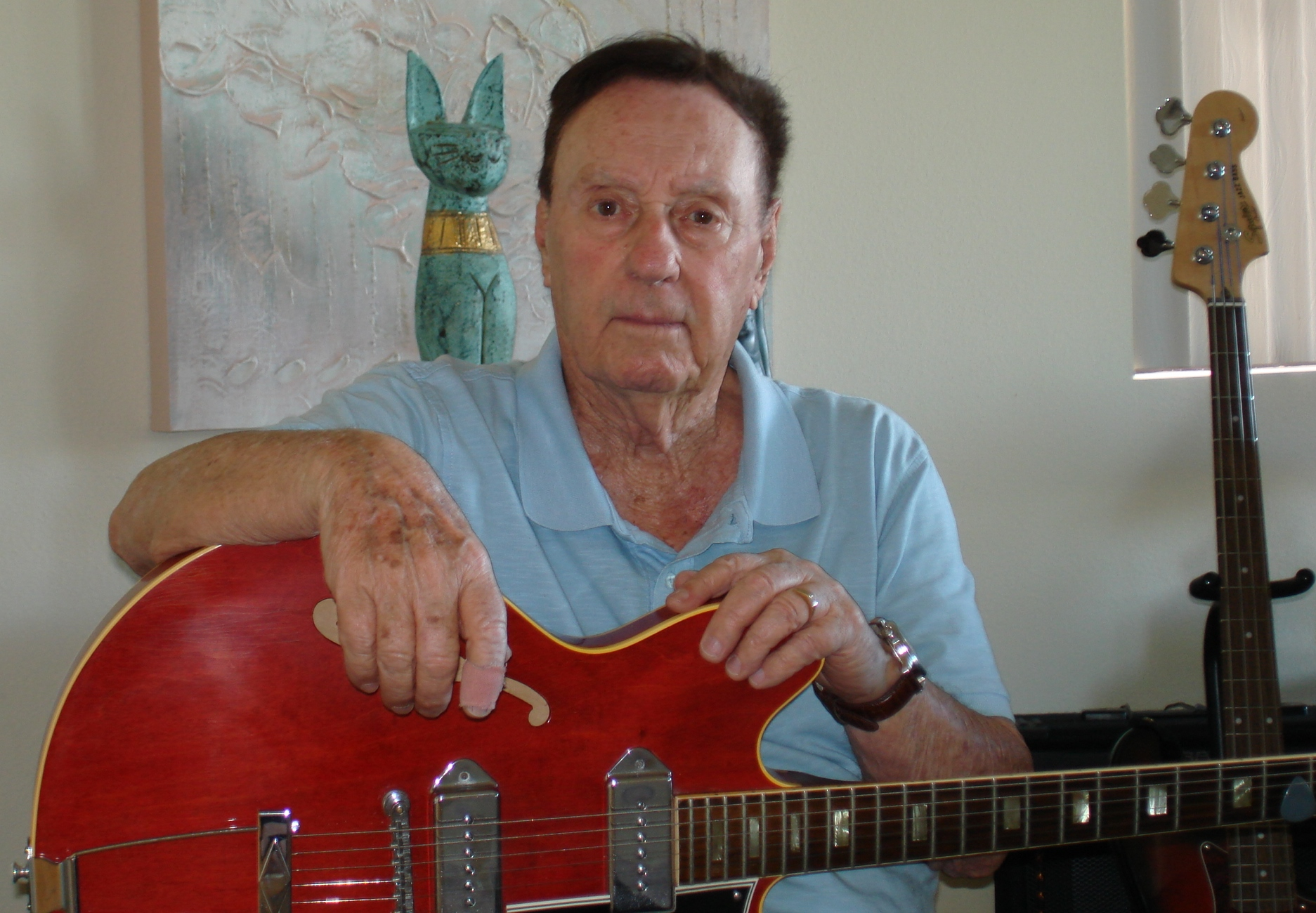
- Pitman with his Gibson ES-330 guitar in 2012

Background information
- Born: William Keith Pitman; February 12, 1920; Belleville, New Jersey, U.S.
- Died: August 11, 2022 (aged 102) La Quinta, California, U.S.
- Genres: Jazz; rock; pop
- Occupation: Session musician
- Instruments: Guitar; bass
- Years active: 1940s–1990

William Keith Pitman (February 12, 1920 – August 11, 2022) was an American guitarist and session musician.

He worked as a first-call studio musician in Los Angeles, playing on numerous records of the rock and roll era. Pitman was part of The Wrecking Crew group of session musicians and backed artists such as Bobby Darin, Frank Sinatra and Pat Boone. He played ukulele on the Academy Award-winning song "Raindrops Keep Fallin' on My Head", and Danelectro guitar on the theme song for The Wild Wild West.

== Biography ==
=== Early life ===
Pitman was born in Belleville, New Jersey and grew up in Manhattan. He developed an interest in music at a young age when his father worked as a bass player on staff at NBC in Rockefeller Center. During the Great Depression, Pitman's father had steady income doing freelance work, radio shows, and movie soundtracks while he was still employed at the network.

When he was five years old, Pitman knew he wanted to be a musician. He tried several different instruments, including the piano and trumpet, before finally settling on the guitar. He received lessons from John Cali and Allan Reuss, teaching him fundamentals and techniques on the first guitar he ever owned, a D'Angelico. When Pitman applied for his Local 802 union card, he easily passed the test before they recognized his surname, saying "Oh, Keith Pitman's son. Well okay."

While in high school, Pitman would travel to 52nd Street to listen to jazz artists such as Charlie Parker. Pitman was strongly influenced by guitarists Charlie Christian and Eddie Lang, and soon befriended Shorty Rogers, Shelly Manne, and Eddie Bert, with whom he frequently played.

=== Career ===
By 1951, Pitman had grown confident that he could play as well as many of the guitarists in the jazz clubs of Los Angeles. While visiting a nightclub where Peggy Lee was performing, Pitman struck up a conversation with guitar virtuoso Laurindo Almeida, who was playing in her band. Their talk led to an audition, landing Pitman a job with Lee that launched his professional music career.

After three years with Lee's band, Pitman accepted an offer to play on a radio program called The Rusty Draper Show. His three-year stint on that broadcast led to studio work when guitar player Tony Rizzi asked Pitman to sit in for him on a Capitol Records date. As word got around, musicians like Howard Roberts, Al Hendrickson, and Bob Bain would ask Pitman to play on sessions they were unable to attend. Eventually, the referrals led to producers calling Pitman directly to fill a guitar chair, resulting in lucrative studio work that would last for decades.

During the latter part of the 1950s, Pitman sat in on sessions for established recording artists like Mel Tormé, Buddy Rich, and Red Callender. However, rock and roll was gaining popularity, and a chance encounter with Phil Spector placed Pitman among the earliest members of an elite group of session players.

In 1957, Bertha Spector asked Pitman if he would teach her son how to play jazz guitar. After three months of lessons, Phil Spector continued to struggle with the concept of meter, leading both student and teacher to conclude that Phil was probably not cut out to be a musician.

The following year, Spector cut a demo for a song he had written, and then asked Pitman if he would play it for his colleagues on The Rusty Draper Show. The song, called "To Know Him Is to Love Him", generated considerable interest, and was eventually financed. Shortly thereafter, Pitman received a call from one of Spector's representatives asking him to play on a recording session for the song at Gold Star Studios. The record became a huge hit, causing Pitman to be invited to all future Phil Spector recording dates. When Spector produced the enormously popular record "Be My Baby" in 1963, he named the jam session on the flip side "Tedesco and Pitman", after two of his favorite guitar players: Tommy Tedesco and Bill Pitman.

Given the popularity of Spector's records, Pitman and the other musicians who created the Wall of Sound became the first choice of nearly every major record label in Los Angeles. Hal Blaine would later call this group The Wrecking Crew, and their anonymous talents accompanied musical artists from the Beach Boys to Frank Sinatra.

When Columbia Records decided to take a gamble on a new band called The Byrds, they insisted on seasoned musicians being brought in to record the instrumental tracks for the first single, because the band had not yet musically gelled. Consequently, the personnel who joined Roger McGuinn in CBS Columbia Square on January 20, 1965, were session players Larry Knechtel, Blaine, Jerry Cole, Leon Russell, and Pitman. In three hours they recorded two songs, one of which, "Mr. Tambourine Man", became a hit. However, when sessions for the band's debut album began in earnest, Terry Melcher was satisfied that the group was now competent enough to record their own instrumental backing.

=== Junior Salt ===
Pitman worked as a freelance musician, employing an answering service to help him schedule recording dates. Studios covered the cost of cartage, an important perquisite considering the number of instruments and ancillary gear needed to meet the eclectic demands of music producers. The frenetic pace of studio work left very little time for live performances or writing. During one year, Pitman logged 425 recording sessions, many of which resulted in multiple sides.

When union rules were pushed beyond their limits, either Tedesco or Pitman would raise the issue of overtime—to the consternation of producers and the delight of other musicians. Their salty adherence to fair treatment led to Tedesco being called King Salt, and Pitman getting the nickname Junior Salt. As Pitman said in a 2002 interview, "if King Salt wouldn't say something, Junior Salt certainly would."

Despite his contributions to chart-topping records by the Mamas & the Papas, the Everly Brothers, and Jan and Dean, Pitman found the rock music he was asked to play unmemorable; expressing genuine surprise when some of the tunes became wildly successful. Producers jokingly claimed that if Pitman thought a record was terrible, then they probably had a hit on their hands.

The indifference Pitman felt toward rock and roll was more than matched by an enthusiasm for jazz recording sessions led by composers and arrangers such as Marty Paich, Dave Grusin, and Johnny Mandel. Pitman derived a great deal of satisfaction from the technical demands of jazz and its complex array of harmonic changes and improvised solos. His playing on The Guitars Inc. and Marty Paich's Dek-Tette albums eclipsed, on a personal level, anything he ever did on a Top 40 record.

Long hours in Hollywood recording studios were primarily focused on performance, precluding other musical work. Notwithstanding the constraints, Pitman wrote a couple of arrangements for Buddy DeFranco, and a stack of charts for a short-lived octet he put together with Buddy Childers. He also earned composition credits for a few episodes of the original Star Trek series; a pair of jazz tunes ("Sidewinder" and "Pitfall") on the 1956 release Marty Paich Quartet featuring Art Pepper; and an improvised tune called "San Fernando" that producers needed to fill out a 1968 album titled Do You Know the Way to San Jose by the Baja Marimba Band. Nevertheless, his enduring legacy is one of an accomplished guitarist who played on some of the twentieth century's most popular recordings.

=== Equipment ===
Pitman's main studio guitar was the Gibson ES-335 with a Polytone amplifier. On some of the rock and roll records, he used a Fender Telecaster with a Fender Twin Reverb amplifier. Other instruments included a twelve-string guitar, Fender bass, Gibson mandolin, and a Bacon tenor banjo. Pitman tuned the mandolin and banjo like a guitar, and was careful to warn producers that he could only play those two instruments in the guitar range.

I'm not a mandolin player. I'd tell them I could double on it, but if they really wanted someone to play the mandolin, they should get a mandolin player. I could play rhythm on it, and even notes, but I always made it clear that I was a guitar player. But we all had five or six instruments because they didn't want to spend the money. And they'd get a lot out of one guy.

— Bill Pitman, Interview with Jim Carlton

The Danelectro guitar work for which Pitman became famous started when he saw the instrument at a music shop shortly after its introduction. His practicing caught the attention of Ernie Freeman who asked him to play the Dano on a recording date. The success of that session eventually led to his playing the Danelectro on Jack Nitzche's "The Lonely Surfer" and the Beach Boys album Pet Sounds. It provided him with five years of recording work on the television program The Wild Wild West. Following his discovery of the Danelectro, Pitman estimates that he played the instrument roughly forty per cent of the time for the rest of his studio career.

=== Personal life and death ===
Pitman was married to Mildred Hurty from 1947 until their divorce in the 1960s; they had three children. He and his second wife, Debbie Ujakovich, married and divorced twice in the 1970s. He married Janet Valentine in 1985 and adopted her daughter from a prior relationship.

Pitman lived in La Quinta, California. He spent his retirement playing golf at the local country club, and occasionally participated in panel discussions of The Wrecking Crew documentary film. He died under hospice care at his home on August 11, 2022, aged 102, from complications of a fall.

== Discography ==
=== As sideman ===
- The Andrews Sisters, Fresh and Fancy Free (Capitol, 1957)
- The Beach Boys, The Beach Boys Today! (Capitol, 1965)
- The Beach Boys, Summer Days (And Summer Nights!!) (Capitol, 1965)
- The Beach Boys, Pet Sounds (Capitol, 1966)
- The Beach Boys, 20/20 (Capitol, 1969)
- Louis Bellson, Around the World in Percussion (Roulette, 1961)
- Jesse Belvin, Mr. Easy (RCA, 1960)
- Hal Blaine, Deuces, "T's," Roadsters & Drums (RCA Victor, 1963)
- Pat Boone, Great! Great! Great! (Dot, 1961)
- James Brown, Soul on Top (King, 1970)
- Red Callender, The Lowest (MetroJazz, 1958)
- Tutti Camarata, Camarata Featuring Tutti's Trombones (Coliseum, 1966)
- George Cates, George Cates' Polynesian Percussion (Dot, 1961)
- Ray Charles, Dedicated to You (ABC, 1961)
- Sam Cooke, Mr. Soul (RCA Victor, 1963)
- The Crystals, Twist Uptown (Philles, 1962)
- Bobby Darin, Venice Blue (Capitol, 1965)
- Bobby Darin, Bobby Darin Sings The Shadow of Your Smile (Atlantic, 1966)
- Matt Dennis, Dennis, Anyone? (RCA Victor, 1955)
- The Everly Brothers, In Our Image (Warner Bros., 1966)
- Percy Faith, Corazon (CBS, 1973)
- The Four Freshmen, The Four Freshmen and Five Guitars (Capitol, 1959)
- High Inergy, So Right (Gordy, 1982)
- Lena Horne, Stormy Weather (RCA Victor, 1957)
- Lena Horne, Lena...Lovely and Alive (RCA Victor, 1963)
- Jan and Dean, Surf City and Other Swingin' Cities (Liberty, 1963)
- Jan and Dean, Drag City (Liberty, 1963)
- Plas Johnson, Mood for the Blues (Capitol, 1961)
- Barney Kessel, Contemporary Latin Rhythms (Reprise, 1963)
- Peggy Lee, Black Coffee (Decca, 1956)
- Peggy Lee, Latin ala Lee! (Capitol, 1960)
- Peggy Lee, Pass Me By (Capitol, 1965)
- Linda Lawson, Introducing Linda Lawson (Chancellor, 1960)
- Shelly Manne, Daktari (Atlantic, 1967)
- The Monkees, The Monkees (Colgems, 1966)
- Big Miller, Sings, Twists, Shouts and Preaches (Columbia, 1962)
- Audrey Morris, The Voice of Audrey Morris (Bethlehem, 1956)
- Jack Nitzsche, The Lonely Surfer (Reprise, 1963)
- Don Randi, Mexican Pearls (Palomar 1965)
- Buddy Rich, This One's for Basie (Norgran, 1956)
- Howard Roberts, Whatever's Fair (Capitol, 1966)
- Howard Roberts, Jaunty-Jolly! (Capitol, 1967)
- Frank Sinatra, September of My Years (Reprise, 1965)
- Frank Sinatra, Strangers in the Night (Reprise, 1966)
- Frank Sinatra, That's Life (Reprise, 1966)
- Frank Sinatra, Cycles (Reprise, 1968)
- Frank Sinatra, My Way (Reprise, 1969)
- Nancy Sinatra, Boots (Reprise, 1966)
- Jeri Southern, Southern Breeze (Roulette, 1958)
- Mel Tormé, Prelude to a Kiss (Verve, 1958)
- Mel Tormé, Back in Town (Verve, 1959)
- Orrin Tucker, The New Sounds of Orrin Tucker His Saxophone and Orchestra (Bel Canto, 1959)
- The Ventures, Play Guitar with The Ventures Vol.2 (Dolton, 1965)
- The Ventures, $1,000,000 Dollar Weekend (Liberty, 1967)
- Kitty White, Sweet Talk (Roulette, 1958)

== Filmography ==
=== Features ===
- Blue Hawaii (1961)
- Torn Curtain (1966)
- Butch Cassidy and the Sundance Kid (1969)
- Goodbye, Columbus (1969)
- Paint Your Wagon (1969)
- M*A*S*H (1970)
- The Omega Man (1971)
- The Parallax View (1974)
- Fast Times at Ridgemont High (1982)
- Dirty Dancing (1987)
- Goodfellas (1990)

=== Television ===
- Bonanza (1959)
- The Deputy (1959)
- The Wild Wild West (1965)
- The Roger Miller Show (1966)
- Ironside (1967)
- Rowan & Martin's Laugh-In (1968)
- Adam-12 (1968)
- The Glen Campbell Goodtime Hour (1969)
- The Sonny & Cher Comedy Hour (1971)

== Bibliography ==
- Pitman, Bill; Almeida, Laurindo; Heitmeyer, Howard; Hendrickson, Al; Kessel, Barney; Bain, Bob; Marshall, Jack; Roberts, Howard (1961). West Coast Guitar: Eight Original Solos for Guitar. New York: Leeds Music Corporation. ASIN B0080YPG16.
- Pitman, Bill (1972). Jazz Guitar Phrases and Solos. Gwyn Publishing Company. ASIN B007RY77W6.
- Pitman, Bill (1972). Modern Preludes for Guitar. Gwyn Publishing Company. OCLC 42232027.
