= Take Me (Frank Sinatra song) =

Single by Frank Sinatra with the Tommy Dorsey Band
- Released: 1942
- Genre: Pop, Jazz
- Length: 2:59
- Label: Victor
- Songwriters: Rube Bloom; Mack David

"Take Me" is a song written by Rube Bloom (music) and Mack David (lyrics). It was recorded by Frank Sinatra with the Tommy Dorsey Band in 1942.

There were three hit versions in 1942, namely the Sinatra/Tommy Dorsey record which reached No. 5 in the Billboard charts, another by Jimmy Dorsey & His Orchestra (vocal by Helen O'Connell) which peaked at No 7 and one by Benny Goodman & His Orchestra (vocal by Dick Haymes) which achieved the No. 10 spot in the charts.

== Other notable recordings ==
- Frank Sinatra - for his album I Remember Tommy (1961)
- Lena Horne - in her album Lena Like Latin (1963)
- Tony Bennett - recorded on September 4, 1952 and released as a single that year. It was arranged by Percy Faith.
