= Hilary Kole =

American jazz musician

- Genres: Vocal jazz
- Occupation: Singer
- Instrument: Vocals
- Years active: 1998–2011; 2014–present
- Labels: Justin Time, Victor, CDBaby
- Website: Official site

Hilary Kole is an American jazz singer.

== Career ==
Kole, daughter of 1950s Broadway performer Robert Kole, was 19 when she fronted a 12-piece band six nights a week singing Great American Songbook standards at New York City's Rainbow Room. During this time she also studied composition at Manhattan School of Music. After the Rainbow Room, she sang at the Blue Note, Birdland, and the Algonquin Hotel. Her debut album, Haunted Heart (2009), was produced by jazz guitarist John Pizzarelli.

Kole participated in a concert at Carnegie Hall in 2007 that honored Oscar Peterson. She sang and co-wrote two Frank Sinatra revues, and she toured covering the songs of Judy Garland. In 2016, she released the album The Judy Garland Project, produced by Richard Barone.

Her album You Are There contains duets with Dave Brubeck, Alan Broadbent, Monty Alexander, Kenny Barron, Freddy Cole, Benny Green, Hank Jones, Steve Kuhn, Michel Legrand, Mike Renzi and Cedar Walton.

== Discography ==
- Haunted Heart (Justin Time, 2009)
- You Are There (Justin Time, 2010)
- Moments Like This (Victor, 2011)
- A Self-Portrait (Victor, 2014)
- The Judy Garland Project (Victor, 2016)
- Sophisticated Lady (CDBaby, 2021)
