= Lena Like Latin =

Studio album by Lena Horne
- Released: 1963
- Recorded: 1963
- Genre: Traditional pop
- Length: 29:31
- Label: Charter Records
- Producer: Dick Peirce

Lena Horne chronology
Lena Horne Sings Your Requests (1963)	Lena Like Latin (1963)	Here's Lena Now! (1964)

Professional ratings
Review scores
Source	Rating
Allmusic	3.5/5 stars
Record Mirror	4/5 stars

Lena Like Latin (a.k.a. Lena Goes Latin) is a 1963 studio album by Lena Horne, arranged by Shorty Rogers and Marty Paich. Recorded in Hollywood in July 1963 and released in the summer of 1963 on the Chater label. The album was reissued on CD in 2008 by Fresh Sound Records, together with the album Lena Horne Sings Your Requests. The CD issue featured a bonus track "He Loves Me" that was previously only issued on 45 rpm single.

== Track listing ==
1. "From This Moment On" (Cole Porter) – 1:52
2. "Take Me" (Mack David, Rube Bloom) – 2:23
3. "Night and Day" (Porter) – 2:41
4. "Old Devil Moon" (Yip Harburg, Burton Lane) – 2:39
5. "More (Theme From Mondo Cane)" (Riz Ortolani, Nino Oliviero, Marcello Ciorciolini, Norman Newell) – 1:43
6. "My Blue Heaven" (George A. Whiting, Walter Donaldson) – 2:25
7. "Cuckoo in the Clock" (Johnny Mercer, Donaldson) – 3:34
8. "Meditation" (Antônio Carlos Jobim, Norman Gimbel, Newton Mendonça) – 2:19
9. "By Myself" (Howard Dietz, Arthur Schwartz) – 2:44
10. "Island in the West Indies" (Ira Gershwin, Vernon Duke) – 2:21
11. "Ours" (Porter) – 2:48
12. "Falling In Love with Love" (Lorenz Hart, Richard Rodgers) – 2:02

== CD bonus track ==
13. "He Loves Me" (Jerry Bock, Sheldon Harnick) – 1:53

== Personnel ==
Performance

- Lena Horne – vocals
- Lennie Hayton – arranger, conductor, orchestration
- Shorty Rogers, Marty Paich – arranger

Production

- Ken Whitmore – photography
- Dick Peirce – producer
