= After You, Who? =

"After You, Who?" is a popular song written by Cole Porter for his 1932 musical Gay Divorce, where it was introduced by Fred Astaire. Astaire played the character Guy, and opened the musical with "After You, Who?"

Astaire reprised the song later in Act 1, before the introduction of "Night and Day".

== Notable recordings ==
- Ella Fitzgerald - Dream Dancing (1978)
- Lena Horne - Lena Horne at the Waldorf Astoria (1957) - as part of a Cole Porter Medley
- Jeri Southern - Jeri Southern Meets Cole Porter (1959)
- Jody Watley - Red Hot + Blue (1990)
