= Lena...Lovely and Alive =

Studio album by Lena Horne
- Released: 1962
- Recorded: 1962; Los Angeles, California
- Genre: Traditional pop
- Length: 35:39
- Label: RCA Victor
- Producer: Dick Peirce

Lena Horne chronology
Lena on the Blue Side (1962)	Lena...Lovely and Alive (1962)	Lena Horne Sings Your Requests (1963)

Lena...Lovely and Alive is a 1962 studio album by Lena Horne, arranged by Marty Paich and featuring trumpeter Jack Sheldon.

At the 5th Grammy Awards, Horne was nominated for the Grammy Award for Best Solo Vocal Performance, Female for her performance on this album. A Grammy was awarded to Robert Jones, Art Director for the Best Album Cover—Non-Classical.

== Track listing ==
1. "I Concentrate on You" (Cole Porter) - 2:42
2. "I Get the Blues When It Rains" (Marcy Klauber, Harry Stoddard) - 3:41
3. "I've Grown Accustomed to His Face" (Frederick Loewe, Alan Jay Lerner) - 3:57
4. "I Got Rhythm" (George Gershwin, Ira Gershwin) - 2:51
5. "I’m Confessin’ (That I Love You)" (Doc Daugherty, Ellis Reynolds, Al J. Neiburg) - 3:25
6. "I Want to Be Happy" (Vincent Youmans, Irving Caesar, Otto Harbach)
7. "I Surrender, Dear" (Harry Barris, Gordon Clifford)
8. "I've Found a New Baby" (Jack Palmer, Spencer Williams)
9. "I Understand" (Mabel Wayne, Kim Gannon) - 3:44
10. "I Let a Song Go Out of My Heart" (Duke Ellington, Irving Mills, Henry Nemo, and John Redmond) - 2:43
11. "I Ain't Got Nobody" (Spencer Williams)
12. "I Only Have Eyes for You" (Harry Warren, Al Dubin)

== Personnel ==
- Lena Horne - vocals
- Gene DiNovi - piano
- Bill Pitman - guitar
- Joe Mondragon - bass guitar
- Frank Capp, Shelly Manne - drums
- Jack Sheldon, Pete Candoli - trumpet
- Bob Enevoldsen, Frank Rosolino - trombone
- Bill Perkins, Joe Maini - saxophone
- Marty Paich - orchestrations
