= Lena Horne Sings Your Requests =

Lena Sings Your Requests

Studio album by Lena Horne
- Released: 1963
- Recorded: 1963
- Genre: Traditional pop
- Length: 33:39
- Label: Charter Records
- Producer: Dick Peirce

Lena Horne chronology
Lena...Lovely and Alive (1962)	Lena Sings Your Requests (1963)	Lena Like Latin (1963)

Professional ratings
Review scores
Source	Rating
New Record Mirror	5/5 stars

Lena Sings Your Requests is a 1963 studio album by Lena Horne, arranged by Bob Florence and Marty Paich. After a seven year successful partnership with RCA Victor, Lena Horne recorded two albums for the lesser known Charter label, both released in 1963. This, the first, was recorded in Hollywood on January 15th and 17th 1963 and released later that Spring. For this album Horne returned to re-record many songs that she had previously recorded in the 1940s and 1950s, several of which she had performed on screen, such as "Honeysuckle Rose" and "Can't Help Lovin' That Man". The album also features the fourth studio recording of the song "Stormy Weather" by Lena Horne. The album was reissued on CD in 2008 by Fresh Sound Records together with the album Lena Like Latin.

== Track listing ==
1. "Love" (Ralph Blane, Hugh Martin) – 2:47
2. "I Wish I Was Back In My Baby's Arms" (K. Goell, Duke Ellington) – 2:29
3. "Why Was I Born?" (Oscar Hammerstein, Jerome Kern) – 2:19
4. "Good For Nothin' Joe" (Ted Koehler, Rube Bloom) – 3:34
5. "Love Me Or Leave Me" (Gus Kahn, Walter Donaldson) – 2:53
6. "I Got It Bad (And That Ain't Good)" (Paul Francis Webster, Duke Ellington) – 3:43
7. "Stormy Weather" (Ted Koehler, Harold Arlen) – 3.17
8. "Poppa Don't Preach To Me" (Frank Loesser) – 2:20
9. "Honeysuckle Rose" (Andy Razaf, T. Waller) – 2:54
10. "The Lady Is A Tramp" (Lorenz Hart, Richard Rodgers) – 2:17
11. "Lover Man" (James Edward Davis, Roger 'Ram' Ramirez, Jimmy Sherman – 3:23
12. "Can't Help Lovin' That Man" (Oscar Hammerstein, Jerome Kern) – 2:43

== Personnel ==
Performance

- Lena Horne – vocals
- Jack Sheldon – trumpet
- Bud Shank – alto sax
- Gene DiNovi – piano
- Shelly Manne – drums
- Marty Paich – arranger (tracks 3–7, 9, 11, 12), conductor, orchestration
- Bob Florence – arranger (tracks 1, 2, 8, 10)

Production

- Dick Peirce – producer
- Jim Malloy – recording engineer
