= Mike Renzi =

American composer (1941–2021)

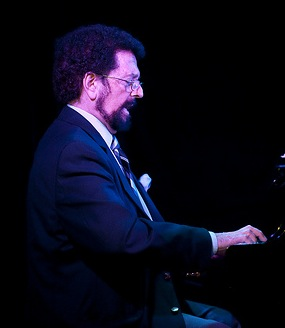
- Renzi, c. 2009

Background information
- Born: April 28, 1941; Providence, Rhode Island, U.S.
- Died: September 29, 2021 (aged 80) Newport, Rhode Island, U.S.
- Genres: Jazz, vocal jazz, traditional pop
- Occupations: Musician, singer, arranger, composer, musical director
- Instruments: Piano, vocals
- Years active: 1962–2021

Michael Ernest Renzi (April 28, 1941 – September 29, 2021) was an American composer, music director, pianist, and jazz musician. Renzi graduated from the Boston Conservatory in 1973 and from Berklee College of Music in 1974. He was a musical director for Peggy Lee and Mel Tormé for over 25 years. He worked on Sesame Street as the music director for seasons 31 through 40 and led the Mike Renzi Trio.

He died in Newport, Rhode Island, on September 28, 2021, at the age of 80.

== Discography ==
With Lena Horne

- Lena Horne: The Lady and Her Music (Qwest, 1981)
- The Men in My Life (Three Cherries, 1988)
- We'll Be Together Again (Blue Note, 1994)
- An Evening with Lena Horne (Blue Note, 1995)
- Being Myself (Blue Note, 1998)

With Maureen McGovern

- Another Woman in Love (CBS, 1987)
- Christmas with Maureen McGovern (CBS, 1990)
- Baby I'm Yours (BMG, 1992)
- The Pleasure of His Company (Sterling, 1998)

With Mel Torme

- Mel Torme and Friends (Finesse, 1981)
- Torme/Encore at Marty's New York (Flair, 1982)
- An Evening with Mel Torme (Concord Jazz, 1996)

With Grady Tate

- Grady Tate Sings TNT (Milestone, 1991)
- Body & Soul (Milestone, 1993)
- Feeling Free (Pow Wow, 1999)

With others

- Laurie Beechman, Time Between the Time (DRG, 1983)
- Tony Bennett & Lady Gaga, Cheek to Cheek (Columbia/Interscope, 2014)
- Ruth Brown, The Songs of My Life (Victor, 1993)
- LaVerne Butler, No Looking Back (Chesky, 1993)
- Cynthia Crane & Mike Renzi, Our First Christmas (Lookoutjazz, 1993)
- Cynthia Crane Smoky Bar Songs for the No Smoking Section (Lookoutjazz, 1994)
- Blossom Dearie, Positively Volume VII (Daffodil, 1983)
- Blossom Dearie & Mike Renzi, Tweedledum & Tweedledee (Two People Who Resemble Each Other, in this Case Musically) (Master Mix, 1991)
- Denise DeCaro, Providence...Live! (bigBang, 1998)
- Denise DeCaro, Christmas and You (bigBang, 2016)
- Trudy Desmond, Make Me Rainbows (Koch, 1995)
- Ann Burton, New York State of Mind (Apollon, 1986)
- Judy Carmichael & Harry Allen, Can You Love Me Once More? (JC/GAC, 2016)
- Meredith D'Ambrosio, Echo of a Kiss (Sunnyside, 1998)
- Jane Harvey, The Other Side of Sondheim (Atlantic, 1988)
- Jane Harvey, The Jazz Side of Sondheim (Little Jazz Bird, 2011)
- Jorn Hoel, Love Will Make You Do Things That You Know Is Wrong (Decca, 1989)
- Dick Johnson, Introduction to the Lyricon (Computone, 1974)
- Jack Jones Paints a Tribute to Tony Bennett (Honest, 1998)
- Jack Jones Love Makes The Changes: The Lyrics of Alan and Marilyn Bergman (2010)
- Peggy King, Peggy King Sings Jerome Kern (Stash, 1985)
- Nicolas King, Nineteen (2010)
- Nicolas King, On Another Note (2017)
- Nicolas King, Act One (Club44 Records, 2021)
- Hilary Kole, You Are There (Justin Time, 2010)
- Hilary Kole, Moments Like This (Victor, 2011)
- Peggy Lee, Peggy Lee Sings the Blues (Musicmasters, 1988)
- Peggy Lee, The Peggy Lee Songbook: There'll Be Another Spring (Musical Heritage Society, 1990)
- Peggy Lee, Moments Like This (Chesky, 1993)
- Gene Lees, Bridges: Gene Lees Sings the Gene Lees Song Book (Kanata/CBC, 1971)
- Jay Leonhart, Salamander Pie (DMP, 1983)
- Jay Leonhart, Life Out On the Road (Nesak, 1990)
- Gloria Lynne, This One's On Me (HighNote, 1998)
- Ray Materick, Sidestreets (Kanata, 1972)
- Liza Minnelli, Gently (Angel, 1996)
- Anne Marie Moss, Don't You Know Me? (Stash, 1981)
- Gerry Mulligan, Soft Lights & Sweet Music (Concord Jazz, 1986)
- Mark Murphy, Satisfaction Guaranteed (Muse, 1980)
- Regis & Joy, Just You Just Me (Big Dot, 2009)
- Samuel Ramey, Sam Ramey On Broadway (Teldec, 1993)
- Annie Ross, Music Is Forever (DRG, 1996)
- Annette Sanders, Everything I Love (Ripe & Ready, 1998)
- Jonathan Schwartz, Anyone Would Love You (Muse, 1986)
- Carol Sloane, The Real Thing (Contemporary, 1990)
- Carol Sloane, Live at Birdland (Club44 Records, 2022)
- Sylvia Syms, She Loves to Hear the Music (A&M, 1978)
- Was (Not Was), Born to Laugh at Tornadoes (Geffen, 1983)
- Thomas Young, High Standards (ESS.A.Y 1992)
