= Lena Horne at the Sands =

Live album by Lena Horne
- Released: 1961
- Recorded: November 3–5, 1960
- Venue: Sands Hotel, Las Vegas Strip
- Genre: Traditional pop
- Length: 52:02
- Label: RCA Victor
- Producer: Dick Peirce

Lena Horne chronology
| Songs by Burke and Van Heusen (1959) | Lena Horne at the Sands (1961) | Lena on the Blue Side (1962) |

Professional ratings
Review scores
| Source | Rating |
|---|---|
| Allmusic | 3/5 stars |

Lena Horne at the Sands is a 1961 live album by Lena Horne, her second live recording released by RCA Victor. Recorded over three evenings, the 3rd to the 5th of November 1960, at the Sands Hotel on the Las Vegas Strip. Re-issued on CD in 2002 on the BMG Collectables label together with Lena Horne at the Waldorf Astoria.

== Track listing ==
1. "Maybe" (Billy Strayhorn) - 2:25
2. "The Man I Love" (George Gershwin, Ira Gershwin) - 4:20
3. "Get Rid of Monday" (Johnny Burke, Jimmy Van Heusen) - 2:56
4. Jule Styne Medley: "A Ride on a Rainbow"/"Never Never Land"/"I Said No"/"Some People" - 7:15
5. "You Don't Have to Know the Language" (Burke, Van Heusen) - 2:12
6. "Out of My Continental Mind" (Shaw, Burt Bacharach) - 2:27
7. Rodgers and Hammerstein Medley: "A Cock-Eyed Optimist"/"I Have Dreamed"/"The Surrey with the Fringe on Top" - 7:04
8. Yip Harburg Medley: "Thrill Me"/"What Is There to Say"/"The Begat" - 6:35
9. "Don't Commit the Crime" (Shaw, Horne) - 5:34

== Personnel ==
=== Performance ===
- Lena Horne - vocals
- Anthony Morelli and His Sands Hotel Orchestra
- Lennie Hayton - arranger, conductor
