= Lena on the Blue Side =

Studio album by Lena Horne
- Released: 1962
- Recorded: 1961
- Genre: Traditional pop
- Label: RCA Victor
- Producer: Marty Gold

Lena Horne chronology
| Lena Horne at the Sands (1961) | Lena on the Blue Side (1962) | Lena...Lovely and Alive (1962) |

Lena on the Blue Side is a 1962 studio album by Lena Horne, released by RCA Victor in stereo and monoaural in February 1962, recording took place in New York in the summer of 1961. The album features mainly blues inspired songs, a departure for Horne from her usual standards, and recordings from the Great American Songbook. The recordings were arranged and conducted by Marty Gold. The album was received well by the music press and Billboard Music Week of February 1962 rated it with a four star. Charting in the Billboard 200 album chart at # 102. The complete album has only been re-issued on CD in Japan in 1991.

== Track listing ==
1. "Paradise" (Gordon Clifford, Nacio Herb Brown) - 3.40
2. "The Rules of the Road" (Carolyn Leigh, Cy Coleman) - 3.36
3. "Darn That Dream" (Jimmy Van Heusen, Eddie DeLange) - 2.41
4. "I Wanna Be Loved" (Johnny Green, Edward Heyman, Billy Rose) - 3.02
5. "I Hadn't Anyone Till You" (Ray Noble) - 2.45
6. "Someone to Watch Over Me" (George Gershwin, Ira Gershwin) - 3.41
7. "It's a Lonesome Old Town" (Harry Tobias, Charles Kisco) - 2.32
8. "I'm Through With Love" (Matty Malneck, Gus Kahn, Fud Livingston) - 2.58
9. "What'll I Do" (Irving Berlin) - 1.57
10. "It Might as Well Be Spring" (Richard Rodgers, Oscar Hammerstein II) - 3.30
11. "They Didn't Believe Me" (Herbert Reynolds, Jerome Kern) - 2.15
12. "As You Desire Me" (Allie Wrubel) - 3.02

== Personnel ==
- Marty Gold - Arranger, Conductor

=== Performance ===
- Lena Horne - vocals
- Andy Ackers - Piano
- Al Caiola - Guitar
- George Duvivier - Bass guitar
- Osie Johnson - Drums
- Bernie Glow, Mel Davis - Trumpet
- Sy Berger, Tony Studd - Trombone
- Strings
