= Porgy and Bess (Harry Belafonte and Lena Horne album) =

Studio album by Harry Belafonte, Lena Horne
- Released: 1959
- Recorded: February and March 1959
- Studio: RCA Victor New York, 24th Street, New York City
- Genre: Jazz vocal
- Length: 35:56
- Label: RCA Victor
- Producer: Bob Bollard, Fred Reynolds

Harry Belafonte chronology
| Belafonte at Carnegie Hall (1959) | Porgy and Bess (1959) | My Lord What a Mornin' (1960) |

Lena Horne chronology
| Give the Lady What She Wants (1958) | Porgy and Bess (1959) | Songs by Burke and Van Heusen (1959) |

Professional ratings
Review scores
| Source | Rating |
|---|---|
| AllMusic | 3/5 stars |

Porgy and Bess is an album by Harry Belafonte and Lena Horne, released by RCA Victor in 1959.

== Background ==
It features songs from George Gershwin's opera Porgy and Bess. Belafonte and Horne sing two songs together: "There's a Boat That's Leavin' Soon for New York" and "Bess, You Is My Woman Now". The album was re-issued on a 2-CD set in 2003 together with Jamaica by RCA/BMG Collectibles in Stereo.

== Chart performance ==
The album was ranked No. 1 on the Canadian CHUM Chart for 10 of the 11 weeks between August 31 and November 9, 1959. In the US on the Billboard Best Silling Monoral LPs the album peaked at No. 13, during a twenty one-week run on the chart.

== Track listing ==
All music is by George Gershwin, lyricists are indicated.

1. "A Woman is a Sometime Thing" (DuBose Heyward) – 2:40
2. "Summertime" (Heyward) – 3:11
3. "Oh I Got Plenty of Nothing" (Ira Gershwin, Heyward) – 3:00
4. "I Wants to Stay Here" (I. Gershwin, Heyward) – 3:30
5. "Bess, You Is My Woman Now" (I. Gershwin, Heyward) – 5:57
6. "It Ain't Necessarily So" (I. Gershwin) – 3:03
7. "Street Calls": "Strawberry Woman" / "The Honey Man" / "Crab Man" (Heyward) – 4:17
8. "My Man's Gone Now" (Heyward) – 4:05
9. "Bess, Oh Where's My Bess" (I. Gershwin) – 3:36
10. "There's a Boat That's Leavin' Soon for New York" (I. Gershwin) – 2:37

== Personnel ==
- Harry Belafonte – vocals
- Lena Horne – vocals

Production notes:

- Bob Bollard – producer
- Fred Reynolds – producer
- Lennie Hayton – arrangements, musical director
- Robert Corman – arrangements, musical director
- Ernest Oelrich – engineer
- Murray Laden – cover photo

== Charts ==
| Chart (1959) | Peak position |
|---|---|
| US Billboard Best Selling Monoraul LP's | 13 |
| CAN CHUM Top LP's | 1 |
