= We'll Be Together Again (Lena Horne album) =

Studio album by Lena Horne
- Released: May 17, 1994
- Recorded: September–October 1993
- Genre: Vocal jazz
- Length: 52:02
- Label: Blue Note
- Producer: Mike Renzi, Shirley Cowell, Sherman Sneed

Lena Horne chronology
The Men in My Life (1988)	We'll Be Together Again (1994)	An Evening with Lena Horne (1994)

Professional ratings
Review scores
Source	Rating
Allmusic	3/5 stars

We'll Be Together Again is a 1994 album by Lena Horne. At the 1995 Grammy Awards, Horne was nominated for a Grammy for Best Jazz Vocal Performance for this album.

== Track listing ==
1. "Maybe" (Billy Strayhorn)
2. "Something to Live For" (Duke Ellington, Billy Strayhorn)
3. "Day Follows Day" duet with Johnny Mathis (George Abbott, Shirley Cowell)
4. "Prelude to a Kiss" (Ellington, Mack Gordon, Irving Mills)
5. "Love Like This Can't Last" (Strayhorn)
6. "We'll Be Together Again" (Carl T. Fischer, Frankie Laine)
7. "A Flower Is a Lovesome Thing" (Strayhorn)
8. "Old Friend" (Stephen Sondheim)
9. "You're the One" (Strayhorn)
10. "Havin' Myself a Time" (Ralph Rainger), (Leo Robin)
11. "My Mood Is You" (Carl Sigman)
12. "I'll Always Leave the Door a Little Open" (Richard Rodney)
13. "Do Nothin' Till You Hear from Me" (Ellington, Bob Russell)
14. "Forever Was a Day" (Mike Renzi, Rodney Jones)
15. "I've Got to Have You" (Kris Kristofferson)
16. "My Buddy" (Walter Donaldson, Gus Kahn)

== Personnel ==
=== Performance ===
- Lena Horne - vocals
- Ben Brown - electric bass, acoustic bass
- Tracy Wormworth - double bass
- Jesse Levy - cello
- Akira Tana - drums
- Buddy Williams
- Rodney Jones - acoustic guitar, electric guitar
- Toots Thielemans - harmonica
- Eli Fountain - percussion
- Frank Owens - piano, arranger, producer
- Mike Renzi
- Jerome Richardson - tenor saxophone
- Houston Person
- Sanford Allen - violin

=== Production ===
- Sherman Sneed - producer
- Ken Howard - photography
- Jack Vartoogian
- David Hajdu - liner notes
- Joe Brescia - mastering
- Dan Kincaid
- Jim Czak - engineer
- Shirley Cowell - executive producer
- Eric Kohler - design
- Robert W. Richards - artwork, illustrations
- Victor Deyglio - assistant engineer
