= An Evening with Lena Horne =

Live album by Lena Horne
- Released: March 21, 1995
- Recorded: September 19, 1994
- Genre: Vocal jazz
- Length: 52:02
- Label: Blue Note
- Producer: Michael Cuscuna, Sherman Sneed

Lena Horne chronology
We'll Be Together Again (1993)	An Evening with Lena Horne (1995)	Being Myself (1998)

Professional ratings
Review scores
Source	Rating
Allmusic	4.5/5 stars

An Evening with Lena Horne is a 1994 live album by Lena Horne.

At the 38th Grammy Awards, Horne's performance on this album won her the Grammy Award for Best Jazz Vocal Performance.

== Track listing ==
1. "I Come Runnin'" (Roc Hillman) – 3:08
2. "Maybe" (Billy Strayhorn) – 2:47
3. "I've Got the World on a String" (Harold Arlen, Ted Koehler) – 4:56
4. "Old Friend" (Stephen Sondheim) – 3:13
5. "Something to Live For" (Duke Ellington, Strayhorn) – 5:12
6. "Mood Indigo" (Barney Bigard, Ellington, Irving Mills) – 1:11
7. "Squeeze Me" (Fats Waller, Clarence Williams) – 1:20
8. "Do Nothin' Till You Hear from Me" (Ellington, Bob Russell) – 4:21
9. "Yesterday, When I Was Young" (Charles Aznavour, Herbert Kretzmer) – 5:45
10. "How's Your Romance?" (Cole Porter) – 1:50
11. "Why Shouldn't I?" (Porter) – 2:56
12. "Ours" (Porter) – 2:50
13. "Just One of Those Things" (Porter) – 3:27
14. "We'll Be Together Again" (Carl Fischer, Frankie Laine) – 1:24
15. "Watch What Happens" (Norman Gimbel, Michel Legrand) – 3:36
16. "The Lady Is a Tramp" (Lorenz Hart, Richard Rodgers) – 3:04

== Personnel ==
=== Performance ===
- Lena Horne – vocals
- Mike Renzi – synthesizer, piano, musical director
- Rodney Jones – guitar
- Ben Brown – double bass
- Akira Tana – drums
- The Count Basie Orchestra:
- Clarence Banks – trombone
- Bill Hughes
- Mel Wanzo – trombone
- Danny Turner – flute, alto saxophone
- Kenny King – flute, tenor saxophone
- John Williams – baritone saxophone
- Doug Miller
- Bob Ojeda – trumpet, flugelhorn
- Michael Williams

=== Production ===
- Michael Cuscuna – producer
- Sherman Sneed
- Larry Walsh – mastering
- John Harris – engineer, remixing
