= Songs by Burke and Van Heusen =

Studio album by Lena Horne
- Released: 1959
- Recorded: December 1 & 9, 1958 and January 5, 1959
- Genre: Traditional pop
- Length: 52:02
- Label: RCA Victor
- Producer: Fred Reynolds

Lena Horne chronology
| Porgy & Bess (1959) | Songs by Burke and Van Heusen (1959) | Lena Horne at the Sands (1961) |

Professional ratings
Review scores
| Source | Rating |
|---|---|
| Allmusic | 3/5 stars |

Songs by Burke and Van Heusen is a 1959 studio album by Lena Horne, of songs written by Johnny Burke and Jimmy Van Heusen. This album was released in some countries with the alternative title A Friend Of Yours. Recorded with Lennie Hayton and His Orchestra at the RCA Victor studio, New York on December 1 and 9, 1958, completed on January 5, 1959. The complete album has been re-issued on CD in Stereo, firstly in 2001 by BMG, Japan and by Avid Easy Records in 2010.

== Track listing ==
1. "You Don't Have to Know the Language" – 2:56
2. "Like Someone in Love" – 2:59
3. "It's Anybody's Spring" – 2:21
4. "But Beautiful" – 4:03
5. "Just My Luck" – 2:35
6. "Get Rid of Monday" – 2:53
7. "A Friend of Yours" – 3:11
8. "It Could Happen to You" – 2:56
9. "Sleigh Ride in July" – 3:24
10. "My Heart Is a Hobo" – 1:56
11. "Polka Dots and Moonbeams" – 3:09
12. "Ring the Bell" – 3:11

All music composed by Jimmy Van Heusen, and all lyrics written by Johnny Burke.

== Personnel ==
=== Performance ===
- Lena Horne – vocals
- Lennie Hayton – arranger
- Ralph Burns – arranger
