= Lennie Hayton =

American pianist, conductor, composer, and arranger (1908–1971)

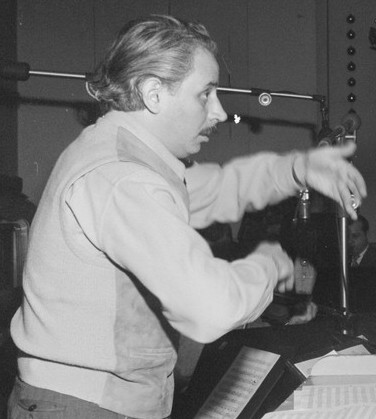
- Lennie Hayton circa 1947
- Born: Leonard George Hayton; February 14, 1908; New York City, U.S.
- Died: April 24, 1971 (aged 63); Palm Springs, California, U.S.
- Resting place: Hollywood Forever Cemetery, Hollywood, California
- Occupations: Musician; arranger; composer; conductor
- Years active: 1928–1970
- Spouses: Helen M. Gifford (m. 1935; died 1943) Lena Horne (m. 1947)

Leonard George Hayton (February 14, 1908 – April 24, 1971) was an American musician, composer, conductor and arranger. Hayton's trademark was a captain's hat, which he always wore at a rakish angle.

== Early life ==
Hayton was born in New York City to a Jewish family. The son of a Manhattan restaurateur, he developed a penchant for the piano when six years old, showing unusual interest in the early classics from the rolls of the family player piano. Although neither of his parents was a tutored musician, both were keen followers of the concert hall. Hayton attended many concerts with them. His parents disliked "Jazz", and it was not until Hayton was 16 that he really discovered it. He left high school to become pianist with the Broadway Hotel Orchestra of Cass Hagen, a boyhood friend.

== Career ==
While playing at the Park Central, Hayton was heard by Paul Whiteman and immediately engaged by him in April 1928 as second pianist, playing piano and celeste as well as acting as a part-time arranger. Whilst with the Paul Whiteman orchestra, he played with musicians such as Frankie Trumbauer, Bix Beiderbecke, Red Nichols and Joe Venuti. He also became friendly with Bing Crosby, then a member of The Rhythm Boys. In May 1930, Whiteman had to thin down his orchestra as theatre audiences fell due to the economic problems of the day and because of the impact of radio. Hayton and Eddie Lang were amongst the ten members of the band released. Hayton then joined the Charles Previn Orchestra which had a weekly assignment on radio in the Camel Pleasure Hour.

The chance came to re-join Bing Crosby who by late 1931 had enjoyed tremendous success on record, radio and the stage. Starting in April 1932, Crosby embarked on a tour of Paramount-Publix theaters, working across the country to Hollywood where he was to make the film The Big Broadcast. At each location, he continued to broadcast his radio show until he reached the West Coast. Lennie Hayton and Eddie Lang provided the musical support to Crosby on his theatre appearances and on his radio shows. In Chicago in May 1932, Hayton led an orchestra for his first recordings with the singer. "Cabin in the Cotton", "Love Me Tonight" and "Some of These Days" were all hits. In September 1932, Crosby again went on tour with Hayton accompanying him on piano. In New York on October 25, 1932, Hayton led the orchestra for one of Bing Crosby's most famous recordings, "Brother, Can You Spare a Dime?" which went to the top of the charts of the day. In January 1933, Hayton became the musical director for the Chesterfield radio series "Music That Satisfies" which again featured Crosby and ran for 13 weeks.

Hayton's involvement with Bing Crosby continued, and he was made musical director for the singer's film Going Hollywood (1933), which was a Metro-Goldwyn-Mayer production. This was to be the start of a major career for Hayton in Hollywood. He continued to work with Crosby on radio (Bing Crosby Entertains) and record for a while but in 1940 he became a musical director for Metro-Goldwyn-Mayer and guided it through its prime years as foremost producer of movie musicals. Up until his retirement from the post in 1953, he racked up four Oscar nominations: for the Judy Garland musicals The Harvey Girls (1946) and The Pirate (1948). Hayton won the Academy Award for music for On the Town with Roger Edens in 1950. Lennie Hayton also arranged the music for Singin' in the Rain in 1952. Hayton notched up two more nominations—one in 1968 for the unsuccessful Julie Andrews musical Star! and his last the following year for the Barbra Streisand vehicle Hello, Dolly! co-composed with Lionel Newman, which brought him his second and final Oscar. In 1970, Hayton arranged Frank Sinatra's first attempt at the George Harrison composition "Something". However, Sinatra later began using a Nelson Riddle arrangement of the song in concert performances and, in 1979, he put the Riddle version on record. Hayton composed "Apple Blossoms" with Joe Venuti, Frankie Trumbauer, and Eddie Lang. His other compositions included "Flying Fingers", "The Stage is Set", "Mood Hollywood" with Jimmy Dorsey, and "Midnight Mood". Hayton also co-arranged the Hoagy Carmichael composition "Stardust" with Artie Shaw, for Shaw's recording of it in 1940, for Bluebird Records.

== Personal life and death ==
Hayton's first marriage was to Helen Maude Gifford, also named Bubs Gelderman, who died in 1943. Lennie Hayton met Lena Horne when both were under contract to MGM and married her in December 1947 in Paris. Throughout the marriage, Hayton also acted as Horne's music director. Facing the stresses and pressures of an interracial relationship, which was still relatively rare in that time period, Hayton and Horne had a tumultuous marriage. She later admitted in a 1980 Ebony interview she had married Hayton primarily to advance her career, and cross the "color-line" in show business, but had learned to love him very much. Horne and Hayton were separated for most of the 1960s. Always a heavy drinker and smoker, Hayton died of a heart attack while separated from Horne, in Palm Springs, California in 1971. He was buried in the Hollywood Forever Cemetery in Hollywood, California.

== Awards ==
=== Academy Awards ===
Year	Film	Award	Result
1946	The Harvey Girls	Academy Award for Best Original Score (Scoring of a Musical Picture)	Nominated
1948	The Pirate	Academy Award for Best Original Score (Scoring of a Musical Picture)	Nominated
1949	On the Town	Academy Award for Best Original Score (Scoring of a Musical Picture)	Won
1952	Singin' in the Rain	Academy Award for Best Original Score (Scoring of a Musical Picture)	Nominated
1968	Star!	Academy Award for Best Original Score (of a Musical Picture-original or adaptation)	Nominated
1969	Hello, Dolly!	Academy Award for Best Original Score (of a Musical Picture-original or adaptation)	Won
