= Blues =

Music genre originating in 1860s

- Stylistic origins: Work songs; spirituals; folk music
- Cultural origins: 1860s, Deep South, U.S.
- Derivative forms: Bluegrass; country; western; jazz; jug band; ragtime; rhythm and blues; rock and roll; hip-hop; contemporary R&B; psychedelic rock; acid rock

Subgenres
- Boogie-woogie; classic female blues; country blues; Delta blues; dirty blues; electric blues; hokum blues; jump blues (complete list)

Fusion genres
- Biker metal; blues rock; desert blues; gospel blues; punk blues; soul blues

Regional scenes
- British blues; Canadian blues; Chicago blues; Delta blues; Detroit blues; Hill country blues; Kansas City blues; Louisiana blues; Memphis blues; New Orleans blues; Piedmont blues; St. Louis blues; Swamp blues; Texas blues; West Coast blues

Other topics
- List of genres; list of musicians; lists of musicians by genre; list of standards; origins; African-American music

Blues is a music genre and musical form that originated among African Americans in the Deep South of the United States around the 1860s. Blues has incorporated spirituals, work songs, field hollers, shouts, chants, and rhymed simple narrative ballads from the African-American culture. The blues form is ubiquitous in jazz, rhythm and blues, and rock and roll, and is characterized by the call-and-response pattern, the blues scale, and specific chord progressions, of which the twelve-bar blues is the most common. Blue notes (or "worried notes"), usually thirds, fifths or sevenths flattened in pitch, are also an essential part of the sound. Blues shuffles or walking bass reinforce the trance-like rhythm and form a repetitive effect known as the groove.

Blues music is characterized by its lyrics, bass lines, and instrumentation. Early traditional blues verses consisted of a single line repeated four times. It was only in the first decades of the 20th century that the most common current structure became standard: the AAB pattern, consisting of a line sung over the four first bars, its repetition over the next four, and then a longer concluding line over the last bars. Early blues frequently took the form of a loose narrative, often relating the racial segregation, discrimination, and other challenges experienced by African Americans. By this time, the blues has coalesced into an important aspect of African American culture, expressing the hardships and culture of Black communities. These narratives often detailed the specific harsh realities of the Deep South, including the difficulties of sharecropping and the economic devastation caused by the boll weevil.

Many elements, such as the call-and-response format and the use of blue notes, can be traced back to the music of Africa. The origins of the blues are also closely related to the religious music of the African-American community, the spirituals. The first appearance of the blues is often dated to after the ending of slavery, with the development of juke joints occurring later. It is associated with the newly acquired freedom of the former slaves. Chroniclers began to report about blues music at the dawn of the 20th century. The first publication of blues sheet music was in 1908. Blues has since evolved from unaccompanied vocal music and oral traditions of slaves into a wide variety of styles and subgenres. Blues subgenres include country blues, Delta blues and Piedmont blues, as well as urban blues styles such as Chicago blues and West Coast blues. World War II marked the transition from acoustic to electric blues and the progressive opening of blues music to a wider audience, especially white listeners. In the 1960s and 1970s, a hybrid form called blues rock developed, which blended blues styles with rock music.

== Etymology ==
The term 'Blues' may have originated from "blue devils", meaning melancholy and sadness. An early use of the term in this sense is in George Colman's one-act farce Blue Devils (1798). The phrase 'blue devils' may also have been derived from a British usage of the 1600s referring to the "intense visual hallucinations that can accompany severe alcohol withdrawal". As time went on, the phrase lost the reference to devils and came to mean a state of agitation or depression. By the 1800s in the United States, the term "blues" was associated with drinking alcohol, a meaning which survives in the phrase 'blue law', which prohibits the sale of alcohol on Sunday.

In 1827, it was in the sense of a sad state of mind that John James Audubon wrote to his wife that he "had the blues".

In Henry David Thoreau's book Walden, he mentions "the blues" in the chapter reflecting on his time in solitude. He wrote his account of his personal quest in 1845, although it was not published until 1854.

The phrase "the blues" was written by Charlotte Forten, then aged 25, in her diary on December 14, 1862. She was a free-born Black woman from Pennsylvania who was working as a schoolteacher in South Carolina, instructing both slaves and freedmen, and wrote that she "came home with the blues" because she felt lonesome and pitied herself. She overcame her depression and later noted a number of songs, such as "Poor Rosy", that were popular among the slaves. Although she admitted being unable to describe the manner of singing she heard, Forten wrote that the songs "can't be sung without a full heart and a troubled spirit", conditions that have inspired countless blues songs.

Though the use of the phrase in African-American music may be older, it has been attested to in print since 1912, when Hart Wand's "Dallas Blues" became the first copyrighted blues composition. In lyrics, the phrase is often used to describe a depressed mood.

== Lyrics ==
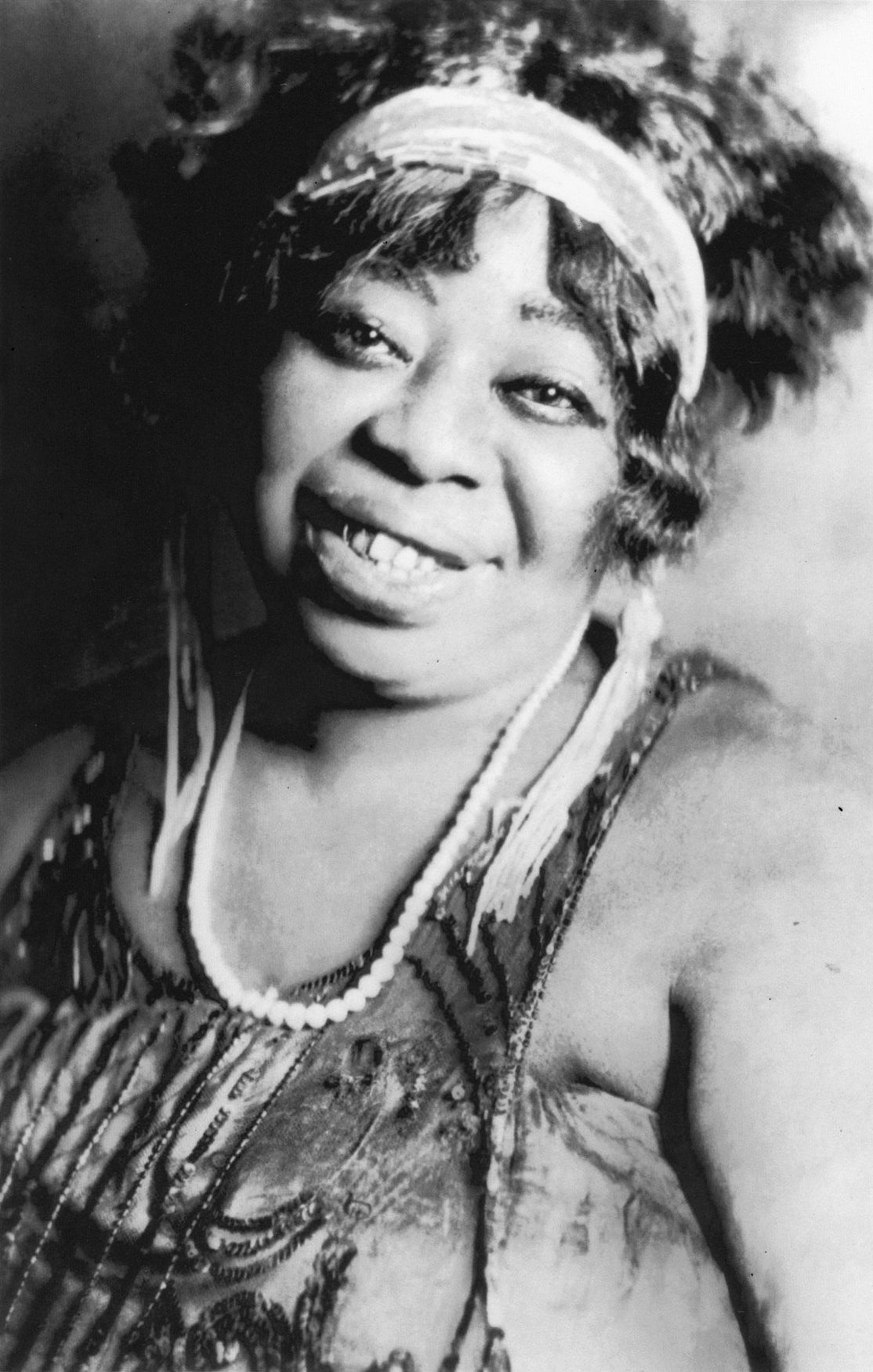
American blues singer Ma Rainey (1886–1939), the "Mother of the Blues"

Early traditional blues verses often consisted of a single line repeated four times. However, the most common structure of blues lyrics today was established in the first few decades of the 20th century, known as the "AAB" pattern. This structure consists of a line sung over the first four bars, its repetition over the next four, and a longer concluding line over the last bars. This pattern can be heard in some of the first published blues songs, such as "Dallas Blues" (1912) and "Saint Louis Blues" (1914). According to W.C. Handy, the "AAB" pattern was adopted to avoid the monotony of lines repeated three times. The lyrics are often sung in a rhythmic talk style rather than a melody, resembling a form of talking blues.

Early blues frequently took the form of a loose narrative. African-American singers voiced their "personal woes in a world of harsh reality: a lost love, the cruelty of police officers, oppression at the hands of white folk, [and] hard times." This melancholy has led to the suggestion of an Igbo origin for blues, because of the reputation the Igbo had throughout plantations in the Americas for their melancholic music and outlook on life when they were enslaved. Other historians have argued that there is little evidence of Sub-Sahelian influence in the blues as "elaborate polyrhythm, percussion on African drums (as opposed to European drums), [and] collective participation" which are characteristic of West-Central African music below the savannah, are conspicuously absent. According to the historian Paul Oliver, "the roots of the blues were not to be found in the coastal and forest regions of Africa. Rather... the blues was rooted in ... the savanna hinterland, from Senegambia through Mali, Burkina Faso, Northern Ghana, Niger, and northern Nigeria". Additionally, ethnomusicologist John Storm Roberts has argued that "The parallels between African savanna-belt string-playing and the techniques of many blues guitarists are remarkable. The big kora of Senegal and Guinea are played in a rhythmic-melodic style that uses constantly changing rhythms, often providing a ground bass overlaid with complex treble patterns, while vocal supplies a third rhythmic layer. Similar techniques can be found in hundreds of blues records."

The lyrics often relate troubles experienced within African American society. For instance Blind Lemon Jefferson's "Rising High Water Blues" (1927) tells of the Great Mississippi Flood of 1927:

Backwater rising, Southern peoples can't make no time
I said, backwater rising, Southern peoples can't make no time
And I can't get no hearing from that Memphis girl of mine

Although the blues gained an association with misery and oppression, the lyrics could also be humorous and raunchy:

Rebecca, Rebecca, get your big legs off of me,
Rebecca, Rebecca, get your big legs off of me,
It may be sending you baby, but it's worrying the hell out of me.

Hokum blues celebrated both comedic lyrical content and a boisterous, farcical performance style. Tampa Red and Georgia Tom's "It's Tight Like That" (1928) is a sly wordplay with the double meaning of being "tight" with someone, coupled with a more salacious physical familiarity. Blues songs with sexually explicit lyrics were known as dirty blues. The lyrical content became slightly simpler in postwar blues, which tended to focus on relationship woes or sexual worries. Lyrical themes that frequently appeared in prewar blues, such as economic depression, farming, devils, gambling, magic, floods and drought, were less common in postwar blues.

The writer Ed Morales claimed that Yoruba mythology played a part in early blues, citing Robert Johnson's "Cross Road Blues" as a "thinly veiled reference to Eleggua, the orisha in charge of the crossroads." However, the Christian influence was far more obvious. The repertoires of many seminal blues artists, such as Charley Patton and Skip James, included religious songs or spirituals. Reverend Gary Davis and Blind Willie Johnson are examples of artists often categorized as blues musicians for their music, although their lyrics clearly belong to spirituals.

== Form ==
The blues form typically uses a repeating chord progression, most commonly the twelve-bar sequence. Vocal and instrumental patterns frequently display a call-and-response structure rooted in African and African-American musical traditions.

Early blues at the turn of the 20th century was not governed by a single standardized structure. Folklorist Howard W. Odum documented secular songs from circa 1908–1910 that featured freely repeated or extended verses and flexible stanzaic forms. David Evans likewise notes that early blues allowed considerable structural variation before becoming more standardized through commercial recording.

Chords for a 12-bar blues

C	C	C	C
F	F	C	C
G	F	C	C

With the rise of recorded blues singers such as Bessie Smith, the twelve-bar form became increasingly common during the 1920s and 1930s. Other structures, including 8-bar and 16-bar progressions, are also widespread. Examples include "How Long, How Long Blues", "Trouble in Mind", Big Bill Broonzy's "Key to the Highway", Ray Charles's "Sweet 16 Bars", and Herbie Hancock's "Watermelon Man". More unusual forms appear as well, such as the nine-bar "Sitting on Top of the World" by Walter Vinson.

A typical twelve-bar blues is set in 4/4 time signature and uses three closely related chords arranged in a fixed sequence. These bars are often grouped into three four-bar phrases that align with an "AAB" call-and-response pattern: an opening phrase over the tonic (I), a repeated phrase over the subdominant (IV), and a concluding response over the dominant (V), with the final measures frequently forming a turnaround. The chords are commonly played as dominant sevenths, contributing to the genre's characteristic harmonic color.

A minor blues scale with added "blue note";

Melodic lines typically draw on the minor pentatonic while highlighting blue notes, creating expressive tension through the blending of major and minor elements. This flexibility supports expressive phrasing and improvisation.

Rhythmic motion is shaped by shuffle patterns and steady bass lines, producing a forward-driving groove. This rolling feel became central to R&B and swing music. A defining feature of blues rhythm is the backbeat, with accents on the second and fourth beats reinforcing the music's characteristic swing and drive.

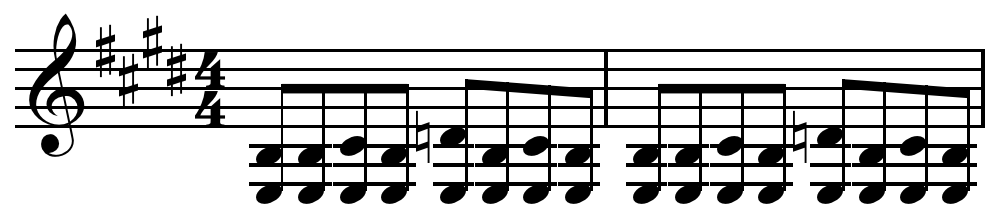
Typical blues shuffle rhythm;

== History ==
=== Origin ===
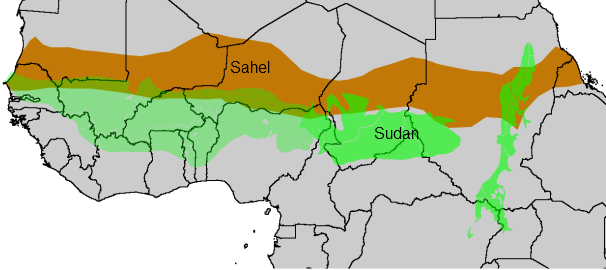
The Sahel (brown) and the Sudan (green)

Blues historians and historians of African American music such as Paul Oliver and Samuel Charters have suggested that the essential elements of the blues originated in the Sahel region of West Africa, brought over by Africans via the slave trade. Whereas the African slaves brought to South America and the Caribbean were largely from percussion based cultures in southern coastal west Africa (like southern Nigeria), central Africa and Bantu speaking parts of Africa lacked many elements that created the blues. Many of the slaves brought to North America were from the Sahel region and more familiar with stringed instruments, basing the banjo on string instruments from the Sahel such as the akonting. Charters found that many Sahelian slaves were from Muslim cultures and favored stringed, melodic, and solo melismatic singing, which differed from the drum-based music of other African regions, who generally favoured drumming and group chants. These traditions, which were sometimes permitted by plantation owners who feared drums as tool of rebellion, thus evolved into the blues.

The historian Sylviane Diouf and ethnomusicologist Gerhard Kubik identify Islamic music as an influence on blues music. Diouf notes a striking resemblance between the Islamic call to prayer (originating from Bilal ibn Rabah, an Abyssinian African Muslim in the early 7th century) and 19th-century field holler music, noting that both have similar lyrics praising God, melody, note changes, "words that seem to quiver and shake" in the vocal chords, dramatic changes in musical scales, and nasal intonation. She attributes the origins of field holler music to African Muslim slaves who accounted for an estimated 30% of African slaves in America. According to Kubik, "the vocal style of many blues singers using melisma, wavy intonation, and so forth is a heritage of that large region of The Western Sahel that had been in contact with the Islamic world via the Maghreb since the seventh and eighth centuries ". Despite the Islamic influence, Arabic music elements have not had any influence in the Sahel region according to kubik "This style has remained unaffected by the Arabic musical intrusion which reached West Africa along the trans-Saharan trading routes".Many of the elements that characterise early blues such as the blues scale, polyrhythm, the blue notes, pitch instability declamatory and homophonic melismatic vocals, can be found not just in the West African Sahel, but also in the eastern Sahel in Sudanese music, suggesting cross fertilisation along the Sahel, The blues with its origin in the American South has likely evolved as a fusion of an African just intonation scale with European 12-tone musical instruments and harmony. The result has been a uniquely American music which is still widely practiced in its original form and is at the foundation of another genre, American jazz.

Blue note—a hallmark of blues music and rhythm and blues characterised by flattened thirds, fifths, or sevenths—has deep roots in the musical traditions of the Sahel region of West Africa, making African American popular music like the blues having a Sahelian-based origin in contrast to the more percussion based Afro-Brazilian music and Afro-Cuban music which have more of a southern coastal west African, Central African and Bantu influence; where the blue note is absent and non-Muslim slaves who generally favoured drums and group chants. The Griot tradition of the Sahel also may have influenced talking blues and by extension hip-hop. The Griot tradition is also generally absent in Bantu speaking central, Eastern and Southern African cultures, again pointing to a Sahelian foundation (along with European 12-tone musical instruments and Harmony) of African American music.

Hart Wand's "Dallas Blues" was published in 1912; W.C. Handy's "The Memphis Blues" followed in the same year. The first recording by an African-American singer was Mamie Smith's 1920 rendition of Perry Bradford's "Crazy Blues". But the origins of the blues were some decades earlier, probably around 1890. This music is poorly documented, partly because of racial discrimination in U.S. society, including academic circles, and partly because of the low rate of literacy among rural African Americans at the time.

Reports of blues music in southern Texas and the Deep South were written at the dawn of the 20th century. Charles Peabody mentioned the appearance of blues music at Clarksdale, Mississippi, and Gate Thomas reported similar songs in southern Texas around 1901–1902. These observations coincide more or less with the recollections of Jelly Roll Morton, who said he first heard blues music in New Orleans in 1902; Ma Rainey, who remembered first hearing the blues in the same year in Missouri; and W.C. Handy, who first heard the blues in Tutwiler, Mississippi, in 1903. The first extensive research in the field was performed by Howard W. Odum, who published an anthology of folk songs from Lafayette County, Mississippi, and Newton County, Georgia, between 1905 and 1908. The first non-commercial recordings of blues music, termed proto-blues by Paul Oliver, were made by Odum for research purposes at the beginning of the 20th century. They are now lost.

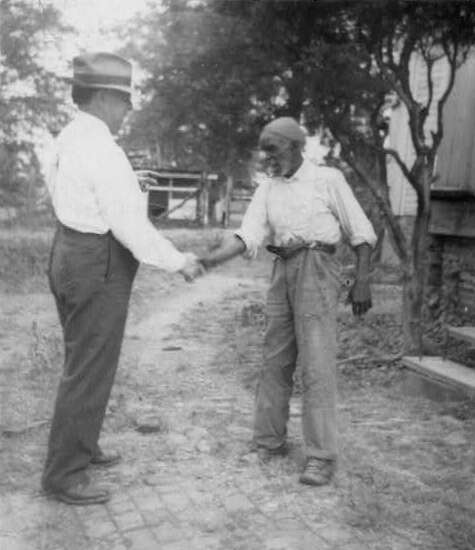
Musicologist John Lomax (left) shaking hands with musician "Uncle" Rich Brown in Sumterville, Alabama

Other recordings that are still available were made in 1924 by Lawrence Gellert. Later, several recordings were made by Robert W. Gordon, who became head of the Archive of American Folk Songs of the Library of Congress. Gordon's successor at the library was John Lomax. In the 1930s, Lomax and his son Alan made a large number of non-commercial blues recordings that testify to the huge variety of proto-blues styles, such as field hollers and ring shouts. A record of blues music as it existed before 1920 can also be found in the recordings of artists such as Lead Belly and Henry Thomas. All these sources show the existence of many different structures distinct from twelve-, eight-, or sixteen-bar. The social and economic reasons for the appearance of the blues are not fully known. The first appearance of the blues is usually dated after the Emancipation Act of 1863, between 1860s and 1890s, a period that coincides with post-emancipation and later, the establishment of juke joints as places where African Americans went to listen to music, dance, or gamble after a hard day's work. This period corresponds to the transition from slavery to sharecropping, small-scale agricultural production, and the expansion of railroads in the southern United States. Several scholars characterize the development of blues music in the early 1900s as a move from group performance to individualized performance. They argue that the development of the blues is associated with the newly acquired freedom of the enslaved people.

According to Lawrence Levine, "there was a direct relationship between the national ideological emphasis upon the individual, the popularity of Booker T. Washington's teachings, and the rise of the blues." Levine stated that "psychologically, socially, and economically, African-Americans were being acculturated in a way that would have been impossible during slavery, and it is hardly surprising that their secular music reflected this as much as their religious music did."

There are few characteristics common to all blues music, because the genre took its shape from the idiosyncrasies of individual performers. However, there are some characteristics that were present long before the creation of the modern blues. Call-and-response shouts were an early form of blues-like music; they were a "functional expression ... style without accompaniment or harmony and unbounded by the formality of any particular musical structure". A form of this pre-blues was heard in slave ring shouts and field hollers, expanded into "simple solo songs laden with emotional content".

Blues has evolved from the unaccompanied vocal music and oral traditions of slaves imported from West Africa and Black Americans in rural areas into a wide variety of styles and subgenres, with regional variations across the United States. Although blues (as it is now known) can be seen as a musical style based on both European harmonic structure and the African call-and-response tradition that transformed into an interplay of voice and guitar, the blues form itself bears no resemblance to the melodic styles of the West African griots. Additionally, there are theories that the four-beats-per-measure structure of the blues might have its origins in the Native American tradition of pow wow drumming. Some scholars identify strong influences on the blues from the melodic structures of certain West African musical styles of the Savanna and Sahel. Lucy Durran finds similarities with the melodies of the Bambara people, and to a lesser degree, the Soninke people and Wolof people, but not as much of the Mandinka people. Gerard Kubik finds similarities to the melodic styles of both the west African savanna and central Africa, both of which were sources of enslaved people.

No specific African musical form can be identified as the single direct ancestor of the blues. However the call-and-response format can be traced back to the music of Africa. That blue notes predate their use in blues and have an African origin is attested to by "A Negro Love Song", by the English composer Samuel Coleridge-Taylor, from his African Suite for Piano, written in 1898, which contains blue third and seventh notes.

The Diddley bow (a homemade one-stringed instrument found in parts of the American South sometimes referred to as a jitterbug or a one-string in the early twentieth century) and the banjo are African-derived instruments that may have helped in the transfer of African performance techniques into the early blues instrumental vocabulary. The banjo seems to be directly imported from West African music. It is similar to the musical instrument that griots and other Africans such as the Igbo played (called halam or akonting by African peoples such as the Wolof, Fula and Mandinka). However, in the 1920s, when country blues began to be recorded, the use of the banjo in blues music was quite marginal and limited to individuals such as Papa Charlie Jackson and later Gus Cannon.

Blues music also adopted elements from the "Ethiopian airs", minstrel shows and Negro spirituals, including instrumental and harmonic accompaniment. The style also was closely related to ragtime, which developed at about the same time, though the blues better preserved "the original melodic patterns of African music".

The musical forms and styles that are now considered the blues as well as modern country music arose in the same regions of the southern United States during the 19th century. Recorded blues and country music can be found as far back as the 1920s, when the record industry created the marketing categories "race music" and "hillbilly music" to sell music by Blacks for Blacks and by whites for whites, respectively. At the time, there was no clear musical division between "blues" and "country", except for the ethnicity of the performer, and even that was sometimes documented incorrectly by record companies.

Though musicologists can now attempt to define the blues narrowly in terms of certain chord structures and lyric forms thought to have originated in West Africa, audiences originally heard the music in a far more general way: it was simply the music of the rural South, notably the Mississippi Delta. Black and white musicians shared the same repertoire and thought of themselves as "songsters" rather than blues musicians. The notion of blues as a separate genre arose during the Black migration from the countryside to urban areas in the 1920s and the simultaneous development of the recording industry. Blues became a code word for a record designed to sell to Black listeners.

The origins of the blues are closely related to the religious music of Afro-American community, the spirituals. The origins of spirituals go back much further than the blues, usually dating back to the middle of the 18th century, when the slaves were Christianized and began to sing and play Christian hymns, in particular those of Isaac Watts, which were very popular. Before the blues gained its formal definition in terms of chord progressions, it was defined as the secular counterpart of spirituals. It was the low-down music played by rural Blacks.

Depending on the religious community a musician belonged to, it was more or less considered a sin to play this low-down music: blues was the devil's music. Musicians were therefore segregated into two categories: gospel singers and blues singers, guitar preachers and songsters. However, when rural Black music began to be recorded in the 1920s, both categories of musicians used similar techniques: call-and-response patterns, blue notes, and slide guitars. Gospel music was nevertheless using musical forms that were compatible with Christian hymns and therefore less marked by the blues form than its secular counterpart.

=== Pre-war blues ===
The American sheet music publishing industry produced a great deal of ragtime music. By 1912, the sheet music industry had published three popular blues-like compositions, precipitating the Tin Pan Alley adoption of blues elements: "Baby Seals' Blues", by Baby Franklin Seals (arranged by Artie Matthews); "Dallas Blues", by Hart Wand; and "The Memphis Blues", by W.C. Handy.

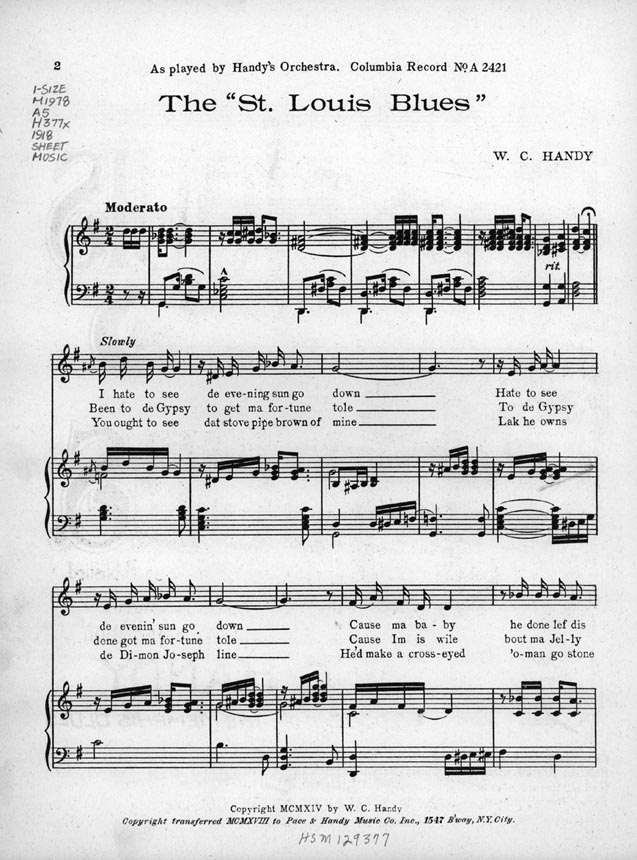
Sheet music from "Saint Louis Blues" (1914)

Handy was a formally trained musician, composer, and arranger who helped to popularize the blues by transcribing and orchestrating blues in an almost symphonic style, with bands and singers. He became a popular and prolific composer, and billed himself as the "Father of the Blues"; however, his compositions can be described as a fusion of blues with ragtime and jazz, a merger facilitated using the Cuban habanera rhythm that had long been a part of ragtime; Handy's signature work was the "Saint Louis Blues".

In the 1920s, the blues became a major element of African-American and American popular music, also reaching white audiences via Handy's arrangements and the classic female blues performers. These female performers became perhaps the first African-American "superstars", and their recording sales demonstrated "a huge appetite for records made by and for Black people." The blues evolved from informal performances in bars to entertainment in theaters. Blues performances were organized by the Theater Owners Booking Association in nightclubs such as the Cotton Club and juke joints such as the bars along Beale Street in Memphis. Several record companies, such as the American Record Corporation, Okeh Records, and Paramount Records, began to record African-American music.

As the recording industry grew, country blues performers like Bo Carter, Jimmie Rodgers, Blind Lemon Jefferson, Lonnie Johnson, Tampa Red, and Blind Blake became more popular in the African-American community. Kentucky-born Sylvester Weaver was in 1923 the first to record the slide guitar style, in which a guitar is fretted with a knife blade or the sawed-off neck of a bottle. The slide guitar became an important part of the Delta blues. The first blues recordings from the 1920s are categorized as a traditional, rural country blues and a more polished city or urban blues.

Country blues performers often improvised, either without accompaniment or with only a banjo or guitar. Regional styles of country blues varied widely in the early 20th century. The (Mississippi) Delta blues was a rootsy sparse style with passionate vocals accompanied by slide guitar. The little-recorded Robert Johnson combined elements of urban and rural blues. In addition to Robert Johnson, influential performers of this style included his predecessors Charley Patton and Son House. Singers such as Blind Willie McTell and Blind Boy Fuller performed in the southeastern "delicate and lyrical" Piedmont blues tradition, which used an elaborate ragtime-based fingerpicking guitar technique. Georgia also had an early slide tradition, with Curley Weaver, Tampa Red, "Barbecue Bob" Hicks and James "Kokomo" Arnold as representatives of this style.

The lively Memphis blues style, which developed in the 1920s and 1930s near Memphis, Tennessee, was influenced by jug bands such as the Memphis Jug Band or the Gus Cannon's Jug Stompers. Performers such as Frank Stokes, Sleepy John Estes, Robert Wilkins, Kansas Joe McCoy, Casey Bill Weldon, and Memphis Minnie used a variety of unusual instruments such as washboard, fiddle, kazoo or mandolin. Memphis Minnie was famous for her virtuoso guitar style. Pianist Memphis Slim began his career in Memphis, but his distinct style was smoother and had some swing elements. Many blues musicians based in Memphis moved to Chicago in the late 1930s or early 1940s and became part of the urban blues movement.

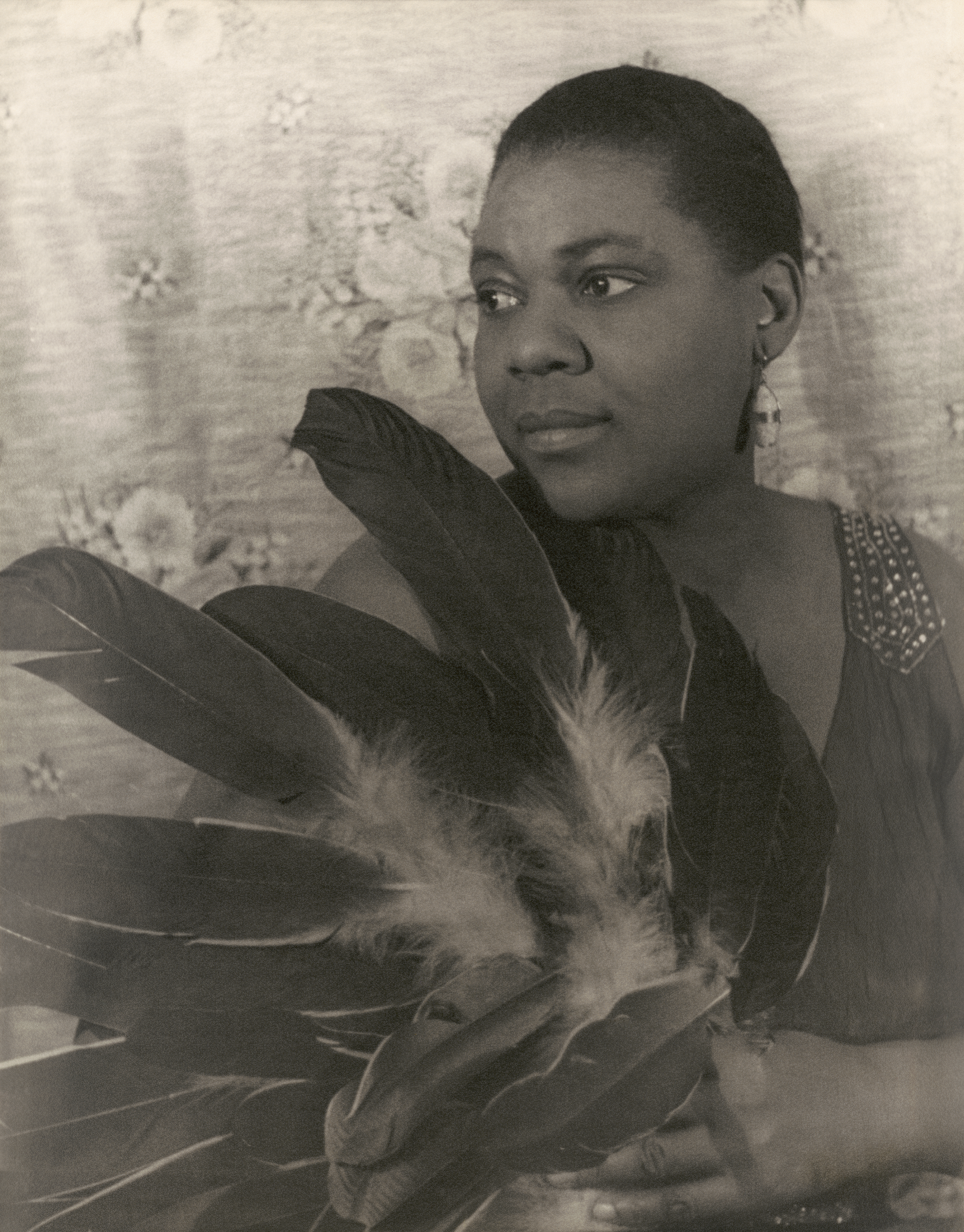
Bessie Smith, an early blues singer, known for her powerful voice

==== Urban blues ====
City or urban blues styles were more codified and elaborate, as performers were no longer within their local, immediate communities, and had to adapt to larger, more varied audiences' aesthetics. Classic female urban and vaudeville blues singers were popular in the 1920s, among them "the big three"—Gertrude "Ma" Rainey, Bessie Smith, and Lucille Bogan. Mamie Smith, more a vaudeville performer than a blues artist, was the first African American to record a blues song, in 1920; her second record, "Crazy Blues", sold 75,000 copies in its first month. Ma Rainey, the "Mother of Blues", and Bessie Smith each "[sang] around center tones, perhaps in order to project her voice more easily to the back of a room". Smith would "sing a song in an unusual key, and her artistry in bending and stretching notes with her beautiful, powerful contralto to accommodate her own interpretation was unsurpassed".

In 1920, the vaudeville singer Lucille Hegamin became the second Black woman to record blues when she recorded "The Jazz Me Blues", and Victoria Spivey, sometimes called Queen Victoria or Za Zu Girl, had a recording career that began in 1926 and spanned forty years. These recordings were typically labeled "race records" to distinguish them from records sold to white audiences. Nonetheless, the recordings of some of the classic female blues singers were purchased by white buyers as well. These blueswomen's contributions to the genre included "increased improvisation on melodic lines, unusual phrasing which altered the emphasis and impact of the lyrics, and vocal dramatics using shouts, groans, moans, and wails. The blues women thus effected changes in other types of popular singing that had spin-offs in jazz, Broadway musicals, torch songs of the 1930s and 1940s, gospel, rhythm and blues, and eventually rock and roll."

Urban male performers included popular Black musicians of the era, such as Tampa Red, Big Bill Broonzy and Leroy Carr. An important label of this era was the Chicago-based Bluebird Records. Before World War II, Tampa Red was sometimes referred to as "the Guitar Wizard". Carr accompanied himself on the piano with Scrapper Blackwell on guitar, a format that continued well into the 1950s with artists such as Charles Brown and even Nat "King" Cole.

A typical boogie-woogie bass line

Boogie-woogie was another important style of 1930s and early 1940s urban blues. While the style is often associated with solo piano, boogie-woogie was also used to accompany singers and, as a solo part, in bands and small combos. Boogie-woogie style was characterized by a regular bass figure, an ostinato or riff and shifts of level in the left hand, elaborating each chord and trills and decorations in the right hand. Boogie-woogie was pioneered by the Chicago-based Jimmy Yancey and the Boogie-Woogie Trio (Albert Ammons, Pete Johnson and Meade Lux Lewis). Chicago boogie-woogie performers included Clarence "Pine Top" Smith and Earl Hines, who "linked the propulsive left-hand rhythms of the ragtime pianists with melodic figures similar to those of Armstrong's trumpet in the right hand". The smooth Louisiana style of Professor Longhair and, more recently, Dr. John blends classic rhythm and blues with blues styles.

Another development in this period was big band blues. The "territory bands" operating out of Kansas City, the Bennie Moten orchestra, Jay McShann, and the Count Basie Orchestra were also concentrating on the blues, with 12-bar blues instrumentals such as Basie's "One O'Clock Jump" and "Jumpin' at the Woodside" and boisterous "blues shouting" by Jimmy Rushing on songs such as "Going to Chicago" and "Sent for You Yesterday". A well-known big band blues tune is Glenn Miller's "In the Mood". In the 1940s, the jump blues style developed. Jump blues grew up from the boogie-woogie wave and was strongly influenced by big band music. It uses saxophone or other brass instruments and the guitar in the rhythm section to create a jazzy, up-tempo sound with declamatory vocals. Jump blues tunes by Louis Jordan and Big Joe Turner, based in Kansas City, Missouri, influenced the development of later styles such as rock and roll and rhythm and blues. Dallas-born T-Bone Walker, who is often associated with the California blues style, performed a successful transition from the early urban blues à la Lonnie Johnson and Leroy Carr to the jump blues style and dominated the blues-jazz scene at Los Angeles during the 1940s.

=== 1950s ===
The transition from country blues to urban blues that began in the 1920s was driven by the successive waves of economic crisis and booms that led many rural Blacks to move to urban areas, in a movement known as the Great Migration. The long boom following World War II induced another massive migration of the African-American population, the Second Great Migration, which was accompanied by a significant increase of the real income of the urban Blacks. The new migrants constituted a new market for the music industry. The term race record, initially used by the music industry for African-American music, was replaced by the term rhythm and blues. This rapidly evolving market was mirrored by Billboard magazine's Rhythm & Blues chart. This marketing strategy reinforced trends in urban blues music such as the use of electric instruments and amplification and the generalization of the blues beat, the blues shuffle, which became ubiquitous in rhythm and blues (R&B). This commercial stream had important consequences for blues music, which, together with jazz and gospel music, became a component of R&B.

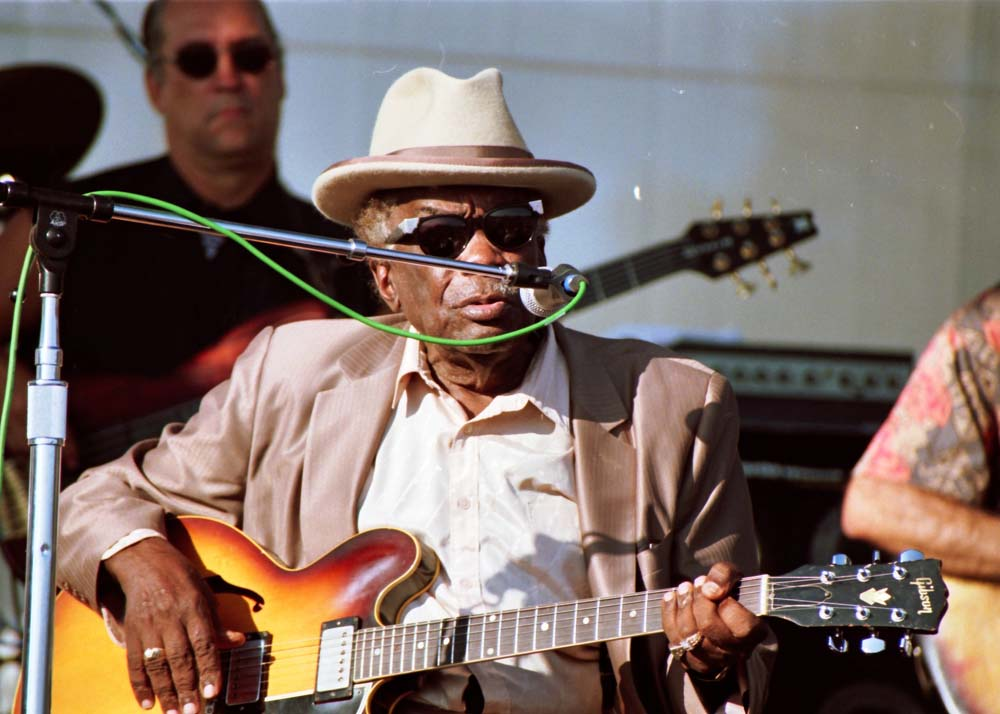
John Lee Hooker

After World War II, new styles of electric blues became popular in cities such as Chicago, Memphis, Detroit and St. Louis. Electric blues used electric guitars, double bass (gradually replaced by bass guitar), drums, and harmonica (or "blues harp") played through a microphone and a PA system or an overdriven guitar amplifier. Chicago became a center for electric blues from 1948 on, when Muddy Waters recorded his first success, "I Can't Be Satisfied". Chicago blues is influenced to a large extent by Delta blues, because many performers had migrated from the Mississippi region.

Howlin' Wolf, Muddy Waters, Willie Dixon and Jimmy Reed were all born in Mississippi and moved to Chicago during the Great Migration. Their style is characterized by the use of electric guitar, sometimes slide guitar, harmonica, and a rhythm section of bass and drums. The saxophonist J. T. Brown played in bands led by Elmore James and by J. B. Lenoir, but the saxophone was used as a backing instrument for rhythmic support more than as a lead instrument.

Little Walter, Sonny Boy Williamson (Rice Miller) and Sonny Terry are well known harmonica (called "harp" by blues musicians) players of the early Chicago blues scene. Other harp players such as Big Walter Horton were also influential. Muddy Waters and Elmore James were known for their innovative use of slide electric guitar. Howlin' Wolf and Muddy Waters were known for their deep, "gravelly" voices.

The bassist and prolific songwriter and composer Willie Dixon played a major role on the Chicago blues scene. He composed and wrote many standard blues songs of the period, such as "Hoochie Coochie Man", "I Just Want to Make Love to You" (both penned for Muddy Waters), and "Wang Dang Doodle" and "Back Door Man" for Howlin' Wolf. Most artists of the Chicago blues style recorded for the Chicago-based Chess Records and Checker Records labels. Smaller blues labels of this era included Vee-Jay Records and J.O.B. Records. During the early 1950s, the dominating Chicago labels were challenged by Sam Phillips' Sun Records company in Memphis, which recorded B. B. King and Howlin' Wolf before he moved to Chicago in 1960. After Phillips discovered Elvis Presley in 1954, the Sun label turned to the rapidly expanding white audience and started recording mostly rock 'n' roll.

In the 1950s, blues had a huge influence on mainstream American popular music. While popular musicians like Bo Diddley and Chuck Berry, both recording for Chess, were influenced by the Chicago blues, their enthusiastic playing styles departed from the melancholy aspects of blues. Chicago blues also influenced Louisiana's zydeco music, with Clifton Chenier using blues accents. Zydeco musicians used electric solo guitar and cajun arrangements of blues standards.

In England, electric blues took root there during a much acclaimed Muddy Waters tour in 1958. Waters, unsuspecting of his audience's tendency towards skiffle, an acoustic, softer brand of blues, turned up his amp and started to play his Chicago brand of electric blues. Although the audience was largely jolted by the performance, the performance influenced local musicians such as Alexis Korner and Cyril Davies to emulate this louder style, inspiring the British Invasion of the Rolling Stones and the Yardbirds.

In the late 1950s, a new blues style emerged on Chicago's West Side pioneered by Magic Sam, Buddy Guy, and Otis Rush on Cobra Records. The "West Side sound" had strong rhythmic support from a rhythm guitar, bass guitar, and drums and as perfected by Guy, Freddie King, Magic Slim, and Luther Allison, was dominated by amplified electric lead guitar. Expressive guitar solos were a key feature of this music.

Other blues artists, such as John Lee Hooker, had influences not directly related to the Chicago style. John Lee Hooker's blues is more "personal", based on Hooker's deep rough voice accompanied by a single electric guitar. Though not directly influenced by boogie-woogie, his "groovy" style is sometimes called "guitar boogie". His first hit, "Boogie Chillen", reached number 1 on the R&B charts in 1949.

By the late 1950s, the swamp blues genre developed near Baton Rouge, with performers such as Lightnin' Slim, Slim Harpo, Sam Myers and Jerry McCain around the producer J. D. "Jay" Miller and the Excello label. Strongly influenced by Jimmy Reed, swamp blues has a slower pace and a simpler use of the harmonica than the Chicago blues style performers such as Little Walter or Muddy Waters. Songs from this genre include "Scratch my Back," "She's Tough," and "I'm a King Bee". Alan Lomax's recordings of Mississippi Fred McDowell would eventually bring him wider attention on both the blues and folk circuit, with McDowell's droning style influencing North Mississippi hill country blues musicians.

=== 1960s and 1970s ===
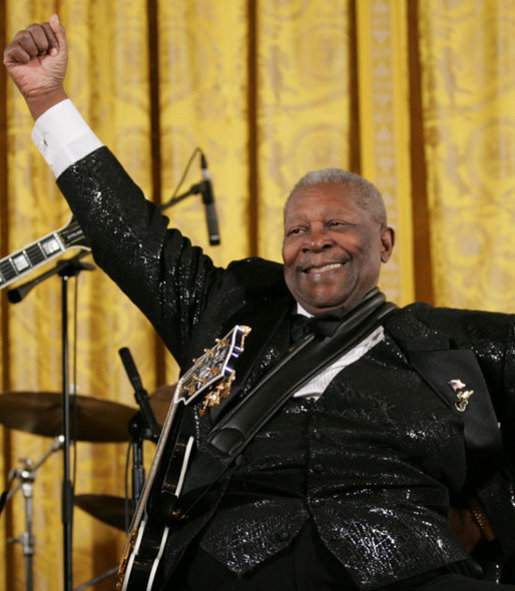
Blues legend B.B. King with his guitar, "Lucille"

By the beginning of the 1960s, genres influenced by African American music such as rock and roll and soul were part of mainstream popular music. White performers such as the Rolling Stones and the Beatles had brought African-American music to new audiences, within the U.S. and abroad. However, the blues wave that brought artists such as Muddy Waters to the foreground had stopped. Bluesmen such as Big Bill Broonzy and Willie Dixon started looking for new markets in Europe. Dick Waterman and the blues festivals he organized in Europe played a major role in propagating blues music abroad. In the UK, bands emulated U.S. blues legends, and UK blues rock-based bands had an influential role throughout the 1960s.

Blues performers such as John Lee Hooker and Muddy Waters continued to perform to enthusiastic audiences, inspiring new artists steeped in traditional blues, such as New York–born Taj Mahal. John Lee Hooker blended his blues style with rock elements and playing with younger white musicians, creating a musical style that can be heard on the 1971 album Endless Boogie. B. B. King's singing and virtuoso guitar technique earned him the eponymous title "king of the blues". King introduced a sophisticated style of guitar soloing based on fluid string bending and shimmering vibrato that influenced many later electric blues guitarists. In contrast to the Chicago style, King's band used strong brass support from a saxophone, trumpet, and trombone, instead of using slide guitar or harp. Tennessee-born Bobby "Blue" Bland, like B. B. King, also straddled the blues and R&B genres. During this period, Freddie King and Albert King often played with rock and soul musicians (Eric Clapton and Booker T & the MGs) and had a major influence on those styles of music.

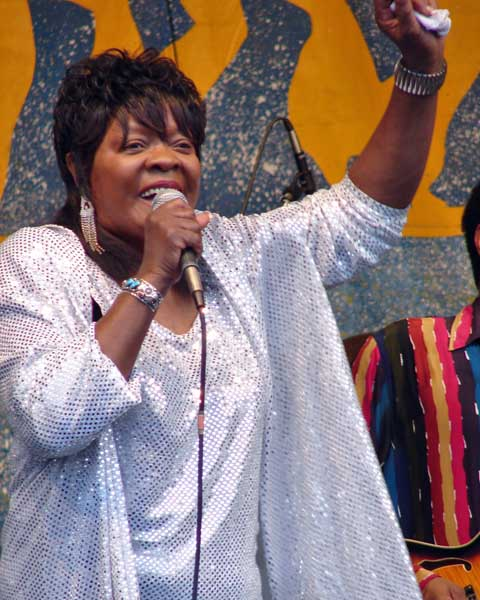
Koko Taylor, known as the "Queen of the Blues," was well known for her raspy, strong vocals.

The music of the civil rights movement and Free Speech Movement in the U.S. prompted a resurgence of interest in American roots music and early African-American music. As well, festivals such as the Newport Folk Festival brought traditional blues to a new audience, which helped to revive interest in prewar acoustic blues and performers such as Son House, Mississippi John Hurt, Skip James, and Reverend Gary Davis. Many compilations of classic prewar blues were republished by the Yazoo Records. J. B. Lenoir from the Chicago blues movement in the 1950s recorded several LPs using acoustic guitar, sometimes accompanied by Willie Dixon on the acoustic bass or drums. His songs, originally distributed only in Europe, commented on political issues such as racism or Vietnam War issues, which was unusual for this period. His album Alabama Blues contained a song with the following lyric:

I never will go back to Alabama, that is not the place for me,
I never will go back to Alabama, that is not the place for me.
You know they killed my sister and my brother
and the whole world let them peoples go down there free

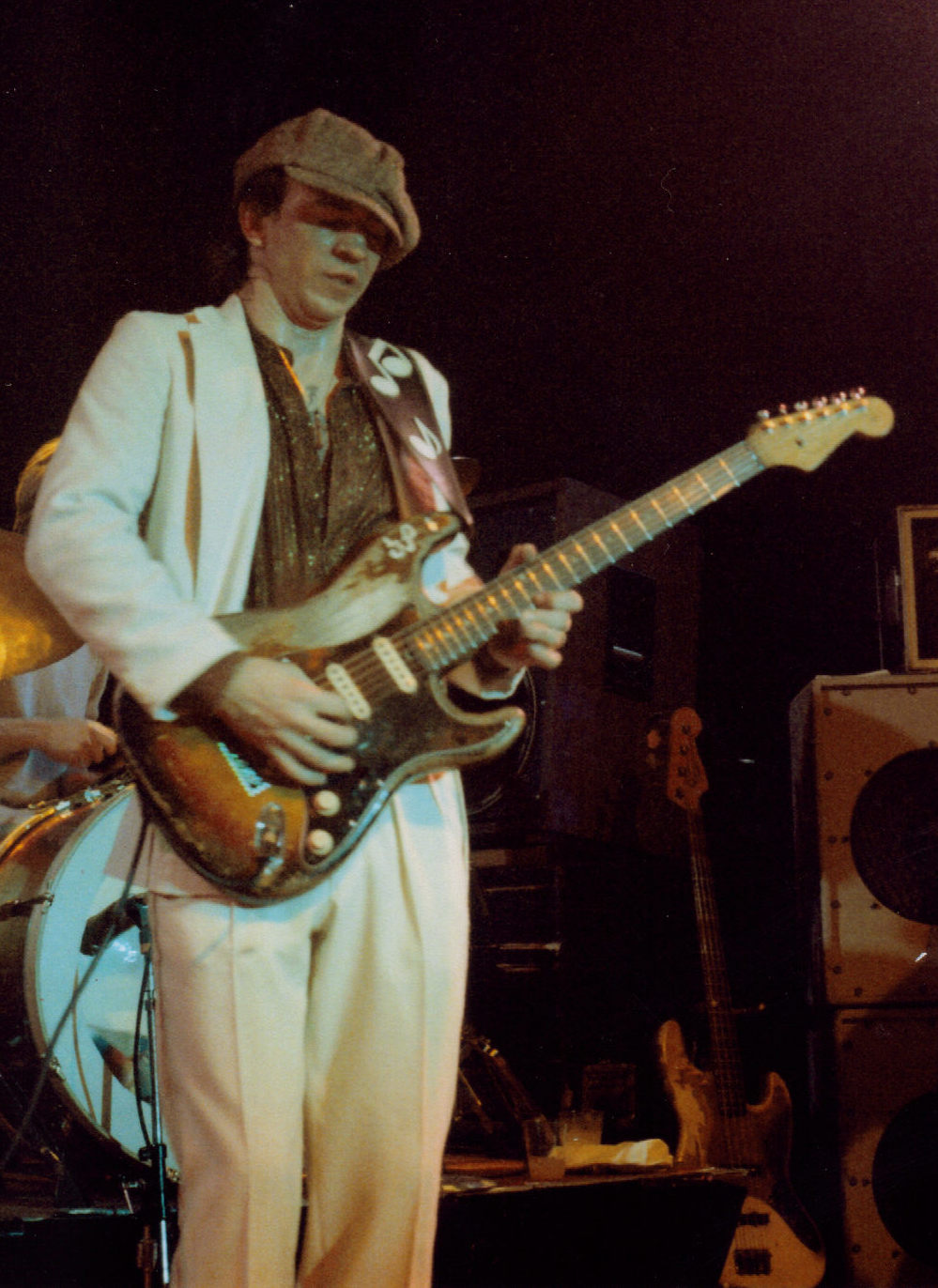
Texas blues guitarist Stevie Ray Vaughan, 1983

White audiences' interest in the blues during the 1960s increased due to the Chicago-based Paul Butterfield Blues Band, featuring guitarist Michael Bloomfield and singer/songwriter Nick Gravenites, and the British blues movement. The style of British blues developed in the UK, when musicians such as Cyril Davies, Alexis Korner's Blues Incorporated, Fleetwood Mac, John Mayall & the Bluesbreakers, the Rolling Stones, Animals, the Yardbirds, Aynsley Dunbar Retaliation, Chicken Shack, early Jethro Tull, Cream, and the Irish musician Rory Gallagher performed classic blues songs from the Delta or Chicago blues traditions.

In 1963, Amiri Baraka, then known as LeRoi Jones, was the first to write a book on the social history of the blues in Blues People: The Negro Music in White America. The British and blues musicians of the early 1960s inspired a number of American blues rock performers, including Canned Heat, Janis Joplin, Johnny Winter, the J. Geils Band, Ry Cooder, and the Allman Brothers Band. One blues rock performer, Jimi Hendrix, was a rarity in his field at the time: a Black man who played psychedelic rock. Hendrix was a skilled guitarist, and a pioneer in the innovative use of distortion and audio feedback in his music. Through these artists and others, blues music influenced the development of rock music. Later in the 1960s, British singer Jo Ann Kelly started her recording career. In the US, from the 1970s, female singers Bonnie Raitt and Phoebe Snow performed blues.

In the early 1970s, the Texas rock-blues style emerged, which used guitars in both solo and rhythm roles. In contrast with the West Side blues, the Texas style is strongly influenced by the British rock-blues movement. Major artists of the Texas style are Johnny Winter, Stevie Ray Vaughan, the Fabulous Thunderbirds (led by harmonica player and singer-songwriter Kim Wilson), and ZZ Top. These artists all began their musical careers in the 1970s but they did not achieve international success until the next decade.

=== 1980s to the present ===
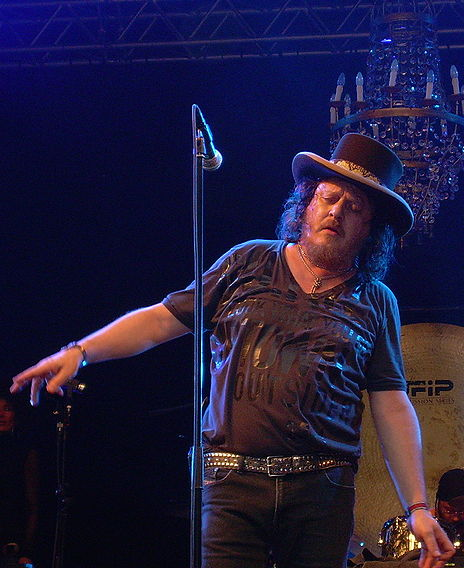
Italian singer Zucchero is credited as the "Father of Italian Blues", and is among the few European blues artists who still enjoy international success.

Since the 1980s, there has been a resurgence of interest in the blues among a certain part of the African-American population, particularly around Jackson, Mississippi, and other deep South regions. Often termed "soul blues" or "Southern soul", the music at the heart of this movement was given new life by the unexpected success of two particular recordings on the Jackson-based Malaco label: Z. Z. Hill's Down Home Blues (1982) and Little Milton's The Blues is Alright (1984). Contemporary African-American performers who work in this style of the blues include Bobby Rush, Denise LaSalle, Sir Charles Jones, Bettye LaVette, Marvin Sease, Peggy Scott-Adams, Clarence Carter, Charles Bradley, Trudy Lynn, Roy C, Barbara Carr, Willie Clayton, and Shirley Brown, among others.

During the 1980s, blues also continued in both traditional and new forms. In 1986, the album Strong Persuader announced Robert Cray as a major blues artist. The first Stevie Ray Vaughan recording Texas Flood was released in 1983, and the Texas-based guitarist exploded onto the international stage. John Lee Hooker's popularity was revived with the album The Healer in 1989. Eric Clapton, known for his performances with the Blues Breakers and Cream, made a comeback in the 1990s with his album Unplugged, in which he played some standard blues numbers on acoustic guitar.

However, beginning in the 1990s, digital multi-track recording and other technological advances and new marketing strategies, including video clip production, increased costs, challenging the spontaneity and improvisation that are an important component of blues music. In the 1980s and 1990s, blues publications such as Living Blues and Blues Revue were launched, major cities began forming blues societies, outdoor blues festivals became more common, and Tedeschi Trucks Band and Gov't Mule released blues rock albums. Female blues singers such as Bonnie Raitt, Susan Tedeschi, Sue Foley, and Shannon Curfman also recorded albums.

In the 1990s, the largely ignored hill country blues gained minor recognition in both blues and alternative rock music circles with northern Mississippi artists R. L. Burnside and Junior Kimbrough. Blues performers explored a range of musical genres, for example, from the broad array of nominees of the yearly Blues Music Awards (previously named W.C. Handy Awards) or of the Grammy Awards for Best Contemporary and Traditional Blues Album. The Billboard Blues Album chart provides an overview of current blues hits. Contemporary blues music is nurtured by several blues labels such as Alligator Records, Ruf Records, Severn Records, Chess Records (MCA), Delmark Records, NorthernBlues Music, Fat Possum Records, and Vanguard Records (Artemis Records). Some labels are famous for rediscovering and remastering blues rarities, including Arhoolie Records, Smithsonian Folkways Recordings (heir of Folkways Records), and Yazoo Records (Shanachie Records).

Themes and Emotional Expression

Many blues songs use the idea of sin and redemption to show the emotional world of the singer. This does not always mean the music is religious. Instead, singers used church language because it was familiar in their communities and helped them express feelings of guilt, struggle, and desire. In the Mississippi Delta, where poverty and discrimination were part of daily life, the theme of sin was a way for musicians to talk about broken relationships, unfair treatment, and survival.

The blues also used the idea of sin to question strict social rules. A singer might describe gambling, drinking, or cheating not just as bad behavior but as a reaction to hard times. This shows how the blues challenged moral expectations. Instead of judging people, the music gave performers a way to speak honestly about their lives. Scholars like Alan Lomax and Amiri Baraka note that this honest emotional expression helped shape the sound and feeling of the blues. It created a space where people could express personal truth without fear of being punished or ignored. African rhythms and storytelling traditions, as described by Robert Palmer, also helped musicians connect individual experiences to the wider community.

== Musical influence ==
Blues musical styles, forms (12-bar blues), melodies, and the blues scale have influenced many other genres of music, such as rock and roll, jazz, and popular music. Prominent jazz, folk, or rock performers, such as Louis Armstrong, Duke Ellington, Miles Davis, and Bob Dylan, have performed significant blues recordings. The blues scale is often used in popular songs like Harold Arlen's "Blues in the Night", blues ballads like "Since I Fell for You" and "Please Send Me Someone to Love", and even in orchestral works such as George Gershwin's "Rhapsody in Blue" and "Concerto in F". Gershwin's second "Prelude" for solo piano is an interesting example of a classical blues, maintaining the form with academic strictness. The blues scale is ubiquitous in modern popular music and informs many modal frames, especially the ladder of thirds used in rock music (for example, in "A Hard Day's Night"). Blues forms are used in the theme to the televised Batman, teen idol Fabian Forte's hit, "Turn Me Loose", country music star Jimmie Rodgers' music, and guitarist or vocalist Tracy Chapman's hit "Give Me One Reason".

"Blues singing is about emotion. Its influence on popular singing has been so widespread that, at least among males, singing and emoting have become almost identical—it is a matter of projection rather than hitting the notes."

— Robert Christgau, 1972

Early country bluesmen such as Skip James, Charley Patton, and Georgia Tom Dorsey played country and urban blues and had influences from spiritual singing. Dorsey helped to popularize Gospel music. Gospel music developed in the 1930s, with the Golden Gate Quartet. In the 1950s, soul music by Sam Cooke, Ray Charles, and James Brown used gospel and blues music elements. In the 1960s and 1970s, gospel and blues were merged in soul blues music. Funk music of the 1970s was influenced by soul; funk can be seen as an antecedent of hip-hop and contemporary R&B.

R&B music can be traced back to spirituals and blues. Musically, spirituals were a descendant of New England choral traditions, and in particular of Isaac Watts's hymns, mixed with African rhythms and call-and-response forms. Spirituals or religious chants in the African-American community are much better documented than the "low-down" blues. Spiritual singing developed because African-American communities could gather for mass or worship gatherings, which were called camp meetings.

Edward P. Comentale has noted how the blues was often used as a medium for art or self-expression, stating: "As heard from Delta shacks to Chicago tenements to Harlem cabarets, the blues proved—despite its pained origins—a remarkably flexible medium and a new arena for the shaping of identity and community."

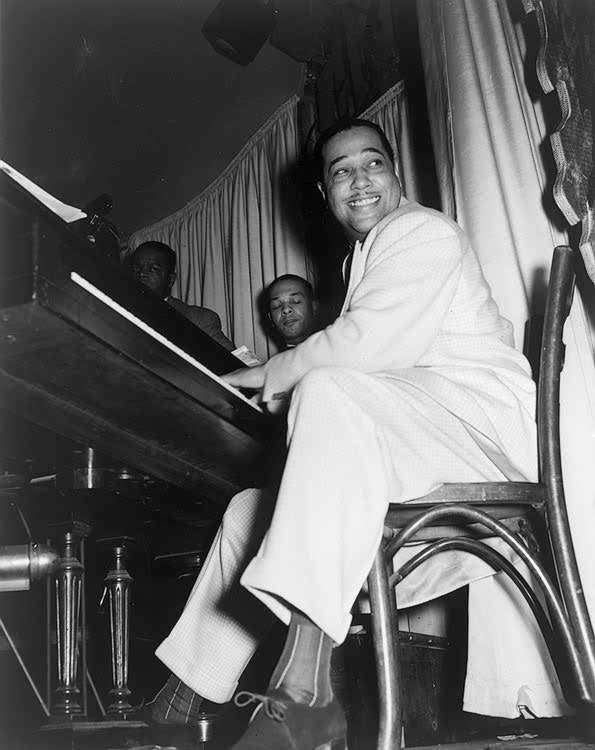
Duke Ellington straddled the big band and bebop genres. Ellington extensively used the blues form.

Before World War II, the boundaries between blues and jazz were less clear. Usually, jazz had harmonic structures stemming from brass bands, whereas blues had blues forms such as the 12-bar blues. However, the jump blues of the 1940s mixed both styles. After WWII, blues had a substantial influence on jazz. Bebop classics, such as Charlie Parker's "Now's the Time", used the blues form with the pentatonic scale and blue notes.

Bebop marked a major shift in the role of jazz, from a popular style of music for dancing to a "high-art", less accessible, cerebral "musician's music". The audience for both blues and jazz split, and the border between blues and jazz became more defined.

The blues' 12-bar structure and the blues scale was a major influence on rock and roll music. Rock and roll has been called "blues with a backbeat"; Carl Perkins called rockabilly "blues with a country beat". Rockabillies were also said to be 12-bar blues played with a bluegrass beat. "Hound Dog", with its unmodified 12-bar structure (in both harmony and lyrics) and a melody centered on flatted third of the tonic (and flatted seventh of the subdominant), is a blues song transformed into a rock and roll song. Jerry Lee Lewis's style of rock and roll was heavily influenced by the blues and its derivative boogie-woogie. His style of music was not exactly rockabilly but it has been often called real rock and roll (this is a label he shares with several African-American rock and roll performers).

Many early rock and roll songs are based on blues: "That's All Right Mama", "Johnny B. Goode", "Blue Suede Shoes", "Whole Lotta Shakin' Goin On", "Shake, Rattle, and Roll", and "Long Tall Sally". The early African-American rock musicians retained the sexual themes and innuendos of blues music: "Got a gal named Sue, knows just what to do" ("Tutti Frutti", Little Richard) or "See the girl with the red dress on, She can do the Birdland all night long" ("What'd I Say", Ray Charles). The 12-bar blues structure can be found even in novelty pop songs, such as Bob Dylan's "Obviously Five Believers" and Esther and Abi Ofarim's "Cinderella Rockefella".

Early country music was infused with the blues. Jimmie Rodgers, Moon Mullican, Bob Wills, Bill Monroe, and Hank Williams have all described themselves as blues singers and their music has a blues feel that is different, at first glance at least, from the later country-pop of artists like Eddy Arnold. Yet, if one looks back further, Arnold also started out singing bluesy songs like 'I'll Hold You in My Heart'. A lot of the 1970s-era "outlaw" country music by Willie Nelson and Waylon Jennings also borrowed from the blues. When Jerry Lee Lewis returned to country music after the decline of 1950s style rock and roll, he sang with a blues feel and often included blues standards on his albums.

== In popular culture ==
The music of Taj Mahal for the 1972 movie Sounder marked a revival of interest in acoustic blues.

Like many other genres, blues has been called the "devil's music" or "music of the devil", even of inciting violence and other poor behavior. In the early 20th century, the blues was considered disreputable, especially as white audiences began listening to the blues during the 1920s. The close association with the devil was actually a well-known characteristic of blues lyrics and culture between the 1920s and 1960s. The devil's connection to the blues has faded from popular memory since then for a number of reasons, other than in the narrow sense of Robert Johnson selling his soul to the devil at the crossroads. A study of the devil's role in the blues was published in 2017, called Beyond the Crossroads: The Devil & The Blues Tradition.

During the blues revival of the 1960s and 1970s, acoustic blues artist Taj Mahal and Texas bluesman Lightnin' Hopkins wrote and performed music that figured prominently in the critically acclaimed film Sounder (1972). The film earned Mahal a Grammy nomination for Best Original Score Written for a Motion Picture and a BAFTA nomination. Almost 30 years later, Mahal wrote blues for, and performed a banjo composition, claw-hammer style, in the 2001 movie release Songcatcher, which focused on the story of the preservation of the roots music of Appalachia.

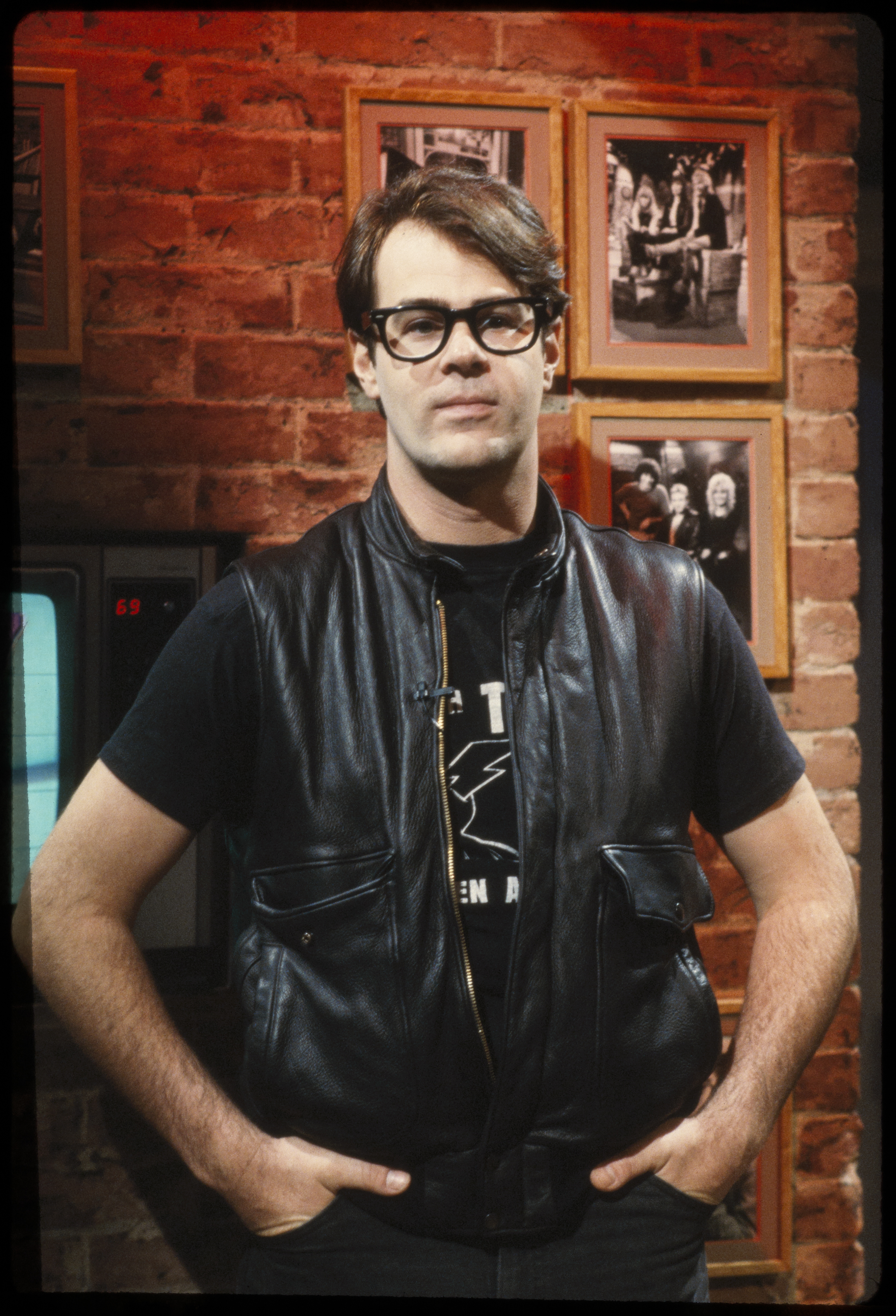
1982 photograph of Dan Aykroyd, writer and cast member of The Blues Brothers film.

Perhaps the most visible example of the blues style of music in the late 20th century came in 1980, when Dan Aykroyd and John Belushi released the film The Blues Brothers. The film drew many of the biggest living influencers of the rhythm and blues genre together, such as Ray Charles, James Brown, Cab Calloway, Aretha Franklin, and John Lee Hooker. The band formed also began a successful tour under the Blues Brothers marquee. 1998 brought a sequel, Blues Brothers 2000 that, while not holding as great a critical and financial success, featured a much larger number of blues artists, such as B.B. King, Bo Diddley, Erykah Badu, Eric Clapton, Steve Winwood, Charlie Musselwhite, Blues Traveler, Jimmie Vaughan, and Jeff Baxter.

In 2003, Martin Scorsese made significant efforts to promote the blues to a larger audience. He asked several famous directors, such as Clint Eastwood and Wim Wenders, to participate in a series of documentary films for PBS called The Blues. He also participated in the rendition of compilations of major blues artists in a series of high-quality CDs. Blues guitarist and vocalist Keb' Mo' performed his blues rendition of "America, the Beautiful" in 2006 to close out the final season of the television series The West Wing.

The blues was highlighted in season 2012, episode 1 of In Performance at the White House, entitled "Red, White and Blues". Hosted by Barack and Michelle Obama, the show featured performances by B. B. King, Buddy Guy, Gary Clark Jr., Jeff Beck, Derek Trucks, Keb Mo, and others.

A Jazzman's Blues by Tyler Perry (2022) is a film that provides a cinematic reflection of the blues, set in the background of the 1940s Deep South. The movie is based on a multi-generational plot of forbidden romance, family values, and issues of self-emancipation, all accompanied by blues music. The music is a mix of original pieces and traditional blues hits, with such performers as Ruth B., Joshua Boone, and Amirah Vann, and it captures the true emotional effect of the moment. The instrumental performance and arrangements make the audience feel the cultural and historical background of the blues with its development as a way of expression that has been created by suffering and survival. In addition to its music, the movie also focuses on the blues as a narration vehicle, the personal hardships of its characters attached to the social and racial processes of the American South in general. Perry was applauded by critics as presenting the blues as not a form of entertainment, but also a form of cultural as well as emotional expression that conveys messages of love, loss and survival across generations.

The 2025 vampire horror film Sinners explores the blues genre through a supernatural narrative placed in the 1930s Mississippi Delta. Director Ryan Coogler directs Sinners, which weaved together both African American musical traditions and Chinese cosmological mythology. This film reinvents the origins of the blues in a supernatural fashion during which rhythm, rituals, and myth are intertwined. This is shown when Monkey King, Sun Wukong is introduced. By combing both cultures into the film, it produces a cultural conversation between two different worlds where East and West fuse together, not in words but in music that breaks racial, historic and spiritual barriers. Through this, Sinners presents the blues not simply as a form of artistic expression born out of trails rather than a spiritual gateway that connects people, ancestry, and the spirit world. The film's soundtrack mixes original Delta blues with influences from Chinese music, creating a unique sound that reflects its cultural blend. Reviewers have noted that Sinners uses supernatural elements to explore themes of identity, resilience, and connection across cultures. By combining folklore, history, and myth, the story shows how music can link people to each other, their ancestors, and the spirit world. This approach has been praised for bringing a fresh perspective to both horror and musical storytelling.

== See also ==
- List of blues festivals
- List of blues musicians
- List of blues standards

== Bibliography ==
- Barlow, William (1993). "Cashing In: 1900–1939". In Dates, Jannette L.; Barlow, William (eds.). Split Image: African Americans in the Mass Media (2nd ed.). Howard University Press. p. 31. ISBN 978-0-88258-178-1.
- Bransford, Steve (2004). "Blues in the Lower Chattahoochee Valley" Southern Spaces.
- Clarke, Donald (1995). The Rise and Fall of Popular Music. St. Martin's Press. ISBN 978-0-312-11573-9.
- Lawrence Cohn, ed. (1993). Nothing but the Blues: The Music and the Musicians. Abbeville Publishing Group (Abbeville Press, Inc.). ISBN 978-1-55859-271-1.
- Curiel, Jonathan (August 15, 2004). "Muslim Roots of the Blues". SFGate. Archived from the original on September 5, 2005.
- Dicaire, David (1999). Blues Singers: Biographies of 50 Legendary Artists of the Early 20th Century. McFarland. ISBN 978-0-7864-0606-7.
- Ewen, David (1957). Panorama of American Popular Music. Prentice Hall. Reprint: ISBN 978-0-13-648360-1.
- Ferris, Jean (1993). America's Musical Landscape. Brown & Benchmark. ISBN 978-0-697-12516-3.
- Garofalo, Reebee (1997). Rockin' Out: Popular Music in the USA. Allyn & Bacon. ISBN 978-0-205-13703-9.
- Herzhaft, Gérard; Harris, Paul; Debord, Brigitte (1997). Encyclopedia of the Blues. University of Arkansas Press. ISBN 978-1-55728-452-5.
- Komara, Edward M. (2006). Encyclopedia of the Blues. Routledge. ISBN 978-0-415-92699-7.
- Kunzler, Martin (1988). Jazz Lexikon (in German). Rohwolt Taschenbuch Verlag. ISBN 978-3-499-16316-6.
- Morales, Ed (2003). The Latin Beat. Da Capo Press. ISBN 978-0-306-81018-3.
- Oliver, Paul; Wright, Richard (1990). Blues Fell This Morning: Meaning in the Blues. Cambridge University Press. ISBN 978-0-521-37793-5.
- Palmer, Robert (1981). Deep Blues. Viking. ISBN 978-0-670-49511-5.
- Schuller, Gunther (1968). Early Jazz: Its Roots and Musical Development. Oxford University Press. ISBN 978-0-19-504043-2.
- Southern, Eileen (1997). The Music of Black Americans. W. W. Norton. ISBN 978-0-393-03843-9.
