= Sumterville =

Sumterville may refer to:

- Sumterville, Alabama
- Sumterville, Florida
- Sumterville, South Carolina, now Sumter
