= Charles Anderson (vocalist) =

American entertainer

- Born: 1883; Snow Hill or Birmingham, Alabama, U.S.
- Died: after 1937; Pittsburgh, Pennsylvania, U.S.
- Occupations: Vaudeville entertainer, singer, female impersonator
- Years active: 1909-1928

Charles Anderson (1883 – after 1937) was an American vaudeville entertainer, singer and female impersonator, known as a pioneer performer of blues songs.

== Biography ==
Born in either Snow Hill or Birmingham, Alabama, Anderson was an active vaudeville performer by 1909, when he played in Memphis, Tennessee. He shared bills with Bessie Smith on several occasions, and by summer 1913 was known for his comedy and his performances of blues songs and "lullaby yodels", called by one reviewer "the Male Mockingbird". Anderson regularly performed as a female impersonator, in costume as an archetypal "mammy", and performed songs including "Baby Seals Blues" and W. C. Handy's "Saint Louis Blues". Ethel Waters, long regarded as the first performer of the latter song, stated that she had first heard it sung by Anderson in Baltimore in 1917. He also toured in Ontario, Michigan, and elsewhere.

In 1923, Anderson recorded Seals' blues for Okeh Records, as "Sing 'Em Blues", with piano accompaniment by Eddie Heywood Sr. Blues scholars Lynn Abbott and Doug Seroff commented on the performance: "Capturing the full range of Anderson's folk-operatic tenor voice in a remarkable rendition of the first published vocal blues song, this record survives to demonstrate an unabashedly comical resolution of "high" and "low" art, a positive realization of "colored folks opera." Anderson recorded a further six songs for Okeh in 1924, and at his final recording session in 1928 recorded "Saint Louis Blues" as well as "I Got Those Crying Yodelin' Blues."

Although a favorite with black vaudeville audiences at the time, Anderson has tended to be dismissed as a curiosity by later critics because of his high voice and clear diction, which Abbott and Seroff say "conflict with modern tastes and stereotypes."

Anderson is thought to have died in Pittsburgh, Pennsylvania, after 1937.
