= Blues ballad =

The term blues ballad is used to refer to a specific form of popular music which fused Anglo-American and Afro-American styles from the late 19th century onward. Early versions combined elements of the European influenced "native American ballad" with the forms of African American music. From the 20th century on it was also used to refer to a slow tempo, often sentimental song in a blues style.

== Structure and variations ==
The blues ballad often uses the Thirty-two-bar form of verse-verse-bridge-verse, in contrast to the 12-bar or 8-bar blues forms.

=== Popular blues ballads ===
The first blues ballads tended to deal with active protagonists, often anti-heroes, resisting adversity and authority, often in the context of industrialisation. They usually lacked the strong narrative common in European ballads, and emphasised instead individual character. They were often accompanied by banjo and guitar and often followed a standard 12-bar the blues format, with a repeated refrain in the last line of every verse. Blues ballads are usually anonymously authored and were performed by both black and white musicians in the early 20th century. Ballads about anti-heroes include "Wild Bill Jones", "Stagger Lee" and "John Hardy". The most famous blues ballads that deal with heroes in the context of industrialisation include those about John Henry and Casey Jones.

=== Blues ballads in other genres ===
From the late 19th century the term ballad began to be used for sentimental songs with their origins in the early ‘Tin Pan Alley’ music industry. As new genres of music, including the blues, began to emerge in the early 20th century the popularity of the genre faded, but the association with sentimentality meant led to this being used as the term for a slow love song from the 1950s onward.

Today the term is used to describe a song that uses a blues format with a slow tempo, often dealing with themes of love and affection. Examples include songs such as B. B. King's "Blues on the Bayou", Fats Domino's "Every Night About This Time", The blues ballad format is also popular in rock, jazz, and country music, such as Janis Joplin's version of "Cry Baby" and country singer Crystal Gayle's " Don't It Make My Brown Eyes Blue".
