= Dallas Blues =

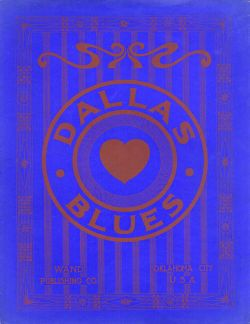
- Sheet music cover

Song
- Published: March 1912
- Genre: Blues
- Songwriter(s): Hart A. Wand

"Dallas Blues", written by Hart Wand, is an early blues song, first published in 1912. It has been called the first true blues tune ever published. However, two other 12-bar blues had been published earlier: Anthony Maggio's "I Got the Blues" in 1908 and "Oh, You Beautiful Doll", a Tin Pan Alley song whose first verse is twelve-bar blues, in 1911. Also, two other songs with "Blues" in their titles were published in 1912: "Baby Seals Blues" (August 1912), a vaudeville tune written by Baby Franklin Seals, and "The Memphis Blues", written by W.C. Handy (September 1912). Neither, however, were genuine blues songs.

The song, although written in standard blues tempo, is often performed in a ragtime or Dixieland style.

The blues was originally published as an instrumental for piano solo. In its original published version it consists of a single twenty-bar theme (a basic twelve-bar theme with a repeat of the final eight measures) presented twice, the second time in a elaborated ragtime form. A second edition of the song, also for piano solo, uses the same twenty-bar theme but precedes it with an independent twelve-bar melody. In 1918, a third version appeared, for voice and piano, with lyrics by Lloyd Garrett to express the singer's longing for Dallas:

There's a place I know, folks won't pass me by
Dallas, Texas, that's the town, I cry, oh hear me cry
And I'm going back, going back to stay there 'til I die, until I die

The song version uses the two themes of the second version, but reduces the eight-bar repeat on the second theme, so both are twelve-bar. It is mainly in this third form that the work has become known.

No date is found for the actual composition of "Dallas Blues" but Samuel Charters, who interviewed Wand for his book The Country Blues (1959), states that Wand took the tune to a piano-playing friend, Annabelle Robbins, who arranged the music for him. Charters added that the title came from one of Wand's father's workmen who remarked that the tune gave him the blues to go back to Dallas. Since Wand's father died in 1909, the actual composition must have predated that.

In any case, within weeks of its publication it was heard the length of the Mississippi River, and its influence on all the blues music that followed is well documented.

== Early recordings ==
Early recordings
Date	Artist	Label
1917	Marie Cahill	Victor 55081
1918	Wilbur Sweatman's Jazz Band	Columbia A-2663
1925	Fred Hall's Sugar Babies	Okeh 40437
1925	Lee Morse	Perfect 11582
1927	Bob Fuller	Brunswick 7006
1929	Louis Armstrong & His Orchestra	Okeh 8774
1930	Andy Kirk's 12 Clouds of Joy	Brunswick 6129
1931	Ted Lewis & His Band (v. Fats Waller)	Oriole 3132
1934	Isham Jones & His Orchestra	Victor 24649
1936	Wingy Manone & His Orchestra	Bluebird 6375A
1939	Woody Herman & His Orchestra	Decca 2629A

== Bibliography ==
- Charters, Samuel B. (1975). The Country Blues. Da Capo Press. ISBN 0-306-80014-4.
- Davis, Francis. (2003). The History of the Blues: The Roots, the Music, the People. Da Capo Press. ISBN 0-306-81296-7.
- Duncan, Craig (1994). Blues Fiddling Classics. Mel Bay Publications. ISBN 0-7866-1855-8.
- Jasen, David A. (2002). A Century of American Popular Music: 1899–1999. Routledge. ISBN 0-415-93700-0.
- Muir, Peter C. (2010). Long lost blues : popular blues in America, 1850-1920. Urbana: University of Illinois Press. ISBN 978-0-252-03487-9. OCLC 317462431.
- Wand, Hart A. (1912). "Dallas Blues". Wand Publishing. From Mississippi State University's Templeton Digital Sheet Music Collection.
- Wand, Hart A. (music); Garrett, Lloyd (words) (c. 1918). "Dallas Blues". Frank Root & Company. From the University of Colorado Digital Sheet Music Collection.
