= How Long, How Long Blues =

1928 blues song by Leroy Carr

Single by Leroy Carr
- B-side: "My Own Lonesome Blues"
- Released: 1928
- Recorded: Indianapolis, Indiana, June 19, 1928
- Genre: Blues
- Length: 3:03
- Label: Vocalion
- Songwriter: Leroy Carr

"How Long, How Long Blues" by Leroy Carr and Scrapper Blackwell

"How Long, How Long Blues" (also known as "How Long Blues" or "How Long How Long") is a blues song recorded by the American blues duo Leroy Carr and Scrapper Blackwell in 1928. It became an early blues standard and its melody inspired many later songs.

== Original song ==
"How Long, How Long Blues" is based on "How Long Daddy", recorded in 1925 by Ida Cox with Papa Charlie Jackson. On June 19, 1928, Leroy Carr, who sang and played piano, and guitarist Scrapper Blackwell recorded the song in Indianapolis, Indiana, for Vocalion Records, shortly after they began performing together. It is a moderately slow-tempo blues with an eight-bar structure. Carr is credited with the lyrics and music for the song, which uses a departed train as a metaphor for a lover who has left:

Heard the whistle blowin', couldn't see no train
Way down in my heart, I had an achin' pain
How long, how long, baby how long

Carr's and Blackwell's songs reflected a more urban and sophisticated blues, in contrast to the music of rural bluesmen of the time. Carr's blues were "expressive and evocative", although his vocals have also been described as emotionally detached, high-pitched and smooth, with clear diction.

"How Long, How Long Blues" was Carr and Blackwell's biggest hit. They subsequently recorded six more versions of the song (two of them, unissued at the time), as "How Long, How Long Blues, Part 2", "Part 3", "How Long Has That Evening Train Been Gone", "The New How Long, How Long Blues", etc. There are considerable variations in the lyrics, but most versions begin with the lyric "How long, how long, has that evening train been gone?"

== Legacy ==
"How Long, How Long Blues" became an early blues standard and "its lilting melody inspired hundreds of later compositions", including the Mississippi Sheiks' "Sitting on Top of the World" and Robert Johnson's "Come On in My Kitchen". Although his later style would not suggest it, Muddy Waters recalled that it was the first song he learned to play "off the Leroy Carr record".

In 1988, Carr's "How Long, How Long Blues" was inducted into the Blues Hall of Fame in the category "Classics of Blues Recordings – Singles or Album Tracks". Blues historian Jim O'Neal commented in the induction statement, "'How Long, How Long Blues' was a massive hit in the prewar blues era, a song that every blues singer and piano player had to know, and one that has continued to inspire dozens of cover versions." In 2012, the song received a Grammy Hall of Fame Award, which "honor[s] recordings of lasting qualitative or historical significance".

== See also ==
- List of train songs
