= Saint Louis Blues (song) =

1914 Song by W. C. Handy

"The Saint Louis Blues"
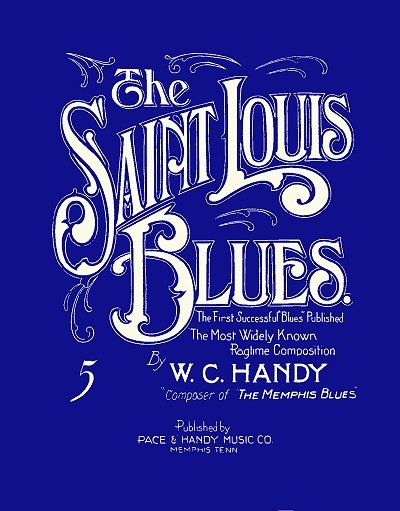
- Sheet music cover

Single by Bessie Smith with Louis Armstrong, cornet
- B-side: "Cold in Hand Blues"
- Published: September 11, 1914 by Pace & Handy Music Co.
- Released: April 10, 1925
- Recorded: January 14, 1925
- Genre: Jazz
- Length: 2:46
- Label: Columbia
- Songwriter: W. C. Handy

"The Saint Louis Blues" (or "St. Louis Blues") is a popular American song composed by W. C. Handy in the jazz style and published in September 1914. It was one of the first blues songs to succeed as a pop song and remains a fundamental part of jazz musicians' repertoire. Benny Goodman, Louis Armstrong, Cab Calloway, Bing Crosby, Bessie Smith, Mildred Bailey, Billy "Uke" Carpenter, Eartha Kitt, Count Basie, Glenn Miller, Guy Lombardo, Peanuts Hucko, Art Tatum, Paul Robeson, and the Boston Pops Orchestra (under the directions of both Arthur Fiedler and Keith Lockhart) are among the artists who have recorded it. The song has been called "the jazzman's Hamlet". Composer William Grant Still arranged a version of the song in 1916 while working with Handy.

The 1925 version sung by Bessie Smith, with Louis Armstrong on cornet, was inducted into the Grammy Hall of Fame in 1993. The 1929 version by Louis Armstrong & His Orchestra (with Red Allen) was inducted in 2008. The 1922 version by W.C. Handy and his Memphis Blues Band was selected by the Library of Congress for preservation in the National Recording Registry in 2023. In June 2026, CBS News included the song in its list of the 250 essential American songs of the past 250 years.

== History ==
Saint Louis Blues (1921)
The Original Dixieland Jass Band's 1921 recording of "Saint Louis Blues"

Saint Louis Blues (2013)
Tenor saxophone playing nine bars

Handy said he had been inspired by a chance meeting with a woman on the streets of St. Louis, Missouri, distraught over her husband's absence, who lamented, "Ma man's got a heart like a rock cast in de sea", a key line of the song. Handy's autobiography recounts his hearing the tune in St. Louis in 1892: "It had numerous one-line verses and they would sing it all night." (Note: The original published sheet music is available online from the United States Library of Congress in a searchable database of African-American music from Brown University.)

== Analysis ==
The form is unusual in that the verses are the now-familiar standard twelve-bar blues in common time with three lines of lyrics, the first two lines repeated, but it also has a 16-bar bridge written in the habanera rhythm, which Jelly Roll Morton called the "Spanish tinge" and characterized by Handy as tango.

While blues often became simple and repetitive in form, "Saint Louis Blues" has multiple complementary and contrasting strains, similar to classic ragtime compositions. Handy said his objective in writing the song was "to combine ragtime syncopation with a real melody in the spiritual tradition." T-Bone Walker commented about the song, "You can't dress up the blues ... I'm not saying that 'Saint Louis Blues' isn't fine music, you understand. But it just isn't blues".

== Performances ==
Handy wrote about the first time "Saint Louis Blues" was played in 1914:

The one-step and other dances had been done to the tempo of "Memphis Blues" ... When "St Louis Blues" was written the tango was in vogue. I tricked the dancers by arranging a tango introduction, breaking abruptly into a low-down blues. My eyes swept the floor anxiously, then suddenly I saw lightning strike. The dancers seemed electrified. Something within them came suddenly to life. An instinct that wanted so much to live, to fling its arms to spread joy, took them by the heels.

Singer and actress Ethel Waters was the first woman to sing "Saint Louis Blues" in public. She said she learned it from Charles Anderson and featured it herself during a 1917 engagement in Baltimore. The film St. Louis Blues, from 1929, featured Bessie Smith singing the song.

Singer and actress Theresa Harris sings "St. Louis Blues" in Baby Face and Banjo on My Knee both films starring Barbara Stanwyck.

In 1981, Tav Falco's Panther Burns recorded a version of "Saint Louis Blues" on their garage band blues rock album, Behind the Magnolia Curtain.

In 1998, "St. Louis Blues" was included on the album Gershwin's World by Herbie Hancock which featured Stevie Wonder on vocals. In 1999 at the 41st Annual Grammy Awards, this recording won two Grammys. Stevie Wonder won the Grammy for Best Male R&B Vocal Performance. In the Composing and Arranging category, Herbie Hancock, Robert Sadin and Stevie Wonder, arrangers (Herbie Hancock) won the Grammy for Best Instrumental Arrangement Accompanying Vocal(s).

In an NPR article dated August 10, 2011 titled "Evolution Of A Song: 'St. Louis Blues'" by Simon Rentner, the Gershwin - W.C. Handy connection is explained. "Composer George Gershwin borrowed W.C. Handy's themes for his own music, including for "Rhapsody in Blue," Gershwin's landmark work. Although the two musicians didn't know each other, Gershwin gave Handy a signed copy of his famous score with a note thanking Handy and acknowledging that his "early 'blues' songs are the forefathers of this work." Herbie Hancock and Stevie Wonder pay homage to Gershwin's admiration of Handy here" on Hancock's album, Gershwin's World.

== See also ==
- List of pre-1920 jazz standards
