= Sixteen-bar blues =

Musical chord progression genre

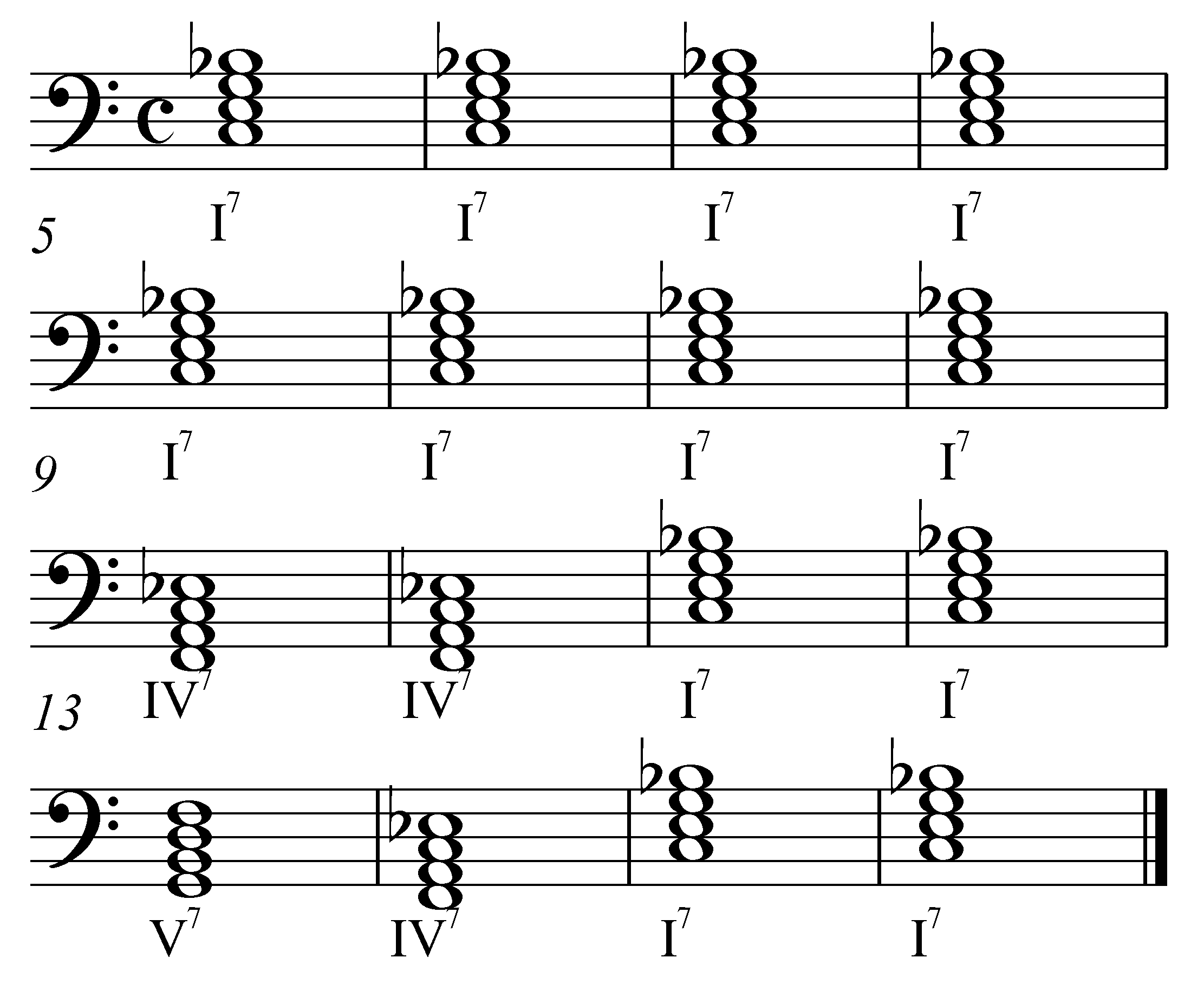

The sixteen-bar blues can be a variation on the standard twelve-bar blues or on the less common eight-bar blues. Sixteen-bar blues is also used commonly in ragtime music.

== Adaptation from twelve-bar progression ==
Most sixteen bar blues are adapted from a standard twelve-bar progression. The standard twelve-bar blues progression is

| I | I | I | I |
| IV | IV | I | I |
| V | V or IV | I | I |
Twelve bar boogie-woogie blues in C

where each cell in the table represents one measure (or "bar"), "I" represents the tonic chord, "IV" the subdominant chord, and "V" the dominant chord. Twelve-bar progressions are formed by applying one of several formulae, including the following.

One adaptation extends the first section of tonic chords (bars 1–4) by doubling or repeating to become the first half (bars 1–8) of the sixteen-bar progression,

| I | I | I | I |
| I | I | I | I |
| IV | IV | I | I |
| V | V or IV | I | I |

Examples include "I'm Your Hoochie Coochie Man", "Close to You", written by Willie Dixon and first performed by Muddy Waters, and "Oh, Pretty Woman", written by A.C. Williams and first recorded by Albert King (in this song, the instrumental sections are twelve bars).

Instead of extending the first section, one adaptation extends the third section. Here, the twelve-bar progression's last dominant, subdominant, and tonic chords (bars 9, 10, and 11–12, respectively) are doubled in length, becoming the sixteen-bar progression's 9th–10th, 11th–12th, and 13th–16th bars,

| I | I | I | I |
| IV | IV | I | I |
| V | V | V or IV | V or IV |
| I | I | I | I |

Examples include "Trigger Happy" by "Weird Al" Yankovic (the verse has this sixteen bar structure, with additional ornamentation and "turnaround" applied to tonic chord in bars 13–16).

Instead of extending the first or third section, one might repeat the second section. In this version, the twelve-bar middle section (subdominant on bars 5–6, tonic on 7–8) is repeated, often along with its lyrical-melodic material:

| I | I | I | I |
| IV | IV | I | I |
| IV | IV | I | I |
| V | V or IV | I | I |

Examples include most renditions of "Going Down the Road Feeling Bad", also known as "Lonesome Road Blues", including those by Henry Whitter, the Blue Ridge Duo (George Reneau and Gene Austin) and Woody Guthrie; and "Sleepy Time Time" by Cream.

In a further repeating variation, the transition from the ninth (dominant) to tenth (subdominant) twelve-bar chord is repeated twice,

| I | I | I | I |
| IV | IV | I | I |
| V | V or IV | V | V or IV |
| V | V or IV | I | I |
Sixteen bar boogie-woogie blues in C

This can be heard, for example, in "Watermelon Man" by Herbie Hancock.

In a final style, the transition from ninth (dominant) to tenth (subdominant) twelve-bar chord is repeated once and the last tonic chord bars are doubled in length,

| I | I | I | I |
| IV | IV | I | I |
| V | IV | V | IV |
| V | IV | I | I |

Bars 9 and 10 are repeated three times with a hard stop at the beginning of the third bar 10 (Or the actual 14th bar).

Examples include "Let's Dance," written by Jim Lee, first performed by Chris Montez, and covered by bands including the Ramones.

== Adaptation from eight-bar progression ==
Alternatively, a sixteen bar blues can be adapted from a standard eight bar blues by repeating each measure of the eight-bar progression and playing the result at double speed (doppio movimento).

== See also ==
- Eight-bar blues
- Thirty-two bar form
- Blues ballad
- Talking blues
- '50s progression, another chord progression widespread in Western popular music
