= Rich Brown (blues musician) =

American blues musician

Uncle Rich Brown
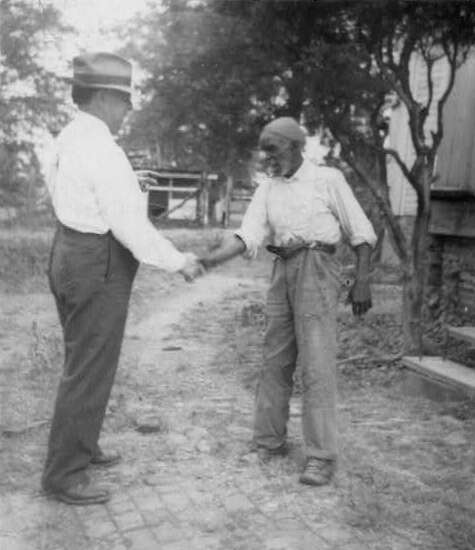
- John Lomax and Brown shaking hands in Sumterville, Alabama, in 1940

Background information
- Birth name: Richard Brown
- Also known as: "Uncle"
- Born: Alabama, U.S.
- Genres: Blues
- Occupation: Singer

Richard Brown, also known as Uncle Rich Brown, was an American musician and singer of spirituals and blues. He lived on one plantation near Sumterville, Alabama, all his life. John Lomax recorded him in 1937 and 1940 singing eleven songs, most of them spirituals. One of his most popular recordings was "Alabama Bound".
