= List of blues music genres =

This is a list of Blues music genres.

- African blues
- Anatolian blues
- Blues rock
  - Biker metal
  - Punk blues
- Boogie-Woogie
- British blues
- Canadian blues
- Chicago blues
- Classic female blues
- Country blues
- Delta blues
- Desert blues
- Detroit blues
- Electric blues
- Hill country blues
- Hokum blues
- Jump blues
- Kansas City blues
- Louisiana blues
- Memphis blues
- New Orleans blues
- New Zealand blues
- Piedmont blues
- St. Louis blues
- Swamp blues
- Talking blues
- Texas blues
- West Coast blues
