= Blues Fell This Morning =

Book by Paul Oliver

- First edition
- Author: Paul Oliver
- Language: English
- Publisher: Cassell
- Publication date: 1960

Blues Fell This Morning is a notable 1960 book published by Cassell and written by Paul Oliver. The book follows Olivers' educational insight into the blues, as well as American folk music between the 1920s and the 1950s. The book provides insights into problematic periods during this time; such as relationships, the depression years etc.

In his The Rolling Stones: How, Why and Where It All Began, Alan Clayson sources the 1st edition of Oliver's Blues Fell This Morning as a work popular with a young Mick Jagger and his classmates as they learned the language and the lore of the blues. "Changing hands for weeks among them had been someone's copy of Paul Oliver's Blues Fell This Morning, hot off the press and to be recognized later as a standard work." Clayson notes the popularity of Oliver's 1960 book in the year just prior to the historic encounter between Mick Jagger and Keith Richards at Dartford's train station bringing the two former schoolmates together in their shared love of the blues and of rock and roll. "The Dartford blues disciples turned to [Blues Fell This Morning] as monks to the Bible, working their way through as much of its bibliography as could be ordered from the public library, and fanning out to erudite tomes concerning, say, plantation field hollers and the African roots of blues," Clayson writes in his 2007 work.

A paperback edition was published in 1990.
