= Lists of blues musicians =

This article contains lists of blues musicians by their respective genres and styles.

- List of blues musicians
- List of boogie woogie musicians
- List of British blues musicians
- List of Chicago blues musicians
- List of classic female blues singers
- List of country blues musicians
- List of Delta blues musicians
- List of electric blues musicians
- List of gospel blues musicians
- List of jump blues musicians
- List of Piedmont blues musicians
- List of soul-blues musicians
- List of Texas blues musicians
- List of West Coast blues musicians
