= Hart Wand =

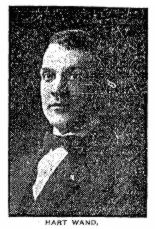

Background information
- Also known as: Hart A. Wand.
- Born: Hart Ancker Wand; March 3, 1887; Topeka, Kansas, U.S.
- Died: August 9, 1960 (aged 73) New Orleans, Louisiana, U.S.
- Genres: Fiddle band
- Occupation(s): Musician, Bandleader
- Instrument: Fiddle
- Years active: 1900s-1910s

Hart Ancker Wand (March 3, 1887 – August 9, 1960), was an American early fiddler and bandleader from Oklahoma City, Oklahoma. He was of German extraction. In the musical world he is chiefly noted for publishing the "Dallas Blues" in March 1912 (copyrighted in September). "Dallas Blues" was an early example of published twelve-bar blues song.

Little is known about Wand. He was named for his maternal grandfather, Hart P. Ancker. Wand was an 89er, coming with his parents, a brother, and two sisters from Kansas at age two. His father John, an immigrant from Frankfurt, Germany, and successful druggist in Topeka, immediately after the run set up a tent drugstore in what would become Oklahoma City. After his father's death in 1909, Hart Wand took control of the Wand & Son manufacturing plant in Oklahoma City, and kept up his musical interests. Wand moved his business to Chicago sometime before 1920, and by 1920 had settled in New Orleans. He traveled through Europe, Latin America, and Asia for his business. Samuel Charters, who interviewed Wand for his book The Country Blues (1959), stated that Wand was respected and well liked in New Orleans. Wand's wife, Alberta, died in 1982.

== Bibliography ==
- Charters, Samuel B. The Country Blues. Da Capo Press, 1975. ISBN 0-306-80014-4
- Davis, Francis. The History Of The Blues: The Roots, The Music, The People. Da Capo Press, 2003. ISBN 0-306-81296-7
- Duncan, Craig. Blues Fiddling Classics. Mel Bay Publications, 1994. ISBN 0-7866-1855-8
