= Baby Franklin Seals =

American singer

Background information
- Born: H. Franklin Seals c. 1880; Mobile, Alabama, U.S.
- Died: December 29, 1915 (aged 35) Anniston, Alabama, U.S.
- Genres: Vaudeville, blues
- Occupations: Entertainer, comedian, singer, songwriter
- Instrument: Piano
- Years active: 1909–1915

H. Franklin "Baby" Seals (c. 1880 – December 29, 1915) was an American vaudeville performer, songwriter and pianist, whose successful 1912 song "Baby Seals' Blues" was one of the first published blues compositions, predating W. C. Handy's "The Memphis Blues" by several months.

== Biography ==
An African-American, Seals was born in Mobile, Alabama, around 1880. He first came to public attention in 1909 as the pianist at the Lyric Theatre in Shreveport, Louisiana. In 1910 his ragtime "coon song" "Shake, Rattle & Roll" (unrelated, except in title, to the later song by Jesse Stone) was published by Louis Grunewald & Co. in New Orleans. The same year, he directed and performed in shows in Houston and Galveston, Texas, where he partnered "Baby" Floyd Fisher, described as a "dainty little singing and dancing soubrette". Seals and Fisher were married, performed together as a duo, and in 1911 appeared in shows in New York, Chicago and Philadelphia, demonstrating their wide appeal.

"Baby Seals' Blues" was published in St. Louis, Missouri in August 1912, with words and music credited to Baby F. Seals, and stating that it was featured by Seals and Fisher, "that Klassy Kooney Komedy Pair". The sheet music stipulated that it was to be played "very slow". The lyrics are similar to those in later recorded blues: "I got the blues, can't be satisfied today/ I got them bad, want to lay down and die/ Woke up this morning 'bout half past four/ Somebody knocking at my door/ I went out to see what it was about / They told me that my honey gal was gone/ I said, bub that's bad news/ So sing for me them blues."

The song was arranged by Artie Matthews, and seems to have sold well. It rapidly entered the repertoire of other vaudeville performers, including both Jelly Roll Morton and the yodeler Charles Anderson, who recorded the tune in 1923 as "Sing 'Em Blues". By late 1912, the tune had also been arranged for performance by bands, and by 1913 Seals was being noted as a "famous blues writer". It was widely advertised in the Indianapolis Freeman, with whom Seals regularly corresponded, establishing himself as a spokesman for Southern performers.

During 1912, Seals and Fisher performed regularly in Nashville, before a series of engagements in Jacksonville, Mobile, Louisville and Birmingham. They performed with S. H. Dudley's company along the east coast and in Harlem, but by 1915 Seals was working as a solo act. He died in Anniston, Alabama, in December 1915, of unknown causes.
