= Eight-bar blues =

Common chord progression

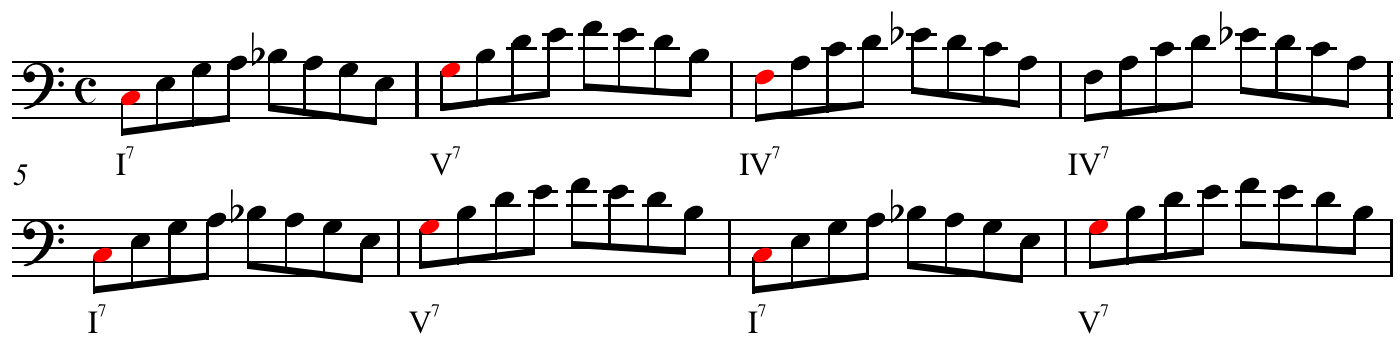
- One boogie woogie bassline for 8-bar blues progression in C, chord roots in red.
- Eight-bar boogie-woogie blues in C

In music, an eight-bar blues is a common blues chord progression. Music writers have described it as "the second most common blues form" being "common to folk, rock, and jazz forms of the blues". It is often notated in 4/4 or 12/8 time with eight bars to the verse.

== Overview ==
Early examples of eight-bar blues standards include:

- "Ain't Nobody's Business If I Do" (Sara Martin, 1922)
- "Trouble in Mind" (Bertha Hill, 1926)
- "How Long Blues" (Leroy Carr, 1928)
- "Nobody Knows You When You're Down and Out" (Bessie Smith, 1929)
- "It Hurts Me Too" (Tampa Red, 1940)
- "Key to the Highway" (Big Bill Broonzy, 1941)
- "Worried Life Blues" (Big Maceo, 1941)

One variant using this progression is to couple one eight-bar blues melody with a different eight-bar blues bridge to create a blues variant of the standard 32-bar song: "I Want a Little Girl" (T-Bone Walker) and "Great Balls of Fire" (Jerry Lee Lewis)

Eight-bar blues progressions have more variations than the more rigidly defined twelve bar format. The move to the IV chord usually happens at bar 3 (as opposed to 5 in twelve bar); however, "the I chord moving to the V chord right away, in the second measure, is a characteristic of the eight-bar blues."

In the following examples each box represents a 'bar' of music (the specific time signature is not relevant). The chord in the box is played for the full bar. If two chords are in the box they are each played for half a bar, etc. The chords are represented as scale degrees in Roman numeral analysis. Roman numerals are used so the musician may understand the progression of the chords regardless of the key it is played in.

"Eight-bar blues chord progression":

I	V^{7}	IV^{7}	IV^{7}
I	V^{7} IV^{7}	I	V^{7}

Eight-bar blues chord progression in C

"Worried Life Blues" (probably the most common eight-bar blues progression):

I	I	IV	IV
I	V	I IV	I V

Eight-bar blues progression in C

"Heartbreak Hotel" (variation with the I on the first half):

I	I	I	I
IV	IV	V	I

J. B. Lenoir's "Slow Down" and "Key to the Highway" (variation with the V at bar 2):

I^{7}	V^{7}	IV^{7}	IV^{7}
I^{7}	V^{7}	I^{7}	V^{7}

"Get a Haircut" by George Thorogood (simple progression):

I	I	I	I
IV	IV	V	V

Jimmy Rogers' "Walkin' By Myself" (somewhat unorthodox example of the form):

I^{7}	I^{7}	I^{7}	I^{7}
IV^{7}	V^{7}	I^{7}	V^{7}

Howlin Wolf's version of "Sitting on Top of the World" is actually a 9 bar blues that adds an extra "V" chord at the end of the progression. The song uses movement between major and dominant 7th and major and minor fourth:

I	I^{7}	IV	iv
I^{7}	V	I^{7} IV	I^{7} V

The first four bar progression used by Wolf is also used in Nina Simone's 1965 version of "Trouble in Mind", but with a more uptempo beat than "Sitting on Top of the World":

I	I^{7}	IV	iv
I VI^{7}	ii V	I IV	I V

The progression may be created by dropping the first four bars from the twelve-bar blues, as in the solo section of Bonnie Raitt's "Love Me Like a Man" and Buddy Guy's "Mary Had a Little Lamb":

IV^{7}	IV^{7}	I^{7}	I^{7}
V^{7}	IV^{7}	I^{7}	V^{7}

There are at least a few very successful songs using somewhat unusual chord progressions as well. For example, the song "Ain't Nobody's Business" as performed by Freddie King at least, uses a I–III–IV–iv progression in each of the first four bars. The same four bar progression is used by the band Radiohead to make up the bulk of the song "Creep".

I	III	IV	iv
I	vi	ii	V^{7}

The same chord progression can also be called a sixteen-bar blues, if each symbol above is taken to be a half note in 2/2 or 4/4 time. Examples are "Nine Pound Hammer" and Ray Charles's original instrumental "Sweet Sixteen Bars".

== See also ==
- Twelve-bar blues
- Sixteen-bar blues
- Thirty-two bar form
