= Sumterville, Alabama =

Unincorporated community in Alabama, United States

- Unincorporated community
- Location within the state of Alabama Sumterville, Alabama (the United States)
- Coordinates: 32°42′42″N 88°14′20″W
- Country: United States
- State: Alabama
- County: Sumter
- Elevation: 300 ft (90 m)
- Time zone: UTC-6 (Central (CST))
  - Summer (DST): UTC-5 (CDT)
- Area codes: 205, 659
- GNIS feature ID: 153610

Sumterville is an unincorporated community in Sumter County, Alabama, United States.

== History ==
Sumterville was originally known as Pattons Hill in honor of James W. Patton, who owned the surrounding land. The name was then changed to Sumterville in 1834. At one point, Sumterville was home to an inn, a boys and girls academy, several churches, a dentist, and a drugstore. A post office operated under the name Sumterville from 1836 to 1973.

John Lomax recorded blues musician Rich Brown performing ten of his songs in Sumterville in 1940.
