= Twelve-bar blues =

Prominent chord progression in popular music

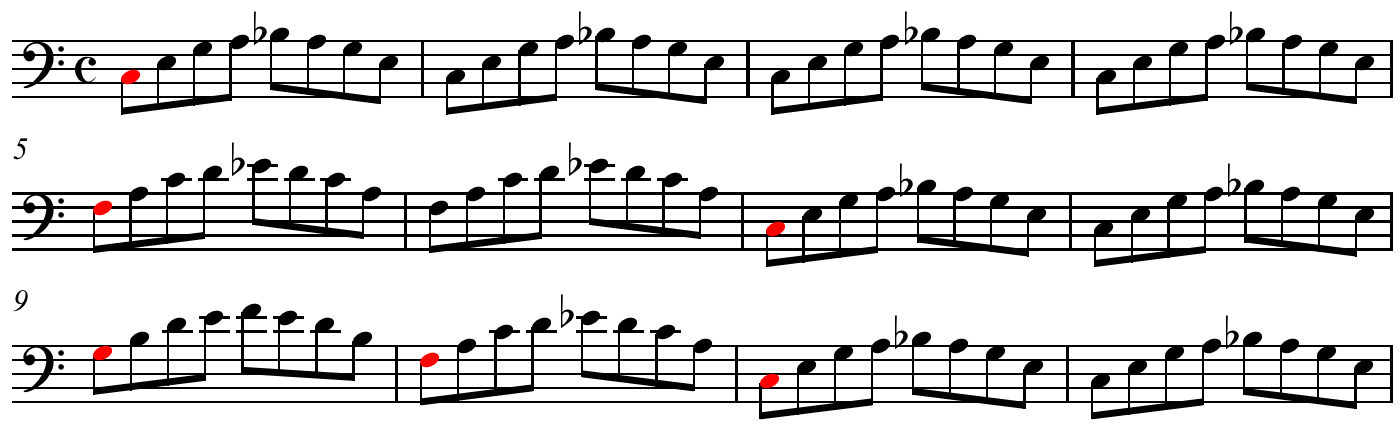
- Typical boogie woogie bassline on twelve-bar blues progression in C, chord roots in red
- Twelve bar boogie-woogie blues in C

The twelve-bar blues (or blues changes) is one of the most prominent chord progressions in popular music. The blues progression has a distinctive form in lyrics, phrase, chord structure, and duration. In its basic form, it is predominantly based on the I, IV, and V chords of a key.

== Background ==
The blues originated from a combination of work songs, spirituals, and early southern country music. The music was passed down through oral tradition. It was first written down by W. C. Handy, an African American composer and band leader. Its popularity led to the creation of "race records" and the popularity of blues singers like Bessie Smith and Ma Rainey. The style of music heard on race records was later called "rhythm and blues" (R & B). As the music became more popular, more people wanted to perform it. General patterns that existed in the blues were formalized, one of these being the 12-bar blues.

== Basic progression ==
The basic progression for a 12-bar blues may be represented in several ways. It is shown in its simplest form, without the common "quick change", turnarounds, or seventh chords. For variations, see the following section.

- Chord notation in the key of C:

C	C	C	C
F	F	C	C
G	F	C	G

- Functional notation – chords are represented by T to indicate the tonic, S for the subdominant, and D for the dominant:

T	T	T	T
S	S	T	T
D	S	T	D

- Roman numeral notation – I represents the tonic, IV the sub-dominant, and V the dominant:

I	I	I	I
IV	IV	I	I
V	IV	I	V

== Variations ==
=== Shuffle blues ===
In the original form, the dominant chord was repeated on the twelfth bar; later on, the V–IV–I–I "shuffle blues" pattern became standard in the third set of four bars:

I	I	I	I
IV	IV	I	I
V	IV	I	I

Twelve bar boogie-woogie blues in C

=== Quick to four ===
The common quick-change, quick to four, or quick four variation uses the subdominant or IV chord in the second bar.

I	IV	I	I
IV	IV	I	I
V	IV	I	I

=== Seventh chords ===
Seventh chords are a type of chord that includes the 7th scale degree (that is, the 7th note of the scale). There are different types of 7th chords such as major 7ths, dominant 7ths, minor 7ths, half diminished 7ths, and fully diminished 7ths. These chords are similar with slight changes, but are all centered around the same key center. Dominant 7th chords are generally used throughout a blues progression. The addition of dominant 7th chords as well as the inclusion of other types of 7th chords (i.e. minor and diminished 7ths) are often used just before a change, and more changes can be added. A more complicated example might look like this, where "7" indicates a seventh chord:

I	IV	I	I^{7}
IV	IV^{7}	I	I^{7}
V	IV	I	V^{7}

=== Bebop blues ===
This progression is similar to Charlie Parker's "Now's the Time", "Billie's Bounce", Sonny Rollins's "Tenor Madness", and many other bop tunes. Peter Spitzer describes it as "a bop soloist's cliche to arpeggiate this chord [A^{7♭9} (V/ii = VI^{7♭9})] from the 3 up to the ♭9."

I^{7}	IV^{7}	I^{7}	V^{7} I^{7}
IV^{7}	♯IV^{o}^{7}	I^{7}	V/ii^{♭9}
ii^{7}	V^{7}	I^{7} V/ii^{♭9}	ii^{7} V^{7}

Bebop blues progression

=== Minor blues ===
There are also minor twelve-bar blues, such as John Coltrane's "Equinox" and "Mr. P.C.". The chord on the fifth scale degree may be major (V^{7}) or minor (v^{7}). Major and minor can also be mixed together, a signature characteristic of the music of Charles Brown.

i^{7}	i^{7}	i^{7}	i^{7}
iv^{7}	iv^{7}	i^{7}	i^{7}
♭VI^{7}	V^{7}	i^{7}	i^{7}

Minor blues progression

=== Other variations ===
"W. C. Handy codified this blues form to help musicians communicate chord changes." Many variations are possible. The length of sections may be varied to create eight-bar blues or sixteen-bar blues.

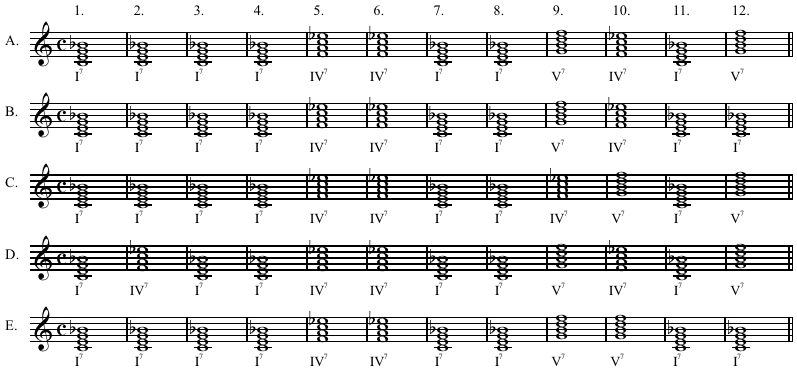
Standard twelve-bar blues progressions variations, in key of C., B, C, D, and E as boogie woogie basslines.

== Melodic line ==
As the chords of a 12-bar blues follow a form, so does the melodic line. The melodic line might just be the melody of the piece or it might also include lyrics. The melody and lyrics frequently follow an AA'B form, meaning one phrase is played then repeated (perhaps with a slight alteration), then something new is played. This pattern is frequently used in the blues and in musical genres that have their roots in the blues.

== See also ==
- Eight-bar blues
- Sixteen-bar blues
- Bird changes

== Sources ==
- Benward, Bruce; Saker, Marilyn Nadine (2003). Music: In Theory and Practice, Vol. I (7th ed.). McGraw-Hill. ISBN 978-0-07-294262-0.
- Covach, John (2005). "Form in Rock Music: A Primer". In Stein, Deborah (ed.). Engaging Music: Essays in Music Analysis. Oxford University Press. ISBN 0-19-517010-5.
- di Perna, Alan (1991). "Jazzin' the Blues with Charles Brown". Musician, issues 147–152. Amordian Press.
- Gerow, Maurice; Tanner, Paul (1984). A Study of Jazz. William C. Brown. ISBN 978-0-07-294262-0. "Cited in Baker, Robert M. (2005)"
- Gridley, Mark C. (2000). Jazz Styles: Jazz Classics Compact Disc. Sony Music. ISBN 0-13-012693-4.
- Jackson, Fruteland (2002). Beginning Delta Blues Guitar. Alfred Publishing. ISBN 978-0-7390-3006-6.
- Kernfeld, Barry, ed. (2007). "Blues progression". The New Grove Dictionary of Jazz. Vol. 2. Oxford University Press.
- McCumber, Dennis (2006). The Total Blues Guitarist. Alfred Publishing. ISBN 9780739038499.
- Middleton, Richard (1990). Studying Popular Music. Open University Press. ISBN 0-335-15275-9.
- Spitzer, Peter (2001). Jazz Theory Handbook. Mel Bay. ISBN 978-0-7866-5328-7.
- Thomas, John (2002). Voice Leading for Guitar: Moving Through the Changes. Berklee Press. ISBN 0-634-01655-5.
- van der Merwe, Peter (1989). Origins of the Popular Style. Clarendon Press. ISBN 0-19-316121-4. "Cited in Middleton (1990)"
