= Ellington Indigos =

- Photo: Roy DeCarava

Studio album by Duke Ellington
- Released: 1958
- Recorded: March 13, September 9 – October 14, 1957
- Genre: Jazz
- Length: 44:36
- Label: Columbia
- Producer: Irving Townsend

Duke Ellington chronology
Ella Fitzgerald Sings the Duke Ellington Songbook (1957)	Ellington Indigos (1958)	Black, Brown and Beige (1958)

Ellington Indigos (reissue)
- A CD reissue cover.

Ellington Indigos is a 1958 jazz album by Duke Ellington.

The stereo CD reissue released by Columbia (CK 4444) in 1987 contains a track listing and cover art that is drastically different from the original mono LP. A change in song order and two additional songs – "Night and Day" and "All The Things You Are" – were added to the CD, while "The Sky Fell Down" was omitted.

Professional ratings
Review scores
Source	Rating
AllMusic	2/5 stars
The Penguin Guide to Jazz Recordings	2.5/4 stars
The Rolling Stone Jazz Record Guide	3/5 stars

== LP (Columbia CL1085) ==
Side one
No.	Title	Writer(s)	Recording date	Length
1.	"Solitude" (Soloist: Duke Ellington on piano)	Duke Ellington	October 14, 1957	4:43
2.	"Where or When" (Soloist: Paul Gonsalves on tenor saxophone)	Richard Rodgers	October 10, 1957	4:02
3.	"Mood Indigo" (Soloist: Shorty Baker on trumpet)	Duke Ellington/Barney Bigard	September 9, 1957	3:07
4.	"Autumn Leaves" (Vocalist: Ozzie Bailey. Soloist: Ray Nance on violin)	Joseph Kosma, Jacques Prévert/Johnny Mercer (lyrics)	October 1, 1957	7:10
Total length:				19:02

Side two
No.	Title	Writer(s)	Recording date	Length
1.	"Prelude to a Kiss" (Soloist: Johnny Hodges on alto saxophone)	Duke Ellington	October 1, 1957	4:44
2.	"Willow Weep for Me" (Soloist: Shorty Baker on trumpet)	Ann Ronell	October 10, 1957	4:15
3.	"Tenderly" (Soloist: Jimmy Hamilton on clarinet)	Walter Gross	September 9, 1957	5:23
4.	"Dancing in the Dark" (Soloist: Harry Carney on baritone saxophone)	Arthur Schwartz	October 1, 1957	4:28
Total length:				18:50 37:52

== CD (Columbia COL 4723642) ==
No.	Title	Writer(s)	Recording date	Length
1.	"Solitude"
2.	"Where or When"
3.	"Mood Indigo"
4.	"Night and Day" (Soloist: Paul Gonsalves on tenor saxophone)	Cole Porter	October 10, 1957	2:54
5.	"Prelude to a Kiss"
6.	"All the Things You Are" (Soloist: Duke Ellington on piano)	Jerome Kern	October 10, 1957	3:50
7.	"Willow Weep for Me"
8.	"Tenderly"
9.	"Dancing in the Dark"
10.	"Autumn Leaves"
11.	"The Sky Fell Down"

== Alternate versions ==
The original mono (CL 1085) and stereo (CS 8053) LP issues contained some different takes between them on various tracks, "Willow Weep for Me" being one of them.

The CD (CBS 463342 2) liner notes say that "All The Things You Are and "Night and Day" were previously unreleased versions and that "Autumn Leaves" was an alternate take. Analyzing the two versions of "Autumn Leaves" shows that they are identical; however, the LP has Ozzie Bailey's first vocal chorus (a French one) edited out. (There is indeed an alternate version of "Autumn Leaves" recorded September 9, 1957, available on Duke Ellington & His Great Vocalists [Columbia CK 66372]). The stereo versions of "Mood Indigo" and "Willow Weep for Me" are different from their mono counterparts.

There are a multitude of versions of this album in circulation. For instance, there is another mono take of "Mood Indigo" available on the LP (CBS 88653 side 2, track 6).

=== Listing ===
- LP: Columbia CL 1085 (mono – 9 tracks – original album)
- LP: Columbia CS 8053 (stereo – 8 tracks – no "The Sky Fell Down")
- LP: CBS 88653 (stereo – 8 tracks – no "The Sky Fell Down")
- CD: Columbia CK 4444 (stereo – 10 tracks – no "The Sky Fell Down")
- CD: CBS 463342 2 (stereo – 10 tracks – no "The Sky Fell Down")
- CD: Columbia COL 4723642 (stereo – 11 tracks – French)
- CD: Columbia Legacy 886979 388826 (stereo - 15 tracks - part of 9xCD box set "The Complete Columbia Studio Albums Collection 1951-1958")

== Personnel ==
Performance

- Johnny Hodges, Rick Henderson – alto saxophone
- Jimmy Hamilton, Russell Procope – clarinet, alto saxophone
- Paul Gonsalves – tenor saxophone
- Harry Carney – baritone saxophone
- Cat Anderson, Shorty Baker, Willie Cook, Clark Terry – trumpet
- Ray Nance – trumpet, violin
- Quentin Jackson, Britt Woodman – trombone
- John Sanders – bass trombone
- Duke Ellington – piano
- Jimmy Woode – bass
- Sam Woodyard – drums
- Ozzie Bailey – vocals

Credits

- Irving Townsend – producer
- Stanley Dance – liner notes
- Allen Weinberg – artwork, cover design
- David Gahr – photography
- Michael Brooks – digital producer
- Larry Keyes – remixing
- Mike Berniker, Amy Herot – production, Jazz masterpieces series coordinators
