= Studio Sessions, Chicago 1956 =

Studio album by Duke Ellington
- Released: 1987
- Recorded: January 3, March 18–19, 1956; late January and February 1957
- Genre: Jazz
- Label: LMR

Duke Ellington chronology
A Drum Is a Woman (1956)	Studio Sessions, Chicago 1956 (1987)	Such Sweet Thunder (1957)

Studio Sessions, Chicago 1956 is the first volume of The Private Collection, a series documenting recordings made by the American pianist, composer and bandleader Duke Ellington for his personal collection which was first released on the LMR label in 1987 and later on the Saja label.

== Reception ==
Professional ratings
Review scores
Source	Rating
AllMusic	3/5 stars
The Penguin Guide to Jazz	4/4 stars
The Rolling Stone Jazz & Blues Album Guide	4/5 stars

The AllMusic review by Scott Yanow stated, "Each of the sets has its interesting moments, offering previously unknown compositions and performances".

Writing for The Washington Post, Leonard Feather commented: "One need only listen to the first couple of cuts to be reminded that Ellington's was the greatest jazz orchestra ever, particularly during the years 1939–1970. The clarity of sound is amazing on this prestereo volume."

== Track listing ==
All compositions by Duke Ellington except as indicated.

1. "March 19th Blues" (Ellington, Irving Mills) – 5:27
2. "Feet Bone" – 2:42
3. "In a Sentimental Mood" (Ellington, Manny Kurtz, Mills) – 3:05
4. "Discontented" – 3:02
5. "Jump for Joy" (Ellington, Sid Kuller, Paul Francis Webster) – 1:52
6. "Just Scratchin' the Surface" – 3:05
7. "Prelude to a Kiss" (Ellington, Irving Gordon, Mills) – 3:29
8. "Miss Lucy" – 3:16
9. "Uncontrived" – 5:12
10. "Satin Doll" (Ellington, Johnny Mercer, Billy Strayhorn) – 2:34
11. "Do Not Disturb" – 2:46
12. "Love You Madly" – 3:21
13. "Short Sheet Cluster" – 2:35
14. "Moon Mist" – 3:27
15. "Long Time Blues" – 8:39

Recorded at Universal Studios, Chicago, on January 3, 1956 (tracks 2, 4, 6, 11 & 15); March 18, 1956 (tracks 9 & 13); March 19, 1956 (tracks 1, 7 & 8); late January 1957 (track 3); and February 1957 (tracks 5, 10, 12 & 14).

== Personnel ==
- Duke Ellington – piano
- Cat Anderson, Willie Cook, Ray Nance, Clark Terry – trumpet
- Quentin Jackson, Britt Woodman – trombone
- John Sanders – valve trombone
- Jimmy Hamilton – clarinet, tenor saxophone
- Johnny Hodges – alto saxophone
- Russell Procope – alto saxophone, clarinet
- Paul Gonsalves – tenor saxophone
- Harry Carney – baritone saxophone
- Jimmy Woode – double bass
- Sam Woodyard – drums
