= A Drum Is a Woman =

Studio album by Duke Ellington
- Released: 1957
- Recorded: September 17, 24, 25 & 28, October 23 and December 6, 1956
- Genre: Jazz
- Label: Columbia

Duke Ellington chronology
Ellington at Newport (1956)	A Drum Is a Woman (1957)	Studio Sessions, Chicago 1956 (1987)

Professional ratings
Review scores
Source	Rating
AllMusic	2/5 stars
DownBeat	5 stars
The Penguin Guide to Jazz Recordings	3/4 stars
The Rolling Stone Jazz Record Guide	3/5 stars

A Drum Is a Woman is a musical allegory by American pianist, composer, and bandleader Duke Ellington and his long-time musical collaborator Billy Strayhorn. It tells the story of Madam Zajj, the personification of African rhythm, and Carribee Joe, who has his roots firmly in the jungle with his drums. Zajj travels out into the world seeking fame and sophistication and melds with the influences of cultures she weaves through the story, which gives a brief history of the rise of jazz and bebop.

Originally recorded for the Columbia label in 1956, it was produced for television on the US Steel hour on May 8, 1957. The album was re-released on CD in 2004 with a bonus track. A stage performance was produced by Marc Stager June 24, 1988, at Symphony Space in New York City with pianist and arranger Chris Cherney leading the orchestra and Duke's son Mercer Ellington narrating.

== Reception ==
Jack Tracy stated in his five-star DownBeat review:

"A Drum is a Woman is the most ambitious project attempted by Duke Ellington in years. It is a capsule history of jazz, it is a history of the Negro in America, it is a history of the Ellington orchestra, and it is a folk opera... But more than any of these it is a revealing self-portrait of Duke Ellington."

The New York Times reviewer John S. Wilson commented on the 1988 performance:

Unlike other extended Ellington works, which are primarily if not entirely instrumental, "A Drum Is a Woman" is developed through songs and a narration with only occasional full orchestral passages. It was powerful, rhythmic and kaleidoscopic, with a strong vocal anchor at Friday's performance in Claudia Hamilton, a commanding presence as Madam Zajj. Luke Dogen's Carabea [sic] Joe was a genial, good-time companion with a strong inner core that emerged in a positively stated love song, "You Better Know It."

The AllMusic review by Scott Yanow stated: "Dominated by vocals and narration, the music often plays a backseat to the story, which is worth hearing twice at the most".

== Track listing ==
All tracks are written by Duke Ellington and Billy Strayhorn.

No.	Title	Length
1.	"A Drum Is a Woman"	3:36
2.	"Rhythm Pum Te Dum"	2:53
3.	"What Else Can You Do with a Drum"	1:50
4.	"New Orleans"	2:29
5.	"Hey, Buddy Bolden"	4:51
6.	"Carribee Joe"	3:57
7.	"Congo Square"	4:55
8.	"A Drum Is a Woman, Part 2"	2:47
9.	"You Better Know It"	2:45
10.	"Madam Zajj"	2:47
11.	"Ballet of the Flying Saucers"	5:33
12.	"Zajj's Dream"	3:02
13.	"Rhumbop"	2:16
14.	"Carribee Joe, Part 2"	3:05
15.	"Finale"	3:51
16.	"Pomegranate" (Bonus track on CD reissue)	2:46

- Recorded at Columbia Records 30th Street Studio, New York, on September 17 (tracks 1, 6, 7 & 13), September 24 (tracks 2 & 3), September 25 (tracks 5, 8, 10 & 14), September 28 (tracks 4 & 12), October 23 (track 11), and December 6 (tracks 9 & 15), 1956.

== Personnel ==
- Duke Ellington – piano, narration
- Cat Anderson, Willie Cook, Ray Nance, Clark Terry – trumpet
- Quentin Jackson, Britt Woodman – trombone
- John Sanders – valve trombone
- Jimmy Hamilton – clarinet, tenor saxophone
- Rick Henderson – alto saxophone
- Russell Procope – alto saxophone, clarinet
- Paul Gonsalves – tenor saxophone
- Harry Carney – baritone saxophone
- Jimmy Woode – bass
- Sam Woodyard – drums
- Cándido Camero – percussion
- Joya Sherrill (5, 6, 12, 13, 14), Margaret Tynes (1, 8, 15, 16), Ozzie Bailey (3, 9, 15, 16) – vocals
