= Dance to the Duke! =

Studio album by Duke Ellington
- Released: 1954
- Recorded: April 7 & December 28, 1953, January 1 & 2, April 26, September 1, and October 8, 1954.
- Genre: Jazz
- Label: Capitol

Duke Ellington chronology
Ellington ‘55 (1954)	Dance to the Duke! (1954)	Ellington Showcase (1954)

Dance to the Duke! is an album by American pianist, composer and bandleader Duke Ellington recorded for the Capitol label in 1953. The album has not been released on CD but the tracks have appeared on The Complete Capitol Recordings of Duke Ellington released by Mosaic Records in 1995.

== Reception ==
The Allmusic review awarded the album 3 stars.

Professional ratings
Review scores
Source	Rating
Allmusic	3/5 stars

== Track listing ==
All compositions by Duke Ellington except as indicated

1. "C Jam Blues" – 4:52
2. "Orson" (Ellington, Billy Strayhorn) – 2:37
3. "Caravan" (Juan Tizol) – 4:32
4. "Kinda Dukish" – 2:32
5. "Bakiff" – 5:48
6. "Frivolous Banta" (Rick Henderson) – 2:39
7. "Things Ain't What They Used To Be" (Mercer Ellington) – 6:22
8. "Montevideo" – 2:33
- Recorded at Capitol Studios, Los Angeles on April 7, 1953 (track 2), December 28, 1953 (track 8), and September 1, 1954 (track 5), in San Francisco on April 26, 1954 (track 1) and in Chicago on January 1, 1954 (track 6), January 2, 1954 (track 7) and October 8, 1954 (track 3).
- "Montevideo" was mistakenly issued as "Night Time".

== Personnel ==
- Duke Ellington – piano
- Cat Anderson, Willie Cook, Ray Nance, Clark Terry, Gerald Wilson (tracks 1 & 5) – trumpet
- Quentin Jackson, George Jean (tracks 6–8), Juan Tizol (track 2), Britt Woodman – trombone
- John Sanders – valve trombone (tracks 1, 3 & 5)
- Russell Procope – alto saxophone, clarinet
- Rick Henderson – alto saxophone
- Paul Gonsalves – tenor saxophone
- Jimmy Hamilton – clarinet, tenor saxophone
- Harry Carney – baritone saxophone, bass clarinet
- Wendell Marshall (tracks 1, 2, & 4–8), Oscar Pettiford (track 3) – bass
- Butch Ballard (track 2), Dave Black – drums (tracks 1 & 3–8)
- Ralph Collier – congas (tracks 1 & 5)
- Frank Rollo – bongos (track 3)
