= Ellington '55 =

Studio album by Duke Ellington
- Released: 1955
- Recorded: Dec 21, 28 & 29, 1953, and January 1, 2 & 17, 1954
- Genre: Jazz
- Label: Capitol

Duke Ellington chronology
The Duke Plays Ellington (1953)	Ellington '55 (1955)	Dance to the Duke! (1954)

Ellington '55 is an album by American pianist, composer and bandleader Duke Ellington, recorded for the Capitol label in 1953 and 1954 and released in 1955. The album features the Ellington Orchestra's performances of popular big band compositions and was reissued on CD with two bonus tracks in 1999.

== Reception ==
The AllMusic review by Bruce Eder stated: "The tunes represented on this album were precisely what the band was playing at its dance dates... and it was material like this that was keeping the band going, filling those dates. So it is hard to argue with the album's programming, which reflected the taste of the most visible part of Ellington's audience. Additionally, what's here is quite fine in the playing".

Professional ratings
Review scores
Source	Rating
AllMusic	3/5 stars
The Penguin Guide to Jazz Recordings	3/4 stars
The Rolling Stone Jazz Record Guide	2/5 stars

== Track listing ==
All compositions by Duke Ellington except as indicated

1. "Rockin' in Rhythm" (Ellington, Harry Carney, Irving Mills) – 4:30
2. "Black and Tan Fantasy" (Ellington, James "Bubber" Miley) – 5:10
3. "Stompin' at the Savoy" (Benny Goodman, Andy Razaf, Edgar Sampson, Chick Webb) – 5:04
4. "In the Mood" (Joe Garland, Razaf) – 5:59
5. "One O'Clock Jump" (Count Basie, Eddie Durham) – 5:12
6. "Honeysuckle Rose" (Razaf, Fats Waller) – 4:17
7. "Happy Go Lucky Local" – 5:33
8. "Flying Home" (Goodman, Lionel Hampton, Eddie Delange) – 6:08
9. "Body and Soul" (Edward Heyman, Robert Sour, Frank Eyton, Johnny Green) – 4:47 Bonus track on CD reissue
10. "It Don't Mean a Thing (If It Ain't Got That Swing)" – 10:17 Bonus track on CD reissue
- Recorded at Capitol Studios, New York, on December 21, 1953 (tracks 6 & 8), December 28, 1953 (track 3), December 29, 1953 (track 2) and at Universal Studios, Chicago on January 1, 1954 (track 4), January 2, 1954 (track 5), January 17, 1954 (tracks 1 & 7), June 17, 1954 (track 10), and May 18, 1955 (track 9).

== Personnel ==
- Duke Ellington – piano
- Cat Anderson, Willie Cook, Ray Nance, Clark Terry – trumpet
- Alfred Cobbs (tracks 6 & 8), Quentin Jackson, George Jean (tracks 1–5 & 7), Britt Woodman – trombone
- John Sanders – valve trombone (tracks 9 & 10)
- Russell Procope – alto saxophone, clarinet
- Rick Henderson – alto saxophone
- Paul Gonsalves – tenor saxophone
- Jimmy Hamilton – clarinet, tenor saxophone
- Harry Carney – baritone saxophone, bass clarinet
- Wendell Marshall – bass
- Dave Black – drums
- Jimmy Grissom – vocal (track 3)
- Billy Strayhorn – celeste (track 2)
