= Diminuendo, Crescendo and Blues =

1958 studio album by the C Jam All-Stars, led by Paul Gonsalves

Studio album by Paul Gonsalves
- Recorded: November 15, 1958
- Studio: Munich
- Genre: Jazz
- Length: 36:02
- Label: RCA Victor

Paul Gonsalves chronology
Cookin' (1957)	Diminuendo, Crescendo and Blues (1958)	Ellingtonia Moods and Blues (1960)

Professional ratings
Review scores
Source	Rating
AllMusic	3/5 stars

Diminuendo, Crescendo and Blues is an album recorded in 1958 by the C Jam All-Stars led by Paul Gonsalves.

== Recording and music ==
The album was recorded in Munich on November 15, 1958, during a Duke Ellington orchestra tour of Europe. The musicians are tenor saxophonist Paul Gonsalves, trumpeter Clark Terry, local pianist Carlos Diernhammer, bassist Jimmy Woode, and drummer Sam Woodyard. The material "is a mix of Ellington tunes, a couple of standards, and five songs written by Terry or Gonsalves".

== Release and reception ==
Diminuendo, Crescendo and Blues was released in Germany by Bertelsmann Record Club. It was reissued on CD in the US by RCA Victor in 1999. The AllMusic reviewer commented on the brief running time of the CD version, but concluded that the album was "highly recommended".

== Track listing ==
1. "Diminuendo and Crescendo in Blue"
2. "I Cover the Waterfront"
3. "C Jam Blues"
4. "Evad"
5. "It Don't Mean a Thing (If It Ain't Got That Swing)"
6. "Autobahn"
7. "Willow Weep for Me"
8. "Hildegard"
9. "Ocean Motion"
10. "Jivin' With Fritz"

== Personnel ==
- Paul Gonsalves – tenor saxophone
- Clark Terry – trumpet
- Carlos Diernhammer – piano
- Jimmy Woode – bass
- Sam Woodyard – drums
