= Such Sweet Thunder =

1957 studio album by Duke Ellington and his Orchestra

Studio album by Duke Ellington and his Orchestra
- Released: April 1957 or May 1957
- Recorded: August 7, 1956 – May 3, 1957
- Genre: Big band
- Length: 35:57
- Label: Columbia/Legacy
- Producer: Irving Townsend

Duke Ellington and his Orchestra chronology
| Studio Sessions, Chicago 1956 (1956–57) | Such Sweet Thunder (1957) | All Star Road Band (1957) |

Such Sweet Thunder is a Duke Ellington album, released in 1957. The record is a twelve-part suite based on the works of William Shakespeare.

== Background ==
In August 1956, Ellington and his orchestra were performing in Stratford, Ontario, at the same time that the Stratford Shakespearean Festival was ongoing. Ellington and his longtime composing and arranging partner Billy Strayhorn talked to festival staffers, and Ellington soon announced his next album project would be a suite based on the works of Shakespeare. In addition to the Such Sweet Thunder album, he promised that the entire suite would be performed at the 1957 edition of the festival. Ellington and Strayhorn began building a home library of Shakespeare, seeking out Shakespeare experts, and reading through the canon during orchestra downtime. The title comes from Act IV, scene i, of A Midsummer Night's Dream, where Hippolyta says: "I never heard / So musical a discord, such sweet thunder."

The music that would constitute Such Sweet Thunder was written in just under three weeks and recorded in early 1957. Although most of the compositions were created for the suite in conjunction with Strayhorn, a few were versions of older Strayhorn songs that were reworked and re-titled for the collection.

== Critical reception ==
Professional ratings
Review scores
| Source | Rating |
|---|---|
| Allmusic | 4.5/5 stars |
| The Rolling Stone Jazz Record Guide | 5/5 stars |
| The Penguin Guide to Jazz Recordings | 4/4 stars |

NPR included this album in their "Basic Jazz Record Library".

== Track listing ==
All songs written by Duke Ellington and Billy Strayhorn, except where noted.

1. "Such Sweet Thunder" – 3:22
2. "Sonnet for Caesar" – 3:00
3. "Sonnet to Hank Cinq" – 1:24
4. "Lady Mac" – 3:41
5. "Sonnet in Search of a Moor" – 2:22
6. "The Telecasters" – 3:05
7. "Up and Down, Up and Down (I Will Lead Them Up and Down)" – 3:09
8. "Sonnet for Sister Kate" – 2:24
9. "The Star-Crossed Lovers" (Also known as "Pretty Girl") – 4:00
10. "Madness in Great Ones" – 3:26
11. "Half the Fun" (Also known as "Lately") – 4:19
12. "Circle of Fourths" – 1:45

=== Bonus tracks ===
13. "The Star-Crossed Lovers" (Also known as "Pretty Girl") (stereo LP master) – 4:15
14. "Circle of Fourths" (stereo LP master) – 1:47
15. "Suburban Beauty" (Ellington) – 2:56
16. "A-Flat Minor" (Ellington) – 2:33
17. "Café au Lait" – 2:49
18. "Half the Fun" (alternate take) – 4:08
19. "Suburban Beauty" (Alternate take) (Ellington) – 2:56
20. "A-Flat Minor" (outtake) (Ellington) – 3:49
21. "Café au Lait" – 6:21
22. "Pretty Girl" (Also known as the "Star-Crossed Lovers") (outtake) – 8:54

== Production/reissue credits ==
Musicians

- Johnny Hodges – alto saxophone
- Russell Procope – clarinet, alto saxophone
- Paul Gonsalves – tenor saxophone
- Jimmy Hamilton – clarinet, tenor saxophone
- Harry Carney – bass clarinet, baritone saxophone
- Cat Anderson, Clark Terry, Ray Nance, Willie Cook – trumpets
- Quentin Jackson, John Sanders, Britt Woodman – trombones
- Jimmy Woode – double bass
- Duke Ellington – piano, bandleader
- Sam Woodyard – drums
- Billy Strayhorn – orchestration

Production

- Irving Townsend – liner notes, producer
- Phil Schaap – reissue producer, liner notes remastering, research, restoration (No reissue retains Clark Terry's quotation, on the original LP release, of Puck's "Lord, what fools these mortals be!")
- Steven Berkowitz – A&R
- Darren Salmieri – A&R
- Mark Wilder – digital mastering
- Howard Fritzson – art direction
- Don Hunstein – photography
- Randall Martin – design
- Juliana Myrick – package manager

== Bibliography (further reading) ==
=== Contemporary reviews and journalism ===
- “Ellington Suite to Bow April 28” The New York Times. 15 April 1957.
- Parmenter, Ross. “Music: Weill and the Duke.” The New York Times 29 April 1957.
- “New Ellington Suite Hailed By Coast-to-Coast Audience.” Daily Defender. 2 July 1957.
- Wilson, John S. “Duke Bounces Back With Provocative Work.” The New York Times. 13 Oct. 1957. esp 113
- Wilson, John S. “Jazz: Ellington.” The New York Times 13 October 1957.

=== Historical and analytical writings (in reverse chronological order) ===
- Bradbury, David. Duke Ellington. London: Haus, 2005. Esp. pp. 91.
- Lanier, Douglas. “To Be-Bop or Not to Be-Bop; Minstrelsy, Jazz, Rap: Shakespeare, African American Music, and Cultural Legitimation.” Borrowers and Lenders: The Journal of Shakespeare and Appropriation Vol. 1, 2005 [no pagination].
- Buhler, Stephen M. “Form and Character in Duke Ellington’s and Billy Strayhorn’s Such Sweet Thunder.” Borrowers and Lenders: The Journal of Shakespeare and Appropriation Vol. 1, 2005 [no pagination].
- Nicholson, Stuart. Reminiscing in Tempo: A Portrait of Duke Ellington. Northeastern University Press, 1999, esp. pp. ???-???.
- Lambert, Eddie. Duke Ellington: A Listener’s Guide. Lanham, Md.: Scarecrow Press, 1999. Esp. pp. 193–194.
- Kernfeld, Barry. New Grove Dictionary of Jazz. St. Martin's Press, 1994. esp 331
- Hasse, John Edward. Beyond Category: The Life and Genius of Duke Ellington. New York: Simon and Schuster, 1993.
- Tucker, Mark. The Duke Ellington Reader. New York: Oxford University Press, 1993. Esp. pp. 321, 441. esp. pp. 339–341, 393
  - Harrison, Max. “Max Harrison: Some Reflections on Ellington’s Longer Works. The Duke Ellington Reader. Tucker, Mark, ed. (esp. pg.393).
  - Crouch, Stanley. “Stanley Crouch on Such Sweet Thunder, Suite Thursday, and Anatomy of a Murder.” The Duke Ellington Reader. Tucker, Mark, ed. (esp. 339, 441).
- Hasse, John. Beyond Category: The Life and Genius of Duke Ellington. New York: Simon & Schuster. 1993. Esp. pp. 331–333, 362.
- Timmer, W.E. Ellingtonia: The recorded music of Duke Ellington and his sidemen. Metuchen, N.J.: Institute of Jazz Studies: Scarecrow Press, 1988. Esp. pp. 450.
- Marsalis, Wynton. “What Jazz is and Isn’t.” The New York Times. 31, July 1988.
- Ellington, Mercer. Duke Ellington in Person: An Intimate Memoir. Boston: Houghton Mifflin Co., 1978. Esp. pp. 117.
- Ellington, Duke. Music is My Mistress. New York: Da Capo Press, 1976, c1973. Esp. pp. 192.
