= Ella Fitzgerald Sings the Duke Ellington Song Book =

1957 studio album by Ella Fitzgerald

Studio album by Ella Fitzgerald
- Released: 1957
- Recorded: June 25 – October 17, 1957
- Genre: Jazz
- Length: 166:32
- Labels: Verve MGV 4008-2 (Volume 1) and MGV 4009-2 (Volume 2)
- Producer: Norman Granz

Ella Fitzgerald chronology
Ella and Louis Again (1957)	Ella Fitzgerald Sings the Duke Ellington Song Book (1957)	Ella and Her Fellas (1957)

Duke Ellington chronology
All Star Road Band (1957)	Ella Fitzgerald sings the Duke Ellington Song Book (1957)	Ellington Indigos (1957)

Professional ratings
Review scores
Source	Rating
AllMusic	4.5/5 stars
Disc	5/5 stars
The Encyclopedia of Popular Music	4/5 stars
The Penguin Guide to Jazz Recordings	4/4 stars
The Rolling Stone Jazz Record Guide	5/5 stars

Ella Fitzgerald Sings the Duke Ellington Song Book is a 1957 studio album by the American jazz singer Ella Fitzgerald, accompanied by Duke Ellington and his orchestra, focusing on Ellington's songs.

Part of Fitzgerald's "Song Book" series, it is the only one where the composer is also featured as a performer and the first occasion Fitzgerald recorded with Ellington. It is also the entry in the Song Book series that provided her with the most opportunities to exhibit her skill at scat singing.

The greater part of disc three is devoted to two original compositions by Billy Strayhorn, inspired by Fitzgerald's life, character, and artistry. Fitzgerald's performance on this album won her the Grammy Award for Best Jazz Performance, Individual, at the 1st Annual Grammy Awards.

The album was released in two volumes: the first features Fitzgerald with the Ellington orchestra, while the second, finds her in a small group setting.

This album marked the start of a fruitful artistic relationship for Fitzgerald and Ellington. The 1960s would see them perform on the Côte d'Azur for the album Ella and Duke at the Cote D'Azur (1966), and in Sweden for The Stockholm Concert, 1966. Their only other studio album is Ella at Duke's Place (1965).

== Track listing ==
For the 1957 Verve 4-LP set: Verve MGV 4010-4

Recorded June 15–October 27, 1957, Hollywood, Los Angeles, California.

=== Side one ===
No.	Title	Writer(s)	Length
1.	"Rockin' in Rhythm"	Harry Carney, Duke Ellington, Irving Mills	5:17
2.	"Drop Me Off in Harlem"	Nick Kenny	3:48
3.	"Day Dream"	John La Touche, Billy Strayhorn	3:56
4.	"Caravan"	Ellington, Mills, Juan Tizol	3:51
5.	"Take the "A" Train"	Strayhorn	6:37

=== Side two ===
No.	Title	Writer(s)	Length
1.	"I Ain't Got Nothin' But the Blues"	Ellington, Don George	4:39
2.	"Clementine"	Strayhorn	2:37
3.	"I Didn't Know About You"	Bob Russell	4:10
4.	"I'm Beginning to See the Light"	Ellington, George, Johnny Hodges, Harry James	3:24
5.	"Lost in Meditation"	Mills, Lou Singer, Tizol	3:24
6.	"Perdido"	Ervin Drake, H.J. Lengsfelder, Tizol	6:10

=== Side three ===
No.	Title	Writer(s)	Length
1.	"Cotton Tail"	Duke Ellington	3:23
2.	"Do Nothin' Till You Hear from Me"	Russell	7:38
3.	"Just A-Sittin' and A-Rockin'"	Lee Gaines, Strayhorn	3:30
4.	"(In My) Solitude"	Eddie DeLange, Duke Ellington, Irving Mills	2:04
5.	"Rocks in My Bed"	Duke Ellington	3:56

=== Side four ===
No.	Title	Writer(s)	Length
1.	"Satin Doll"	Johnny Mercer, Strayhorn	3:26
2.	"Sophisticated Lady"	Mitchell Parish	5:18
3.	"Just Squeeze Me (But Please Don't Tease Me)"	Gaines	4:13
4.	"It Don't Mean a Thing (If It Ain't Got That Swing)"	Ellington, Mills	4:12
5.	"Azure"	Mills	2:18

=== Side five ===
No.	Title	Writer(s)	Length
1.	"I Let a Song Go Out of My Heart"	Mills, Henry Nemo, John Redmond	4:08
2.	"In a Sentimental Mood"	Manny Kurtz, Mills	2:44
3.	"Don't Get Around Much Anymore"	Russell	4:59
4.	"Prelude to a Kiss"	Irving Gordon, Mills	5:26

=== Side six ===
No.	Title	Writer(s)	Length
1.	"Mood Indigo"	Barney Bigard, Mills	3:24
2.	"In a Mellow Tone"	Milt Gabler	5:07
3.	"Love You Madly"	Ellington	4:37
4.	"Lush Life"	Strayhorn	3:37
5.	"Squatty Roo"	Hodges	3:38

=== Side seven ===
No.	Title	Writer(s)	Length
1.	"I'm Just a Lucky So-and-So"	Mack David	4:12
2.	"All Too Soon"	Carl Sigman	4:22
3.	"Everything But You""	George, James	2:53
4.	"I Got it Bad (And That Ain't Good)"	Paul Francis Webster	6:11
5.	"Bli Blip"	Sid Kuller	3:01
6.	"Chelsea Bridge"	Strayhorn	3:20

=== Side eight ===
No.	Title	Writer(s)	Length
1.	"Portrait of Ella Fitzgerald"; First Movement: "Royal Ancestry"; Second Movement: "All Heart"; Third Movement: "Beyond Category"; Fourth Movement: "Total Jazz"	Strayhorn	16:10
2.	"The E and D Blues (E for Ella, D for Duke)"	Strayhorn	4:48

Bonus Tracks; Issued on the Verve 1999 3CD re-issue, Verve 314 559 248-2

4. "Chelsea Bridge – rehearsal" – 4:03
5. "Chelsea Bridge – rehearsal" – 3:37
6. "Chelsea Bridge – rehearsal" – 3:59
7. "Chelsea Bridge – rehearsal" – 3:20
8. "Chelsea Bridge – rehearsal" – 1:38
9. "Chelsea Bridge – rehearsal" – 1:20
10. "Chelsea Bridge – rehearsal" – 5:35
11. "Chelsea Bridge – rehearsal" – 3:39
12. "All Heart – rehearsal" – 3:54
13. "All Heart – alternative take I" – 3:33
14. "All Heart – alternative take II" – 3:22
15. "All Heart – alternative take III" – 3:25

== Personnel ==
- Ella Fitzgerald – vocals
- William "Cat" Anderson, Clark Terry, Willie Cook – trumpet
- Dizzy Gillespie – trumpet on "Take the "A" Train"
- Frank Foster – tenor saxophone
- Paul Gonsalves, Ben Webster – saxophone
- Johnny Hodges – alto saxophone
- Russell Procope – clarinet, alto saxophone
- Jimmy Hamilton – clarinet, tenor saxophone
- Harry Carney – clarinet, bass clarinet
- John Sanders, Britt Woodman, Quentin Jackson – trombone
- Ray Nance – trumpet, violin
- Stuff Smith – violin
- Oscar Peterson, Paul Smith – piano
- Ray Brown, Joe Mondragon, Jimmy Woode – double bass
- Barney Kessel – guitar (disc 1: 12–18, disc 2: 1–7, duo with Ella in "Solitude", "Azure", "In a Sentimental Mood")
- Herb Ellis – guitar (disc 2: 8–12)
- Sam Woodyard, Alvin Stoller – drums
- Billy Strayhorn – piano, narrator
- Duke Ellington – piano, narrator, arranger, conductor
