= Out on a Limb with Clark Terry =

Studio album by Clark Terry
- Released: 1958
- Recorded: July 26, 1957
- Studio: Sheldon Recording Studios, Chicago
- Genre: Jazz
- Length: 26:02
- Label: Argo; LP 620
- Producer: Daddy-O Daylie

Clark Terry chronology
Serenade to a Bus Seat (1957)	Out on a Limb with Clark Terry (1958)	Duke with a Difference (1957)

Out on a Limb with Clark Terry is an album by American jazz trumpeter Clark Terry featuring tracks recorded in 1957 and released on the Argo label. The album was released on CD combined with Paul Gonsalves' Cookin' (Argo, 1957) as Daylight Express in 1998.

== Reception ==
Professional ratings
Review scores
Source	Rating
AllMusic	3/5 stars

AllMusic awarded the original album 3 stars.

== Track listing ==
All compositions by Clark Terry, except where indicated.

1. "Caravan" (Juan Tizol) – 2:01
2. "Candy" (Mack David, Alex Kramer, Joan Whitney) – 2:21
3. "Clark's Expedition" (Mike Simpson, Clark Terry) – 2:29
4. "Trumpet Mouthpiece Blues" – 4:05
5. "Phalanges" (Clark Terry, Louie Bellson) – 3:02
6. "Blues for Daddy-O's Jazz Patio Blues" – 4:32
7. "Basin Street Blues" (Spencer Williams) – 2:44
8. "Daylight Express" – 2:16
9. "Taking a Chance on Love" (Vernon Duke, Ted Fetter, John La Touche) – 2:18

== Personnel ==
- Clark Terry – trumpet
- Mike Simpson – saxophone, flute
- Remo Biondi – guitar
- Willie Jones – piano
- Jimmy Woode – bass
- Sam Woodyard – drums
