= Duke with a Difference =

Studio album by Clark Terry
- Released: October 1957
- Recorded: July 29 & September 6, 1957
- Studio: Reeves Sound, New York City
- Genre: Jazz
- Length: 38:09
- Label: Riverside
- Producer: Orrin Keepnews

Clark Terry chronology
Serenade to a Bus Seat (1957)	Duke with a Difference (1957)	In Orbit (1958)

Duke with a Difference is an album by American jazz trumpeter Clark Terry featuring tracks recorded in 1957 for the Riverside label.

== Reception ==
Professional ratings
Review scores
Source	Rating
AllMusic	4/5 stars
The Penguin Guide to Jazz Recordings	3/4 stars

AllMusic awarded the album 4 stars, stating:

Clark Terry and some of the top Ellington sidemen of the period perform eight songs associated with Duke, but with fresh arrangements. There is plenty of solo space for Terry, Gonsalves, and Hodges, and the arrangements by Terry and Mercer Ellington cast a new light on some of the warhorses.

== Track listing ==
All compositions by Duke Ellington except as indicated

1. "C Jam Blues" (Barney Bigard, Duke Ellington) – 3:06
2. "In a Sentimental Mood" (Ellington, Irving Mills, Manny Kurtz) – 2:58
3. "Cotton Tail" – 6:56
4. "Just Squeeze Me" – 6:17
5. "Mood Indigo" (Bigard, Ellington) – 6:57
6. "Take the "A" Train" (Billy Strayhorn) – 3:31
7. "In a Mellow Tone" – 5:09
8. "Come Sunday" – 3:34
- Recorded at Reeves Sound Studios in New York City on July 29 (tracks 2 & 8) and September 6 (tracks 1 & 3–7), 1957

== Musicians ==
- Clark Terry – trumpet (all), arranger (tracks 1 & 3–7)
- Quentin Jackson (tracks 2 & 8), Britt Woodman (tracks 1 & 3–7) – trombone
- Johnny Hodges – alto saxophone (tracks 1, 2, 4, 5 & 8)
- Paul Gonsalves – tenor saxophone (tracks 1 & 3–7)
- Tyree Glenn – vibraphone, trombone (tracks 1 & 3–7)
- Billy Strayhorn – piano (tracks 2 & 8), arranger (tracks 2 & 8)
- Luther Henderson – celeste (track 2)
- Jimmy Woode – bass (all)
- Sam Woodyard – drums (all)
- Marian Bruce – vocals (track 2)
- Mercer Ellington – arranger (tracks 2 & 8)

== Production personnel ==
- Producer and liner notes – Orrin Keepnews
- Engineer – Jack Higgins (tracks 2 & 8)
- Engineer – Jack Matthewes (tracks 1, 3–7)
- Cover photo – Paul Weller
- Cover design – Paul Bacon
