= Encuentro (album) =

Studio album by Paul Gonsalves
- Released: 1969
- Recorded: 1968
- Genre: Jazz
- Length: 42:30

Professional ratings
Review scores
Source	Rating
The Penguin Guide to Jazz Recordings	2.5/4 stars

Encuentro is an album by jazz saxophonist Paul Gonsalves that was released in the U.S. in 1977 by Catalyst Records under the name The Buenos Aires Sessions. Fresh Sound reissued the album under the title Encuentro in 1989.

== Track listing ==
1. "Perdido"
2. "I Cover the Waterfront"
3. "Blues for B. A."
4. "St. Louis Blues"
5. "Gone with the Wind/Tenderly/Ramona"
6. "Just Friends"
7. "I Can't Get Started"

== Personnel ==
- Paul Gonsalves – tenor saxophone
- Willie Cook – trumpet
- Enrique Villegas – piano
- Alfredo Remus – bass guitar
- Eduardo Casalla – drums
