= Sabby =

Sabby may refer to:

- Sabby Lewis, American musician
- Sabby Piscitelli, American NFL player and professional wrestler
