= Clark Terry (album) =

Studio album by Clark Terry
- Released: 1955
- Recorded: January 3 & 4, 1955
- Studio: Fine Sound Studios, 711 Fifth Avenue, NYC
- Genre: Jazz
- Length: 40:40
- Label: EmArcy; MG 36007

Clark Terry chronology
Clark Terry (1955)	Serenade to a Bus Seat (1957)

Clark Terry (also released as Introducing Clark Terry and Swahili) is the debut album by American jazz trumpeter Clark Terry featuring tracks recorded in early 1955 and released on the EmArcy label.

== Reception ==
Professional ratings
Review scores
Source	Rating
Allmusic	4.5/5 stars

Allmusic awarded the album 4 1/2 stars, stating: "There are no losers in this swinging meeting".

== Track listing ==
All compositions by Clark Terry except as indicated

1. "Swahili" (Quincy Jones) - 6:07
2. "Double Play" (Jones) - 3:33
3. "Slow Boat" - 4:28
4. "Co-Op" (Terry, Rick Henderson) - 3:45
5. "Kitten" - 5:35
6. "The Countess" (Freddie Green, Terry) - 6:42
7. "Tuma" (Jones) - 3:06
8. "Chuckles" - 4:19
- Recorded at Fine Sound Studios, New York City, on January 3 (tracks 1–4) and January 4 (tracks 5–8), 1955

== Personnel ==
- Clark Terry - trumpet
- Jimmy Cleveland - trombone
- Cecil Payne - baritone saxophone
- Horace Silver - piano
- Wendell Marshall - bass
- Oscar Pettiford - bass, cello
- Art Blakey - drums
- Quincy Jones - arranger
