= Tell It the Way It Is! =

Studio album by Paul Gonsalves
- Released: September 24, 1963
- Recorded: September 4, 1963
- Genre: Jazz
- Length: 36:04
- Label: Impulse
- Producer: Bob Thiele

Paul Gonsalves chronology
'Tenor Stuff' (1960)	Tell It the Way It Is! (1961)	'Cleopatra Feelin' Jazzy' (1961)

Professional ratings
Review scores
Source	Rating
Allmusic	3/5 stars
The Penguin Guide to Jazz Recordings	3.5/4 stars
Record Mirror	3/5 stars

Tell It the Way It Is! is an album recorded in 1963 by saxophonist Paul Gonsalves. He is joined by Johnny Hodges and Ray Nance, both members of the Duke Ellington Orchestra, pianist Walter Bishop Jr., and trumpeter Rolf Ericson.

== Track listing ==
1. "Tell It the Way It Is!" (Addison Amor/Walter Bishop Jr.) – 11:37
2. "Things Ain't What They Used to Be" (Mercer Ellington/Ted Persons) – 4:43
3. "Duke's Place" (Duke Ellington/Bob Katz/Bob Thiele) – 5:28
4. "Impulsive" (Johnny Hodges) – 5:01
5. "Rapscallion in Rab's Canyon" (Johnny Hodges) – 3:46
6. "Body and Soul" (Frank Eyton/Johnny Green/Edward Heyman/Robert Sour) – 5:35

== Personnel ==
- Paul Gonsalves – tenor saxophone
- Johnny Hodges – alto saxophone
- Ray Nance – trumpet, violin
- Rolf Ericson – trumpet
- Walter Bishop Jr. – piano
- Ernie Shepard – bass, vocals
- Osie Johnson – drums
