= Blue Rose (album) =

Studio album by Rosemary Clooney and Duke Ellington and His Orchestra
- Released: May 21, 1956
- Recorded: January–February 1956
- Genre: Traditional pop, vocal jazz
- Length: 39:04
- Label: Columbia
- Producer: Irving Townsend

Rosemary Clooney and Duke Ellington and His Orchestra chronology
Blue Rose (1956)	Ring Around Rosie (1957)

Duke Ellington chronology
Ellington Showcase (1955)	Blue Rose (1956)	Ellington at Newport (1956)

Professional ratings
Review scores
Source	Rating
AllMusic	4.5/5 stars

Blue Rose is the debut studio album by Rosemary Clooney, in collaboration with Duke Ellington and his orchestra, released in mono on Columbia Records, catalogue CL 872. Although she had appeared on albums before, it had been in the context of either a musical theater or multiple artist recording. The album also marked the return of Ellington to Columbia after an absence of four years, and was one of the first examples of overdubbing being used as an integral part of the creation, rather than for effects or to correct mistakes.

== Background and content ==
During the early 1950s, it had been the policy of both company president Goddard Lieberson and producer Mitch Miller at Columbia to discourage their roster of popular singers from planning full albums, the LP reserved for serious work such as classical music or original cast recordings. This policy changed with the success of popular music albums on other labels, and to give the return of Ellington to the fold exposure beyond the jazz audience, producer Irving Townsend decided on pairing the Ellington band with a singer for a full album, choosing Clooney for her sultry voice and her spate of hit records throughout the decade.

The project encountered difficulty from Clooney being both on the outs with her usual producer Mitch Miller and pregnant in Los Angeles, with the Ellington Orchestra being recorded in New York. With Townsend at the helm, Clooney agreed to the project, and long-time Ellington orchestrator and musical foil Billy Strayhorn was dispatched to guide Clooney through the arrangements and recording in L.A.

Recordings of the Ellington Orchestra took place on January 23 and 27, 1956, at Columbia's 30th Street Studio in New York, and Clooney's vocals were recorded for overdubbing to the New York track on February 8 and 11 in Los Angeles. The material selected originated from the Ellington songbook, and all songs were arranged by Strayhorn. The title tune was specifically written by Ellington for the album and Clooney.

On June 15, 1999, Legacy Records reissued the album remastered for compact disc. Two bonus tracks were added from the sessions that were not included on the original LP, released as Columbia single 55591 "If You Were in My Place (What Would You Do?)" and its b-side "Just A-Sittin' and A-Rockin'."

== Track listing ==
Side one
No.	Title	Writer(s)	Length
1.	"Hey Baby"	Duke Ellington	3:53
2.	"Sophisticated Lady"	Duke Ellington, Irving Mills, Mitchell Parish	2:57
3.	"Me and You"	Duke Ellington	2:28
4.	"Passion Flower"	Billy Strayhorn, Milton Raskin (lyrics)	4:33
5.	"I Let a Song Go Out of My Heart"	Duke Ellington, Irving Mills, Henry Nemo, John Redmond	2:37
6.	"It Don't Mean a Thing (If It Ain't Got That Swing)"	Duke Ellington, Irving Mills	2:48

Side two
No.	Title	Writer(s)	Length
1.	"Grievin'"	Duke Ellington, Billy Strayhorn	4:20
2.	"Blue Rose"	Duke Ellington	2:21
3.	"I'm Checkin' Out - Goombye"	Duke Ellington, Billy Strayhorn	3:09
4.	"I Got It Bad (and That Ain't Good)"	Duke Ellington, Paul Francis Webster	3:07
5.	"Mood Indigo"	Duke Ellington, Barney Bigard, Irving Mills	6:28

1999 bonus tracks
No.	Title	Writer(s)	Length
12.	"If You Were in My Place (What Would You Do?)"	Duke Ellington, Irving Mills, Henry Nemo	3:01
13.	"Just A-Sittin' and A-Rockin'"	Duke Ellington, Billy Strayhorn, Lee Gaines	2:40

== Personnel ==
- Rosemary Clooney – vocals
- Duke Ellington – piano
- Billy Strayhorn – arranger, conductor, piano on bonus tracks
- Cat Anderson, Willie Cook, Ray Nance, Clark Terry – trumpets
- Quentin Jackson, Britt Woodman – trombones
- John Sanders – valve trombone
- Russell Procope – alto saxophone, clarinet
- Johnny Hodges – alto saxophone
- Jimmy Hamilton – tenor saxophone, clarinet
- Paul Gonsalves – tenor saxophone
- Harry Carney – baritone saxophone
- Jimmy Woode – bass
- Sam Woodyard – drums
