= Cleopatra Feelin' Jazzy =

Studio album by Paul Gonsalves
- Released: May 21, 1963
- Recorded: 1963
- Studio: Van Gelder Studio, Englewood Cliffs, NJ
- Genre: Jazz
- Length: 41
- Label: Impulse! Records
- Producer: Bob Thiele

Paul Gonsalves chronology
Tell It the Way It Is! (1963)	Cleopatra Feelin' Jazzy (1963)	Salt and Pepper (1963)

Professional ratings
Review scores
Source	Rating
Down Beat	3/5 stars
Allmusic	4/5 stars

Cleopatra Feelin' Jazzy is a jazz album recorded in 1963 by Paul Gonsalves.

== Track listing ==
1. "Caesar and Cleopatra Theme"
2. "Antony and Cleopatra Theme"
3. "Bluz for Liz"
4. "Cleo's Blues"
5. "Action in Alexandria"
6. "Cleo's Asp"
7. "Cleopatra's Lament"
8. "Second Chance" (Previously unreleased single)

== Personnel ==
- Paul Gonsalves - Tenor Saxophone
- Hank Jones - Piano
- Dick Hyman - Organ
- Kenny Burrell - Guitar
- George Duvivier - Bass
- Roy Haynes - drums
- Manny Albam - percussion
