= I Let a Song Go Out of My Heart =

1938 composition by Duke Ellington

"I Let a Song Go Out of My Heart" is a 1938 composition by Duke Ellington, with lyrics added by Irving Mills, Henry Nemo and John Redmond. The song became a number one hit for Ellington in 1938. Other hit versions the same year were by Benny Goodman (with Martha Tilton singing), Jimmy Dorsey (with June Richmond singing), Connee Boswell, Hot Lips Page, and Mildred Bailey. It was performed as part of The Cotton Club Parade of 1938.

== Other recordings ==
- Tony Bennett - for the album Tony Makes It Happen (1967).
- June Christy - included in the album Mood Indigo: Capitol Sings Duke Ellington (1994).
- Rosemary Clooney - for the album Blue Rose (1956)
- Bing Crosby recorded the song in 1957 for use on his radio show and it was subsequently included in the album With All My Heart (2012).
- Ella Fitzgerald - in the album Ella Fitzgerald Sings the Duke Ellington Song Book (1957)
- Gogi Grant - for her album Suddenly There's Gogi Grant (1956).
- Lena Horne - for her album Lena...Lovely and Alive (1962).
- Irene Kral - on her album The Band and I (1958)
- Thelonious Monk included it on his album Thelonious Monk Plays the Music of Duke Ellington (1955).
- Patti Page - included in her album You Go to My Head (1956)
- Don Shirley recorded the song on his album Piano Perspectives in 1955.
- Mel Torme - for his album Prelude to a Kiss (1958)
- Sarah Vaughan - The Duke Ellington Songbook, Vol. 1 (1979)
- Dinah Washington recorded the song in her album After Hours with Miss "D" in 1954.

== Film appearance ==
- 2004 Melinda and Melinda - Performed by Duke Ellington, Dick Hyman.

== Sources ==
Jazz Standards
