= Gettin' Together (Paul Gonsalves album) =

Gettin' Together!

Studio album by Paul Gonsalves
- Released: 1961
- Recorded: December 20, 1960
- Genre: Jazz
- Length: 39.24
- Label: Jazzland
- Producer: Orrin Keepnews

Paul Gonsalves chronology
Ellingtonia Moods and Blues (1960)	Gettin' Together! (1961)	Tenor Stuff (1961)

Gettin' Together! is an album recorded in 1960 by Paul Gonsalves. AllMusic's Scott Yanow awarded the album 4 1/2 stars. He wrote "The music is straight-ahead and shows that Gonsalves was quite capable of playing with younger "modernists"." The Penguin Guide to Jazz Recordings describes it as “a remarkable album, beautifully played and recorded.”

It was voted number 1 in the 50 All-Time Overlooked Jazz Albums from Colin Larkin's All Time Top 1000 Albums.

Professional ratings
Review scores
Source	Rating
AllMusic	
Encyclopedia of Popular Music	4/5 stars
The Penguin Guide to Jazz Recordings	4/4 stars

== Track listing ==
1. "Yesterdays" (Otto Harbach/Jerome Kern) - 3.32
2. "J. And B. Blues" (Joe Livramento) 4:57
3. "I Surrender, Dear" (Harry Barris, Gordon Clifford) 4:22
4. "Hard Groove" (Paul Gonsalves) 4:57
5. "Low Gravy" (Jelly Roll Morton) 7:51
6. "I Cover the Waterfront" (Johnny Green, Edward Heyman) 4:06
7. "Gettin' Together" (Babs Gonzales) 4:54
8. "Walkin"' (Richard Carpenter) 4:45

== Personnel ==
- Paul Gonsalves - Tenor saxophone
- Nat Adderley - Cornet, except tracks 3, 6 & 8
- Wynton Kelly - Piano
- Sam Jones - Bass
- Jimmy Cobb - Drums
