= Tenor Stuff =

Studio album by Paul Gonsalves
- Released: 1961
- Recorded: 1961
- Genre: Jazz
- Length: 49:50
- Label: Columbia Lansdowne Jazz

Paul Gonsalves chronology
Gettin' Together! (1961)	Tenor Stuff (1961)	Tell It the Way It Is! (1963)

Tenor Stuff is an album recorded in 1961 by Paul Gonsalves and Harold Ashby.

== Track listing ==
1. "You Came Along from Out of Nowhere"
2. "Swallowing the Blues"
3. "London Broil"
4. "Midnight Sun"
5. "Squeeze Me"
6. "Jeeps Blues"
7. "You Can Depend on Me"

== Performers ==
- Paul Gonsalves - Tenor Saxophone / Guitar
- Harold Ashby - Tenor Saxophone
- Ray Nance - trumpet, violin and vocals
- Sir Charles Thompson - Piano
- Aaron Bell - Bass
- Jo Jones - drums
