= The Colorful Strings of Jimmy Woode =

Studio album by Jimmy Woode
- Released: 1958
- Recorded: September 2, 1957; Chicago
- Genre: Jazz
- Label: Argo; LP 630

The Colorful Strings of Jimmy Woode is the sole album led by American jazz bassist Jimmy Woode featuring tracks recorded in 1957 and released on the Argo label.

== Reception ==
Professional ratings
Review scores
Source	Rating
Allmusic	4/5 stars

Allmusic awarded the album 4 stars stating "this rare opportunity to record as a leader, which first appeared as an Argo LP in 1958, is a welcome look into his abilities as a composer and arranger as well".

== Track listing ==
All compositions by Jimmy Woode except as indicated

1. "Falmouth Recollections" - 3:06
2. "The Way You Look Tonight" (Dorothy Fields, Jerome Kern) - 4:42
3. "Foofy for President" - 6:39
4. "The Man From Potter's Crossing" - 4:21
5. "Dance of the Reluctant Drag" - 4:22
6. "Empathy, For Ruth" - 3:24

== Personnel ==
- Jimmy Woode - bass, vocals (2)
- Mike Simpson - flute
- Clark Terry - trumpet
- Britt Woodman - trombone
- Porter Kilbert - alto saxophone
- Paul Gonsalves - tenor saxophone
- Ramsey Lewis - piano
- Sam Woodyard - drums
