= Cookin' (Paul Gonsalves album) =

Studio album by Paul Gonsalves
- Released: 1957
- Recorded: August 6, 1957; Sheldon Recording Studios, Chicago
- Genre: Jazz
- Label: Argo Records
- Producer: Leonard Chess

Paul Gonsalves chronology
Cookin' (1957)	Diminuendo, Crescendo and Blues (1958)

Cookin' is an album by Paul Gonsalves, released in 1957 by Argo Records. The album was re-released on CD in 2008 with bonus tracks from Clark Terry's Out on a Limb with Clark Terry (Argo, 1957) and The Jazz School (EmArcy, 1956) by Fresh Sound.

== Reception ==
Professional ratings
Review scores
Source	Rating
AllMusic	4.5/5 stars
The Penguin Guide to Jazz Recordings	3/4 stars

AllMusic awarded the album 4 1/2 stars. The authors of Penguin Guide, reviewing a GRP Clark Terry compilation (Daybreak Express, also containing the Clark Terry album, 4 stars), wrote that the tracks with Gonsalves "are far and away the most interesting things on the record".

== Track listing ==
All compositions by Paul Gonsalves, except as indicated

1. "Festival" - 6:54
2. "Clark's Bars" (Clark Terry) - 3:38
3. "Daddy-O's Patio" (Terry) - 2:16
4. "Blues" - 5:01
5. "Impeccable" - 4:20
6. "Paul's Idea" - 2:48
7. "Phat Bach" (Terry) - 3:18
8. "Milli Terry" (Terry) - 2:34
9. "Funky" (Terry) - 4:04

== Personnel ==
- Paul Gonsalves - Tenor saxophone
- Clark Terry - Trumpet
- Willie Jones - Piano
- Jimmy Woode - Bass
- Sam Woodyard - drums
