= Phil Edmund =

American trumpeter and bandleader

Felix Edmond Barboza (November 20, 1914 – April 9, 1993) was an American trumpeter and bandleader. He was known professionally as Phil Edmund, including in his jazz and big band music, and as Phil Barboza in his Latin American music.

== Early life ==
Born in New Bedford, Massachusetts, of Cape Verdean parents, Edmund was captivated at an early age by the musical repertoire of the Cape Verde islands.

He attended Lawrence High School in Falmouth, MA, where he played trumpet in the school's orchestra and graduated in 1934.

== Career ==
Advertisement for "Phil Edmund and the Hottest Colored Band in New England" in The Newport Daily Express

Edmund played Creole and swing music, and sometimes jazz with Louis Armstrong and others. Edmund also played with Boston-area jazz musicians such as Roy Haynes and Pete Brown. Early in his career, he was a big band trumpet player in New York with bandleaders such as Count Basie, Duke Ellington, and Benny Carter.

In the late 1930s, he started a big band called the Phil Edmund Orchestra (also called the Phil Edmund Band). It played at dances and clubs in the New England area, including in New Bedford, Providence, Martha's Vineyard, and at colleges. The band included Bob Chestnut, Joe Livramento, Paul Gonsalves, and Vicki Vieira.

A newspaper article in 1940 describing local trends in dance hall music in Gloucester, MA, included Phil Edmund's orchestra and said "one of their specialties is swinging out of age-old sea chanties". Many Cape Verdean Americans in the region descended from people who worked in New England whaling in the 19th century.

Phil Edmund's band provided Chick Corea his first paying gig. The style of music the band played came to influence the music Corea created by putting Latin music on his radar.

Edmund introduced Gonsalves to Basie, which was a major turning point in Gonsalves' career.

In the 1960s, he reunited Livramento and Gonsalves, also Cape Verdean Americans, to publish records featuring Portuguese and Latin American music. That decade, Edmund performed at the Apollo Theater in New York.

Edmund was a member of musician's union locals in Boston and New York. He also held a private pilot license.

== Death ==
On April 9, 1993, he died in Hyannis, Massachusetts, of a heart ailment at Cape Cod Hospital when he was 78 years old.

== Discography ==
=== As Phil Barboza ===
- Só Sabe (LP, Album) Cabo-Verde Records, 1962?
- Phil Barboza and His Latin American Music (7", EP) Cabo-Verde Records, 1962
- "Se Olho E Preto E Doce" / "Mumzinha" (7") Cabo-Verde Records 1962?
- "Sufrimente" / "Milho-Branco" (7") Cabo-Verde Records, 1962
