= Top and Bottom Brass =

Studio album by the Clark Terry Quintet with Don Butterfield
- Released: 1959
- Recorded: February 24 & 26, 1959; New York City
- Genre: Jazz
- Length: 42:16
- Labels: Riverside; RLP 12-295
- Producer: Orrin Keepnews

Clark Terry chronology
In Orbit (1958)	Top and Bottom Brass (1959)	Tate-a-Tate (1960)

Top and Bottom Brass is an album by trumpeter Clark Terry featuring performances recorded in early 1959 and originally released on the Riverside label.

== Reception ==
Professional ratings
Review scores
Source	Rating
Allmusic	4/5 stars
The Penguin Guide to Jazz Recordings	3/4 stars

Scott Yanow of Allmusic says, "Terry is in fine form on a variety of blues, originals and obscurities along with the interesting versions of "My Heart Belongs to Daddy" and "A Sunday Kind of Love" but the results overall are not all that significant".

== Track listing ==
All compositions by Clark Terry except as indicated

1. "Mili-Terry" - 4:19
2. "The Swinging Chemise" (Duke Ellington) - 6:58
3. "My Heart Belongs to Daddy" (Cole Porter) - 3:13
4. "Blues for Etta" - 7:22
5. "Top 'n' Bottom" - 4:51
6. ""127"" - 8:06
7. "A Sunday Kind of Love" (Barbara Belle, Anita Leonard, Louis Prima, Stan Rhodes) - 3:24
8. "Mardi Gras Waltz" - 4:03

== Personnel ==
- Clark Terry - trumpet, flugelhorn
- Don Butterfield - tuba
- Jimmy Jones - piano
- Sam Jones - bass
- Art Taylor - drums
