= Ernie Shepard =

American jazz musician

Ernest Shepard, Jr. (July 19, 1916 in Beaumont, Texas – November 23, 1965 in Hamburg, West Germany) was an American jazz double-bassist and vocalist.

Shepard played in territory bands in Texas in the 1930s and soon after worked in California in the bands of Phil Moore and Gerald Wilson. For a short time he played in a quintet with Charlie Parker and Dizzy Gillespie in 1945; later that year he recorded as a vocalist with Lem Davis. He also worked with Eddie Heywood in 1945-1946. In the 1950s he worked with Slim Gaillard, Gene Ammons, Sonny Stitt, and Johnny Hodges, but played little in the latter half of the 1950s. In 1962 he became a member of Duke Ellington's band and accompanied him on tours of Europe through 1964; he also worked with Paul Gonsalves in 1963 and Johnny Hodges in 1964. He moved to Germany early in 1964 and took up work as a session musician for studio recordings, radio, and television.
