= The Happy Horns of Clark Terry =

Studio album by Clark Terry
- Released: 1964
- Recorded: March 13, 1964
- Studio: Van Gelder Studio, Englewood Cliffs, New Jersey
- Genre: Jazz
- Length: 39:09
- Label: Impulse!
- Producer: Bob Thiele

Clark Terry chronology
What Makes Sammy Swing (1964)	The Happy Horns of Clark Terry (1964)	Oscar Peterson Trio + One (1964)

The Happy Horns of Clark Terry is an album by American jazz trumpet and flugelhorn player Clark Terry featuring performances recorded in March 1964 for the Impulse! label. Reissued in 2012 to commemorate the 50th anniversary of Impulse! Records, it resurfaced with Terry's only other record for the label as a solo leader, It's What's Happenin'.

== Reception ==
The Allmusic review by Scott Yanow awarded the album 4 stars stating "This all-star CD has plenty of memorable moments... The lively music is quite enjoyable".

Professional ratings
Review scores
Source	Rating
Allmusic	4/5 stars

== Track listing ==
1. "Rockin' in Rhythm" (Harry Carney, Duke Ellington, Irving Mills) - 4:39
2. "In a Mist" (Bix Beiderbecke) - 4:08
3. "Return to Swahili" (Clark Terry) - 3:04
4. "Ellington Rides Again: a. Don't Get Around Much Anymore; b. Perdido; c. I'm Beginning to See the Light" (a. Ellington, b. Juan Tizol, c. Ellington, Johnny Hodges, Harry James, Don George) - 2:56
5. "Impulsive" (Hodges) - 4:40
6. "Do Nothin' Till You Hear from Me (Ellington, Bob Russell) - 3:37
7. "Jazz Conversations" (Buck Clayton, Bob Hammer) - 4:29
8. "High Towers" (Henri Woode) - 3:48
9. "Hammerhead Waltz" (Hammer) - 2:48

- Recorded at the Van Gelder Studio in Englewood Cliffs, New Jersey on March 13, 1964

== Personnel ==
- Clark Terry - trumpet, flugelhorn
- Phil Woods - alto saxophone, clarinet
- Ben Webster – tenor saxophone
- Roger Kellaway – piano
- Milt Hinton – bass
- Walter Perkins – drums
