= It's What's Happenin' =

Studio album by Clark Terry
- Released: 1967
- Recorded: July 24, 1967; New York
- Genre: Jazz
- Length: 35:50
- Label: Impulse!
- Producer: Bob Thiele

Clark Terry chronology
Spanish Rice (1966)	It's What's Happenin' (1967)	Music in the Garden (1968)

It's What's Happenin' (subtitled The Varitone Sound of Clark Terry) is an album by American jazz trumpeter Clark Terry featuring performances recorded in 1967 for the Impulse! label. Remastered in 2012 to commemorate the 50th anniversary of Impulse! Records, it was reissued together with Terry's only other record for the label as a solo leader, The Happy Horns of Clark Terry.

== Reception ==
The Allmusic review by Richard S. Ginell awarded the album 3 stars stating "Not many will bother to recall that Clark Terry was the first trumpeter to make a recording with Selmer's Varitone attachment -- an electronic hookup to an amplifier that allowed a horn player to play octaves. Though the instrument quickly fell out of favor after a very brief vogue, it still produced an attractively soulful sound that was a good fit with Terry's jaunty, slurry, note-bending manner... there is nothing unmusically sensational about anything that happens here.".

Professional ratings
Review scores
Source	Rating
Allmusic	3/5 stars

== Track listing ==
All compositions by Clark Terry except where noted.

1. "Electric Mumbles" - 3:51
2. "Secret Love" (Paul Francis Webster, Sammy Fain) - 6:15
3. "Take Me Back to Elkhart" - 7:11
4. "Take the "A" Train" (Billy Strayhorn) - 5:03
5. "Tee Pee Time" - 6:25
6. "Grand Canyon Suite" (Ferde Grofé) - 7:05

== Personnel ==
- Clark Terry - Varitone trumpet
- Don Friedman - piano
- George Duvivier - bass
- Dave Bailey - drums
