= In Orbit (Clark Terry album) =

Studio album by Clark Terry
- Released: 1958
- Recorded: May 7 & 12, 1958
- Genre: Jazz
- Length: 47:51 (Reissue)
- Label: Riverside
- Producer: Orrin Keepnews

Clark Terry chronology
Duke with a Difference (1957)	In Orbit (1958)	Top and Bottom Brass (1959)

Professional ratings
Review scores
Source	Rating
Allmusic	4.5/5 stars
The Penguin Guide to Jazz Recordings	4/4 stars

In Orbit is an album by jazz trumpeter Clark Terry, also featuring Thelonious Monk, which was recorded in New York in May of 1958. It was Monk's only Riverside appearance as sideman, the first of Terry's recordings on flugelhorn, and the first Riverside date with bassist Sam Jones. Monk introduced Riverside to some its most important artists, including Johnny Griffin, Wilbur Ware, Sonny Rollins, and Terry. The album features one Monk composition, "Let's Cool One."

According to biographer Robin D. G. Kelley, "the session took place over two days—May 7 and May 12. 'I was surprised when [Thelonious] agreed to do the gig with me,' Terry reflected. 'I thought he would probably say no, but he was happy to, and he was very easy to work with. He had his moments, but he was a beautiful person, and I loved him very much. I wrote most of the pieces for the session and when they reissued it some years later, they retitled one of my pieces' ... the uptempo 'In Orbit,' the title track Terry had initially called 'Globetrotter.' With the launching of Sputnik having occurred just a few months earlier, Orrin Keepnews and Bill Grauer, Jr. thought In Orbit had more market appeal."

== Track listing ==
1. "In Orbit" (Terry)
2. "One Foot in the Gutter (Terry)
3. "Trust In Me" (Wever, Schwartz, Ager)
4. "Let's Cool One" (Monk)
5. "Pea-Eye" (Terry)
6. "Argentia" (Terry)
7. "Moonlight Fiesta" (Mills, Tizol)
8. "Buck's Business" (Terry)
9. "Very Near Blue" (Sara Cassey)
10. "Flugelin' the Blues" (Terry), additional track not on original LP release.

== Personnel ==
- Clark Terry – flugelhorn
- Thelonious Monk – piano
- Sam Jones – bass
- Philly Joe Jones – drums
