= Amana Melome =

American singer and actress

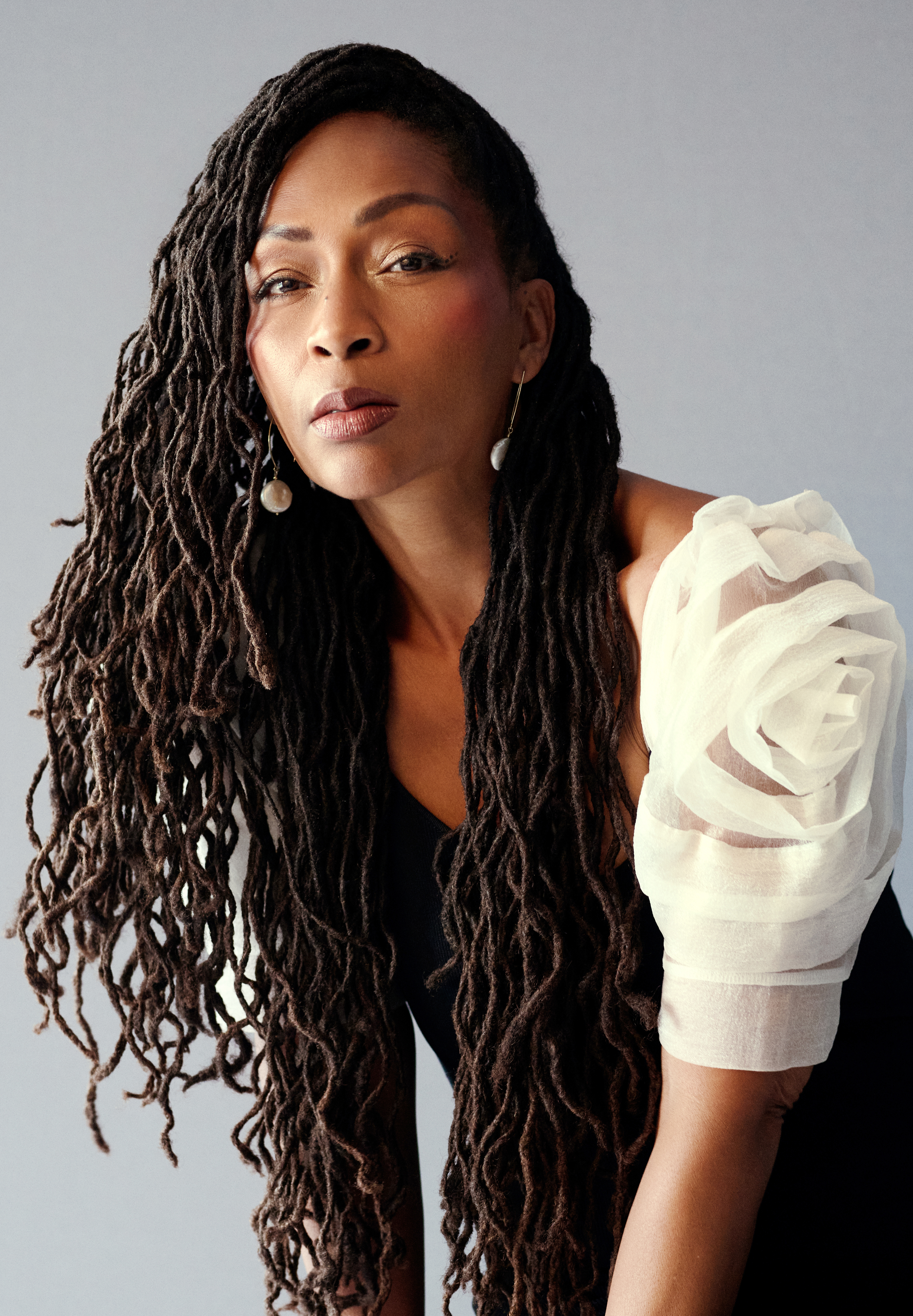
- Melome in 2025
- Born: Amana Melome Woode; Munich, Germany
- Occupations: Singer; songwriter; actress
- Years active: 2005–present
- Relatives: Jimmy Woode (grandfather)
- Musical career
- Genres: Jazz; Soul; World
- Instruments: Vocals
- Labels: Irma Records; Savana Records
- Website: amanamelome.com

Amana Melome is a Euro-Caribbean-American singer, songwriter, and actress who sings in Italian, French, Spanish, and English. She has performed at venues such as the Ferento Roman Theater and Sala Vanni and has collaborated, recorded, and performed with artists including Deron Johnson, Saverio Principini, Vinnie Colaiuta, John Beasley, and Reggie Hamilton, among others.

As an actress, she was a featured performer (as herself) in six episodes (season 6) on the Italian primetime sitcom, Un medico in famiglia.

== Early life ==
Amana Melome Woode was born in Germany but raised around the world. She grew up in a musical family and was greatly influenced by her grandfather Jimmy Woode, the youngest jazz musician (bass) in Duke Ellington's band as well as performing with Billie Holiday, Ella Fitzgerald and Miles Davis. Her late grandmother was also a jazz vocalist, and her aunt Shawnn Monteiro is still active in the jazz scene today. After finishing high school in Florence, Italy she returned to the US and received her college degree at NYU.

== Career ==
Melome moved to Los Angeles to pursue music after graduating, where she met Saverio "Sage" Principini and recorded her first album Indigo Red and her sophomoric album Phoenix Rising, both recorded at the infamous Henson Recording Studios in Hollywood. After a U.S. release on indie label Savana Records, Amana's Indigo Red became the first CD to be sold in Whole Foods Markets, as they coined her music as "organic" and had her perform a mini-tour of the west-coast stores. Indigo Red was released in Europe on Irma Records in 2008. Following the American and European release of her record, Melome was headlining festivals and clubs, performing for private events for Fendi and Christian Dior before she landed herself a lead role on the most popular Italian sitcom Un medico in famiglia which aired on national TV.

Melome's music is said to evoke the jazz roots of her family with a sound that is a mix of neo-soul, jazz and folk, occasionally mixed with world inspired by her many travels. She cites Nina Simone as a musical influence.

Melome released her third album Lock and Key in (2015) which received positive reviews. Recorded at Manifest Studios in Los Angeles, the album included new collaborations and production with duo Itai Shapira and Adam Berg of the Decoders.

In 2026, she released her fourth album, Recalibration, which received favorable reviews.

== Discography ==
- 2008: Indigo Red
- 2011: Phoenix Rising
- 2014: Lock and Key
- 2026: Recalibration

=== Singles ===
- 2008: Caterpillar, Bella Farfalla, Platonic
- 2011: Twisted
- 2014: Lock and Key
- 2025: Con C.ALMA
- 2026 - Recalibration
