= Ellingtonia Moods and Blues =

1960 studio album led by Paul Gonsalves

Studio album by Paul Gonsalves
- Released: 1960
- Recorded: February 29, 1960
- Genre: Jazz
- Length: 35.57
- Label: RCA Records
- Producer: ?

Paul Gonsalves chronology
Diminuendo, Crescendo and Blues (1958)	Ellingtonia Moods and Blues (1960)	Gettin' Together! (1960)

Ellingtonia Moods and Blues is an album recorded in 1960 led by Paul Gonsalves.

== Reception ==
Professional ratings
Review scores
Source	Rating
AllMusic	3/5 stars
The Penguin Guide to Jazz Recordings	3/4 stars
The Virgin Encyclopedia of Jazz	4/5 stars

In a review for AllMusic, Cub Koda called the album "one potent date", and wrote: "This is jazz from the days when albums were recorded in one day, and that was a good thing."

Jack Sohmer, writing for Jazz Times, stated: "Despite its brevity, this is an excellent and little-known session."

Pianist and composer Ethan Iverson commented: "The 'Ellington without Ellington' records are their own universe and I've never heard a bad one. I am keeping Ellingtonia Moods and Blues out and about in order to remember to keep listening to it. Gonsalves and Hodges know something particularly private and wonderful about playing the saxophone."

== Track listing ==
1. "It's Something That You Ought to Know"
2. "Chocataw"
3. "The Line-up"
4. "Way, Way Back"
5. "Day Dream"
6. "I'm Beginning to See the Light"
7. "D.A. Blues"

== Performers ==
- Paul Gonsalves - Tenor Saxophone
- Johnny Hodges - Alto Saxophone
- Booty Wood - Trombone
- Ray Nance - Trumpet
- Jimmy Jones - Piano
- Al Hall - Bass
- Oliver Jackson - drums
