= Humming Bird (Paul Gonsalves album) =

Studio album by Paul Gonsalves
- Released: 1970
- Recorded: 1970
- Genre: Jazz
- Length: 48:12
- Label: Deram
- Producer: Jack Sharpe

Paul Gonsalves chronology
| With the Swingers and the Four Bones (1970) | Humming Bird (1970) | Just A-Sittin' and A-Rockin (1970) |

Professional ratings
Review scores
| Source | Rating |
|---|---|
| The Penguin Guide to Jazz Recordings | 2.5/4 stars |

Humming Bird is an album by jazz saxophonist Paul Gonsalves that was released in the U.K. in 1970. The album was recorded in England with English jazz musicians Alan Branscombe, Stan Tracey, and David Horler, and Canadian trumpeter Kenny Wheeler.

== Track listing ==
1. "Humming Bird"
2. "Body and Soul"
3. "What Is There to Stay"
4. "It's the Talk of the Town"
5. "All The Things You Are"
6. "Sticks"
7. "X. O. X"
8. "In a Mellow Tone"
9. "Almost You"

== Personnel ==
- Paul Gonsalves – tenor saxophone
- Kenny Wheeler – trumpet
- David Horler – trombone
- Alan Branscombe – piano
- Stan Tracey – piano
- Dave Green – bass guitar
- Kenny Napper – bass guitar
- Benny Goodman – drums
