= In a Mellow Tone =

1940 composition by Duke Ellington

"In a Mellow Tone", also known as "In a Mellotone", is a 1940 jazz standard composed by Duke Ellington, with lyrics written later by Milt Gabler. The song's chord changes are based on the 1917 standard "Rose Room" by Art Hickman and Harry Williams, which Ellington had recorded in 1932.

Ellington and his orchestra made the original recording of "In a Mellotone" (with that styling) on September 5, 1940. It features solos by bassist Jimmy Blanton, trumpeter Cootie Williams, and alto saxophonist Johnny Hodges, who plays in double-time. The recording is collected on The Blanton–Webster Band compilation.

The version with lyrics and the better-known alternate title ("In a Mellow Tone") was first recorded by The Mills Brothers in 1955. The song has gone on to be recorded more than 400 times.

Howard Stern used a recording of this song from Ellington's 1960 Blues in Orbit album as the opening theme to The Howard Stern Show from 1987 to 1994.

== Other notable recordings ==
- Red Norvo (1943)
- Erroll Garner – Contrasts (1954)
- Ella Fitzgerald – Ella Fitzgerald Sings the Duke Ellington Songbook (1958)
- Ben Webster (with Coleman Hawkins and Roy Eldridge) – Ben Webster and Associates (1959)
- Count Basie – Breakfast Dance and Barbecue (1959)
- Coleman Hawkins with Eddie Lockjaw Davis – Night Hawk (1960)
- Louis Armstrong and Duke Ellington – The Great Summit (1961)
- Harry James – 1964 Live! In The Holiday Ballroom Chicago (Jazz Hour Compact Classics JH-1001, 1989)
- Oscar Peterson – Mellow Mood (1968)
- Paul Gonsalves – Humming Bird (1970)
- Buddy Rich – "Very Alive at Ronnie Scotts" (1971)
- Nick Brignola – L.A. Bound (1979)
- Art Pepper and George Cables – Goin’ Home (1982)
- Marcus Roberts – Plays Ellington (1995)
- Bob Wilber and Dick Hyman – A Perfect Match (1997)
- Tony Bennett – Bennett Sings Ellington: Hot & Cool (1999)
