= Sabby Lewis =

American jazz pianist and bandleader (1914–1994)

William Sebastian "Sabby" Lewis (November 1, 1914 in Middleburg, North Carolina – July 9, 1994) was an American jazz pianist, band leader, and arranger.

== Biography ==
Lewis was born in Middleburg, North Carolina, United States, but was raised in Philadelphia, Pennsylvania. He started taking piano lessons when he was five and moved to Boston, Massachusetts in 1932. After working with Tasker Crosson's Ten Statesmen in 1934, Lewis organized his own seven-piece band in 1936.

In the late 1930s and early 1940s, Sabby Lewis and his band were mainstays at notable Boston jazz venues such as the Roseland-State Ballroom, Egleston Square Gardens, and The Savoy Café.

In 1942, Lewis' band won a listener contest on a broadcast from the Statler Hotel's Terrace Room in Boston. The contest, sponsored by the F.W. Fitch Company, was to select a band to appear regularly on NBC's The Fitch Bandwagon, heard on 120 stations at the time.

Though Lewis did not tour frequently nor leave Boston often, he did perform on Broadway and in ballrooms and clubs in Manhattan such as Kelly's Stables, the Zanzibar and the Famous Door. He performed with Dinah Washington and Billy Eckstine. "I recall one night at the Famous Door when Count Basie checked out the band," Lewis said. "He stood just inside the door and listened and left without saying a word. The next night I received a telegram from the Count. It contained three words: Rock 'em, Pops."

During World War II, Lewis' orchestra included long-time Ellington tenor saxophonist Paul Gonsalves, and drummer Alan Dawson spent much of the 1950s in the band. Other notable alumni of the Lewis band included trumpeter Cat Anderson, Sonny Stitt, Roy Haynes, Al Morgan, Idrees Sulieman and Joe Gordon.

Lewis was seriously injured in an automobile accident in October 1962, an event which greatly curtailed his performing.

Lewis became Boston's first African-American disk jockey when he went to work at WBMS (later WILD) in the 1950s. Lewis received a proclamation from Massachusetts Governor Michael Dukakis in 1984. The special music citation celebrated his work and his place in the African-American history of Boston.

Lewis had second career as a housing investigator for the Massachusetts Commission Against Discrimination. A position from which he retired in 1984.
