= Serenade to a Bus Seat =

Studio album by Clark Terry Quintet
- Released: 1957
- Recorded: April 27, 1957; Reeves Sound Studios, New York City
- Genre: Jazz
- Length: 41:32
- Label: Riverside; RLP 12-237
- Producer: Orrin Keepnews

Clark Terry chronology
Clark Terry (1955)	Serenade to a Bus Seat (1957)	Out on a Limb with Clark Terry (1957)

Serenade to a Bus Seat is an album by American jazz trumpeter Clark Terry featuring tracks recorded in 1957 for the Riverside label.

== Reception ==
Professional ratings
Review scores
Source	Rating
Down Beat	3/5 stars
Allmusic	4/5 stars
The Penguin Guide to Jazz Recordings	3/4 stars

Allmusic awarded the album 4 stars stating "This set contains excellent straightahead jazz performed with plenty of spirit".

== Track listing ==
All compositions by Clark Terry except where noted

1. "Donna Lee" (Charlie Parker) - 4:04
2. "Boardwalk" - 7:01
3. "Boomerang" - 6:01
4. "Digits" - 4:08
5. "Serenade to a Bus Seat" - 4:37
6. "Stardust" (Hoagy Carmichael, Mitchell Parish) - 5:15
7. "Cruising" - 8:27
8. "That Old Black Magic" (Harold Arlen, Johnny Mercer) - 1:59

== Personnel ==
- Clark Terry - trumpet
- Johnny Griffin - tenor saxophone
- Wynton Kelly - piano
- Paul Chambers - bass
- Philly Joe Jones - drums
