= Enrique Villegas =

Argentinian pianist (1913–1986)

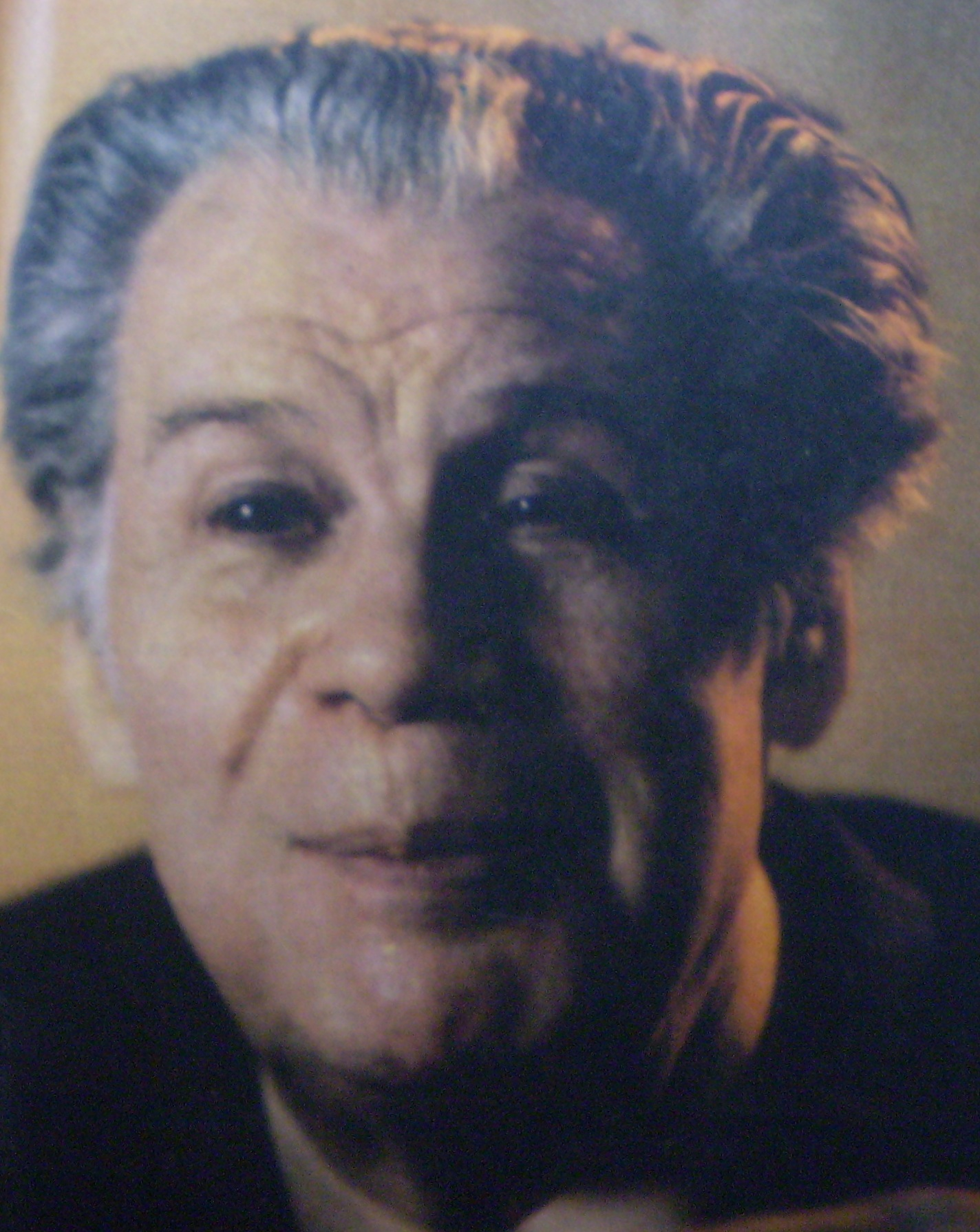
- Born: 3 August 1913; Buenos Aires, Argentina
- Died: 11 July 1986 (aged 72); Buenos Aires, Argentina
- Occupation: pianist

Enrique "Mono" Villegas (3 August 1913 – 11 July 1986) was an Argentine jazz pianist and composer.

== Life and career ==
Born in Buenos Aires into an aristocratic family, Villegas studied piano under the guidance of the composer Alberto Williams. Trained in classical music, he soon abandoned this genre to embrace jazz. He held his first concert at the Teatro Odeón at 19 years old, and performed his first composition, Jazzeta, in 1941. After forming some ensambles (notably the Santa Anita Sextet and Los Punteros) and collaborating to several recordings, he recorded the first album under his name in 1952.

In the mid-1950s he was put under contract by Columbia Records and moved to New York City; after two albums he decided to terminate the contract due to artistic disagreements with the label. He then toured extensively in Europe, United States and Latin America for eight years, before coming back in Buenos Aires where he formed two trio ensambles, first with Jorge López Ruiz and Eduardo Casalla, and then with Alfredo Remus and Néstor Astarita, and recorded several albums.

The first jazz pianist to perform at famed Teatro Colón, he died from complications due to a hip broken in a car accident.

== Discography ==
- Folklore + Villegas - 1952 (MUSIC-HALL - LD 70.237)
- Introducing Villegas - 1956 (Columbia, B-787)
- Very, Very, Villegas - 1957 (Columbia - CL-877)
- En cuerpo y alma - 1966 (Trova TL1 - RP music)
- Metamorfosis - Los 24 preludios de Chopin - 1967 (Trova TL8 - RP music)
- Tributo a Monk - 1967 (Trova TL12 - RP music)
- Porgy & Bess - 1968 (Trova TL 19 - RP music)
- Encuentro - Enrique Villegas / Paul Gonçalves / Willie Cook - 1968 (Trova TL22 - RP music)
- Baladas de amor - 1968 (Trova TL29 - RP music)
- 60 años 3-8-73 - 1973 (Trova XT80064 - RP music)
- Inspiración - 1975 (Cabal – LPL 9006)
- Tributo a Jerome Kern - 1977 (Aleluya Records 17000 - RP music)
