= Clark Terry =

American swing and bebop trumpeter (1920–2015)

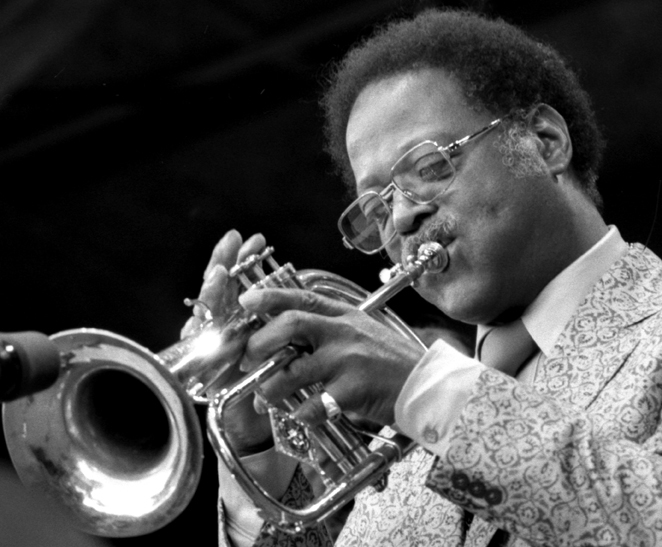
- Terry at the 1981 Monterey Jazz Festival

Background information
- Born: Clark Virgil Terry Jr. December 14, 1920; St. Louis, Missouri, U.S.
- Died: February 21, 2015 (aged 94) Pine Bluff, Arkansas, U.S.
- Genres: Jazz; swing; bebop; hard bop
- Occupations: Musician; composer
- Instruments: Trumpet; flugelhorn; vocals
- Years active: 1940s–2015
- Labels: Prestige; Pablo; Candid; Mainstream; Impulse!
- Formerly of: Charlie Barnet; Count Basie; Duke Ellington orchestra; Quincy Jones; Bob Brookmeyer; The Tonight Show Band; Oscar Peterson; The Newport Jazz All Stars; Jazz at the Philharmonic; Skitch Henderson's New York Pops Orchestra; Clark Terry's Big Bad Band; Clark Terry's Young Titans of Jazz
- Website: clarkterry.com

Clark Virgil Terry Jr. (December 14, 1920 – February 21, 2015) was an American jazz trumpeter, a pioneer of the flugelhorn in the genre, and a composer and educator.

Terry performed with Charlie Barnet (1947), Count Basie (1948–51), Duke Ellington (1951–59), Quincy Jones (1960), and Oscar Peterson (1964–96). He was with The Tonight Show Band on The Tonight Show from 1962 to 1972. His career in jazz spanned more than 70 years, during which he became one of the most recorded jazz musicians, appearing on over 900 recordings. Terry also mentored Quincy Jones, Miles Davis, Herbie Hancock, Wynton Marsalis, Pat Metheny, Dianne Reeves, and Terri Lyne Carrington.

== Early life ==
Terry was born to Clark Virgil Terry Sr. and Mary Terry in St. Louis, Missouri, on December 14, 1920. He attended Vashon High School and began his professional career in the early 1940s, playing in local clubs. He served as a bandsman in the United States Navy during World War II. His first instrument was the valve trombone.

== Big band era ==
Blending the St. Louis tone with contemporary styles, Terry's years with Basie and Ellington (who secretly recruited Terry away from Basie) in the late 1940s and 1950s established his prominence. During his period with Ellington, he took part in many of the composer's suites and acquired a reputation for his wide range of styles (from swing to hard bop), technical proficiency, and good humor. Terry influenced musicians including Miles Davis and Quincy Jones, both of whom acknowledged Terry's influence during the early stages of their careers. Terry had informally taught Davis while they were still in St. Louis, and Jones during Terry's frequent visits to Seattle with the Count Basie Sextet.

After leaving Ellington in 1959, Clark's international recognition soared when he accepted an offer from the National Broadcasting Company (NBC) to become a staff musician. He appeared for ten years on The Tonight Show as a member of the Tonight Show Band until 1972, first led by Skitch Henderson and later by Doc Severinsen, where his unique "mumbling" scat singing led to a hit with "Mumbles". Terry was the first African American to become a regular in a band on a major U.S. television network. He later said, "We had to be models, because I knew we were in a test. ... We couldn't have a speck on our trousers. We couldn't have a wrinkle in the clothes. We couldn't have a dirty shirt."

Clark has many relationships in the music world and they all speak highly of him. One of those relationships was Quincy Jones, who wrote the preface to Terry's autobiography. Jones led a band for the musical Free and Easy in 1959, and Terry left Duke Ellington's orchestra to join them in Belgium.

Terry continued to play with musicians such as trombonist J. J. Johnson and pianist Oscar Peterson, and led a group with valve-trombonist Bob Brookmeyer that achieved some success in the early 1960s. In February 1965, Brookmeyer and Terry appeared on BBC Two's Jazz 625. In 1967, presented by Norman Granz, he was recorded at Poplar Town Hall in the BBC series Jazz at the Philharmonic, alongside James Moody, Dizzy Gillespie, Coleman Hawkins, Benny Carter, Teddy Wilson, Bob Cranshaw, Louie Bellson, and T-Bone Walker.

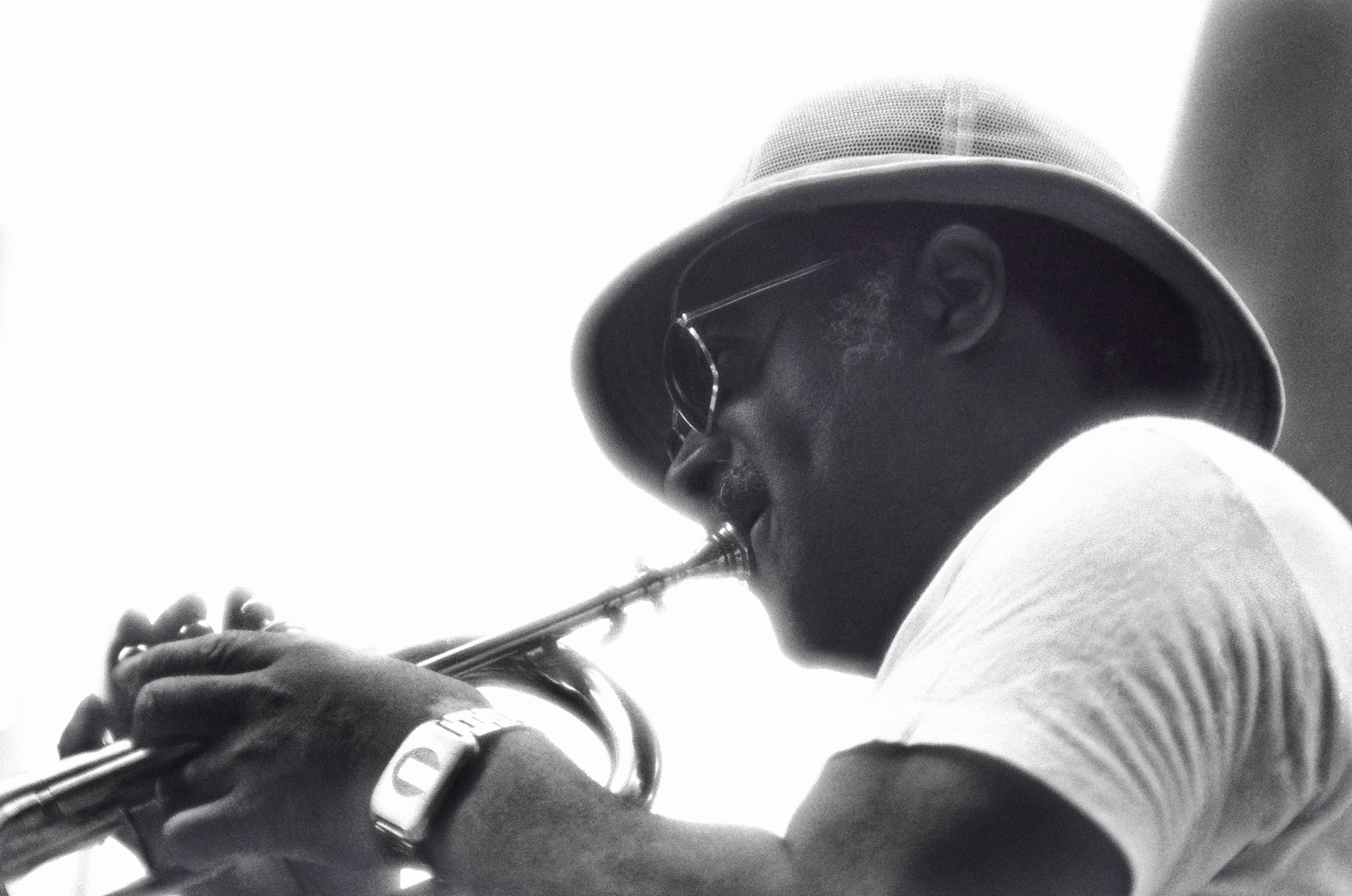
Terry in New York City, 1976

In the 1970s, Terry concentrated increasingly on the flugelhorn, which he played with a full, ringing tone. In addition to his studio work and teaching at jazz workshops, Terry toured regularly in the 1980s with small groups (including Peterson's) and performed as the leader of his Big B-A-D Band (formed around 1970). After financial difficulties forced him to break up the that band, he performed with bands such as the Unifour Jazz Ensemble. His humor and command of jazz trumpet styles are apparent in his "dialogues" with himself, on different instruments or on the same instrument, muted and unmuted.

== Later career ==
From the 1970s through the 1990s, Terry performed at Carnegie Hall, The Town Hall, and Lincoln Center, toured with the Newport Jazz All Stars and Jazz at the Philharmonic, and was featured with Skitch Henderson's New York Pops Orchestra. In 1998, Terry recorded George Gershwin's "Let's Call the Whole Thing Off" for the Red Hot Organization's compilation album Red Hot + Rhapsody, a tribute to Gershwin, which raised money for various charities devoted to increasing AIDS awareness and fighting the disease.

In November 1980, he was a headliner along with Anita O'Day, Lionel Hampton and Ramsey Lewis during the opening two-week ceremony performances celebrating the short-lived resurgence of the Blue Note Lounge at the Marriott O'Hare Hotel near Chicago.

Prompted early in his career by Billy Taylor, Terry and Milt Hinton bought instruments for and gave instruction to young hopefuls, which planted the seed that became Jazzmobile in Harlem. This venture tugged at Terry's greatest love: involving youth in the perpetuation of jazz. From 2000 onwards, he hosted Clark Terry Jazz Festivals on land and sea, held his own jazz camps, and appeared in more than fifty jazz festivals on six continents. Terry composed more than two hundred jazz songs and performed for eight U.S. Presidents.

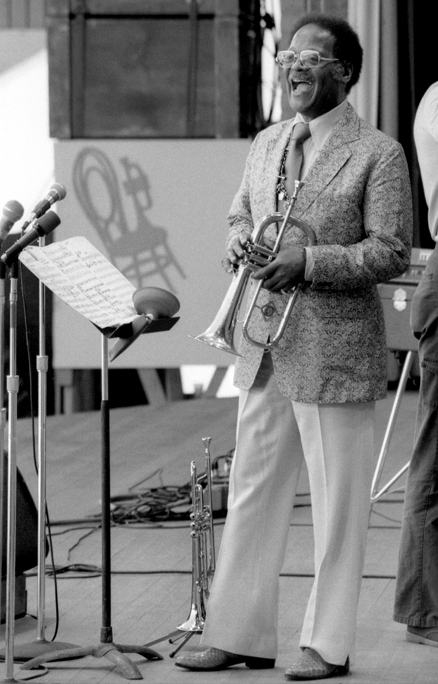
Terry at the 1981 Monterey Jazz Festival

He also had several recordings with major groups including the London Symphony Orchestra, the Dutch Metropole Orkest, and the Chicago Jazz Orchestra, hundreds of high school and college ensembles, his own duos, trios, quartets, quintets, sextets, octets, and two big bands: Clark Terry's Big Bad Band and Clark Terry's Young Titans of Jazz.

In February 2004, Terry guest starred as himself on Little Bill, a children's television series. Terry was a resident of Bayside, Queens, and Corona, Queens, New York, later moving to Haworth, New Jersey, and then Pine Bluff, Arkansas.

His autobiography was published in 2011. Taylor Ho Bynum wrote in The New Yorker that it "captures his gift for storytelling and his wry humor, especially in chronicling his early years on the road, with struggles through segregation and gigs in juke joints and carnivals, all while developing one of most distinctive improvisational voices in music history."

The Penguin Guide to Jazz Recordings notes that Terry appears on more of its listed recordings than any other artist. According to his own website, Terry was "one of the most recorded jazz artists in history and had performed for eight American Presidents." He was adept in the challenging technique of circular breathing, by which an instrumentalist can play for extended periods without stopping for breath, and in 1976 he published his Clark Terry's System of Circular Breathing for Woodwind and Brass Instruments.

In April 2014, the documentary Keep on Keepin' On, followed Terry over four years, to document his mentorship of the 23-year-old blind piano prodigy Justin Kauflin, as Kauflin prepared to compete in an elite, international competition.

In December 2014, the Jazz at Lincoln Center Orchestra with Wynton Marsalis and Cécile McLorin Salvant visited Terry, who had celebrated his 94th birthday on December 14, at the Jefferson Regional Medical Center. A lively rendition of "Happy Birthday" was played.

== Death and tributes ==
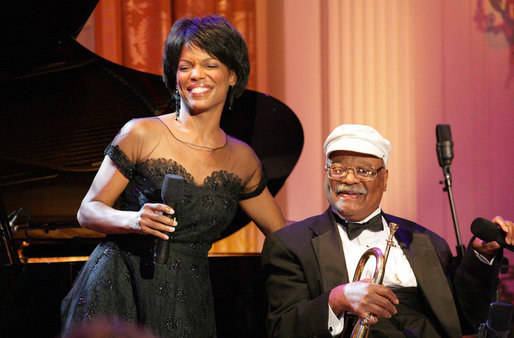
Terry performing at the White House with singer Nnenna Freelon in 2006

On February 13, 2015, it was announced that Terry had entered hospice care to manage his advanced diabetes. He died on February 21, 2015.

Writing in The New York Times, Peter Keepnews said Terry "was acclaimed for his impeccable musicianship, loved for his playful spirit and respected for his adaptability. Although his sound on both trumpet and the rounder-toned flugelhorn (which he helped popularize as a jazz instrument) was highly personal and easily identifiable, he managed to fit it snugly into a wide range of musical contexts."

Writing in UK's The Daily Telegraph, Martin Chilton said, "Terry was a music educator and had a deep and lasting influence on the course of jazz. Terry became a mentor to generations of jazz players, including Miles Davis, Wynton Marsalis and composer-arranger Quincy Jones."

Interviewing Terry in 2005, fellow jazz trumpeter Scotty Barnhart said he was "... one of the most incredibly versatile musicians to ever live ... a jazz trumpet master that played with the greatest names in the history of the music".

Southeast Missouri State University hosts the Clark Terry / Phi Mu Alpha Jazz Festival, an annual tribute to the musician. The festival began in 1998 and has grown in size every year. It showcases outstanding student musicians and guest artists at the university's River Campus.

The University of New Hampshire hosts the Clark Terry Jazz Festival every year; it showcases middle- and high-school jazz musicians from all over New England.

== Awards and honors ==
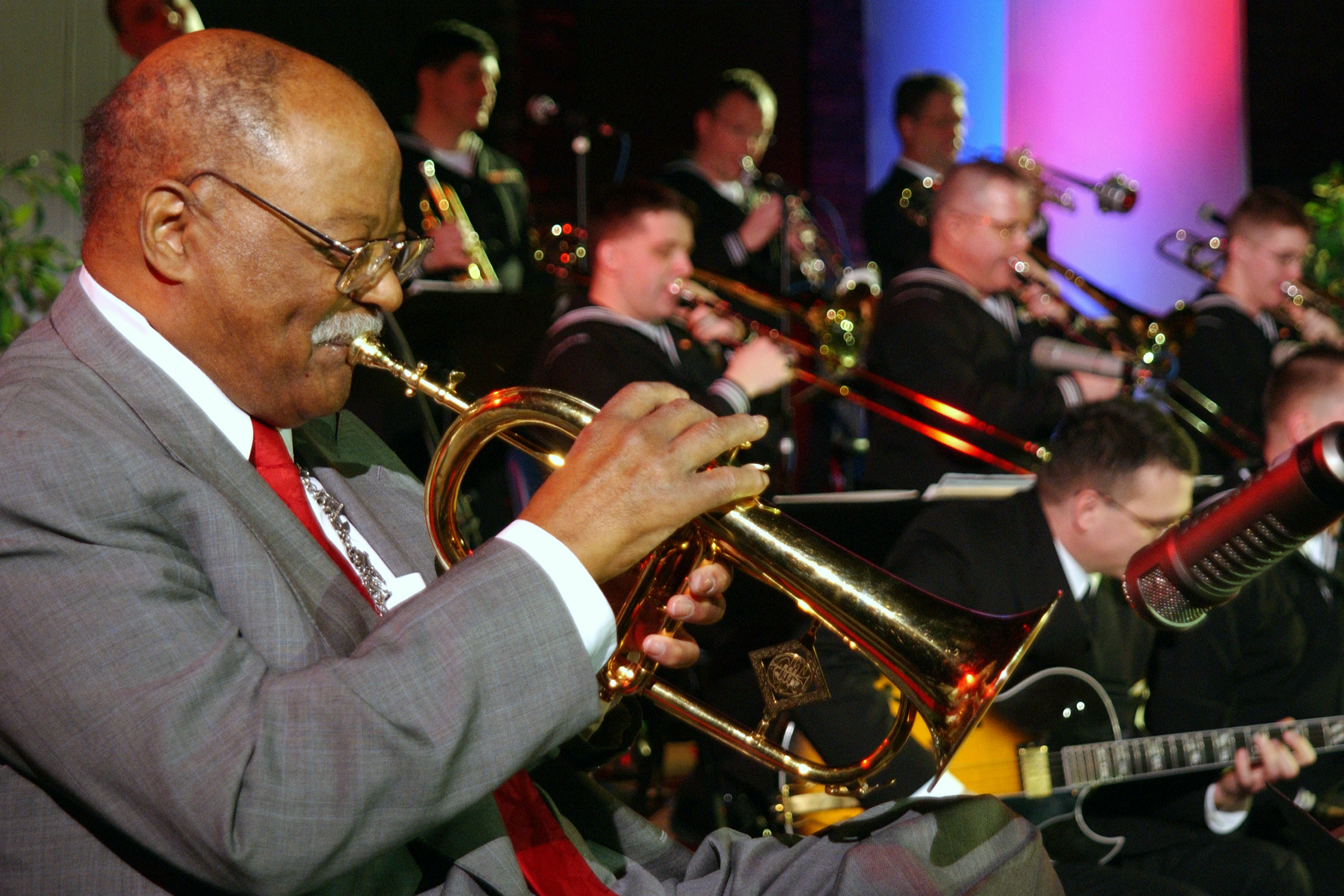
Terry performing with the Great Lakes Navy Band Jazz Ensemble

Over 250 awards, medals and honors, including:

- Induction into the Jazz at Lincoln Center Nesuhi Ertegun Jazz Hall of Fame (2013)
- 2010 Grammy Lifetime Achievement Award, two Grammy certificates, three Grammy-Award nominations
- Induction into the DownBeat Jazz Hall of Fame
- National Endowment for the Arts Jazz Master Award (1991)
- 1988 Honorary Doctorate of Music from Berklee College of Music
- Sixteen honorary doctorates
- Keys to several cities
- Jazz Ambassador for U.S. State Department tours in the Middle East and Africa
- A knighthood in Germany
- Charles E. Lutton Man of Music Award, presented by the Phi Mu Alpha Sinfonia fraternity in (1985). Terry was awarded honorary membership in the Fraternity by the Beta Zeta chapter at the College of Emporia (1968).
- An honorary member of the Iota Phi chapter of Kappa Kappa Psi, National Honorary Band Fraternity (2011), at the University of New Hampshire
- The French Order of Arts and Letters (2000)
- A life-sized wax figure for the Black World History Museum in St. Louis
- Inducted into the St. Louis Walk of Fame (1996)
- NARAS Present's Merit Award (2005)
- Trumpeter of the Year by the Jazz Journalists Association (2005)

== Discography ==
=== As leader/co-leader ===
- Clark Terry (EmArcy, 1955)
- The Jazz School with Joe Gordon, Paul Gonsalves (Wing, 1955)
- Serenade to a Bus Seat (Riverside, 1957)
- Duke with a Difference (Riverside, 1957)
- Out on a Limb with Clark Terry (Argo, 1958) – rec. 1957
- In Orbit with Thelonious Monk (Riverside, 1958)
- Top and Bottom Brass (Riverside, 1959)
- Color Changes (Candid, 1961) – rec. 1960
- Everything's Mellow (Prestige/Moodsville, 1961)
- Clark Terry Plays the Jazz Version of All American (Moodsville, 1962)
- Back in Bean's Bag (Columbia, 1963) – rec. 1962
- Tread Ye Lightly (Cameo, 1964)
- What Makes Sammy Swing (20th Century Fox, 1964)
- The Happy Horns of Clark Terry (Impulse!, 1964)
- Tonight with Bob Brookmeyer (Mainstream, 1965) – rec. 1964
- The Power of Positive Swinging with Bob Brookmeyer (Mainstream, 1965)
- Gingerbread Men with Bob Brookmeyer (Mainstream, 1966)
- Mumbles (Mainstream, 1966)
- Spanish Rice with Chico O'Farrill (Impulse!, 1966)
- It's What's Happenin' (Impulse!, 1967)
- Soul Duo with Shirley Scott (Impulse!, 1967)
- At the Montreux Jazz Festival (Polydor, 1970) – rec. 1969
- In Concert: Live (Etoile, 1973)
- Previously Unreleased Recordings with Bob Brookmeyer (Verve, 1974)
- Clark Terry's Big B-A-D Band Live at the Wichita Jazz Festival (Vanguard, 1975)
- Oscar Peterson and Clark Terry with Oscar Peterson (Pablo, 1975)
- Wham/Live at the Jazz House (MPS, 1976)
- Professor Jive (Inner City, 1976)
- The Globetrotter (Vanguard, 1977)
- Clark After Dark: The Ballad Artistry of Clark Terry (MPS, 1978)
- Ain't Misbehavin' (Pablo, 1979)
- Mother———! Mother———!! with Zoot Sims (Pablo, 1980) – rec. 1979
- Memories of Duke (Pablo, 1980)
- Yes, the Blues (Pablo, 1981)
- To Duke and Basie (Enja, 1986)
- Live 1964 (Emerald, 1987) – live rec. 1964
- Portraits (Chesky, 1989)
- Squeeze Me (Chiaroscuro, 1989)
- Having Fun (Delos, 1990)
- Live at the Village Gate (Chesky, 1991)
- Music in the Garden (Jazz Heritage, 1993)
- What a Wonderful World (Red Baron, 1993)
- Marian McPartland's Piano Jazz with Guest Clark Terry (Jazz Alliance, 1994)
- Mellow Moods (Prestige, 1994)
- Big Band Basie with Frank Wess (Reference, 1995)
- The Second Set: Recorded Live at the Village Gate (Chesky, 1995)
- Clark Terry with Peewee Claybrook and Swing Fever (D'Note, 1995)
- Live in Chicago Vol. 1 (Monad, 1995)
- Live in Chicago Vol. 2 (Monad, 1995)
- Top and Bottom (Chiaroscuro, 1995)
- Clark Terry Express (Reference, 1996)
- The Songs Ella & Louis Sang with Carol Sloane (Concord Jazz, 1997)
- One on One (Chesky, 2000)
- The Hymn (Candid, 2001) – live rec. 1993
- Live in Concert (Image, 2001)
- Friendship with Max Roach (Columbia, 2002)
- Live on QE2 (Chiaroscuro, 2002)
- George Gershwin's Porgy and Bess (Americana, 2004)
- Live at Marihans (Chiaroscuro, 2005)
- Louie and Clark Expedition 2 with Louie Bellson (Percussion Power, 2008)
- Carnegie Blues: The Music of Duke Ellington (Squatty Roo, 2015)

=== As sideman ===
With Gene Ammons

- 1961-62: Soul Summit Vol. 2 (Prestige, 1962)
- 1961-62: Late Hour Special (Prestige, 1964)
- 1960-62: Velvet Soul (Prestige, 1964)

With Dave Bailey

- One Foot in the Gutter (Epic, 1960)
- Gettin' Into Somethin' (Epic, 1961) – recorded in 1960

With Ray Bryant

- Gotta Travel On (Cadet, 1966)
- Lonesome Traveler (Cadet, 1966)

With Eddie "Lockjaw" Davis

- Trane Whistle (Prestige, 1960)
- Afro-Jaws (Riverside, 1961) – recorded in 1960

With Duke Ellington

- Ellington Uptown (Columbia, 1952) – recorded in 1947-51
- Premiered by Ellington (Capitol, 1953)
- Dance to the Duke! (Capitol, 1954) – recorded in 1953-54
- Ellington '55 (Capitol, 1955) – recorded in 1953-54
- Ellington Showcase (Capitol, 1955) – recorded in 1953-55
- Blue Rose (Columbia, 1956)
- A Drum Is a Woman (Columbia, 1956)
- Ellington at Newport (Columbia, 1956)
- Such Sweet Thunder (Columbia, 1957)
- Ella Fitzgerald Sings the Duke Ellington Song Book (Verve, 1957)
- All Star Road Band (Doctor Jazz, 1983) – recorded in 1957
- Ellington Indigos (Columbia, 1958) – recorded in 1957
- Black, Brown and Beige (Columbia, 1958)
- Duke Ellington at the Bal Masque (Columbia, 1958)
- The Cosmic Scene (Columbia, 1958)
- Festival Session (Columbia, 1959)
- The Ellington Suites (Columbia, 1976) – recorded in 1959-72
- Blues in Orbit (Columbia, 1960) – recorded in 1958-59
- The Greatest Jazz Concert in the World (Columbia, 1975) – recorded in 1967

With Stan Getz

- Big Band Bossa Nova (Verve, 1962)
- Stan Getz Plays Music from the Soundtrack of Mickey One (MGM, 1965)

With Dizzy Gillespie

- Gillespiana (Verve, 1960)
- Carnegie Hall Concert (Verve, 1961)
- The Trumpet Kings Meet Joe Turner (Pablo, 1974)
- The Trumpet Summit Meets the Oscar Peterson Big 4 (Pablo, 1980)

With Johnny Griffin

- The Big Soul-Band (Riverside, 1960)
- White Gardenia (Riverside, 1961)

With Johnny Hodges

- Creamy (Norgran, 1955)
- Ellingtonia '56 (Norgran, 1956)
- Duke's in Bed (Verve, 1956)
- The Big Sound (Verve, 1957)

With Milt Jackson

- Big Bags (Riverside, 1962)
- For Someone I Love (Riverside, 1963)
- Ray Brown / Milt Jackson with Ray Brown (Verve, 1965)

With J. J. Johnson

- J.J.! (RCA Victor, 1964)
- Goodies (RCA Victor, 1965)
- Concepts in Blue (Pablo Today, 1981) – recorded in 1980

With Quincy Jones

- The Birth of a Band! (Mercury, 1959)
- I Dig Dancers (Mercury, 1961) – recorded in 1960
- The Quintessence (Impulse! 1962) – recorded in 1961
- Big Band Bossa Nova (Mercury, 1962)
- Quincy Jones Plays Hip Hits (Mercury, 1963) – recorded in 1962–63
- Quincy Jones Explores the Music of Henry Mancini (Mercury, 1964)
- Quincy Plays for Pussycats (Mercury, 1965) – recorded in 1959–65
- The Hot Rock OST (Prophesy, 1972) – recorded in 1971

With Mundell Lowe

- Themes from Mr. Lucky, The Untouchables and Other TV Action Jazz (RCA Camden, 1960)
- Satan in High Heels (soundtrack) (Charlie Parker, 1961)

With Herbie Mann

- Latin Fever (Atlantic, 1964) – recorded in 1962-64
- My Kinda Groove (Atlantic, 1965) – recorded in 1964
- Our Mann Flute (Atlantic, 1966)
- The Beat Goes On (Atlantic, 1967)
- The Herbie Mann String Album (Atlantic, 1967)

With Gary McFarland

- The Jazz Version of "How to Succeed in Business without Really Trying" (Verve, 1962) – recorded in 1961
- Tijuana Jazz (Impulse!, 1965)

With Charles Mingus

- Mingus Revisited/ (Mercury/Limelight, 1961) – recorded in 1960
- The Complete Town Hall Concert (Blue Note, 1994) – recorded in 1962

With Blue Mitchell

- Smooth as the Wind (Riverside, 1961) – recorded in 1960-61
- A Sure Thing (Riverside, 1962)

With Gerry Mulligan

- Gerry Mulligan and the Concert Jazz Band at the Village Vanguard (Verve, 1961) – recorded in 1960
- Gerry Mulligan '63 (Verve, 1963) – recorded in 1962

With Oliver Nelson

- Impressions of Phaedra (United Artists, 1962)
- Full Nelson (Verve, 1963) – recorded in 1962-63
- Oliver Nelson Plays Michelle (Impulse!, 1966)
- Happenings (Impulse!, 1966)
- Encyclopedia of Jazz (Verve, 1967) – recorded in 1965-66
- The Spirit of '67 (Impulse!, 1967)
- The Sound of Feeling (Verve, 1968) – recorded in 1966-67

With Oscar Peterson

- Oscar Peterson Trio + One (Verve, 1964)
- Jousts (Pablo, 1975) – recorded in 1974-75
- The Trumpet Summit Meets the Oscar Peterson Big 4 (Pablo, 1980)
- Jazz at the Philharmonic – Yoyogi National Stadium, Tokyo 1983: Return to Happiness (Pablo, 1983)

With Dave Pike

- Bossa Nova Carnival (New Jazz, 1962)
- Jazz for the Jet Set (Atlantic, 1966) – recorded in 1965

With Lalo Schifrin

- New Fantasy (Verve, 1964)
- Once a Thief and Other Themes (Verve, 1965)

With Sonny Stitt

- The Matadors Meet the Bull (Roulette, 1965)
- I Keep Comin' Back! (Roulette, 1966)

With Billy Taylor

- Taylor Made Jazz (Argo, 1959) – recorded in 1957
- Kwamina (Mercury, 1961)

With Cal Tjader

- Several Shades of Jade (Verve, 1963)
- Live at the Monterey Jazz Festival 1958–1980 (Concord, 2008)

With others

- Ernestine Anderson, My Kinda Swing (Mercury, 1961) – recorded in 1960
- George Barnes, Guitars Galore (Mercury, 1961)
- Joe Cain (arranger), Latin Au Go Go (Mainstream, 1965)
- George Benson, Goodies (Verve, 1968)
- Willie Bobo, Bobo's Beat (Roulette, 1963) – recorded in 1962
- Bob Brookmeyer, Gloomy Sunday and Other Bright Moments (Verve, 1961)
- Clifford Brown, Jam Session (EmArcy, 1954)
- Ruth Brown, Ruth Brown '65 (Mainstream, 1965)
- Kenny Burrell, Lotsa Bossa Nova (Kapp, 1963)
- Gary Burton, Who Is Gary Burton? (RCA, 1962)
- Charlie Byrd, Byrd at the Gate (Riverside, 1963)
- Al Caiola, Cleopatra and All That Jazz (United Artists, 1963)
- Al Cohn, Son of Drum Suite (RCA Victor, 1960)
- Tadd Dameron, The Magic Touch (1962)
- Dorothy Donegan, Live at the Floating Jazz Festival (Chiaroscuro, 1992)
- Art Farmer, Listen to Art Farmer and the Orchestra (Mercury, 1962)
- Ella Fitzgerald, Ella Abraça Jobim (Pablo, 1981)
- Paul Gonsalves, Cookin' (Argo, 1957)
- Bunky Green, Transformations (Vanguard, 1977)
- Dave Grusin, Homage to Duke (1993)
- Chico Hamilton, The Further Adventures of El Chico (Impulse!, 1966)
- Jimmy Hamilton, It's About Time (Swingville, 1961)
- Lionel Hampton, You Better Know It!!! (Impulse!, 1965)
- Jimmy Heath, Really Big! (Riverside, 1960)
- John Hicks, Friends Old and New (Novus, 1992)
- Milt Hinton, Old Man Time (Chiaroscuro, 2002)
- Kenyon Hopkins, The Yellow Canary (Verve, 1960)
- Budd Johnson, Budd Johnson and the Four Brass Giants (Riverside, 1960)
- Elvin Jones, Summit Meeting (Vanguard, 1977) – recorded in 1976
- Sam Jones, Down Home (Riverside, 1962)
- Lambert, Hendricks & Bavan, At Newport '63 (RCA, 1963)
- Yusef Lateef, The Centaur and the Phoenix (Riverside, 1960)
- Michel Legrand, Michel Legrand Plays Richard Rodgers (Philips, 1962)
- Abbey Lincoln, The World Is Falling Down (Polydor/Verve, 1990)
- Junior Mance, The Soul of Hollywood (Jazzland, 1962)
- Jay McShann, Some Blues (Chiaroscuro, 1993)
- Modern Jazz Quartet, Jazz Dialogue (Atlantic, 1965)
- Mark Murphy, That's How I Love the Blues! (Riverside, 1962)
- Chico O'Farrill, Nine Flags (Impulse!, 1966)
- Oscar Pettiford, Basically Duke (Bethlehem, 1954)
- Flip Phillips, The Claw (Chiaroscuro, 1986)
- Hugh Ragin, Fanfare & Fiesta (Justin Time, 2001)
- Gene Roland, Swingin' Friends (Brunswick, 1963)
- Sonny Rollins, Sonny Rollins and the Big Brass (1958)
- Jimmy Rushing, Every Day I Have the Blues (BluesWay, 1967)
- Jimmy Smith, Hobo Flats (Verve, 1963)
- Buddy Tate, Tate-a-Tate (Swingville, 1960)
- Cecil Taylor, New York City R&B (Candid, 1961)
- Ed Thigpen, Out of the Storm (Verve, 1966)
- Teri Thornton, Devil May Care (Riverside, 1961)
- Stanley Turrentine, Joyride (Blue Note, 1965)
- McCoy Tyner, Live at Newport (Impulse, 1964) – live recorded in 1963
- Dinah Washington, Dinah Jams (EmArcy, 1955) – live recorded in 1954
- Randy Weston, Uhuru Afrika (Roulette, 1961) – recorded in 1960
- Joe Williams, At Newport '63 (RCA, 1963) – live
- Gerald Wilson, New York, New Sound (Mack Avenue, 2003)
- Kai Winding, Kai Olé (Verve, 1961)
- Jimmy Woode, The Colorful Strings of Jimmy Woode (Argo, 1958) – recorded in 1957

== Bibliography ==
- Let's Talk Trumpet: From Legit to Jazz (with Phil Rizzo), 1973
- Clark Terry's System of Circular Breathing for Woodwind and Brass Instruments (with Phil Rizzo), 1975
- Interpretation of the Jazz Language, Bedford, Ohio: M. A. S. Publishing Company, 1977
- TerryTunes, anthology of 60 original compositions (1st edn, 1972; 2nd edn w/doodle-tonguing chapter, 2009)
- "Clark Terry – Jazz Ambassador: C.T.'s Diary" [cover portrait], Jazz Journal International 31 (May 6, 1978): pp. 7–8.
- "Jazz for the Record" [Clark Terry Archive at William Paterson University], The New York Times (December 11, 2004).
- Beach, Doug, "Clark Terry and the St. Louis Trumpet Sound", Instrumentalist 45 (April 1991): 8–12.
- Bernotas, Bob, "Clark Terry", Jazz Player 1 (October–November 1994): 12–19.
- Blumenthal, Bob, "Reflections on a Brilliant Career" [reprint of JazzTimes 25, No. 8], Jazz Educators Journal 29, No. 4 (1997): 30–33, 36–37.
- Ellington, Duke, "Clark Terry" chapter in Music is My Mistress (Garden City, NY: Doubleday, 1973): 229–230.
- LaBarbera, John, "Clark Terry: More Than 'Mumbles'", ITG Journal (International Trumpet Guild) 19, No. 2 (1994): 36–41.
- Morgenstern, Dan, "Clark Terry" in Living With Jazz: A Reader (New York: Pantheon, 2004): 196–201. [Reprint of Down Beat 34 (June 1, 1967): 16–18.]
- Owens, Thomas, "Trumpeters: Clark Terry", in Bebop: The Music and the Players (New York: Oxford, 1995): 111–113.
- Terry, C. Clark: The Autobiography of Clark Terry, University of California Press (2011), ISBN 978-0520268463
