= Rick Henderson =

American jazz saxophonist and arranger (1928–2004)

Richard Andrew Henderson (April 25, 1928 – May 21, 2004) was an American jazz alto saxophonist and arranger.

== Biography ==
Born in Washington, D.C., Henderson studied composition as a high schooler and played in the late 1940s locally. He served in the Army from 1951 to 1953, then joined Duke Ellington's Orchestra after being recommended by Clark Terry. He played with Ellington during the years he was contracted to Capitol Records, creating arrangements in addition to his duties as a player; he also composed tunes such as "Carney" for the band. He left the orchestra after about five years at a time Ellington was reappraising his approach, though he continued to appear irregularly with Ellington until late 1957. Henderson returned to Washington, where he led the Howard Theatre's house band until 1964. Following this, he worked as an arranger and composer for jazz orchestras as well as military bands and school ensembles. Among those who used Henderson's charts, in addition to Ellington, were Count Basie, Illinois Jacquet, and Billy Taylor. Henderson continued to lead bands into the 1990s, including the University of Maryland Jazz Ensemble from 1977 to 1978. He died of arteriosclerotic cardiovascular disease in 2004.

== See also ==
- List of jazz arrangers
