= Willie Cook =

American jazz trumpeter (1923–2000)

Willie Cook (November 11, 1923 – September 22, 2000) was an American jazz trumpeter.

Cook was born in Tangipahoa, Louisiana, on November 11, 1923. He grew up in Chicago and learned to play violin before settling on trumpet as a teenager. He joined King Perry's band in the late 1930s, then joined Jay McShann's band early in the 1940s. His later credits include performing and recording with Johnny Hartman, Earl Hines, Jimmie Lunceford, Ella Fitzgerald, Dizzy Gillespie, Duke Ellington, B.B. King, and Count Basie. He joined Ellington's band in October 1951 as lead trumpeter and stayed for a decade. He moved to Sweden in 1982 after spending time in the country touring. He died of heart failure in Maria Regina Hospice in Stockholm on September 22, 2000.

== Discography ==
With The Young Swedes

- Christl Mood (Phontastic, 1985)

With Nappy Brown

- Roots of Scandinavian Blues (Hot Club, 1983)

With Count Basie

- Kansas City 6 (Pablo Records, 1982)

With Duke Ellington

- Ellington '55 (Capitol, 1999)
- Blue Rose (Columbia, 1956)
- All Star Road Band (Doctor Jazz, 1957 [1983])
- Hot Summer Dance (Red Baron, 1960 [1991])

With Dizzy Gillespie

- The Complete RCA Victor Recordings (Bluebird, 1937–1949, [1995])

With Gugge Hedrenius Big Blues Band

- Swings Again, Live!!! (Scranta, 1999)

With Johnny Hodges

- Ellingtonia '56 (Norgran, 1956)
- The Big Sound (Verve, 1957)

With Billy Taylor

- Taylor Made Jazz (Argo, 1959)

With Paul Gonsalves and Enrique Villegas

- Encuentro (1968)
