= Jimmy Woode =

American jazz bassist (1926–2005)

Background information
- Born: James Bryant Woode; September 23, 1926; Philadelphia, Pennsylvania, U.S.
- Died: April 23, 2005 (aged 78) Lindenwold, New Jersey, U.S.
- Genre: Jazz
- Occupations: Musician; composer
- Instrument: Double bass
- Years active: 1946–2005
- Label: Argo
- Formerly of: Duke Ellington; Kenny Clarke/Francy Boland Big Band; Lionel Hampton
- Education: Boston University; Boston Conservatory of Music; Philadelphia Academy of Music
- Relatives: Amana Melome (granddaughter)

James Bryant Woode (September 23, 1926 – April 23, 2005) was an American jazz bassist. He played and/or recorded in bands with Flip Phillips, Sarah Vaughan, Ella Fitzgerald, Charlie Parker, Duke Ellington, Coleman Hawkins, Nat Pierce, Sidney Bechet, Billie Holiday, Jaki Byard, Earl Hines, Jimmy Witherspoon, Mal Waldron, Clark Terry, and Miles Davis. His granddaughter is the singer and composer Amana Melome.

== Biography ==
Woode was born September 23, 1926, in Philadelphia, Pennsylvania. (Note: Woode shares a birth date with the jazz saxophonist John Coltrane (September 23, 1926 – July 17, 1967).) His father, Jimmy Woode Sr., was a music teacher and pianist who had played with Hot Lips Page. The younger Woode studied piano and bass in Boston at Boston University and at the Conservatory of Music, as well as at the Philadelphia Academy.

He joined the Duke Ellington orchestra in 1955, appearing on many of Ellington's recordings, including Such Sweet Thunder and Ella Fitzgerald Sings the Duke Ellington Song Book, both from 1957, as well as the performance at the 1956 Newport Jazz Festival issued as Ellington at Newport.

Ellington stated, "I was born at the Newport Jazz Festival on 7 July 1956", referencing Woode's unique bass playing style and the effect that it had on the audience. The next morning, music critics wrote positive reviews about Ellington and Woode's performance, with one saying "The audience broiled with enthusiasm. Within an hour, critics and reporters were buzzing about." He stayed with the orchestra until 1960, when he left to live in Europe.

Woode's song "Just Give Me Time" was covered by Carola in 1966, first released on her album Carola & Heikki Sarmanto Trio, reaching the Finnish charts in 2004.

An original member of the Kenny Clarke/Francy Boland Big Band, in 1995 he also toured with Lionel Hampton's Golden Men of Jazz.

In 2003, Woode formed a trio with drummer Pete York and German jazz musician/comedian Helge Schneider, touring in Germany with his interpretation of jazz classics such as "Georgia" and "Summertime". As a consequence of his co-operation with Schneider, he also starred in the feature film Jazzclub (2004), in the role of Steinberg, a struggling jazz bassist.

Woode died on April 23, 2005, at age 78, at his home in Lindenwold, New Jersey, of complications following a surgery for a stomach aneurysm.

== Discography ==
=== As leader ===
- The Colorful Strings of Jimmy Woode (Argo, 1957 [1958])

=== As sideman ===
With (groups led by) Don Byas, Albert Nicholas, Bud Powell, and Idrees Sulieman

- Americans in Europe (Impulse!, 1963)

With Kenny Clarke

- The Golden 8 (Blue Note, 1961)

With the Kenny Clarke/Francy Boland Big Band

- Jazz Is Universal (Atlantic, 1961 [1962])
- Handle with Care (Atlantic, 1963)
- Now Hear Our Meanin' (Columbia, 1963 [1965])
- Swing, Waltz, Swing (Philips, 1966)
- Sax No End (SABA, 1967)
- Out of the Folk Bag (Columbia, 1967)
- 17 Men and Their Music (Campi, 1967 [1968])
- All Smiles (MPS, 1968)
- Faces (MPS, 1968 [1969])
- Latin Kaleidoscope (MPS, 1968)
- All Blues (MPS, 1969 [1971])
- More Smiles (MPS, 1969)
- Clarke Boland Big Band en Concert avec Europe 1 (Tréma, 1969 [1992])
- Off Limits (Polydor, 1970 [1971])
- November Girl (Black Lion, 1970 [1975]) – with Carmen McRae

With Ted Curson

- Urge (Fontana, 1966)

With Eddie "Lockjaw" Davis and Johnny Griffin

- Tough Tenors Again 'n' Again (MPS, 1970)

With Nathan Davis

- The Hip Walk (1965)
- Peace Treaty (1965)
- Happy Girl (1965)

With Eric Dolphy

- Stockholm Sessions (Enja, 1961 [1981])

With Duke Ellington

- Blue Rose (Columbia, 1956) – with Rosemary Clooney
- Blues in Orbit (Columbia, 1958–59 [1960])

With Art Farmer

- Gentle Eyes (Mainstream, 1972)

With Erich Kleinschuster (Sextett)

- Live (Preiser, 1973)

With Paul Gonsalves

- Cookin' (Argo, 1957)

With Johnny Griffin

- Night Lady (Philips, 1964)

With Jim Hall

- It's Nice to Be With You (MPS, 1969)

With the Hampton Hawes Trio

- Blues for Bud (Black Lion, 1968)

With Johnny Hodges

- Creamy (Norgran, 1955)
- Ellingtonia '56 (Norgran, 1956)
- Duke's in Bed (Verve, 1956 [1957])
- The Big Sound (Verve, 1957)
- Blues A-Plenty (Verve, 1958)
- Not So Dukish (Verve, 1958)

With John Lewis and Svend Asmussen

- European Encounter (Atlantic, 1962)

With Mark Murphy

- Midnight Mood (MPS, 1967 [1968])

With Mythologie

- Live at »Domicile« Munich (BASF, 1971)

With Sahib Shihab

- Summer Dawn (Argo, 1963 [1964])
- Seeds (Vogue Schallplatten, 1968 [1969])
- Companionship (Vogue Schallplatten, 1964–70 [1971])
- Commitment (1970)

With Sunbirds

- Sunbirds (BASF, 1971)
- Zagara (Polydor/Finger, 1973)

With Clark Terry

- Out on a Limb with Clark Terry (Argo, 1957)

With Mal Waldron

- Black Glory (Enja, 1971)
- Mal Waldron Plays the Blues (Enja, 1971)
- A Touch of the Blues (Enja, 1972 [1975])
- One-Upmanship (Enja, 1977)
