= Paul Gonsalves =

American jazz saxophonist (1920–1974)

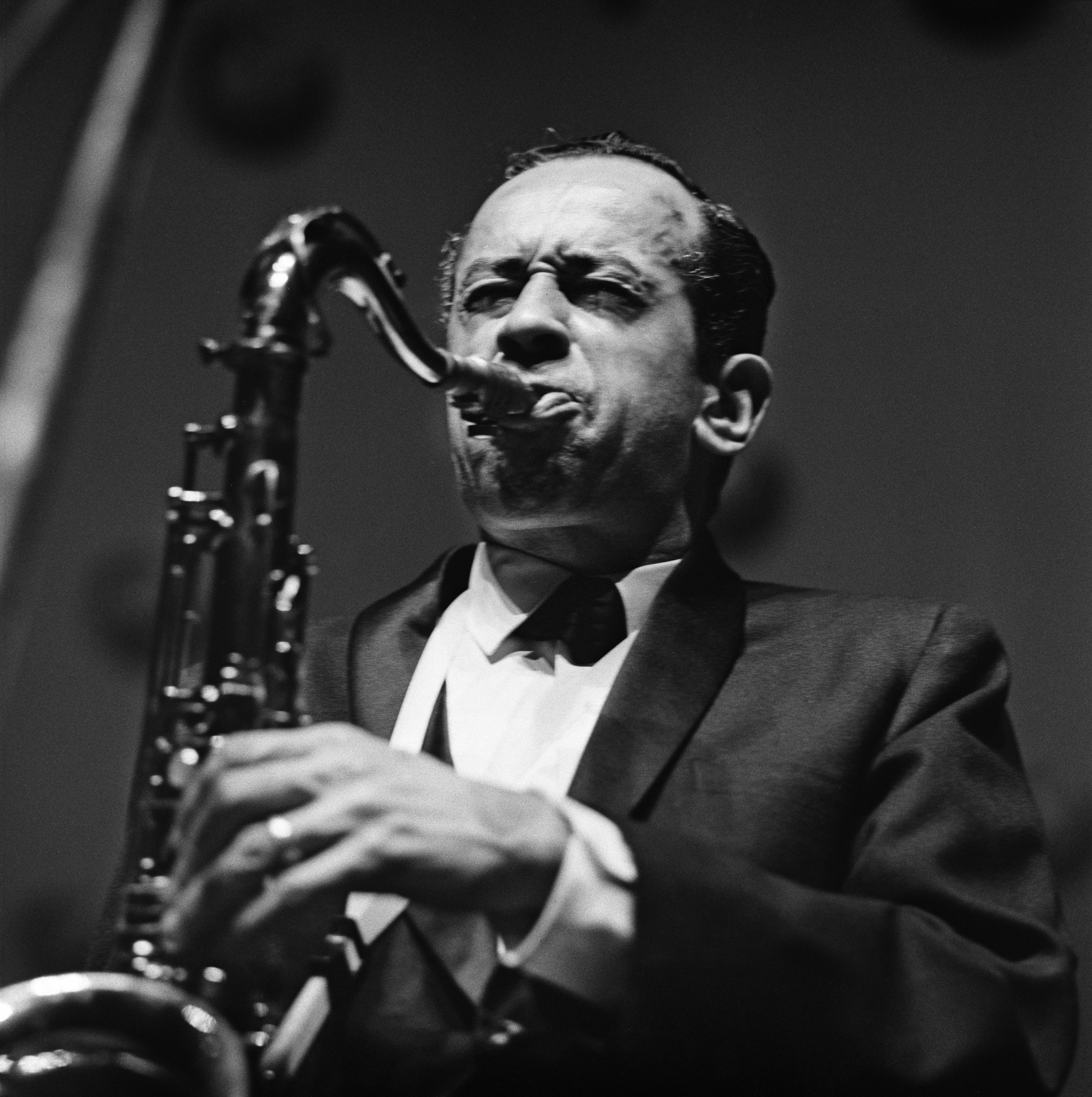
- Gonsalves in Helsinki, 1963

Background information
- Born: July 12, 1920; Brockton, Massachusetts, U.S.
- Died: May 15, 1974 (aged 53) London, England
- Genres: Jazz; swing; bebop
- Occupation: Musician
- Instrument: Tenor saxophone
- Years active: 1938–1974
- Labels: RCA Victor; Impulse!; Riviera; Black Lion
- Formerly of: Sabby Lewis; Count Basie Orchestra; Dizzy Gillespie; Duke Ellington

Paul Gonsalves (/ɡɑːnˈzæl.vɪs/ gon-ZAHL-vuhs; July 12, 1920 – May 15, 1974) was an American jazz tenor saxophonist best known for his association with Duke Ellington. At the 1956 Newport Jazz Festival, Gonsalves played a 27-chorus solo in the middle of Ellington's "Diminuendo and Crescendo in Blue", a performance credited with revitalizing Ellington's waning career in the 1950s.

== Biography ==
Gonsalves was born in Brockton, Massachusetts, to Portuguese–Cape Verdean parents. His first instrument was the guitar, and as a child, he was regularly asked to play Cape Verdean folk songs for his family. He grew up in New Bedford, Massachusetts, and played as a member of the Sabby Lewis Orchestra. His first professional engagement in Boston was with the same group on tenor saxophone, in which he played before and after his military service during World War II. He also played with fellow Cape Verdean Americans in Phil Edmund's band in the 1940s. Before joining Duke Ellington's orchestra in 1950, Gonsalves also played in big bands led by Count Basie (1947–1949) and Dizzy Gillespie (1949–1950).

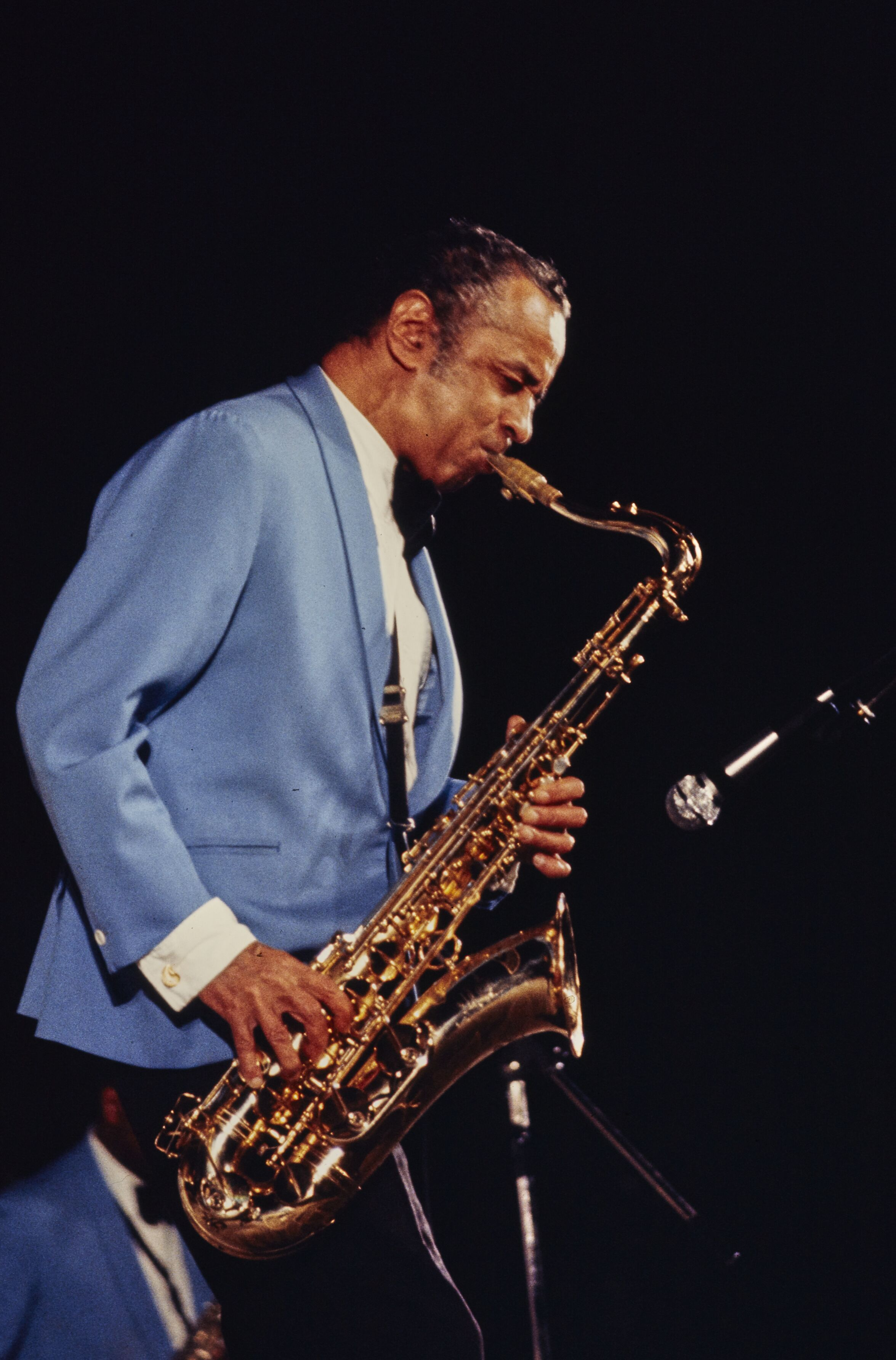
Gonsalves in concert with Ellington in Avignon, France, c. 1970s

At the 1956 Newport Jazz Festival, Gonsalves played a solo in Ellington's "Diminuendo and Crescendo in Blue" that went through 27 choruses; the publicity from this performance is credited with reviving Ellington's career. The performance is captured on the album Ellington at Newport. Gonsalves was a featured soloist in numerous Ellingtonian settings. He received the nickname "The Strolling Violins" from Ellington for playing solos while walking through the crowd.

Gonsalves died in London, England, ten days before Duke Ellington's death, after a lifetime of addiction to alcohol and narcotics. Mercer Ellington refused to tell Duke of the passing of Gonsalves, fearing the shock might further accelerate his father's decline. Ellington and Gonsalves, along with trombonist Tyree Glenn, lay side by side in the same New York funeral home for a period of time.

Gonsalves is buried at Long Island National Cemetery in Farmingdale, New York.

== Discography ==
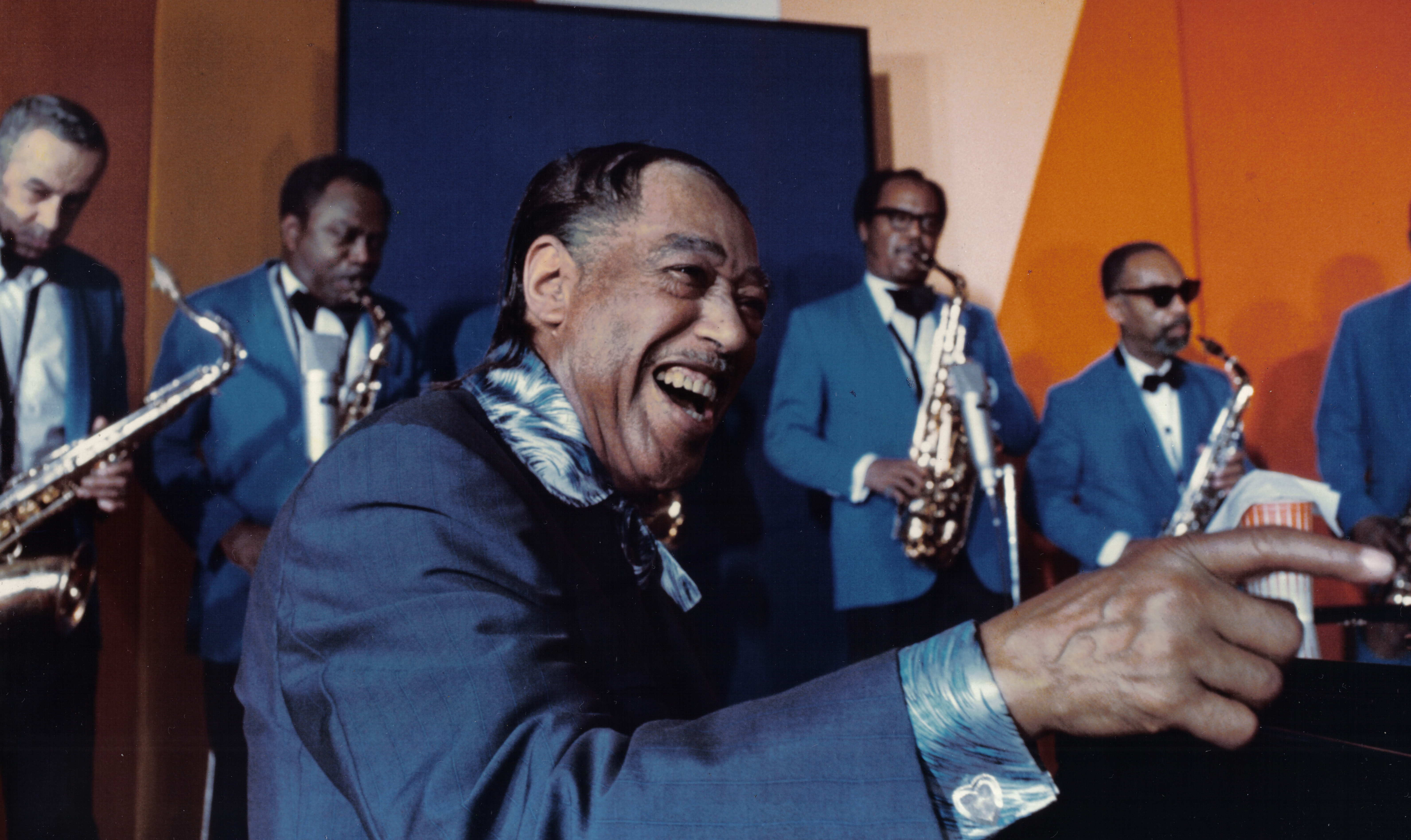
Gonsalves (far left) appeared with Ellington in the 1971 film L'Aventure du jazz (titled in English, Jazz Odyssey / The Adventure of Jazz), by Louis Panassié.

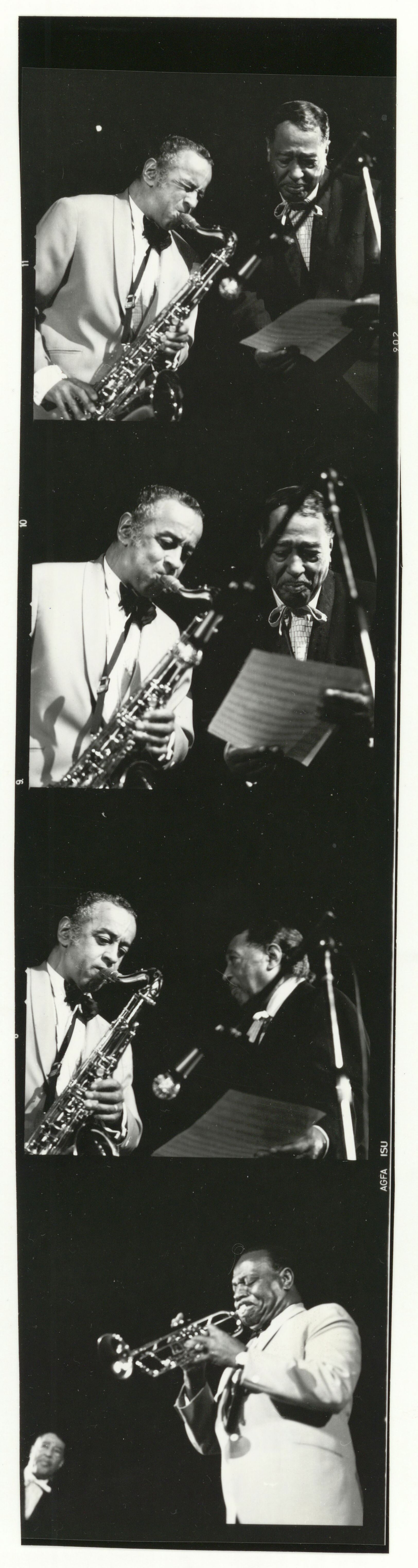
Gonsalves with Ellington at the Chorégies d'Orange festival in France, 1970

=== As leader/co-leader ===
- Cookin' (Argo, 1957)
- Diminuendo, Crescendo and Blues (RCA Victor, 1958)
- Ellingtonia Moods and Blues (RCA Victor, 1960)
- Gettin' Together! (Jazzland, 1961)
- Tenor Stuff (Columbia, 1961) – with Harold Ashby
- Tell It the Way It Is! (Impulse!, 1963)
- Cleopatra Feelin' Jazzy (Impulse!, 1963)
- Salt and Pepper (Impulse!, 1963) – with Sonny Stitt
- Rare Paul Gonsalves Sextet in Europe (Jazz Connoisseur, 1963)
- Boom-Jackie-Boom-Chick (Vocalion, 1964)
- Just Friends (Columbia EMI, 1964) – with Tubby Hayes
- Change of Setting (World Record Club, 1965) – with Tubby Hayes
- Jazz Till Midnight (Storyville, 1967)
- Love Calls (RCA, 1967) – with Eddie "Lockjaw" Davis
- Encuentro (Fresh Sound, 1968)
- With the Swingers and the Four Bones (Riviera, 1969)
- Humming Bird (Deram, 1970)
- Just a-Sittin' and a-Rockin' (Black Lion, 1970)
- Paul Gonsalves and His All Stars (Riviera, 1970)
- Paul Gonsalves Meets Earl Hines (Black Lion, 1970)
- Mexican Bandit Meets Pittsburgh Pirate (Fantasy, 1973)
- Paul Gonsalves Paul Quinichette (1974)
- Sitting In (Silk City, 2014) – Paul Gonsalves and Clyde Fats Wright

=== As sideman ===
With Duke Ellington

- Ellington at Newport (Columbia, 1956)
- All Star Road Band (Doctor Jazz, 1957 [1983])
- All Star Road Band Volume 2 (Doctor Jazz, 1964 [1985])
- Hot Summer Dance (Red Baron, 1960 [1991])
- Live at the Crystal Gardens 1952 (Hep)
- Jazz Party (Columbia, 1959)
- Harlem (Pablo, 1964 [1989])
- Ella and Duke at the Cote D'Azur (Verve, 1966)
- Far East Suite (Bluebird/RCA, 1966)
- Liederhalle Stuttgart 1967 (Jazzhaus, 2011)
- Live at the Opernhaus Cologne 1969 (Jazzline, 2016)
- 70th Birthday Concert (Solid State, 1969)
- Featuring Paul Gonsalves (Fantasy, 1985)

With Eddie "Lockjaw" Davis

- Love Calls (RCA Victor, 1968)

With Johnny Hodges

- Ellingtonia '56 (Norgran, 1956)
- The Big Sound (Verve, 1957)
- Triple Play (RCA Victor, 1967)

With John Lewis

- The Wonderful World of Jazz (Atlantic, 1960)

With Billy Taylor

- Taylor Made Jazz (Argo, 1959)

With Clark Terry

- Duke with a Difference (Riverside, 1957)
- Diminuendo, Crescendo and Blues (RCA Victor, 1958)

With Jimmy Woode

- The Colorful Strings of Jimmy Woode (Argo, 1957)

With Joya Sherrill

- Joya Sherrill Sings Duke (20th Century Fox, 1965)
