= Lush Life (jazz song) =

1948 song written by Billy Strayhorn

Song
- Written: 1933–1936
- Published: 1949 by Tempo Music
- Released: 1948
- Genre: Jazz
- Songwriter: Billy Strayhorn

"Lush Life" is a jazz standard that was written by Billy Strayhorn between 1933 and 1936. It was performed publicly for the first time by Strayhorn and vocalist Kay Davis with the Duke Ellington Orchestra at Carnegie Hall on November 13, 1948. Jazz critic Ted Gioia says the song "ranks among the most sophisticated jazz ballads—whether one considers its intricate harmonic palette, its elaborate structure, or just its world-weary lyrics."

== Background ==
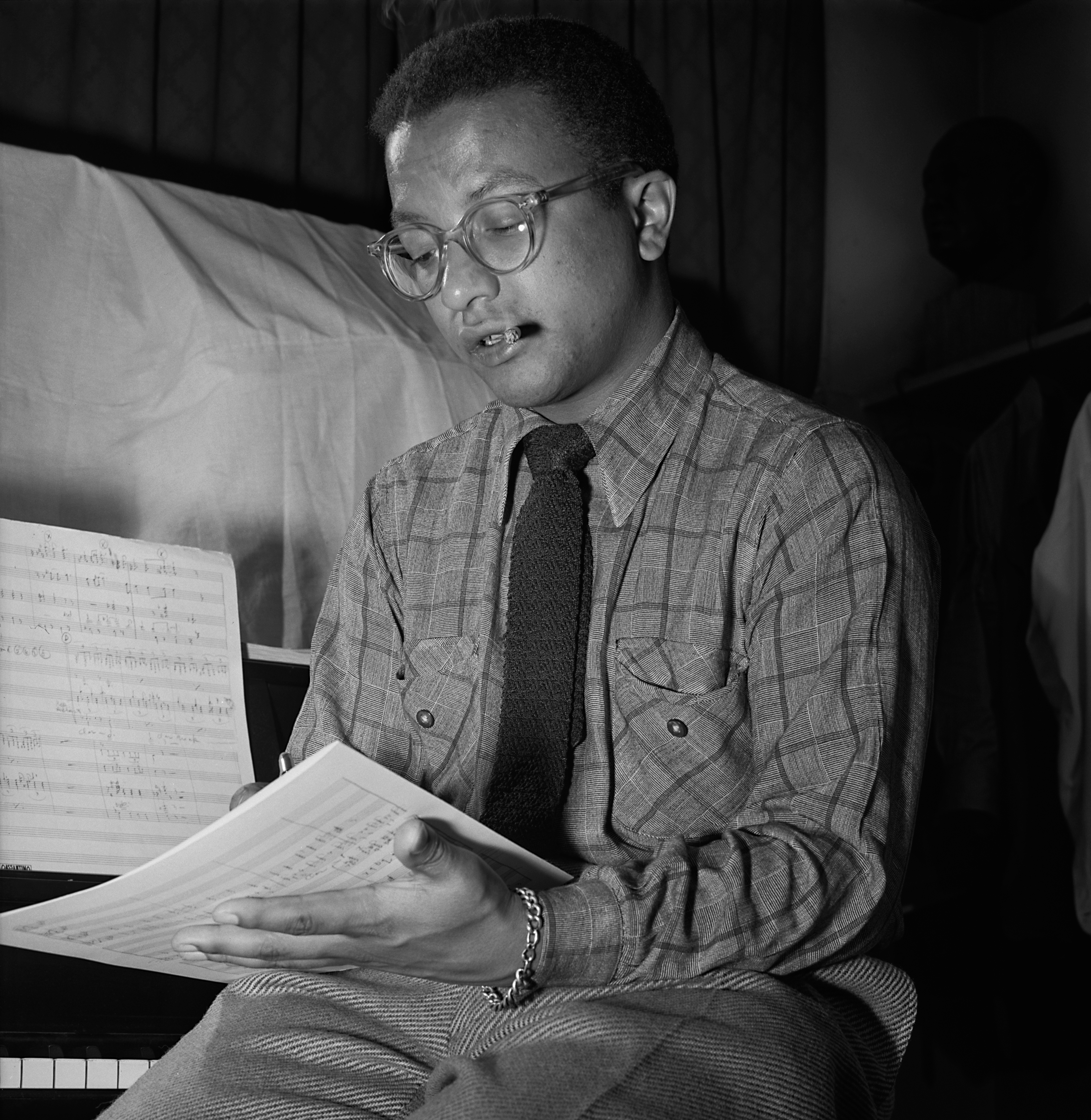
Billy Strayhorn

The verse describes the author's weariness of the night life after a failed romance, wasting time with "jazz and cocktails" at "come-what-may places" and in the company of girls with "sad and sullen gray faces/ with distingué traces". Strayhorn was a teenager when he wrote most of the song, which was to become one of his signature compositions, along with "Take the 'A' Train".

The song was written in the key of D-flat major. The melody moves over relatively complex chords, with chromatic turns and modulations evoking a dreamlike state and the dissolute spirit of the "lush life". The song's verse is 32 bars long, and its chorus is 24 bars. Unlike most other jazz standards with a verse and a chorus, "Lush Life" is never performed without the verse because it is completely integral to the composition. Gioia calls this standard "an art song, not a pop tune". Strayhorn's biographer, David Hajdu, says, "It is a masterpiece of fatalistic sophistication that belies its author's youth .... Most impressively, the piece exquisitely weds words and music: A key change on 'everything seemed so sure' suddenly suggests optimism, and stress notes—for instance, the 'blue note' E-natural on the word jazz—fall precisely on the lyrics' points of drama."

During a 1949 interview, Strayhorn spoke of the song's genesis: "'Lush Life' wasn't the first tune of mine Duke [Ellington] heard. In fact, he didn't hear it until just a little while ago. I wrote it in 1936 while I was clerking at the Pennfield drugstore on the corner of Washington and Penn in Pittsburgh …. I was writing a song a day then, and I've forgotten many of them myself …. One night I remembered it and played it for Duke …. I called it 'Life is Lonely,' but when anyone wanted me to play it they'd ask for 'that thing about lush life'." Mercer Ellington, though, recalled that "Lush Life" and "Something to Live For" were the songs responsible for Duke Ellington's decision to hire Strayhorn in early 1939.

Nat King Cole recorded "Lush Life" in 1949, while trumpeter Harry James recorded it four times. In the 1950s, it was recorded by jazz vocalists Ella Fitzgerald, Carmen McRae, Sarah Vaughan, and Chris Connor. John Coltrane recorded it twice. The first was a 14-minute version recorded in 1958 as the title track of an album for Prestige with trumpeter Donald Byrd. The other was on John Coltrane and Johnny Hartman, with vocalist Johnny Hartman, recorded in 1963, which Gioia notes "cast a long shadow over all later attempts to perform" the song. Strayhorn himself recorded it in 1961 with wordless vocals by the Paris Blue Notes for his album The Peaceful Side. Frank Sinatra attempted to record a version of it for his 1958 Only the Lonely album but never finished a complete version. The unfinished takes of Sinatra singing "Lush Life" were eventually officially released on the 60th anniversary rerelease of the album.

"Lush Life" has gone on to become one of the most widely recorded of all jazz standards. Linda Ronstadt's version won the Grammy Award for Best Instrumental Arrangement Accompanying Vocal(s) (1986). Kurt Elling recorded a version for his tribute album Dedicated to You: Kurt Elling Sings the Music of Coltrane and Hartman (2009).

== Some other notable versions ==
- Bud Powell – Strictly Powell (1956)
- Billy Eckstine – No Cover, No Minimum (1960)
- Nancy Wilson – Lush Life (1967)
- Stan Getz – Captain Marvel (1972)
- Donna Summer – Donna Summer produced by Quincy Jones (1982)
- Rickie Lee Jones – Girl at Her Volcano (1983)
- Joe Pass – Virtuoso No. 4 (1983, recorded in 1973)
- McCoy Tyner – Things Ain't What They Used to Be (1989)
- Queen Latifah – The Dana Owens Album (2004)
- Roberta Gambarini with Hank Jones - You Are There (2005)
- Lady Gaga – Cheek to Cheek (2014)
