= Premium Records =

American record label

Premium Records was an American record label established in Chicago in 1950 by Lee Egalnick, who had previously run Miracle Records. Lew Simpkins, who had also worked at Miracle, joined Premium soon afterwards.

Its recording artists included Memphis Slim, Miff Mole, Eddie Chamblee, Lynn Hope, Sarah McLawler, Terry Timmons, Jesse Cryor, and Tab Smith. The label folded in mid-1951. Simpkins went on to form United Records, and the Premium label's master recordings were bought by Chess Records.
