= Lloyd Trotman =

American musician (1923–2007)

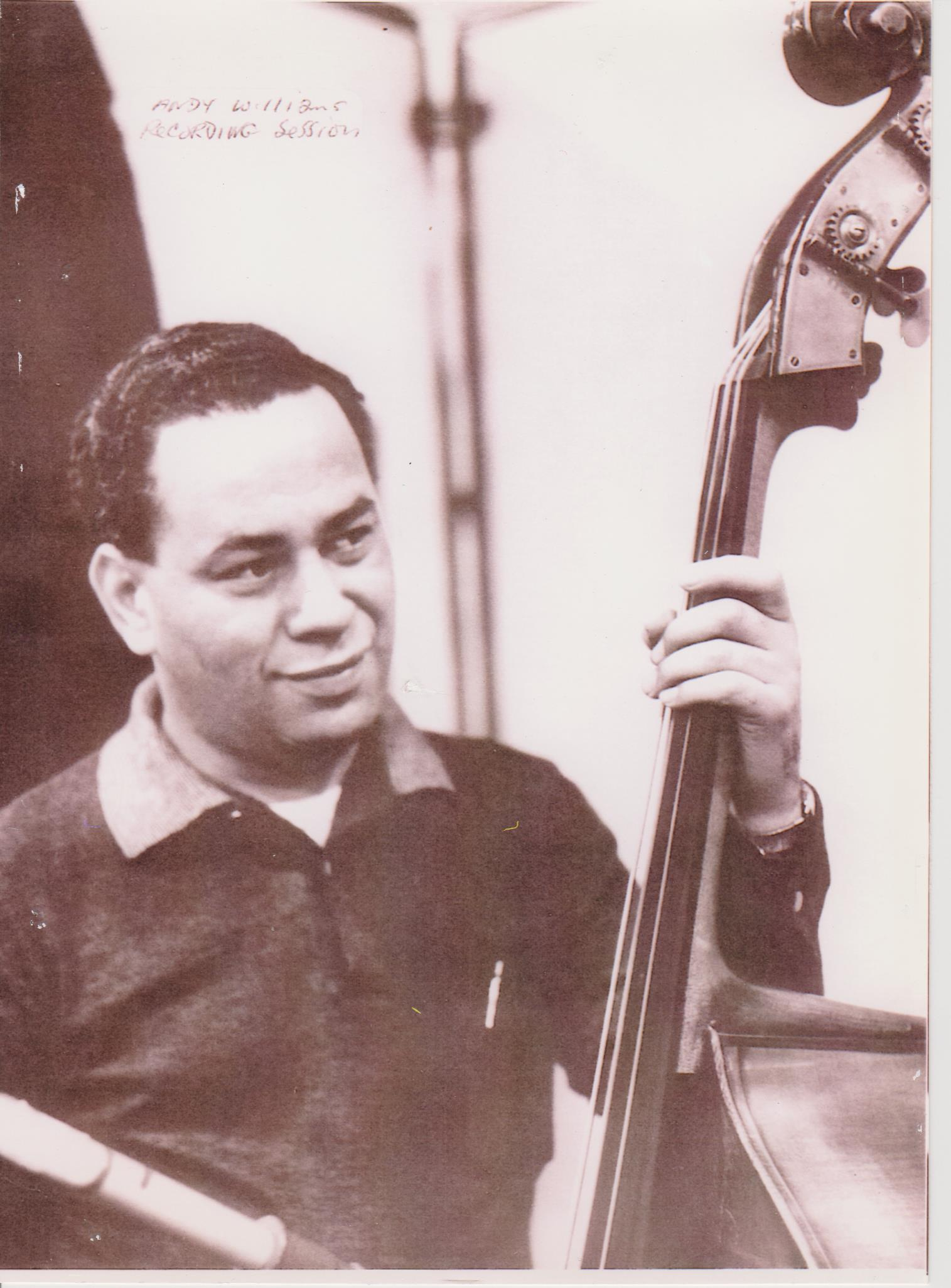
- June 1955

Background information
- Born: Lloyd Nelson Trotman; May 25, 1923
- Origin: Boston, Massachusetts, United States
- Died: October 3, 2007 (aged 84)
- Genres: Jazz, R&B
- Instrument: Double bass
- Years active: 1940s–1970s
- Labels: Atlantic Records, Cadence Records, King Records and others

Lloyd Nelson Trotman (May 25, 1923 – October 3, 2007), born in Boston, Massachusetts, United States, was an American jazz bassist, who backed numerous jazz, dixieland, R&B, and rock and roll artists in the 1940s, 1950s and 1960s. He resided in Huntington, Long Island, New York between 1962 and 2007, and prior to that in East Elmhurst, Queens, New York from 1945 to 1962. He worked primarily out of New York City. He provided the bass line on Ben E. King's "Stand by Me".

Trotman became a session musician for Atlantic Records and other independent record companies and throughout the 1950s and into the 1960s he backed a wide variety of artists, including R&B artists such as Varetta Dillard, LaVern Baker, Ruth Brown, Ray Charles, Al Hibbler, Big Joe Turner, Nappy Brown, Linda Hopkins, Mickey Baker, Chuck Willis, Ben E. King, The Drifters ("Save the Last Dance for Me"), Sam Cooke, James Brown, Pat Thomas, The Platters, Everly Brothers, Screamin' Jay Hawkins, Clyde McPhatter, Ivory Joe Hunter, Jackie Wilson, Mickey & Sylvia, The Coasters, The Clovers, The Isley Brothers, Big Maybelle, Memphis Slim, Brother John Sellers, Sister Rosetta Tharpe, Otis Blackwell, Ray Peterson, Cousin Joe, Dinah Washington, and Brook Benton.

Trotman began playing the club scene on 52nd Street in New York in 1945, playing with Duke Ellington and Billie Holiday. One of his earliest recording sessions was on Duke Ellington's 1950 album, Great Times! with Billy Strayhorn and Oscar Pettiford.

He worked with, traveled with, and recorded with many jazz artists including Johnny Hodges, Woody Herman, Lawrence Brown, Bud Powell, Al Sears, Henry "Red" Allen, Coleman Hawkins, Jimmy Scott, Billy Taylor, Don Wilkerson, Billie Holiday, Lucky Millinder, Boyd Raeburn, and Blanche Calloway.

As a session musician he worked for Atlantic Records, RCA Victor, Mercury Records, Okeh Records, Vik Records, Cadence Records, Brunswick Records and at other recording studios during the 1950s. He played with the following musicians: Sam "The Man" Taylor, King Curtis, Panama Francis, Mickey Baker, Ernie Hayes, Al Caiola among others.

He was a member of Alan Freed's Rock & Roll Orchestra at the Brooklyn Paramount and Fox Theaters during the late 1950s. He was a member of the Apollo house band during the late 1940s and early 1950s.

Trotman worked with the following producers and arrangers: Ahmet Ertegun, Jerry Wexler, Leiber and Stoller, Quincy Jones, Jesse Stone, Sammy Lowe, Leroy Kirkland, Archie Bleyer, and Hugo & Luigi among others. He made hundreds of records during this time period, many of them major hits.

Trotman played on the following TV shows: Tommy Dorsey Show with Henry "Red" Allen (September 1954), Alan Freed TV Show (May and July, 1957), PM East-PM West with Sam Cooke (May and June 1961), and the Ed Sullivan Show with Paul Anka (April 1963).

He worked with Henry "Red" Allen at the Newport Jazz Festival (July 5, 1959). He played the New York World's Fair Wonder World Aqua Show (April to July 1964). He also did the Broadway play Flora The Red Menace with Liza Minnelli from May to July 1965.

Trotman continued to play many weekend nightclub dates into the early 1980s. After retiring from the music business, he became a loan officer at Islip National Bank. Mostly, Trotman was devoted to his family - Gertrude, his wife of 62 years; and his three children, Linda, Timothy, and Nelson. Trotman received many awards and had newspaper and magazine articles written about his career. He gave interviews and spoke with high school classes, senior citizen centers, and community groups about his life and career.

Lloyd Trotman died of pneumonia aged 84, on October 3, 2007, on Long Island, and is buried at Pinelawn Memorial Park, in Farmingdale, New York.

== Discography ==
- Duke Ellington / Billy Strayhorn – Great Times! (1950)
- Big Joe Turner – "Shake, Rattle and Roll" (1954), "Corrine, Corrina" (1956)
- Chuck Willis – "C.C. Rider" (1957)
- Henry "Red" Allen – World on a String (1957)
- The Coasters – "Yakety Yak" (1958)
- Ruth Brown - Ruth Brown (Atlantic, 1957), Miss Rhythm (Atlantic, 1959)
- Ben E. King – "Spanish Harlem" (1960), "Stand by Me" (1961)
- Don Wilkerson – Elder Don (1962)
- The Drifters - "Save the Last Dance for Me" (1960)
- King Curtis - Azure (1960)
- Erskine Hawkins - The Hawk Blows At Midnight (1960)
- Big Maybelle - "Whole Lotta Shakin' Goin' On" (1955)
- Screamin' Jay Hawkins - "I Put A Spell On You" (1956)
- Everly Brothers - "Let It Be Me" (1959)
- Al Sears - The Big Raw Tone (King, 1951)
- Johnny Hodges - Castle Rock (Verve, 1951-52 [1955]), In a Tender Mood (Norgran, 1952 [1955])
- Ray Charles - "Mess Around" (Atlantic, 1953)
- Memphis Slim - Legend of the Blues Vol. 1 and vol.2 (Verve, 1967)
- Memphis Slim - The Legacy of the Blues Vol. 7 (Sonet, 1973)
- James Brown - Prisoner of Love (King, 1963)
- Jackie Wilson - "Reet Petite"
