= Terry Timmons =

American singer (1927–1970)

Terry Timmons (born Teresa Walker, 12 April 1927 – 3 August 1970) was an American R&B singer who performed and recorded in the late 1940s and early 1950s in a style that was compared to Dinah Washington.

She was born in Cleveland, Ohio, shortly after her parents and brothers had moved from Charleston, West Virginia. She sang at school, and began singing professionally while in her mid-teens. She was spotted singing in a club by Paul Gayten who recruited her to his band as a replacement for Annie Laurie. In the late 1940s she moved to Chicago, and began performing as the featured singer with Memphis Slim's band, the Houserockers. Her first recordings were in late 1950 for Premium Records in Chicago, who released two singles, "Eating My Heart Out For You" / "Your Key Won't Fit In My Door", and "You Foolish Thing".

In 1951, the record label was bought by RCA Victor, who released further recordings by her with Memphis Slim, including "Got Nobody To Love" - reissued as a single by the Jazzman label in 2011 - and "Daddy Be Good To Me". She continued to perform with Memphis Slim in Chicago, toured the Midwest, and recorded for RCA Victor until 1953, but her records had little commercial success. In 1953 she signed for the independent United label, and released further solo singles, but her recording career ended after her then boyfriend botched the accompaniment on her recordings.

Terry Timmons was the sister-in-law of singer Little Jimmy Scott. She continued to perform in Chicago clubs in the late 1950s. She died in 1970, aged 43.

A CD of her recordings, The Chronological Terry Timmons, 1950-1953, was released by the FrenchClassic Jazz label in 2004.
