= Battle Records (record label) =

Defunct American record label

Battle Records was an American independent record label, founded as J.V.B. Records in Detroit, Michigan, United States, by the record shop owner Joe Von Battle in 1948. The label specialized in gospel music, jazz and rhythm and blues.

In 1962, the J.V.B. label was replaced by the Battle label which was taken over by Bill Grauer Productions, which also owned Riverside Records.

Among the artists who recorded for J.V.B./Battle were Rev. C. L. Franklin, his daughter Aretha Franklin, John Lee Hooker, Memphis Slim, Willie Dixon and Mongo Santamaria, who recorded the label's biggest hit, "Watermelon Man".

The label operated into 1966.

== Discography ==
- 6101 - John's Vision of a New Heaven - Rev. C.L. Franklin [1962] Reissue of J.V.B. 101.
- 6102 - Except I Shall See in His Hands the Print of the Nails - Rev. C.L. Franklin [1962]
- 6103 - All Things Work Together for the Good to Them That Love God - Rev. C.L. Franklin [1962]
- 6104 - Rock My Soul - Loftonaires [1962]
- 6105 - Spirituals - Various Artists [1962] ] Reissue of J.V.B. 100, the cover graphics are the same as the J.V.B. album. Recorded During Service at New Bethel Baptist Church, Detroit Michigan. There is a Fountain Filled With Blood - Aretha Franklin/Precious Lord, Parts 1 & 2 - Aretha Franklin/You Grow Closer - Aretha Franklin/Never Grow Old - Aretha Franklin/The Angels Keep Watching Over Me - Sammie Bryant/The Last Mile - Sammie Bryant/The Lord Will Make A Way, Parts 1 & 2 - Rev. C.L. Franklin/Trying To Get Home, Parts 1 & 2 - Rev. C.L. Franklin
- 6106 - I Hear the Voice - J. Robert Bradley & Rev. C.L. Franklin [1962]
- 6107 - Highest Ground - Loftonaires [1962]
- 6108 - Why Are Ye Afraid, O Ye of So Little Faith - Rev. C.L. Franklin [1962]
- 6109 - I Will Trust In The Lord - Rev. C.L. Franklin, Aretha Franklin, and Sammie Bryant [1962]
- 6110 - Did Not Our Hearts Burn While He Talked By the Wayside - Rev. C.L. Franklin [1962]
- 6111 - How Long Halt Ye Between Two Opinions - Rev. C.L. Franklin [1962]
- 6112 - Hannah the Ideal Mother - Rev. C.L. Franklin [1962] Reissue of J.V.B. 105.
- 6113 - Blues Man - John Lee Hooker [1963]
- 6114 - How Long Blues - John Lee Hooker [1963] Black Snake/How Long Blues/Wobblin' Baby/She's Long, She's Tall, She Weeps Like A Willow Tree/Pea Vine Special/Tupelo Blues/I'm PrisonBound//I Rowed A Little Boat/Water Boy/Church Bell Tone/Bundle Up And Go/Good Mornin', Lil' School Girl/Behind The Plow
- 6115 - Paul's Meditation on Immorality - Rev. C.L. Franklin [1962]
- 6116 - Grace Made a Change - Rev. Cleophus Robinson [1962]
- 6117 - Eternity of the Church - Rev. C.L. Franklin [1963]
- 6118/BS 96118 - Alone with My Friends - Memphis Slim [1963] Rockin' Chair/I Feel So Good/Plowhand Blues/7 others
- 6119 - Jesus Met a Woman at the Well - Rev. C.L. Franklin [1963] Reissue of J.V.B. 106.
- 6120/BS 96120 - Watermelon Man - Mongo Santamaria & His Orchestra [1963] (5- 63, #42) Recorded at Plaza Sound Studios, New York; produced by Bill Grauer Productions. Watermelon Man (S)/Funny Money (S)/Cut That Cane (S)/Get The Money (S)/The Boogie Cha Cha Blues (S)/Don't Bother Me No More (S)//Love Oh Love (S)/Yeh-Yeh (S)/The Peanut Vendor (S)/Go Git It (S)/Bayou Roots (S)/Suavito (S)
- 6121/BS 96121 - April in Paris - Don Byas [1963]
- 6122/BS 96122 - Memphis Slim and Willie Dixon in Paris - Memphis Slim & Willie Dixon [1963] Rock And Rolling The House/Baby Please Come Home/How Come You Do Me Like You Do/The Way She Loves A Man/New Way To Love/African Hunch With A Boogie Beat//Shame Pretty Girls/Baby, Baby, Baby/Do De Do/Cool Blooded/Just You And I/Pigalle Love/All By Myself
- 6123/BS 96123 - Cool Samba - Joao Meirelles & His Bossa Kings [1963] 13 Selections.
- 6124/BS 96124 - You've Got to Love Everybody! - Rev. Cleophus Robinson [1963]
- 6125/BS 96125 - Everybody Wants Freedom - Carolina Freedom Fighters [1963] Everybody Wants Freedom/We Shall Not Be Moved/Woke Up This Morning/others
- 6126/BS 96126 - Teenage Hootenanny - Millburnaires '63 [1963] Blowing In The Wind/What Have They Done To The Rain?/The Virgin Mary Had A Baby Boy/Plaisir d'Amour/Take Her Out Of Pity/Passin' Through//Shenandoah/500 Miles/Our Hands Were Strong/Dona Dona/Joan, Joan/When She Cries
- 6127/BS 96127 - One Step Closer - Duncanaires [1964]
- 6128/BS 96128 - Bluegrass Hootenanny - Lonesome River Boys [1964]
- 6129/BS 96129 - Mongo at the Village Gate - Mongo Santamaria [1963]
- 6130/BS 96130 - Hot Rod Caravan - Sound Effects [1964]
- 6131/BS 96131 - Hot Rods U.S.A - Sound Effects . [1964]
- 6132/BS 96132 - Cement Roaster - Sound Effects [1964]
- 6133/BS 96133 - Hot Stuff on Asphalt - Sound Effects [1964]
- 6134/BS 96134 - Rods and Drags Forever - Sound Effects [1964]
- 6135/BS 96135 - Chrome on the Range - Sound Effects [1964]
- 6136/BS 96136 - Dig Out - Sound Effects [1964]
- 6137/BS 96137 - Sport Car Caravan - Sound Effects [1964]
- 6138/BS 96138 - Grand Prix-USA - Sound Effects [1964]
- 6139/BS 96139 - Road Racing America - Sound Effects [1964]
- 6140/BS 96140 - Cycles Galore - Sound Effects [1964]
- 6141/BS 96141 - I'm Saved and I Know It - Gable-Airs [1964]
- 6142/BS 96142 - Someone to Care - Rev. Cleophus Robinson [1964]
