= Cue for Saxophone =

Studio album by Billy Strayhorn
- Released: 1959
- Recorded: April 14, 1959 in New York City
- Genre: Jazz
- Length: 39:54
- Label: Felsted FAJ 7008
- Producer: Stanley Dance

Billy Strayhorn chronology
Great Times! (1950)	Cue for Saxophone (1959)	The Peaceful Side (1961)

Cue for Saxophone is an album by pianist and composer Billy Strayhorn's Septet comprising members of the Duke Ellington Orchestra recorded in 1959 and originally released on the Felsted label in 1959, then reissued by Vocalion in 1962.

Strayhorn biographer David Hajdu has written that Cue for Saxophone was conceived by producer Stanley Dance as a Johnny Hodges small-group jazz album, much like the Hodges LPs that were being released by Verve Records at the time. It was released under Strayhorn's name (and Hodges was only listed under the pseudonym "Cue Porter") because Hodges was contractually prohibited from releasing albums on other record labels: "Since Hodges was under contract with Norman Granz to record exclusively for Verve Records, Dance found himself prohibited from releasing the album under Hodge's name. As an out, he titled it Cue for Saxophone, a hint at the featured player's identity, and issued the record in the name of Billy Strayhorn's Septet. 'Billy didn't care,' said Dance. Indeed, as [drummer Oliver] Jackson explained, Strayhorn seemed to exert a minimum of creative effort on the project. 'He showed up late, and he didn't have anything planned....He knocked off whatever arrangements we used off the top of his head. He didn't seem to give much of a damn, and the thing had his name on it....I said, 'Hey Strays, isn't this something, man? All those things you did for Duke, and all the people think Duke did 'em? And here there's finally a record with your own name on it, and it's really Rabs!'" For the same reason, a 1958 recording of the Duke Ellington Orchestra live at the Blue Note club in Chicago was originally released on Roulette Records under Strayhorn's name as Billy Strayhorn Live!!!"

== Reception ==
Professional ratings
Review scores
Source	Rating
Allmusic	4/5 stars

The Allmusic review by Scott Yanow stated: "Composer/arranger/pianist Billy Strayhorn led surprisingly few sessions throughout his career, and this was only his second full-length album. Actually, the main star is altoist Johnny Hodges (who goes here under the pseudonym of "Cue Porter"), while Strayhorn (who plays piano on the seven songs) only co-wrote two basic tunes... The results are a fine mainstream session".

== Track listing ==
1. "Cue's Blue Now" (Billy Strayhorn, Johnny Hodges) - 10:07
2. "Gone with the Wind" (Allie Wrubel, Herb Magidson) - 4:18
3. "Cherry" (Don Redman, Ray Gilbert) - 5:54
4. "Watch Your Cue" (Strayhorn, Hodges) - 3:10
5. "You Brought a New Kind of Love to Me" (Irving Kahal, Pierre Norman, Sammy Fain) - 7:23
6. "When I Dream Of You" (Charlie Carpenter, Earl Hines) - 3:33
7. "Rose Room" (Art Hickman, Harry Williams) - 6:02

== Personnel ==
- Billy Strayhorn - piano
- "Cue Porter" (Johnny Hodges) - alto saxophone
- Harold "Shorty" Baker - trumpet
- Quentin Jackson - trombone
- Russell Procope - clarinet
- Al Hall - bass
- Oliver Jackson - drums
