= Chelsea Bridge (song) =

Jazz standard composed by Billy Strayhorn

Song
- Written: 1941
- Recorded: December 2, 1941
- Genre: Jazz
- Label: RCA Victor 27856
- Composer: Billy Strayhorn
- Lyricist: Bill Comstock (1958)

"Chelsea Bridge" is an impressionistic jazz standard composed by Billy Strayhorn in 1941.

== History ==
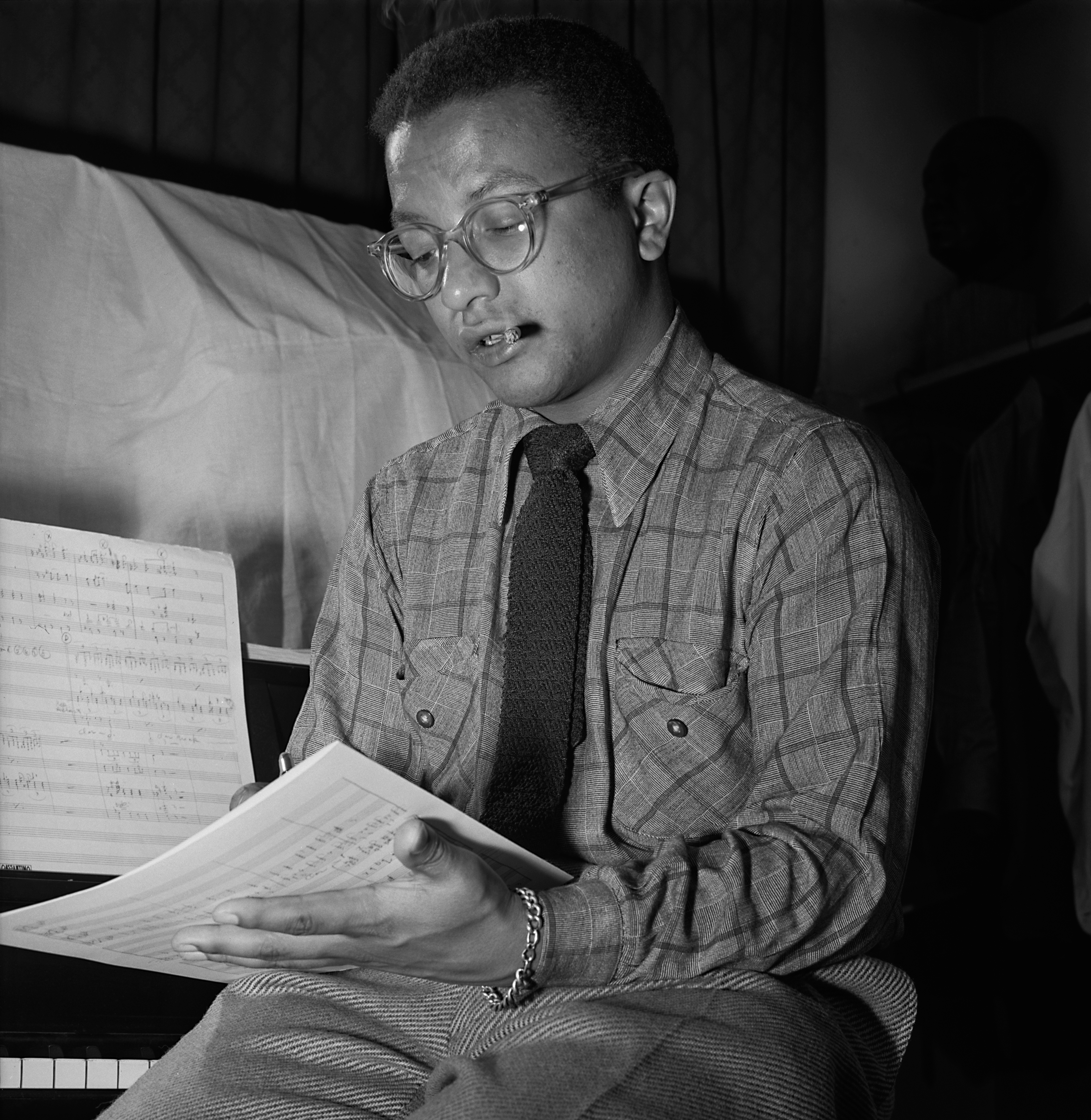
Billy Strayhorn, c. 1947

The piece was originally recorded by the Duke Ellington orchestra on December 2, 1941, with Strayhorn (rather than Ellington himself) on piano and solos by tenor saxophonist Ben Webster and valve trombonist Juan Tizol. It has since been recorded by Webster several times, including with Gerry Mulligan in 1959, as well as by Vince Guaraldi (1956), Tommy Flanagan (1957 and 1975), Joe Henderson (1967), Kenny Burrell (1975), Stan Kenton (1978), Bobby Hutcherson (1988), Lew Tabackin (1989), Vincent Herring (1992), Joe Lovano (1994), Ahmad Jamal (1995), André Previn (1999 and live in 2000), Keith Jarrett (1999), and Wynton Marsalis (1999), among many others. Strayhorn himself returned to the piece, recording it as an unaccompanied piano solo on his 1961 album The Peaceful Side. Another version appears on the posthumously released album Lush Life, issued by the Red Baron label.

In 1958, lyrics were written for the song by Bill Comstock, a member of The Four Freshmen for the group's album Voices in Latin. Ella Fitzgerald recorded a wordless vocal version with Ellington on her albums Ella Fitzgerald Sings the Duke Ellington Song Book (1957) and Ella and Duke at the Cote D'Azur (1967); it has also been recorded by other vocalists such as Sarah Vaughan (1979), Cassandra Wilson (1991), Tina May (1995), and Dianne Reeves with Daniel Barenboim (1998).

== Composition ==
According to Ellington biographer James Lincoln Collier, during a trip to Europe, Strayhorn was inspired by a J. M. W. Turner or James McNeill Whistler painting of Battersea Bridge and perhaps mistakenly named the song after Chelsea Bridge. Strayhorn biographer David Hajdu notes that "[u]nlike conventional tune-based pop and jazz numbers of the day, 'Chelsea Bridge' is 'classical' in its integration of melody and harmony as an organic whole." He also observes that it "vividly evokes the water below" the bridge rather than the bridge itself and that the piece is indebted to the work of Claude Debussy. Hajdu also quotes noted jazz arranger and composer Gil Evans as saying, "From the moment I first heard 'Chelsea Bridge,' I set out to try to do that. That's all I did ... tried to do what Billy Strayhorn did."

In an analysis of the piece's haunting melody, Gunther Schuller writes, "What Strayhorn exploited in the theme of 'Chelsea Bridge' is the duality of its chromatic harmonies. The theme is set in its first three bars in minor sixth chords with an added major seventh. However, Strayhorn causes us to hear these harmonies as if they were whole-tone chords. He achieves this effect by two means: 1) through orchestrational and dynamic stressing of the three upper notes [and] 2) by setting these sixth chords in their third inversions. This latter device takes away the rootedness of the harmonies, letting them float, so to speak, more towards the top of their structure."
