= Love for Sale =

Love for Sale may refer to:

== Film ==
- Love for Sale (1951 film), a Mexican musical film
- Love for Sale (2006 film), or Suely in the Sky, a Brazilian drama film
- Love for Sale (2008 film), an American romantic comedy film
- Love for Sale (2018 film), an Indonesian romantic drama film

== Literature ==
- Love for Sale, a 2003 mystery novel by Jill Churchill
- Love for Sale (book), a 2016 music history book by David Hajdu

== Music ==
=== Songs ===
- "Love for Sale" (song), written by Cole Porter, 1930
- "Love for Sale", by Talking Heads, from True Stories, 1986
- "Love for Sale", by Bon Jovi, from New Jersey, 1988
- "Love for Sale", by Ace of Base, the B-side of "Always Have, Always Will", 1998
- "Love for Sale", by Motörhead, from Snake Bite Love, 1998

=== Albums ===
- Love for Sale (Cecil Taylor album), 1959
- Love for Sale (Dexter Gordon album), a live album recorded in 1964 and released in 1982
- Love for Sale (Eartha Kitt), 1965
- Love for Sale (Great Jazz Trio album), 1976
- Love for Sale (Boney M. album), 1977
- Love for Sale (Mary Coughlan album), 1995
- Love for Sale (Bilal album), 2006
- Love for Sale (Tony Bennett and Lady Gaga album), 2021
