= The Peaceful Side =

Studio album by Billy Strayhorn
- Released: 1963
- Recorded: May 1961
- Studio: Barclay Studios (Paris, France)
- Genre: Jazz
- Length: 35:03
- Label: United Artists Jazz UAJ 14010; Solid State SS 18031
- Producer: Alan Douglas

Billy Strayhorn chronology
Cue for Saxophone (1959)	The Peaceful Side (1963)

The Peaceful Side is an album by pianist and composer Billy Strayhorn recorded in Paris in 1961 and originally released on United Artists Jazz in 1963, then reissued by Solid State in 1968 as The Peaceful Side of Billy Strayhorn.

== Background ==
After completing work on the soundtrack for the film Paris Blues, Strayhorn was approached by the young American record producer Alan Douglas, who was scouting projects to record "efficiently" in Europe for United Artists. Douglas reportedly asked, "Billy, when are you going to sit down and record something yourself? We know how your stuff sounds when Duke plays it. Why not let us hear how it sounds when you play it?" And Strayhorn responded, "Why not?"

Douglas and Strayhorn then booked two consecutive recording sessions starting at midnight, when studio rates were lower. Strayhorn arranged his pieces and lined up the musicians he wanted for what "would be an intimate album" of piano solos or duos with bassist Michel Gaudry, "occasionally accompanied by a string quartet or abstract voices in harmony." Douglas said, "It was an incredibly personal album. He conceived of it as something very introspective." The recording sessions went very smoothly and wrapped up at 5 a.m.

The repertoire for the album consists of many of Strayhorn's best-known pieces, most of which had first been recorded by Ellington groups in the 1940s. Strayhorn himself said of the album: "Here are some little things I have written over the years, and here is how I happened to feel about them one day in Paris."

== Reissues ==
The album was remastered and issued on CD by Capitol Jazz in 1996. Then in 2015, it was collected by Essential Jazz Classics as part of the 2-CD set of Strayhorn recordings titled Day Dream: Complete 1945-1961 Sessions as a Leader (EJC55667).

== Reception ==
Professional ratings
Review scores
Source	Rating
AllMusic	4/5 stars

The DownBeat review upon the album's release was positive: "After more than 20 years as an inextricable element in the musical complex that is Duke Ellington, Strayhorn emerges in these performances, recorded in Paris, as a personality in his own right. This is a lovely, low-key set."

Retrospectively, the AllMusic review by Scott Yanow stated: "This is a little-known and rather melancholy set, virtually Billy Strayhorn's only recording away from the world of Duke Ellington. The focus is totally on Strayhorn's piano throughout his interpretations of ten of his compositions. ... Strayhorn's melodic and concise playing is quite somber, peaceful in volume but filled with inner tension."

On All About Jazz, Joel Roberts noted, "This is a quiet, spare recording featuring just Strayhorn's piano with occasional accompaniment by bass, string quartet, or vocal chorus. Strayhorn brings out all the passion and melancholy of his own compositions, which are performed in much more relaxed tempos than we are used to hearing. ... It is a shame that Strayhorn did not record more, since he brought the same extraordinary musical intelligence and sophistication to his piano playing that he did to his composing."

Strayhorn biographer David Hajdu says, "Strayhorn's performances ... redefine many of the compositions in singular terms: 'A Train' is a graceful ballad with whispered strings; the densely orchestral 'Chelsea Bridge' is a spare piano solo; 'Just A-Sittin' and A-Rockin' rocks pensively."

== Track listing ==
All compositions by Billy Strayhorn except as indicated

1. "Lush Life" - 3:25 (feat. Paris Blue Notes)
2. "Just A-Sittin' and A-Rockin'" (Duke Ellington, Billy Strayhorn, Lee Gaines) - 2:49 (feat. Michel Gaudry)
3. "Passion Flower" (Billy Strayhorn, Milton Raskin (lyrics)) - 3:40 (feat. Michel Gaudry)
4. "Take the "A" Train" - 3:14 (feat. Paris String Quartet)
5. "Strange Feeling" (Ellington, Strayhorn) - 3:38
6. "Day Dream" (Ellington, Strayhorn, John La Touche) - 4:01 (feat. Paris Blue Notes)
7. "Chelsea Bridge" - 3:15
8. "Multi-Colored Blue" - 3:19 (feat. Paris Blue Notes, Michel Gaudry)
9. "Something to Live For" (Ellington, Strayhorn) - 2:59 (feat. Michel Gaudry)
10. "A Flower Is a Lovesome Thing" - 4:43 (feat. Paris String Quartet, Michel Gaudry)

== Personnel ==
- Billy Strayhorn - piano
- Michel Gaudry - bass on 2, 3, 8, 9, & 10
- Paris Blue Notes - vocal choir on 1, 6, & 8
- Paris String Quartet - strings on 4 & 10
