= Mother Earth (Memphis Slim song) =

1951 blues song

Single by Memphis Slim and the House Rockers
- B-side: "Really Got the Blues"
- Released: January 1951
- Recorded: 1950
- Genre: Blues
- Length: 2:42
- Label: Premium
- Songwriter: Peter Chatman a.k.a. Memphis Slim

"Mother Earth" is a blues song recorded by Memphis Slim in 1951. A slow twelve-bar blues, it is one of Slim's best-known songs and reached number seven in the Billboard R&B chart in 1951.

== Memphis Slim song ==
"Mother Earth" features an unusual descending chromatic figure and an often-quoted chorus:

Don't care how great you are, don't care what you're worth
When it all ends up you got to, go back to mother earth

A Billboard review in 1951 described it as "Blues moralizer, with group harmonizing in back of Slim's chanting, [having] a haunting effect, but [it] is on the tedious side". However, retrospective assessments include "an uncommonly wise down-tempo blues" and "one of the finest down-tempo blues songs ever recorded". Memphis Slim recorded several studio and live versions of the song during his career.

== Legacy ==
Several artists have recorded "Mother Earth", such as the 1960s San Francisco band Mother Earth, who took their name from the song. A 6:16 minute version of "Mother Earth", featuring vocals and piano by Tracy Nelson, is included on their 1968 debut album Living with the Animals.

In 1970, Eric Burdon & War included the song as part of the "Blues for Memphis Slim" medley for their 1970 debut album Eric Burdon Declares "War". In an AllMusic album review, Richie Unterberger described it as one of the tunes "showcas[ing] the then-unknown War's funky fusion, and Burdon's still-impressive vocals, but suffer from a lack of focus and substance." Two days before his death, Jimi Hendrix joined the band as an accompanist for the song at Ronnie Scott's Jazz Club in London, making "Mother Earth" one of his last public performances.

Southern rock band Gov't Mule would also cover the song as the opening track on their self-titled debut album in 1995.
