= Angel Child =

Angel Child may refer to:

- Angel Child (film), 1918
- "Angel Child" (traditional song) recorded by Memphis Slim (1948) and others
- "Angel Child" (Oasis song)
