= The Come Back =

1953 blues song

"The Come Back" is a 1953 song by Memphis Slim. It was one of his signature R&B chart hits.
