= The Four Blazes =

The Four Blazes were an American R&B vocal and instrumental group formed in Chicago and popular in the 1940s and 1950s. They were also occasionally billed as The Five Blazes and (probably just on record labels) as the "Blasers" or the "Flames."

== Career ==
The group was formed in 1940 by drummer Paul Lindsley "Jelly" Holt, an experienced Chicago musician who had previously been a member of the Five Rhythm Rocketeers. The Rocketeers had a residency at the Grand Terrace Ballroom, and linked up with Earl Hines for a European tour in 1939. When they returned, the Rocketeers broke up and Holt formed a new band, The Four Blazes. The other original members were Jimmy Bennett and William "Shorty" Hill on guitars and mandolin, and Prentice Butler on bass.

Bennett was later replaced by lead guitarist Floyd McDaniel (1915–1995), and the group also added pianist Ernie Harper (1920–1984) – brother of pianist Walt Harper from Pittsburgh. As The Five Blazes, they signed with Aristocrat Records in 1947, becoming only the second act to record for the predecessor to Chess Records. Confusingly, one of their numbers was "Chicago Boogie," and an entirely different group from Los Angeles called The Four Blazes recorded a song called "Chicago Blues" around the same time.

The Chicago group became The Four Blazes again after Ernie Harper left in 1948 for a solo career. In 1951, Butler died and was replaced by lead vocalist and bass player Tommy Braden. The group recorded a series of singles for United Records from 1952 onwards, several of them featuring saxophonist Eddie Chamblee. Their first release, "Mary Jo", peaked at number one on the R&B chart in August 1952, and the follow-ups "Please Send Her Back To Me" and "Perfect Woman" also made the R&B top ten.

In 1954, Braden left the band for a while, seeking a solo career; he died in 1957. Although Braden returned for a while, and Red Holloway took over from Eddie Chamblee accompanying the band in the studio, the Blazes broke up for good after a last recording session in 1955. "Jelly" Holt started a new vocal/instrumental group called the Four Whims before retiring in the early 1960s, and McDaniel performed with the Ink Spots before launching a solo career late in life.
