= All Kinds of Blues =

All Kind of Blues

Studio album by Memphis Slim
- Released: 1962
- Recorded: 1961
- Genre: Blues
- Length: 46:00
- Label: Bluesville
- Producer: Kenneth S. Goldstein

Memphis Slim chronology
Memphis Slim and Willie Dixon at the Village Gate (1962)	All Kind of Blues (1962)	Alone with My Friends (1963)

All Kind of Blues is an album by American blues pianist Memphis Slim which was recorded in 1961 and released on Bluesville, a sublabel of Prestige Records.

== Reception ==
Professional ratings
Review scores
Source	Rating
AllMusic	4.5/5 stars
The Penguin Guide to Blues Recordings	3/4 stars

In his review for AllMusic, Stephen Cook says "while newcomers are advised to start out with one of his early-'50s sets on Chess, this will be one collection no Memphis Slim fan will want to overlook."

== Track listing ==
All tracks traditional except where noted.

1. "Blues Is Troubles" – 3:21
2. "Grinder Man Blues" (Peter Chatman) – 4:32
3. "Three-In-One Boogie" – 4:26
4. "Letter Home" – 3:36
5. "Churnin' Man Blues" – 6:28
6. "Two of a Kind" (Peter Chatman) – 4:12
7. "The Blacks" – 5:08
8. "If You See Kay" – 4:27
9. "Frankie and Johnny Boogie'" – 4:05
10. "Mother Earth" (Peter Chatman) – 4:43

== Personnel ==
- Memphis Slim – vocals, piano
