= Blue and Lonesome (Memphis Slim song) =

Song by Memphis Slim
- Released: 1949
- Genre: Rhythm and blues
- Songwriter(s): Memphis Slim

"Blue and Lonesome" is a 1949 song recorded by Memphis Slim. It was his second major R&B chart hit after "Messin' Around".
