= Great Times! =

Compilation album by Duke Ellington & Billy Strayhorn
- Released: 1964
- Recorded: September 13, October 3 & November, 1950
- Genre: Jazz
- Length: 35:40
- Label: Riverside

Duke Ellington chronology
The Carnegie Hall Concerts: December 1947 (1947)	Great Times! (1964)	Masterpieces by Ellington (1951)

Billy Strayhorn chronology
Great Times! (1950)	Cue for Saxophone (1959)

Great Times! is an album by American pianist, composer and bandleader Duke Ellington. It features duet performances with his arranger and musical partner Billy Strayhorn originally recorded for the Mercer Records label in 1950, and later released on a 10" LP called Piano Duets. The sessions were re-released by Riverside as Great Times! in 1984 with tracks from an additional session with Oscar Pettiford.

== Reception ==
The AllMusic review by Scott Yanow called the album "quite fascinating... most memorable. Intriguing music".

Professional ratings
Review scores
Source	Rating
AllMusic	4/5 stars
The Penguin Guide to Jazz Recordings	3.5/4 stars

== Track listing ==
:All compositions by Duke Ellington except as indicated

1. "Cotton Tail" – 2:55
2. "C Jam Blues" (Barney Bigard, Ellington) – 2:58
3. "Flamingo" (Edmund Anderson, Ted Grouya) – 3:00
4. "Bang–Up Blues" – 3:08
5. "Tonk" (Ellington, Strayhorn) – 2:59
6. "Johnny Come Lately" (Strayhorn) – 3:01
7. "In a Blue Summer Garden" (Ellington, Strayhorn) – 4:06
8. "Great Times" – 2:56
9. "Perdido" (Juan Tizol) –2:57
10. "Take the "A" Train" (Strayhorn) – 2:20
11. "Oscalypso" (Oscar Pettiford) – 2:44
12. "Blues for Blanton" – 2:36

- Recorded in New York on September 13 (tracks 9–12), October 3 (tracks 5–8) & November (tracks 1–4), 1950

== Personnel ==
- Duke Ellington – piano
- Billy Strayhorn – piano (tracks 1–8), celeste (tracks 10 & 11)
- Oscar Pettiford – cello (tracks 9–12)
- Wendell Marshall (tracks 1–4), Joe Schulman (tracks 5–8), Lloyd Trotman (tracks 9–12) – bass
- Jo Jones (tracks 9–12), Unknown (tracks 1–4) – drums
