= Charlotte Enty Catlin =

American pianist (1903–1968)

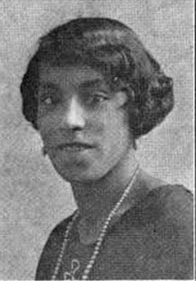
- Charlotte Enty Catlin, from a 1923 publication.
- Born: Charlotte Dyer Enty; 1903; Pittsburgh
- Died: November 13, 1968 (aged 64–65); Pittsburgh
- Occupations: Pianist, music educator

Charlotte Dyer Enty Catlin (1903 – November 13, 1968) was an American pianist based in Pittsburgh, Pennsylvania, who worked with Lena Horne. Among her piano students was jazz pianist and composer Billy Strayhorn.

== Early life ==
Charlotte Dyer Enty was born in Pittsburgh, Pennsylvania, the daughter of Clever "Frank" Enty and Mary Jane Little Enty. Her father was a contractor. Her mother played church organ. She completed an undergraduate degree in music education at Carnegie Institute of Technology in 1923, and was one of the eight founding members of the Alpha Kappa Alpha sorority's graduate chapter in Pittsburgh, in 1927.

== Career ==
Catlin taught piano at Volkwein's Music Store in Pittsburgh, served as music director at a dance school, and frequently entertained at society parties where Catlin also encouraged Lena Horne to accompany her with her singing. In 1924, she accompanied tenor Ruby Blakey at a music festival, and soprano Florence Cole Talbert at the People's Tabernacle. In 1925, she performed at an American Music Day event sponsored by the Outlook Alliance. She was active in the Society for Music Study, a music club in Pittsburgh. In 1934, she played music at a Bahá'i event in Pittsburgh. One of her students was Billy Strayhorn. She began accompanying Lena Horne in 1939.

In 1942, Catlin retired from her music career and began working for the City Recreation Bureau. She was director of the Ammon Recreation Center from 1950 until her death in 1968.

== Personal life ==
In 1931, Charlotte Enty married Charles William Catlin, a post office employee. In mid-life, Catlin was known for her distinctive hairstyle—parted center, with two coils of braids covering her ears. She died suddenly in November 1968, aged 65 years, in Pittsburgh.
