= The Rocking Tenor Sax of Eddie Chamblee =

Studio album by Eddie Chamblee
- Released: 1964
- Recorded: February 27, 1964
- Studio: Van Gelder Studio, Englewood Cliffs, New Jersey
- Genre: Jazz
- Length: 33:08
- Label: Prestige; PRLP 7321
- Producer: Ozzie Cadena

Eddie Chamblee chronology
Doodlin' (1958)	The Rocking Tenor Sax of Eddie Chamblee (1964)	Twenty Years After (1976)

The Rocking Tenor Sax of Eddie Chamblee is an album by saxophonist Eddie Chamblee which was recorded in 1963 and released on the Prestige label.

== Reception ==
Professional ratings
Review scores
Source	Rating
Allmusic	4/5 stars

The Allmusic site awarded the album 4 stars, stating, "The Rocking Tenor Sax of Eddie Chamblee finds him blowing with a leering, bump-and-grind swagger more ideally suited to a roadhouse strip joint than an uptown jazz club... it's not without good reason that the cover spells out "Rocking" entirely in capital letters".

== Track listing ==
All compositions by Eddie Chamblee except as noted

1. "The Honeydripper" (Joe Liggins) - 3:08
2. "You'll Never Walk Alone" (Oscar Hammerstein II, Richard Rodgers) - 4:24
3. "Softly, as I Leave You" (Antonio De Vita) - 4:03
4. "Bye Bye Blackbird" (Mort Dixon, Ray Henderson) - 4:27
5. "Champin'" - 2:39
6. "Skang!" - 6:05
7. "Soon" (George Gershwin, Ira Gershwin) - 3:11
8. "Little Things Mean a Lot" (Edith Lindeman, Carl Stutz) - 3:32

== Personnel ==
- Eddie Chamblee - tenor saxophone
- Dayton Selby - organ
- Al Griffin - drums
