= Alone with My Friends =

Studio album by Memphis Slim
- Released: 1963
- Recorded: April 25, 1961
- Studio: Levey's Sound, London
- Genre: Blues
- Label: Battle
- Producer: Ed Michel

Memphis Slim chronology
All Kinds of Blues (1962)	Alone with My Friends (1963)	Aux Trois Mailletz (1963)

Alone with My Friends is an album by American blues pianist Memphis Slim which was recorded in 1961 and released on the Battle label. The album, recorded in London during a European tour, is an exploration of the blues repertoire in terms of songs associated with blues singers Big Bill Broonzy, Tampa Red and Georgia Tom, Muddy Waters and Willie Dixon, Curtis Jones, St. Louis Jimmy, Sonny Boy Williamson and Blind Lemon Jefferson.

== Reception ==
Professional ratings
Review scores
Source	Rating
Allmusic	3/5 stars
The Penguin Guide to Blues Recordings	3/4 stars

In his review for Allmusic, Richie Unterberger says "Not the first or last place to check out Slim on record."

== Track listing ==
1. "Highway 51 Blues" (Curtis Jones) – 4:15
2. "I Feel So Good" (Big Bill Broonzy) – 2:45
3. "Rock Me, Momma" (Big Bill Broonzy) – 3:50
4. "Goin' Down Slow" (James B. Oden) – 3:40
5. "Sittin' on Top of the World" (Carter-Jacobs) – 3:40
6. "Sunnyland Train" (Memphis Slim) – 3:55
7. "Goin' Down to the River" (Blind Lemon Jefferson) – 3:00
8. "I Just Want to Make Love to You" (Willie Dixon) – 3:55
9. "I Can Hear My Name A-Ringin'" (Sonny Boy Williamson) – 4:00
10. "Going Back to My Plow" (Big Bill Broonzy) – 4:45

== Personnel ==
- Memphis Slim – vocals, piano
