= United Records =

US record label 1951–1957

- Founded: 1951
- Founder: Leonard Allen; Lew Simpkins
- Status: Defunct
- Genre: Blues, R&B
- Country of origin: United States
- Location: Chicago

United Records was an American record company and label founded in Chicago by Leonard Allen and Lew Simpkins in 1951.

United issued records by such artists as Tab Smith, Jimmy Forrest, Gene Ammons, Memphis Slim, Roosevelt Sykes, the Four Blazes, the Moroccos, Robert Anderson, and the Staple Singers.

In May 1952, United was joined by a sister label, States. United released 116 singles in a series that ran from 101 to 217, skipping 135 and 200. The company also released 2 10-inch LPs, but never got into 12-inch LPs. Tab Smith was United's biggest contributor. He laid down 85 tracks, releasing 24 singles (a fifth of the company's entire output) and United's first LP.

After the company closed in 1957, Savoy bought the masters by Gene Ammons and the Staple Singers. The rest of United's output was eventually acquired by Bob Koester of Delmark Records, which has made most of it available through LP and CD reissues.

== Releases ==
- U–101 – "Fine and Brown"/"Lucky Blues" – Roosevelt Sykes and his Honey Drippers
- U–102 – "Kansas City Blues"/"Crying Won't Help You" – Robert Nighthawk and his Nighthawks Band
- U–103 – "Windy City Boogie"/"Blackjack Blues" – "Nature Boy" Brown and his Blues Ramblers
- U–104 – "Because of You"/"Dee Jay Special" – Tab Smith His Fabulous Alto/His Velvet Tenor and Orchestra
- U–105 – "Feel So Bad"/"Take It Easy Baby" – Robert Nighthawk and his Nighthawks Band
- U–106 – "Rock 'em"/"When I Was a Lad" – "Nature Boy" Brown and his Blues Ramblers
- U–107 – "Can't We Take a Chance"/"(It's No) Sin" – Tab Smith His Fabulous Alto and Orchestra
- U–108 – "Hands across the Table"/"Boogie Joogie" – Tab Smith His Fabulous Alto and Orchestra
- U–109 – "Solitude"/"Rockin' the Blues Away" – Tiny Grimes His Guitar and Rocking Highlanders
- U–110 – "Night Train"/"Bolo Blues" – Jimmy Forrest, tenor and all star combo
- U–111 – "How I Got Over"/"Trusting in Jesus" – Robert Anderson and his Gospel Caravan
- U–112 – "Let's Get High"/"Strange Man" – Grant (Mr. Blues) Jones and his Orchestra
- U–113 – "Milk Train"/"Love Is a Wonderful Thing" – Tab Smith His Fabulous Alto and Orchestra
- U–114 – "Mary Jo"/"Mood Indigo" – Four Blazes
- U–115 – "Down Beat"/ "A Blanket of Blue"– Tab Smith His Velvet Tenor/His Fabulous Alto and Orchestra
- U–116 – "Big Horn Blues"/"Jockey Jack Boogie" – Johnny Wicks and his Swinging Ozarks
- U–117 – "When They Ring the Golden Bells"/"Satisfied" – Southern Tornadoes
- U–118 – "Sow Righteous Seeds"/"My Expectations" – Robert Anderson and his Gospel Caravan
- U–119 – "Big Dip"/"My Buddy" – Jimmy Forest, Tenor and All Star Combo
- U–120 – "Raining in My Hear"/"Heavy Heart" – Roosevelt Sykes and his Honey Drippers
- U–121 – "House Party Groove"/"Strictly Gone" – Nature Boy Brown and his Blues Ramblers
- U–122 – "Come in the Room"/"How Could It Be" – Robert Anderson and his Gospel Caravan
- U–123 – "Toll the Bell Easy"/"How about You" – Southern Tornadoes
- U–124 – "A Bit of Blues"/"Sunnyside of the Street" – Tab Smith His Fabulous Alto and Orchestra
- U–125 – "Night Train"/"Rug Cutter" – Four Blazes
- U–126 – "Glasgow KY Blues"/"Blue Dawn" – Johnny Wicks and his Swinging Ozarks
- U–127 – "Please Send Her Back to Me"/"Stop Boogie Woogie" – Four Blazes
- U–128 – "Dinah"/"Hora Staccato" – Ray McKinstry
- U–129 – "Security Blues"/"Walkin' This Boogie" – Roosevelt Sykes (The Honeydripper)
- U–130 – "Hey Mrs. Jones"/""Blue Groove" – Jimmy Forrest and Orchestra
- U–131 – "You Belong to Me"/"Auf Wiederseh'n Sweetheart" – Tab Smith His Fabulous Alto and Orchestra
- U–132 – "Nicotine Fits"/"It's All Your Fault" – Tiny Murphy and his Bar 69 Boys
- U–133 – "In the Dark"/"Hello Stranger" – Grant (Mr. Blues) Jones and his Orchestra (Grant Jones (voc) with Red Saunders (d, ldr); Sonny Cohn (tp -1); Riley Hampton (as); Leon Washington (ts -1); McKinley Easton (bars -1); Earl Washington (p); Jimmy Richardson (b).) Recorded at the Universal Recording studios, Chicago, October 7, 1952.
- U–134 – "O Lord Is It I"/"Pleading in Glory for Me" – Robert Anderson and his Gospel Caravan
- U–136 – "Dangerous Ground"/"Hot Steel" – Tiny Murphy and the Bar 69 Boys
- U–137 – "Street of Dreams"/"The Beat" – Gene Ammons His Golden Toned Tenor and Orchestra
- U–138 – "Living the Life I Love"/"Back Alley" – Memphis Slim and his House Rockers
- U–139 – "Four O'Clock Blues"/"To [sic] Hot to Hold" – Roosevelt Sykes and His Honeydrippers
- U–140 – "Red Hot and Blue"/"These Foolish Things" – Tab Smith His Fabulous Alto and Orchestra
- U–141 – "Leo's Boogie"/"Cool Leo" – Leo Parker
- U–142 – "You Foxie Thing"/"Smooth Rocking" – Billy Ford and His Night Riders
- U–143 – "Linger Awhile"/"I Keep Thinking of You" – The Dozier Boys Featuring Voices and Alto
- U–144 – "Don't Make Me Cry"/"Love Me Please Love Me" – Debbie Andrews and The Musketeers
- U–145 – "Mrs. Jones' Daughter"/"Mr. Goodbeat" – Jimmy Forrest His Tenor and All Star Combo
- U–146 – "Not Any More Tears"/"My Hat's on the Side of My Head" – The Four Blazes
- U–147 – "Cuban Boogie"/"My Mother's Eyes" – Tab Smith His Fabulous Alto and Orchestra
- U–148 – "With All My Heart"/"Why Should I Cry" – Johnny Holiday – Arranged and Conducted by Dennis Farnow [sic]
- U–149 – "Red Top"/"Just Chips" – Gene Ammons His Golden Toned Tenor and Orchestra
- U–150 – "Ebony after Midnight"/"My Sympathy" – Tasso the Great and his Combo
- U–151 – "Brazil"/"Blues for Lew" – Chris Woods and his Orchestra
- U–152 – "Tell Me True"/"Come Back Baby" – Roosevelt Sykes and his Honeydrippers
- U–153 – "Cherry"/"I've Had the Blues All Day" – Tab Smith His Fabulous Alto and Orchestra
- U–154 – "Call Me Darling"/"Please Wait for Me" – Debbie Andrews – Arr. and Conducted by Remo Biondi
- U–155 – "I'm Still in Love with You"/"Never to Cry Again" – Bixie Crawford
- U–156 – "Five O'Clock Blues"/"The Come Back" – Memphis Slim and his House Rockers
- U–157 – "Riding with the Blues"/"Stop Feeling Sorry for Yourself" – Nelda Dupuy and Ike Perkins Orchestra
- U–158 – "Perfect Woman"/"Ella Louise" – Four Blazes
- U–159 – "Don't Pay to Gamble"/"Stompin' at the Savoy" – The Mil–Con–Bo Trio
- U–160 – "Walkin' Home"/"Lonesome Road"– The Rockin' and Walkin' Rhythm of Eddie Chamblee
- U–161 – "My Last Cry"/"Hold Me" – Terry Timmons
- U–162 – "This Love of Mine"/"All My Life" – Tab Smith His Fabulous Alto and Orchestra
- U–163 – "Early Morning Blues"/"Cold, Cold Rain" – The Dozier Boys
- U–164 – "Stairway to the Stars"/"Jim Dawgs" – Gene Ammons
- U–165 – "Won't You Sit Down"/"It Rained Children" – The Staple Singers
- U–166 – "Call before You Go Home"/"This Is My Lucky Day" – Memphis Slim and His House Rockers
- U–167 – "Confessin'"/"Old Age" – Billy Ford and His Night Riders
- U–168 – "My Great Love Affair"/"All Night Long' – The Four Blazes
- U–169 – "Honky Tonk Angels"/"Blue Roses" – Tiny Murphy
- U–170 – "Tiny's Boogie"/"Blue Roundup" – Tiny Grimes
- U–171 – "Jumptime"/"Strange" – Tab Smith His Fabulous Alto and Orchestra
- U–172 – "Tell Me"/"Whoo–wee Baby" – The Five C's
- U–173 – "Sophisticated Lady"/"Flight 3–D" – Jimmy Forrest and His All Star Combo
- U–174 – "My Baby"/"Rock City" – Tab Smith His Fabulous Alto and Orchestra
- U–175 – "Big Slam Part I"/"Big Slam Part II" – Gene Ammons His Golden Toned Tenor and Orchestra
- U–176 – "Wish Me Well"/"Sassy Mae" – Memphis Slim and His House Rockers
- U–177 – "Do the Do"/"Did You Ever See a Monkey Play a Fiddle" – Tommy (Mary Jo) Braden and his Flames
- U–178 – "Ace High"/"How Long Has It Been" – Tab Smith His Fabulous Alto and Orchestra
- U–179 – "L'Odore della Rosa"/"I Remember" – Buddy diVito and Howard Zuegner's Orchestra
- U–180 – "Goody, Goody"/"My Heart's Got the Blues" – The Five C's
- U–181 – "Come On In"/"La! La! La! Lady" – The Rockin' and Walkin' Rhythm of Eddie Chamblee
- U–182 – "Four Years of Torment"/"I Love My Baby" – Memphis Slim and his House Rockers
- U–183 – "Southern Women"/"Remember Me" – Tommy Brown and his Combo
- U–184 – "In a Little Spanish Town"/"Mr. Gee" – Tab Smith His Fabulous Alto and Orchestra
- U–185 – "Traveling Light"/"Fuzzy" – Gene Ammons his Golden Toned Tenor and Orchestra
- U–186 – "Memphis Slim U.S.A."/"Blues All around My Head" – Memphis Slim and his House Rockers
- U–187 – "Tabolino"/"Cottage for Sale" – Tab Smith His Fabulous Alto and Orchestra
- U–188 – "Pardon My Tears"/"Chicken" – The Moroccos
- U–189 – "She's Alright"/"Two of a Kind" – Memphis Slim and his House Rockers
- U–190 – "Top "n" Bottom"/"For Only You" – Tab Smith and Orchestra
- U–191 – "She Needs to Be Loved"/"Done Got Over" – The Blazers & Tommy (Mary Jo) Braden
- U–192 – "Matilda"/"Liza's Blues" – Paul Bascomb
- U–193 – "Red Hots and Chili Mac"/"Somewhere over the Rainbow" – The Moroccos
- U–194 – "The Long Man"/"I'm a Lover" – Long Man Binder and his Thin Men
- U–195 – "Mean to Me"/"Spider's Web" – Tab Smith His Fabulous Alto and Combo
- U–196 – "Boom De De Boom"/"Put Your Arms around Me" – The Pastels
- U–197 – "Whose Heart Are You Breaking"/"Story Love" – The DiMara Sisters
- U–198 – "Mozelle"/"Sherry" – The Sheppards
- U–199 – "T.G. Blues"/"Hurricane T" – Tab Smith His Fabulous Alto and Combo
- U–201 – "Blue and Lonesome"/"Got to Find My Baby" – Memphis Slim and his House Rockers
- U–202 – "Man beyond the Clouds"/"I'm Heaven Bound" – Singing Sammy Lewis
- U–203 – "Yo Yo Blues"/"Feel like I Wanna Die" – Tab Smith and Orchestra
- U–204 – "Bang Goes My Heart"/"What Is a Teen–Ager's Prayer" – The Moroccos
- U–205 – "Pretend"/"Crazy Walk" – Tab Smith His Fabulous Alto/Featuring the Tenor and Orchestra
- U–206 – "Chicago Cha Cha"/"Someone Will Understand" – Lefty Bates and his Band
- U–207 – "Sad Sad Hours"/"The Hex" – The Moroccos – Lefty Bates Band
- U–208 – "Tear Drops"/"Edna" – The Palms and Lefty Bates Band
- U–209 – "Someone to Watch over Me"/"Soft Breeze" – Tab Smith
- U–210 – "Shadow Blues"/"Honey Hush" – John Hampton and his Band
- U–211 – "My Mother's Eyes"/"Dansero" – Tab Smith His Fabulous Alto and His Band
- U–212 – "Have No Fear"/"Keeps Me Worried All the Time" – The Answers and Lefty Bates Band
- U–213 – "Enchantment"/"Umbé" – Jack Medell and his Orchestra
- U–214 – "Hi De Ho Rock and Roll"/"Let's Change the Alphabet" – Loretta Thompson and Her Rockers
- U–215 – "Western Union"/"Why Don't You Believe Me" – Don Reed
- U–216 – "Merry Christmas Window"/"I Don't Want to Be the Last on Santa's List" – Carol, Linda, and Cathy
- U–217 – "Just One More Time"/"Mambolino" – Tab Smith His Fabulous Alto and Orchestra

== See also ==
- List of record labels
