= The Legacy of the Blues Vol. 7 =

Studio album by Memphis Slim
- Released: 1973
- Recorded: 1967
- Studio: New York City
- Genre: Blues
- Length: 32:01
- Label: Sonet
- Producer: Clyde Otis

Memphis Slim chronology
South Side Reunion (1972)	The Legacy of the Blues Vol. 7 (1973)	Favorite Blues Singers (1973)

The Legacy of the Blues Vol. 7 is an album by American blues pianist Memphis Slim which was recorded in 1967 and released on the Swedish Sonet label.

== Reception ==
Professional ratings
Review scores
Source	Rating
Allmusic	3/5 stars
The Penguin Guide to Blues Recordings	3/4 stars

In his review for Allmusic, Nathan Bush says "Throughout the set, Slim is happy to lend the spotlight to his sidemen, working the 88s behind Eddie Chamblee's tenor solo on 'I Am the Blues' and Billy Butler's guitar on 'Ballin' the Jack.' Even in these situations however, the pianist is dazzling and his commentary always worth paying attention to."

== Track listing ==
All compositions by Peter Chapman

1. "Everyday (I Have the Blues)" – 2:58
2. "I Am the Blues" – 2:49
3. "A Long Time Gone" – 2:35
4. "I Feel Like Ballin' the Jack" – 2:27
5. "Strange, Strange Feeling (Let's Get with It)" – 2:26
6. "Only Fools Have Fun" – 2:51
7. "Broadway Boogie" – 3:05
8. "Gambler's Blues" – 4:06
9. "Freedom" – 5:55
10. "Sassy Mae" – 2:39

== Personnel ==
- Memphis Slim – vocals, piano
- Billy Butler – guitar
- Eddie Chamblee – tenor sax
- Lloyd Trotman – bass
- Herb Lavelle – drums
