= Legend of the Blues Vol. 1 =

Studio album by Memphis Slim
- Released: 1967
- Genre: Blues
- Length: 36:01
- Label: Jubilee; JGS-8003
- Producer: Clyde Otis

Memphis Slim chronology
Clap Your Hands (1964)	Legend of the Blues Vol. 1 (1967)	Bluesingly Yours (1967)

Legend of the Blues Vol. 1 is an album by American blues pianist Memphis Slim which was released in 1967 on the Jubilee label. The album was reissued on CD in 2008 by Wounded Bird Records.

== Reception ==
Professional ratings
Review scores
Source	Rating
Allmusic	3.5/5 stars

In his review for Allmusic, William Ruhlmann says "Memphis Slim shows off his piano abilities on the instrumental 'Broadway Boogie,' but otherwise the ensemble supports him with jazz-blues arrangements for his smooth and authoritative vocals."

== Track listing ==
All compositions by Peter Chapman

1. "Little Lonely Girl" – 2:16
2. "Gone Again" – 4:14
3. "Forty Years Or More" – 4:44
4. "All By Myself" – 2:16
5. "Broadway Boogie" – 3:07
6. "Lend Me Your Love" – 5:00
7. "Ramble This Highway" – 2:57
8. "I Feel Like Ballin' the Jack" – 2:29
9. "Rock Me Woman" – 5:18
10. "This Little Woman" – 3:40

== Personnel ==
- Memphis Slim – vocals, piano
- Billy Butler – guitar
- Herb Lavelle – drums
- Lloyd Trotman – bass
- Eddie Chamblee – tenor sax
