= Lynn Hope =

American jazz musician

Lynn Hope, also known as El Hajj Abdullah Rasheed Ahmad, (September 26, 1926 – February 24, 1993) was an American jazz and blues tenor saxophonist.

He was born in Birmingham, Alabama, United States. Hope was noted for his instrumental remakes of established pre-rock pop anthems. Hope joined King Kolax's band when he graduated from high school in Birmingham during the 1940s. After converting to Islam, he became noted for wearing a turban or fez.

Hope signed with Miracle Records in 1950, but the contract proved invalid. He moved to Premium Records, where he recorded "Tenderly," a song that was later picked up by Chess Records. Hope recorded often for Aladdin Records between 1951 and 1957, doing such reworked standards as "September Song" and "Summertime." These numbers were often performed with little or no melodic embellishment or improvisation; however the B-sides were often up tempo blues or jump tunes. "Tenderly" earned Hope his only hit in 1950, reaching number eight on the US Billboard R&B chart and number 19 on the pop music chart.

Hope recorded his last sessions for King in 1960, but then seemingly left the music industry.

Hope died in February 1993, at the age of 66, in Collingswood, New Jersey, United States.
