= Angel Child (traditional song) =

Folk song

"Angel Child" is a traditional song from the Texas repertoire. The song was recorded by Memphis Slim (1948), Lightnin' Hopkins and Mance Lipscomb, and Guitar Slim Green.
