= Love for Sale (book) =

Love for Sale: Pop Music in America
- Author: David Hajdu
- Language: English
- Subject: Music, pop music, music history
- Genre: Non-fiction criticism, interpretation
- Publisher: Farrar, Straus and Giroux
- Publication date: October 18, 2016
- Publication place: United States
- Media type: Print (hardcover), print (paperback), ebook
- Pages: 320
- ISBN: 978-0-374-17053-0
- OCLC: 947041885
- Preceded by: Heroes and Villains: Essays on Music, Movies, Comics, and Culture
- Website: Love for Sale at DavidHajdu.com

Love for Sale: Pop Music in America is a 2016 book by The Nation music critic David Hajdu, in which he chronicles the 100-plus year history of pop music in the United States. The book features previously published material as well as interviews, including an interview with legendary folk singer Dave Van Ronk. Chronologically, Love for Sale takes the reader from the origins of ragtime in the 19th century through to the present era of streaming music. The author also sequential discusses the rise of tapes, CDs, and MP3s. The title of the book is derived from the 1930 Cole Porter song of the same name.

Love for Sale constitutes Hajdu's attempt to answer the question: “What is the history and meaning of pop music?”

== Reception ==
The New York Times gave the book a generally favorable review, calling it, "very educational and entertaining". Still, the review cautioned that, "If [the book] were an album, it would be a collection of singles and B-sides meant to hold the fans at bay until the next major release." The Boston Globe described Love for Sale as, "idiosyncratic romp through the history of the American popular music industry." The book was favorably reviewed by the Wall Street Journal, Associated Press and Vanity Fair, among others.
