= Billy Strayhorn =

American jazz pianist, composer, lyricist, and arranger (1915–1967)

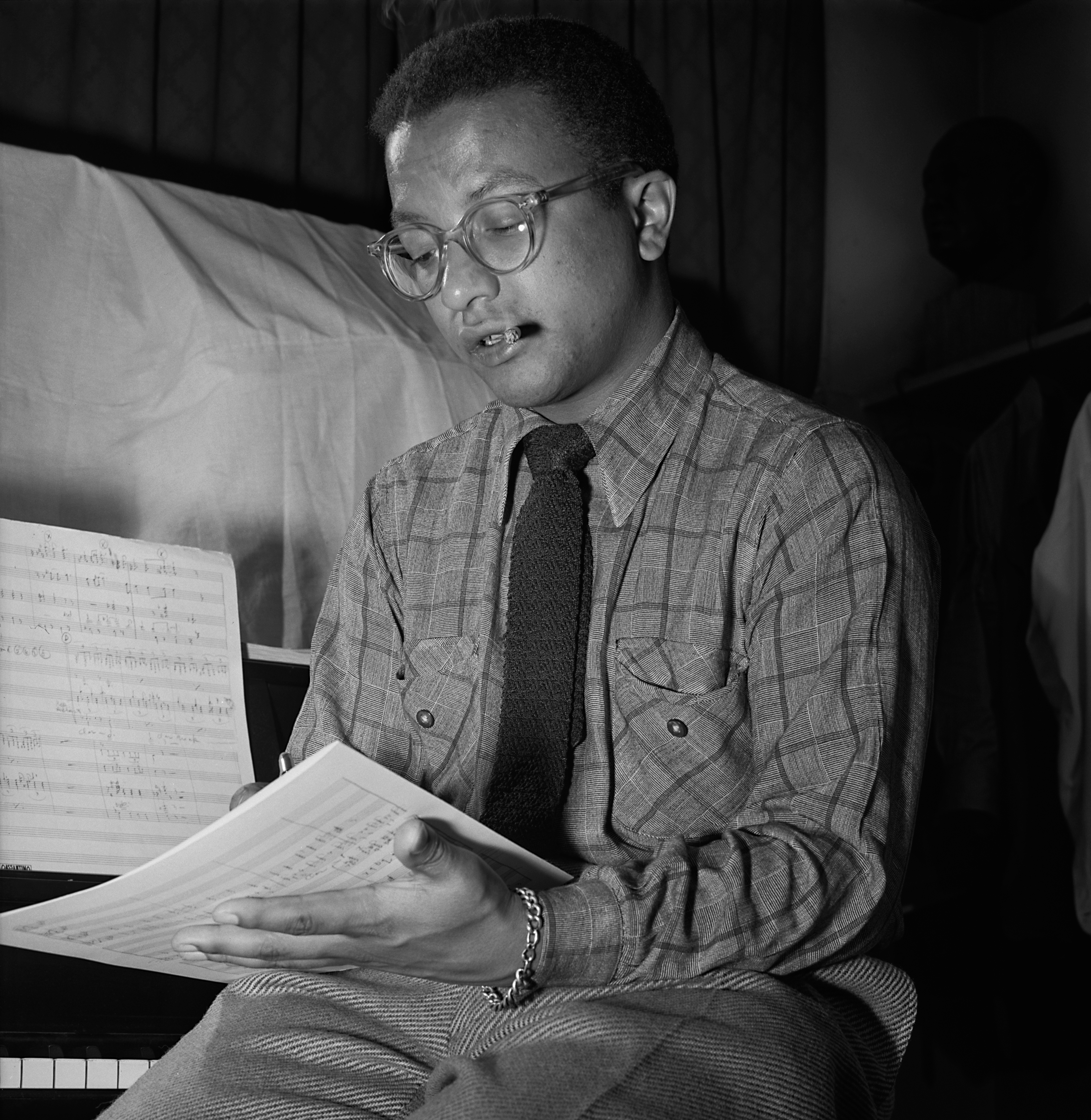
- Strayhorn c. 1947; by William P. Gottlieb

Background information
- Born: William Thomas Strayhorn; November 29, 1915; Dayton, Ohio, U.S.
- Died: May 31, 1967 (aged 51) New York City, U.S.
- Genres: Jazz; swing; classical
- Occupations: Musician; composer; lyricist; arranger
- Instrument: Piano
- Years active: 1934–1964
- Labels: United Artists; Felsted; Mercer
- Website: billystrayhorn.com

William Thomas Strayhorn (November 29, 1915 – May 31, 1967) was an American jazz composer, pianist, lyricist, and arranger who collaborated with bandleader and composer Duke Ellington for nearly three decades. His compositions include "Take the 'A' Train", "Chelsea Bridge", "A Flower Is a Lovesome Thing", and "Lush Life".

== Early life ==
Strayhorn was born in Dayton, Ohio, United States. His family then moved to the Homewood neighborhood of Pittsburgh, Pennsylvania. His mother's family came from Hillsborough, North Carolina, and she sent him there to protect him from his father's drunken rages. Strayhorn spent many months of his childhood at his grandparents' house in Hillsborough. In an interview, Strayhorn said that his grandmother was his primary influence during the first ten years of his life. He became interested in music while living with her, playing hymns on her piano and listening to records on her Victrola record player.

== Return to Pittsburgh and meeting Ellington ==
Strayhorn returned to Pittsburgh while still in grade school. He worked odd jobs to earn enough money to buy his first piano and took lessons from Charlotte Enty Catlin. He attended Westinghouse High School, later also attended by jazz pianists Erroll Garner and Ahmad Jamal. He played in the school band, and studied under Carl McVicker, who had also instructed Erroll Garner and Mary Lou Williams. He studied classical music for a time at the Pittsburgh Music Institute, writing a musical, forming a trio that played daily on a local radio station, and writing/composing the songs "Life Is Lonely" (later renamed "Lush Life"), "My Little Brown Book", and "Something to Live For". By age 19, he was writing for a professional musical, Fantastic Rhythm.

Strayhorn's original ambition to become a classical composer was foiled by the harsh reality of a black man trying to make it in the classical world, which at that time was almost completely dominated by white people. Strayhorn was introduced to the music of pianists like Art Tatum and Teddy Wilson at age 19. The artistic influence of these musicians guided him into the realm of jazz, where he remained for the rest of his life. His first jazz exposure was in a combo called the Mad Hatters that played around Pittsburgh. Strayhorn's fellow students, guitarist Bill Esch and drummer Mickey Scrima, also influenced his transition to jazz, and he began writing arrangements for Buddy Malone's Pittsburgh dance band after 1937.

Strayhorn saw Duke Ellington play in Pittsburgh in 1933, then met him in December 1938 after Ellington performed there again. He first explained, and then showed the bandleader how he would have arranged one of Ellington's own pieces. Ellington was impressed enough to invite other band members to hear Strayhorn. As jazz historian and critic Ted Gioia notes, "The piece that caught Ellington's attention that night, 'Lush Life,' stands out as one of the greatest jazz ballads, with its yearning melody line and the haunting poetry of its lyrics, supported by sweeping harmonies more characteristic of classical music than of Tin Pan Alley." At the end of the visit, Ellington arranged for Strayhorn to meet him when the band returned to New York. Strayhorn worked for Ellington for the next 25 years as an arranger, composer, occasional pianist, and collaborator until his death from cancer. As Ellington described him, "Billy Strayhorn was my right arm, my left arm, all the eyes in the back of my head, my brain waves in his head, and his in mine."

== Working with Ellington ==
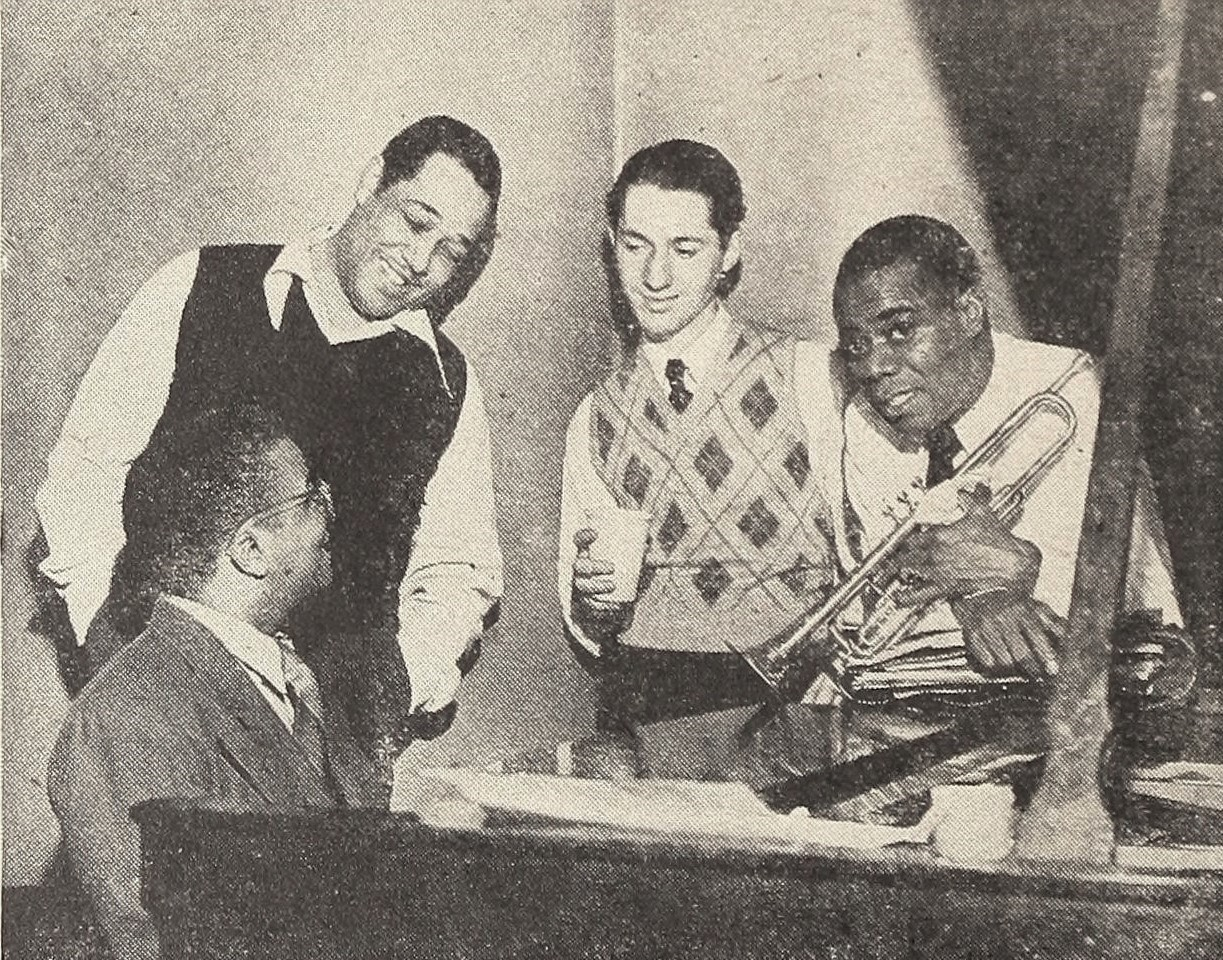
Strayhorn (seated at piano) and (from left) Duke Ellington, Leonard Feather, and Louis Armstrong in 1947

Strayhorn was a gifted composer and arranger who seemed to flourish in Ellington's shadow. Ellington was arguably a father figure and the band was affectionately protective of the diminutive and mild-mannered Strayhorn, nicknamed by the band "Strays", "Weely", and "Swee' Pea". Ellington used Strayhorn to complete his thoughts and introduce new musical ideas (and sometimes it worked the other way around), while giving him the freedom to write on his own and enjoy at least some credit. Although Ellington took credit for some of Strayhorn's work, he did not maliciously drown out his partner. Ellington would make jokes onstage like, "Strayhorn does a lot of the work, but I get to take the bows!" On the other hand, Ellington did not oppose his publicists' habit of frequently crediting him without any mention of Strayhorn, and, despite the latter's attempts to hide his dissatisfaction, "Strayhorn revealed", at least to his friends, "a deepening well of unease about his lack of public recognition as Ellington's prominence grew."

After joining the orchestra, Strayhorn began going through scores with Ellington, "really studying them", and "began to crack the code to the master's style or—as the young man would later dub it—the 'Ellington effect.'" Ellington's biographer John Edward Hasse notes,

Strayhorn so mastered the Ellington style of composing that the two became uncannily close musical collaborators, yet in their personal lives they were opposites. While the handsome, six-foot-one-inch Ellington moved through life with dash and theatricality, a charismatic and imposing presence wherever he went, both charming and manipulating people, bedding many women along the way, the cherubic Strayhorn was short (five feet, three inches tall), shy, soft-spoken, bespectacled, modest, and homosexual. Despite their different personalities, they formed an exceedingly close musical and working relationship that would end only with Strayhorn's death.

Strayhorn became part of the Ellington organization just before it hit what many regard as its peak years in 1940 and 1941, after Ellington also hired two other crucial members: the bassist Jimmy Blanton, who despite his short life revolutionized jazz playing on his instrument, and the great tenor saxophonist Ben Webster. As Strayhorn biographer David Hajdu puts it, "With the Blanton–Webster band under him and Strayhorn submitting ambitious work, a freshly challenged Ellington reached a watershed of his own. The compositions he was recording in the early 1940s ... mark an invigorated master working at his resolute best." In his History of Jazz, Ted Gioia observes, "The Ellington recorded legacy from the beginning of the 1940s is extraordinarily rich. The Victor sides from this period rank with the finest achievements of the jazz idiom." The three new members of the band bonded, becoming close friends and sometimes playing together as a trio.

During this period, Strayhorn composed the Duke Ellington Orchestra's famous signature song, "Take the 'A' Train" (first recorded in 1941), and a number of other pieces that became an integral part of the band's repertoire. In some cases, Strayhorn received full attribution for his work, such as "Raincheck" (1941), "Chelsea Bridge" (1941), "A Flower Is a Lovesome Thing" (1941), "After All" (1942), "Johnny Come Lately" (1942), "My Little Brown Book" (1944), "Passion Flower" (1944), and "Lotus Blossom" (1946), whereas other pieces of his, such as "Something to Live For" (1939), "Grievin'" (1939), "Day Dream" (1940), and "Just A-Sittin' and A-Rockin" (1941), were listed as collaborations with Ellington. Strayhorn also composed but was not credited for the "Sugar Hill Penthouse" section of Ellington's lengthy work Black, Brown and Beige (1943). Strayhorn arranged many of Ellington's band-within-a-band recordings and, with his extensive background in classical music, provided harmonic clarity and polish to Duke's compositions. In addition, Strayhorn often played the piano with the Ellington orchestra, both live and in the studio, particularly on recordings of his own works like "Raincheck" and "Chelsea Bridge".

As a pianist, Strayhorn had a formidable reputation among his colleagues. In the 1940s, he engaged in a cutting competition with Bud Powell, and Dizzy Gillespie, who witnessed the contest, said of Strayhorn, "[M]an, I'm telling you, he turned that piano inside out." Max Roach added that on another occasion at Minton's Playhouse, various pianists were taking turns playing for the audience, but after Strayhorn played, "nobody would go to the piano after him. He was that good."

In 1950, Strayhorn helped Ellington fashion the extended, complex new "concert" arrangements of 1930s classics "Mood Indigo", "Sophisticated Lady", and "(In My) Solitude", along with the more recent tone poem "The Tattooed Bride", for Ellington's first LP, Masterpieces by Ellington. Strayhorn and Ellington both played piano on the album, but Strayhorn's contributions as an arranger were not acknowledged. Likewise uncredited, Strayhorn contributed approximately 30 seconds of music to Ellington's 14-minute "A Tone Parallel to Harlem" (1951). Ellington did give Strayhorn full credit as his collaborator on later large-scale works such as A Drum Is a Woman (1956), Such Sweet Thunder (1957), The Perfume Suite (1957), and the Far East Suite (1966), on which Strayhorn and Ellington worked closely together.

In 1954, Strayhorn fleshed out an Ellington riff sketch, adding harmony and lyrics, for what would become Ellington's last single-record hit of his career, "Satin Doll". Strayhorn's lyrics, however, were replaced with new ones by Johnny Mercer, and the original lyrics do not survive. Strayhorn undertook a special assignment in 1956, working with singer Rosemary Clooney on the album Blue Rose. The Ellington Orchestra recorded the instrumental tracks in New York, and then Strayhorn went out to Los Angeles to supervise Clooney's overdubbed vocals. However, Clooney was heavily pregnant at the time and constantly suffering from nausea, and she found the recording process extremely difficult. Strayhorn said to her, "Listen to me, honey. You're in your house, and you're sitting in your room. You turn the radio on—and it's Duke Ellington! That's great! You love Duke Ellington. So you start singing along. You're brushing your hair. You're looking in the mirror, and you're singing along to the radio. Okay?" Clooney said, "And that did it for me. I was all right from then on". In a retrospective review, AllMusic said, "The results are stunning .... [Clooney] easily ranks as one of the greatest vocalists to appear on record with the maestro."

Some of Strayhorn's notable compositions from the 1950s include "All Day Long" (1951), "Boo-Dah" (1953), "Pretty Girl" (a.k.a. "The Star-Crossed Lovers", 1956), "Snibor" (1956), and "Upper Manhattan Medical Group" (a.k.a. "U.M.M.G.", 1956), all of which were properly credited to Strayhorn.

Detroit Free Press music critic Mark Stryker concludes that the work of Strayhorn and Ellington on the score of the 1959 Hollywood film Anatomy of a Murder—a classic courtroom drama directed by Otto Preminger and starring Jimmy Stewart—is "indispensable, [although] ... too sketchy to rank in the top echelon among Ellington–Strayhorn masterpiece suites like Such Sweet Thunder and Far East Suite, but its most inspired moments are their equal." Film historians have recognized the soundtrack "as a landmark—the first significant Hollywood film music by African Americans comprising non-diegetic music, that is, music whose source is not visible or implied by action in the film, like an on-screen band." The score "avoided the cultural stereotypes that previously characterized jazz scores and rejected a strict adherence to visuals in ways that presaged the New Wave cinema of the '60s."

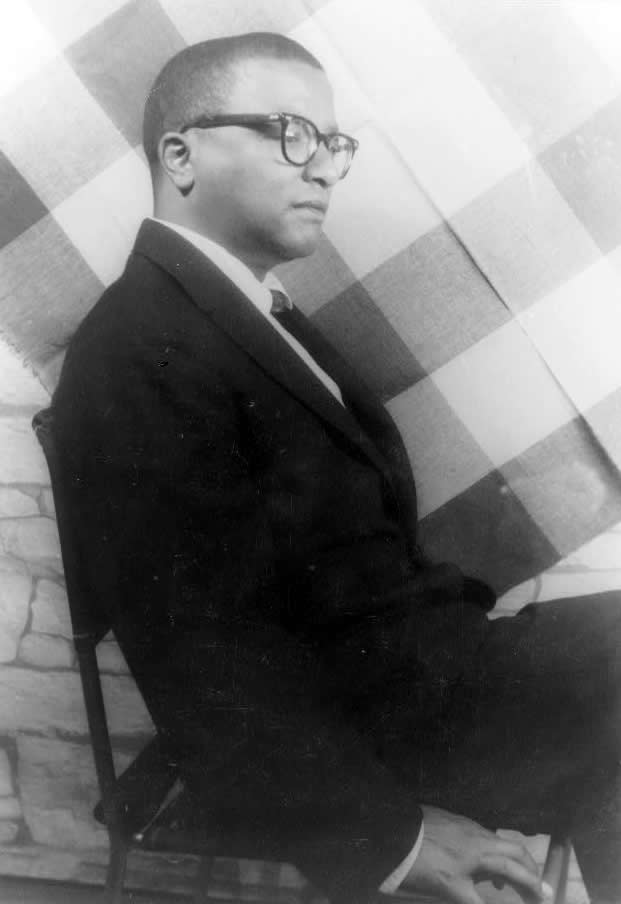
Strayhorn in 1958; by Carl Van Vechten

In 1960, the two collaborated on arrangements for the album The Nutcracker Suite, recorded for Columbia Records and featuring jazz interpretations of "The Nutcracker" by Tchaikovsky. The original album cover is notable for the inclusion of Strayhorn's name and picture along with Ellington's on the front.

The following year, Ellington and Strayhorn traveled to Paris to compose the score for another film, Martin Ritt's Paris Blues (1961), the screenplay for which initially concerned two interracial relationships; however, in the process of making the film, this theme was abandoned for a more conventional presentation, disappointing both the composers and the film's stars, Paul Newman and Sidney Poitier. Strayhorn's "weakness for Paris life" often left Ellington working on the score alone, and Strayhorn was not acknowledged in the film's credits, even though the opening music in the movie is "Take the 'A' Train". A JazzTimes review by Ellington's friend Stanley Dance was critical of both the film and the score, but the latter was nominated for an Oscar. While in Paris, Strayhorn made his most important recording away from the Ellington orchestra, The Peaceful Side (United Artists, released 1963).

Another significant project Strayhorn undertook apart from Ellington during this period is the album Johnny Hodges with Billy Strayhorn and the Orchestra, in which Hodges plays as featured soloist with Ellington's orchestra but without Ellington himself. Strayhorn arranged and conducted the music, and Jimmy Jones played the piano. Producer Creed Taylor said he wanted to showcase "Strayhorn's compositional and arranging colors, those gorgeous, liquid, dreamlike colors. ... I gave him free rein, and he produced a beautiful record."

In June 1965, with less than two years to live, Strayhorn, through the auspices of the Duke Ellington Jazz Society, gave the first and only concert as a leader of his career to a sold-out audience—including many notable jazz musicians—at the 450-seat New School auditorium. The program was divided into three parts: a solo piano set, a trio set with bassist Wendell Marshall and drummer Dave Bailey, and then a small-combo set with a few members of the Ellington orchestra, including Clark Terry. Pianist Randy Weston, who attended the concert, said, "I had known he was good, but I didn't know he was that fantastic a pianist until that concert. He blew the hall away." The concert also received a rave review from critic Dan Morgenstern in DownBeat: "Everything he plays is invested with a rare sense of form and development, and there is none of the empty rhapsodizing to which some of his melodies and harmonies lend themselves in lesser hands."

Between January 1964 and August 1965, Strayhorn made his final recordings as a leader, including small-group sessions, accompaniment of the vocalist Ozzie Bailey, and solo piano recordings. These are collected on the 1992 Red Baron CD Billy Strayhorn: Lush Life.

Ellington and Strayhorn completed their final major collaboration, the Far East Suite, in 1966, while Strayhorn's health was going into serious decline. Ellington biographer John Edward Hasse notes that "the suite is regarded by some as their best work since the early 1940s." However, the album was not released until the month after Strayhorn died.

Composer and author Gunther Schuller wrote, "Ellington and Strayhorn's musical collaboration has been unique in the history of music, both in kind and quality. (The only other example that comes to mind in terms of quality is that of Gil Evans and Miles Davis.) But in the case of Ellington and Strayhorn—both were composer-arrangers and pianists—the match is so close that it is frequently impossible to tell with certainty where the work of one ends and the other's begins."

== Personal life ==
Shortly before going on his second European tour with his orchestra, from March to May 1939, Ellington announced to his sister Ruth and son Mercer Ellington that Strayhorn "is staying with us." Through Mercer, Strayhorn met his first partner, African-American musician Aaron Bridgers, with whom Strayhorn lived until Bridgers moved to Paris in 1947.

As an adult, Strayhorn was openly gay to his friends and the members of the Ellington band. He participated in the civil rights movement, and as a friend to Martin Luther King Jr., he arranged and conducted "King Fit the Battle of Alabam'" for the Ellington orchestra in 1963 for the historical revue (and album) My People, dedicated to King.

Strayhorn had a major influence on the career of Lena Horne, who wanted to marry Strayhorn and considered him the love of her life. Strayhorn used his classical background to improve Horne's singing technique, and they recorded songs together. In the 1950s, Strayhorn left Ellington for a few years to pursue a solo career of his own. He released a few solo albums and revues for the Original Copasetics and took on theater productions with his friend Luther Henderson.

== Illness and death ==
Strayhorn died in New York City on May 31, 1967, aged 51, after battling esophageal cancer for three years. His partner, Bill Grove, was with Strayhorn at the time of his death; he did not die in Lena Horne's arms, as has often been falsely reported. By her own account, she was touring in Europe when she received the news of Strayhorn's death. His ashes were scattered in the Hudson River by a gathering of his closest friends.

While in the hospital, he submitted his final composition to Ellington; "Blood Count" was used as the third track in Ellington's memorial album for Strayhorn, ...And His Mother Called Him Bill, which was recorded several months after Strayhorn's death. The last track of the album is a solo version of "Lotus Blossom" performed by Ellington, who sat at the piano and played it while the band (who can be heard in the background) were packing up after the formal end of the recording session.

== Legacy ==
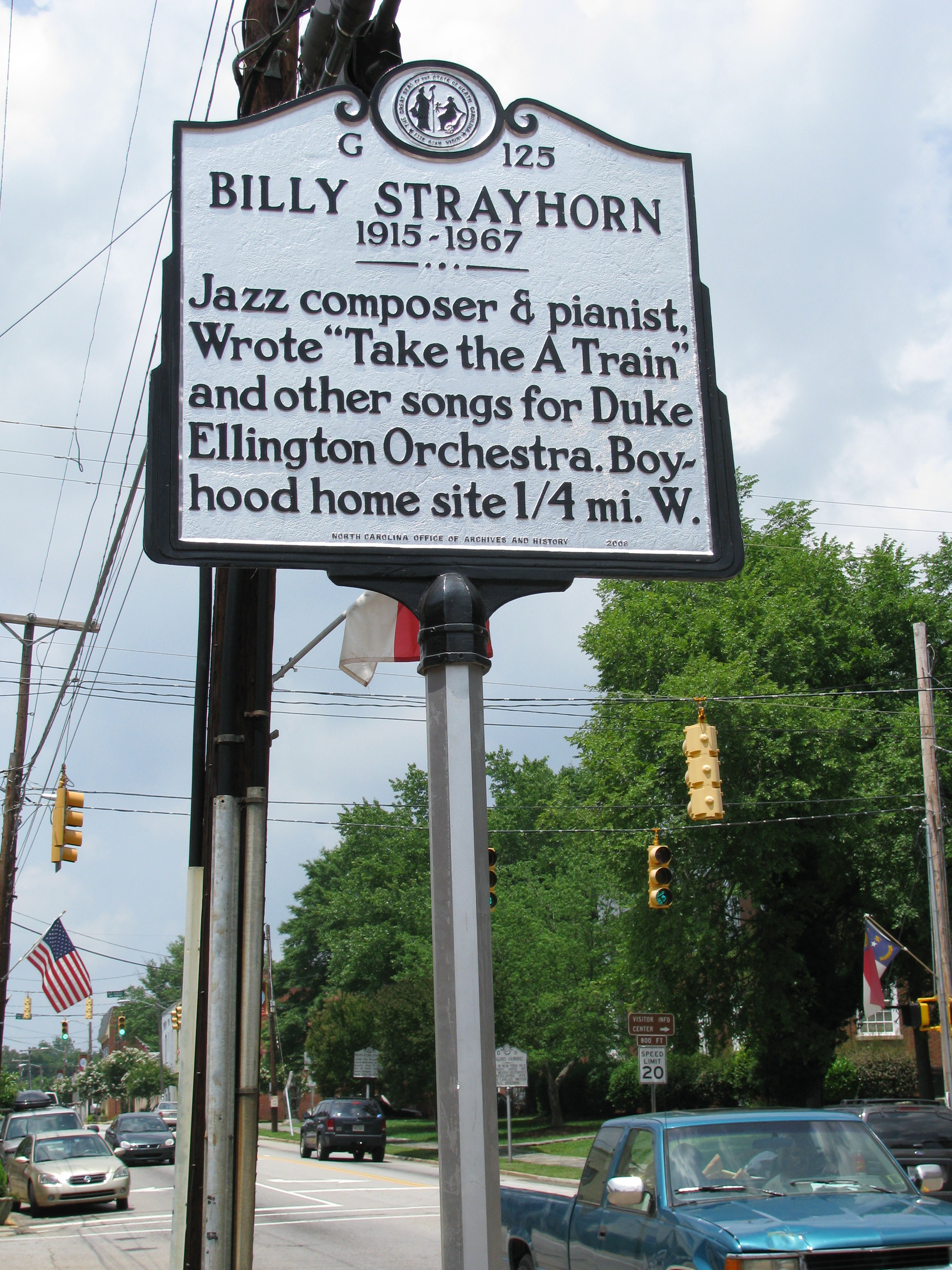
A sign in dedication to Strayhorn near his childhood home in Hillsborough, North Carolina (2009)

A Pennsylvania state historical marker highlighting Strayhorn's accomplishments was placed at Westinghouse High School in Pittsburgh, from which he graduated. In North Carolina, a highway historical marker honoring Strayhorn is located in downtown Hillsborough, near his childhood home. Strayhorn is also memorialized in a mural in downtown Hillsborough.

The former Regent Theatre in Pittsburgh's East Liberty neighborhood was renamed the Kelly Strayhorn Theater in honor of Strayhorn and fellow Pittsburgh resident Gene Kelly in 2000. It is a community-based performing arts theater.

In 2015, Strayhorn was inducted into the Legacy Walk, on North Halsted Street in Chicago, Illinois.

In his autobiography and in a spoken-word passage in his Second Sacred Concert, Ellington listed what he considered Strayhorn's "four major moral freedoms": "freedom from hate, unconditionally; freedom from self-pity (even through all the pain and bad news); freedom from fear of possibly doing something that might possibly help another more than it might himself and freedom from the kind of pride that might make a man think that he was better than his brother or his neighbor."

Jazz pianist Fred Hersch wrote of Strayhorn, "He was a quadruple threat: a great composer of jazz tunes, a first-rate jazz pianist, a remarkable songwriter (music and lyrics), and one of the all-time great arrangers for jazz orchestra."

== Discography ==
For albums where Strayhorn arranged or performed with the Duke Ellington Orchestra, see Duke Ellington discography.

=== As leader/co-leader ===
- 1950–51: Great Times! with Duke Ellington (Mercer, 1964)
- 1958: !!!Live!!! (Roulette, 1958)
- 1959: Cue for Saxophone (Felsted, 1959)
- 1961: The Peaceful Side (United Artists, 1963)
- 1964–65: Lush Life (Red Baron, 1992)

=== As arranger ===
- 1961: Johnny Hodges with Billy Strayhorn and the Orchestra (Verve, 1962)

=== Compilation ===
- Day Dream: Complete 1945–1961 Sessions as a Leader (Essential Jazz Classics, 2015)[2-CD]

=== As sideman ===
With Johnny Hodges

- Castle Rock (Norgran, 1955) – recorded in 1951
- Creamy (Norgran, 1955)
- Ellingtonia '56 (Norgran, 1956)
- Duke's in Bed (Verve, 1956)
- The Big Sound (Verve, 1957)
- Blues A-Plenty (Verve, 1958)
- Not So Dukish (Verve, 1958)

With Joya Sherrill

- Joya Sherrill Sings Duke (20th Century Fox, 1965)

With Ben Webster

- Music for Loving (Norgran, 1954)

=== Strayhorn songbooks ===
- Lush Life: The Billy Strayhorn Songbook (Verve, 1996) – featuring a collection of recordings by Sarah Vaughan, Art Farmer, Oscar Peterson, Dizzy Gillespie, Cecil Taylor, Stan Getz, and others
- Billy Strayhorn: Lush Life (Blue Note, 2007) – featuring newly recorded performances by Dianne Reeves, Joe Lovano, Hank Jones, Bill Charlap, Elvis Costello, and others

== See also ==
- List of jazz musicians
- List of jazz standards
- LGBTQ representation in jazz
