= Eddie Chamblee =

American jazz and R&B saxophonist and vocalist (1920–1999)

- Born: Edwin Leon Chamblee; February 24, 1920; Atlanta, Georgia, U.S.
- Died: May 1, 1999 (aged 79) New York City, U.S.
- Genres: Jazz, rhythm and blues
- Occupation: Musician
- Instruments: Tenor saxophone, alto saxophone
- Years active: 1940s – 1990s
- Labels: Miracle, Mercury, EmArcy, Roulette, Prestige, Black & Blue

Edwin Leon Chamblee (February 24, 1920 – May 1, 1999), known as Eddie "Long Gone" Chamblee, was an American tenor and alto saxophonist, and occasional vocalist, who played jazz and R&B.

== Life and career ==
He was born in Atlanta, Georgia, United States, and grew up in Chicago, Illinois, where he began learning the saxophone at the age of 12. After leaving Wendell Phillips High School, he studied law at Chicago State University, playing in clubs in the evenings and at weekends. He played in US Army bands between 1941 and 1946. After leaving the army, he joined Miracle Records. He played on Sonny Thompson's hit record "Long Gone" in 1948, and on its follow-up, "Late Freight", credited to the Sonny Thompson Quintet featuring Eddie Chamblee. Both records reached no. 1 on the national Billboard R&B chart. Two follow-up records, "Blue Dreams" and "Back Street", also made the R&B chart in 1949.

From 1947, he led his own band in Chicago clubs, as well as continuing to record with Thompson and on other sessions in Chicago, including The Four Blazes' no. 1 R&B hit "Mary Jo" in 1952. In 1955 he joined Lionel Hampton's band for two years, touring in Europe, before returning to lead his own group in Chicago. He accompanied both Amos Milburn and Lowell Fulson on some of their recordings, and then worked as accompanist to Dinah Washington on many of her successful recordings in the late 1950s and early 1960s. The two performed vocal duets in a style similar to that later adopted by Washington with Brook Benton, and were briefly married; he was her fifth husband. Chamblee also recorded for the Mercury and EmArcy labels, and with his own group in the early 1960s for the Roulette and Prestige labels.

In the 1970s, he rejoined Hampton for tours of Europe, where he also played with Milt Buckner, and he recorded for the French Black & Blue label. He also performed with the Count Basie Orchestra in 1982, and from the 1980s until his death with the Harlem Blues and Jazz Band, as well as in clubs in New York City.

He died in New York in 1999, at the age of 79 from natural causes.

== Discography ==
- Chamblee Music (EmArcy, 1957)
- Doodlin' (EmArcy, 1958)
- The Rocking Tenor Sax of Eddie Chamblee (Prestige, 1964)
- Twenty Years After (Black & Blue, 1976)

With Lionel Hampton

- Lionel Hampton Big Band (Clef, 1955)

With Dodo Greene

- My Hour of Need (Blue Note, 1962 [1996])

With Memphis Slim

- Legend of the Blues Vol. 1 (Jubilee, 1967)
- The Legacy of the Blues Vol. 7 (Sonet, 1973)

With T-Bone Walker

- T-Bone Blues (Atlantic, 1955)

With Dinah Washington

- After Hours with Miss "D" (EmArcy, 1954)
- Dinah Washington Sings Fats Waller (EmArcy, 1957)
- Dinah Washington - The Queen! (Mercury, 1957)
- Dinah Sings Bessie Smith (EmArcy, 1957)
- Back to the Blues (Roulette, 1962)
