= Tab Smith =

American saxophonist (1909–1971)

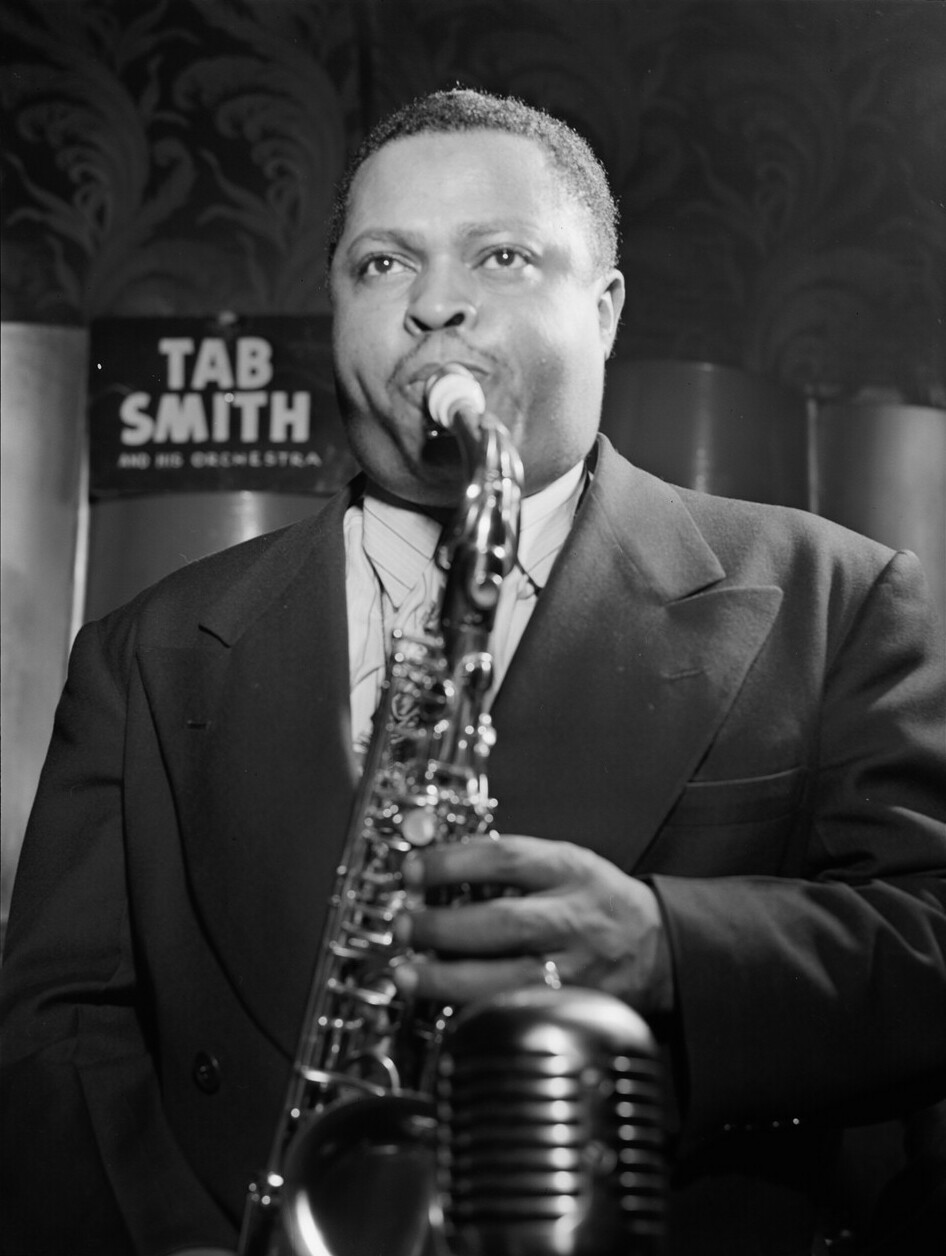
- Tab Smith in New York between 1946 and 1948

Background information
- Born: Talmadge Smith; January 11, 1909; Kinston, North Carolina, U.S.
- Died: August 19, 1971 (aged 62) St. Louis, Missouri, U.S.
- Genres: Swing, rhythm and blues
- Occupation: Musician
- Instrument: Alto saxophone
- Years active: 1929–early 1960s

Talmadge "Tab" Smith (January 11, 1909 – August 17, 1971) was an American swing and rhythm and blues alto saxophonist. He is best remembered for the tracks "Because of You" and "Pretend". He worked with Count Basie, the Mills Rhythm Boys and Lucky Millinder.

== Biography ==
Smith was born in Kinston, North Carolina, United States. He joined his first professional band, the Carolina Stompers, in 1929. In the 1930s and 1940s, he spent several years in the bands of Lucky Millinder and Count Basie, as well as spending long periods freelancing both as a player and as an arranger. In 1944, he participated in a recording date led by Coleman Hawkins, for which he also arranged the material. After the Second World War, he led his own groups, which concentrated on rhythm and blues material.

His biggest R&B hit was "Because of You" (1940), which reached number 1 on the US Billboard R&B chart, and number 20 on the pop chart, in 1951. "Because of You" was recorded for United Records, a label for which Smith was a prolific artist until it closed in 1957. Tab Smith cut 24 singles and a 10-inch album for the label. On his United sides, Smith sometimes played tenor saxophone.

During the 1950s, Smith was a significant rival to alto saxophone-playing bandleader Earl Bostic, who recorded for King. He was also in competition with his own formative influence, Johnny Hodges, until Hodges returned to the Duke Ellington band in 1955.

His career never recovered from the closure of United Records. After brief stays at Checker and King, Smith retired from the music business in the early 1960s. He sold real estate and played piano part-time in a steakhouse.

He died in St. Louis, Missouri, in August 1971, aged 62.
