= Something to Live For (song) =

1939 jazz composition by Billy Strayhorn

"(I Want) Something to Live For"

Single by Duke Ellington and His Famous Orchestra
- A-side: "Portrait of the Lion"
- Released: May 4, 1939
- Recorded: March 21, 1939
- Genre: Jazz
- Length: 2:51
- Label: Brunswick
- Songwriters: Duke Ellington, Billy Strayhorn

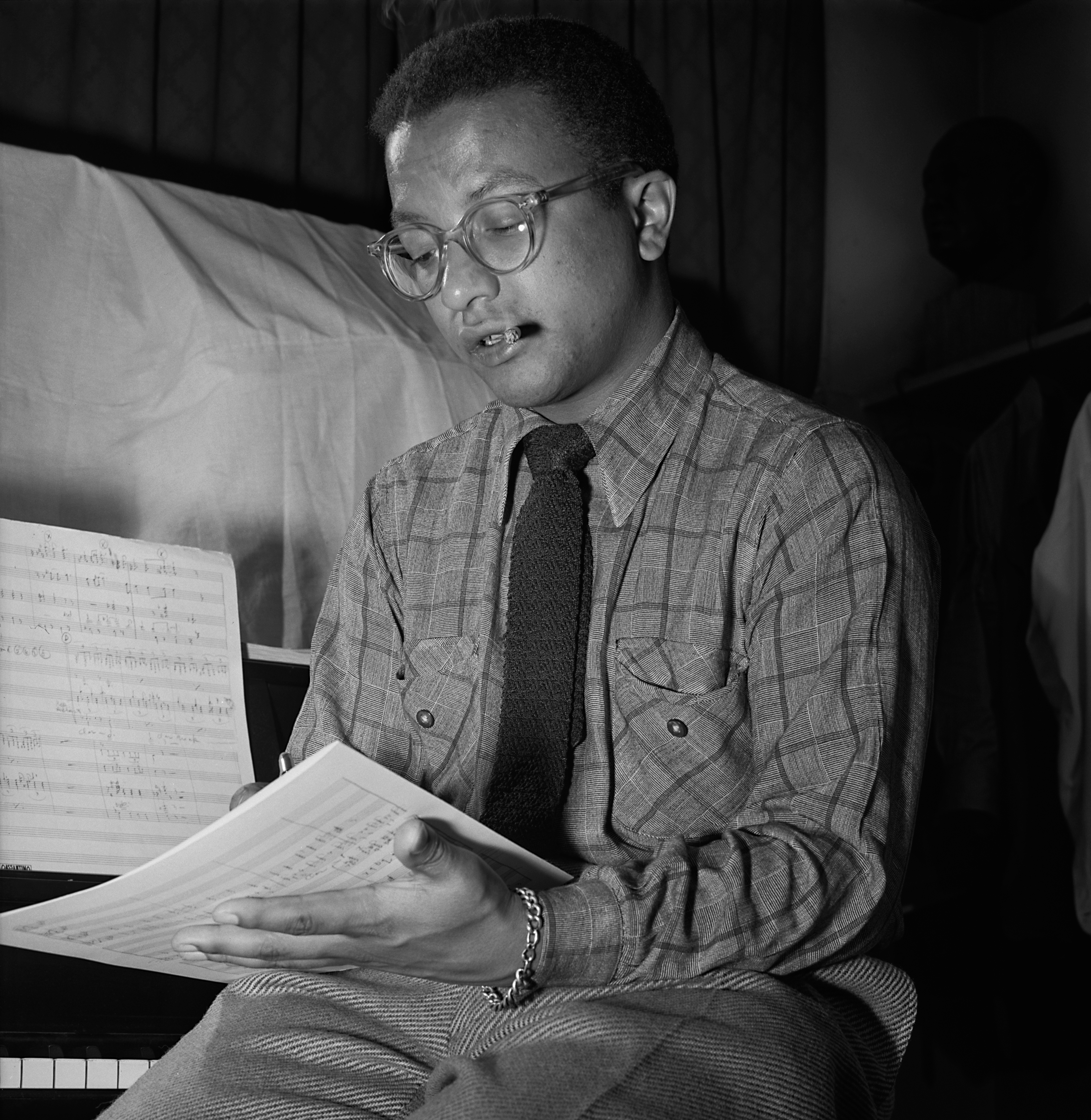
Billy Strayhorn

"Something to Live For" is a 1939 jazz composition by Billy Strayhorn. It was the first collaboration between Strayhorn and Duke Ellington and became the first of many Strayhorn compositions to be recorded by Ellington's orchestra. The song was based on a poem Strayhorn had written as a teenager. According to an all-day tribute to Strayhorn on KCSM radio on 29 November 2008—Strayhorn's birthday—Strayhorn began working on this tune in 1933 when he was 18.

The song has been recorded many times, by Ellington, Lena Horne, Ella Fitzgerald, Nina Simone, Carmen McRae, Tony Bennett, Johnny Mathis, Mel Torme and many others. Fitzgerald has called it her favorite song.

== See also ==
- List of 1930s jazz standards
