= David Hajdu =

American journalist, author and academic (born 1955)

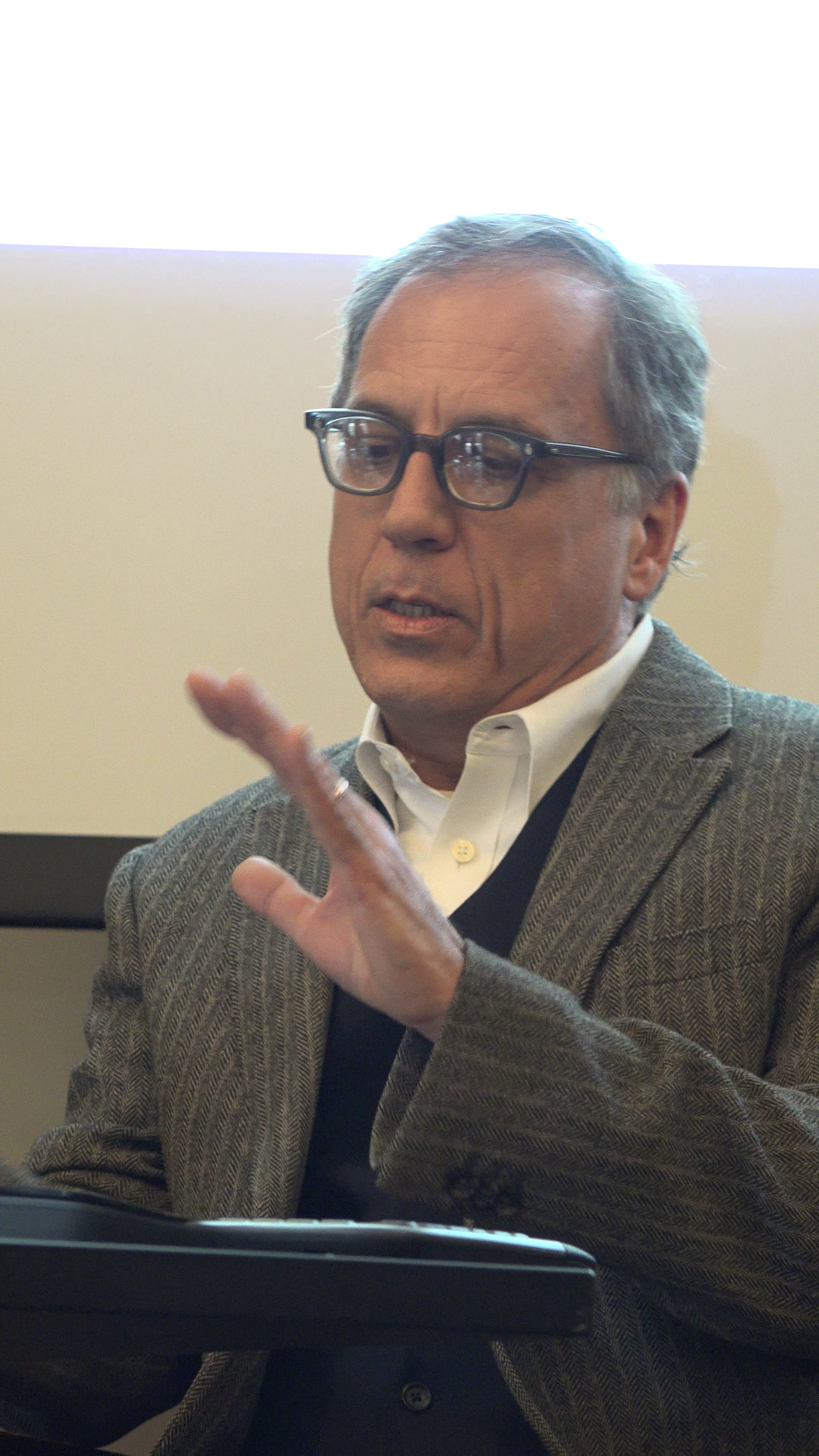
- Hajdu in 2015
- Born: March 1955 (age 71); Phillipsburg, New Jersey, US
- Occupations: Professor, music critic, writer
- Spouse: Karen Oberlin
- Children: 3
- Writing career
- Period: 1972–present
- Notable works: Lush Life; Positively 4th Street; The Ten-Cent Plague; Love for Sale
- Website: www.davidhajdu.com

David Hajdu (/ˈheɪdjuː/; born March 1955) is an American columnist, author and professor at Columbia University Graduate School of Journalism. He was the music critic for The New Republic for 12 years and is music editor at The Nation.

== Biography ==
Hajdu is of Hungarian and Italian descent, and was born and raised in Phillipsburg, New Jersey, he attended New York University, where he majored in journalism.

His first professional work was illustrating for The Easton Express in 1972. He started writing for The Village Voice and Rolling Stone in 1979, and was the founding editor of Video Review magazine, where he worked from 1980 to 1984. In the late 1980s he began teaching at The New School, and was an editor at Entertainment Weekly from 1990 to 1999. He was the music critic for The New Republic for 12 years and is music editor at The Nation.

He has taught at the University of Chicago (as nonfiction writer in residence), Syracuse University, and Columbia University, where he is a professor of journalism.

He has written biographies and other nonfiction about the musicians Billy Strayhorn, Joan Baez, Bob Dylan, Mimi Baez Farina, and Richard Farina. He has also written about comic books.

In October, 2021, President Joe Biden nominated Hajdu to serve a six-year term on the National Endowment for the Humanities.

== Awards ==
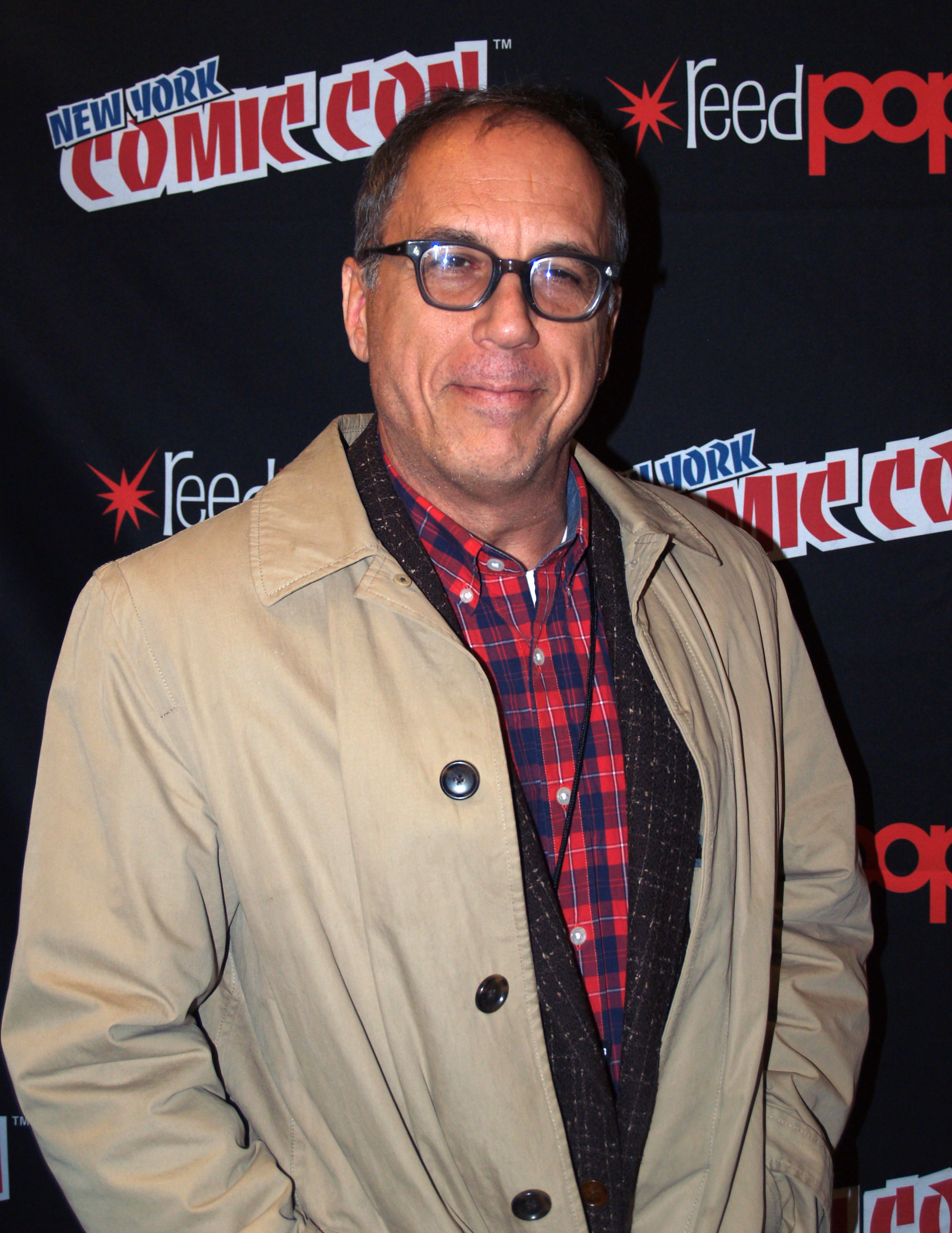
Hajdu in October 2014

- 1997 ASCAP-Deems Taylor Award: Lush Life: A Biography of Billy Strayhorn
- 2002:
  - ASCAP-Deems Taylor Award: Positively 4th Street: The Lives and Times of Joan Baez, Bob Dylan, Mimi Baez Farina and Richard Farina
  - Finalist, National Book Critics Circle Award: Positively 4th Street: The Lives and Times of Joan Baez, Bob Dylan, Mimi Baez Farina and Richard Farina
  - Finalist, Firecracker Alternative Book Award: Positively 4th Street: The Lives and Times of Joan Baez, Bob Dylan, Mimi Baez Farina and Richard Farina
- 2010 ASCAP-Deems Taylor Award: Heroes and Villains: Essays on Music, Movies, Comics, and Culture

== Bibliography ==
All books written by David Hajdu, and published by Farrar, Straus and Giroux, New York, unless otherwise noted.

- The Uncanny Muse: Music, Art, and Machines from Automata to AI. W. W. Norton & Company. 2025. ISBN 978-0393540833.
- Adrianne Geffel: A Fiction. W. W. Norton & Company. 2020. ISBN 9780393634228.
- Love for Sale: Pop Music in America. 2016. ISBN 978-0374170530.
- Heroes and Villains: Essays on Music, Movies, Comics, and Culture. Da Capo Press. 2009. ISBN 978-0306818332.
- The Ten-Cent Plague: The Great Comic-Book Scare and How It Changed America. 2008. ISBN 978-0374187675.
- Positively 4th Street: The Lives and Times of Joan Baez, Bob Dylan, Mimi Baez Fariña and Richard Fariña. 2001. ISBN 978-0374281991.
- Lush Life: A Biography of Billy Strayhorn. 1996. ISBN 978-0374194383.
