= Memphis Slim =

American blues pianist, singer, and composer (1915–1988)

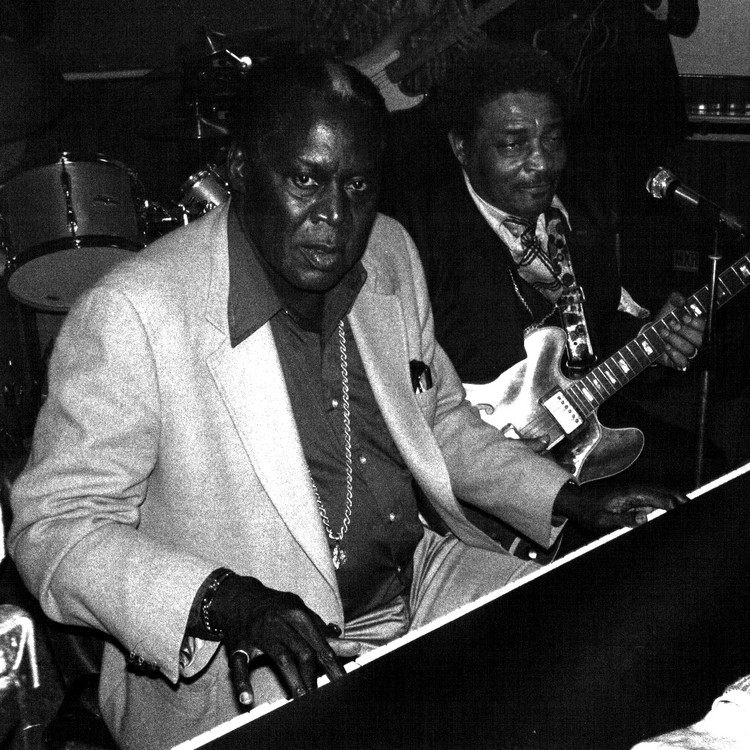
- Memphis Slim in 1980

Background information
- Also known as: Peter Chatman
- Born: John Len Chatman; September 3, 1915; Memphis, Tennessee, U.S.
- Died: February 24, 1988 (aged 72) Paris, France
- Genre: Blues
- Occupations: Musician; songwriter
- Instruments: Piano; vocals
- Years active: 1930s–1980s
- Labels: Bluebird; Hy-Tone; Miracle; Premium; Mercury; United; Vee-Jay; Folkways; Antone's

John Len Chatman (September 3, 1915 – February 24, 1988), known professionally as Memphis Slim, was an American blues pianist, singer, and composer. He led a series of bands that, reflecting the popular appeal of jump blues, included saxophones, bass, drums, and piano. A song he first cut in 1947, "Every Day I Have the Blues", has become a blues standard, recorded by many other artists. He made over 500 recordings.

He was posthumously inducted into the Blues Hall of Fame in 1989.

== Biography ==
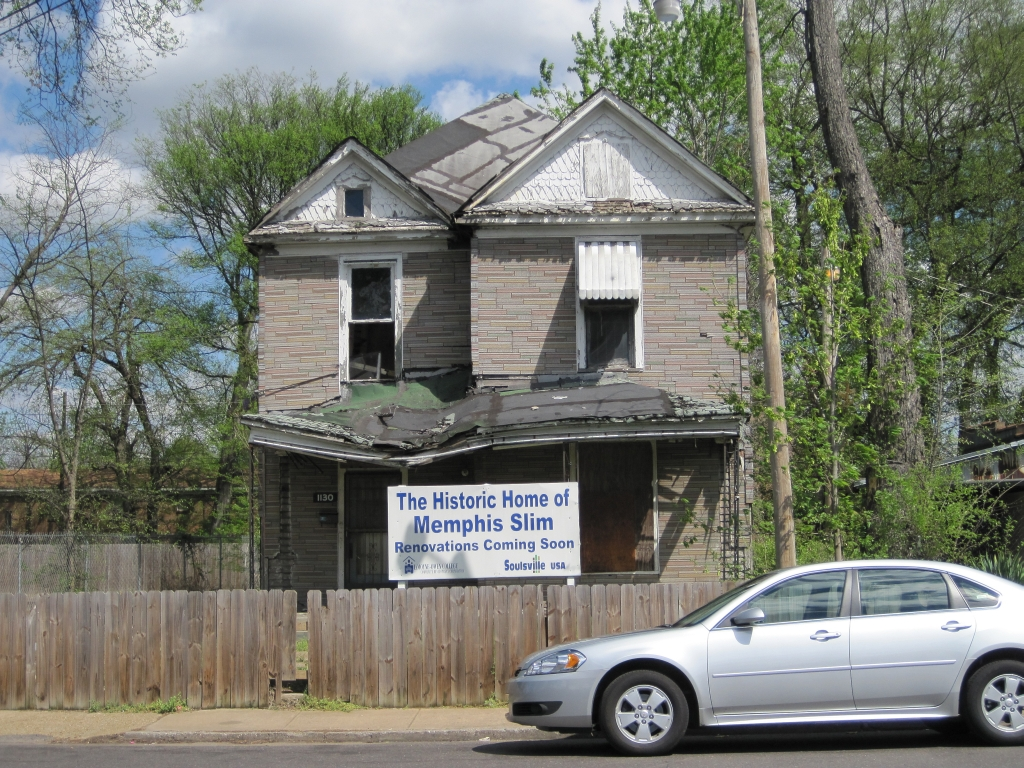
Memphis Slim historic home in Memphis, at 1130 College Street - now restored and housing the Memphis Slim Collaboratory

Memphis Slim was born John Len Chatman, in Memphis, Tennessee. For his first recordings, for Okeh Records in 1940, he used the name of his father, Peter Chatman (who sang, played piano and guitar, and operated juke joints); it is commonly believed that he did so to honor his father. He started performing under the name "Memphis Slim" later that year but continued to publish songs under the name Peter Chatman.

He spent most of the 1930s performing in honky-tonks, dance halls, and gambling joints in West Memphis, Arkansas, and southeast Missouri. He settled in Chicago in 1939 and began teaming with the guitarist and singer Big Bill Broonzy in clubs soon afterwards. In 1940 and 1941, he recorded two songs for Bluebird Records that became part of his repertoire for decades, "Beer Drinking Woman" and "Grinder Man Blues". These were released under the name "Memphis Slim," given to him by Bluebird's producer, Lester Melrose. Slim became a regular session musician for Bluebird, and his piano talents supported established stars such as John Lee "Sonny Boy" Williamson, Washboard Sam, and Jazz Gillum. Many of Slim's recordings and performances until the mid-1940s were with Broonzy, who had recruited Slim to be his piano player after the death of his accompanist Joshua Altheimer in 1940.

After World War II, Slim began leading bands that generally included saxophones, bass, drums, and piano, reflecting the popular appeal of jump blues. With the decline of blues recording by the major labels, Slim worked with emerging independent labels. Starting in late 1945, he recorded with trios for the small Chicago-based Hy-Tone Records. With a lineup of alto saxophone, tenor sax, piano, and string bass (Willie Dixon played the instrument on the first session), he signed with the Miracle label in the fall of 1946. One of the songs recorded at the first session was the ebullient boogie "Rockin' the House," from which his band would take its name. Slim and the House Rockers recorded mainly for Miracle through 1949, with some commercial success. Among the songs they recorded were "Messin' Around" (which reached number one on the R&B charts in 1948) and "Harlem Bound". In 1947, the day after producing a concert by Slim, Broonzy, and Williamson at New York City's Town Hall, the folklorist Alan Lomax brought the three musicians to the Decca Records studios and recorded with Slim on vocal and piano. Lomax presented sections of this recording on BBC Radio in the early 1950s as a documentary, The Art of the Negro, and later released an expanded version as the LP Blues in the Mississippi Night. In 1949, Slim expanded his combo to a quintet by adding a drummer; the group was now spending most of its time on tour, leading to off-contract recording sessions for King Records in Cincinnati and Peacock Records in Houston.

One of Slim's 1947 recordings for Miracle, released in 1949, was originally titled "Nobody Loves Me". It has become famous as "Every Day I Have the Blues." The song was recorded in 1950 by Lowell Fulson and subsequently by numerous other artists, including B. B. King, Elmore James, T-Bone Walker, Ray Charles, Eric Clapton, Natalie Cole, Ella Fitzgerald, Jimi Hendrix, Mahalia Jackson, Sarah Vaughan, Carlos Santana, John Mayer and Lou Rawls. Joe Williams recorded it in 1952 for Checker Records; his remake from 1956 (included on the album Count Basie Swings, Joe Williams Sings) was inducted into the Grammy Hall of Fame in 1992.

Early in 1950, Miracle succumbed to financial troubles, but its owners regrouped to form the Premium label, and Slim remained on board until the successor company faltered in the summer of 1951. His February 1951 session for Premium saw two changes in the House Rockers' lineup: Slim started using two tenor saxophones instead of the alto and tenor combination, and he made a trial of adding the guitarist Ike Perkins. His last session for Premium kept the two-tenor lineup but dispensed with the guitar. During his time with Premium, Slim first recorded his song "Mother Earth".

Slim made just one session for King, but the company bought his Hy-Tone sides in 1948 and acquired his Miracle masters after that company failed in 1950. He was never a Chess artist, but Leonard Chess bought most of the Premium masters after the demise of Premium.

After a year with Mercury Records, Slim signed with United Records in Chicago; the A&R man, Lew Simpkins, knew him from Miracle and Premium. The timing was propitious, because he had just added the guitarist Matt "Guitar" Murphy to his group. He remained with United through the end of 1954, when the company began to cut back on blues recording.

After 1954, Slim did not have a steady relationship with a record company until 1958, when he signed with Vee-Jay Records. In 1959 his band, still featuring Murphy, recorded the album Memphis Slim at the Gate of the Horn, which featured a lineup of his best-known songs, including "Mother Earth", "Gotta Find My Baby", "Rockin' the Blues", "Steppin' Out", and "Slim's Blues". In December 1959, Willie Dixon's debut album, Willie's Blues, was released. Memphis Slim was given almost equal credit on the album as Dixon's piano accompanist. Memphis Slim played on all of the tracks, and wrote the two numbers that were not penned by Dixon.

Slim first appeared outside the United States in 1960, touring with Willie Dixon, with whom he returned to Europe in 1962 as a featured artist in the first of the series of American Folk Festival concerts organized by Dixon, which brought many notable blues artists to Europe in the 1960s and 1970s. The duo released several albums together on Folkways Records, including Memphis Slim and Willie Dixon at the Village Gate with Pete Seeger (1962).

In 1962, Slim moved permanently to Paris, and his engaging personality and well-honed presentation of playing, singing, and storytelling about the blues secured his position as one of the most prominent blues artists for nearly three decades. He appeared on television in numerous European countries, acted in several French films and wrote the score for À nous deux France (1970), and performed regularly in Paris, throughout Europe, and on return visits to the United States. In the last years of his life, he teamed up with the respected jazz drummer George Collier. The two toured Europe together and became friends. After Collier died in August 1987, Slim rarely appeared in public, although he reunited with Matt "Guitar" Murphy for a gig at Antone's in Austin, Texas, in 1987.

Two years before his death, Slim was named a Commander in the Ordre des Arts et des Lettres by the Ministry of Culture of the Republic of France. In addition, the U.S. Senate honored Slim with the title of Ambassador-at-Large of Good Will.

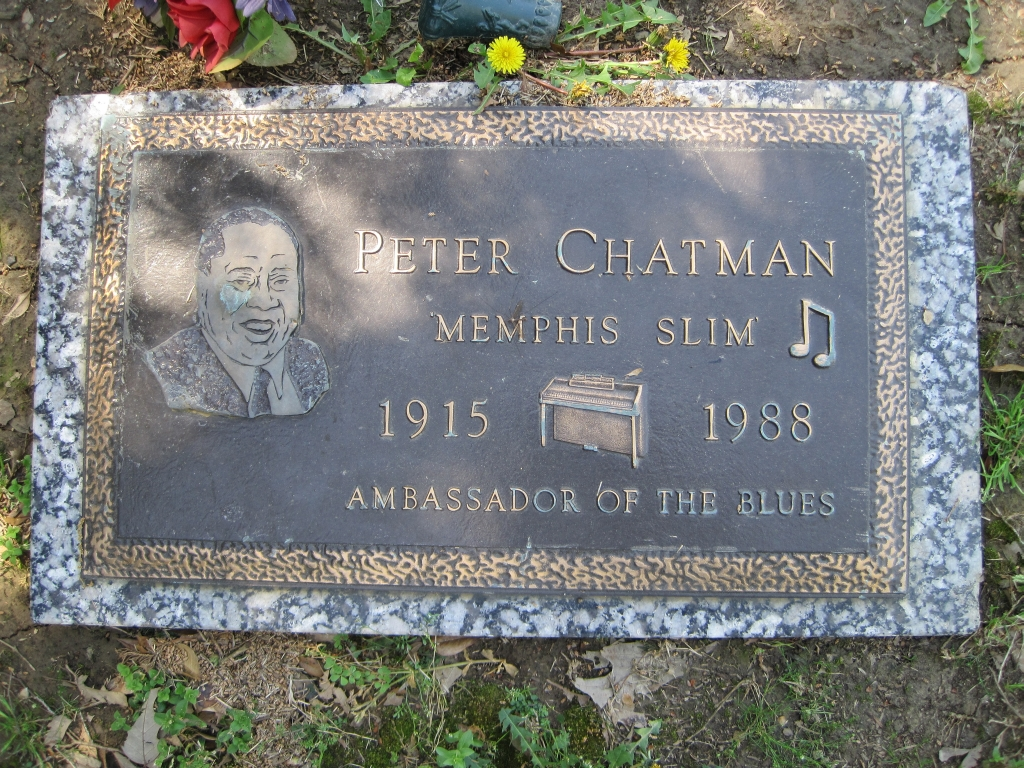
Grave of Memphis Slim

Memphis Slim died of renal failure on February 24, 1988, in Paris, at the age of 72. He is buried at Galilee Memorial Gardens in Memphis, Tennessee.

He was posthumously inducted into the Blues Hall of Fame in 1989. He was inducted into the Memphis Music Hall of Fame in 2015.

=== Charting singles ===
List of charting singles with year, title, label, and chart peak
Year	Title A-side / B-side	Label	Chart peak U.S. R&B
1948	"Messin' Around" / "Midnight Jump"	Miracle 125	1
1949	"Frisco Bay" / "Timsy's Whimsy"	Miracle 132	11
1949	"Blue and Lonesome" /	Miracle 136	2
1949	"Help Me Some"	Miracle 136	9
1949	"Angel Child" / "Nobody Loves Me"	Miracle 145	6
1951	"Mother Earth" / "Really Got the Blues"	Premium 867	7
1953	"The Come Back" / "Five O'Clock Blues"	United 156	3

=== Albums ===
Year	Title	Label
1959	Memphis Slim at the Gate of Horn	Vee-Jay
1959	Memphis Slim and the Real Boogie-Woogie	Folkways
1960	Memphis Slim and the Honky-Tonk Sound	Folkways
1960	Travelling with the Blues	Storyville
1960	Blue This Evening	Black Lion
1960	Pete Seeger at the Village Gate with Memphis Slim and Willie Dixon, Vol. 1	Folkways
1960	Songs of Memphis Slim and "Wee Willie" Dixon	Folkways
1961	Tribute to Big Bill Broonzy	Candid
1961	Steady Rollin' Blues: The Blues of Memphis Slim	Bluesville/OBC
1961	Memphis Slim U.S.A.	Candid
1961	Broken Soul Blues	Beat Goes On/BGO
1961	Chicago Blues: Boogie Woogie and Blues Played and Sung by Memphis Slim	Folkways
1961	Blues by Jazz Gillum Singing and Playing His Harmonica with Arbee Stidham and Memphis Slim	Folkways
1961	Just Blues	Bluesville/OBC
1961	No Strain	Bluesville/OBC
1962	Sonny Boy Williamson and Memphis Slim in Paris	GNP Crescendo
1962	Memphis Slim and Willie Dixon at the Village Gate with Pete Seeger	Folkways
1962	Pete Seeger at the Village Gate with Memphis Slim and Willie Dixon, Vol. 2	Folkways
1962	All Kinds of Blues	Bluesville/OBC
1963	Alone with My Friends	Battle
1963	Jazz in Paris: Aux Trois Mailletz	Polygram
1963	Live in Paris	INA
1964	Clap Your Hands	Maison De Blues
1965	Fattenin' Frogs for Snakes	Melodisc
1967	Legend of the Blues Vol. 1	Jubilee
1967	Bluesingly Yours	Maison De Blues
1968	Lord Have Mercy on Me	Maison De Blues
1969	The Bluesman (released 1975)	Maison De Blues
1969	Mother Earth	One Way (originally issued on Buddah Records)
1970	The Blue Memphis Suite	Maison de Blues
1970	Messin' Around with the Blues	King
1971	Boogie Woogie	Maison de Blues
1971	Born with the Blues	Fuel 2000
1971	Blue Memphis	Wounded Bird (originally issued on Warner Bros.)
1972	South Side Reunion (with Buddy Guy and Junior Wells)	Sunny Side (originally issued on Warner Bros.)
1972	Old Times, New Times (with Roosevelt Sykes, Buddy Guy and Junior Wells)	Barclay
1973	The Legacy of the Blues Vol. 7	Sonet
1973	Memphis Slim	Storyville
1973	Soul Blues	Acrobat
1973	Raining the Blues	Fantasy
1973	Favorite Blues Singers	Folkways
1973	Very Much Alive and in Montreux	Universal International
1973	Memphis Heat (with Canned Heat) (released 1974)	Blue Star
1975	Going Back to Tennessee	Maison de Blues
1981	Rockin' the Blues	Charly
1981	I'll Just Keep on Singin' the Blues	Muse
1982	Can A White Man Play and Sing the Blues ?	Milan
1982	Fip Fil and Fim	Milan
1990	Steppin' Out: Live at Ronnie Scotts	Castle Music UK
1990	Together Again One More Time (with Matt Guitar Murphy) (2-CD set including Still Not Ready for Eddie by Eddie Taylor)	Antone's/Texas Music Group
1990	Parisian Blues	Polygram
1990	The Real Folk Blues	Chess/MCA
1992	Blues Masters, Vol 9: Memphis Slim	Storyville
1992	Pinetop's Boogie Woogie	Antone's
1993	London Sessions 1960	Sequel UK
1994	The Blues Collection, Vol. 13: Beer Drinkin' Woman	
1994	Lonesome	Legacy International
1994	Live at the Hot Club	BMG International
1995	Boogie After Midnight	Chicago Music
1995	Jazz & Blues Collection	Edition Atlas
1996	The Complete Recordings, Vol. 1: 1940–1941 (Peter Chatman as Memphis Slim)	EPM Musique
1996	Come Back & Other Classics	Masters Intercontinental
1996	The Bluebird Recordings, 1940–1941	RCA
1997	Dialogue in Boogie (with Philippe Lejeune)	Happy Bird
1998	Lonely Nights	Catfish
1998	Very Best of Memphis Slim: The Blues Is Everywhere	Collectables
1999	Life Is Like That	Charly UK
1999	Memphis Slim at the Gate of the Horn	Vee Jay/Charly
2000	The Folkways Years, 1959–1973	Smithsonian Folkways
2000	Blues at Midnight	Catfish
2000	Live at Antone's, Vol. 1	Antone's
2001	The Complete Recordings, Vol. 2: 1946–1948	EPM Musique
2001	Essential Masters	Cleopatra
2001	Blue and Lonesome	Arpeggio Blues
2001	Ambassador of the Blues	Indigo UK
2002	The Complete Recordings, Vol. 3: 1948–1950	EPM Musique
2002	I Am the Blues	Prestige Elite
2002	Kansas City	Classic World
2002	Boogie for My Friends	Black & Blue [France]
2002	The Come Back	United/Delmark
2002	Blues Legends: Memphis Slim	Lead
2003	Three Women Blues	Time Wind [Germany]
2003	The Complete Recordings, Vol 4: 1951–1952	EPM Musique
2004	Worried Life Blues	Quadromania Klassik [Germany]
2004	Grinder Man Blues	Snapper UK
2004	The Best of Memphis Slim	Liquid 8
2005	Boogie for Two Pianos, Vol. 1 (with Jean-Paul Amouroux)	
2005	Paris Mississippi Blues	Sunny Side
2005	Double-Barreled Boogie (with Roosevelt Sykes)	Sunny Side
2006	Forty Years of More	Passport Audio
2006	Memphis Suite	Sunny Side
2006	Rockin' This House: Chicago Blues Piano 1946–1953	JSP Records
2006	The Sonet Blues Story	Verve
2006	An Introduction to Memphis Slim	Fuel 2000
2007	The Ultimate Jazz Archive 14 (1940–41)	Carinco AG
2007	Sings the Blues	Wnts
2007	Chicago Blues Masters, Vol. 1 (with Muddy Waters)	Capitol
2007	Cold Blooded Woman	Collectables
2008	Greatest Moments	Stardust
2008	Four Walls	Jukebox Entertainment
2008	Born to Boogie	Unlimited Media

== Bibliography ==
- Herzhaft, Gerard (1992). "Memphis Slim". Encyclopedia of the Blues. Fayetteville, Arkansas: University of Arkansas Press. ISBN 1-55728-252-8.
- Palmer, Robert (1982). Deep Blues. New York City: Penguin Books. ISBN 0-14006-223-8.
- Whitburn, Joel (1988). "Memphis Slim". Top R&B Singles 1942–1988. Menomonee Falls, Wisconsin: Record Research. ISBN 0-89820-068-7.
