= The Blanton–Webster Band =

1990 compilation album by Duke Ellington

Compilation album by Duke Ellington
- Released: 1986 LP
- Recorded: 1940–1942
- Genre: Jazz; Swing; Big band music
- Length: 204:07
- Label: Bluebird (RCA/BMG)
- Producer: Steve Becker, Bob Porter

Professional ratings
Review scores
Source	Rating
AllMusic	link
The Rolling Stone Jazz & Blues Album Guide	5/5 stars
The Encyclopedia of Popular Music	5/5 stars
Penguin Guide to Jazz	👑

The Blanton–Webster Band is a compilation album that combines the master takes of all the recordings by Duke Ellington's Orchestra during the years of 1940 to 1942, involving bassist Jimmy Blanton and tenor saxophonist Ben Webster. The recordings were originally made for RCA Victor during what many critics regard as the Ellington orchestra's golden period. The three CDs contain many numbers which were to become classics, and the arrangements (by Ellington and Billy Strayhorn) were frequently inventive and innovative.

It was voted number 283 in the third edition of Colin Larkin's All Time Top 1000 Albums (2000).

The collection does not include alternate takes or the duets Ellington performed with Jimmy Blanton, available elsewhere. With 66 tracks, the selection includes many of Ellington's hits and classic songs. Rolling Stone praises the collection as "a masterwork of composition and leadership" and "a series of individual triumphs from the greatest team of jazz players ... ever assembled". AllMusic describes it as "essential for all jazz collections".

Bassist Blanton was only with the Ellington orchestra for two years, retiring in 1941 due to tuberculosis, and dying the following year at the age of 23. Despite this compilation's title, Blanton does not appear on the final 17 tracks of the collection, having been replaced on bass by Alvin "Junior" Raglin.

This reissue first surfaced as a four-LP set in 1986. The collection was re-organized, rereleased, and remastered with additional tracks in 2003 as Never No Lament: The Blanton–Webster Band.

== Track list ==
Unless otherwise noted, all tracks by Duke Ellington.

=== Disc one ===
1. "You, You Darlin'" (M.K. Jerome, Jack Scholl) – 3:19
2. "Jack the Bear" – 3:15
3. "Ko Ko" – 2:39
4. "Morning Glory" (Ellington, Rex Stewart) – 3:15
5. "So Far, So Good" (Jack Lawrence, Jimmy Mundy, E.G. White) – 2:50
6. "Conga Brava" (Ellington, Juan Tizol) – 2:54
7. "Concerto for Cootie" – 3:19
8. "Me and You" – 2:54
9. "Cotton Tail" – 3:08
10. "Never No Lament (Don't Get Around Much Anymore)" (Ellington, Bob Russell) – 3:15
11. "Dusk" – 3:19
12. "Bojangles" – 2:50
13. "A Portrait of Bert Williams" – 3:09
14. "Blue Goose" – 3:21
15. "Harlem Air Shaft" – 2:57
16. "At a Dixie Roadside Diner" – (Joe Burke, Edgar Leslie) – 2:45
17. "All Too Soon" (Ellington, Carl Sigman) – 3:28
18. "Rumpus in Richmond" – 2:46
19. "My Greatest Mistake" (Jack Fulton), Jack O'Brien) – 3:27
20. "Sepia Panorama" – 3:20
21. "There Shall Be No Night" (Gladys Shelley, Abner Silver) – 3:05
22. "In a Mellow Tone" (Ellington, Milt Gabler) – 3:19

=== Disc two ===
1. "Five O'Clock Whistle" (Kim Gannon, Gene Irwin, Josef Myrow) – 3:18
2. "Warm Valley" – 3:20
3. "The Flaming Sword" – 3:06
4. "Across the Track Blues" – 2:58
5. "Chloe" (Gus Kahn, Neil Moret) – 3:24
6. "I Never Felt This Way Before" (Al Dubin, Ellington) – 3:23
7. "The Sidewalks of New York" (James W. Blake, Charles B. Lawlor) – 3:14
8. "Flamingo" (Edmund Anderson, Ted Grouya) – 3:22
9. "The Girl in My Dreams Tries to Look Like You" – 3:19
10. "Take the "A" Train" (Billy Strayhorn) – 2:54
11. "Jumpin' Punkins" – 3:33
12. "John Hardy's Wife" – 3:28
13. "Blue Serge" – 3:20
14. "After All" (Strayhorn) – 3:19
15. "Bakiff" (Tizol) – 3:23
16. "Are You Sticking?" – 3:02
17. "Just A-Sittin' and A-Rockin'" (Ellington, Gaines, Strayhorn) – 3:33
18. "The Giddybug Gallop" – 3:29
19. "Chocolate Shake" (Ellington, Paul Francis Webster) – 2:50
20. "I Got It Bad (And That Ain't Good)" (Ellington, Webster) – 3:17
21. "Clementine" (Strayhorn) – 2:53
22. "Brown-Skin Gal (In the Calico Gown)" (Ellington, Webster) – 3:06

=== Disc three ===
1. "Jump for Joy" (Ellington, Sid Kuller, Webster) – 2:50
2. "Moon Over Cuba" (Ellington, Tizol) – 3:09
3. "Five O'Clock Drag" – 2:49
4. "Rocks in My Bed" – 3:06
5. "Bli Blip" (Ellington, Kuller) – 3:03
6. "Chelsea Bridge" (Strayhorn) – 2:52
7. "Rain Check" (Strayhorn) – 2:28
8. "What Good Would It Do?" (Harry James, Buddy Pepper) – 2:44
9. "I Don't Know What Kind of Blues I Got" – 3:13
10. "Perdido" (Ervin Drake, H.J. Lengsfelder, Tizol) – 3:08
11. "C Jam Blues" (Barney Bigard, Ellington) – 2:37
12. "Moon Mist" – 2:58
13. "What Am I Here For?" (Ellington, Frankie Laine) – 3:28
14. "I Don't Mind" (Ellington, Strayhorn) – 2:49
15. "Someone" – 3:09
16. "My Little Brown Book" (Strayhorn) – 3:13
17. "Main Stem" – 2:47
18. "Johnny Come Lately" (Strayhorn) – 2:39
19. "Hayfoot, Strawfoot" (Drake, Lengsfelder, Paul McGrane) – 2:30
20. "Sentimental Lady" – 2:58
21. "A Slip of the Lip (Can Sink a Ship)" (Ellington, Henderson) – 2:54
22. "Sherman Shuffle" – 2:38

== Personnel ==
=== Performance ===
- Duke Ellington – arrangements, conductor, piano (alternating with)
- Billy Strayhorn – arrangements, piano
- Ivie Anderson – vocals
- Herb Jeffries – vocals

reed section

- Barney Bigard – clarinet, tenor saxophone
- Johnny Hodges – alto sax, soprano sax, clarinet
- Ben Webster – tenor saxophone
- Otto Hardwick – alto saxophone
- Chauncey Haughton – clarinet, tenor sax
- Harry Carney – baritone saxophone, clarinet, alto saxophone

brass section

- Rex Stewart – cornet
- Cootie Williams – trumpet
- Ray Nance – trumpet, violin, vocals
- Wallace Jones – trumpet
- Juan Tizol – valve trombone
- Joe Nanton – trombone
- Lawrence Brown – trombone

rhythm section

- Fred Guy – guitar
- Jimmy Blanton – bass
- Alvin "Junior" Raglin – bass
- Sonny Greer – drums

=== Production ===
- Bob Porter – reissue producer
- Ed Begley – remastering
- Steve Backer – executive producer
- Mary Tucker – liner notes
