= Ellington Uptown =

1953 album by Duke Ellington

Studio album by Duke Ellington
- Released: March 1953
- Recorded: December 7 & 11, 1951, February 29, June 30 & July 1, 1952; Bonus tracks December 24, 1947
- Genre: Jazz
- Length: 43:40
- Label: Columbia

Duke Ellington chronology
Masterpieces by Ellington (1951)	Ellington Uptown (1953)	Premiered by Ellington (1953)

Alternative Cover

Ellington Uptown (also released as Hi-Fi Ellington Uptown) is an album by American pianist, composer and bandleader Duke Ellington, recorded for the Columbia label in 1951 and 1952. The album was re-released on CD in 2004 with additional tracks recorded in 1947 and originally released as the Liberian Suite EP.

== Reception ==
The AllMusic review by Scott Yanow stated: "Although some historians have characterized the early '50s as Duke Ellington's 'off period' (due to the defection of alto star Johnny Hodges), in reality, his 1951–1952 orchestra could hold its own against his best. This set has many classic moments... One of the great Duke Ellington sets."

Tom Hull, writing in his July 2004 "Jazz Consumer Guide" for The Village Voice, commented briefly on the release: "Hodges-less, coming out of his most pretentious composerly period, scratching and kicking to hang on."

The extended piece "A Tone Parallel to Harlem" (also known as "The Harlem Suite" or just "Harlem") has often been singled out as one of Ellington's great achievements. Ellington biographer John Edward Hasse writes, "This kaleidoscopic, marvelously descriptive tour of Harlem ... passes by folks working and shopping, fighting for equal rights, festively parading, mourning at a church funeral, and includes other honest, affirmative glimpses of everyday life. ... Harlem, with its three well-integrated themes, is regarded by a number of observers (including, reportedly, the composer himself) as Ellington's best extended work, and he chose to perform it fairly frequently at concerts. It has been called 'every bit as much a miniature masterpiece as is Rhapsody in Blue'." Jazz critic and historian Ted Gioia notes that the work is among "Ellington's more visionary projects" and is "a masterpiece by almost any measure."

Professional ratings
Review scores
Source	Rating
AllMusic	4.5/5 stars
The Penguin Guide to Jazz Recordings	3.5/4 stars
The Rolling Stone Jazz Record Guide	4/5 stars

== Track listing ==
:All compositions by Duke Ellington except as indicated

1. "Skin Deep" (Louis Bellson) – 6:49
2. "The Mooche" (Ellington, Irving Mills) – 6:36
3. "Take the "A" Train" (Billy Strayhorn) – 8:02
4. "A Tone Parallel to Harlem (Harlem Suite)" – 13:48 Previously released on Ellington Uptown only
5. "Perdido" (Juan Tizol) – 8:25
6. "Controversial Suite Part 1: Before My Time" – 6:09 Previously released on Hi-Fi Ellington Uptown only
7. "Controversial Suite Part 2: Later" – 4:14 Previously released on Hi-Fi Ellington Uptown only
8. "The Liberian Suite: I Like the Sunrise" – 4:28 Bonus track on CD reissue
9. "The Liberian Suite: Dance No. 1" – 4:50 Bonus track on CD reissue
10. "The Liberian Suite: Dance No. 2" – 3:26 Bonus track on CD reissue
11. "The Liberian Suite: Dance No. 3" – 3:45 Bonus track on CD reissue
12. "The Liberian Suite: Dance No. 4" – 3:04 Bonus track on CD reissue
13. "The Liberian Suite: Dance No. 5" – 5:08 Bonus track on CD reissue
- Recorded in New York on December 24, 1947 (tracks 8–13), December 7, 1951 (track 4), December 11, 1951 (tracks 6 & 7), June 30, 1952 (track 3), July 1, 1952 (tracks 2 & 5) and in Fresno, California on February 29, 1952 (track 1)

== Personnel ==
- Duke Ellington, Billy Strayhorn – piano
- Cat Anderson (tracks 1–5), Shorty Baker, Willie Cook (tracks 1–7), Shelton Hemphill (tracks 8–13), Al Killian (tracks 8–13), Clark Terry (tracks 1–7), Francis Williams (tracks 4 & 6–13) – trumpet
- Ray Nance – trumpet, violin
- Lawrence Brown (tracks 8–13), Quentin Jackson (tracks 1–7), Britt Woodman (tracks 1–7) – trombone
- Tyree Glenn (track 8–13) – trombone, vibraphone
- Claude Jones (tracks 8–13), Juan Tizol (tracks 1–7) – valve trombone
- Jimmy Hamilton – clarinet, tenor saxophone
- Willie Smith (tracks 1, 4, 6 & 7), Johnny Hodges (track 3 & 8–7), Hilton Jefferson (tracks 1–3 & 5) – alto saxophone
- Russell Procope – alto saxophone, clarinet
- Paul Gonsalves (tracks 1–7), Al Sears (tracks 8–13) – tenor saxophone
- Harry Carney – baritone saxophone
- Fred Guy – guitar (tracks 8–13)
- Wendell Marshall (tracks 1–7), Oscar Pettiford, Junior Raglin (tracks 8–13) – bass
- Louis Bellson (tracks 1–7), Sonny Greer (tracks 8–13) – drums
- Betty Roché (track 3), Al Hibbler (track 8) – vocal
