= Carnegie Hall (disambiguation) =

Carnegie Hall is a concert venue in New York City, United States.

Carnegie Hall may also refer to:

- Carnegie Hall, a theatre and concert venue in Dunfermline, Scotland, the town of Andrew Carnegie's birth
- Carnegie Hall (Hubert Laws album), 1973
- Carnegie Hall (Frank Zappa album), 2011
- Carnegie Hall (film), 1947 film directed by Edgar G. Ulmer
- Carnegie Museum of Natural History in Pittsburgh, Pennsylvania that has "Carnegie Hall" as part of its complex
- Carnegie Hall, Inc., a regional cultural center in Lewisburg, West Virginia, United States

== See also ==
- Carnegie Hall Concert (disambiguation)
- Live at Carnegie Hall (disambiguation)
- At Carnegie Hall (disambiguation)
