= Liberian Suite =

1948 album by Duke Ellington

Studio album by Duke Ellington
- Released: 1948
- Recorded: December 24, 1947
- Genre: Jazz
- Label: Columbia

Duke Ellington chronology
Ellington Special (1947)	Liberian Suite (1948)	The Carnegie Hall Concerts: December 1947 (1947)

Liberian Suite is an album by American pianist, composer and bandleader Duke Ellington, recorded for the Columbia label in 1947. The album was Ellingon's second 10" LP album and one of his earlier works on the Columbia label. The suite represents one of Ellington's early extended compositions and was commissioned for the Liberian centennial. The Liberian Suite was released on CD as bonus tracks on Ellington Uptown in 2004.

== Reception ==
The AllMusic review awarded the album 3 stars and stated, "Liberian Suite was his first international commission, from the government of the African nation, to celebrate the 100th anniversary of its founding by freed American slaves—it was the first formal manifestation of a process by which Ellington would be a virtual musical ambassador to the world by the end of the next decade. As to the music, it is not Ellington's most sophisticated piece of music, but it is filled with bracing rhythms, juicy parts for the horns and saxes, and one stunning vocal part".

Professional ratings
Review scores
Source	Rating
AllMusic	3/5 stars

Around 1953 Philips brought out Liberian Suite on Minigroove 33 1/3 under number B 07611R

== Track listing ==
All compositions by Duke Ellington.

1. "The Liberian Suite: I Like the Sunrise" – 4:28
2. "The Liberian Suite: Dance No. 1" – 4:50
3. "The Liberian Suite: Dance No. 2" – 3:26
4. "The Liberian Suite: Dance No. 3" – 3:45
5. "The Liberian Suite: Dance No. 4" – 3:04
6. "The Liberian Suite: Dance No. 5" – 5:08

- Recorded at Liederkranz Hall in New York on December 24, 1947

== Personnel ==
- Duke Ellington – piano
- Shorty Baker, Shelton Hemphill, Al Killian, Francis Williams – trumpet
- Ray Nance – trumpet, violin
- Lawrence Brown – trombone
- Tyree Glenn – trombone, vibraphone
- Claude Jones – valve trombone
- Jimmy Hamilton – clarinet, tenor saxophone
- Russell Procope – alto saxophone, clarinet
- Johnny Hodges – alto saxophone
- Al Sears – tenor saxophone
- Harry Carney – baritone saxophone
- Fred Guy – guitar
- Oscar Pettiford, Junior Raglin – bass
- Sonny Greer – drums
- Al Hibbler – vocal (track 1)
