= The Carnegie Hall Concerts =

The Carnegie Hall Concerts is the name of a series of live albums from Duke Ellington:

- The Carnegie Hall Concerts: January 1943
- The Carnegie Hall Concerts: December 1944
- The Carnegie Hall Concerts: January 1946
- The Carnegie Hall Concerts: December 1947
