= The Carnegie Hall Concerts: January 1946 =

1977 live album by Duke Ellington

Live album by Duke Ellington
- Released: 1977
- Recorded: January 4, 1946
- Genre: Jazz
- Length: 88:09
- Label: Prestige

Duke Ellington chronology
The Carnegie Hall Concerts: December 1944 (1944)	The Carnegie Hall Concerts: January 1946 (1977)	The Carnegie Hall Concerts: December 1947 (1947)

The Carnegie Hall Concerts: January 1946 is a live album by American pianist, composer and bandleader Duke Ellington recorded at Carnegie Hall, in New York City in 1946 and released on the Prestige label in 1977.

== Reception ==
The AllMusic review by Scott Yanow awarded the album 3 stars and stated: "The 1946 concert is not as memorable as the others but the many major soloists still make this lesser item an enjoyable listening experience".

Professional ratings
Review scores
Source	Rating
AllMusic	3/5 stars
The Rolling Stone Jazz Record Guide	5/5 stars

== Track listing ==
All compositions by Duke Ellington except as indicated

1. "Caravan" (Ellington, Irving Mills, Juan Tizol) – 3:45
2. "In a Mellow Tone" (Ellington, Milt Gabler) – 2:54
3. "Solid Old Man" – 3:35
4. "Spiritual (Come Sunday)/Work Song" – 12:06
5. "The Blues" – 5:08
6. "Rugged Romeo" – 3:09
7. "Sono" – 5:04
8. "Air-Conditioned Jungle" (Ellington, Jimmy Hamilton) – 5:45
9. "Pitter Panther Patter" – 2:14
10. "Take the "A" Train" (Billy Strayhorn) – 3:26
11. "Mellow Ditty" – 7:30
12. "Fugueaditty" – 2:40
13. "Jam-A-Ditty" – 3:34
14. "Magenta Haze" – 4:41
15. "Diminuendo in Blue/Transblucency" (Ellington/Ellington, Lawrence Brown) – 7:28
16. "Crescendo in Blue" – 3:40
17. "Suburbanite" – 4:32
18. "I'm Just a Lucky So and So" (Mack David, Ellington) – 4:32
19. "Riffin' Roll" – 2:26

- Recorded at Carnegie Hall in New York on January 4, 1946.

== Personnel ==
- Duke Ellington – piano
- Cat Anderson, Shelton Hemphill, Taft Jordan, Francis Williams – trumpet
- Lawrence Brown, Wilbur DeParis – trombone
- Claude Jones – valve trombone
- Jimmy Hamilton – tenor saxophone, clarinet
- Johnny Hodges – alto saxophone
- Otto Hardwick – clarinet, alto saxophone
- Al Sears – tenor saxophone
- Harry Carney – baritone saxophone, clarinet, alto saxophone
- Fred Guy – guitar
- Oscar Pettiford, Al Lucas – bass
- Sonny Greer – drums
- Joya Sherrill (track 5), Kay Davis (track 15), Al Hibbler (track 18) – vocals
