= The Carnegie Hall Concerts: December 1944 =

1977 live album by Duke Ellington

Live album by Duke Ellington
- Released: 1977
- Recorded: December 19, 1944
- Genre: Jazz
- Length: 88:00
- Label: Prestige

Duke Ellington chronology
The Carnegie Hall Concerts: January 1943 (1943)	The Carnegie Hall Concerts: December 1944 (1977)	The Carnegie Hall Concerts: January 1946 (1946)

The Carnegie Hall Concerts: December 1944 is a live album by American pianist, composer and bandleader Duke Ellington recorded at Carnegie Hall, in New York City in 1944 and released on the Prestige label in 1977.

== Reception ==
The AllMusic review by Scott Yanow awarded the album 4 stars and stated: "Lots of great moments from this brilliant orchestra occurred during this concert".

Professional ratings
Review scores
Source	Rating
AllMusic	4/5 stars
The Rolling Stone Jazz Record Guide	5/5 stars

== Track listing ==
All compositions by Duke Ellington except as indicated

1. "Blutopia" – 4:22
2. "Midriff" (Billy Strayhorn) – 4:00
3. "Creole Love Call" – 6:29
4. "Suddenly It Jumped" – 2:50
5. "Pitter Panther Patter" – 2:57
6. "It Don't Mean a Thing (If It Ain't Got That Swing)" – 3:56
7. "Things Ain't What They Used to Be" (Mercer Ellington) – 5:17
8. "Perfume Suite: Introduction" – 0:54
9. "Perfume Suite: Sonata" – 3:15
10. "Perfume Suite: Strange Feeling" – 5:09
11. 'Perfume Suite: Dancers in Love" – 2:33
12. "Purfume Suite: Coloratura" – 3:24
13. "Work Song" – 7:00
14. "The Blues" – 5:25
15. "Three Dances: West Indian Dance/Creamy Brown/Emancipation Celebration" – 6:29
16. "Come Sunday" – 11:48
17. "The Mood to Be Wooed" – 4:47
18. "Blue Cellophane" – 3:15
19. "Blue Skies" (Irving Berlin) – 3:34
20. "Frankie and Johnny" (Traditional) – 8:08

- Recorded at Carnegie Hall in New York on December 19, 1944.

== Personnel ==
- Duke Ellington – piano
- Rex Stewart – cornet
- Cat Anderson, Shelton Hemphill, Taft Jordan – trumpet
- Ray Nance – trumpet, violin
- Lawrence Brown, Joe Nanton – trombone
- Claude Jones – valve trombone
- Otto Hardwick – alto saxophone, clarinet
- Johnny Hodges – alto saxophone
- Jimmy Hamilton – clarinet, tenor saxophone
- Al Sears – tenor saxophone
- Harry Carney – baritone saxophone, clarinet, bass clarinet
- Fred Guy – guitar
- Junior Raglin – bass
- Hillard Brown – drums
- Kay Davis (track 3), Ray Nance (track 6), Al Hibbler (track 10), Marie Ellington (track 14) – vocals
