= The Carnegie Hall Concerts: December 1947 =

1977 live album by Duke Ellington

Live album by Duke Ellington
- Released: 1977
- Recorded: December 27, 1947 at Carnegie Hall in New York
- Genre: Jazz
- Length: 90:05
- Label: Prestige

Duke Ellington chronology
Liberian Suite (1947)	The Carnegie Hall Concerts: December 1947 (1977)	Great Times! (1950)

The Carnegie Hall Concerts: December 1947 is a live album by American pianist, composer and bandleader Duke Ellington recorded at Carnegie Hall, in New York City in 1947 and released on the Prestige label in 1977.

== Reception ==
The AllMusic review by Scott Yanow awarded the album 4½ stars and stated: "The judicious editing out of certain material provides a fresh set list, with little duplication from other live recordings and no overworked hits, making this a wonderful addition to anyone's Ellington collection".

Professional ratings
Review scores
Source	Rating
AllMusic	4.5/5 stars
The Rolling Stone Jazz Record Guide	5/5 stars

== Track listing ==
All compositions by Duke Ellington except as indicated

1. "The New Look (Snibor)" (Billy Strayhorn) – 3:27
2. "Blue Serge" (Mercer Ellington) – 4:16
3. "Triple Play" – 5:39
4. "Harlem Air Shaft" – 3:10
5. "Johnny Hodges Medley: Wanderlust/Junior Hop/Jeep's Blues/Jeep Is Jumpin'/Squaty Roo/Mood To Be Woo'd" (Ellington, Johnny Hodges) – 6:15
6. "Mella Brava" – 3:44
7. "Kickapoo Joy Juice" – 3:37
8. "On a Turquoise Cloud" (Lawrence Brown, Ellington) – 3:33
9. "Bakiff" (Juan Tizol) – 5:54
10. "Cotton Tail" – 3:04
11. "Liberian Suite: I Like the Sunrise" – 4:50
12. "Liberian Suite: Dance No. 1" – 4:52
13. "Liberian Suite: Dance No. 2" – 4:09
14. "Liberian Suite: Dance No. 3" – 3:46
15. "Liberian Suite: Dance No. 4" – 4:13
16. "Liberian Suite: Dance No. 5" – 5:08
17. "Theme Medley: East St. Louis Toodle-Oo/Echoes of Harlem/Black and Tan Fantasy/Things Ain't What They Used to Be" – 6:29
18. "Basso Profundo" – 2:08
19. "New York City Blues" – 4:42
20. "The Clothed Woman" – 4:27
21. "Trumpet No End (Blue Skies)" (Irving Berlin) – 2:42

== Personnel ==
- Duke Ellington – piano
- Shorty Baker, Shelton Hemphill, Al Killian, Francis Williams – trumpet
- Ray Nance – trumpet, violin
- Lawrence Brown – trombone
- Tyree Glenn – trombone, vibraphone
- Claude Jones – valve trombone
- Russell Procope – alto saxophone, clarinet
- Johnny Hodges – alto saxophone
- Jimmy Hamilton – clarinet, tenor saxophone
- Al Sears – tenor saxophone
- Harry Carney – baritone saxophone, clarinet, bass clarinet
- Fred Guy – guitar
- Oscar Pettiford, Junior Raglin – bass
- Sonny Greer – drums
- Kay Davis (track 8), Al Hibbler (track 11) – vocals
