= Never No Lament: The Blanton–Webster Band =

2003 compilation album by Duke Ellington

Compilation album by Duke Ellington
- Released: 2003
- Recorded: 1940–1942
- Genre: Jazz
- Label: Bluebird (RCA/BMG)
- Producers: Orrin Keepnews; Steve Lasker

Duke Ellington chronology
1951 (2003)	Never No Lament: The Blanton–Webster Band (2003)	The Alternative Takes: Vol. 10: 1947–1951 (2003)

Professional ratings
Review scores
Source	Rating
AllMusic	5/5 stars
The Penguin Guide to Jazz Recordings	4/4 stars

Never No Lament: The Blanton–Webster Band is a 2003 three-disc compilation combining the master takes of all the recordings by Duke Ellington's Orchestra during the years of 1940 to 1942 with an additional nine tracks, including five alternative takes and four additional masters. An expanded version of The Blanton–Webster Band, this reissue, according to AllMusic, "truly worth either an initial investment or reinvestment". All About Jazz: New York observed that these performances, from what is often considered "the band in its prime", "not only set the standard for big bands and jazz orchestras, but created an ideal near insurmountable to improve upon". The Penguin Guide to Jazz selected this compilation as part of its suggested "Core Collection."

An earlier collection of recordings from this period was first issued in 1986 by RCA Bluebird containing 66 tracks. This 2003 version draws on the 1999 transfers first issued in The Duke Ellington Centennial Edition: The Complete RCA Victor Recordings (1927–1973) with an additional nine tracks over the 1986 edition, including the Blanton Ellington duos "Pitter Panther Patter" and "Body and Soul".

Ellington put Blanton front-and-center on the bandstand nightly, unheard of for a bassist at the time, together with tenor saxophonist Ben Webster, thus this era of Ellington's ensemble is referred to the Blanton–Webster band.

Bassist Jimmy Blanton was only with the Ellington orchestra for two years, leaving in 1941 due to tuberculosis, and dying the following year at the age of 23. Blanton does not appear on the final 17 tracks of the 2003 collection (CD3 tracks 10–26), having been replaced on bass by Alvin "Junior" Raglin.

== Track list ==
Unless otherwise noted, all tracks by Duke Ellington.

=== Disc one ===
1. "You, You Darlin'" (M.K. Jerome, Jack Scholl) – 3:19
2. "Jack the Bear" – 3:15
3. "Ko-Ko" – 2:39
4. "Morning Glory" (Ellington, Rex Stewart) – 3:15
5. "So Far, So Good" (Jack Lawrence, Jimmy Mundy, E.G. White) – 2:50
6. "Conga Brava" (Ellington, Juan Tizol) – 2:54
7. "Concerto for Cootie" – 3:19
8. "Me and You" – 2:54
9. "Cotton Tail" – 3:08
10. "Never No Lament (Don't Get Around Much Anymore)" (Ellington, Bob Russell) – 3:15
11. "Dusk" – 3:19
12. "Bojangles" – 2:50
13. "A Portrait of Bert Williams" – 3:09
14. "Blue Goose" – 3:21
15. "Harlem Air Shaft" – 2:57
16. "At a Dixie Roadside Diner" – (Joe Burke, Edgar Leslie) – 2:45
17. "All Too Soon" (Ellington, Carl Sigman) – 3:28
18. "Rumpus in Richmond" – 2:46
19. "My Greatest Mistake" (Jack Fulton, Jack O'Brien) – 3:27
20. "Sepia Panorama" – 3:20
21. "There Shall Be No Night" (Gladys Shelley, Abner Silver) – 3:05
22. "In a Mellow Tone" (Ellington, Milt Gabler) – 3:19
23. "Five O'Clock Whistle" (Kim Gannon, Gene Irwin, Josef Myrow) – 3:18
24. "The Flaming Sword" – 3:06
25. "Warm Valley" – 3:20

=== Disc two ===
1. "Across the Track Blues" – 2:58
2. "Chloe (Song of the Swamp)" (Gus Kahn, Neil Moret) – 3:24
3. "I Never Felt This Way Before" (Al Dubin, Ellington) – 3:23
4. "The Sidewalks of New York" (James W. Blake, Charles B. Lawlor) – 3:14
5. "Flamingo" (Edmund Anderson, Ted Grouya) – 3:22
6. "The Girl in My Dreams Tries to Look Like You" (Mercer Ellington) – 3:19
7. "Take the "A" Train" (Billy Strayhorn) – 2:54
8. "Jumpin' Punkins" (Mercer Ellington) – 3:33
9. "John Hardy's Wife" (Mercer Ellington) – 3:28
10. "Blue Serge" (Mercer Ellington) – 3:20
11. "After All" (Strayhorn) – 3:19
12. "Bakiff" (Tizol) – 3:23
13. "Are You Sticking?" – 3:02
14. "Just A-Sittin' and A-Rockin'" (Ellington, Strayhorn, Lee Gaines) – 3:33
15. "The Giddybug Gallop" – 3:29
16. "Pitter Panther Patter" – 3:03
17. "Body and Soul" (Frank Eyton, Johnny Green, Edward Heyman, Robert Sour) – 3:11
18. "Sophisticated Lady" (Ellington, Irving Mills, Mitchell Parish) – 2:47
19. "Mr. J.B. Blues" (Jimmy Blanton, Ellington) – 3:09
20. "Ko-Ko" (alternate take) – 2:40
21. "Bojangles" (alternate take) – 2:46
22. "Sepia Panorama" (alternate take) – 3:24
23. "Jumpin' Punkins" (alternate take) (Mercer Ellington) – 3:42
24. "Jump for Joy" (alternate take) (Ellington, Sid Kuller, Paul Francis Webster) – 2:56

=== Disc three ===
1. "Chocolate Shake" (Ellington, Paul Francis Webster) – 2:50
2. "I Got It Bad (and That Ain't Good)" (Ellington, Webster) – 3:17
3. "Clementine" (Strayhorn) – 2:53
4. "Brown-Skin Gal (in the Calico Gown)" (Ellington, Webster) – 3:06
5. "Jump for Joy" (Ellington, Kuller, Webster) – 2:50
6. "Moon Over Cuba" (Ellington, Tizol) – 3:09
7. "Five O'Clock Drag" – 2:49
8. "Rocks in My Bed" – 3:06
9. "Bli Blip" (Ellington, Kuller) – 3:03
10. "Chelsea Bridge" (Strayhorn) – 2:52
11. "Rain Check" (Strayhorn) – 2:28
12. "What Good Would It Do?" (Harry James, Buddy Pepper) – 2:44
13. "I Don't Know What Kind of Blues I Got" – 3:13
14. "Perdido" (Ervin Drake, H.J. Lengsfelder, Tizol) – 3:08
15. "The 'C' Jam Blues" (Barney Bigard, Ellington) – 2:37
16. "Moon Mist" (Mercer Ellington) – 2:58
17. "What Am I Here For?" (Ellington, Frankie Laine) – 3:28
18. "I Don't Mind" (Ellington, Strayhorn) – 2:49
19. "Someone" – 3:09
20. "My Little Brown Book" (Strayhorn) – 3:13
21. "Main Stem" – 2:47
22. "Johnny Come Lately" (Strayhorn) – 2:39
23. "Hayfoot, Strawfoot" (Drake, Lengsfelder, Paul McGrane) – 2:30
24. "Sentimental Lady" – 2:58
25. "A Slip of the Lip (Can Sink a Ship)" (Luther Henderson, Jr.; Mercer Ellington) – 2:54
26. "Sherman Shuffle" – 2:38

== Personnel ==
- Arrangements are by Duke Ellington, Mercer Ellington, Billy Strayhorn and Ben Webster.

=== Performance ===
- Rex Stewart – cornet
- Cootie Williams – trumpet
- Ray Nance – trumpet, violin, vocals
- Wallace Jones – trumpet
- Juan Tizol – valve trombone
- Joe Nanton – trombone
- Lawrence Brown – trombone
- Barney Bigard – clarinet, tenor saxophone
- Johnny Hodges – alto & soprano saxophone, clarinet
- Otto Hardwick – alto saxophone
- Ben Webster – tenor saxophone
- Chauncey Haughton – clarinet, tenor sax
- Harry Carney – clarinet, alto & baritone saxophone
- Duke Ellington – piano, celeste (on track 3.2)
- Billy Strayhorn – piano (on tracks 2.5 & 11, 3.8 & 10–12, 22), celeste (3.20)
- Fred Guy – guitar
- Jimmy Blanton – bass
- Sonny Greer – drums
- Ivie Anderson – vocals
- Herb Jeffries – vocals

=== Production ===
- Orrin Keepnews – producer
- Steve Lasker – producer, digital transfers, restoration, liner editor, discography
- Charles Harbutt – compilation mastering
- Brian Priestley – liner notes, annotation
- Ben Young – compilation supervisor
- Erwin Gorostiza – design
- Andrew Homzy, John Chilton, Tony Russell – liner editors
- Scott Haag and Cynthia Sesso – photo research
- Duncan P. Schiedt – photography
- Joshua Sherman – A&R
