= Black, Brown and Beige (1946 album) =

Black, Brown, and Beige
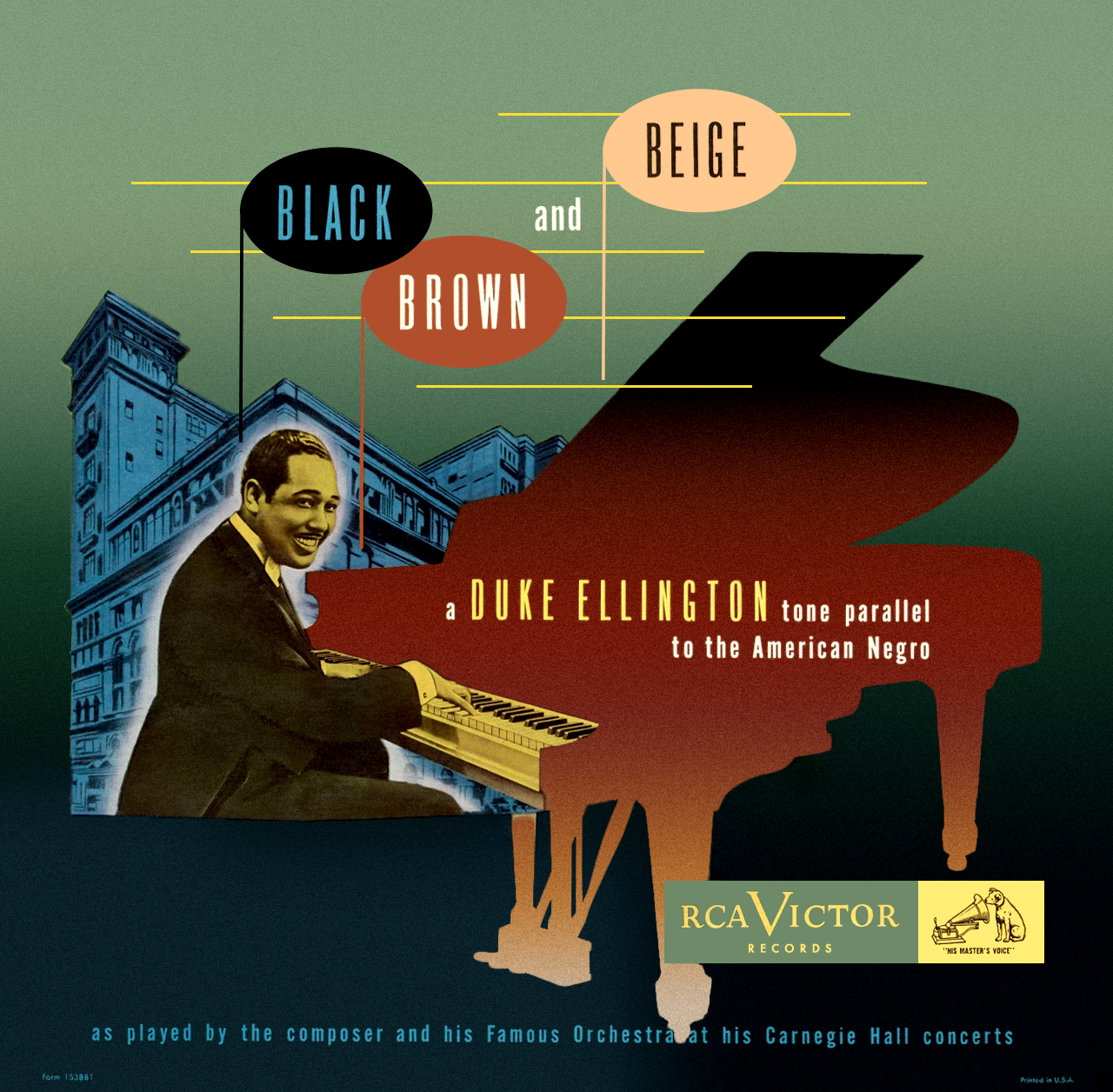

Live album by Duke Ellington
- Released: February 1946
- Recorded: January 23, 1943
- Venue: Carnegie Hall
- Genre: Orchestral jazz
- Label: Victor

Duke Ellington chronology
Ellingtonia, Vol. Two (1944)	Black, Brown, and Beige (1946)	Duke Ellington Plays the Blues (1947)

Black, Brown, and Beige, subtitled A Duke Ellington Tone Parallel to the American Negro, is a live album of phonograph records by Duke Ellington featuring the suite of the same name in live performance in 1943. Released under the Victor Showpiece designation, the album was the first release of the suite, which has primarily been perceived in retrospect as a botched attempt by Ellington to capture his feelings on race in the United States through music. Consequently, it has been studied as an interesting work highlighting Ellington's complex relationship with race relations.

== Background and reception ==
Professional ratings
Review scores
Source	Rating
AllMusic	4/5 stars

Ellington's agency, William Morris, promoted the concert heavily, and articles appeared in Time magazine, Newsweek and The New York Times preceding the event. When performed at Carnegie Hall in January 1943, the suite opened to both positive and negative reviews – Some critics, whether approaching the piece from a Jazz or Classical music background, complained of the wrong blend of the two genres. Record producer John Hammond offered some positive comments on the work, but mainly criticized Ellington for leaving the blues:

But the more complicated his music becomes the less feeling his soloists are able to impart to their work. . . It was unfortunate that Duke saw fit to tamper with the blues form in order to produce music of greater "significance."

Music critic and author Paul Bowles, of the New York Herald Tribune was very critical, stating: "Presented as one number it was formless and meaningless. . . . The whole attempt to fuse jazz as a form with art music should be discouraged. The two exist at such different distance from the listener's faculties of comprehension that he cannot get them both clearly into focus at the same time. One might say they operate on different wavelengths; it is impossible to tune them in simultaneously."

When the album was packaged and released in early 1946, both Radio Mirror and Modern Screen wrote favorable reviews, with the latter praising the composition for its ambition and the former denoting the album "a must". Billboard offered a lukewarm reception: "While it may not be a great musical composition, nor hold the popular appeal of his other pieces, it's Ellington music throughout."

Aside from the criticism of Ellington's technique, some have posed the piece was diminished by Ellington understating his feelings through music, perhaps for fear of damaging his image and reputation with white audiences. Despite this, Ellington was acclaimed for his booking at Carnegie Hall being the first of its kind for African-American performers, and has earned praise for his attempt to use the event to spur a conversation on race.

The album made no appearances on early Billboard album charts.

== Track listing ==
The live suite, recorded February 23, 1943, and edited down to 4 minutes per side in 1946, was featured on a 2-disc, 12", 78 rpm album set, Victor SP-9.

Disc 1: (28-0400)

1. I. Work Song
2. II. Come Sunday

Disc 2: (28–0401)

3. III. The Blues
4. IV. Three Dances
  a. West Indian Dance
  b. Emancipation Celebration
  c. Sugar Hill Penthouse (Beige!)

== Personnel ==
- Duke Ellington – piano
- Rex Stewart – cornet
- Shorty Baker, Wallace Jones – trumpet
- Ray Nance – trumpet, violin
- Lawrence Brown, Joe Nanton – trombone
- Juan Tizol – valve trombone
- Otto Hardwicke – alto saxophone, clarinet
- Johnny Hodges – alto saxophone
- Chauncy Haughton – clarinet, tenor saxophone
- Ben Webster – tenor saxophone
- Harry Carney – baritone saxophone, clarinet, alto saxophone
- Fred Guy – guitar
- Junior Raglin – bass
- Sonny Greer – drums
