= Duke Ellington Plays the Blues =

Studio album by Duke Ellington and his famous orchestra
- Released: 1947
- Label: RCA Victor

Duke Ellington chronology
Black, Brown and Beige (1946)	Duke Ellington Plays the Blues (1947)	Ellington Special (1947)

Duke Ellington Plays the Blues is an album of phonograph records credited to "Duke Ellington and his famous orchestra", released by RCA Victor in 1947.

== Release ==
The album was originally released as a set of four 10-inch 78-rpm phonograph records (catalog no. P 182).

== Critical reception ==
Professional ratings
Review scores
Source	Rating
Billboard	positive

Billboard reviewed the album in its issue from September 13, 1947, writing: "It's the very epitome of Ellingtonia in these eight sides being released for the first time by the label. Recorded just before the maestro left the label, it's the Ellington scoring and shading at its best for these blues patterns." The reviewer concluded that the album would "make for a notable addition to the Ellington library on records."

== Track listing ==
Set of four 10-inch 78-rpm records (RCA Victor P 182)

Side 1
No.	Title	Writer(s)	Note(s)	Length
1.	"Royal Garden Blues"	Clarence and Spencer Williams	Duke Ellington and his orchestra

Side 2
No.	Title	Writer(s)	Note(s)	Length
1.	"Frankie and Johnnie"	Arranged by Duke Ellington	Duke Ellington and his rhythm

Side 3
No.	Title	Writer(s)	Note(s)	Length
1.	"Memphis Blues"	W. C. Handy	Duke Ellington and his orchestra

Side 4
No.	Title	Writer(s)	Note(s)	Length
1.	"Pretty Woman"	Duke Ellington	Duke Ellington and his orchestra Vocal refrain by Al Hibbler

Side 5
No.	Title	Writer(s)	Note(s)	Length
1.	"Beale Street Blues"	W. C. Handy	Duke Ellington and his orchestra

Side 6
No.	Title	Writer(s)	Note(s)	Length
1.	"Transblucency (A Blue Fog That You Can Almost See Through)"	Lawrence Brown—Duke Ellington	Duke Ellington and his orchestra Vocal: Kay Davis

Side 7
No.	Title	Writer(s)	Note(s)	Length
1.	"St. Louis Blues"	W. C. Handy	Duke Ellington and his orchestra Vocal refrain by Marion Cox

Side 8
No.	Title	Writer(s)	Note(s)	Length
1.	"Drawing Room Blues"	Duke Ellington—Billy Strayhorn	Duke Ellington and Billy Strayhorn and one piano

== LP re-release ==
10-inch LP (RCA Victor LPM 3067, 1952)

Side 1
No.	Title	Length
1.	"Royal Garden Blues"
2.	"Frankie and Johnnie"
3.	"Memphis Blues"
4.	"Pretty Woman"

Side 2
No.	Title	Length
1.	"Beale Street Blues"
2.	"Transblucency (A Blue Fog That You Can Almost See Through)"
3.	"St. Louis Blues"
4.	"Drawing Room Blues"
