= Palladium (St. Louis) =

United States historic center

Coordinates: 38°38′29″N 90°13′52.2″W

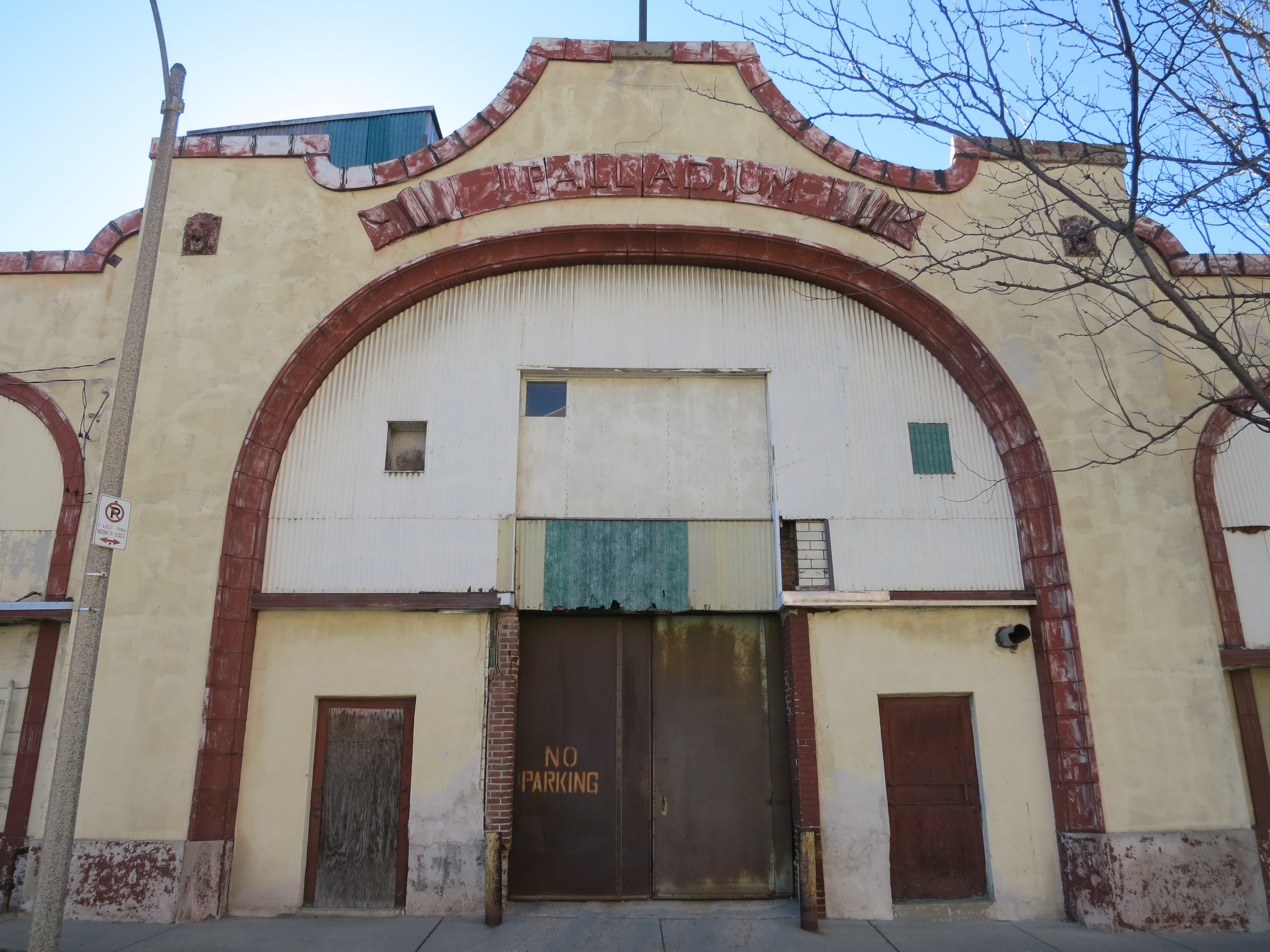
The Palladium in 2013

The Palladium is a disused and endangered historic building in the Grand Center arts district of St. Louis, Missouri. It is especially noted as the site of the Plantation Club, a 1940s and early 1950s dance club where famous African-American musicians performed. It was in some ways St. Louis's equivalent to Harlem's famous Cotton Club and was almost certainly modeled after it.

The building opened in 1914 as the Palladium Roller Skating Rink, although from its early days it also served as a ballroom. In 1940 the Plantation Club night club, which had existed since 1931 on the west end of the block, moved into the building and replaced the roller rink. Like the Cotton Club, the Plantation was owned by a gangster, Tony Scarpelli. And like the Cotton Club, it offered entertainment by African-Americans to a white-only audience. Performers included Jimmie Lunceford, Nat King Cole, Ella Fitzgerald, Benny Carter, the Mills Brothers, the Fletcher Henderson Orchestra, the Noble Sissle Orchestra, the Ink Spots, and Billy Eckstine’s band with musicians Charlie Parker, Lucky Thompson, Art Blakey and musical director Dizzy Gillespie and vocalists Billie Holiday and Sarah Vaughan.

Business boomed during World War II; the club installed air conditioning and offered shows at 11:00 pm, 1:00 am, and 3:00 am. The house band was the Jeter-Pillars Orchestra, which featured Sweets Edison and Clark Terry, and later Jimmy Blanton and Charlie Christian, and also Jimmy Forrest.

The club declined after the early 1950s. Later the building hosted various bars. It was home to thrift shops – Veteran's Village from 1963 to 2006, then HHV Thrift Plus until 2010, since when it has been vacant.

The John Cochran Veteran's Administration Hospital, which is looking to expand, was in talks in the mid 2010s with the owners to purchase and raze the building. As of 2020, there was still no announced decision whether the hospital would expand south (which would imply demotion of the Palladium) or north.

The National Trust for Historic Preservation consequently placed the Palladium (which is not on the National Register of Historic Places) on its 2014 list of most endangered historic places.

In January 2020 part of the roof collapsed, leaving part of the upper floor open to the elements.
