= O Emmanuel (album) =

2016 studio album composed by J.J. Wright

Studio album by Notre Dame Children's Choir, J.J. Wright, and Fifth House Ensemble
- Released: 2016
- Genre: Sacred jazz
- Length: 43:45
- Language: English
- Label: Dynamic Catholic
- Producer: Thomas Moore

O Emmanuel is a 2016 Adventide album composed by J.J. Wright and performed by the Notre Dame Children's Choir, Fifth House Ensemble, and Wright himself. The album is a mix of various genres of sacred music, including traditional choral music, gregorian chant, gospel, and sacred jazz.

== Composition ==
O Emmanuel was composed by J.J. Wright while he was pursuing a doctoral degree at the University of Notre Dame. At the time, he was an intern for the Sistine Chapel Choir in Rome and studying at the Pontifical Institute of Sacred Music. Speaking with Catholic News Agency, Wright described the music as an authentic description of his own Catholic faith and an attempt to combine musical traditions native to the United States with the sacred music of Western Europe. The album takes its inspiration from the spirit of Sacrosanctum Concilium, a Second Vatican Council document calling for a suitable place to be given to musical traditions of the world in the context of religious life. The songs Wright chose to compose for the album were inspired by O Antiphons, Christian prayers sung by Catholics in the final week of Advent during vespers.

== Recording ==
The album was recorded at the DeBartolo Performing Arts Center in Notre Dame, Indiana. The album, produced by Thomas Moore with sound engineer Robert Friedrich, was performed by the Notre Dame Children's Choir and four adult vocalists, alongside the Chicago-based Fifth House Ensemble and Wright, who performs as part of his jazz trio.

== Track listing ==
All tracks are written by J.J. Wright.

No.	Title	Length
1.	"Gabriel's Message"	3:08
2.	"I. Sapientia"	1:46
3.	"II. Adonai"	4:52
4.	"III. Radix"	4:05
5.	"IV. Clavis"	4:51
6.	"V. Oriens"	3:57
7.	"VI. Rex"	5:05
8.	"VII. Emmanuel"	4:33
9.	"VIII. When the Sun Rises in the Morning Sky"	6:19
10.	"IX. Christ the Lord is Born Today"	5:09
Total length:		43:45

== Reception ==
Upon its release, O Emmanuel rose to the top of the Billboard Traditional Classical Albums chart and remained there for eight weeks. Reviews of the album were generally positive. Mary Kunz Goldman, writing in The Buffalo News, described the song's charting as "impressive" in light of the album's fusion of jazz with gregorian chant.
