= J.J. Wright (composer) =

American composer (born 1984–1985)

J. J. Wright
- Born: 1984 or 1985 (age 41–42); Buffalo, New York, U.S.
- Education: The New School for Jazz and Contemporary Music; University of Notre Dame
- Occupations: Composer; conductor; pianist
- Known for: Director of the University of Notre Dame Folk Choir
- Notable work: Inward Looking Outward; O Emmanuel; Vespers for the Immaculate Conception

J. J. Wright (born 1984 or 1985) is an American composer, conductor, and piano player who currently serves as the director of the University of Notre Dame Folk Choir in South Bend, Indiana. He is the composer of O Emmanuel, a 2016 Adventide album that drew upon jazz and sacred music traditions and peaked at number 1 on the Billboard Traditional Classical Albums chart. Wright is a graduate of the University of Notre Dame, where he earned Master of Sacred Music and Doctor of Musical Arts degrees, and of The New School for Jazz and Contemporary Music, where he earned a Bachelor of Arts.

== Early life and education ==
Wright was born in Buffalo, New York. His mother and father, Joanne and Jim Wright, co-founded Catholic F.M. radio station WLOF, which broadcast in the Buffalo metropolitan area. He attended The New School for Jazz for undergraduate education, graduating the school with a Bachelor of Arts. He later pursued a Master of Sacred Music degree at the University of Notre Dame, the institution from which he would later be awarded Doctor of Musical Arts in conducting.

== Professional career ==
In 2014, Wright released his solo debut album, Inward Looking Outward. The album, a series of sacred jazz compositions, received positive reviews. Since then, Wright has published several full albums, including: O Emmanuel, a 2016 Adventide album in the style of sacred jazz that peaked at No. 1 on the Billboard Traditional Classical Albums chart; Vespers for the Immaculate Conception, a 2019 album that fused the improvisational style of jazz with that of a traditional sacred choir; and The Passion, a 2023 jazz-free concept album that used the Passion of Christ as a lens through which to interpret and process the sexual abuse scandals in the Catholic Church. As director of the University of Notre Dame Folk Choir, Wright has also overseen the production of Catch the Spirit, a sacred music album that draws upon the musical traditions of East Africans and of African-Americans.

Wright has also performed as a part of the United States Naval Academy Band.
