= St. Charles Borromeo Church (New York City) =

Church in Manhattan, United States

Coordinates: 40°49′11.0″N 73°56′30.6″W

Church of St. Charles Borromeo
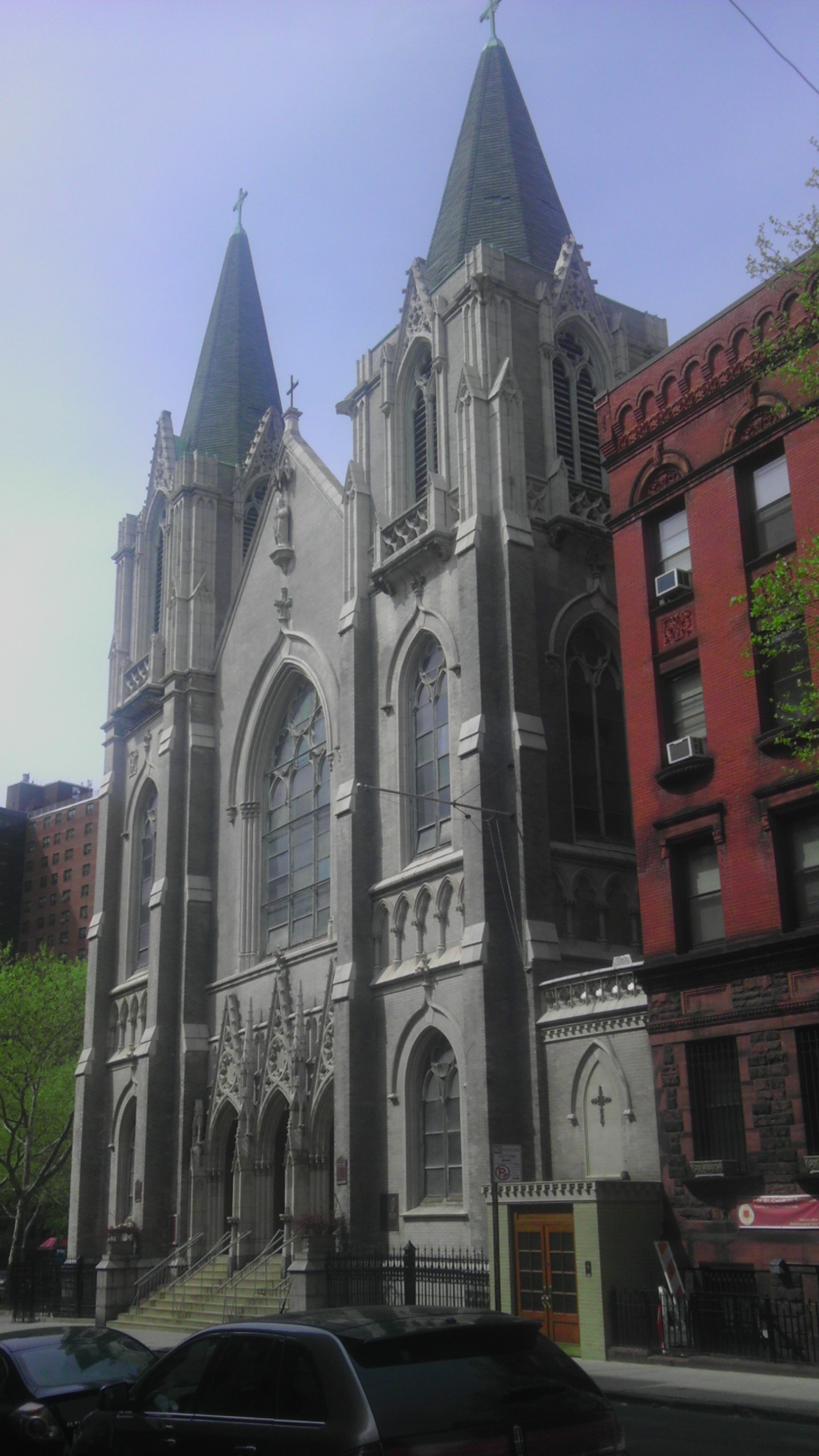
- St Charles Borromeo's Church, 141st St
- Interactive map of the Church of St. Charles Borromeo area

General information
- Location: New York City, United States of America
- Client: Roman Catholic Archdiocese of New York

Design and construction
- Architects: George H. Streeton (for church); Greenberg & Ames of 303 Park Avenue (for 1961 parish school)

Website
- St. Charles Borromeo Church, Manhattan (Harlem)

The Church of St. Charles Borromeo is a parish in the Archdiocese of New York, located at 211 West 141st Street in Manhattan, New York City. It was part of the Harlem Vicariate. The parish was established in 1888.

On May 8, 2015, the parish was merged with that of All Saints Church.

== Buildings ==
In 1892, the address listed for the church was at 2660 8th Ave. The church was built to the designs of George H. Streeton Pastor C. J. Drew had a four-story parish school at 216-228 West 142nd Street built in 1961 to designs by the architectural firm of Greenberg & Ames of 303 Park Avenue.

== History ==
In 1962, part of the public housing project that was under construction adjacent to the church was named in honor of Pastor C. J. Drew; it is now called the Drew-Hamilton Houses.

Eddie Bonnemère performed his "Missa Hodierna" at the church in 1966, the first ever Jazz Mass in a US Catholic church.

Emerson J. Moore succeeded Father Edward Dugan as pastor in 1975, becoming its first African-American pastor. Moore became the first Black monsignor in the United States in 1978. In 1982, Pope John Paul II appointed Moore a bishop and vicar of the Black community, after visiting the parish personally three years earlier.
