= Come Sunday =

1943 jazz standard by Duke Ellington

Song
- Recorded: 1943
- Songwriter: Duke Ellington

"Come Sunday" is a sacred jazz piece by Duke Ellington that has become a jazz standard. It was written as a part of the first movement of a suite entitled Black, Brown and Beige.

== History ==
Ellington was engaged for a performance at Carnegie Hall on January 23, 1943, for which he wrote the entire composition (that whole concert was released in 1977 as The Carnegie Hall Concerts: January 1943). In 1958 he revised the suite and recorded it in its entirety for that year's album titled after the suite. "Come Sunday" was originally a centerpiece for alto saxophone player Johnny Hodges; the 1958 album, which contained a vocal version of the piece with new lyrics by Ellington featuring gospel singer Mahalia Jackson, greatly increased its popularity.

== Notable recordings ==
- Duke Ellington – Black, Brown and Beige (rel. 1946), recording of 1943 Carnegie Hall concert
- Duke Ellington – Black, Brown and Beige (1958, with Mahalia Jackson)
- Dizzy Gillespie – A Portrait of Duke Ellington (1960)
- Carmen McRae - Bittersweet (1964)
- Jennifer Holliday – Say You Love Me (1985), Grammy Award Winner, Best Inspirational Performance, 1986
- Donna McElroy – Bigger World (1990)

== See also ==
- List of jazz standards
