= The Carnegie Hall Concerts: January 1943 =

1977 live album by Duke Ellington

Live album by Duke Ellington and His Orchestra
- Released: 1977
- Recorded: January 23, 1943
- Genres: Jazz, swing, big band jazz
- Length: 119:18
- Label: Prestige P-34004
- Producer: Orrin Keepnews

Duke Ellington chronology
Never No Lament: The Blanton-Webster Band (1940–42)	The Carnegie Hall Concerts: January 1943 (1977)	The Carnegie Hall Concerts: December 1944 (1944)

The Carnegie Hall Concerts: January 1943 is a live album by American pianist, composer and bandleader Duke Ellington recorded at Carnegie Hall, in New York City in 1943 and released on the Prestige label in 1977.

== Reception ==
The AllMusic review by Scott Yanow awarded the album 5 stars and stated: "This two-CD set captures one of the milestones in Duke Ellington's long and extremely productive career, highlighted by his monumental suite "Black, Brown and Beige" in the only full-length version ever recorded by his orchestra... Every serious jazz library should contain this set".

Professional ratings
Review scores
Source	Rating
AllMusic	5/5 stars
The Rolling Stone Jazz Record Guide	5/5 stars

== Track listing ==
All compositions (and arrangements) by Duke Ellington except as indicated

1. "The Star-Spangled Banner" (Francis Scott Key, John Stafford Smith) - 1:12
2. "Black and Tan Fantasy" (Ellington, James "Bubber" Miley) - 6:35
3. "Rockin' in Rhythm" (Harry Carney, Ellington, Irving Mills) - 4:12
4. "Moon Mist" - (Mercer Ellington) - 3:38
5. "Jumpin' Punkins" (Mercer Ellington) - 3:24
6. "A Portrait of Bert Williams" - 2:56
7. "Bojangles" - 3:17
8. "Portrait of Florence Mills (Black Beauty)" - 3:40
9. "Ko-Ko" - 2:23
10. "Dirge" (Billy Strayhorn) - 3:28
11. "Stomp (Johnny Come Lately)" (Strayhorn) - 2:59
12. "Are You Sticking?" - 3:13
13. "Black [First Movement of Black, Brown and Beige]" - 21:52
14. "Brown [Second Movement of Black Brown and Beige]" - 11:49
15. "Beige [Third Movement of Black, Brown and Beige]" - 14:34
16. "Bakiff" (Ellington, Juan Tizol) - 6:36
17. "Jack the Bear" - 3:19
18. "Blue Belles of Harlem" - 6:09
19. "Cotton Tail" - 3:11
20. "Day Dream" (Ellington, John La Touche, Strayhorn) - 4:02
21. "Boy Meets Horn" (Ellington, Rex Stewart) - 5:58
22. "Rose of the Rio Grande" (Ross Gorman, Edgar Leslie, Harry Warren) - 2:33
23. "Don't Get Around Much Anymore" (Ellington, Bob Russell) - 4:39
24. "Going Up" - 3:56
25. "Mood Indigo" (Barney Bigard, Ellington, Mills) - 4:38

- Recorded at Carnegie Hall in New York on January 23, 1943.

== Personnel ==
- Duke Ellington – piano (all tracks exc. 10 & 11)
- Billy Strayhorn – piano (tracks 10 & 11)
- Rex Stewart – cornet
- Shorty Baker, Wallace Jones – trumpet
- Ray Nance – trumpet, violin
- Lawrence Brown, Joe Nanton – trombone
- Juan Tizol – valve trombone
- Otto Hardwicke – alto saxophone, clarinet
- Johnny Hodges – alto saxophone
- Chauncy Haughton – clarinet, tenor saxophone
- Ben Webster – tenor saxophone
- Harry Carney – baritone saxophone, clarinet, alto saxophone
- Fred Guy – guitar
- Junior Raglin – bass
- Sonny Greer – drums
