= Jeter–Pillars Orchestra =

American jazz troupe (1933–1940s)

- Origin: St. Louis, Missouri, United States
- Genres: Jazz
- Years active: 1933–1940s
- Past members: James Jeter; Hayes Pillars

Jeter–Pillars Orchestra was an American jazz troupe, led by altoist James Jeter and tenor-saxophonist Hayes Pillars.

== Career ==
Jeter and Pillars were previously members of Alphonso Trent's big band. After that outfit split in 1933 they formed the group, which subsequently became the house band at the Club Plantation in St. Louis, Missouri, their home base for the next decade.

Most of the Jeter–Pillars band served as musicians during World War II, several recruited into the United States Navy by Len Bowden, who also had a band in St. Louis prior to the war. Joining the Navy in September 1942 were James Cannady, guitarist and arranger for Jeter–Pilars; Roy Torian, a trombonist who had been treasurer of the Musicians Equity Association in St. Louis, the "race sub-local of the American Federation of Musicians"; Merrill Tarrant, trumpet; Sykes Smith, trumpet; and Charles Pillars, saxophone, who with his brother, Hayes Pillar, was co-leader of Jeter–Pilars. Elbert Claybrook, trumpet, had also been with Jeter–Pillars but had taken a job at Scullin Steel Mills prior to enlisting. All were sent to Camp Robert Smalls, Chicago, for basic training. Charles Pillars, Torian, Cannady, Smith, and Tarrant remained at Camp Smalls as players in the Ships Company A Band, which also included players from civilian bands led by Jimmie Lunceford, Charlie Spivak, George Hudson, the Carolina Cotton Pickers, Don Albert, and Fats Waller, among others.

The Jeter–Pillars Orchestra served as a training ground for up-and-coming jazz players including trumpeters Harry "Sweets" Edison and Peanuts Holland, bassist Jimmy Blanton, drummers Jo Jones, Sid Catlett and Kenny Clarke, guitarist Floyd Smith, tenor-saxophonist Jimmy Forrest, and alto saxophonist Chris Woods.

In the late 1940s, the group toured the Far East for the USO, before breaking up. The Jeter-Pillars Orchestra recorded four sides for Vocalion Records in 1937. The recordings were:

- "Lazy Rhythm" (their theme song)
- "I Like Pie, I Like Cake"
- "Make Believe"
- "I'll Always Be In Love With You"
