= Ellingtonia, Vol. Two =

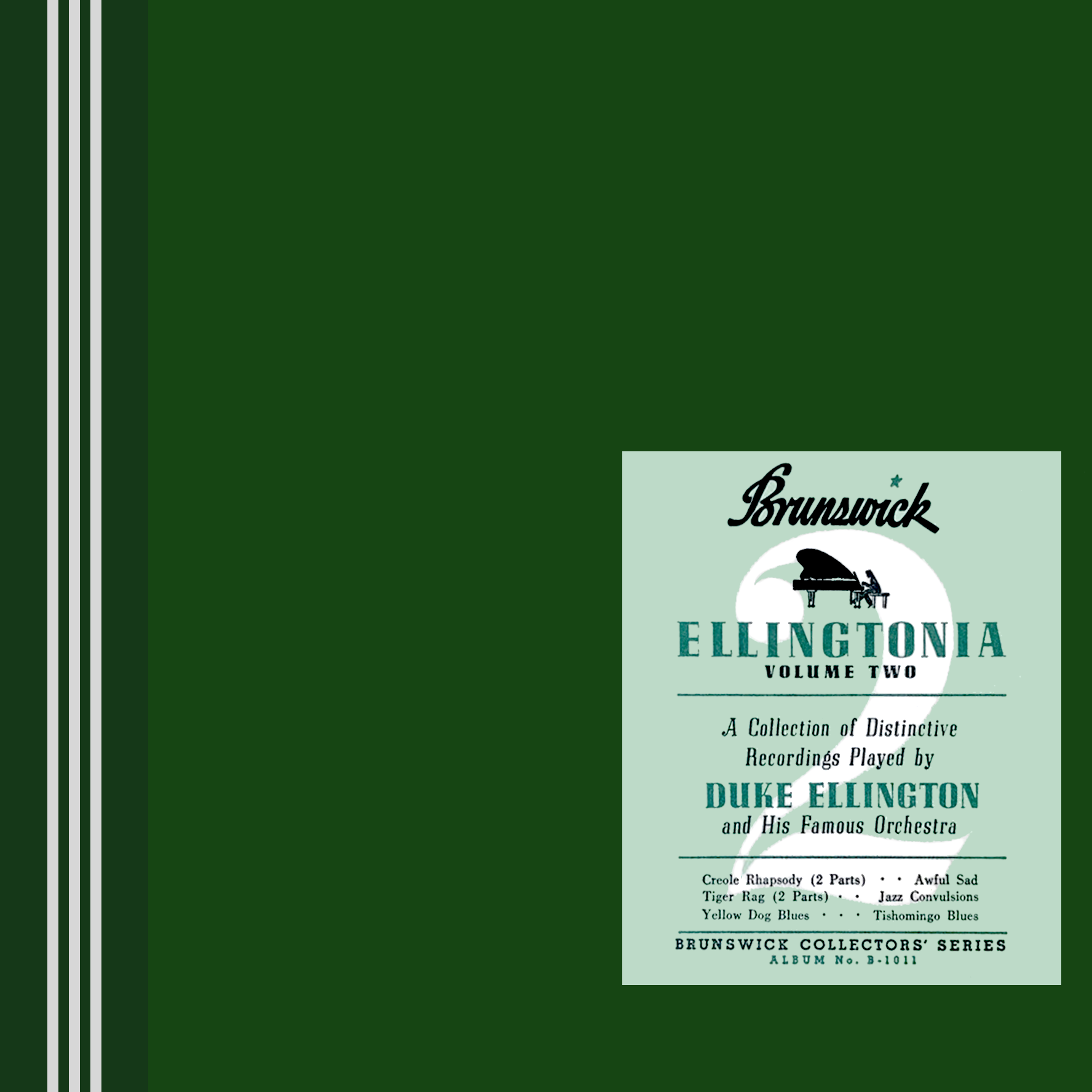

Compilation album by Duke Ellington
- Released: June 8, 1944
- Recorded: 1928–1931
- Genre: Early swing, Ellingtonian jazz
- Label: Brunswick

Duke Ellington chronology
Smoke Rings (1944)	Ellingtonia, Vol. Two (1944)	Black, Brown, and Beige (1946)

Ellingtonia, Vol. Two is a compilation album of phonograph records assembled by Brunswick Records during the American Federation of Musicians strike, cataloguing the famed early recordings of Duke Ellington on Brunswick and Vocalion Records. During the later swing era, the recordings were praised for accurately predicting the developments in the Big band genre several years in advance.

== Reception ==
After Decca Records purchased the Brunswick and Vocalion metal master records, the first volume of Ellingtonia became the series' premiere release, and was well-received by Billboard magazine. This second volume focuses more on Ellington's forays into longer-length pieces.

Keeping in pattern with the earlier set, again the labels replaced group names originally accredited instead of or alongside Ellington, such as the or his "Kentucky Club Orchestra", "Washingtonians", "Cotton Club Orchestra", and the commonly used pseudonym "The Jungle Band" with simply "Duke Ellington and His Orchestra".

The first three discs' A-side and B-sides remain unchanged from their original pressings – Brunswick 6093, 4328 and 3987. "Jazz Convulsions" and "Awful Sad" originally appeared on Brunswicks 4705 and 4110. According to Joel Whitburn, only "Creole Rhapsody" charted, hitting number 18 over a two-week chart stay.

== Track listing ==
These previously issued songs, were featured on a 4-disc, 78 rpm album set, Brunswick B-1011.

Disc 1: (80047)

1. "Creole Rhapsody – Part 1", recorded January 20, 1931.
2. "Creole Rhapsody – Part 2", recorded January 20, 1931.

Disc 2: (80048)

3. "Tiger Rag – Part 1", recorded January 8, 1929.
4. "Tiger Rag – Part 2", recorded January 8, 1929.

Disc 3: (80049)

5. "Yellow Dog Blues", recorded June 5, 1928.
6. "Tishomingo Blues", recorded June 5, 1928.

Disc 4: (80050)

7. "Jazz Convulsions", recorded September 13, 1929.
8. "Awful Sad", recorded October 10, 1928.
