= Eddie Bonnemère =

American musician & pianist (1921–1996)

- Born: February 15, 1921; Harlem
- Died: March 19, 1996 (aged 75) New York City
- Genres: Jazz
- Instrument: Piano
- Labels: Roost Records, Fortress

Edward Valentine Bonnemère (February 15, 1921 – March 19, 1996) was an African-American jazz pianist as well as a Catholic church musician, composer and a public school teacher. His "Missa Hodierna" became in 1966 the first Jazz Mass ever used in a Catholic church in the United States.

== Early life ==
Eddie Bonnemère, a native of New York City, received his education at Saint Mark's Roman Catholic School in Harlem and DeWitt Clinton High School in the Bronx. He furthered his academic pursuits at New York University, earning both a Bachelor of Science degree in 1949 and a Master's degree in music education in 1950.

== Teaching career ==
Following the completion of his Master's degree, he embarked on a notable career as a music educator within the New York City public school system. Over the course of thirty-three years, he taught at various schools across the Bronx, Manhattan, and Brooklyn. His most enduring tenure spanned eleven years at Intermediate School 55 in Brooklyn's Oceanhill-Brownsville area, where he instructed students in vocal and instrumental music. His dedication and expertise led to his appointment as head of the music department.

In addition to his work in the public school system, he remained active in the music community. He served as the director of the Brooklyn Public School choir and held a teaching position at the Community School located at St. Thomas the Apostle Church in Harlem.

Bonnemère's contributions to music education extended beyond the classroom, leaving a lasting impact on countless students and colleagues alike.

== Jazz career ==
Bonnemère already played as a church pianist in Harlem during his school days. After military service in World War II He played with Claude Hopkins, and then received his master's degree from New York University.

In 1953 he led a combo with Ray Barretto in the Savoy Ballroom. In 1955, he had a Mambo band. He joined in 1956 the Detroit club Baker's Keyboard Lounge and released on the label Royal Roost the 10-inch album Ti-Pi-Tin / Five O'Clock Whistle. He followed in 1959 when his trio recorded the LP Piano Bon-Bons and 1960's The Sound of Memory. In 1964 (with the participation of Kenny Burrell) his album Jazz Orient-ed was released on Prestige Records.

In the mid-1960s, Bonnemère was one of the protagonists of an Africanization of the Catholic Mass spearheaded by Fr Clarence Rivers, as part of the Black Catholic Movement. In 1965 he wrote—influenced by Mary Lou Williams—the Missa Hodierna for jazz ensemble and choir, which was first presented in 1966 during a service in Harlem's St. Charles Borromeo Church, making history as one of the first US Jazz Masses ever. This Mass was also performed in the Town Hall together with Howard McGhee's instrumental composition Bless You.

In later years he worked as a church musician and composed the Missa Laetare and other liturgical works. He was also musical director of the Church of St. Thomas the Apostle in Manhattan, whose choir recorded his Mass for Every Season in 1969.

He died in 1996.

== Discography ==
- Missa Laetare (Mass of Joy) (Fortress, 1969)
- Mass for Every Season (Community of St. Thomas)
- O Happy the People (Fortress)
