= All Saints Church (Manhattan) =

Church in Manhattan, New York

Coordinates: 40°48′30″N 73°56′18″W

All Saints Roman Catholic Church
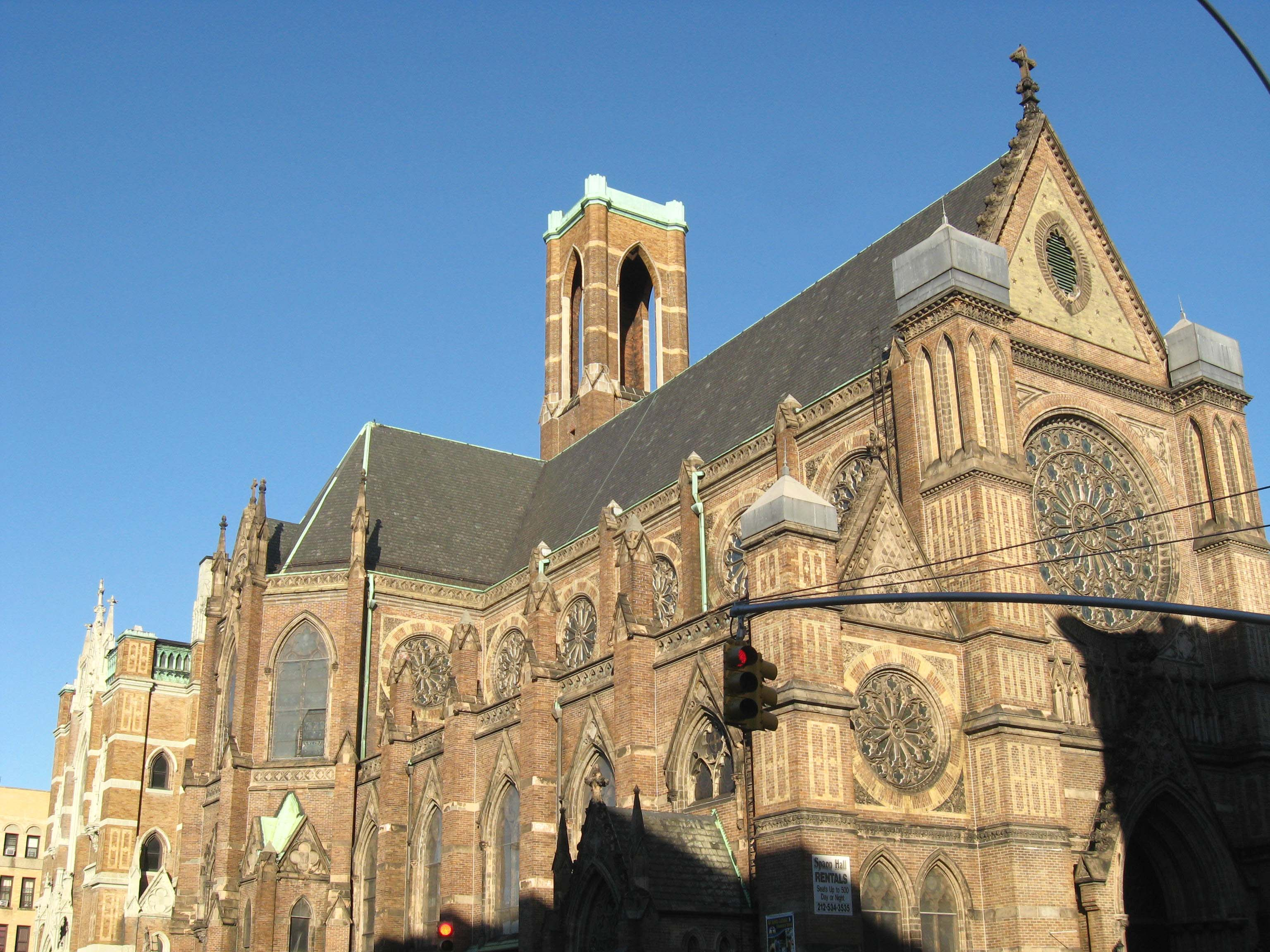
- (2008)
- Interactive map of the All Saints Roman Catholic Church area

General information
- Architectural style: Gothic Revival; Venetian Gothic
- Location: New York, New York, United States
- Construction started: 1886
- Completed: 1889
- Client: Roman Catholic Archdiocese of New York

Design and construction
- Architect: James Renwick Jr.

Website
- All Saints Catholic Church, New York (archived)

The Church of All Saints is a historic former Catholic church in the Archdiocese of New York, located at 47 East 129th Street, at the corner of Madison Avenue in the Harlem neighborhood of Manhattan, New York City.

Built from 1883 to 1886 and designed by architects Renwick, Aspinwall and Russell – but attributed by historian Michael Henry Adams directly to James Renwick Jr. – the church complex includes a parish house (1886–89) as well as a school (1902) designed by Renwick's nephew, William W. Renwick.

The complex was designated a New York City landmark by the New York City Landmarks Preservation Commission in January 2007.

On May 8, 2015, the parish was merged with that of St. Charles Borromeo, and on June 30, 2017, the church was deconsecrated.

On January 23, 2021, the New York Post reported that the complex was to be sold, and a final sale at $11M was announced by Fr Greg Chisholm, SJ on April 1.

== History ==
The parish was established in October 1879, under the supervision of the Rev. (later Monsignor) James W. Power, a native of Ireland, who was its first pastor. The parish was originally intended for the neighborhood's Irish immigrants. As the neighborhood changed, the parish became predominantly African American and Nigerian. It was last staffed by the Franciscan Friars.

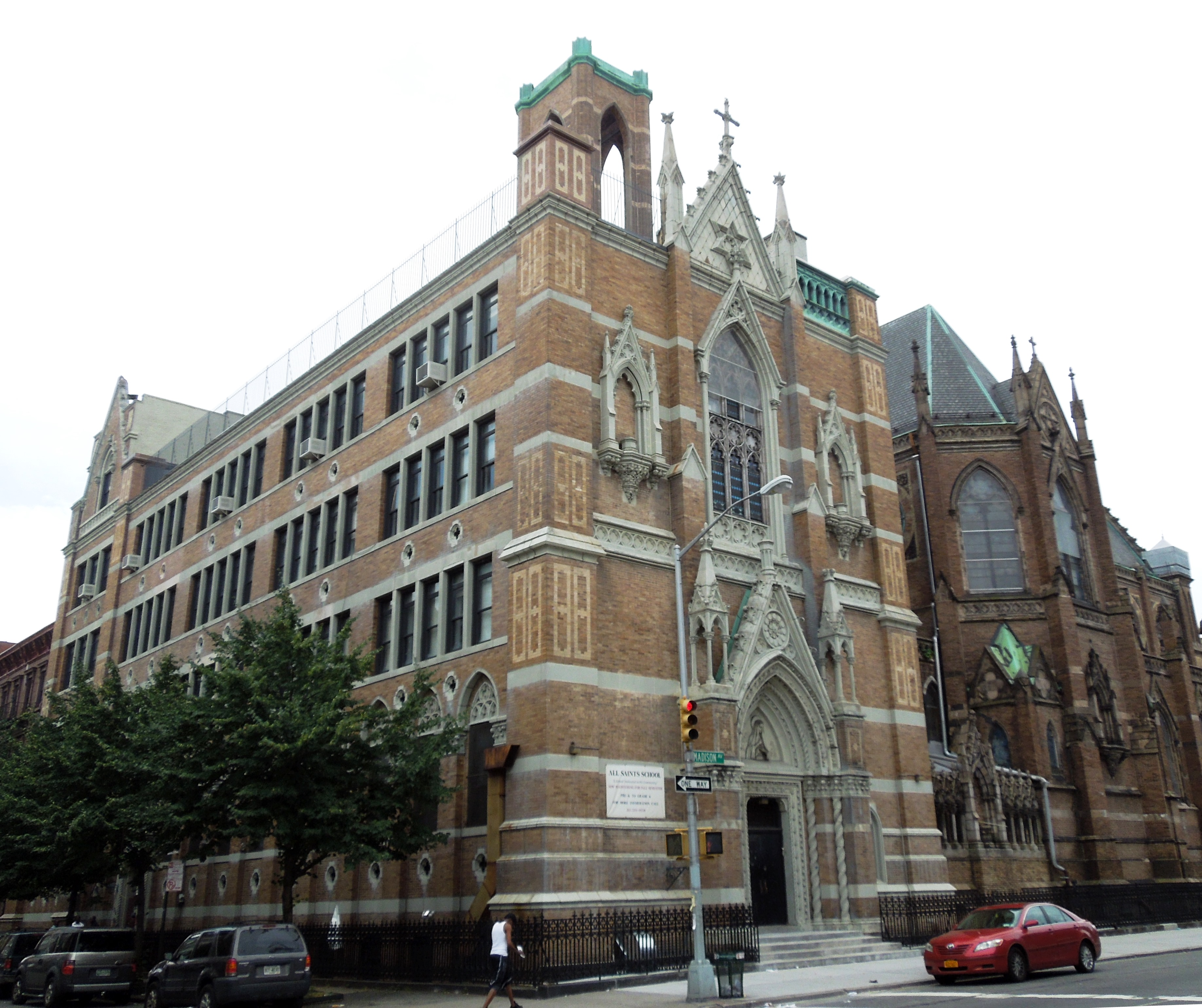
The school

=== Building ===
All Saints is known as the "St. Patrick's of Harlem" because of its size and design, the Gothic Revival, or alternatively Venetian Gothic, brick church with terracotta trimming was dedicated in 1893. The design is festooned with rose windows in the clerestory and a prominent bell tower. "The vaulted interior is also rich in details, including comfortable hand-carved pews, murals and stained glass."

=== School ===
The parish school was built by Power soon after the church, and was initially run by the Christian Brothers of Ireland, who were brought by him to educate the children of Irish immigrants, and the Sisters of Charity of New York. The school's enrollment in its early years reached almost 2,000 students, mostly girls. Within the parish, the Sisters also operated All Saints Academy, which taught 120 high school students, and the Brothers operated All Hallows Collegiate Institute for boys. Additionally, a Home for Working Girls was run by the Franciscan Missionary Sisters of the Sacred Heart.

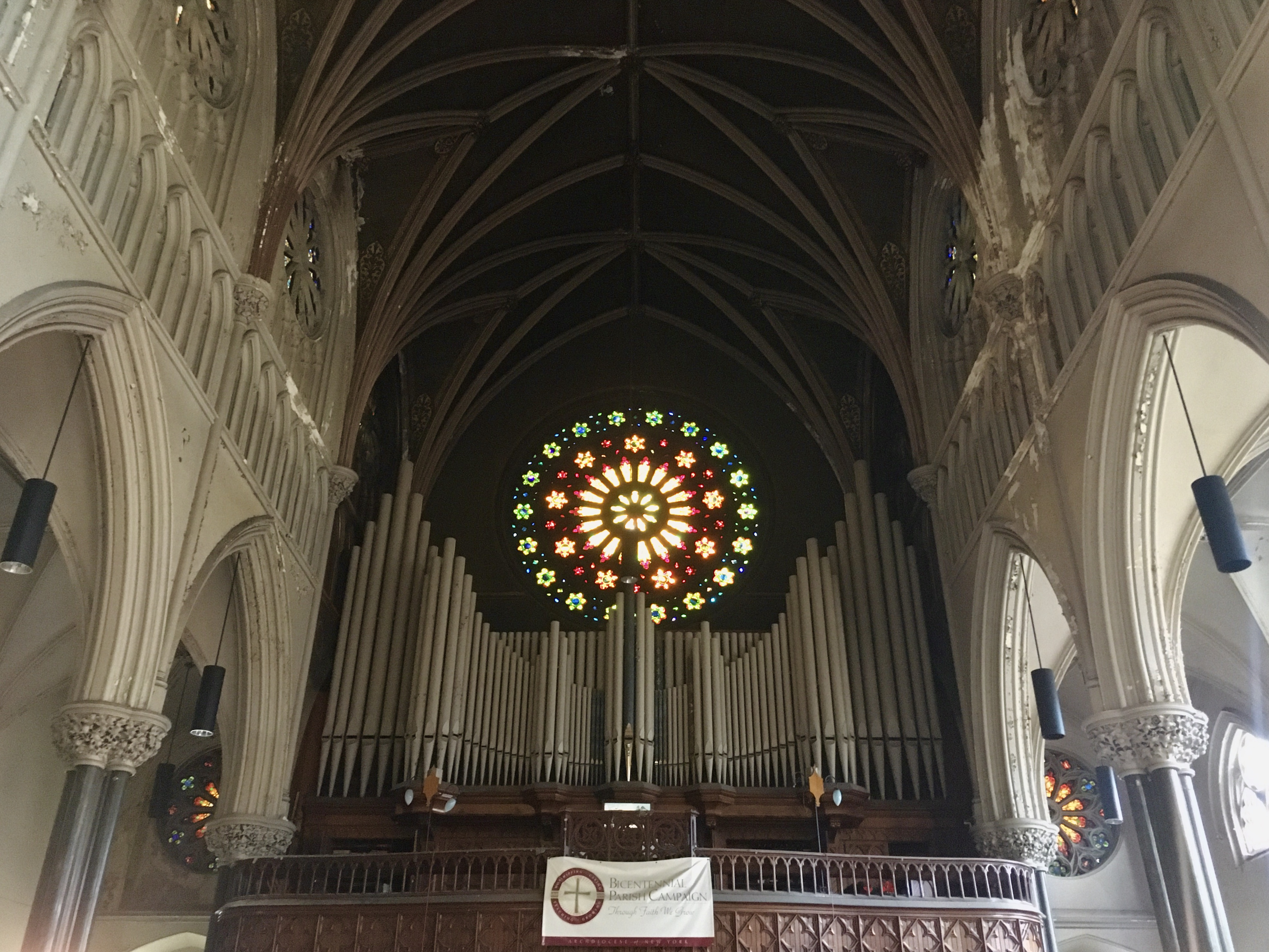
The organ

All Saints School was among 27 schools closed by Archbishop Dolan in the Archdiocese of New York on 11 January 2011.

=== Organ ===
American organ builder Frank Roosevelt of Roosevelt Organ Works built the company's last organ (Op. 525) for All Saints in 1892. In 1931, Welte-Tripp Organ Corp. electrified and enlarged the organ, adding a solo division in the triforium and a new console (in addition to various tonal modifications). In February 2021 the organ was acquired by St. Paul the Apostle Church.
