= Hayes Pillars =

American jazz musician (1906–1992)

Hayes Pillars (April 30, 1906, North Little Rock, Arkansas – August 11, 1992, Richmond Heights, Missouri) was an American jazz tenor saxophonist and bandleader.

Pillar began playing as a teenager, and played locally in Little Rock and Jackson, Tennessee before joining the territory band of Alphonso Trent in 1927-28. On January 6, 1934 Pillars, along with his brother Charles Pillars, and James Jeter, formed the Jeter-Pillars Orchestra, to work at a club called The Furnace. The ensemble which featured a large number of noted jazz sidemen over the course of its existence, was originally "formed out of the remnants of the great Alphonso Trent Orchestra." On July 4, 1934, The Jeter-Pillars Orchestra came to St.Louis at the Club Plantation.

Following his time in Jeter-Pillars, Pillars became a mainstay of the St. Louis, Missouri jazz scene, working there from the 1950s into the 1980s. He would frequently play private parties and in area country clubs.

He retired in the early 1980s and in 1981, the Institute for Jazz Studies at Rutgers University and the Smithsonian Institution in Washington, D.C. honored him for his contributions to American Jazz.
