= Jam Session (1942 film) =

1942 short film

- Directed by: Josef Berne
- Produced by: Sam Coslow
- Starring: Duke Ellington and His Orchestra
- Music by: Duke Ellington
- Production company: R.C.M. Productions
- Distributed by: Soundie Distributing Corporation
- Release date: 1942 (United States)
- Running time: 3 minutes
- Country: United States
- Language: English

Jam Session is a 1942 American short film, directed by Josef Berne, which shows Duke Ellington and his orchestra performing "C Jam Blues".

In 2001, the United States Library of Congress deemed the 3-minute, black-and-white film "culturally, historically, or aesthetically significant" and selected it for preservation in the National Film Registry.

The short 16 mm film was a Soundie, distributed by the Soundie Distributing Corporation for playback in the Panoram film jukebox. Jam Session is included on the DVD Duke Ellington: Early Tracks from the Master of Swing (2006).

== The orchestra ==
In order of appearance:

- Duke Ellington
- Junior Raglin (uncredited)
- Ray Nance
- Rex Stewart
- Ben Webster
- Joe Nanton
- Barney Bigard
- Sonny Greer
