= Premiered by Ellington =

Studio album by Duke Ellington
- Released: 1953
- Recorded: April 6, 7 & 9, 1953
- Genre: Jazz
- Label: Capitol

Duke Ellington chronology
Ellington Uptown (1952)	Premiered by Ellington (1953)	The Duke Plays Ellington (1953)

Premiered by Ellington is an album by American pianist, composer, and bandleader Duke Ellington, recorded in 1953. The album was originally released as a 10" album and was Ellingon's first release on the Capitol label. The album has not been released on CD, but the tracks have appeared on The Complete Capitol Recordings of Duke Ellington, released by Mosaic Records in 1995.

== Reception ==
The Allmusic review awarded the album 3 stars.

Professional ratings
Review scores
Source	Rating
Allmusic	3/5 stars

== Track listing ==
1. "My Old Flame" (Sam Coslow, Arthur Johnston) – 3:13
2. "Three Little Words" (Bert Kalmar, Harry Ruby) – 3:45
3. "Stormy Weather" (Harold Arlen, Ted Koehler) – 3:12
4. "Cocktails for Two (Coslow, Johnston) – 2:58
5. "Flamingo" (Ed Anderson, Ted Grouya) – 3:42
6. "Stardust" (Hoagy Carmichael, Mitchell Parish) – 2:29
7. "I Can't Give You Anything But Love" (Dorothy Fields, Jimmy McHugh) – 3:11
8. "Liza" (George Gershwin, Gus Kahn, Ira Gershwin) – 3:14

- Recorded Capitol Studios, Los Angeles on April 6 (track 4), April 7 (tracks 1–3, 6 & 7) and April 9 (tracks 5 & 8), 1953

== Personnel ==
- Duke Ellington – piano
- Cat Anderson, Willie Cook, Ray Nance, Clark Terry – trumpet
- Quentin Jackson, Juan Tizol, Britt Woodman – trombone
- Jimmy Hamilton – clarinet, tenor saxophone
- Rick Henderson – alto saxophone
- Russell Procope – alto saxophone, clarinet
- Paul Gonsalves – tenor saxophone
- Harry Carney – baritone saxophone, bass clarinet
- Wendell Marshall – bass
- Butch Ballard – drums
