= Carnegie Hall Concert =

Carnegie Hall Concert refers to several recordings made at New York City's Carnegie Hall:

- Carnegie Hall Concert (Buck Owens album), 1966
- Carnegie Hall Concert (Dizzy Gillespie album), 1961
- Carnegie Hall Concert (Gerry Mulligan and Chet Baker album), 1975
- Carnegie Hall Concert (Toshiko Akiyoshi Jazz Orchestra album), 1992
- The Carnegie Hall Concert (Alice Coltrane album), 2024
- The Carnegie Hall Concert (Keith Jarrett album), 2006
- The Carnegie Hall Concert: June 18, 1971, an album by Carole King, 1996
- The Carnegie Hall Concerts (disambiguation), a 1940s series of live albums by Duke Ellington

== See also ==
- The Famous 1938 Carnegie Hall Jazz Concert, an album by Benny Goodman, 1950
- The Carnegie Hall Performance, a comedy album by Lewis Black, 2006
- Live at Carnegie Hall (disambiguation)
- At Carnegie Hall (disambiguation)
