= Black, Brown and Beige =

1943 work by Duke Ellington

Song by Duke Ellington
- Written: 1943
- Genre: Jazz symphony
- Composer: Duke Ellington

Black, Brown and Beige is an extended jazz work written by Duke Ellington for his first concert at Carnegie Hall, on January 23, 1943. It tells the history of African Americans and was the composer's attempt to transform attitudes about race, elevate American music (specifically jazz) to be seen as on par with classical European music, and challenge America to live up to its founding principles of freedom and equality for all.

== Form and characteristics ==
Black, the first movement, is divided into three parts: the Work Song; the spiritual-based sacred jazz tune Come Sunday; and Light. Brown also has three parts: West Indian Influence (or West Indian Dance); Emancipation Celebration (reworked as Lighter Attitude); and The Blues. Beige depicts "the Afro-American of the 1920s, 30s and World War II" according to Leonard Feather's notes for the 1977 release of the original 1943 performance.

== History ==
Ellington introduced the piece at Carnegie Hall on January 23, 1943 as "a parallel to the history of the Negro in America." In writing Black, Brown and Beige, Ellington endeavored to create a jazz composition as sweeping as any classical work, with the following bold statement, "...unhampered by any musical form, in which I intend to portray the experiences of the colored races in America in the syncopated idiom...I am putting all I have learned into it in the hope that I shall have achieved something really worthwhile in the literature of music, and that an authentic record of my race written by a member of it shall be placed on record." At the December 11, 1943 concert at Carnegie Hall, Ellington said, "We thought we wouldn't play it (Black, Brown and Beige) in its entirety tonight because it represents an awfully long and important story and that I don't think too many people are familiar with the story. This is the one we dedicate to the 700 Negroes who came from Haiti to save Savannah during the Revolutionary War", a reference to the Chasseurs-Volontaires de Saint-Domingue who fought at the siege of Savannah.

Many critics gave the concert mixed to negative reviews, believing it was disappointing as both jazz and orchestral music. Ellington responded to critics, saying "Well, I guess they just didn't dig it." He never again performed the entire work in a live concert setting, instead breaking it into shorter excerpts. Ellington reworked a partial version ("Black" only) of the suite for his 1958 album Black, Brown, and Beige, after which "Come Sunday" (featuring Gospel artist Mahalia Jackson on the album's vocal version of that piece) became a jazz standard. The album notes for Wynton Marsalis's 2018 performance states that Black, Brown and Beige has "received its overdue praise with the passage of time."

== Recordings ==
- The Duke Ellington Carnegie Hall Concerts: January 1943 (Prestige Records, a double CD on Prestige #2PCD-304004-2) - a recording of the January 23, 1943 Carnegie Hall premiere
- Black, Brown and Beige (RCA Records, 1988 compilation) - includes excerpts recorded in 1944 at RCA’s studios.
- Black, Brown and Beige (Columbia Records, 1958 release) - a partial ("Black" only) reworked suite, with Mahalia Jackson on vocal
- The Private Collection, Vol. 10: Studio Sessions New York & Chicago, 1965, 1966 & 1971 (LMR Records, 1987 release) - a privately recorded revision of the three-movement piece into a nine-part work, and the most complete studio version of the suite. Eight of the nine parts were recorded in 1965; the other, "The Blues," was recorded in 1971 with vocalist Tony Watkins
- Black, Brown and Beige (Blue Engine Records, 2020 release) - a live performance of the complete original suite recorded by the Jazz at Lincoln Center Orchestra in 2018
- The British-based Alan Cohen Band released a version of Black Brown & Beige in 1973.
