= Lucky Cowboy =

1944 film

- Directed by: Josef Berne
- Screenplay by: Robert Stephen Brode
- Starring: Eddie Dew; Julie Gibson; Bob Kortman
- Release date: 1944
- Country: United States

Lucky Cowboy is a 1944 American two-reel Western film directed by Josef Berne using a screenplay by Robert Stephen Brode. The film starred Eddie Dew, Julie Gibson, Bob Kortman, and LeRoy Mason.
