= Ellington Special =

Studio album by Duke Ellington and his famous orchestra
- Released: 1947
- Label: Columbia

Duke Ellington chronology
Duke Ellington Plays the Blues (1947)	Ellington Special (1947)	Liberian Suite (1948)

Ellington Special is an album of phonograph records credited to "Duke Ellington and his famous orchestra", released by Columbia in 1947.

== Background and critical reception ==
The album compiled recordings made in the 1930s, all the sides were marked as "previously unissued".

Professional ratings
Review scores
Source	Rating
Billboard	positive

Billboard reviewed the album on July 19, 1947, and described it as following: "The label revives its Hot Jazz Series with this second set of Duke Ellingtons, affording collectors rare and some unreleased sides by the full band and the sextet. The music dates back to the early and middle '30's and gives Ellington with his full flush of outstanding soloists, most of whom have since left the band." The reviewer especially liked the track "Slippery Horn", describing it as the "most stiiring and exciting".

== Release ==
The album was originally released as a set of four 10-inch 78-rpm phonograph records (catalog no. C-127).

== Track listing ==
Set of four 10-inch 78-rpm records (Columbia C-127)

All the tracks are marked as "fox trot".

Side 1
No.	Title	Writer(s)	Note(s)	Length
1.	"T. T. on Toast"	Ellington–Mills	Duke Ellington and his famous orchestra

Side 2
No.	Title	Writer(s)	Note(s)	Length
1.	"I Don't Know Why I Love You So"	Ellington–Mills	Duke Ellington and his famous orchestra

Side 3
No.	Title	Writer(s)	Note(s)	Length
1.	"Tough Truckin'"	Ellington–Mills	Duke Ellington's sextet

Side 4
No.	Title	Writer(s)	Note(s)	Length
1.	"Indigo Echoes"	Ellington–Mills	Duke Ellington's sextet

Side 5
No.	Title	Writer(s)	Note(s)	Length
1.	"Blue Mood"	Mills–Hays	Duke Ellington and his famous orchestra

Side 6
No.	Title	Writer(s)	Note(s)	Length
1.	"Delta Bound"	Hill	Vocal chorus by Ivy Anderson; Duke Ellington and his famous orchestra

Side 7
No.	Title	Writer(s)	Note(s)	Length
1.	"Clouds in My Heart"	Mills–Bigard–Ellington	Duke Ellington and his famous orchestra

Side 8
No.	Title	Writer(s)	Note(s)	Length
1.	"Slippery Horn"	Ellington	Duke Ellington and his famous orchestra
