= Taft Jordan =

American jazz trumpeter (1915–1981)

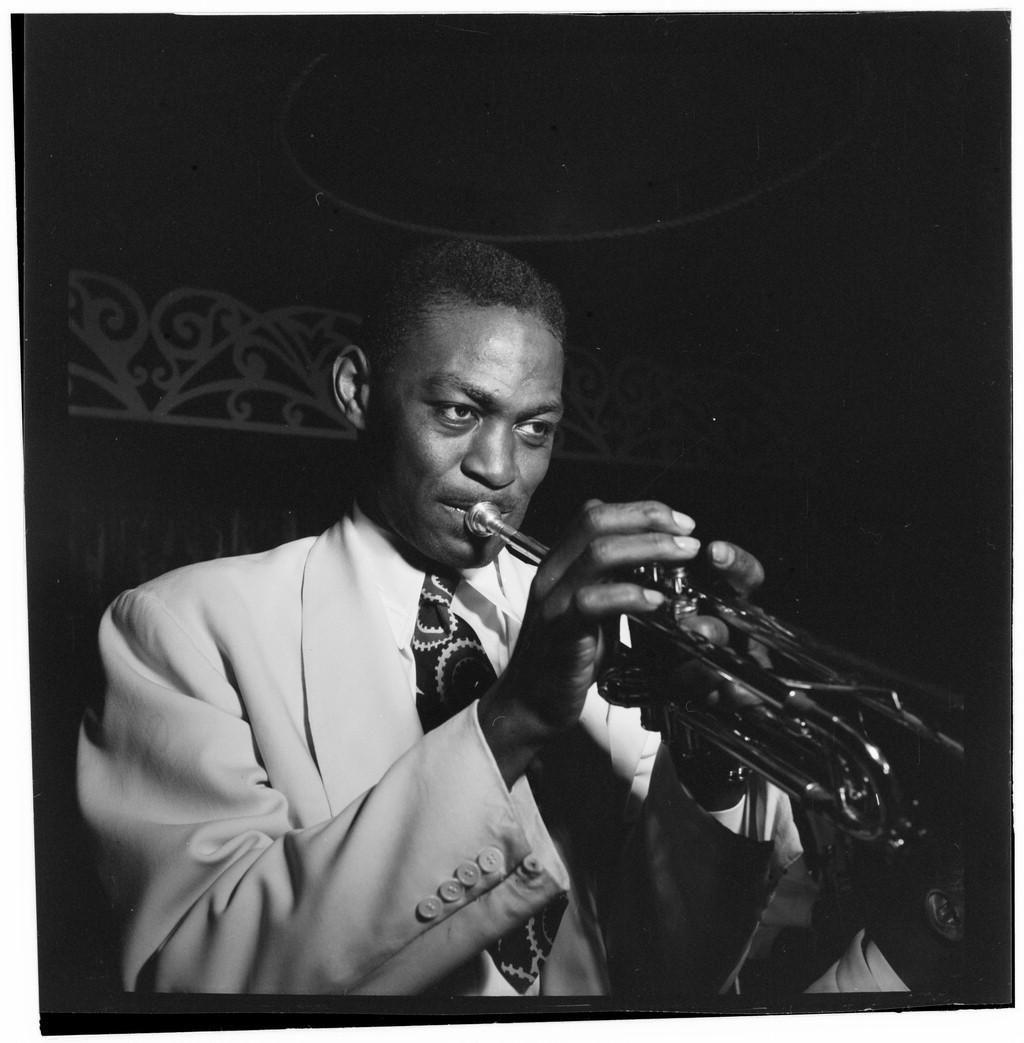
- Taft Jordan performs at the Aquarium in New York in November 1946.

Background information
- Born: February 15, 1915; Florence, South Carolina, U.S.
- Died: December 1, 1981 (aged 66); New Orleans, Louisiana, U.S.
- Genres: Jazz
- Occupation: Musician
- Instrument: Trumpet
- Years active: 1933–1981
- Labels: Mercury

Taft Jordan (February 15, 1915 – December 1, 1981) was an American jazz trumpeter.

== Life and career ==
He was born in Florence, South Carolina, United States. Jordan played early in his career with the Washboard Rhythm Kings, before becoming a member of Chick Webb's orchestra from 1933 to 1942, remaining after Ella Fitzgerald became its leader. Jordan and Bobby Stark traded duties as the main trumpet soloist in Webb's orchestra. From 1943 to 1947, he played with Duke Ellington, then with Lucille Dixon at the Savannah Club in New York City from 1949 to 1953. After this he played less often, though he toured with Benny Goodman in 1958, played on Miles Davis's Sketches of Spain, and worked with the New York Jazz Repertory Company. He recorded four tunes as a leader in 1935, and led his own band in 1960–61 when he recorded albums for Mercury, Aamco Records, and Swingville.

== Discography ==
=== As leader ===
- Skin Tight and Cymbal Wise! with Vic Dickenson, Arvell Shaw, Budd Johnson (Columbia, 1958) – originally billed as The International Jazz Group & reissued as The International Jazz Group Vol. 1 (Disques Swing, 1985)
- The Moods of Taft Jordan (Mercury, 1959)
- Rockin' in Rhythm with Al Sears and Hilton Jefferson (Swingville, 1960)
- Mood Indigo!!! Taft Jordan Plays Duke Ellington (Moodsville, 1961)

=== As sideman ===
With Ella Fitzgerald

- Rhythm Is My Business (Verve, 1962)
- Newport Jazz Festival: Live at Carnegie Hall (Columbia, 1973)
- Live from the Roseland Ballroom New York 1940 (Sunbeam, 1974)
- Ella Sings, Chick Swings (Olympic, 1974)

With others

- Louis Armstrong, I Love Jazz! (Decca, 1962) – one track only + alternate take on some issues (recorded 1954)
- Eddie Barefield, Eddie Barefield (RCA, 1974)
- Eugenie Baird, Eugenie Baird Sings, Duke's Boys Play Ellington (Design, 1959)
- Big Maybelle, The Okeh Sessions (Epic, 1983)
- Ruth Brown, Ruth Brown (Atlantic, 1957)
- Al "Jazzbo" Collins, Presents Swinging at the Opera (Everest, 1960)
- Miles Davis, Miles Ahead (Columbia, 1958)
- Miles Davis, Sketches of Spain (Columbia, 1960)
- Duke Ellington, The Carnegie Hall Concerts: December 1944 (Prestige, 1977)
- Duke Ellington, The Carnegie Hall Concerts: January 1946 (Prestige, 1977)
- Slim Gaillard, Opera in Vout (Verve, 1982)
- Dizzy Gillespie, Jazz Recital (Norgran, 1955)
- Johnny Hodges, Ellingtonia! (Onyx, 1974)
- Geoff Muldaur, Is Having a Wonderful Time (Reprise, 1975)
- Red Prysock, Swing Softly Red (Mercury, 1961)
- George Rhodes, Porgy and Bess (AAMCO, 1959)
- Dakota Staton, Time to Swing (Capitol, 1959)
- Rex Stewart, Henderson Homecoming (United Artists, 1959)
- Chick Webb, Webb on the Air (Trip, 1970)
