= The Duke Plays Ellington =

Studio album by Duke Ellington
- Released: 1953
- Recorded: April 13 & 14, and December 3, 1953
- Venue: Capitol, 5515 Melrose Ave, Hollywood
- Genre: Jazz
- Label: Capitol

Duke Ellington chronology
Premiered by Ellington (1953)	The Duke Plays Ellington (1953)	Ellington ‘55 (1953)

Piano Reflections Cover

The Duke Plays Ellington is an album by American pianist, composer and bandleader Duke Ellington featuring trio sessions recorded for the Capitol label in 1953. The album was rereleased with additional tracks on CD as Piano Reflections in 1989

== Reception ==
Professional ratings
Review scores
Source	Rating
AllMusic	4.5/5 stars
The Penguin Guide to Jazz Recordings	3/4 stars

The AllMusic review by Scott Yanow stated: "Ellington sounds modern (especially rhythmically and in his chord voicings) and shows that he could have made a viable career out of just being a pianist." Pianist Pat Thomas commented: "when people are talking about what's the latest thing, I mean, he's just playing Duke. But he's so far ahead that he can blend in with whatever's going on."

== Track listing ==
:All compositions by Duke Ellington except as indicated

1. "Who Knows?" – 2:37
2. "Retrospection" – 3:58
3. "B Sharp Blues" – 2:47
4. "Passion Flower" (Billy Strayhorn) – 3:05
5. "Dancers in Love" – 1:56
6. "Reflections in D" – 3:35
7. "Melancholia" – 3:20
8. "Prelude to a Kiss" (Ellington, Irving Gordon, Irving Mills) – 3:04
9. "In a Sentimental Mood" (Ellington, Mills, Manny Kurtz) – 2:30
10. "Things Ain't What They Used to Be" (Mercer Ellington) – 2:56
11. "All Too Soon" (Ellington, Carl Sigman) – 3:08
12. "Janet" – 2:15
13. "Kinda Dukish" – 2:32 Bonus track on CD reissue
14. "Montevideo" – 2:33 Bonus track on CD reissue
15. "December Blue" – 2:40 Bonus track on CD reissue

- Recorded at Capitol Studios, Los Angeles, on April 13 (tracks 1–8), April 14 (tracks 9–12), and December 3 (tracks 13–15), 1953.

== Personnel ==
- Duke Ellington – piano
- Wendell Marshall – bass
- Butch Ballard – drums (tracks 1–12)
- Dave Black (drummer) – drums (tracks 13–15)
- Ralph Collier – congas (track 14)
