= All Too Soon =

1940 song by Duke Ellington and Carl Sigman

"All Too Soon" is a 1940 song composed by Duke Ellington with lyrics written by Carl Sigman. It is recorded in the key of C major. It was subsequently recorded by several contemporary and modern artists.

== Notable recordings ==
- Duke Ellington
  - recorded in 1940, available in compilation albums such as Never No Lament: The Blanton-Webster Band (2003)
  - recorded during 1953–1955
  - Unknown Session (recorded in 1960, released in 1979)
  - Ella and Duke at the Cote D'Azur (1966)
  - 1969: All-Star White House Tribute (recorded in 1969, released in 2002)
- Mildred Bailey - recorded on June 13, 1941, for Decca Records (No. 3888B)
- Sarah Vaughan - recorded during 1944–1946, The Duke Ellington Songbook, Vol. 1 (1979)
- Jeri Southern - for her album Jeri Gently Jumps (1957)
- Ella Fitzgerald - Ella Fitzgerald Sings the Duke Ellington Songbook (1958), Fitzgerald and Pass... Again (with Joe Pass, 1979)
- Peggy Lee, George Shearing - Beauty and the Beat! (1959)
- Nancy Harrow – recorded November 2/3, 1960, for Wild Women Don't Have the Blues (1961)
