= Live at Carnegie Hall =

Live at Carnegie Hall may refer to:

- Live at Carnegie Hall 1963, Bob Dylan's six-song live set
- Live at Carnegie Hall (Al Hirt album), a 1965 live album
- Live at Carnegie Hall – 1969, a live album by Joni Mitchell
- Live at Carnegie Hall 1970, a live album by Jethro Tull
- Live at Carnegie Hall (Dory Previn album), 1973
- Live at Carnegie Hall (Bill Withers album), 1973
- Live at Carnegie Hall, a 1973 gospel album by Andraé Crouch
- Live at Carnegie Hall (Renaissance album), 1976
- Live at Carnegie Hall, a 1978 live album by jazz saxophonist Dexter Gordon
- Live at Carnegie Hall (Liza Minnelli album), 1981
- Live at Carnegie Hall, a 1988 live album by The Winans
- Live at Carnegie Hall, a 1988 live album by Sweet Honey in the Rock
- Live at Carnegie Hall (Stevie Ray Vaughan album), a 1997 release of a 1984 recording
- Live at Carnegie Hall: The 50th Anniversary Concert, a 1998 live album by Patti Page
- Live at Carnegie Hall (Anoushka Shankar album), 2001
- Live at Carnegie Hall, a 2001 comedy album by Ray Romano
- Live at Carnegie Hall, a 2003 comedy album by David Sedaris
- Live at Carnegie Hall (David Byrne and Caetano Veloso album), 2012, recorded in 2004
- Word: Live at Carnegie Hall, a 2012 live album by Louis C.K.
- Live at Carnegie Hall (Ryan Adams album), 2015
- Live at Carnegie Hall (Dan Fogelberg album), 2017, recorded 1979
- Live at Carnegie Hall: An Acoustic Evening, a 2017 live album by Joe Bonamassa
- Live at Carnegie Hall, a 2019 live album by Billy Joel, recorded in 1977
- Natalia Lafourcade: Live at Carnegie Hall, a 2024 album by Natalia Lafourcade
- Live at Carnegie Hall (Cameron Winter album), 2026

== See also ==
- At Carnegie Hall (disambiguation)
- Carnegie Hall Concert (disambiguation)
