= Josef Berne =

American film director

- Born: Josef Berstein; January 19, 1904; Kiev, Russian Empire
- Died: December 19, 1964 (aged 60); Palm Springs, California
- Other names: Joe Berne; Joseph Berne
- Occupation: Film director
- Years active: 1933-1950

Josef Berne (January 19, 1904 – December 19, 1964) was a Ukrainian-born American writer, film director and producer. Berne was born Josef Berstein on January 19, 1904, in Kiev, Russian Empire (now Ukraine). He also wrote and directed Yiddish language dramas.

He directed 32 films between 1933 and 1950, most of which were short films.

He died on December 19, 1964, aged 60 in Palm Springs, California.

== Selected filmography ==
- La vida bohemia (1938)
- Mirele Efros (1939) an adaptation of Yiddish play by Jacob Gordin of the same name
- Jam Session (1942)
- Turkey in the Straw (1942), short film starring Freddie Fisher
- Heavenly Music (1943) won Academy Award for Best Short Subject
- Lucky Cowboy (1944)
- They Live in Fear (1944)
- Down Missouri Way (1946)
