= At Carnegie Hall =

At Carnegie Hall may refer to:

- The Weavers at Carnegie Hall, a 1957 release of a 1955 Weavers concert recording
- Thelonious Monk Quartet with John Coltrane at Carnegie Hall, a 1957 concert recording
- Belafonte at Carnegie Hall, a 1959 Harry Belafonte album
- Paul Robeson at Carnegie Hall, a 1969 live album by Paul Robeson
- Odetta at Carnegie Hall, a 1960 live album by Odetta
- Jimmy Reed at Carnegie Hall, a 1961 release by Jimmy Reed
- Judy at Carnegie Hall, a 1961 Judy Garland concert recording
- Miles Davis at Carnegie Hall, released in 1961 by Miles Davis
- At Carnegie Hall (Dave Brubeck Quartet album), a 1963 album by the Dave Brubeck Quartet
- Chicago at Carnegie Hall, a 1971 album by Chicago
- At Carnegie Hall (Liza Minnelli album), a 1987 Liza Minnelli album
- At Carnegie Hall, a 1988 live album by Pavarotti
- At Carnegie Hall, a 1992 live album by Kathleen Battle
- Buena Vista Social Club at Carnegie Hall, a 2008 live album of a 1998 Buena Vista Social Club performance

== See also ==
- Live at Carnegie Hall (disambiguation)
- Carnegie Hall Concert (disambiguation)
