= C Jam Blues =

1942 jazz standard by Duke Ellington

- by Duke Ellington
- "C Jam Blues" performed by Ellington in the 1942 short film Jam Session
- Key: C major
- Genre: Jazz
- Form: Twelve-bar blues
- Composed: 1941

"C Jam Blues" is a jazz standard composed in 1942 by Duke Ellington. One of his most famous pieces, it has been performed by countless other musicians, such as Dave Grusin, Django Reinhardt, Oscar Peterson, and Charles Mingus.

== Background ==
As the title suggests, the piece follows a twelve-bar blues form in the key of C major. The tune is well known for being extremely easy to play, with the entire melody featuring only two notes: G and C.

A performance typically features several improvised solos. The melody likely originated from the clarinetist Barney Bigard in 1941, but its origin is not perfectly clear.

It was also known as "Duke's Place", with lyrics added by Bill Katts, Bob Thiele and Ruth Roberts.

== Notable performances ==
- The song is performed in the "soundie" Jam Session, produced in 1942. The video depicts a jam session where Ellington begins playing with a double bass before gradually being joined by other members of his band, among them drummer Sonny Greer and trumpeter Rex Stewart.
- Western Swing band leader Bob Wills and His Texas Playboys recorded the song sometime between 1945 and 1947 as part of The Tiffany Transcriptions.
- Bill Doggett recorded a version on his 1958 tribute album Salute to Duke Ellington (King).
- "C Jam Blues" was used by the Bonzo Dog Doo-Dah Band as the basis of their song "The Intro and the Outro".
- Mulgrew Miller and Niels-Henning Ørsted Pedersen included the song in their 1999 album The Duets.
- The Dave Brubeck Quartet performed this live at the 1958 Newport Jazz Festival; the recording appears in their album Newport 1958.
- Tenor saxophonist Illinois Jacquet performed the song with former President Bill Clinton at his 1993 inaugural ball.
