= Tyree Glenn =

American trombonist and vibraphonist (1912–1974)

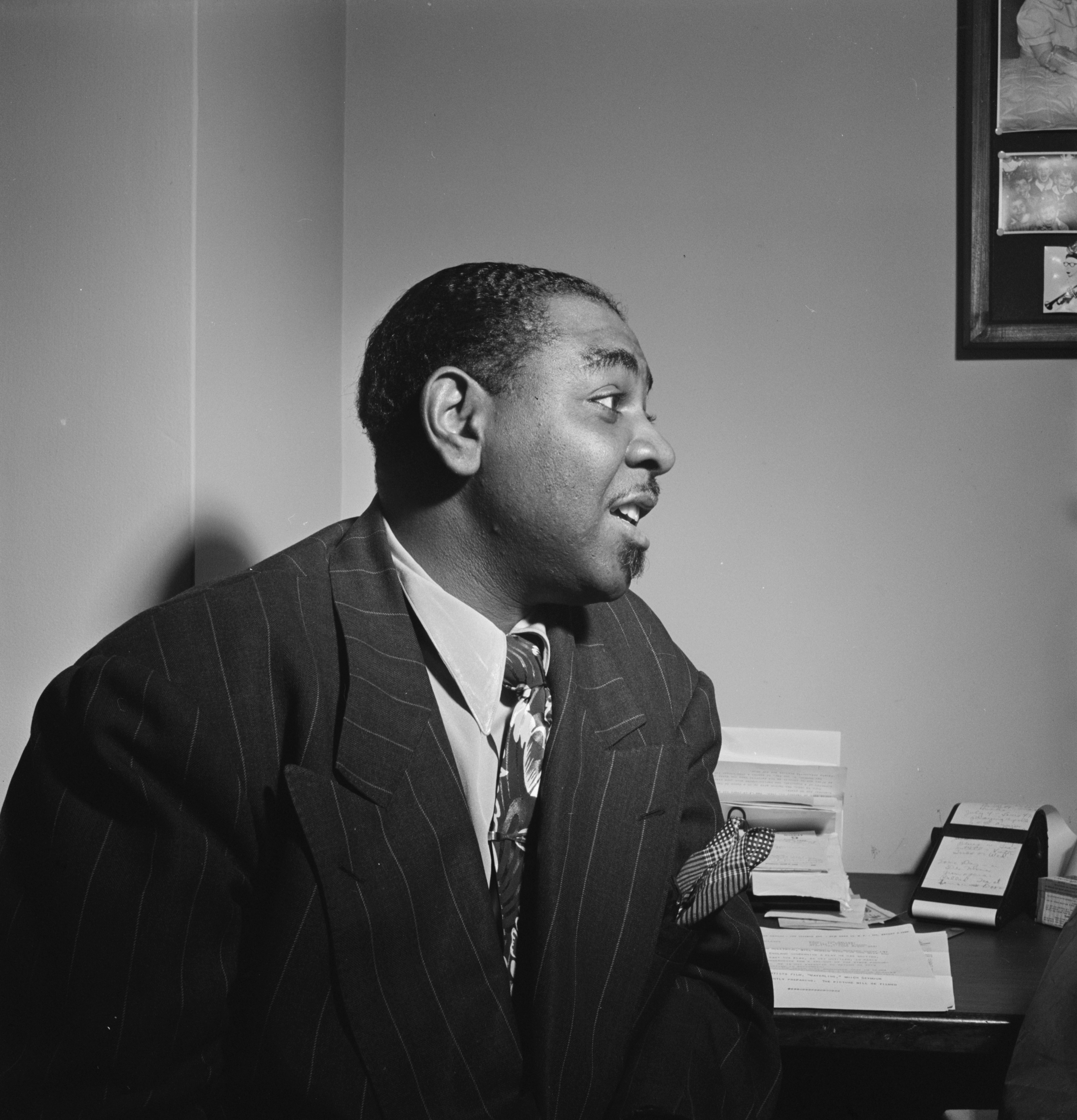
- Glenn in 1947; by William P. Gottlieb

Background information
- Born: William Tyree Glenn; November 23, 1912
- Origin: Corsicana, Texas, U.S.
- Died: May 18, 1974 (aged 61) Englewood, New Jersey, U.S.
- Genres: Jazz; swing
- Occupations: Musician; bandeader
- Instruments: Trombone; vibraphone
- Years active: 1930s–1960s

Tyree Glenn (born William Tyree Glenn; November 23, 1912, Corsicana, Texas, – May 18, 1974, Englewood, New Jersey), was an American trombonist and vibraphonist.

== Biography ==
Tyree played the trombone and vibraphone with local Texas bands before moving in the early 1930s to Washington, D.C., where he performed with several prominent bands of the swing era. He played with Bob Young (1930) and then joined Tommy Myles's band (1934–36). After he left Myles, he moved to the West Coast, playing with groups headed by Charlie Echols (1936). Further, he played with Eddie Barefield (1936), Eddie Mallory's band (1937) and Benny Carter (1937), and with Cab Calloway from 1939 to 1946.

He toured Europe with Don Redman's big band (1946). From 1947 to 1951, he played with Duke Ellington as a wah-wah trombonist, in the style originating with Tricky Sam Nanton, and as Ellington's only vibraphonist, being well-featured on his Liberian Suite. After, he played with Howard Biggs's Orchestra.

During the 1950s, Glenn did studio work; led his quartet at the Embers; did some television, radio and acting work; and freelanced in swing and Dixieland settings. In 1953, he joined Jack Sterling's New York daily radio show, with which he remained until 1963. During 1965–68, he toured the world with Louis Armstrong's All-Stars, with whom he performed until Armstrong died in 1971. Later, Glenn led his own group during his last few years.

Glenn was also a studio musician and actor. He wrote "Sultry Serenade", which was recorded by Duke Ellington and Erroll Garner. With lyrics added by Allan Roberts, the song became known as "How Could You Do a Thing Like That to Me?" and was recorded by Frank Sinatra.

Glenn lived in Englewood, New Jersey, where he died of cancer at the age of 61. He was survived by two sons, Tyree Jr. and Roger, both musicians.

== Discography ==
Glenn posing in front of Swedish tour posters, New York, 1947; by William P. Gottlieb

- 1957: At the Embers
- 1958: Tyree Glenn at the Roundtable
- 1958: Tyree Glenn's at the London House
- 1959: Try A Little Tenderness – Tyree Glenn with Strings
- 1960: Let’s Have a Ball – The Tyree Glenn Quintet
- 1961: At the London House in Chicago
- 1962: Trombone Artistry

With Louie Bellson and Gene Krupa

- The Mighty Two (Roulette, 1963)

With Buck Clayton

- All the Cats Join In (Columbia, 1956)

With Jack Sterling Quintet

- Cocktail Swing (Harmony/Columbia, 1959)

With Clark Terry

- Duke with a Difference (Riverside, 1957)

== Awards ==
- 2013: Independent Music Awards, Satchmo at the National Press Club: Red Beans and Rice-ly Yours, Best Reissue Album
