= Sacred jazz =

Jazz composed and performed with religious intent

Sacred jazz is jazz composed and performed with religious intent.

== History ==
Jazz has always incorporated aspects of African American sacred music including spirituals and hymns, which jazz musicians often performed renditions of as part of their repertoire. Many other jazz artists also borrowed from black gospel music. Before World War II, American churches, black and white, regarded jazz and blues with suspicion or outright hostility as "the devil's music". It was only after World War II that a few jazz musicians began to compose and perform extended works intended for religious settings or expression.

Since the 1950s, sacred and liturgical music has been performed and recorded by many jazz composers and musicians, combining black gospel music and jazz to produce "sacred jazz", similar in religious intent, but differing in gospel's lack of extended instrumental passages, instrumental improvisation, hymn-like structure, and concern with social and political issues. Mahalia Jackson and Rosetta Tharpe contributed to gospel and sacred jazz along with pianist and composer Mary Lou Williams, known for her Jazz Masses in the 1950s, and Duke Ellington. Ellington included "Come Sunday" and "Twenty-third Psalm" in Black, Brown and Beige, an album he recorded in 1958 with Jackson.

The societal changes of the 1960s included changes in attitudes toward the arts in both the Catholic and Protestant churches, which slowly became more open to the liturgical use of jazz. Mary Lou Williams continued composing sacred jazz, including her "Black Christ of the Andes" (1964) in honor of newly canonized Martin De Porres, and Duke Ellington wrote three Sacred Concerts: 1965 – A Concert of Sacred Music; 1968 – Second Sacred Concert; 1973 – Third Sacred Concert. Other artists including John Coltrane, Dave Brubeck, Lalo Schifrin and Vince Guaraldi performed and recorded major sacred jazz works. Most works were in the Christian tradition, but some were inspired by Asian and African religious traditions, such as John Coltrane's "A Love Supreme," Alice Coltrane's "Universal Consciousness", and Pharoah Sanders' "Karma".

One of the most popular figures in the modern form of the genre is the African-American saxophonist Kirk Whalum, whose fusion of jazz and Black Gospel music has garnered a litany of Grammy Award nominations and produced a number of bestselling albums.

== Jazz Mass ==
The most common form of sacred jazz is the Jazz Mass. Although most often performed in a concert setting rather than church worship setting, this form has many examples. Eminent examples of composers of the Jazz Mass include Mary Lou Williams and Eddie Bonnemère. Having become disillusioned with her life as a secular performer, Williams converted to Catholicism in 1954. She proceeded to compose three Masses in the jazz idiom: - The Pittsburgh Mass, another which was composed in 1968 to honor the recently (April 1968) assassinated Martin Luther King Jr. and the third was commissioned by a pontifical commission. It was performed once in 1975 in St Patrick's Cathedral in New York City. Williams pursued composing and advocating for sacred jazz as a divine vocation.

In 1966 Joe Masters recorded "Jazz Mass" for Columbia Records. A jazz ensemble was joined by soloists and choir using the English text of the Roman Catholic Mass. Other examples include "Jazz Mass in Concert" by Lalo Schiffrin (Aleph Records, 1998, UPC 0651702632725) and "Jazz Mass" by Vince Guaraldi (Fantasy Records, 1965). In England, classical composer Will Todd recorded his "Jazz Missa Brevis" with jazz ensemble, soloists and the St Martin's Voices on a 2018 Signum Records release, "Passion Music/Jazz Missa Brevis" also released as "Mass in Blue," and jazz organist James Taylor composed "The Rochester Mass" (Cherry Red Records, 2015). In a dissertation in 2013, Angelo Versace put forth bassist Ike Sturm and New York composer Deanna Witkowski as contemporary exemplars of sacred and liturgical jazz.

== Other sacred jazz ==
Although including the word Mass in its title, the "Abyssinian Mass" by Wynton Marsalis—himself raised a Catholic—is not, strictly speaking, a setting of the Catholic Mass but fuses traditions of New Orleans and big band jazz with worship in the Black Church, including Scripture, prayer, sermon, processional and recessional. A recording of a performance lasting two hours, which featured the Jazz at Lincoln Center Orchestra with Marsalis, Damien Sneed and Chorale Le Chateau, was released on Blue Engine Records in 2016. The expansive work was commissioned in honor of the 200th anniversary of the Abyssinian Baptist Church in New York City's Harlem. The sermon section features the church's pastor, Rev. Calvin O. Butts III, whose message is inclusively interfaith. However, Christian doctrine is retained in the jazz settings of the Lord's Prayer, Gloria Patri and Doxology. The work, which has antecedents in Marsalis' previous work, was performed both at the church and Lincoln Center in New York City and on a national tour.

Pianist Cyrus Chestnut grew up performing gospel and hearing jazz in Baltimore before obtain a master's degree from Berklee College of Music. He has consistently recorded and performed sacred jazz throughout his successful career.

After 1990, Charles Gayle frequently composed, performed and recorded sacred jazz in the free jazz idiom playing a number of instruments with various jazz musicians.

Versace offered detailed profiles of Witkowski and Sturm and brief profiles of many other contributors to the sacred jazz movement.
