= Jimmy Blanton =

American jazz double bassist (1918–1942)

Background information
- Born: James Blanton; October 5, 1918; Chattanooga, Tennessee, U.S.
- Died: July 30, 1942 (aged 23) Duarte, California, U.S.
- Genres: Jazz; swing; big band
- Occupation: Musician
- Instrument: Double bass
- Years active: 1936–41

James "Jimmie" Blanton (October 5, 1918 – July 30, 1942) was an American jazz double bassist. Blanton is credited with being the originator of more complex pizzicato and arco bass solos in a jazz context than previous bassists. Nicknamed "Jimmie", due to his fondness for the Jimmie Lunceford Orchestra, Blanton's nickname is usually misspelled as "Jimmy", including by Duke Ellington.

== Early life ==
Blanton was born in Chattanooga, Tennessee. His mother, Gertrude, was a well-known music teacher in Chattanooga, and he spent much of his youth playing in bands led by her. He originally learned to play the violin, but took up the bass while at Tennessee State University, performing with the Tennessee State Collegians from 1936 to 1937, and during the vacations with Fate Marable.

== Later life and career ==
Blanton left university in 1938 to play full-time in St. Louis with the Jeter-Pillars Orchestra. Blanton joined Duke Ellington's band in October 1939 when the Ellington Orchestra came to St. Louis for a residence, and the band became enamored with Blanton's playing at local late-night jam sessions. Ellington offered Blanton the job the same night he met him. On November 22 of that year, Blanton and Ellington recorded two tracks – "Blues" and "Plucked Again" – which were the first commercially recorded piano–bass duets. Further duet recordings were made in 1940, and Blanton was also featured in orchestra tracks. In May 1940, the band recorded hits such as "Jack the Bear" and "Ko-Ko", which featured Blanton's chops. He was soon the talk of the town everywhere the Ellington Orchestra went. Extremely dedicated to his craft, he was always practicing. He formed relationships with bass players of local symphonies when on the road, and he developed an especially close friendship with tenor saxophonist Ben Webster, who had also recently joined the Ellington Orchestra.

Ellington put Blanton front-and-center on the bandstand nightly, unheard of for a bassist at the time. Such was his importance to Ellington's band at the time, together with tenor saxophonist Webster, that it became known informally as the Blanton–Webster band. Blanton also played in the "small group" sessions led by Barney Bigard, Rex Stewart, Johnny Hodges, and Cootie Williams in 1940–41.

"Blanton also took part in a few of the informal jam sessions at Minton's Playhouse in New York that contributed to the genesis of the bop style." It has been said that electric guitarist Charlie Christian was also present for some of those sessions, and that the two were friends.

During the Summer of 1941, while the Ellington band was performing the landmark musical Jump for Joy, Blanton began to show symptoms of tuberculosis. His condition progressively worsened in late 1941, and in November, he was forced to leave the band and seek full-time medical care. Blanton died on July 30, 1942, at a sanatorium in Duarte, California, aged 23.

== Playing style and influence ==
When with the Jeter-Pillars Orchestra, Blanton added classical music pizzicato and arco techniques to jazz bass, making it into more of a solo instrument. While with Ellington, Blanton revolutionized the way the double bass was used in jazz. His virtuosity placed him in a different class from his predecessors, making him the first master of the jazz bass and demonstrating its potential as a solo instrument. "He possessed great dexterity and range, roundness of tone, accurate intonation, and above all an unprecedented sense of swing." He added "many non-harmonic passing notes in his accompaniment lines, giving them a contrapuntal flavour and stimulating soloists to their own harmonic explorations." His originality was developed by others into the foundations of the bebop rhythm section.

== Discography ==
- Never No Lament: The Blanton–Webster Band (Bluebird, 2003)
- Things Ain't What They Used To Be (RCA Victor, 1966)
- Duke Ellington and Jimmy Blanton (His Master's Voice, 7EG 8189) – recorded in Chicago, October 1, 1940
