= Kay Davis =

American jazz singer (1920–2012)

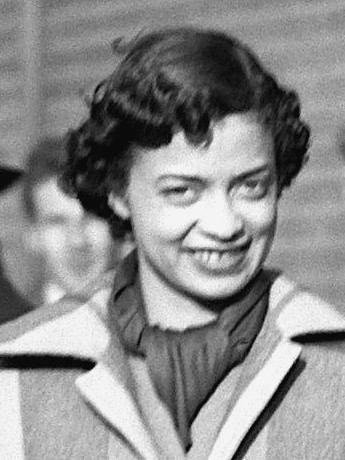
- Kay Davis in 1950
- Born: Kathryn Elizabeth Wimp; December 5, 1920; Evanston, Illinois
- Died: January 27, 2012 (aged 91); Apopka, Florida
- Occupation: Singer
- Spouse: Edward Wimp (m. 1950-2012; her death)
- Children: 1

Kathryn Elizabeth Wimp, known professionally as Kay Davis (December 5, 1920 – January 27, 2012) was an American jazz singer who performed with the Duke Ellington orchestra.

== Early life ==
Kay Davis was born Kathryn Elizabeth Wimp in Evanston, Illinois, and attended Evanston Township High School. She studied voice and piano at Northwestern University, where she received her bachelor's degree in 1942, and her master's degree in 1943. Her grandfather, William H. Twiggs, was a civic leader for whom a park in Evanston is named.

In 1944, she joined Duke Ellington's orchestra, where she sang alongside Joya Sherrill and Al Hibbler. She is best known for her wordless vocals in famous Ellington songs such as "Transbluency" and "On a Turquoise Cloud." She also sang songs with lyrics such as "Brown Penny" and "When I Walk Without You". Davis was also chosen by Ellington to reprise Adelaide Hall's wordless vocal on the song, "Creole Love Call". As well, Davis gave the debut performance of pianist Billy Strayhorn's new song "Lush Life" on November 13, 1948 at Carnegie Hall, with Billy playing alongside her. Davis also appeared in several short films accompanied by the Duke Ellington orchestra such as Symphony in Swing (1949) and Salute to Duke Ellington (1950).

Davis toured England with Ellington and Ray Nance in 1948, and in Europe with the Ellington orchestra in 1950. After leaving Ellington's orchestra in 1950, she married Edward Wimp in 1952. They had one son, Edward L. Wimp. Later, they settled in Apopka, Florida.

== Death ==
Davis died on January 27, 2012 at the age of 91.

== Discography ==
- I Ain't Got Nothing But The Blues (December 1, 1944) (live session at Carnegie Hall on December 19)
- I'm Beginning to See The Light (December 1, 1944) (live session at Carnegie Hall on December 19)
- Don't You Know I Care (Or Don't You Care to Know)? (December 1, 1944) (live session at Carnegie Hall on December 19)
- I Didn't Know About You (December 1, 1944) (live session at Carnegie Hall on December 19)
- Creole Love Call (December 19, 1944) (live session at Carnegie Hall)
- It Don't Mean a Thing (If It Ain't Got That Swing) (January 17, 1945) (with Marie Ellington and Joya Sherrill)
- Mood Indigo (April 14, 1945)
- If You Are But A Dream (April 26, 1945)
- Yesterdays (May 12, 1945)
- (In My) Solitude (May 15, 1945) (with Al Hibbler, Marie Ellington and Joya Sherrill)
- The More I See You (June 23, 1945)
- There's No You (June 30, 1945)
- Out of this World (August 11, 1945)
- If I Loved You (September 8, 1945)
- Dancing in the Dark (November 10, 1945)
- Transblucency (January 4, 1946)
- Embraceable You (March 28, 1946)
- The Blues (April 20, 1946)
- We'll Be Together Again (April 27, 1946)
- Full Moon and Empty Arms (May 18, 1946)
- Come Rain or Come Shine (June 1, 1946)
- Inbetween (June 3, 4, or 5, 1946)
- Brown Penny (June 3, 4, or 5, 1946)
- No One But You (June 3, 4, or 5, 1946)
- Ore From A Gold Mine (June 3, 4, or 5, 1946)
- Oh Polly (June 3, 4, or 5, 1946)
- Rooster and the Hen (June 3, 4, or 5, 1946)
- They Say It's Wonderful (June 8, 1946)
- Cynthia's in Love (August 17, 1946)
- Can't Help Lovin' That Man (October 5, 1946)
- Minnehaha (November 10, 1946)
- When I Walk With You (August 1, 1947)
- Put Yourself in my Place Baby (September 1, 1947)
- On A Torquoise Cloud (December 22, 1947)
- Don't Blame Me (November 6, 1948)
- Lush Life (November 13, 1948)
- He Makes Me Believe He's Mine (November 26, 1948)
- Lover Man (Oh Where Can You Be?) (November 27, 1948)
- Body and Soul (February 1949)
- On A Torquoise Cloud (February 16, 1949, sung in the short film Symphony in Swing)
- Frankie and Johnny (February 16, 1949, sung in the short film Symphony in Swing)
- Metronome All Out (February 16, 1949, sung in the short film Symphony in Swing)
- Violet Blue (March 6, 1950, sung in the short film Salute to Ellington)
