= Claude Jones =

American jazz musician (1901–1962)

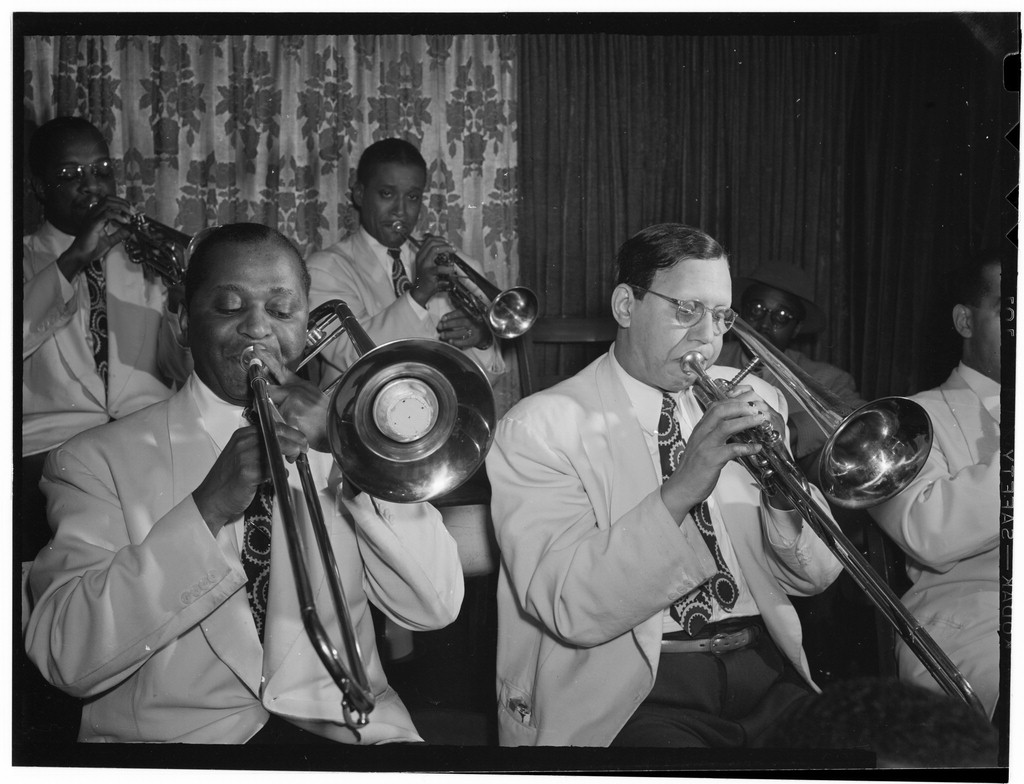
- Claude Jones (right) and Wilbur De Paris at the Aquarium in New York in 1946

Background information
- Born: February 11, 1901; Boley, Oklahoma, United States
- Died: January 17, 1962 (aged 60); Los Angeles, California, United States
- Genres: Swing jazz
- Occupation(s): Musician, sailor
- Instrument: Trombone
- Years active: 1922–62
- Formerly of: McKinney's Cotton Pickers

Claude Jones (February 11, 1901 – January 17, 1962) was an American jazz trombonist.

== Biography ==
Born in Boley, Oklahoma, United States, Jones began playing trombone at the age of 13, and studied at Wilberforce University before dropping out in 1922 to join the Synco Jazz Band. This group eventually evolved into McKinney's Cotton Pickers, where he would play intermittently until 1929.

From there, Jones played in a variety of noted swing jazz ensembles, including those of Fletcher Henderson (1929–31, 1933–34, 1941–42, 1950), Don Redman (1931–33, 1943), Alex Hill, Chick Webb, and Cab Calloway (1934–40, 1943). He recorded with Jelly Roll Morton in 1939 and Louis Armstrong/Sidney Bechet in 1940. In the 1940s, he also played with Coleman Hawkins, Zutty Singleton, Joe Sullivan, Benny Carter, and Duke Ellington (1944–48, 1951).

After completing his second stint with Ellington, Jones became a mess steward on the ship SS United States, and he died at sea in 1962.
