= Junior Raglin =

American jazz double bassist (1917–1955)

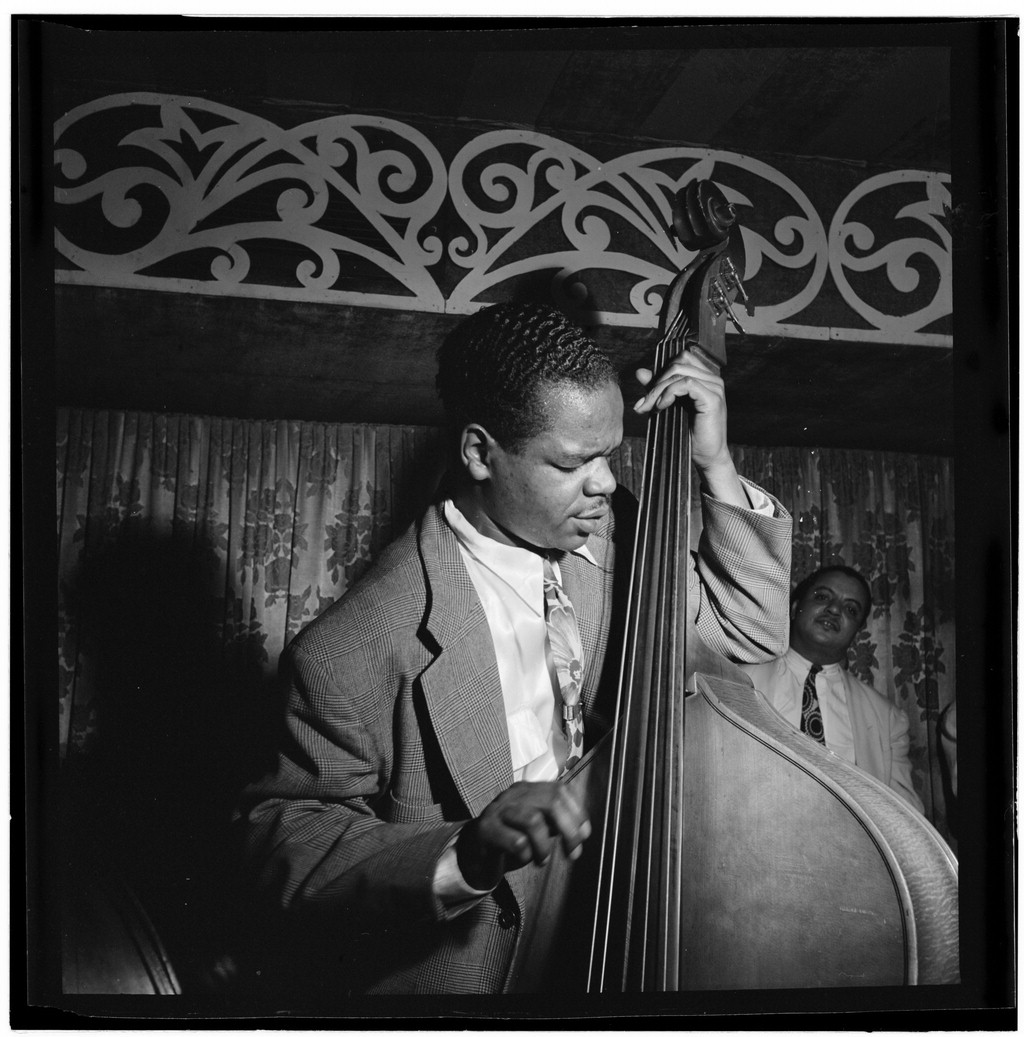
- Junior Raglin in 1946; by William P. Gottlieb

Background information
- Born: Alvin Raglin; March 16, 1917; Omaha, Nebraska, U.S.
- Died: November 10, 1955 (aged 38) Boston, Massachusetts, U.S.
- Genres: Jazz; swing
- Occupation: Musician
- Instrument: Double bass
- Years active: 1930s–1940s
- Formerly of: Duke Ellington

Alvin "Junior" Raglin (March 16, 1917, in Omaha, Nebraska – November 10, 1955, in Boston) was an American jazz and swing double bassist.

Raglin started out on guitar but had picked up bass by the mid-1930s. He played with Eugene Coy from 1938 to 1941, in Oregon, and then joined Duke Ellington's orchestra, where he replaced Jimmy Blanton. Raglin remained in Ellington's employ from 1941 to 1945. In 1942, he appears (uncredited) on Jam Session a short film by Josef Berne featuring Ellington band members.

After leaving Ellington's orchestra, Raglin led his own quartet and also played with Dave Rivera, Ella Fitzgerald, and Al Hibbler. He briefly returned to perform with Ellington in 1946 and 1955.

Raglin fell ill in the late 1940s and quit performing; he died in 1955, aged 38. He never recorded as a leader.
