= Fred Guy =

American jazz banjoist and guitarist (1897–1971)

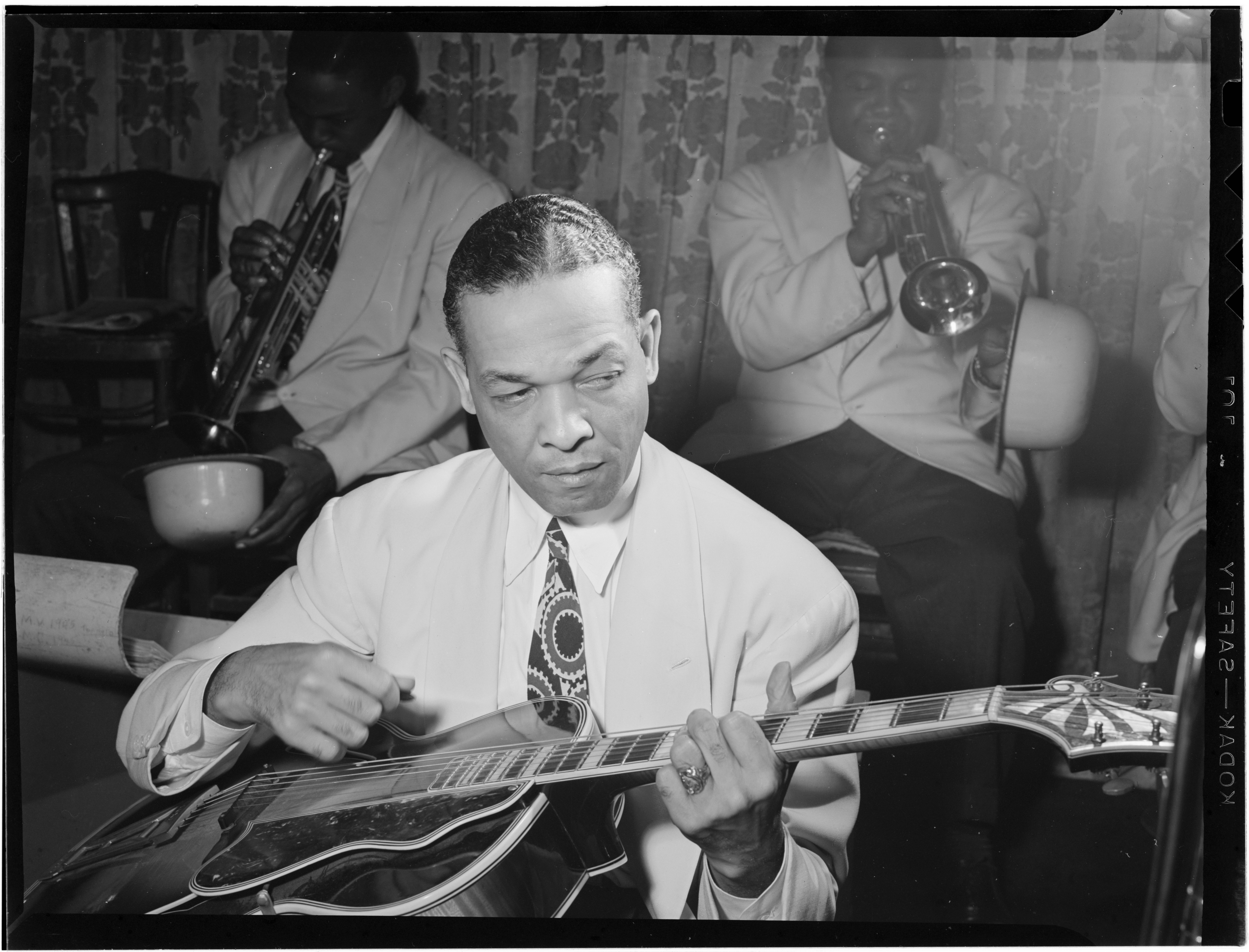
- New York City, c. November 1946

Background information
- Born: May 23, 1897; Burkeville, Virginia, U.S.
- Died: December 22, 1971 (aged 74) Chicago, Illinois
- Genres: Jazz, swing, big band
- Occupation: Musician
- Instruments: Guitar, banjo
- Years active: 1924–1949

Frederick L. Guy (May 23, 1897 – December 22, 1971) was an American jazz banjo player and guitarist.

Born in Burkeville, Virginia, Guy was raised in New York City. He played guitar and banjo with Joseph C. Smith's Orchestra. In the early 1920s, Guy joined Duke Ellington's Washingtonians, switching from banjo to guitar in the early 1930s. He remained with Ellington's orchestra until 1949. He retired, moved to Chicago, and for twenty years ran a ballroom. In 1971, he committed suicide.
