= Studio Sessions 1957 & 1962 =

1987 album by Duke Ellington

Studio album by Duke Ellington
- Released: 1987
- Recorded: January 17 & 29, 1957, February 1957, March 29, 1962, May 28, 1962, and June 6, 1962
- Genre: Jazz
- Label: LMR
- Producer: Duke Ellington

Duke Ellington chronology
Featuring Paul Gonsalves (1962)	Studio Sessions 1957 & 1962 (1987)	Midnight in Paris (1962)

Studio Sessions 1957 & 1962 is the seventh volume of The Private Collection a series documenting recordings made by American pianist, composer and bandleader Duke Ellington for his personal collection which was first released on the LMR label in 1987 and later on the Saja label.

== Reception ==
The AllMusic review by Scott Yanow awarded the album 4½ stars and stated "these sets allow one to hear Duke experimenting with his ensemble. Some selections were essentially works-in-progress that would develop within the next few years; others were quickly discarded originals or rearrangements of older tunes".

Professional ratings
Review scores
Source	Rating
AllMusic	4.5/5 stars

== Track listing ==
All compositions by Duke Ellington

1. "Things Ain't What They Used to Be" (Mercer Ellington) – 3:19
2. "Something Sexual" – 2:16
3. "The Riff" – 2:25
4. "Bluer" – 2:14
5. "Wailing 'Bout" – 2:48
6. "I Cover the Waterfront" (Johnny Green, Edward Heyman) – 3:27
7. "Blues a la Willie Cook" – 4:03
8. "Slow Blues Ensemble" – 3:13
9. "Circle of Fourths" (Ellington, Billy Strayhorn) – 2:12
10. "Perdido" (Juan Tizol) – 3:12
11. "Three Trumps" – 2:46
12. "Deep Blues" (Ellington, McAlpin, Rose) – 3:30
13. "Things Ain't What They Used to Be" (Mercer Ellington) – 6:51
14. "Paris Blues" – 2:49
15. "I Got It Bad (And That Ain't Good)" (Ellington, Paul Francis Webster) – 3:15
16. "Circle Blues" – 5:46
17. "Perdido" (Tizol) – 3:15
18. "The Sky Fell Down" – 4:30
19. "Cotton Tail" – 3:04
20. "Passion Flower" (Strayhorn) – 4:22

- Recorded at Universal Studios, Chicago, on January 17, 1957 (tracks 3–6), January 29, 1957 (tracks 7–12), February 1957 (tracks 1 & 2), at A&R Studio, New York, on March 29, 1962 (tracks 13–16), and at Bell Sound Studios, New York, on May 28, 1962 (tracks 17, 18 & 20), and June 6, 1962 (track 19).

== Personnel ==
- Duke Ellington – piano (tracks 1–12, 14 & 17–20)
- Billy Strayhorn – piano (tracks 13, 15 & 16)
- Ray Nance – cornet (tracks 13–20), trumpet (tracks 1, 3, 4, 7, 8 & 11)
- Cat Anderson (track 1 & 17–20), Bill Berry (track 14 & 17–20), Roy Burrowes (track 14 & 17–20), Willie Cook (tracks 1, 3, 4, 7, 8 & 11), Eddie Mullens (track 14), Clark Terry (tracks 1, 3, 4 & 8–11) – trumpet
- Lawrence Brown (track 13–20), Leon Cox (track 14 & 17–20), Quentin Jackson (track 1), Britt Woodman (track 1) – trombone
- John Sanders – valve trombone (track 1)
- Chuck Connors – bass trombone (track 14 & 17–20)
- Jimmy Hamilton – clarinet, tenor saxophone (track 1, 14 & 17–20)
- Russell Procope – alto saxophone, clarinet (track 1, 14 & 17–20)
- Johnny Hodges – alto saxophone (tracks 1, 2, 13–20)
- Paul Gonsalves – tenor saxophone
- Harry Carney – baritone saxophone (track 1 & 13–20)
- Aaron Bell (track 13–20), Jimmy Woode (tracks 1–12) – bass
- Sonny Greer (track 14), Sam Woodyard (tracks 1–13, 15–20) – drums
- Unidentified choir (track 2)
