= The Great Paris Concert =

1973 album by Duke Ellington

Live album by Duke Ellington
- Released: 1973
- Recorded: February 1–23, 1963
- Genre: Jazz
- Length: 118:34
- Label: Atlantic
- Producer: (Reissue) Ilhan Mimaroglu, Bob Porter

Duke Ellington chronology
Afro-Bossa (1963)	The Great Paris Concert (1973)	The Symphonic Ellington (1963)

Professional ratings
Review scores
Source	Rating
Allmusic	link
The Rolling Stone Jazz Record Guide	3/5 stars

The Great Paris Concert is a 1973 live double album by jazz pianist Duke Ellington preserving pieces of a series of performances given in Paris during February 1963, a decade prior the release. For the 1989 CD reissue, 10 additional recordings from the same series of Paris concerts were added to the release. These 10 performances had previously been released on the 1967 LP Duke Ellington's Greatest Hits: Recorded "Live" In Concert (Reprise RS-6234).

== Track listing ==
All tracks written by Duke Ellington unless otherwise noted. All tracks live.

1. "Kinda Dukish" – 1:52
2. "Rockin' in Rhythm" (Harry Carney, Ellington, Irving Mills) – 3:47
3. "On the Sunny Side of the Street" (Dorothy Fields, Jimmy McHugh) – 2:58
4. "The Star-Crossed Lovers" (Ellington, Billy Strayhorn) – 4:18
5. "All of Me" (Gerald Marks, Seymour Simons) – 2:35
6. "Theme from the Asphalt Jungle" – 4:08
7. "Concerto for Cootie" – 2:31
8. "Tutti for Cootie" (Ellington, Jimmy Hamilton) – 4:46
9. "Suite Thursday: Misfit Blues" (Ellington, Strayhorn) – 3:39
10. "Suite Thursday: Schwiphti" (Ellington, Strayhorn) – 2:50
11. "Suite Thursday: Zweet Zurzday" (Ellington, Strayhorn) – 3:55
12. "Suite Thursday: Lay-By" (Ellington, Strayhorn) – 6:25
13. "Perdido" (Ervin Drake, H.J. Lengsfelder, Juan Tizol) – 5:22
14. "The Eighth Veil" (Ellington, Strayhorn) – 2:33
15. "Rose of the Rio Grande" (Ross Gorman, Edgar Leslie, Harry Warren) – 2:41
16. "Cop Out" – 6:58
17. "Bula" – 4:42
18. "Jam With Sam" – 3:51
19. "Happy Go Lucky Local" – 3:25
20. "Tone Parallel to Harlem" – 14:05

=== Additional tracks on 1989 re-release ===
21. "Don't Get Around Much Anymore" (Ellington, Bob Russell) – 2:33
22. "Do Nothin' Till You Hear From Me" (Ellington, Russell) – 4:33
23. "Black and Tan Fantasy" (Ellington, Bubber Miley) – 2:43
24. "Creole Love Call" – 2:08
25. "The Mooche" – 5:38
26. "Things Ain't What They Used to Be" (Mercer Ellington, Ted Persons) – 2:53
27. "Pyramid" (Ellington, Irving Gordon, Mills, Tizol) – 3:25
28. "The Blues" – 3:36
29. "Echoes of Harlem" – 3:32
30. "Satin Doll" – (Ellington, Mercer, Strayhorn) – 2:27

== Personnel ==
- Cat Anderson – trumpet
- Lawrence Brown – trombone
- Roy Burrowes – trumpet
- Harry Carney – clarinet, baritone saxophone
- Chuck Connors – trombone
- Buster Cooper – trombone
- Duke Ellington – piano
- Paul Gonsalves – tenor saxophone
- Milt Grayson – vocals
- Jimmy Hamilton – clarinet, tenor saxophone
- Johnny Hodges – alto saxophone
- Ray Nance – violin, cornet
- Russell Procope – clarinet, alto saxophone
- Ernie Shepard – bass
- Cootie Williams – trumpet
- Sam Woodyard – drums
- Stanley Dance – liner notes
- Ilhan Mimaroglu – reissue producer, production coordination, editing, sequencing, original collating
- Giuseppe Pino – liner notes, photography
- Popsie – liner notes
- Bob Porter – reissue producer
- Fred Seligo – liner notes
