= Recollections of the Big Band Era =

1974 album by Duke Ellington

Studio album by Duke Ellington
- Released: 1974
- Recorded: November 29, 1962, December 11, 13, 14, 20 & 29, 1962 & January 3 & 4, 1963
- Studio: Universal Recording Corp. (Chicago)
- Genre: Jazz
- Length: 74:18 (CD reissue)
- Label: Atlantic (recorded by Reprise)

Duke Ellington chronology
Will Big Bands Ever Come Back? (1963)	Recollections of the Big Band Era (1974)	Afro-Bossa (1963)

Recollections of the Big Band Era is an album by American pianist, composer and bandleader Duke Ellington recorded in 1962 and 1963 by Bruce Swedien at Universal Recording Corporation in Chicago for the Reprise label but not released until 1974 on the Atlantic label. The album features performances of compositions associated with big bands led by artists such as Count Basie, Fletcher Henderson, Louis Armstrong, Cab Calloway and others by the Duke Ellington's Orchestra. The 1989 CD reissue included 11 bonus tracks that originally appeared on Will Big Bands Ever Come Back? which was released on Reprise in 1965.

== Reception ==
The AllMusic review by Bruce Eder awarded the album 3 stars and stated: "The material is done in a smooth, swinging style, more laid-back than what the Count Basie orchestra of the same period would have done with this same stuff but with enough fire and boundless elegance to make it more than worthwhile... this is sort of a concept album, and a rather good one at that".

Professional ratings
Review scores
Source	Rating
AllMusic	3/5 stars
The Penguin Guide to Jazz Recordings	3/4 stars

== Track listing ==
1. "Minnie the Moocher" (Cab Calloway, Clarence Gaskill, Irving Mills) - 2:47
2. "For Dancers Only" (Sy Oliver, Don Raye, Vic Schoen) - 3:04
3. "It's a Lonesome Old Town (When You're Not Around)" (Charles Kisco, Harry Tobias) - 2:20
4. "Cherokee" (Ray Noble) - 2:54
5. "The Midnight Sun Will Never Set" (Dorcas Cochran, Quincy Jones, Henri Salvador) - 3:06
6. "Let's Get Together" (Chick Webb) - 2:40
7. "I'm Getting Sentimental Over You" (George Bassman, Ned Washington) - 3:25
8. "Chant of the Weed" (Don Redman) - 3:26
9. "Ciribiribin" (Alberto Pestalozza) - 3:28
10. "Contrasts" (Jimmy Dorsey) - 2:45
11. "Christopher Columbus" (Chu Berry, Andy Razaf) - 3:05
12. "Auld Lang Syne" (Robert Burns, Traditional) - 2:19
13. "Tuxedo Junction" (Erskine Hawkins, Bill Johnson, Buddy Feyne) - 3:27 Bonus track on CD reissue
14. "Smoke Rings" (Gene Gifford, Ned Washington) - 2:51 Bonus track on CD reissue
15. "Artistry in Rhythm" (Stan Kenton) - 3:17 Bonus track on CD reissue
16. "The Waltz You Saved for Me" (Gus Kahn, Wayne King) - 2:27 Bonus track on CD reissue
17. "Woodchopper's Ball" (Joey Bishop, Woody Herman) - 3:15 Bonus track on CD reissue
18. "Sentimental Journey" (Les Brown, Bud Green, Ben Homer) - 2:29 Bonus track on CD reissue
19. "When It's Sleepy Time Down South" (Clarence Muse, Leon René, Otis René) - 3:17 Bonus track on CD reissue
20. "One O'Clock Jump" (Count Basie) - 7:20 Bonus track on CD reissue
21. "Goodbye" (Gordon Jenkins) - 3:04 Bonus track on CD reissue
22. "Sleep, Sleep, Sleep" (Earl Lebieg) - 2:45 Bonus track on CD reissue
23. "Rhapsody in Blue" (George Gershwin) - 4:47 Bonus track on CD reissue

- Recorded at Universal Recording Studio by Bruce Swedien November 29, 1962 (tracks 6–8, 11, 20 & 21), December 11, 1962 (tracks 3, 9 & 13), December 13, 1962 (tracks 1 & 18), December 14, 1962 (tracks 2 & 19), December 20, 1962 (tracks 10, 22 & 23), December 29, 1962 (track 12), January 3, 1962 (tracks 5, 15 & 17), and January 4, 1963 (tracks 4, 14 & 16).

== Personnel ==
- Duke Ellington – piano
- Ray Nance – cornet, violin on track 17
- Cat Anderson, Roy Burrowes, Cootie Williams – trumpet
- Lawrence Brown, Buster Cooper – trombone
- Chuck Connors – bass trombone
- Jimmy Hamilton – clarinet, tenor saxophone
- Johnny Hodges – alto saxophone
- Russell Procope – alto saxophone, clarinet
- Paul Gonsalves – tenor saxophone
- Harry Carney – baritone saxophone, clarinet, bass clarinet
- Ernie Shepard – bass
- Sam Woodyard – drums
