= Butch Ballard =

American jazz drummer (1918–2011)

- Born: George Edward Ballard; December 26, 1918; Camden, New Jersey, U.S.
- Died: October 1, 2011 (aged 92) Philadelphia, Pennsylvania
- Genres: Jazz
- Occupation: Musician
- Instrument: Drums
- Years active: 1938–2011
- Formerly of: Count Basie Orchestra; Duke Ellington

George Edward "Butch" Ballard (December 26, 1918 – October 1, 2011) was an American jazz drummer who played with Louis Armstrong, Count Basie, and Duke Ellington.

== Biography ==
Ballard was born in Camden, New Jersey and grew up in the Frankford section of Philadelphia. As a child, he followed American Legion parades near his home, focusing particularly on the drummer. When he was about 10 years old, Ballard's father bought him a set of drums from a pawnbroker and he began to take lessons for 75 cents each. He got the nickname "Butch" after Machine Gun Butch, a character in the film The Big House (1930). He attended Northeast High School in Philadelphia. When he was 21, he married Jessie, for whom he bought a house in Philadelphia in 1950.

== Career ==
At around 16 years old, Ballard listened to Herb Thornton's band at the Boys Club in Philadelphia. They let him play with them, and he was invited to join a band by a man who heard him. For the following few months, he carried his drums across Philadelphia to rehearse. In 1938, Ballard began playing with Louis Armstrong's band The Dukes. He performed with them for a few years. In 1941, he began playing with the Cootie Williams Orchestra, performing with Ella Fitzgerald, Sarah Vaughan, Dinah Washington, and Pearl Bailey.

During World War II, Ballard joined the United States Navy and served in the 29th Special Construction Battalion in Guam and the South Pacific. While serving, he played in the military band. After the war, he returned to Philadelphia and then went to New York City, working with musicians including Eddie "Lockjaw" Davis, Eddie Vinson, Arnett Cobb, and Clark Terry.

He met and became friends with drummer Shadow Wilson who played with the Count Basie Orchestra. In the late 1940s, Wilson left Basie's orchestra to join Woody Herman's band and Basie invited Ballard to California replace him.

In 1950, Ballard received a telephone call from Duke Ellington who had heard of Ballard from his son Mercer. Ellington invited him to join his band on a European tour and Ballard sailed to France. Regular Ellington drummer Sonny Greer was proving to be increasingly unreliable due to his drinking, and Ellington hired Ballard as a backup. He played with musicians including Harry Carney, Paul Gonsalves, Jimmy Hamilton, Billy Strayhorn, Kay Davis and Chubby Kemp and Wendell Marshall. After the tour, Ellington asked him to permanently replace Greer, but Ballard declined, not wanting to change his drumming method to suit Ellington. Ellington, wanting a drummer who used double bass drums, hired Louie Bellson instead. Ballard continued to play with Ellington in 1952–1953 and made recordings with him, such as "Satin Doll."

In the 1960s, Ballard began leading his own band in Philadelphia. Ballard played with many musicians during his career, including John Coltrane, Freddie Green, Harry "Sweets" Edison, Clark Terry, Emmett "Rev" Berry, Bardu Ali, Willie Cook, Cat Anderson, Arnett Cobb, Lucky Millinder, Bootsie Barnes, Bob Dorsey, Eddy Vincent and Mercer Ellington.

Ballard became a music teacher in the mid-1980s and saw about 12 students a week. In his later years, he also played with the Philadelphia Legends of Jazz Orchestra.

== Awards and honors ==
On December 1, 2006, Ballard received the Mellon Jazz Community Award for his musical career and his continued education of young jazz musicians.

== Discography ==
=== As sideman ===
- Eddie "Lockjaw" Davis, Count Basie Presents Eddie Davis Trio + Joe Newman (Roulette, 1958)
- Duke Ellington, Ellington '55 (Capitol, 1954)
- Duke Ellington, Ellington Showcase (Capitol, 1955)
- Johnny Hodges, A Memory of Johnny Hodges (Master Jazz, 1970)
- Johnny Hodges, Ellingtonia! (Onyx, 1974)
- Lee Lovett, Lee + 3 (Wynne, 1959)
- Lee Lovett, Misty (Strand, 1962)
- Clark Terry, Squeeze Me! (Chiaroscuro, 1989)
