= Used to Be Duke =

Studio album by Johnny Hodges
- Released: October 1956
- Recorded: July 2 and August 5, 1954
- Genre: Jazz
- Length: 38:21
- Label: Norgran - MGM 1060
- Producer: Norman Granz

Johnny Hodges chronology
In a Tender Mood (1955)	Used to Be Duke (1956)	The Blues (1956)

Used to Be Duke is a studio album by Johnny Hodges, accompanied by members of Duke Ellington's orchestra, released by Norgran Records in October 1956.

== Reception ==
Professional ratings
Review scores
Source	Rating
AllMusic	4/5 stars

Scott Yanow on AllMusic gave the album four stars out of five, commenting "Hodges had a particularly strong group. High points include 'On the Sunny Side of the Street', the title track and a seven-song ballad medley."

== Track listing ==
1. "Used to Be Duke" (Johnny Hodges) - 7:24
2. "On the Sunny Side of the Street" (Dorothy Fields, Jimmy McHugh) - 2:59
3. "Sweet as Bear Meat" (Hodges) - 3:22
4. "Madam Butterfly" (Jimmy Hamilton, Hodges) - 3:17
5. "Warm Valley" (Duke Ellington) - 3:24
6. Ballad medley: "Autumn In New York"/"Sweet Lorraine"/"Time On My Hands"/"Smoke Gets in Your Eyes"/"If You Were Mine"/"Poor Butterfly" (Vernon Duke)/(Cliff Burwell, Mitchell Parish)/(Vincent Youmans, Harold Adamson, Mack Gordon)/(Jerome Kern, Otto Harbach)/(Matty Malneck, Johnny Mercer)/(Raymond Hubbell, John Golden) - 17:55
7. Burgundy Walk* - Additional track not on LP
8. Skokiaan* - Additional track not on LP

Recorded in Los Angeles, July 2 (tracks 2, 3, 7) and August 5 (tracks 1, 4–6, 8), 1954.

The ballad medley on the Spotify release and some vinyl copies has been printed wrong, mixing up some tunes and excluding "All of Me" which is titled as "Poor Butterfly" on the Spotify release. The correct list is as follows:

"Autumn in New York", "Sweet Loraine", "Smoke Gets in Your Eyes", "If You Were Mine", "Poor Butterfly", "All Of Me"

== Personnel ==
- Johnny Hodges - alto saxophone
- Shorty Baker - trumpet
- Lawrence Brown - trombone
- Jimmy Hamilton - clarinet, tenor saxophone (tracks 1, 6)
- John Coltrane - tenor saxophone (tracks 1–3, 7)
- Harry Carney - baritone saxophone
- Call Cobbs Jr. (tracks 1–5), Richie Powell (track 6) - piano
- John "Buddy" Williams - double bass
- Louie Bellson - drums
