= Castle Rock (album) =

Studio album by Johnny Hodges and His Orchestra
- Released: 1955
- Recorded: January 15, February 28, March 3, 1951 and January 13, 1952; New York City
- Genre: Jazz
- Length: 36:10
- Label: Norgran MGN 1048
- Producer: Norman Granz

Johnny Hodges chronology
Caravan (1947-51)	Castle Rock (1955)	In a Tender Mood (1952)

Castle Rock is an album recorded by American jazz saxophonist Johnny Hodges featuring performances recorded in 1951 and 1952 and released on the Norgran label.

== Reception ==
Professional ratings
Review scores
Source	Rating
AllMusic	3/5 stars

AllMusic awarded the album 3 stars out of 5 and noted "Hodges was evidently trying to make somewhat of a break from his established sound with this recording, though the results are mixed. It's still worth acquiring, though there are a number of better recordings available under Hodges' name".

== Track listing ==
All compositions by Johnny Hodges, except as indicated.

1. "Castle Rock" (Al Sears) - 2:40
2. "The Jeep Is Jumpin'" (Duke Ellington, Johnny Hodges) - 2:45
3. "A Gentle Breeze" (Sears) - 3:10
4. "Globe Trotter" - 3:05
5. "Jeep's Blues" (Ellington, Hodges) - 2:55
6. "A Pound of Blues" (Leroy Lovett) - 3:05
7. "You Blew Out the Flame in My Heart" - 3:20
8. "Something to Pat Your Foot To" (Sears) - 2:50
9. "Blue Fantasia" - 3:10
10. "My Reward" (Ellington) - 3:10
11. "Sideways" (Lovett) - 3:00
12. "Wham" - 3:00
- Recorded in New York City on January 15, 1951 (tracks 7–10), January 15, 1951 (tracks 2 & 5), March 3, 1951 (tracks 1, 3 & 4) and January 13, 1952 (tracks 6, 11 & 12).

== Personnel ==
- Johnny Hodges - alto saxophone
- Emmett Berry, (tracks 1–6, 11 & 12), Nelson Williams (tracks 7–10) - trumpet
- Lawrence Brown - trombone
- Al Sears - tenor saxophone
- Leroy Lovett (tracks 1–3 & 5–12), Billy Strayhorn (track 4) - piano
- Al McKibbon (tracks 7–10), Lloyd Trotman (tracks 1–6, 11 & 12) - bass
- Sonny Greer (tracks 1–5 & 7–10), Joe Marshall (tracks 6, 11 & 12) - drums
