= Featuring Paul Gonsalves =

1985 album by Duke Ellington

Studio album by Duke Ellington
- Released: 1985
- Recorded: May 1, 1962
- Genre: Jazz
- Label: Fantasy

Featuring Paul Gonsalves is an album by American jazz pianist, composer, and bandleader Duke Ellington. Without new material to work with, Ellington recorded the album with his orchestra and saxophonist Paul Gonsalves in 1962 during a four-hour recording session. It was not released until 1985 by Fantasy Records.

== Critical reception ==
Professional ratings
Review scores
Source	Rating
The Penguin Guide to Jazz Recordings	3.5/4 stars

Writing for Playboy, Robert Christgau noted that while his own tastes in jazz ran to bebop rather than Ellington's big band, Gonsalves' performance highly impressed him: "It goes without saying that Gonsalves shows more sonic and harmonic imagination than such R&B contemporaries (and heroes of my youth) as Lee Allen and Sam 'The Man' Taylor. The beauty is that he's not above outhonking them as well." The AllMusic review by Stephen Cook stated, "Gonsalves turns this one-off session into one of the more enjoyable titles in Ellington's catalog".

== Track listing ==
All compositions by Duke Ellington except as indicated.

1. "C Jam Blues" (Barney Bigard, Ellington) – 5:14
2. "Take the "A" Train" (Billy Strayhorn) – 5:43
3. "Happy Go Lucky Local" – 5:03
4. "Jam With Sam" – 3:18
5. "Caravan" (Ellington, Irving Mills, Juan Tizol) – 6:12
6. "Just A-Sittin' and A-Rockin'" (Ellington, Lee Gaines, Strayhorn) – 4:49
7. "Paris Blues" – 3:30
8. "Ready, Go!" (Ellington, Strayhorn) – 5:01
- Recorded at A & R Studio, New York, on May 1, 1962

== Personnel ==
- Duke Ellington – piano
- Ray Nance – cornet
- Cat Anderson, Bill Berry, Roy Burrowes – trumpet
- Lawrence Brown, Leon Cox – trombone
- Chuck Connors – bass trombone
- Jimmy Hamilton – clarinet, tenor saxophone
- Johnny Hodges, Russell Procope – alto saxophone
- Paul Gonsalves – tenor saxophone
- Harry Carney – baritone saxophone
- Aaron Bell – bass
- Sam Woodyard – drums
