= Joe Marshall (musician) =

American drummer

- Born: December 7, 1913; Pensacola, Florida, US
- Died: June 1, 1992 (aged 78); Teaneck, New Jersey
- Genres: Jazz
- Occupation: Musician
- Instrument: Drums

Joseph Marshall Jr. (December 7, 1913 – June 1, 1992) was an American jazz drummer.

== Early life ==
Marshall was born in Pensacola, Florida, on December 7, 1913. He was brought up in Chicago, and as musical educators had his mother, who played the piano, and high-school band teachers Nathaniel Clark Smith and Walter Dyett.

== Later life and career ==
In the early 1940s he played with Milt Larkin's band, as well as with the Duke Ellington and Jimmie Lunceford orchestras.

In 1952, Marshall played with a New York-based quintet led by Ben Webster, with Harold Baker, Cyril Hines, and Bill Pemberton. In 1960 he appeared on Al Sears' Swing's the Thing, with Don Abney, Wally Richardson and Wendell Marshall. Marshall continued to record until at least 1989. He died in Teaneck, New Jersey, on June 1, 1992.

Marshall is cited by Bernard Purdie as one of his influences.

== Discography ==
- 1952: Castle Rock, In a Tender Mood - Johnny Hodges
- 1957: Ruth Brown - Ruth Brown (Atlantic)
- 1958: La Vern Baker Sings Bessie Smith - LaVern Baker (Atlantic)
- 1959: Miss Rhythm - Ruth Brown (Atlantic)
- 1960: Swing's the Thing - Al Sears (Swingville)
- 1966: Stride Right - Johnny Hodges and Earl Hines (Verve)
- 1966: Blue Pyramid Johnny Hodges and Wild Bill Davis (Verve)
- 1968: Livin' the Blues - Jimmy Rushing (BluesWay)
- 1969: Little Green Apples, Come Hither - Sonny Stitt (Solid State)
- 1978: Ain't Misbehavin' - Original cast recording (RCA)
