= The Symphonic Ellington =

1964 album by Duke Ellington

Studio album by Duke Ellington
- Released: 1964
- Recorded: January 31, February 8, 14, 21, 1963
- Genre: Jazz
- Label: Reprise

Duke Ellington chronology
The Great Paris Concert (1963)	The Symphonic Ellington (1964)	Duke Ellington's Jazz Violin Session (1963)

The Symphonic Ellington is an album by American pianist, composer and bandleader Duke Ellington, recorded and released on the Reprise label in 1963. The album features recordings of Ellington's orchestra with the Paris Symphony Orchestra, the Stockholm Symphony Orchestra, the Hamburg Symphony Orchestra, and the La Scala Symphony Orchestra.

== Reception ==
The AllMusic review by Scott Yanow stated: "With most of his all-star soloists heard from in this program and a complete avoidance of trying to make his music sound so-called 'respectable' or self-consciously third stream, Ellington's arrangements keep the strings from weighing down the proceedings and the music is actually quite successful".

Professional ratings
Review scores
Source	Rating
AllMusic	3/5 stars
Record Mirror	5/5 stars

== Track listing ==
All music is composed by Duke Ellington.

No.	Title	Length
1.	"Night Creature 1st Movement: Blind Bug"	4:10
2.	"Night Creature 2nd Movement: Stalking Monster"	7:51
3.	"Night Creature 3rd Movement: Dazzling Creature"	4:01
4.	"Non-Violent Integration"	5:27
5.	"La Scala, She Too Pretty to Be Blue"	6:14
6.	"Harlem"	14:03

- Recorded at Salle Wagram, Paris, on January 31, 1963 (tracks 3 & 6), at Solna-Sundbyberg, Sweden, on February 8, 1963 (tracks 1 & 2), at Hamburg, Germany, on February 14, 1963 (track 4), and at Studio Zanibelli, Milan, Italy, on February 21, 1963 (track 5).

== Personnel ==
- Duke Ellington – piano
- Ray Nance – cornet
- Cat Anderson, Roy Burrowes, Cootie Williams – trumpet
- Lawrence Brown, Buster Cooper – trombone
- Chuck Connors – bass trombone
- Jimmy Hamilton – clarinet, tenor saxophone
- Johnny Hodges – alto saxophone
- Russell Procope – alto saxophone, clarinet
- Paul Gonsalves – tenor saxophone
- Harry Carney – baritone saxophone, clarinet, bass clarinet
- Ernie Shepard – bass
- Sam Woodyard – drums
- The Paris Symphony Orchestra (tracks 3 & 6)
- The Stockholm Symphony Orchestra (tracks 1 & 2)
- The Hamburg Symphony Orchestra (track 4)
- The La Scala Symphony Orchestra (track 5)
