= In a Tender Mood =

Studio album by Johnny Hodges and His Orchestra
- Released: 1955
- Recorded: January 15, February 28, March 3, 1951, and January 13, 1952; New York City and San Francisco, CA
- Genre: Jazz
- Length: 36:10
- Label: Norgran MGN 1059
- Producer: Norman Granz

Johnny Hodges chronology
Castle Rock (1951–52)	In a Tender Mood (1955)	The Blues (1952–54)

In a Tender Mood is an album recorded by American jazz saxophonist Johnny Hodges featuring performances recorded in 1951 and 1952 and released on the Norgran label.

== Track listing ==
All compositions by Johnny Hodges except as indicated

1. "Who's Excited" (Johnny Hodges, Mercer Ellington) - 3:05
2. "Standing Room Only" - 2:48
3. "What's I'm Gotchere" (Edith Cue) - 3:56
4. "Sweet Georgia Brown" (Ben Bernie, Maceo Pinkard, Kenneth Casey) - 6:01
5. "Duke's Blues" - 6:08
6. "Tenderly" (Walter Gross, Jack Lawrence) - 3:21
7. "Tea for Two" (Vincent Youmans, Irving Caesar) - 3:00
8. "Nothin' Yet" (Emmett Berry) - 2:42
- Recorded in New York City on January 13, 1952 (track 1) and January 17, 1952 (track 2), and in San Francisco, CA on March 25, 1952 (tracks 4–7) and July 17, 1952 (tracks 3 & 8).

== Personnel ==
- Johnny Hodges - alto saxophone
- Emmett Berry - trumpet
- Lawrence Brown - trombone
- Flip Phillips (tracks 3 & 8), Al Sears (tracks 1, 2 & 4–7) - tenor saxophone
- Leroy Lovett - piano
- Red Callender (tracks 3 & 8), Barney Richmond (tracks 4–7), Lloyd Trotman (tracks 1 & 2) - bass
- J. C. Heard (tracks 3 & 8), Joe Marshall (tracks 1, 2 & 4–7) - drums
