= The Blues (Johnny Hodges album) =

Studio album by Johnny Hodges and His Orchestra
- Released: October 1956
- Recorded: July 22, 1952, December 11, 1952, September 17, 1953 and July 2, 1954; San Francisco, CA, New York City and Radio Recorders, Los Angeles, CA
- Genre: Jazz
- Label: Norgran MGN 1061
- Producer: Norman Granz

Johnny Hodges chronology
Used to Be Duke (1956)	The Blues (1956)	Dance Bash

The Blues is an album by American jazz saxophonist Johnny Hodges released on the Norgran label in October 1956. It features performances recorded in 1952, 1953 and 1954.

== Reception ==
Professional ratings
Review scores
Source	Rating
AllMusic	3/5 stars

The AllMusic site awarded the album 3 stars out of 5.

== Track listing ==
All compositions by Johnny Hodges, except as indicated

1. "Rosanne" (Glenn Osser, Edna Osser, Dick Manning) - 3:06
2. "Hodge-Podge" (Johnny Hodges, Duke Ellington) - 3:33
3. "Jappa" - 3:49
4. "Through for the Night" (Trummy Young) - 3:14
5. "The Sheik of Araby" (Ted Snyder, Harry B. Smith, Francis Wheeler) - 3:12
6. "Latino" - 2:57
7. "Johnny's Blues" (Edith Cue Hodges) - 7:00
8. "Indiana" (Ballard MacDonald, James F. Hanley) - 3:48
9. "Easy Going Bounce" (Leroy Lovett) - 3:30
10. "Burgundy Walk" - 7:05
- Recorded in Los Angeles, CA on July 22, 1952 (tracks 1–3) in New York City on December 11, 1952 (tracks 4–6) and September 17, 1953 (tracks 7–9) and at Radio Recorders in Los Angeles, CA on July 2, 1954 (track 10)

== Personnel ==
- Johnny Hodges - alto saxophone
- Emmett Berry, (tracks 1–9), Shorty Baker (track 10) - trumpet
- Lawrence Brown - trombone
- Arthur Clarke (tracks 7–9), John Coltrane (track 10), Ben Webster (tracks 1–6), Rudy Williams (tracks 4–6) - tenor saxophone
- Ted Brannon (tracks 4–6), Call Cobbs (track 10), Leroy Lovett (tracks 1-3 & 7–9) - piano
- Ray Brown (tracks 7–9), Red Callender (tracks 1–3), Barney Richmond (tracks 4–6), John Williams (track 10) - bass
- Louis Bellson (track 10), J. C. Heard (tracks 1-3 & 7–9), Al Walker (tracks 4–6) - drums
