= Nelson Williams (trumpeter) =

American jazz trumpeter (1917–1973)

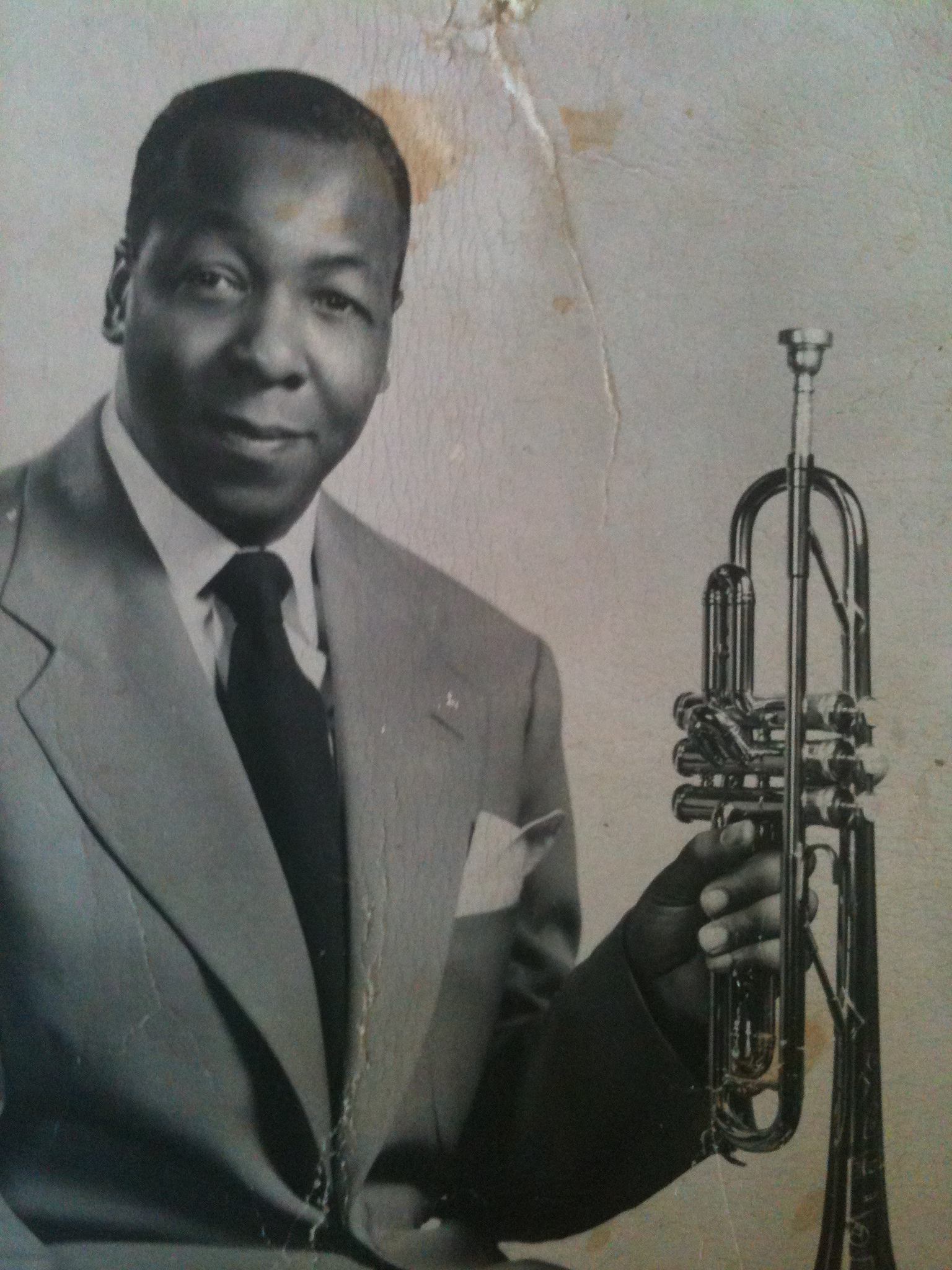
- Williams, in an undated photo

Background information
- Born: September 26, 1917 (age 109); Montgomery, Alabama, U.S.
- Died: Voorburg, South Holland, Netherlands
- Genre: Jazz
- Occupation: Musician
- Instrument: Trumpet
- Labels: Philips; CBS; MPS; BMG
- Formerly of: Tiny Bradshaw; Billy Eckstine; Duke Ellington

Nelson "Cadillac" Williams (September 26, 1917, Montgomery, Alabama – 1973, Voorburg, Netherlands) was an American jazz trumpeter.

Williams began playing the piano at age 13 but settled on the trumpet soon afterwards; he may have played with the blues pianist and singer Cow Cow Davenport while still a teenager. In the 1930s, he played in the territory bands Trianon Crackerjacks and Brown Skin Models and acted as musical director for the Dixie Rhythm Girls. Around 1940, he left Alabama for Philadelphia, where he played with Tiny Bradshaw's band before joining the U.S. Army during World War II.

After the war, Billy Eckstine hired Williams, and following this, he worked with John Kirby and pianist Billy Kyle. In 1949, he began the first of several stints with Duke Ellington, who bestowed upon him the nickname "Cadillac". In 1951, he left Ellington's employ and moved to Paris, where he led his own bands and recorded for French labels. He returned to Ellington in 1956 and played with him again in 1969 on a tour of Europe.

He settled in the Netherlands, and died in 1973.

== Discography ==
=== As leader ===
- Just Swinging (Philips, 1959)
- Rhythm Is My Business (CBS, 1967)
- The Great Traditionalists in Europe (MPS, 1969)
- Five Horn Groove & All Stars (BMG, 2005)

=== As sideman ===
With Duke Ellington

- Masterpieces by Ellington (Columbia, 1951)
- The World of Duke Ellington, Volume 2 (Columbia, 1975)
- The World of Duke Ellington, Volume 3 (Columbia, 1976)
- West Coast Tour (Jazz Bird, 1980)
- Paris Jazz Party (Affinity, 1981)
- Never-Before-Released, 1965–1972 (MusicMasters, 1991)

With others

- Dutch Swing College Band, Big City Blues (Philips, 1962)
- Johnny Hodges, Castle Rock (Norgran, 1955)
- Cootie Williams, Cootie (Decca, 1959)
- Mary Lou Williams, I Made You Love Paris (Gitanes, 2000)
