= Dickie Thompson =

American songwriter

- Birth name: James Edward Thompson
- Born: December 13, 1917; Jersey City, New Jersey, United States
- Died: February 22, 2007 (aged 89); Tucson, Arizona, United States
- Genres: Jazz, R&B
- Occupation(s): Singer, guitarist, songwriter
- Instrument(s): Vocals, guitar
- Years active: 1940s-2000s
- Labels: Herald, Winley

James Edward "Dickie" Thompson (December 13, 1917 – February 22, 2007) was an American jazz and R&B guitarist, singer and songwriter.

== Biography ==
Born in Jersey City, New Jersey, he took up the guitar in his teens, playing it left-handed and upside down and pioneering a technique of string bending. By the 1940s, he was well known for his performances in New York City jazz clubs, and started playing as a session musician.

He began recording under his own name in the early 1950s. In early 1954, he wrote and recorded his song "Thirteen Women and One Man", released on Herald Records, and featuring guitarist Mickey Baker. With slightly risqué lyrics, the record was not a hit, but it was heard by record producer Milt Gabler. He produced a version, with slightly altered words referencing the H-bomb but still crediting authorship to Thompson, that was recorded by Bill Haley and the Comets in April that year, and issued as "Thirteen Women (And Only One Man In Town)". Haley's record was only a modest success, until what was originally its B-side, "Rock Around the Clock", became a worldwide hit in 1955. As a result, Thompson continued to receive royalty payments for the rest of his life.

Thompson later toured with R&B singer Jackie Wilson, and recorded with Hammond organist Wild Bill Davis and saxophonist Johnny Hodges. In the 1970s he moved to Hawaii, where he performed with Don Ho. He moved to Tucson, Arizona in the 1990s, and continued to perform in clubs.

He died in Tucson in 2007, aged 89.

== Discography ==
With Wild Bill Davis

- Free, Frantic and Funky (RCA Victor, 1965)
- Con-Soul and Sax (RCA Victor, 1965)
- Live at Count Basie's (RCA Victor, 1966)
- Wild Bill Davis & Johnny Hodges in Atlantic City (RCA Victor, 1967)
- Midnight to Dawn (RCA Victor, 1967)
- Doin' His Thing (RCA Victor, 1969)
