= Con-Soul & Sax =

Studio album by Wild Bill Davis and Johnny Hodges
- Released: 1965
- Recorded: January 7, 1965
- Studio: RCA Victor, New York City
- Genre: Jazz
- Label: RCA Victor LPM-3393
- Producer: Joe René

Johnny Hodges chronology
Blue Rabbit (1964)	Con-Soul & Sax (1965)	Joe's Blues (1965)

Wild Bill Davis chronology
Free Frantic and Funky (1965)	Con-Soul & Sax (1965)	Joe's Blues (1965)

Con-Soul & Sax is an album by American jazz saxophonist Johnny Hodges and organist Wild Bill Davis featuring performances recorded in 1965 and released on the RCA Victor label. The title is a play on words based on the term "console organ", which is a term for an organ having at least two 61-note manuals and a 25-note radiating pedal clavier. Both the Hammond B-3 and C-3, which Davis played most frequently, are console organs.

== Reception ==
Professional ratings
Review scores
Source	Rating
Allmusic	4.5/5 stars
Record Mirror	3/5 stars

The Allmusic site awarded the album 4½ stars.

== Track listing ==
1. "On the Sunny Side of the Street" (Jimmy McHugh, Dorothy Fields) - 3:45
2. "On Green Dolphin Street" (Bronisław Kaper, Ned Washington) - 3:13
3. "Lil' Darlin'" (Neal Hefti) - 4:09
4. "Con-Soul and Sax" (Wild Bill Davis) - 4:51
5. "The Jeep Is Jumpin'" (Duke Ellington) - 2:25
6. "I'm Beginning to See the Light" (Ellington, Don George, Johnny Hodges, Harry James) - 3:25
7. "Sophisticated Lady" (Ellington, Irving Mills, Mitchell Parish) - 4:01
8. "Drop Me Off in Harlem" (Ellington, Nick Kenny) - 4:24
9. "No One" (Hodges, Mercer Ellington) - 3:19
10. "Johnny Come Lately" (Billy Strayhorn) - 3:06

== Personnel ==
- Wild Bill Davis - organ
- Johnny Hodges - alto saxophone
- Dickie Thompson - lead guitar
- Mundell Lowe - rhythm guitar
- Milt Hinton, George Duvivier - double bass
- Osie Johnson - drums
