= Don't Sleep in the Subway (album) =

Studio album by Johnny Hodges
- Released: 1967
- Recorded: August 17, 18 & 21, 1967; New York City
- Genre: Jazz
- Label: Verve V/V6 8732
- Producer: Esmond Edwards

Johnny Hodges chronology
Triple Play (1967)	Don't Sleep in the Subway (1967)	Swing's Our Thing (1967)

Don't Sleep in the Subway is an album by American jazz saxophonist Johnny Hodges featuring performances with a big band recorded in 1967 and released on the Verve label.

== Reception ==
Professional ratings
Review scores
Source	Rating
Allmusic	3/5 stars

The Allmusic site awarded the album 3 stars stating "The orchestrations are uneven, but Johnny Hodges is uniformly sharp".

== Track listing ==
All compositions by Johnny Hodges except as indicated

1. "Don't Sleep in the Subway" (Tony Hatch, Jackie Trent) - 3:20
2. "The Wonder of You" (Duke Ellington, Johnny Hodges, Don George) - 2:44
3. "Serenade in Blue" (Frank Signorelli, Mitchell Parish) - 3:08
4. "Everytime She Walks" (Jimmy Jones) - 3:47
5. "Wisteria" (Jones, Ellington) - 2:47
6. "Heel Kickin'" - 3:38
7. "You've Changed" (Bill Carey, Carl T. Fischer) - 2:51
8. "Some Fun" - 3:40
9. "Eydie-Dee Dee" - 4:27

== Personnel ==
- Johnny Hodges - alto saxophone
- Ernie Royal, Snooky Young - trumpet
- Bill Berry - trumpet, vibraphone
- Tony Studd - bass trombone
- Jerome Richardson, Frank Wess - flute, clarinet, alto saxophone
- Jimmy Hamilton - clarinet, tenor saxophone
- Danny Bank - baritone saxophone, clarinet
- Hank Jones - piano
- Everett Barksdale - guitar
- Milt Hinton - double bass
- Grady Tate - drums
- Jimmy Jones - arranger, conductor
