= Jimmy Mundy =

American jazz saxophonist, arranger and composer (1907–1983)

- Born: June 28, 1907; Cincinnati, Ohio, U.S.
- Died: April 24, 1983 (aged 75) New York City, New York, U.S.
- Genre: Jazz
- Occupations: Musician, composer, arranger
- Instrument: Saxophone

James Mundy (June 28, 1907 – April 24, 1983) was an American jazz tenor saxophonist, arranger, and composer, best known for his arrangements for Benny Goodman, Count Basie, and Earl Hines.

Mundy died of cancer in New York City at the age of 75.

== Discography ==
=== Jimmy Mundy / Jimmy Mundy Orchestra ===
- 1937–1947: Jimmy Mundy 1937–1947 (Classics 1200)
- May 1946: "Bumble Boogie" / "One O'Clock Boogie" (Aladdin 131)
- June 1946: "I Gotta Put You Down Pt 1" / "I Gotta Put You Down Pt 2" (Aladdin 132)
- 1958: On a Mundy Flight (Epic LN 3475)
- 2002: Fiesta in Brass (Golden Era LP-15060)

=== As arranger ===
With Chet Baker

- Baker's Holiday (Limelight, 1965)

With Al Hibbler

- After the Lights Go Down Low (Atlantic 1957)

With Illinois Jacquet

- The Soul Explosion (Prestige, 1969)

With Harry James

- Harry James and His Orchestra 1948–49 (Big Band Landmarks Vol. X & XI, 1969)

With Sonny Stitt

- Sonny Stitt & the Top Brass (Atlantic, 1962)
- Little Green Apples (Solid State, 1969)
- Come Hither (Solid State, 1969)

With Joe Williams

- A Man Ain't Supposed to Cry (Roulette, 1958)
