= Creamy (album) =

Studio album by Johnny Hodges
- Released: 1955
- Recorded: September 8, 1955; New York City
- Genre: Jazz
- Length: 46:29
- Label: Norgran MGN 1045
- Producer: Norman Granz

Johnny Hodges chronology
Dance Bash (1955)	Creamy (1955)	Ellingtonia '56 (1956)

Creamy is an album recorded by American jazz saxophonist Johnny Hodges featuring performances with members of the Duke Ellington Orchestra recorded in 1955 and released on the Norgran label.

== Reception ==
Professional ratings
Review scores
Source	Rating
AllMusic	4/5 stars

The AllMusic site awarded the album 4 stars out of 5 and noted "While there are no real surprises anywhere on this record, it is well worth acquiring".

== Track listing ==
All compositions by Johnny Hodges, except as indicated.

1. "The Ballad Medley: Whispering/Tenderly/Don't Take Your Love from Me/Prelude to a Kiss/Polka Dots and Moonbeams/Passion Flower" (Vincent Rose, John Schonberger, Richard Coburn/Walter Gross, Jack Lawrence/Henry Nemo/Duke Ellington, Irving Gordon, Irving Mills/Jimmy Van Heusen, Johnny Burke/Billy Strayhorn) - 15:19
2. "Scufflin'" (Cue Hodges) - 8:13
3. "Honey Bunny" - 6:37
4. "Passion" (Strayhorn) - 3:20
5. "Pretty Little Girl" (Strayhorn) - 2:28
6. "No Use Kicking" - 10:32

== Personnel ==
- Johnny Hodges - alto saxophone
- Clark Terry - trumpet
- Lawrence Brown - trombone
- Jimmy Hamilton - clarinet, tenor saxophone
- Harry Carney - baritone saxophone
- Billy Strayhorn - piano
- Jimmy Woode - bass
- Sonny Greer - drums
