= Duke Ellington and His Orchestra in a Mellotone =

Compilation album by Duke Ellington
- Released: 1956
- Label: Columbia

Duke Ellington and His Orchestra in a Mellotone (or simply In a Mellotone) is a compilation album by Duke Ellington and his orchestra, released by Columbia in 1956.

== Critical reception ==
Professional ratings
Review scores
Source	Rating
Billboard	positive

Billboard reviewed the album in its issue from December 29, 1956, writing: "Here's a fine collectors' item, which should chalk up an impressive sales record as well as plenty of deejay spins. Album spotlights Ellington's wonderful band of 1940, '41 and '42, and includes such all-time great Ellingtonia as "Take the 'A' Train," "I Got It Bad" with Ivy Anderson, and "In a Mellotone."

== Track listing ==
12-inch LP (Columbia LPM 1364)

Side 1
No.	Title	Writer(s)	Artist(s)	Length
1.	"Take the "A" Train"	Strayhorn	Duke Ellington and his orchestra
2.	"A Portrait of Bert Williams"	Ellington
3.	"Main Stem"	Ellington	Duke Ellington and his orchestra
4.	"Just A-Settin' and A-Rockin'"	Ellington–Strayhorn
5.	"I Got It Bad (and That Ain't Good)" (from the mus. prod. Jump for Joy)	Webster–Ellington	Duke Ellington and his orchestra Vocal by Ivy Anderson
6.	"Perdido"	Tizol
7.	"Blue Serge"	M. Ellington	Duke Ellington and his orchestra
8.	"The Flaming Sword"	Ellington	Duke Ellington and his orchestra

Side 2
No.	Title	Writer(s)	Artist(s)	Length
1.	"In a Mellotone"	Ellington	Duke Ellington and his orchestra
2.	"Cotton Tail"	Ellington	Duke Ellington and his orchestra
3.	"I Don't Know What Kind of Blues I Got"	Ellington	Duke Ellington and his orchestra Vocal by Herb Jeffries
4.	"Rumpus in Richmond"	Ellington
5.	"All Too Soon"	Sigman–Ellington	Duke Ellington and his orchestra
6.	"Sepia Panorama"	Ellington	Duke Ellington and his orchestra
7.	"Rocks in My Bed" (from the mus. prod. Jump for Joy)	Ellington	Duke Ellington and his orchestra Vocal by Ivy Anderson
8.	"What Am I Here For?"	Ellington	Duke Ellington and his orchestra
