= Triple Play (Johnny Hodges album) =

Studio album by Johnny Hodges
- Released: 1967
- Recorded: January 10–11, 1967
- Studio: RCA Victor Studio A, NYC
- Genre: Jazz
- Length: 47:16
- Label: RCA Victor LSP-3867
- Producer: Brad McCuen

Johnny Hodges chronology
Blue Notes (1966)	Triple Play (1967)	Don't Sleep in the Subway (1967)

Triple Play is an album by American jazz saxophonist Johnny Hodges recorded in 1967 and released on the RCA Victor label.

== Reception ==
Professional ratings
Review scores
Source	Rating
AllMusic	4/5 stars

Allmusic says "Despite the many changes in personnel, the music is pretty consistent, with basic swinging originals, blues and ballads all heard in equal proportion. As usual, Johnny Hodges ends up as the main star". In JazzTimes, Stanley Dance called it a "happy, unpretentious set".

== Track listing ==
All compositions by Johnny Hodges except where noted.

1. "Take 'Em Off, Take 'Em Off Part 1" – 3:39
2. "Take 'Em Off, Take 'Em Off Part 2" – 2:56
3. "The Nearness of You" (Hoagy Carmichael, Ned Washington) – 3:46
4. "Monkey on a Limb" – 3:53 Additional track on CD reissue
5. "A Tiny Bit of Blues" – 4:53
6. "For Jammers Only" (Claude Bolling) – 3:02
7. "On the Way Up" – 2:52
8. "Big Boy Blues" – 3:20 Additional track on CD reissue
9. "The Very Thought of You" (Ray Noble) – 2:49
10. "Fur Piece" – 6:22
11. "Sir John" – 3:19
12. "Figurine" – 2:39 Additional track on CD reissue
13. "C Jam Blues" (Duke Ellington, Barney Bigard) – 4:21

== Personnel ==
- Johnny Hodges – alto saxophone
- Cat Anderson – trumpet (tracks: 6, 7, 9, 11, 12)
- Roy Eldridge – trumpet (tracks: 8, 10, 13)
- Ray Nance – cornet (tracks: 1–5)
- Benny Powell – trombone (tracks: 8, 10, 13)
- Buster Cooper – trombone (tracks: 1–5)
- Lawrence Brown – trombone (tracks: 6, 7, 9, 11, 12)
- Jimmy Hamilton – tenor saxophone (tracks: 6, 7, 9, 11, 12)
- Paul Gonsalves – tenor saxophone (tracks: 1–5)
- Harry Carney – baritone saxophone (tracks: 8, 10, 13)
- Bill Berry – vibraphone (tracks: 6, 7, 9, 11, 12)
- Hank Jones – piano (tracks: 1–5)
- Jimmy Jones – piano
- Nat Pierce – piano (tracks: 8, 10, 13)
- Billy Butler – guitar (tracks: 8, 10, 13)
- Tiny Grimes – guitar (tracks: 1–5)
- Les Spann – guitar (tracks: 6, 7, 9, 11, 12)
- Aaron Bell – double bass (tracks: 6, 7, 9, 11, 12)
- Joe Benjamin – double bass (tracks: 8, 10, 13)
- Milt Hinton – double bass (tracks: 1–5)
- Oliver Jackson – drums (tracks: 8, 10, 13)
- Gus Johnson – drums (tracks: 1–5)
- Rufus Jones – drums (tracks: 6, 7, 9, 11, 12)
