= Joe's Blues (Johnny Hodges and Wild Bill Davis album) =

Studio album by Johnny Hodges and Wild Bill Davis
- Released: 1965
- Recorded: January 6 & 7, 1965
- Studio: Van Gelder Studio, Englewood Cliffs, NJ
- Genre: Jazz
- Length: 36:38
- Label: Verve V/V6 8617
- Producer: Creed Taylor

Johnny Hodges chronology
| Con-Soul & Sax (1965) | Joe's Blues (1965) | Wings & Things (1965) |

Wild Bill Davis chronology
| Con-Soul & Sax (1965) | Joe's Blues (1965) | Wings & Things (1965) |

Joe's Blues is an album recorded by American jazz saxophonist Johnny Hodges and organist Wild Bill Davis featuring performances recorded in 1965 and released on the Verve label.

== Reception ==
Professional ratings
Review scores
| Source | Rating |
|---|---|
| Allmusic | 3/5 stars |
| Record Mirror | 4/5 stars |

The Allmusic site awarded the album 3 stars.

== Track listing ==
1. "Joe's Blues" (Wild Bill Davis) - 6:03
2. "I'll Walk Alone" (Jule Styne, Sammy Cahn) - 4:23
3. "Harmony in Harlem" (Duke Ellington, Irving Mills, Johnny Hodges) - 3:30
4. "Warm Valley" (Ellington) - 4:27
5. "Wild Bill Blues" (Hodges) - 5:10
6. "Somebody Loves Me" (George Gershwin, Ballard MacDonald, Buddy DeSylva) - 4:55
7. "Solitude" (Ellington, Eddie DeLange, Irving Mills) - 6:00
8. "Clementine" (Billy Strayhorn) - 3:10

== Personnel ==
- Johnny Hodges - alto saxophone
- Wild Bill Davis - organ
- Lawrence Brown - trombone
- Grant Green - guitar
- Bob Cranshaw - double bass (tracks 1, 3, 4 & 7)
- Bob Bushnell - electric bass (tracks 2, 5, 6 & 8)
- Grady Tate - drums
