= Swing's Our Thing =

Studio album by Johnny Hodges and Earl "Fatha" Hines
- Released: 1968
- Recorded: November 14 & 15, 1967
- Studio: Coast Recorders Inc., San Francisco, CA
- Genre: Jazz
- Label: Verve V/V6 8732
- Producer: Esmond Edwards

Johnny Hodges chronology
Don't Sleep in the Subway (1967)	Swing's Our Thing (1968)	Rippin' & Runnin' (1968)

Swing's Our Thing is an album by American jazz saxophonist Johnny Hodges and pianist Earl Hines featuring performances recorded in 1967 and released on the Verve label.

== Reception ==
Professional ratings
Review scores
Source	Rating
AllMusic	3/5 stars

The AllMusic site awarded the album 3 stars stating, "The jumping tunes are given concise performances (six songs are under three minutes long and none are longer than 4:10), but the musicians take advantage of every second they have on this rather brief album. ...this is a notable obscurity from some of jazz's all-time greats".

== Track listing ==
All compositions by Johnny Hodges, except as indicated.

1. "Open Ears" - 4:10
2. "Mean to Me" (Fred E. Ahlert, Roy Turk) - 2:28
3. "Doll Valley" (Tom Whaley) - 4:08
4. "Can a Moose Crochet?" - 2:58
5. "One Night in Trinidad" (Earl Hines) - 2:48
6. "Night Train to Memphis" (Cat Anderson, Duke Ellington) - 3:40
7. "Bustin' with Buster" - 3:24
8. "Over the Rainbow" (Harold Arlen, Yip Harburg) - 2:27
9. "Do It Yourself" (Anderson) - 2:15
10. "The Cannery Walk" (Hines) - 2:25

== Personnel ==
- Johnny Hodges - alto saxophone
- Earl "Fatha" Hines - piano
- Cat Anderson - trumpet
- Buster Cooper - trombone
- Jimmy Hamilton - clarinet, tenor saxophone
- Jeff Castleman - double bass
- Sam Woodyard - drums
