= Come Hither =

Studio album by Sonny Stitt
- Released: 1969
- Recorded: 1969
- Genre: Jazz
- Label: Solid State; SS 18057
- Producer: Richard Carpenter

Sonny Stitt chronology
Little Green Apples (1969)	Come Hither (1969)	It's Magic (1969)

Come Hither is an album by saxophonist Sonny Stitt recorded in 1969 and released on the Solid State label.

== Reception ==
Professional ratings
Review scores
Source	Rating
Allmusic	3/5 stars

Allmusic awarded the album 3 stars.

== Track listing ==
1. "Mendocino" (Doug Sahm)
2. "Gentle on My Mind" (John Hartford)
3. "I'm Gonna Make You Love Me" (Kenneth Gamble, Jerry Ross)
4. "Wichita Lineman" (Jimmy Webb)
5. "Tasty Cakes"
6. "Private Number"
7. "Gimme Gimme Good Lovin'" (Joey Levine, Ritchie Cordell)
8. "For Once in My Life" (Ron Miller, Orlando Murden)
9. "California Soul" (Nickolas Ashford, Valerie Simpson)
10. "Jo-Ann"
11. "Soiree (Night Party)"

== Personnel ==
- Sonny Stitt - varitone, tenor saxophone
- Jerome Richardson - flute
- Paul Griffin - piano
- Billy Butler - guitar
- Bob Russell - electric bass
- Joe Marshall - drums
- Jimmy Mundy - arranger, conductor
