= Wild Bill Davis & Johnny Hodges in Atlantic City =

Live album by Johnny Hodges and Wild Bill Davis
- Released: 1967
- Recorded: September 10–11, 1966
- Venue: Grace's Little Belmont, Atlantic City, NJ
- Genre: Jazz
- Length: 47:16
- Label: RCA Victor LPM-3706
- Producer: Brad McCuen

Johnny Hodges chronology
Blue Pyramid (1966)	Wild Bill Davis & Johnny Hodges in Atlantic City (1967)	Blue Notes (1966)

Wild Bill Davis chronology
Live at Count Basie's (1966)	Wild Bill Davis & Johnny Hodges in Atlantic City (1966)	Midnight to Dawn (1967)

Wild Bill Davis & Johnny Hodges in Atlantic City is a live album by American jazz saxophonist Johnny Hodges and organist Wild Bill Davis. The album features performances recorded in Atlantic City in 1966 and was released on the RCA Victor label.

== Reception ==
Professional ratings
Review scores
Source	Rating
AllMusic	4.5/5 stars

AllMusic says "This is a top-notch session of top-notch musicians just enjoying one another's company. It's jazz that puts a smile on your face".

== Track listing ==
All compositions by Johnny Hodges except where noted

1. "Just Squeeze Me" (Duke Ellington, Lee Gaines) – 4:45 Additional track on CD reissue
2. "It's Only a Paper Moon" (Harold Arlen, Yip Harburg, Billy Rose) – 2:59
3. "Taffy" (Johnny Hodges, Wild Bill Davis) – 5:38
4. "Good Queen Bess" – 3:22
5. "L B Blues" – 5:40
6. "In a Mellow Tone" (Ellington, Milt Gabler) – 3:47
7. "Rockville" – 6:36
8. "I'll Always Love You" (Davis) – 3:51
9. "It Don't Mean a Thing (If It Ain't Got That Swing)" (Ellington, Irving Mills) – 5:40
10. "Belle of the Belmont" (Mercer Ellington, Hodges) – 4:58

== Personnel ==
- Johnny Hodges – alto saxophone
- Wild Bill Davis – organ
- Bob Brown – tenor saxophone, flute
- Dickie Thompson – guitar
- Bobby Durham – drums
- Lawrence Brown - trombone
