= Stride Right =

Studio album by Johnny Hodges and Earl "Fatha" Hines
- Released: 1966
- Recorded: January 14, 1966
- Studio: Van Gelder Studio, Englewood Cliffs, NJ
- Genre: Jazz
- Length: 33:02
- Label: Verve V/V6 8647
- Producer: Creed Taylor

Johnny Hodges chronology
Inspired Abandon (1965)	Stride Right (1966)	Blue Pyramid (1966)

Stride Right is an album by American jazz saxophonist Johnny Hodges and pianist/organist Earl "Fatha" Hines featuring performances recorded in 1966 and released on the Verve label.

== Reception ==
Professional ratings
Review scores
Source	Rating
AllMusic	4/5 stars

AllMusic reviewer Ken Dryden stated: "The 1966 meeting of alto saxophonist Johnny Hodges and pianist Earl Hines in the studio should be considered a cause for celebration for swing fans. ...highly recommended".

== Track listing ==
All compositions by Earl Hines, except as indicated.

1. "Caution Blues" - 2:53
2. "Stride Right" - 2:55
3. "Rosetta" (Earl Hines, Henri Woode) - 3:34
4. "Perdido" (Juan Tizol, Ervin Drake, Hans Lengsfelder) - 5:05
5. "Fantastic, That's You" (George Cates, George Douglas) - 2:52
6. "Tale of the Fox" (Mercer Ellington, Johnny Hodges) - 4:36
7. "I'm Beginning to See the Light" (Duke Ellington, Don George, Johnny Hodges, Harry James) - 2:55
8. "C Jam Blues" (Ellington) - 5:05
9. "Tippin' In" (Bobby Smith, Marty Symes) - 3:07

== Personnel ==
- Johnny Hodges - alto saxophone
- Earl "Fatha" Hines - piano, organ
- Kenny Burrell - guitar
- Richard Davis - double bass
- Joe Marshall - drums
