= Blue Pyramid (Johnny Hodges and Wild Bill Davis album) =

Studio album by Johnny Hodges and Wild Bill Davis
- Released: 1966
- Recorded: November 19, 1965, December 27, 1965 and January 17, 1966
- Studio: NYC
- Genre: Jazz
- Length: 33:02
- Label: Verve V/V6 8635
- Producer: Creed Taylor

Johnny Hodges chronology
Stride Right (1966)	Blue Pyramid (1966)	Wild Bill Davis & Johnny Hodges in Atlantic City (1966)

Wild Bill Davis chronology
Wings & Things (1965)	Blue Pyramid (1966)	Live at Count Basie's (1966)

Blue Pyramid is an album by American jazz saxophonist Johnny Hodges and organist Wild Bill Davis featuring performances recorded in late 1965 and early 1966 and released on the Verve label.

== Reception ==
Professional ratings
Review scores
Source	Rating
AllMusic	3/5 stars

Allmusic awarded the album 3 stars with its review by Scott Yanow stating, "Although the blues feeling (as pointed out in the liner notes) is emphasized throughout the date, many of the songs, including "The Brown Skin Gal in the Calico Gown" and "Stormy Weather," are not really blues, but only bluesy. Overall this is a fine outing".

== Track listing ==
All compositions by Johnny Hodges except where noted

1. "Blues for Madeleine" – 4:48
2. "Feelin' Kinda Blues" (Gerald Wilson) – 2:30
3. "Pyramid" (Duke Ellington, Juan Tizol, Irving Gordon, Irving Mills) – 2:10
4. "Nonchalance" (Wild Bill Davis) – 4:45
5. "At Dawn" (Johnny Hodges, Thomas Whaley) – 3:00
6. "The Brown-Skin Gal in the Calico Gown" (Ellington, Paul Francis Webster) – 2:35
7. "Stormy Weather" (Harold Arlen, Ted Koehler) – 3:56
8. "Rabbit Out of the Hat" – 5:10
9. "Hash Brown" – 4:00

== Personnel ==
- Johnny Hodges – alto saxophone
- Wild Bill Davis – organ (tracks 1–4 & 6–9)
- Lawrence Brown – trombone
- Jimmy Hamilton – clarinet (tracks 1–3, 5, 6, 8 & 9)
- Jimmy Jones – piano (track 5)
- Billy Butler – guitar
- Bob Bushnell – bass (tracks 1–3 & 5–9)
- Johnny Hodges Jr. (track 6), Herbie Lovelle (tracks 2, 3 & 5), Joe Marshall (tracks 1, 4 & 6–9) – drums
