= Brooks Kerr =

American jazz pianist (1951–2018)

- Born: Chester Monson Brooks Joseph Kerr III; December 26, 1951; New Haven, Connecticut U.S.
- Died: April 28, 2018 (aged 66) New York City, U.S.
- Genres: Jazz
- Occupation: Musician
- Instrument: Piano
- Years active: 1956-2018
- Labels: Famous Door; Chiaroscuro Records; Blue Wail Records
- Formerly of: Sonny Greer; Russell Procope

Chester Monson Brooks Joseph Kerr III (December 26, 1951 – April 28, 2018) was an American jazz pianist. He was perhaps best known for being bandleader of a small group featuring Sonny Greer and Russell Procope and for his knowledge of Duke Ellington's work, which he often performed.

== Early life and education ==
Kerr was born in New Haven, Connecticut, to Chester Kerr, a notable editor who worked at Yale University Press from 1949 until 1979, and Edith Kerr (née Chilewich), an editor and writer.

Kerr was born premature, and suffered from a degenerative retinal disease called retrolental fibroplasia, which made him blind in one eye and only partially seeing in the other. By the time he was 28, Kerr was totally blind due to glaucoma.

Because of his blindness, his parents focused on teaching him to focus on other senses, notably music. Kerr learned the piano by assigning colors in his mind for each key. He became a child prodigy on the piano.

When he was 2 years old, Kerr took lessons from Jane Stevens at Yale University, and attended Dr. Milton Senn's Child Study Center.

From 1954 to 1956, Kerr took private lessons from Jean Brown. He then attended the Foote School in New Haven.

In 1958, Kerr studied jazz with Lucky Roberts. From 1961 to 1963, Kerr worked with Russell Rega in New Haven.

In 1963, Kerr's parents got divorced. He and his siblings lived with his mother in New York City. From 1964 to 1972 studied piano with Sanford Gold. From 1969 to 1973, Kerr was a student of Willie "The Lion" Smith.

From 1966 to 1970, Kerr attended the Dalton School. He also attended the Manhattan School of Music. He attended The Juilliard School, as well, up until 1972.

== Career ==
The band Kerr led with Greer and Procope frequented Greenwich Village jazz clubs and hotels in the New York City area.

Kerr was an expert on Duke Ellington.

Kerr also participated in several tributary projects devoted to Duke Ellington that featured former members of Ellington's crew, such as Ray Nance and Francis Williams.

== Death ==
Kerr died in New York City on April 28, 2018. He had kidney disease.

== Discography ==
- 1974: Prevue, Brooks Kerr-Paul Quinichette Quartet with Gene Ramey & Sam Woodyard (Famous Door)
- 1975: Soda Fountain Rag (The Music Of Duke Ellington) (aka Poodle Dog Rag), Brooks Kerr (Chiaroscuro Records)
- 1981: Brooks Kerr Salutes Fats Waller, Brooks Kerr (Blue Wail Records)
- 1981: Brooks Kerr Salutes Irving Berlin, Brooks Kerr (Blue Wail Records)
- 1982: Brooks Kerr Salutes Duke Ellington, Brooks Kerr (Blue Wail Records)
