= Rippin' & Runnin' =

Studio album by Johnny Hodges
- Released: 1969
- Recorded: December 9–10, 1968
- Studio: A & R Studios, NYC
- Genre: Jazz
- Length: 33:31
- Label: Verve V/V6 8753
- Producer: Esmond Edwards

Johnny Hodges chronology
Swing's Our Thing (1967)	Rippin' & Runnin' (1969)	3 Shades of Blue (1970)

Professional ratings
Review scores
Source	Rating
AllMusic	3/5 stars

Rippin' & Runnin' is an album by American jazz saxophonist Johnny Hodges featuring performances recorded in 1968 and released on the Verve label.

== Track listing ==
1. "Cue Time" (Edith Cue Hodges) – 4:53
2. "Rio Segundo" (Johnny Hodges) – 3:23
3. "Jeep Bounces Back" (Edith Cue Hodges) – 5:50
4. "Rippin' and Runnin'" (Tom McIntosh) – 4:13
5. "Touch Love" (Alonzo Levister) – 4:00
6. "Tell Everybody's Children" (McIntosh) – 8:23
7. "Moonflower" (Don Sebesky) – 3:10

== Personnel ==
- Johnny Hodges – alto saxophone
- Willie Gardner – organ
- Jimmy Ponder – guitar
- Ron Carter – bass
- Freddie Waits – drums
