= Wings & Things =

Studio album by Johnny Hodges and Wild Bill Davis
- Released: 1965
- Recorded: July 26 & 27, 1965
- Studio: Van Gelder Studio, Englewood Cliffs, NJ
- Genre: Jazz
- Length: 35:01
- Label: Verve V/V6 8630
- Producer: Creed Taylor

Johnny Hodges chronology
Joe's Blues (1965)	Wings & Things (1965)	Inspired Abandon (1965)

Wild Bill Davis chronology
Free Frantic and Funky (1965)	Wings & Things (1965)	Blue Pyramid (1966)

Wings & Things is an album by American jazz saxophonist Johnny Hodges and organist Wild Bill Davis featuring performances recorded in 1965 and released on the Verve label.

== Reception ==
Professional ratings
Review scores
Source	Rating
Allmusic	3/5 stars

The Allmusic site awarded the album 3 stars stating "The group always swings, and it is interesting to hear Hodges in this setting".

== Track listing ==
All compositions by Johnny Hodges except as noted

1. "Wings and Things" - 7:10
2. "The Nearness of You" (Hoagy Carmichael, Ned Washington) - 3:08
3. "Imbo (Limbo Jazz)" (Duke Ellington) - 3:52
4. "Take the "A" Train" (Billy Strayhorn) - 4:00
5. "Spotted Dog" - 7:20
6. "Cassanova" (Wild Bill Davis) - 2:43
7. "Dow De Dow Dow Dow" (Ellington, Hodges) - 3:22
8. "Peg o' My Heart" (Alfred Bryan, Fred Fisher) - 3:26

== Personnel ==
- Johnny Hodges - alto saxophone
- Wild Bill Davis - organ (tracks 1 & 5–8)
- Lawrence Brown - trombone (tracks 1 & 3–8)
- Grant Green - guitar (tracks 1 & 3–8)
- Hank Jones - piano (tracks 2–4)
- Richard Davis - double bass
- Ben Dixon - drums
