= Inspired Abandon =

Studio album by Lawrence Brown with Johnny Hodges
- Released: 1965
- Recorded: March 8, 1965
- Genre: Jazz
- Length: 31:48
- Label: Impulse!

Lawrence Brown chronology
Slide Trombone featuring Lawrence Brown (1955)	Inspired Abandon (1965)

Johnny Hodges chronology
Wings & Things (1965)	Inspired Abandon (1965)	Stride Right (1966)

Inspired Abandon is an album by American jazz trombonist Lawrence Brown with Johnny Hodges featuring performances recorded in 1965 for the Impulse! label. The album was rereleased on CD as bonus tracks on the American CD reissue of Everybody Knows Johnny Hodges.

== Reception ==
The Allmusic review awarded the album 4 stars.

Professional ratings
Review scores
Source	Rating
Allmusic	4/5 stars

== Track listing ==
All compositions by Johnny Hodges except as indicated

1. "Stompy Jones" (Duke Ellington) - 3:57
2. "Mood Indigo" (Ellington, Barney Bigard) - 4:22
3. "Good Queen Bess" - 3:05
4. "Little Brother" - 5:14
5. "Jeep's Blues" (Ellington, Hodges) - 5:40
6. "Do Nothin' Till You Hear From Me" (Ellington) - 2:33
7. "Ruint" (Ellington, Hodges) - 3:18
8. "Sassy Cue" - 3:39

- Recorded at Van Gelder Studios, Englewood Cliffs, New Jersey on March 8, 1965

== Personnel ==
- Lawrence Brown – trombone
- Johnny Hodges - alto saxophone
- Ray Nance - cornet
- Cat Anderson - trumpet (tracks 1 & 3–8)
- Buster Cooper - trombone (tracks 1 & 3–8)
- Jimmy Hamilton - clarinet (tracks 1 & 3–8)
- Russell Procope - alto saxophone, clarinet
- Harold Ashby, Paul Gonsalves - tenor saxophone (tracks 1 & 3–8)
- Jimmy Jones - piano
- Richard Davis – bass
- Gus Johnson (tracks 1, 3 & 5–8), Johnny Hodges Jr. (tracks 2 & 4) – drums
