= Little Green Apples (album) =

Studio album by Sonny Stitt
- Released: 1969
- Recorded: October 28, 1968
- Studio: Plaza Sound Studios, New York City
- Genre: Jazz
- Label: Solid State; SS 18047
- Producer: Richard Carpenter

Sonny Stitt chronology
Soul Electricity! (1968)	Little Green Apples (1969)	Come Hither (1969)

Little Green Apples is an album by saxophonist Sonny Stitt recorded in 1968 and released on the Solid State label.

== Reception ==
Professional ratings
Review scores
Source	Rating
Allmusic	3/5 stars

Allmusic awarded the album 3 stars.

== Track listing ==
1. "Little Green Apples" (Bobby Russell) - 2:30
2. "Beale Street Blues" (W.C. Handy) - 3:21
3. "I Say a Little Prayer" (Burt Bacharach, Hal David) - 2:30
4. "Oh Me, Oh My" (Jim Doris) - 2:42
5. "I Go Congo" (Clarence Muse) - 3:40
6. "Girl Watcher" (Buck Trail, Wayne Pittman) - 2:30
7. "I've Never Ever Loved Before" (Richard Carpenter) - 2:45
8. "Extra Special Delight" (Richard Carpenter) - 2:40
9. "Friendless Blues" (Mercedes Gilbert) - 4:15
10. "Ain'tcha Got Music" (James P. Johnson, Andy Razaf) - 3:36

== Personnel ==
- Sonny Stitt - varitone, tenor saxophone
- Haywood Henry - baritone saxophone
- Donald Corrado, Joseph DeAngelis - French horn
- Paul Griffin - piano
- Eric Gale - guitar
- Bob Russell - electric bass
- Joe Marshall - drums
- Jimmy Mundy - arranger, conductor
