= A Man Ain't Supposed to Cry =

Studio album by Joe Williams
- Released: 1958
- Recorded: October 11–21, 1957, in New York City
- Genre: Jazz, traditional pop
- Length: 31:59
- Label: Roulette R-52005

Joe Williams chronology
One O'Clock Jump (1957)	A Man Ain't Supposed to Cry (1958)	Breakfast Dance and Barbecue (1958)

A Man Ain't Supposed to Cry is a 1958 album by the American jazz singer Joe Williams arranged by Jimmy Mundy. It is an album of ballads and torch songs.

John Bush, reviewing the album for AllMusic, praises Williams as "an excellent balladeer with a rich vibrato and the confidence to let a straight reading speak for itself".

Gramophone critiqued the arrangements as using "strings quite excessively" and Williams's performances as "stress[ing] sentiment rather than swing".

The initial Billboard review from February 3, 1958, said that the album was a "convincing, well-performed ballad set" and that Williams's talent was "formidable". Mundy's orchestral arrangements were "mellifluous yet unobtrusive".

== Track listing ==
1. "What's New?" (Johnny Burke, Bob Haggart) – 2:43
2. "It's the Talk of the Town" (Jerry Livingston, Al J. Neiburg, Marty Symes) – 3:10
3. "I'll Never Smile Again" (Ruth Lowe) – 2:59
4. "I'm Through with Love" (Gus Kahn, Fud Livingston, Matty Malneck) – 2:54
5. "Where Are You?" (Harold Adamson, Jimmy McHugh) – 2:50
6. "I've Only Myself to Blame" (Redd Evans, Dave Mann) – 2:50
7. "Say It Isn't So" (Irving Berlin) – 2:54
8. "What Will I Tell My Heart" (Irving Gordon, Jack Lawrence, Peter Tinturin) – 2:40
9. "You've Got Me Crying Again" (Isham Jones, Charles Newman) – 2:46
10. "Can't We Talk It Over?" (Ned Washington, Lester Young, Victor Young) – 2:36
11. "I Laugh to Keep From Cryin'" (Lew Brown) – 2:58
12. "A Man Ain't Supposed to Cry" (Norman Gimbel, Frankie Laine, Irving Reid) – 3:33
