= Blue Notes (album) =

Studio album by Johnny Hodges
- Released: 1967
- Recorded: August 15 and 19, 1966 and October 24, 1966
- Studio: NYC
- Genre: Jazz
- Label: Verve V/V6 8680
- Producer: Creed Taylor

Johnny Hodges chronology
Wild Bill Davis & Johnny Hodges in Atlantic City (1966)	Blue Notes (1967)	Triple Play (1967)

Blue Notes is an album by American jazz saxophonist Johnny Hodges and orchestra featuring performances recorded in 1966 and released on the Verve label.

== Reception ==
Professional ratings
Review scores
Source	Rating
AllMusic	3/5 stars

AllMusic awarded the album 3 stars with its review by Ken Dryden stating, "the veteran alto saxophonist is backed by an all-star group with arrangements by conductor Jimmy Jones. Hodges' gorgeous tone and effortless ability to swing are the cornerstones of the album, especially in a stunning, very slow performance of "I Can't Believe That You're in Love With Me" and the jaunty original by the leader, "L.B. Blues"".

== Track listing ==
All compositions by Johnny Hodges except where noted.

1. "Blue Notes" – 2:50
2. "I Can't Believe That You're in Love with Me" (Jimmy McHugh, Clarence Gaskill) – 3:20
3. "Rent City" (V. Speddy) – 3:45
4. "Sometimes I'm Happy" (Vincent Youmans, Irving Caesar) – 2:40
5. "Broad Walk" – 3:30
6. "L. B. Blues" – 4:00
7. "The Midnight Sun Will Never Set" (Quincy Jones) – 3:30
8. "Say It Again" – 3:27
9. "Sneakin' Up on You" (Ted Daryll, Carl Taylor) – 5:30

== Personnel ==
- Johnny Hodges – alto saxophone
- Ernie Royal, Snooky Young – trumpet
- Tony Studd – bass trombone
- Jimmy Hamilton – clarinet, tenor saxophone
- Frank Wess – alto saxophone, flute
- Jerome Richardson – alto saxophone, flute, piccolo
- Don Ashworth (tracks 1, 2, 5, 6 & 8), Danny Bank (tracks 3, 4, 7 & 9) – baritone saxophone, bass clarinet
- Hank Jones – piano
- Kenny Burrell (tracks 1 & 8), Eric Gale (tracks 2–7 & 9) – guitar
- Bob Cranshaw (tracks 1, 2, 5, 6 & 8), George Duvivier (tracks 3, 4, 7 & 9) – bass
- Grady Tate – drums
- Joe Venuto – vibraphone, shakers (tracks 2–7 & 9)
- Jimmy Jones – arranger, conductor
