= Harlem (Ellington) =

Symphonic jazz composition by Duke Ellington

Harlem is a symphonic jazz composition by the American composer Duke Ellington.

Originally commissioned by Arturo Toscanini in 1950 as part of a larger New York City–inspired orchestral suite, Toscanini never conducted it. Ellington himself first recorded it on 7 December 1951 (as "A Tone Parallel to Harlem (Harlem Suite)" for his Ellington Uptown album), and it had been given its live premiere on 21 January 1951 in a benefit concert for the NAACP at the Metropolitan Opera House. It was first performed by symphony orchestra in 1955 at Carnegie Hall by Don Gillis and the Symphony of the Air.

The piece lasts for around fourteen minutes and exists in Ellington's large jazz orchestra version as well as a full symphonic version orchestrated by Luther Henderson. Both versions begin with a distinctive trumpet solo which intones the word "Harlem."

In his own memoirs Ellington wrote:

We would now like to take you on a tour of this place called Harlem... It is Sunday morning. We a strolling from 110th Street up Seventh Avenue, heading north through the Spanish and West Indian neighborhood towards the 125th Street business area... You may hear a parade go by, or a funeral, or you may recognize the passage of those who are making Civil Rights demands.

Ellington re-recorded it in Paris in 1963 (on The Symphonic Ellington album), with an orchestra of European symphonic musicians joining the band. In the album's liner notes, Ellington provided a detailed 20-part descriptive program of the music. The piece has since been recorded by a number of ensembles and conductors including Maurice Peress (in his own orchestration) with the American Composers Orchestra, Neeme Järvi with the Detroit Symphony Orchestra, Simon Rattle with the City of Birmingham Symphony Orchestra, and John Mauceri with the Hollywood Bowl Orchestra. Mauceri also produced a new edition of the full symphonic score. In 2012, it was recorded by JoAnn Falletta and the Buffalo Philharmonic Orchestra in the Peress orchestration.
