= Leroy Lovett =

American jazz musician

Leroy Lovett (March 17, 1919, Philadelphia - December 9, 2013, Chatsworth, California) was an American jazz pianist and arranger.

Lovett studied piano with Sophie Stokowski (the wife of Leopold Stokowski) from the age of four, and began composing early. He received a bachelor's degree from Temple University and then continued his studies at the Schillinger House of Music. He directed his own band in Philadelphia before settling in New York City in 1945. There he arranged for Tiny Bradshaw and Luis Russell, and worked with Noble Sissle, Lucky Millinder, and Mercer Ellington. He was in the band of Johnny Hodges (during his period away from Duke Ellington) and recorded with him until 1955. At the end of the 1950s, he was in the bands of Cootie Williams and Cat Anderson and recorded two albums under his own name.

From 1952, he was a music publisher, was a record producer in the 1950s (1956/57 for Norman Granz) and had a dance orchestra in Philadelphia. From 1959, he worked for Wynne Records and 1968 to 1973 for Motown Records. He also wrote film music. He was still active as a musician with the Melodymakers Orchestra, to which he had belonged since 1987 and for which he also arranged. He also appeared with the Uni-Bigband of Halle.

He recorded under his own name and with Al Sears (1951), Harry Carney, Al Hibbler (1954), Lawrence Brown, Billie Holiday (1955), Cootie Williams (1957), and Cat Anderson (1959), as well as Johnny Hodges.

== Discography ==
- Jazz Dance Party (Wynne Records, 1959)
- Lee Plus 3 (Wynne, 1959)
