= Wild Bill Davis =

American jazz pianist, organist, and arranger (1918–1995)

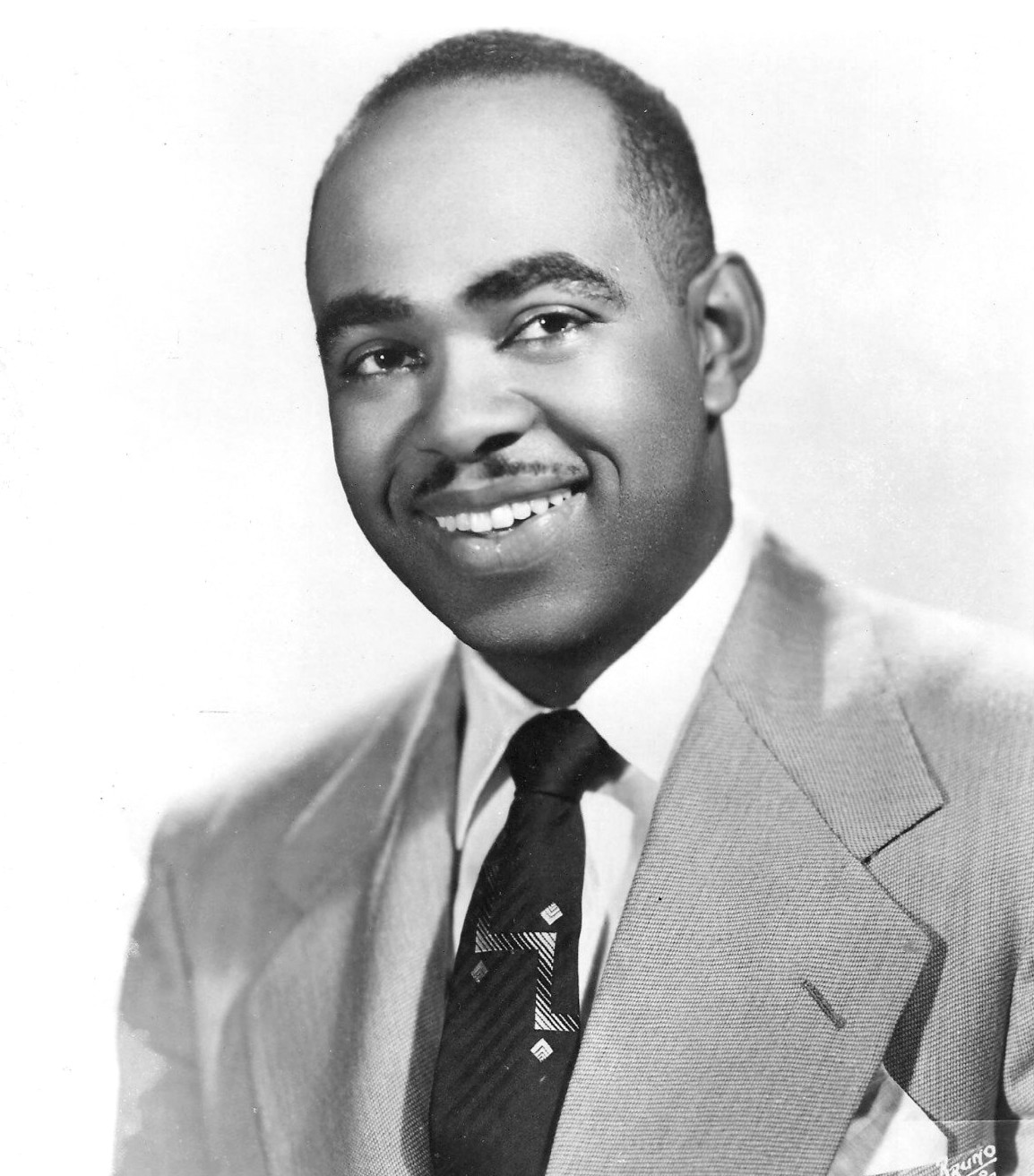
- Wild Bill Davis in 1954

Background information
- Born: William Strethen Davis; November 24, 1918; Glasgow, Missouri, U.S.
- Died: August 17, 1995 (aged 76) Moorestown, New Jersey, U.S.
- Genres: Jazz
- Occupations: Musician, arranger
- Instruments: Piano, organ

Wild Bill Davis (November 24, 1918 – August 17, 1995) was the stage name of American jazz pianist, organist, and arranger William Strethen Davis. He is best known for his pioneering jazz electric organ recordings and for his tenure with the Tympany Five, the backing group for Louis Jordan. Prior to the emergence of Jimmy Smith in 1956, Davis (whom Smith had reportedly first seen playing organ in the 1930s) was the pacesetter among organists.

== Biography ==
Davis was born in Glasgow, Missouri, and grew up in Parsons, Kansas. He first learned music from his father who was a professional singer. He received further musical training at the Tuskegee Institute (now Tuskegee University) in Alabama, and at Wiley College in Marshall, Texas. In his early career he took inspiration from Fats Waller and Art Tatum.

Davis moved to Chicago, where he originally played guitar and wrote arrangements for Milt Larkin's big band from 1939 through 1942; a band which included Arnett Cobb, Illinois Jacquet, and Tom Archia on horns. In 1943 he played guitar and wrote arrangements for Earl Hines. Davis first worked as a pianist in Chicago with Louis Jordan and his band Tympany Five, whom he played with regularly from 1945 through 1949.

After leaving Jordan and the Tympany Five, Davis pursued a career as an solo organist in 1950. In 1951 he formed the Bill Davis Trio (a.k.a. the "Wild Bill Davis Trio"), which consisted of Chris Columbus on drums and the left-handed guitarist Bill Jennings, that recorded for OKeh Records. Davis continued to lead his trio for decades, with other musicians swapping in and out periodically. The trio would always include organ and drums with either guitar or double bass. For decades his trio spent summers playing in Atlantic City, New Jersey.

Davis was originally supposed to record "April in Paris" with Count Basie's Orchestra in 1955 but when he could not make the session, Basie used his arrangement for the full band and had a major hit. Some musicians he did record with include saxophonists Frank Morgan (1955), Arnett Cobb (1959), and Johnny Hodges (1961, 1963–66); and singer Ella Fitzgerald (1963).

In addition to working with his own group, Davis recorded and led tours with Duke Ellington from 1969 through 1971. In the 1970s he recorded for the Black & Blue Records label in Paris with a variety of swing all-stars, including saxophonist and clarinetist Buddy Tate (1972); trombonist Al Grey (1972); saxophonist and blues shouter Eddie Vinson (1972); double bass player Slam Stewart (1972), tenor saxophonist Illinois Jacquet (1973), and tenor saxophonist Eddie “Lockjaw” Davis (1976). He played with Lionel Hampton from 1978 through 1980. In 1983 Davis recorded with French jazz saxophonist Guy Lafitte in 1983. In 1987 he toured with trombonist Grover Mitchell and his band. He also toured France with the ensemble '3 D' whose other members included French vibraphonist Dany Doriz and French drummer Michel Denis. He appeared at many music festivals internationally during the 1980s and into the early 1990s.

Davis died on August 17, 1995, in Moorestown, New Jersey.

== Discography ==
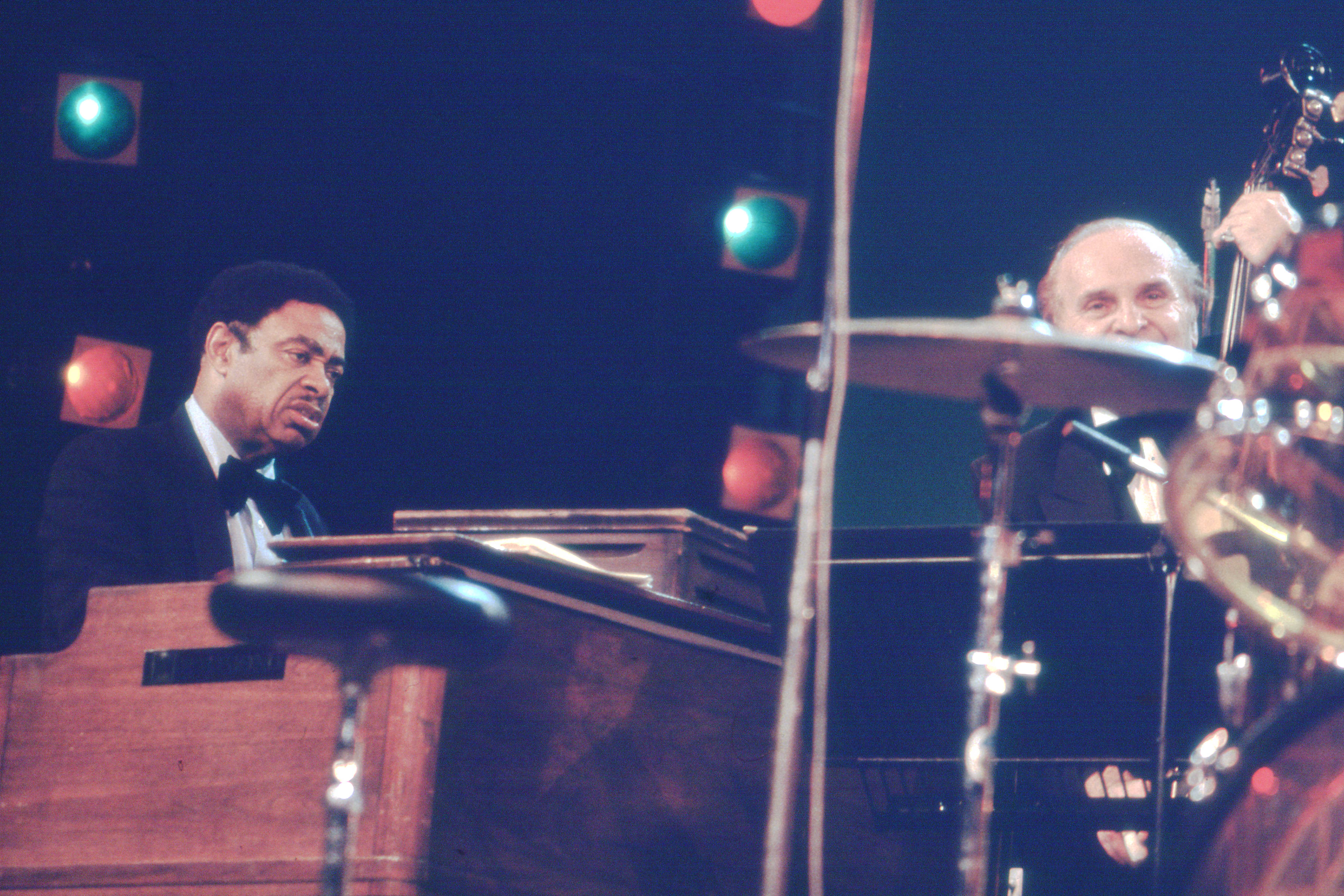
Wild Bill Davis (left) and double-bassist Chubby Jackson, North Sea Jazz Festival, 1979

=== As leader/co-leader ===
- 1951: "Eyesight To The Blind" // "Catch 'Em Young, Treat 'Em Rough, Tell 'Em Nothing" (OKeh 4-6808)
- 1951: "Chicken Gumbo" // "Hi Diddle Diddle" (OKeh 4-6836) – note: these four songs feature Bill Jennings, Chris Columbus (AKA Chris Columbo)
- 1952: Azure-Te (Paris Blues) (Columbia 4-39819, sung by Frank Sinatra, composition: Bill Davis, lyrics: Donald Wolf), No. 30 on Billboard Hot 100 in 27 September 1952.
- 1954: Here's Wild Bill Davis (Epic LG-1004 [10-inch LP]) – with Floyd Smith, Chris Columbus
- 1954: On The Loose (Epic LN-1121 [10-inch LP]) – with Floyd Smith, Chris Columbus
- 1955: Wild Bill Davis At Birdland (Epic LN-3118) – with Floyd Smith, Chris Columbus; reissued as Lullaby Of Birdland in 1972.
- 1955: Evening Concerto (Epic LN-3308) – with Floyd Smith, Chris Columbus
- 1956: Wild Bill Davis On Broadway (Imperial LP-9010) – with Floyd Smith, Joe Morris
- 1956: Wild Bill Davis In Hollywood (Imperial LP-9015) – with Floyd Smith, Joe Morris
- 1959: Wild Bill Davis Swings Hit Songs From "My Fair Lady" (Everest LPBR-5014/SDBR-1014) – with Maurice Simon, Milt Hinton, Jo Jones
- 1959: Flying High With Wild Bill Davis (Everest LPBR-5052/SDBR-1052) – with George Clark, Bill Jennings, Grady Tate
- 1960: Dance The Madison! (Everest LPBR-5094/SDBR-1094)
- 1960: Organ Grinder's Swing (Everest LPBR-5116/SDBR-1116) – reissue of Dance The Madison!
- 1960: “Aphrodisia” Jackie Gleason Orchestra (Capitol Records SW-1250) credited on back jacket!
- 1961: Dis Heah (This Here) (Everest LPBR-5125/SDBR-1125)
- 1961: The Music From Milk & Honey (Everest LPBR-5133/SDBR-1133) – with Charlie Shavers
- 1961: Blue Hodge (Verve V6-8406) – with Johnny Hodges; reissued on CD in 2007 by Lone Hill Jazz (LHJ10286).
- 1962: One More Time (Coral CRL-57417)
- 1962: Lover (Coral CRL-57427)
- 1963: Wild Wild Wild Wild Wild Wild Wild Wild Wild Wild Bill Davis (Imperial LP-9201/LP-12201)
- 1963: Mess of Blues (Verve V6-8570) – with Johnny Hodges, Kenny Burrell; reissued on CD in 2007 by Lone Hill Jazz (LHJ10285).
- 1964: Blue Rabbit (Verve V6-8599) – with Johnny Hodges; reissued on CD in 2007 by Lone Hill Jazz (LHJ10286).
- 1965: Free, Frantic And Funky (RCA Victor LSP-3314)
- 1965: Con-Soul & Sax (RCA Victor LSP-3393) – with Johnny Hodges; reissued on CD in 2007 by Lone Hill Jazz (LHJ10283).
- 1965: Joe's Blues (Verve V6-8617) – with Johnny Hodges, Grant Green; reissued on CD in 2007 by Lone Hill Jazz (LHJ10284).
- 1965: Wings & Things (Verve V6-8630) – with Johnny Hodges, Grant Green; reissued on CD in 2007 by Lone Hill Jazz (LHJ10284).
- 1966: Blue Pyramid (Verve V6-8635) – with Johnny Hodges; reissued on CD in 2007 by Lone Hill Jazz (LHJ10283).
- 1966: Live At Count Basie's (RCA Victor LSP-3578)
- 1966: Wild Bill Davis & Johnny Hodges in Atlantic City (RCA Victor LSP-3706) – with Johnny Hodges; reissued as In A Mellotone in 1990; reissued on CD in 2007 by Lone Hill Jazz (LHJ10283).
- 1967: Midnight to Dawn (RCA Victor LSP-3799)
- 1968: Flying Home (Sunset/Liberty SUM-1191/SUS-5191) – compilation of material recorded for Everest Records.
- 1969: Doin' His Thing (RCA Victor LSP-4139)
- 1971: Wonderful World Of Love (Tangerine TRCS-1509)
- 1972: Impulsions (Disques Black & Blue 33.037) – with Floyd Smith, Chris Columbus
- 1972: Midnight Slows, Vol. 2 (Disques Black & Blue 33.045) – with Buddy Tate, Floyd Smith, Chris Columbus
- 1972: Buddy Tate & Wild Bill Davis (Disques Black & Blue 33.054) – with Floyd Smith, Chris Columbus; reissued on CD as Broadway in 1987 by Black & Blue.
- 1973: Illinois Jacquet With Wild Bill Davis (Disques Black & Blue 33.044) – with Al Bartee; reissued on CD as The Man I Love in 1995 by Black & Blue.
- 1973: Illinois Jacquet With Wild Bill Davis, Vol. 2 (Disques Black & Blue 33.082) – with Al Bartee
- 1976: Wild Bill Davis & Eddie "Lockjaw" Davis Live! (Disques Black & Blue 33.303) – with Billy Butler, Oliver Jackson
- 1976: Wild Bill Davis & Eddie "Lockjaw" Davis Live! Vol. 2 (Disques Black & Blue 33.308) – with Billy Butler, Oliver Jackson
- 1976: All Right OK You Win (Disques Black & Blue 33.133) – with Eddie "Lockjaw" Davis, Billy Butler, Oliver Jackson
- 1986: Live At Swiss Radio, Studio Zürich (Jazz Connaisseur JCLP-8701) – with Clifford Scott, Dickie Thompson, Clyde Lucas
- 1986: Greatest Organ Solos Ever! (Jazz Connaisseur JCLP-8702) – solo organ
- 1987: 70th/30th Anniversary Live Concert (Die Mühle A-850581) – with Austrian jazz organist T.C. Pfeiler http://www.tcpfeiler.com
- 1990: Wild Bill Davis Super Trio: That's All (Jazz Connaisseur JCCD-9005) – with Plas Johnson, Butch Miles
- 2004: In the Groove! (Fresh Sound FSRCD-308) – with George Clark, Bill Jennings, Grady Tate; CD compilation of material recorded for Everest Records.
- 2004: In a Mellow Tone (Fresh Sound FSRCD-309) – with George Clark, Bill Jennings, Grady Tate; CD compilation of material recorded for Everest Records.
- 2005: Organology By Wild Bill Davis: April In Paris (Vol. 1) (Ocium Records [Spain] OCM-0046) – CD compilation of material recorded for Epic Records.
- 2005: Organology by Wild Bill Davis: Syncopated Clock (Vol. 2) (Ocium Records [Spain] OCM-0047) – CD compilation of material recorded for Epic Records.
- 2005: The Everest Years (Expanded Edition) (Empire Musicwerks/Re Records/V.I. Music 50719) – CD compilation of Davis' five Everest albums.
- 2014: Live at Sonny's Place 1985 (Squatty Roo Records SQU-217)
- 2014: Live at Sonny's Place 1986 (Squatty Roo Records SQU-218)
- 2021: The Wild Bill Davis Collection 1951-1960 (Acrobat Records ADDCD-3373) – 2CD compilation of material recorded for the OKeh, Epic, Imperial, and Everest labels.

=== As sideman ===
With Ray Brown / Milt Jackson

- Much in Common (Verve, 1964)

With Billy Butler

- Don't Be That Way (Black & Blue, 1976)

With Arnett Cobb

- Blow Arnett, Blow (Prestige, 1959)

With Gene "Mighty Flea" Conners

- Coming Home (Black & Blue, 1976)

With Eddie "Lockjaw" Davis

- Jaws Strikes Again (Black & Blue, 1976)

With Duke Ellington

- New Orleans Suite (Atlantic, 1970)
- 70th Birthday Concert (Solid State, 1970)

With Ella Fitzgerald

- These Are the Blues (Verve, 1963)

With Johnny Hodges

- Sandy's Gone (Verve, 1963)

With Frank Morgan

- Frank Morgan (Gene Norman Presents, 1955)

With Floyd Smith

- Floyd's Guitar Blues (Black & Blue, 1972)

With Sonny Stitt

- The Matadors Meet the Bull (Roulette, 1965)
- What's New!!! (Roulette, 1966)
