= Harry Carney =

American jazz saxophonist and clarinetist (1910–1974)

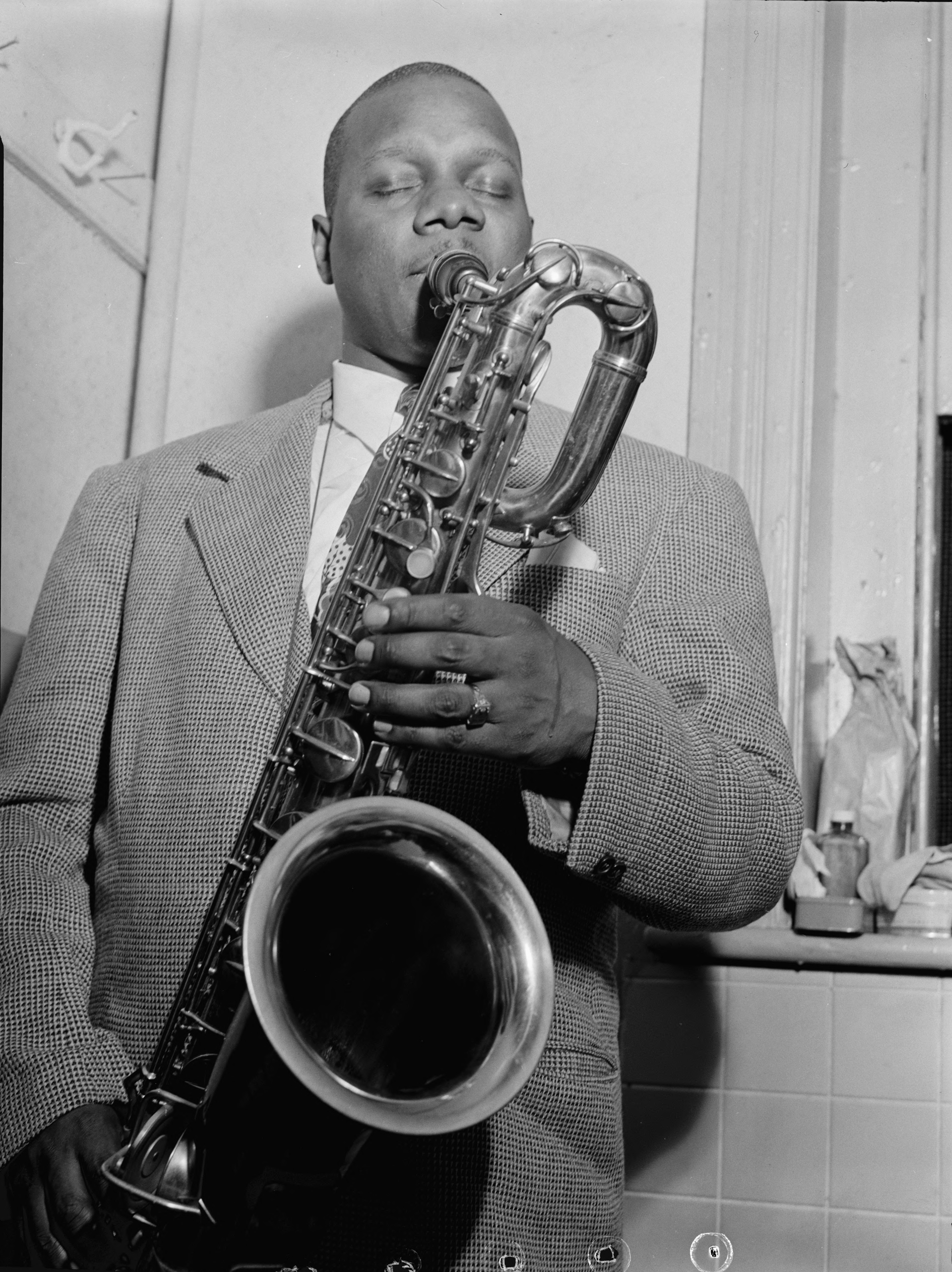
- Carney at the Turkish Embassy, Washington D.C., c. 1930s

Background information
- Born: Harry Howell Carney; April 1, 1910; Boston, Massachusetts, U.S.
- Died: October 8, 1974 (aged 64) New York City, U.S.
- Genres: Jazz
- Occupation: Musician
- Instruments: Baritone saxophone; bass clarinet; clarinet
- Years active: 1920s–1970s
- Labels: Clef; Columbia

Harry Howell Carney (April 1, 1910 – October 8, 1974) was a jazz saxophonist and clarinetist who spent over four decades as a member of the Duke Ellington Orchestra. He played a variety of instruments, but primarily performed on the baritone saxophone, being a critical influence on the instrument in jazz.

== Early life ==
Carney was born on April 1, 1910, in Boston, Massachusetts. In Boston, he grew up close to future bandmate Johnny Hodges. Carney began by playing the piano at age seven, moved to the clarinet at 14, and added the alto saxophone a year later. He first played professionally in clubs in Boston.

Early influences on Carney's playing included Buster Bailey, Sidney Bechet, and Don Murray. Carney also reported that, for his baritone saxophone playing, he "tried to make the upper register sound like Coleman Hawkins and the lower register like Adrian Rollini".

== Later life and career ==
After playing a variety of gigs in New York City, at the age of 17, Carney was invited to join the Duke Ellington band for its performances in Boston in 1927. (Note: The Cambridge Companion to Duke Ellington states that Carney joined the band in 1926 and rejoined it the following year.) He soon recorded with Ellington too, with a first session in October that year. Having established himself in the Ellington band, he stayed with it for the rest of his life. The band began a residency at the Cotton Club in New York at the end of the year.

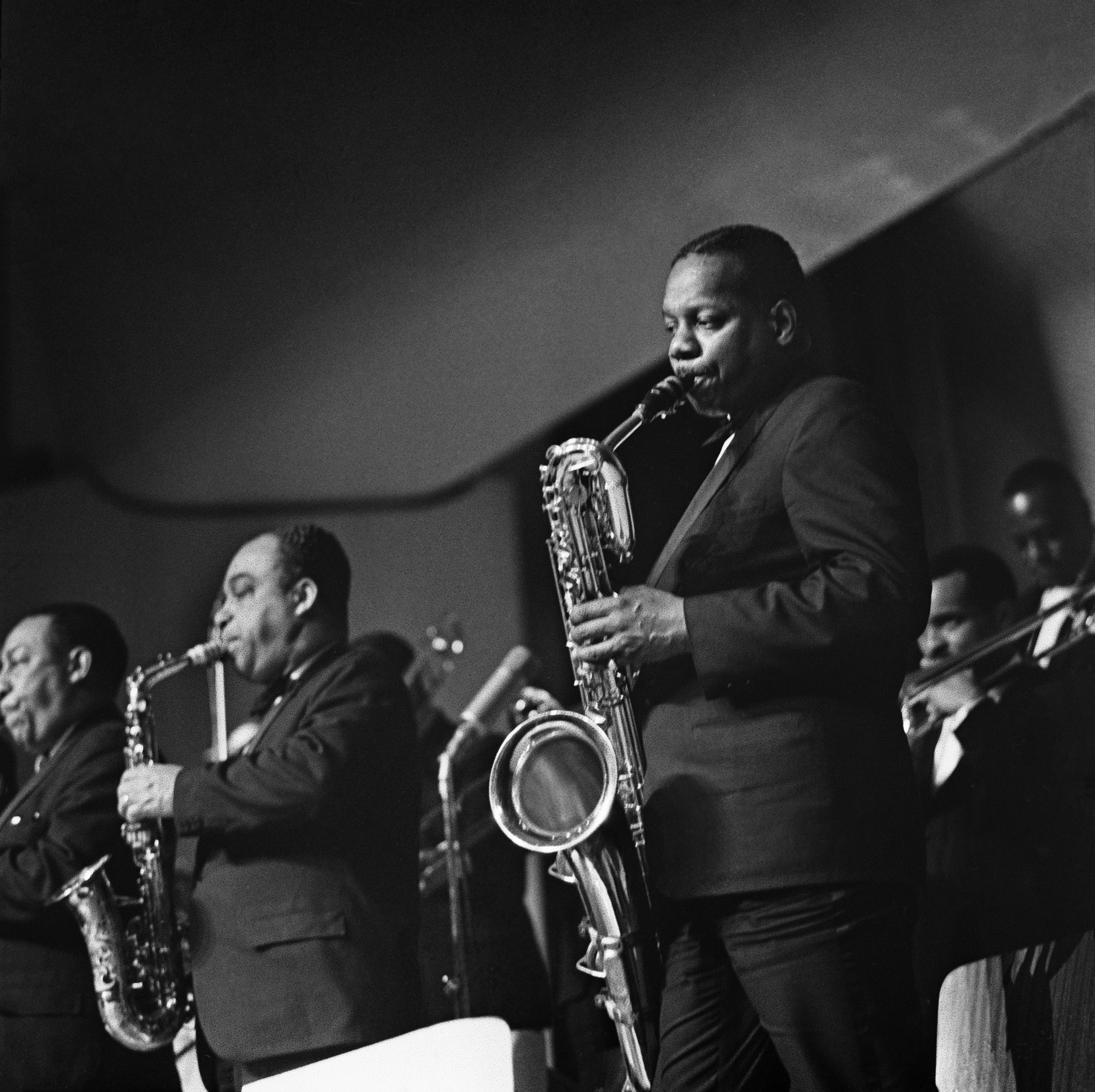
Carney with the Duke Ellington Orchestra, Helsinki, 1963. To his left are Russel Procope and Johnny Hodges (furthest).

After Ellington added more personnel in 1928, Carney's main instrument became the baritone saxophone. He was a dominant figure on the baritone in jazz, with no serious rivals on the instrument until the advent of bebop in the mid-1940s. Within the overall sound of the Ellington band, Carney's baritone was often employed to play parts of harmonies that were above the obvious low pitching of the instrument; this altered the textures of the band's sound.

In January 1938, Carney was invited to play with Benny Goodman's band at Carnegie Hall. Recordings from this event were released as The Famous 1938 Carnegie Hall Jazz Concert. Carney also took up the bass clarinet around 1944. He co-composed "Rockin' in Rhythm" and "was usually responsible for executing the bubbling clarinet solo on this tune".

In 1957, Carney was part of a band led by pianist Billy Taylor that recorded the album Taylor Made Jazz.

Carney was the longest serving player in Ellington's orchestra. On occasions when Ellington was absent or wished to make a stage entrance after the band had begun playing the first piece of a performance, Carney would serve as the band's conductor. The Ellington orchestra typically traveled on a tour bus, but Ellington himself did not; he was driven separately by Carney, a "quiet, calm presence".

Ellington wrote many showpiece features for Carney throughout their time together. In 1973, Ellington built the Third Sacred Concert around Carney's baritone saxophone.

After Ellington's 1974 death, Carney said, "Without Duke, I have nothing to live for". Carney's final recording may have been under Mercer Ellington's leadership, for the album Continuum. Four months after Ellington's death, Carney also died, on October 8, 1974, in New York.

== Influence and legacy ==
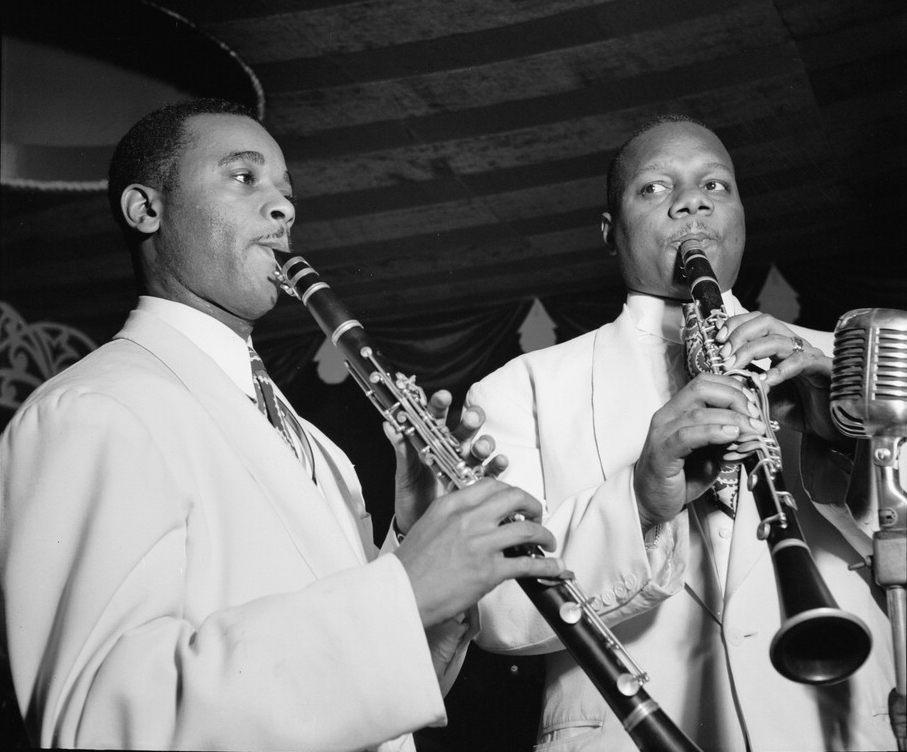
Jimmy Hamilton (left) and Harry Carney, Aquarium NYC, c. November 1946. Photo by William P. Gottlieb.

Carney was an early jazz proponent of circular breathing. He was also Hamiet Bluiett's favorite baritone player because he "never saw anybody else stop time", in reference to a concert Bluiett attended where Carney held a note during which all else went silent. Two months after Carney's death, bassist Charles Mingus recorded Sy Johnson's elegy "For Harry Carney"; the track was released on the album Changes Two.

== Discography ==
=== As leader ===
- Harry Carney with Strings (Clef, 1954; reissued by Verve as Moods for Girl and Boy)
- Rock Me Gently (Columbia, 1960; recorded as Harry Carney and the Duke's Men)

=== As sideman ===
With Rosemary Clooney

- Blue Rose (Columbia, 1956)

With Duke Ellington

With Ella Fitzgerald

- Ella Fitzgerald Sings the Duke Ellington Song Book (Verve, 1957)

With Benny Goodman

- The Famous 1938 Carnegie Hall Jazz Concert (Columbia, 1938)

With Jazz at the Philharmonic

- The Greatest Jazz Concert in the World (Pablo, 1967)

With Johnny Hodges

- Used to Be Duke (Norgran, 1954)
- Creamy (Norgran, 1955)
- Ellingtonia '56 (Norgran, 1956)
- Duke's in Bed (Verve, 1956)
- The Big Sound (Verve, 1957)
- Johnny Hodges with Billy Strayhorn and the Orchestra (Verve, 1961)
- Johnny Hodges at Sportpalast, Berlin (Pablo, 1961)
- Triple Play (RCA Victor, 1967)

With Billy Taylor

- Taylor Made Jazz (Argo, 1959)

Main sources:
