= Lawrence Brown (jazz trombonist) =

American jazz trombonist (1907–1988)

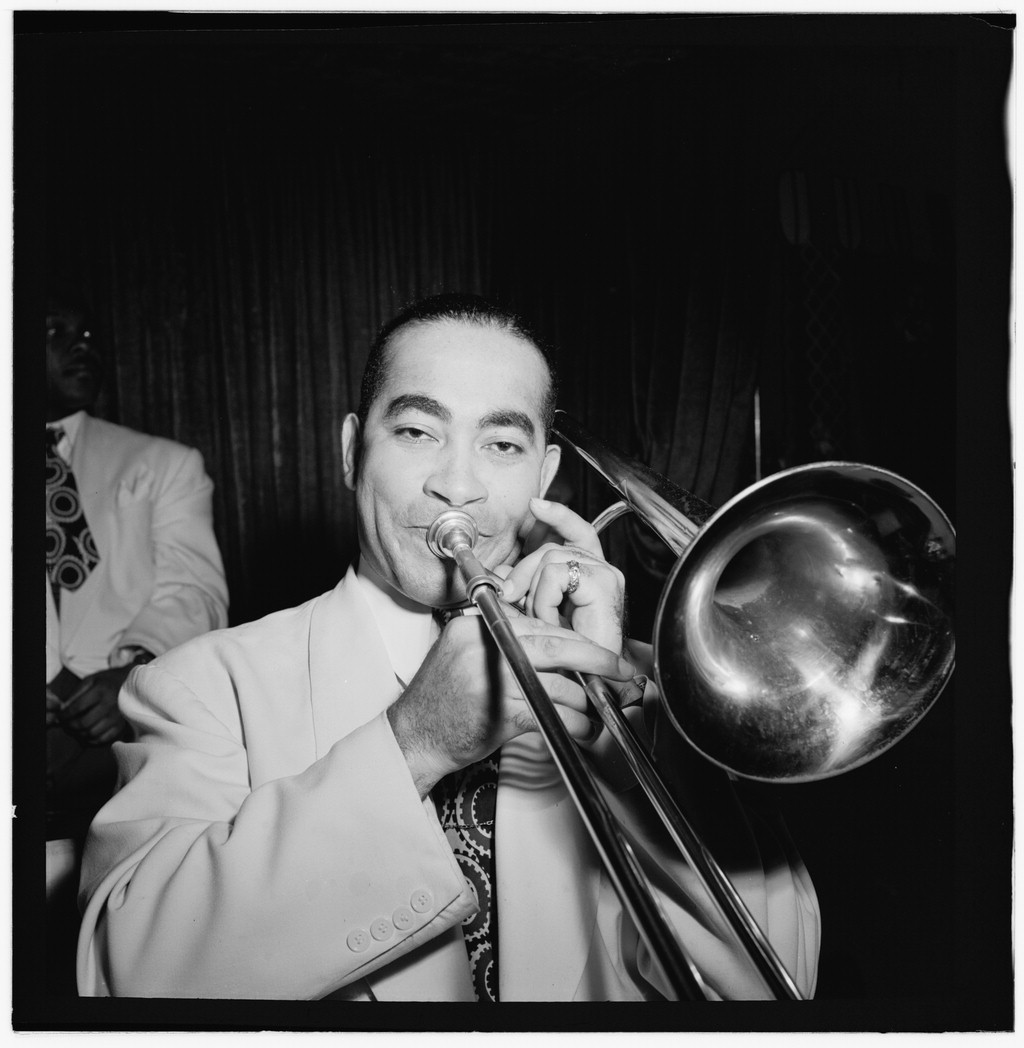
- Lawrence Brown in 1946

Background information
- Born: August 3, 1907; Lawrence, Kansas, U.S.
- Died: September 5, 1988 (aged 81) Los Angeles, California, U.S.
- Genres: Jazz
- Occupation(s): Musician, composer
- Instrument: Trombone
- Years active: 1932–1970
- Labels: Clef Records, Impulse! Records

Lawrence Brown (August 3, 1907 – September 5, 1988) was an American jazz trombonist from California best remembered for his work with the Duke Ellington orchestra. He was a session musician throughout his career, and also recorded albums under his own name.

== Early life ==
Lawrence Brown was born on August 3, 1907, in Lawrence, Kansas. When Brown was about six or seven years old in 1914 his family moved to Oakland, California. He began playing the violin at a young age, but quickly grew tired of it and turned to playing the tuba in his school's band.

Brown came from a musical background. His father was a preacher at the African Methodist Episcopal Church, where he often sang as a part of his sermons. Brown’s mother played the organ and the piano. Brown discovered the trombone while doing janitorial work at his father’s church. He stated that he wanted to replicate the sound of cello on a trombone.

== Career ==
Brown began his career with Charlie Echols and Paul Howard. In 1932, Brown joined Duke Ellington's band. His great technical command of the instrument, with its "creamy tone, neurotic vibrato and range" was featured with Ellington's band every year in compositions such as "Blue Cellophane" and "Golden Cress."

He left Ellington's band in 1951 to join a band led by former Ellington sideman Johnny Hodges, where he stayed until 1955. After leaving Hodges, Brown took a position for five years with CBS as a session player. In 1960, he rejoined Ellington and stayed with him until 1970. After leaving Ellington's band the second time at the age of 63, Brown stopped performing.

He fulfilled many roles in the Ellington Orchestra—as a balladeer, technical soloist, and section leader. His highly melodic ballad playing as well as his fast technical style inspired trombonists from Tommy Dorsey to Bill Harris.

== Personal life ==
Brown was married to Dorothea Bundrant and actress Fredi Washington. He died in Los Angeles, California, at the age of 81.

== Discography ==
=== As leader ===
- Slide Trombone Featuring Lawrence Brown (Clef, 1955)
- Inspired Abandon (Impulse!, 1965)

=== As sideman ===
With Duke Ellington

- Side by Side (Verve, 1959)
- The Nutcracker Suite (Columbia, 1960)
- Paris Blues (United Artists, 1961)
- Piano in the Background (Columbia, 1962)
- Duke Ellington Meets Coleman Hawkins (Impulse!, 1963)
- Afro-Bossa (Reprise, 1963)
- The Great Paris Concert (Atlantic, 1963 [1973])
- The Symphonic Ellington (Reprise, 1963)
- Ellington '65 (Reprise, 1964)
- Ella at Duke's Place (Verve, 1966)
- Duke Ellington's Concert of Sacred Music (RCA Victor, 1966)
- The Popular Duke Ellington (RCA Victor, 1966)
- Far East Suite (RCA Victor, 1967)
- Ella and Duke at the Cote D'Azur (Verve, 1967)
- ...And His Mother Called Him Bill (RCA 1968)
- Second Sacred Concert (Fantasy, 1968)
- Yale Concert (Fantasy, 1968 [1973])
- 70th Birthday Concert (Solid State, 1970)

With Jackie Gleason

- Jackie Gleason Presents the Torch with the Blue Flame (Capitol, 1958)
- Presents Opiate D'Amour (Capitol, 1960)
- Jackie Gleason Presents Lazy Lively Love (Capitol, 1960)

With Johnny Hodges

- Memories of Ellington (Norgran, 1954)
- Creamy (Norgran, 1955)
- Dance Bash (Norgran, 1955)
- Ellingtonia '56 (Norgran, 1956)
- In a Tender Mood (Norgran, 1956)
- Not So Dukish (Verve, 1958)
- Johnny Hodges with Billy Strayhorn and the Orchestra (Verve, 1962)
- Everybody Knows Johnny Hodges (Impulse!, 1964)
- Joe's Blues (Verve, 1965)
- Wings & Things (Verve, 1965)
- Blue Pyramid (Verve, 1966)
- Wild Bill Davis & Johnny Hodges in Atlantic City (RCA Victor, 1967)
- Triple Play (RCA Victor, 1967)

With others

- Leonard Bernstein, What Is Jazz (Columbia, 1956)
- Ruby Braff, Braff!! (Epic, 1957)
- Earl Hines, Once Upon a Time (Impulse!, 1966)
- Jo Jones, The Jo Jones Special (Vanguard, 1955)
- Frankie Ortega & Sy Oliver, 77 Sunset Strip and Other Selections (Jubilee, 1959)
- Rex Stewart, Rex Stewart and the Ellingtonians (Riverside, 1960)
- Big Joe Turner, The Boss of the Blues Sings Kansas City Jazz (Atlantic, 1956)
- Big Joe Turner, Big Joe Rides Again (Atlantic, 1960)
- Guy Warren, Themes for African Drums (RCA Victor, 1959)
- Cootie Williams & Rex Stewart, The Big Challenge (Jazztone, 1957)
- Cootie Williams & Rex Stewart, Porgy & Bess Revisited (Warner Bros., 1959)
