= Johnny Hodges =

American jazz alto saxophonist (1907–1970)

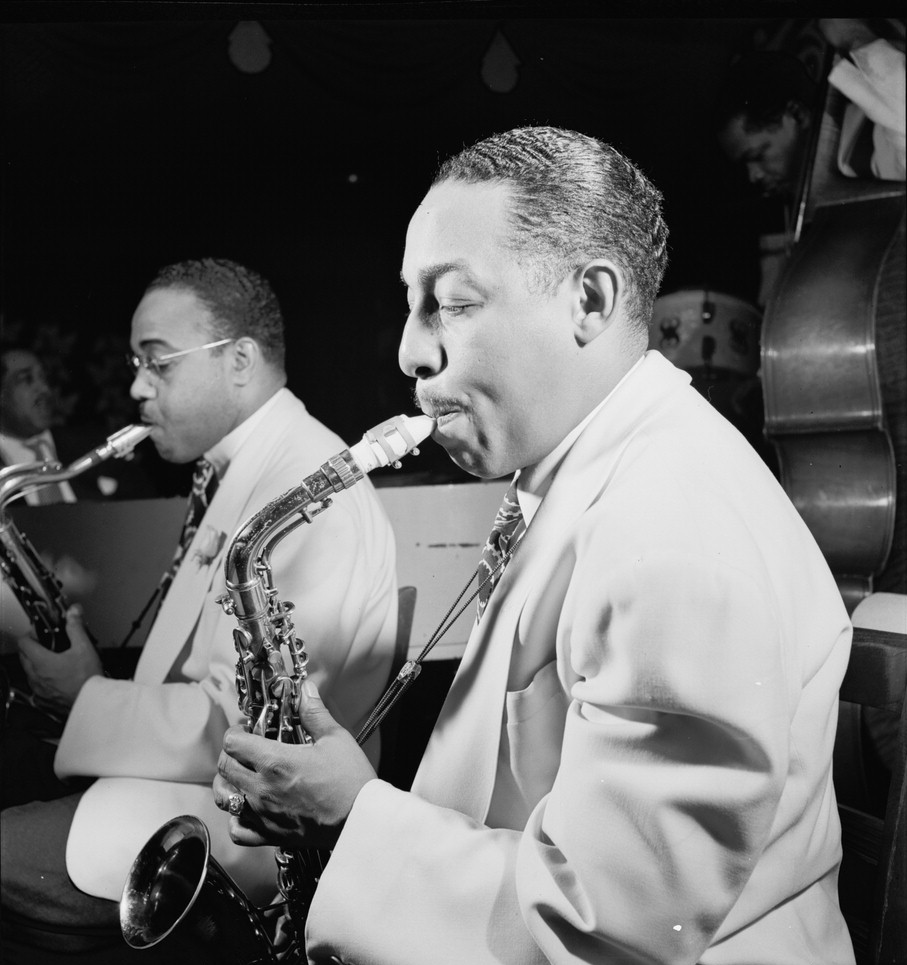
- Hodges playing a Conn 6M with Al Sears in background, 1946

Background information
- Born: John Cornelius Hodges; July 25, 1907; Cambridgeport, Cambridge, Massachusetts, U.S.
- Died: May 11, 1970 (aged 62) New York City, U.S.
- Genres: Jazz; swing
- Occupation: Musician
- Instruments: Alto saxophone; soprano saxophone; clarinet
- Years active: 1924–1970

John Cornelius "Johnny" Hodges (July 25, 1907 – May 11, 1970) was an American jazz alto saxophonist. He is best known for solo work with Duke Ellington's big band, with whom he played lead alto in the saxophone section for many years. Hodges was also featured on soprano saxophone, but refused to play soprano after 1940. Along with Benny Carter, Hodges is considered to be one of the definitive alto saxophonists of the big band era.

After beginning his career as a teenager in Boston, Hodges traveled to New York City and played with Lloyd Scott, Sidney Bechet, Luckey Roberts, and Chick Webb. When Ellington wanted to expand his band in 1928, Ellington's clarinetist, Barney Bigard, recommended Hodges. Hodges's playing became one of the identifying voices of the Ellington orchestra. From 1951 to 1955, Hodges left the Duke to lead his own band, but returned shortly before Ellington's triumphant return to prominence: the orchestra's performance at the Newport Jazz Festival in 1956.

== Biography ==
=== Early life ===
John Cornelius Hodges was born in the Cambridgeport neighborhood of Cambridge, Massachusetts, to John H. Hodges and Katie Swan Hodges, both originally from Virginia. After moving for a short period of time to North Cambridge, the family moved to Hammond Street in the South End of Boston, where he grew up with saxophonists Harry Carney (who would also become a long-term member of Duke Ellington's orchestra), Charlie Holmes, and Howard E. Johnson. His first instruments were drums and piano. While his mother was a skilled piano player, Hodges was mostly self-taught.

Once he became good enough, he played the piano at dances in private homes for $8 an evening. He had taken up the soprano saxophone by his teens. It was around this time that Hodges gained the nickname "Rabbit", which some people believe arose from his ability to win 100-yard dashes and outrun truant officers, while others, including Carney, said he was called by that name because of his rabbit-like nibbling on lettuce and tomato sandwiches.

At age 14, Hodges went with his eldest sister to see Sidney Bechet play in Jimmy Cooper's Black and White Revue in a Boston burlesque hall. She introduced him to Bechet, who asked Hodges to play something on the soprano saxophone he had brought with him. Hodges played "My Honey's Lovin' Arms" for Bechet, who was impressed with his skill and encouraged him to keep on playing, also giving him formal saxophone lessons. Hodges built a name for himself in the Boston area before moving to New York City in 1924.

=== With Duke Ellington ===
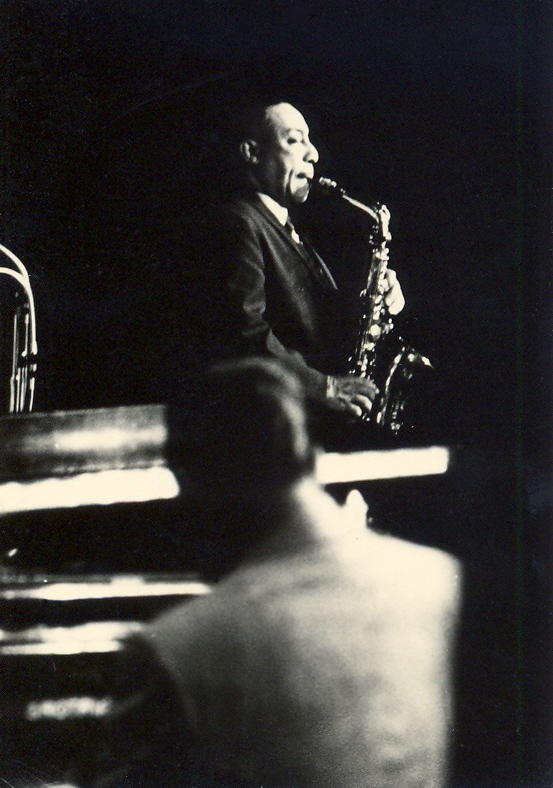
Hodges with Duke Ellington's band in Frankfurt, Germany, 1965

Hodges joined Duke Ellington's orchestra in November 1928. He was one of the prominent Ellington band members who featured in Benny Goodman's 1938 Carnegie Hall concert. Hodges was well revered, with Goodman describing him as "by far the greatest man on alto sax that I ever heard", Charlie Parker calling him "the Lily Pons of his instrument", and John Coltrane considering him his first model on the saxophone, even calling him "the world's greatest saxophone player."

Ellington's practice of writing tunes specifically for members of his orchestra resulted in the Hodges specialties "Confab with Rab", "Jeep's Blues", "Sultry Sunset", and "Hodge Podge". Other songs recorded by the Ellington Orchestra which prominently feature Hodges's smooth alto saxophone sound were "Magenta Haze", "Prelude to a Kiss", and "Haupe", from Anatomy of a Murder – also notable are the "seductive" and hip-swaying "Flirtibird", featuring the "irresistibly salacious tremor" by Hodges, "The Star-Crossed Lovers" from Ellington's Such Sweet Thunder suite, "I Got It Bad (and That Ain't Good)", "Blood Count", and "Passion Flower".

He had a pure tone and economy of melody on both the blues and ballads that won him admiration from musicians of all eras and styles, from Ben Webster and John Coltrane, who both played with him when he had his own orchestra in the 1950s, to Lawrence Welk, who featured him in an album of standards. His highly individualistic playing style, which featured the use of a wide vibrato and much sliding between slurred notes, was frequently imitated. As evidenced by the Ellington compositions named after him, he earned the nicknames "Jeep" and "Rabbit" – according to Johnny Griffin because "he looked like a rabbit, no expression on his face while he's playing all this beautiful music."

== Saxophones ==
In the 1940s, Hodges played a Conn 6M (recognizable by its octave-key mechanism being on the underside of the neck) and later on a Buescher 400 (recognizable by its V-shaped bell-brace) alto saxophone. By the end of his career in the late 1960s, Hodges was playing a Vito LeBlanc Rationale alto (serial number 2551A), an instrument with unusual key-mechanisms (providing various alternative fingerings) and tone-hole placement, which gave superior intonation. Fewer than 2,000 were ever made. Hodges's Vito saxophone was silver-plated and extensively engraved on the bell, bow, body and key-cups of the instrument.

== Death ==
Hodges's last performances were at the Imperial Room in Toronto, less than a week before his May 11, 1970, death from a heart attack, suffered during a visit to the office of a dental surgeon. His last recordings are featured on the New Orleans Suite, which was only half-finished when he died. He was married twice; he had a daughter with his first wife, Bertha Pettiford, and a son (John C. Hodges II) and a daughter (Lorna Lee) with his second wife, Edith Cue.

The loss of Hodges's sound prompted Ellington, upon learning of the musician's death from a heart attack, to lament to JET magazine: "The band will never sound the same without Johnny." In Ellington's eulogy of Hodges, he said, "Never the world's most highly animated showman or greatest stage personality, but a tone so beautiful it sometimes brought tears to the eyes—this was Johnny Hodges. This is Johnny Hodges."

== Discography ==
=== As leader or co-leader ===
- 1946: Passion Flower (RCA) with Willie Cook, Roy Eldridge, Quentin Jackson, Russell Procope, Ben Webster, Sam Woodyard
- 1951: Caravan (Prestige) with Taft Jordan, Harold Baker, Juan Tizol, Duke Ellington, Billy Strayhorn, Oscar Pettiford, Sonny Greer
- 1951–52: Castle Rock (Norgran)
- 1952: In a Tender Mood (Norgran)
- 1952–54: The Blues (Norgran)
- 1951–54: More of Johnny Hodges (Norgran)
- 1951–54: Memories of Ellington (Norgran), also released as In a Mellow Tone
- 1954: Used to Be Duke (Norgran)
- 1952–55: Dance Bash (Norgran), also released as Perdido
- 1955: Creamy (Norgran)
- 1956: Ellingtonia '56 (Norgran)
- 1956: Duke's in Bed (Verve)
- 1957: The Big Sound (Verve)
- 1958: Blues A-Plenty (Verve)
- 1958: Not So Dukish (Verve)
- 1959: Johnny Hodges and His Strings Play the Prettiest Gershwin (Verve)
- 1959: Back to Back: Duke Ellington and Johnny Hodges Play the Blues (Verve) with Duke Ellington
- 1959: Side by Side (Verve) with Duke Ellington
- 1960: A Smooth One (Verve)
- 1960: Gerry Mulligan Meets Johnny Hodges (Verve) with Gerry Mulligan
- 1961: Blue Hodge (Verve) with Wild Bill Davis
- 1961: Johnny Hodges with Billy Strayhorn and the Orchestra (Verve)
- 1961: Johnny Hodges at Sportpalast Berlin (Pablo) with Ray Nance, Lawrence Brown, Al Williams
- 1962: The Eleventh Hour (Verve) arranged and conducted by Oliver Nelson
- 1963: Buenos Aires Blues (Johnny Hodges Quintet with Lalo Schifrin on piano)
- 1963: Sandy's Gone (Verve)
- 1963: Mess of Blues (Verve) with Wild Bill Davis
- 1964: Everybody Knows Johnny Hodges (Impulse!)
- 1964: Blue Rabbit (Verve) with Wild Bill Davis
- 1965: Con-Soul & Sax (RCA Victor) with Wild Bill Davis
- 1965: Joe's Blues (Verve) with Wild Bill Davis
- 1965: Wings & Things (Verve) with Wild Bill Davis
- 1965: Inspired Abandon (Impulse!) with Lawrence Brown
- 1966: Stride Right (Verve) with Earl Hines
- 1966: Blue Pyramid (Verve) with Wild Bill Davis
- 1966: Wild Bill Davis & Johnny Hodges in Atlantic City (RCA Victor) with Wild Bill Davis
- 1966: Blue Notes (Verve)
- 1967: Triple Play (RCA Victor)
- 1967: Don't Sleep in the Subway (Verve)
- 1967: Swing's Our Thing (Verve) with Earl Hines
- 1968: Rippin' & Runnin' (Verve)
- 1970: 3 Shades of Blue (Flying Dutchman) with Leon Thomas and Oliver Nelson

=== As sideman ===
Hodges was not a member of Ellington's Orchestra before 1928, or during 1951–55, or after May 11, 1970, when Hodges died. Duke Ellington's earliest recordings date from 1924 and he died on May 24, 1974. The two men's discographies thus match almost exactly, bar exceptions listed above and in this section.

with Lawrence Brown

- Inspired Abandon (Impulse!, 1965) – billed as Lawrence Brown's All-Stars with Johnny Hodges

with Coleman Hawkins

- Hawkins! Eldridge! Hodges! Alive! At the Village Gate! (Verve, 1962)

with Joya Sherrill

- Joya Sherrill Sings Duke (20th Century Fox, 1965)

with Billy Strayhorn

- Cue for Saxophone (Felsted, 1959)

with Billy Taylor

- Taylor Made Jazz (Argo, 1959)

With Clark Terry

- Duke with a Difference (Riverside, 1957)
