= Duke Ellington discography =

This is the discography of recordings by Duke Ellington, including those nominally led by his sidemen (mainly in the 1930s and early 1940s), and his later collaborations (mainly in the 1960s) with musicians with whom Ellington had generally not previously recorded.

Below are listed 96 studio albums (including 1 box set and 5 EPs), 65 live albums (including 1 box set), and 235 compilations (including 17 box sets and 5 EPs) by the Duke.

== Discography ==
=== Studio albums ===
Year	Title	Label	Year recorded	Notes
1947	Duke Ellington Plays the Blues	RCA Victor (Note: As the long-player format didn't become a significant part of the industry until the late 1940s, Ellington's record output before 1947 consisted largely of singles, from labels such as RCA Victor, Okeh, and Brunswick. They represent the bulk of his work that has been collected in box sets, while material from other labels is scattered. The most comprehensive source for Ellington's early work are the multi-volume The Chronological Duke Ellington & His Orchestra Classics releases, although that series omits alternate takes, which can be found in other collections.)		4 x 10" 78 rpm
1947	Ellington Special	Columbia		4 x 10" 78 rpm
1948	Liberian Suite	Columbia		10-inch LP
1951	Masterpieces by Ellington	Columbia		(Note: Ellington began the 1950s with his career seemingly in decline with several musicians leaving, Lawrence Brown, Sonny Greer, and Johnny Hodges, although Brown and Hodges later rejoined. After the orchestra's appearance at the 1956 Newport Jazz Festival, with Paul Gonsalves running through 27 choruses of "Diminuendo and Crescendo in Blue", Ellington's profile revived.)
1951	Mercer Records Presents the Billy Strayhorn Trio	Mercer Records		w/ Duke Ellington and Billy Strayhorn on pianos
1952	Ellington Uptown	Columbia	1952	
1953	Premiered by Ellington	Capitol	1953	
1953	Skin Deep/The Mooche	Columbia		EP
1954	The Duke Plays Ellington	Capitol	1953	
1954	The Duke Plays Ellington – Part 1	Capitol	1953	EP
1954	Dance to the Duke!	Capitol	1954	
1955	The Duke Plays Ellington – Part 2	Capitol	1953	EP
1955	Ellington '55	Capitol	1955	
1955	Ellington Showcase	Capitol	1955	
1956	Blue Rose	Columbia	1955	with Rosemary Clooney
1956	Historically Speaking	Bethlehem		
1956	Duke Ellington Presents...	Bethlehem	1955	
1956	Originals	Pentape	1956	reel-to-reel tape
1957	A Drum Is a Woman	Columbia	1955	
1957	Such Sweet Thunder	Columbia	1955	
1957	Ella Fitzgerald Sings the Duke Ellington Song Book	Verve	1955	with Ella Fitzgerald
1958	Black, Brown and Beige	Columbia	1955	with Mahalia Jackson
1958	Ellington Indigos	Columbia	1955	
1958	The Cosmic Scene	Columbia	1955	
1959	Duke Ellington at the Bal Masque	Columbia	1955	
1959	Jazz Party	Columbia	1955	
1959	Back to Back: Duke Ellington and Johnny Hodges Play the Blues	Verve	1955	with Johnny Hodges
1959	Side by Side	Verve	1955	with Johnny Hodges
1959	Anatomy of a Murder	Columbia	1955	soundtrack album
1959	Festival Session	Columbia	1955	
1959	Ellington Moods	Sesac Recordings	1959	
1960	Blues in Orbit	Columbia		
1960	The Nutcracker Suite	Columbia		
1961	Swinging Suites by Edward E. and Edward G.	Columbia		a.k.a. Peer Gynt Suite / Suite Thursday
1961	Recording Together for the First Time	Roulette	1961	with Louis Armstrong
1961	Paris Blues	United Artists		Paris Blues soundtrack – w/ Louis Armstrong
1962	First Time! The Count Meets the Duke	Columbia		with Count Basie
1962	All American in Jazz	Columbia		
1962	Midnight in Paris	Columbia		
1962	Money Jungle	United Artists		with Charles Mingus and Max Roach
1963	Duke Ellington Meets Coleman Hawkins	Impulse!		with Coleman Hawkins
1963	Duke Ellington & John Coltrane	Impulse!	1962	with John Coltrane
1963	Duke Ellington & John Coltrane	Impulse!	1962	EP – with John Coltrane
1963	Jazz Concert	Columbia		w. Bobby Hackett
1963	Afro-Bossa	Reprise		
1963	The Great Reunion	Roulette	1961	with Louis Armstrong
1963	Piano in the Background	Columbia	1961	(Note: In the 1960s, Ellington made recordings with Louis Armstrong, Count Basie, John Coltrane, Ella Fitzgerald, Coleman Hawkins, and Frank Sinatra, among others. He continued to write and record extended suites, such as his religious "Sacred Concerts", the "Perfume Suite", and the "Latin American Suite".)
1964	The Symphonic Ellington	Reprise		
1964	Ellington '65	Reprise		
1964	Duke Ellington Plays Mary Poppins	Reprise		
1964	My People	Red Baron		
1965	Will Big Bands Ever Come Back?	Reprise		
1965	Ellington '66	Reprise		
1965	Ella at Duke's Place	Verve		with Ella Fitzgerald
1966	Serenade to Sweden	Reprise	1965	with Alice Babs
1967	Far East Suite	RCA		
1967	The Popular Duke Ellington	RCA		
1968	...And His Mother Called Him Bill	RCA	1967	
1968	Francis A. & Edward K.	Reprise	1967	with Frank Sinatra
1968	Second Sacred Concert	Prestige		studio recording, despite the title
1969	North of the Border in Canada	Decca	1967	with the Ron Collier Orchestra
1970	Orchestral Works	Decca		aka "Harlem/New World a'Coming/The Golden Broom and The Green Apple"
1970	A Poetic Commentary of His Music	Decca		limited-edition EP included with Orchestral Works
1971	New Orleans Suite	Atlantic	1970	
1972	Latin American Suite	Fantasy	1968 & 1970	
1973	This One's for Blanton!	Pablo		with Ray Brown
1973	It Don't Mean a Thing If It Ain't Got That Swing	Flying Dutchman		with Teresa Brewer
1974	Recollections of the Big Band Era	Atlantic	1962–63	recorded for Reprise
1974	Duke's Big 4	Pablo		
Posthumous albums
1974	The Pianist	Fantasy	1966 & 1970	
1975	The Afro-Eurasian Eclipse	Fantasy	1971	
1975	This One's For Blanton	Pablo Records	1972	w/ Ray Brown
1976	Duke Ellington's Jazz Violin Session	Atlantic	1963	
1976	The Ellington Suites	Pablo	1959–72	
1977	The Intimate Ellington	Pablo	1969–71	
1979	Unknown Session	Columbia	1960	
1979	Up in Duke's Workshop	Pablo	1969–72	
1985	Featuring Paul Gonsalves	Fantasy	1962	
1986	The Intimacy of the Blues	Fantasy	1967–70	
1987	Studio Sessions, Chicago 1956	LMR	1956	The Private Sessions Volume One
1987	Dance Concerts, California 1958	LMR	1958	The Private Sessions Volume Two
1987	Studio Sessions, New York, 1962	LMR	1962	The Private Collection Volume Three
1987	Studio Sessions New York 1963	LMR	1963	The Private Collection Volume Four
1987	The Suites, New York 1968 & 1970	LMR	1968, 1970	The Private Collection Volume Five
1987	The Private Collection	LMR		The first five CDs from The Private Collection series in a box set
1987	Dance Dates, California 1958	LMR	1958	The Private Sessions Volume Six
1987	Studio Sessions 1957 & 1962	LMR	1957, 1962	The Private Collection Volume Seven
1987	Studio Sessions, 1957, 1965, 1966, 1967, San Francisco, Chicago, New York	LMR	1957, 1965–1967	The Private Collection Volume Eight
1987	Studio Sessions New York, 1968	LMR	1968	The Private Collection Volume Nine
1987	Studio Sessions New York & Chicago, 1965, 1966 & 1971	LMR	1965–1967, 1971	The Private Collection Volume Ten
1989	The Duke Ellington Orchestra	Echo Jazz		
1991	Ellington: Never Before Released Recordings (1965-1972)	Jazz Heritage		
1992	Cool Rock	LaserLight Digital		
1999	Duke's Joint	Buddha Records, RCA, BMG	1943, 1945	
2004	The Jaywalker	Storyville	1966–1967	
2016	Assault on a Queen	Dragon's Domain Records	1966	from the movie Assault on a Queen

=== Live albums ===
Year	Title	Label	Year recorded	Notes
1946	Black, Brown, and Beige	Victor	1943	2 × 12" 78 rpm
1954	The Seattle Concert	RCA Victor	1952	
1956	Duke Ellington and the Buck Clayton All-Stars at Newport	Columbia	1956.07.06	Reached number 14 in the United States
1956	Ellington at Newport	Columbia	1956.07.07	
1958	Newport 1958	Columbia	1958.07	live concert with studio work, later full concert released as Live at Newport 1958
1959	Live at the Blue Note	Roulette	1959	
1965	Concert in the Virgin Islands	Reprise	1965.03	
1966	The Duke at Tanglewood	RCA Victor	1965.12	with the Boston Pops Orchestra conducted by Arthur Fiedler
1966	A Concert of Sacred Music from Grace Cathedral	Status	1965.07	See: Sacred Concert (Ellington)
1967	Soul Call	Verve	1966.07	
1967	Ella and Duke at the Cote D'Azur	Verve	1966.06	with Ella Fitzgerald
1970	70th Birthday Concert	Solid State	1969	
1970	70th Birthday Concert Highlights	Liberty Records, Inc.	1969	
1972	Togo Brava Suite	United Artists	1971	
1973	Jazz at the Plaza Vol. II	Columbia	1958.09	
1973	The Great Paris Concert	Atlantic	1963.02.01	
1973	Yale Concert	Fantasy	1968	
1973	Cotton Club-1938, Volume One, If Dreams Come True	Jazz Archives	1938	
Posthumous live albums
1975	The Greatest Jazz Concert in the World	Pablo	1967	Various artists
1975	Third Sacred Concert	RCA	1973.10	
1975	Eastbourne Performance	RCA	1973.12	
1975	Volume Two, June 1951	Stardust Records	1951	
1975	Volume Three, April 1953	Stardust Records	1953	
1977	The Carnegie Hall Concerts: December 1947	Prestige	1947	
1977	The Carnegie Hall Concerts: January 1943	Prestige	1943	
1977	The Carnegie Hall Concerts: December 1944	Prestige	1944	
1977	The Carnegie Hall Concerts: January 1946	Prestige	1946	
1978	At Fargo 1940 Live	Book-Of-The-Month Records	1940	3xLP box set
1979	One Night Stand with Duke Ellington at the Club Zanzibar	Joyce	1948	
1979	Duke Ellington's Jubilee	Joyce	1948-49	
1980	West Coast Tour	Jazz Bird	1951	
1982	Sophisticated Duke	Intermedia	1943	
1983	All Star Road Band	Doctor Jazz	1957	
1984	The Stockholm Concert, 1966	Pablo	1966.02	with Ella Fitzgerald
1985	All Star Road Band Volume 2	Doctor Jazz	1964	
1985	S.R.O.	Lester Recording Catalog	1961	
1985	The 1953 Pasadena Concert	GNP Crescendo		
1985	Ellington, James	Lester Recording Catalog		
1986	In the Uncommon Market	Pablo	1963.02.06–1966	
1987	The 1954 Los Angeles Concert	GNP Crescendo		
1989	Duke Ellington Live! at the Newport Jazz Festival '59	EmArcy		
1989	Live at the 1956 Stratford Festival	Music & Arts		
1991	Hot Summer Dance	Red Baron	1960	
1993	Duke Ellington, His Orchestra and Friends at the First Annual Connecticut Jazz Festival, July 28, 1956	IAJRC	1956	
1993	The Great London Concerts	MusicMasters Jazz	1963-64	
1994	The Great Chicago Concerts	MusicMasters Jazz	1946	
1995	Live at the Whitney	Impulse!	1972	
1995	New York Concerts	MusicMasters Jazz	1964	
1995	Meadowbrook to Manhattan	Black Label, Inc.	1952	
1996	Cornell University	MusicMasters Jazz	1964	
1996	Cornell University	MusicMasters Jazz	1964	
1996	Live in Mexico	QED	1968	
1999	Duke Ellington Hamilton, Ontario Canada, Monday, Feb. 8, 1954	Music & Arts	1954	
1999	1969 All-Star White House Tribute	Blue Note		
2002	Duke Ellington at the Alhambra	Pablo	1958.10	
2002	Live And Rare	Bluebird	1965-73	
2003	Rugged Jungle	Squatty Roo Records	1972-73	
2008	Giants of the Big Band Era: "On the Air"	Acrobat Music Group Ltd.	1937, 1940	
2008	The Great Concerts London & New York 1963 - 1964	Nimbus Records	1963-1964	
2014	Live At Cabaret L'Alcazar	Squatty Roo Records	1969	
2014	Mara Gold	Squatty Roo Records	1967	
2015	Second Sacred Concert Live	Squatty Roo Records	1969	
2017	Newport To Paris (1969)	Squatty Roo Records	1969	
2017	Live in Poland (1971)	Squatty Roo Records	1971	
2018	The Armory Concert	Squatty Roo Records	1955	

=== Compilations ===
Listed here are all compilations released during Ellington's lifetime, in addition to all significant compilations, excluding the aforementioned box sets.

Year	Title	Label	Date recorded	Notes
1940	The Duke	Columbia		
1941	Hot Piano	RCA Victor	1941	4 x 10" 78 rpm; w/ Earl Hines, Fats Waller, and Jelly Roll Morton - the latter's additions were from 1929
1943	A Duke Ellington Panorama	Victor	1927–1940	4 x 78 RPM
1943	Ellingtonia, Vol. One	Brunswick	1927–1931	4 × 78 RPM
1944	Ellingtonia, Vol. Two	Brunswick	1928–1931	4 × 78 RPM
1949	Mood Ellington	Columbia		10-inch LP
1952	This is Duke Ellington	RCA Victor	1940	10-inch LP
1952	Duke Ellington's Greatest	RCA Victor	1945	EP
1953	Duke Ellington Plays	Royale	1946	EP
1953	ASCAP Award Winners	Columbia		EP
1954	The Music Of Duke Ellington Played By Duke Ellington	Columbia		
1955	Duo	RCA Victor	1940	EP - w/ Jimmy Blanton
1955	The Duke and His Men	RCA Victor	1941-42	
1955	Here's the Duke	Columbia		
1955	Duke's Mixture	Columbia		
1955	Blue Light	Columbia	1934–1939	
1955	Early Recordings: Duke Ellington, Volume 1	"X"		
1956	In a Mellotone	RCA Victor	1940–1942	
1956	Duke Ellington Plays	Allegro	1946	a 10-inch LP version was available in 1952 and had six fewer selections
1957	The Birth of Big Band Jazz	Riverside Records	1926	the Fletcher Henderson tracks are from 1923–28
1958	Caravan	RCA Victor	1943, 1945	EP
1958	The Royal Concert of Duke Ellington and His Famous Orchestra Volume 1	AAMCO Records		
1959	The Duke's D.J. Special	Fresh Sound Records		
1959	The Royal Concert of Duke Ellington and His Famous Orchestra Volume 2	AAMCO Records		
1958	Swingin' High with Ellington and Basie	Omegatape		w/ Count Basie
1959	At the Cotton Club	RCA Camden	1929-31	
1961	The Best of Duke Ellington and His Famous Orchestra	Capitol	1953-55	
1961	Music of Duke Ellington and Others	Spin-O-Rama		
1961	The Indispensable Duke Ellington	RCA Victor		
1961	Best of Duke Ellington/The Hits of Woody Herman	Capitol Records		w/ Woody Herman
1963	Hail to the Duke	Camay Records		
1963	Three of a Kind (3 Top Stars of Jazz Dance Bands)	Camay Records		w/ Woody Herman and Bunny Berigan
1963	Great Times!	Riverside		with Billy Strayhorn
1964	In a Magenta Haze	Tops Records		
1964	Daybreak Express	RCA Victor	1931-34	
1964	Duke Ellington Meets Leonard Feather	Sutton		w/ Leonard Feather - album is split between the two
1965	Jumpin' Punkins	RCA Victor	1940–1941	
1967	Duke Ellington's Greatest Hits	Reprise Records		
1967	Johnny Come Lately	RCA Victor		
1967	The Far East Suite/The Popular Duke Ellington	RCA Victor		
1967	Duke Ellington "The Beginning" Vol. 1 (1926-1928)	Decca	1926-1928	
1968	The Early Duke Ellington	Everest Records Archive Of Folk & Jazz Music		
1968	Duke Ellington's Greatest Hits	Columbia		
1969	In My Solitude	Harmony		
1969	Flaming Youth	RCA Victor	1927-29	
1969	The Best of Duke Ellington	Sunset Records		
1970	Duke's Rare and Unissued Masters	For Discriminate Collector	1926-1939	
1970	Duke Ellington "Rockin' In Rhythm" Vol. 3 (1929-1931)	Decca	1929-1931	
1970	Duke Ellington	UpFront Records	1937 & 1940	
1971	This is Duke Ellington	RCA Victor		
1972	The Count Meets the Duke	Columbia House		w/ Count Basie
1973	Ellingtonia Reevaluations: The Impulse Years	Impulse!		
1973	Blues Summit	Verve Records	1958-59	w/ Johnny Hodges
1973	Take the A Train	RCA		
1973	Duke Ellington Presents Ivie Anderson	Columbia		w/ Ivie Anderson
1973	The Golden Duke	Prestige		
Posthumous compilations
1974	Immortal Legend Volume II - The Early Years	Birchwood		
1974	Social Security Presents the Genius of Duke (A New Series of 15-Minute Radio Shows Starring Duke Ellington and His Music)	U.S. Department Of Health, Education, And Welfare		2xLP originally, but a 7xLP box set by 1975
1974	The World Of Duke Ellington	Columbia	1947	
1974	We Love You Madly	Pickwick		
1974	Love You Madly	Vee Jay Records	1950s	
1974	The Legendary Duke Ellington In Memoriam	Olympic Records		
1975	Duke Ellington 1899-1974	Epitaph		
1975	The World Of Duke Ellington Volume 2	Columbia		
1976	Duke Ellington 1938	Smithsonian Collection, Columbia Special Products		later reissued as "Braggin' In Brass: The Immortal 1938 Year"
1976	The World Of Duke Ellington Volume 3	Columbia		
1977	1899-1974	M.F. Productions, Inc.		5xLP box set
1977	Duke Ellington Orchestra	Gramercy 5		
1977	Popular Hits, Ballets, Extended Works and Jazz Performances	Fox American		5xLP box set
1977	Duke Ellington 1939	Smithsonian Collection, Columbia Special Products		
1978	The Many Moods of Duke Ellington	Camden, Quintessence Jazz Series		
1978	Plays Duke Ellington	Quintessence		
1978	Duke Ellington's Band Shorts	Biograph	1929, 1933, 1935	
1978	Duke Ellington 1940	Smithsonian Collection, RCA Special Products		
1978	The Great Tenor Encounters	Impulse!, ABC Records, ABC Impulse!	w/ Coleman Hawkins & John Coltrane	
1978	The Immortal Duke Ellington Vol. 1 of 3	Hall of Fame	1943	
1978	The Immortal Duke Ellington Vol. 3 of 3	Hall of Fame	1943	
1979	An Explosion of Genius 1938-1940	Columbia Special Products		6xLP box set
1979	Jubilation	Teller House		w/ Paul Anka
1979	Satin Doll	Koala		
1979	Take the "A" Train	Quintessence		
1979	The Collector's Ellington	The Franklin Mint Record Society	1928-61	
1979	The Count Meets the Duke	Teller House		w/ Count Basie
1979	The Royal Court of Swing	Realm Records		w/ Count Basie
1979	Fats, Louis, Duke & Ella	Teller House Inc.		w/ Fats Waller, Louis Armstrong, and Ella Fitzgerald
1979	Count, Duke & Hamp	Teller House Inc.		w/ Count Basie and Lionel Hampton
1980	Giants of Jazz - Duke Ellington	Time Life Records	1926-56	3xLP box set - came with a 48-page booklet
1980	The Best of Duke Ellington	Pablo Records		
1980	Classic Ellington	Picc-A-Dilly		
1980	20 Golden Pieces of Duke Ellington	Bulldog Records		
1981	Sophisticated Ellington	RCA	late '20s to mid-'40s, 1966	
1981	Duke Ellington 1941	Smithsonian Collection, RCA Special Products		
1982	Heads of State	Accord		w/ Count Basie
1982	The Girl's Suite and The Perfume Suite	Columbia	1957 & 1961	
1982	Lullaby of Birdland	Intermedia	1940s-early '50s	
1982	Original Recordings by Duke Ellington	RCA, Pair Records		
1982	Forever	HSRD		
1982	Do Nothing Till You Hear From Me	Intermedia		
1982	Duke Ellington	CBS Special Products		
1982	Lena & the Duke	RCA Special Products		w/ Lena Horne
1983	Big Bands: Duke Ellington	Time Life Music		2xLP box set
1983	The Studio Series, Volume Six - 1930-1958	Up-To-Date Records	1930-1958	
1983	Royalty	Allegiance	1946	
1983	Black Jazz And Blues : The First Sound Films	Sandy Hook Records		w/ Bessie Smith and Cab Calloway
1983	Great Jazz Classics	The Franklin Mint Record Society		various artists, though 3/4 of the tracks were from Ellington - 4xLP box set
1983	Brunswick-Vocalion Rarities	MCA Records		
1984	Rockin' In Rhythm	AVI Records		
1984	Prime Cuts	ERA Records		
1984	The Best of Duke Ellington	CBS Special Products		
1984	Black & Tan	CBS Special Products		w/ Louis Armstrong
1985	Volume One - 1943	Circle		
1985	Happy Reunion	Sony	1958	two sessions from 1958
1985	New Mood Indigo	Signature	1962, 1964, 1966	
1985	Louis Armstrong • Duke Ellington • Ella Fitzgerald • Ray Charles	LRC Jazz Classics		w/ Louis Armstrong, Ella Fitzgerald, and Ray Charles
1985	Stardust	Golden Circle, Inc.		
1985	The Best of the Big Bands: Caravan	Starday King		
1985	Duke Vol.1	Creative Sounds Limited		
1985	Duke Vol.2	Creative Sounds Limited		
1985	Basie, Williams, Ellington	LRC Jazz Classics		w/ Count Basie and Joe Williams
1986	The Blanton–Webster Band	RCA/Bluebird	1940–1942	
1987	The Best of Duke Ellington	CBS Special Products	1956-58, 1962, 1964	
1987	Big Band	Big Band		
1988	The Feeling of Jazz	1201 Music		
1988	Swing Back with Duke Ellington	Just For Records, B&C Records		
1989	Recollections of the Big Band Era	Atlantic Jazz	1962-63	
1989	The Best of Duke Ellington	Capitol Special Markets		
1989	Cotton Club Days	LaserLight Digital		w/ Lena Horne and Cab Calloway
1989	Braggin' in Brass: The Immortal 1938 Year	CBS, Portrait	1938	
1990	Greatest Hits	CBS Special Products		
1990	Sophisticated Lady	Golden Treasure		
1990	The Great American Composers: Duke Ellington	Columbia Music Collection		
1990	Three Suites	Columbia		
1990	Solos, Duets and Trios	Bluebird	1932-67	
1991	Take the 'A' Train	Four Star		
1991	The Duke's Men: Small Groups: Vol. 1	Columbia, Legacy		
1991	The Essence Of Duke Ellington	Columbia, Legacy		
1991	Reminiscing in Tempo	Columbia, Legacy		
1991	Mood Indigo	Pro-Arte Digital		
1991	Jumpin'	Elite		
1991	The Jazz Collector Edition	LaserLight Digital		
1991	The OKeh Ellington	Columbia	1927-30	
1992	Duke Ellington!	Highland Music, Inc.		
1992	Things Ain't What They Used to Be	Lester Recording Catalog	1966, 1969	
1992	Best of Duke Ellington	Curb Records		
1992	Sophisticated Lady	Bluebird		
1992	The World of Duke Ellington: Take the 'A' Train	Trace		
1992	The World of Duke Ellington: Perdido	Trace		
1992	S.R.O. + Thing Ain't What They Used To Be	Lester Recording Catalog		
1993	Big Band Hits of Duke Ellington	MAC/VSOP		
1993	The Duke's Men: Small Groups: Volume 2 (1938-1939)	Columbia, Legacy		
1993	The Indispensable Duke Ellington And The Small Groups - Vol. 9/10 (1940-1946)	Jazz Tribune		
1993	The Indispensable Duke Ellington Vol. 11/12 (1944-1946)	Jazz Tribune		
1993	Ella & Duke	Verve Records		w/ Ella Fitzgerald
1993	Duke Ellington's Incidental Music for Shakespeare's Play Timon of Athens	Varèse Sarabande		adapted by Stanley Silverman; posthumous recordings of previously unreleased compositions
1993	Sophisticated Lady	CSI		
1994	Verve Jazz Masters 4	Verve Records	1957-66	
1994	Early Ellington - The Complete Brunswick and Vocalion Recordings of Duke Ellington, 1926-1931	Decca Jazz		
1994	16 Most Requested Songs	Columbia, Legacy		
1994	Beyond Category: The Musical Genius of Duke Ellington	RCA Special Products		2xCD box set
1994	Satin Doll	Eclipse Music Group		
1995	Duke Ellington and His Great Vocalists	Columbia, Legacy		
1995	The Best of Duke Ellington	Capitol Jazz	1953-55	
1995	The Complete Capitol Recordings of Duke Ellington	Mosaic Records	1953-55	5xCD/8xLP box set
1996	This Is Jazz 7	Columbia, Legacy	1927-59	
1996	Greatest Hits	RCA Victor	1928-67	
1996	More Greatest Hits	RCA Victor	1928-67	
1996	The Best of Early Ellington	Decca Jazz		
1996	Sophisticated Lady	Victor Jazz		
1996	Duke Ellington	Penny		
1996	American Legends	LaserLight Digital		
1996	Jazz After Dark: Great Songs	Public Music Inc		
1996	Great Songs	Jazz After Dark		
1996	Duke Ellington	Eclipse Music Group, Inc.		
1997	Jazz Profile: Duke Ellington	Blue Note		
1997	The Encore Collection	BMG Special Products		
1997	A Musical Contribution by America's Best for Our Armed Forces Overseas	V Disc, Collectors' Choice Music		
1998	The Private Collection (1956–1971)	Saja	1956-71	10-CD box set
1998	The Ella Fitzgerald and Duke Ellington Côte D'Azur Concerts on Verve	Verve Records	1966	8xCD box set
1998	Swingin'	BCI Music		
1998	Priceless Jazz Collection	GRP		
1998	Duke Ellington Plays Standards	Columbia Jazz, Legacy		
1998	Battle of the Bands - Duke Ellington vs. Count Basie	BMG Classics, RCA Victor	1940, 1947	
1999	The Complete Sessions	Classic Records	1961	w/ Louis Armstrong; combines "Recording Together for the First Time" and "The Great Reunion"
1999	Jazziz Magazine On-Disc - April 1999 Ellington	Jazziz	1961	
1999	Sir Duke & Friends	Ottenheimer Creations		
1999	The Reprise Studio Recordings	Mosaic Records	1962-65	5xCD box set
1999	The Best of the Duke Ellington Centennial Edition: The Complete RCA Victor Recordings (1927-1973)	RCA Victor, BMG Classics	1927-1973	
1999	The Duke Ellington Centennial Edition: The Complete RCA Victor Recordings (1927-1973)	RCA Victor	1927-1973	24xCD box set
1999	Centenary Celebration 1999 - Volume 1	CDS Records Limited		
1999	Centenary Celebration 1999 - Volume 2	CDS Records Limited		
1999	Centenary Celebration 1999 - Volume 3	Louisiana Red Hot Records		
1999	The Duke - The Columbia Years 1927-1962	Columbia, Legacy	1927-1962	came with a hardback book
1999	Private Collection Volume I	J-Bird Records		
1999	Private Collection Volume II	J-Bird Records		
1999	Cocktail Hour	Columbia River Entertainment Group, Allegro Corporation		
1999	The Duke Ellington Legacy	Varèse Sarabande	1956-68	
1999	Big Band Fever	Madacy Entertainment	1956-68	3xCD box set - w/ Count Basie and Tommy Dorsey
2000	The Making of the Great Summit	Roulette Jazz	1961	w/ Louis Armstrong
2000	Ken Burns Jazz: Duke Ellington	Legacy, Columbia	1927-60	
2000	The Best of the Complete RCA Victor Mid-Forties Recordings (1944-1946)	RCA Victor, BMG Classics	1944-1946	
2000	The Very Best of Duke Ellington	RCA Victor, BMG Classics		
2000	Ken Burns Jazz	Columbia, Legacy		3-CD box set - w/ Louis Armstrong and Benny Goodman
2000	Stew Burp: Small Groups and Big Band 1936-1939	R/V Records	1936-1939	
2000	Blues And Ballads	Varèse Sarabande		
2000	Highlights from The Duke Ellington Centennial Edition	RCA Victor, BMG Entertainment		
2000	The Complete RCA Victor Mid-Forties Recordings (1944-1946)	RCA Victor	1944-1946	
2000	Falling in Love with Duke Ellington	RCA Victor	1944-1946	
2000	The Great Summit: Complete Sessions	Roulette Jazz	1961	w/ Louis Armstrong - combines "Recording Together for the First Time", "The Great Reunion", and "The Making of the Great Summit"
2000	The Best of the Big Bands Volume I	St. Clair		w/ Count Basie
2001	Love Songs	Columbia, Legacy	1947-61	
2001	The Best of Duke Ellington/New Mood Indigo	Collectables, Sony Music		
2002	Duke Ellington's Finest Hour	Verve Records	1926-72	
2002	In The Mood with Duke Ellington	Sony Music Custom Marketing Group		
2002	Greatest Hits	Collectables		
2002	12 Classics	Varèse Sarabande		
2002	The Strayhorn Touch	Collectables, BMG Special Products		
2003	Never No Lament: The Blanton–Webster Band	Bluebird	1940–1942	from the Centennial set of 1999
2003	The Bubber Miley Era: 1924-1929	Jazz Legends	1924-1929	
2004	The Centennial Collection	Bluebird		included a DVD
2004	Blue Harlem	Synergy Entertainment		
2005	The Essential Duke Ellington	Columbia, Legacy		
2005	A Sophisticated Genius	American Legends		
2006	The Complete 1936-1940 Variety, Vocalion and Okeh Small Group Sessions	Mosaic Records	1936-1940	7xCD box set
2007	Duke's Mixture/At the Bal Masque	Collectables, Sony BMG		
2008	Best of Duke Ellington	X5 Music Group, Sony		26xFile (MP3)
2008	The Best of Duke Ellington	Sony BMG Music Entertainment, Columbia, RCA		
2008	Super Hits	Sony BMG Music Entertainment		
2010	Playlist: The Very Best of Duke Ellington	Masterworks Jazz, Legacy		
2013	In Grand Company	Columbia, Legacy		various artists paired with Ellington
2014	Will Big Bands Ever Come Back?/Recollections of the Big Band Era	American Jazz Classics		
2014	Duke Ellington: The Original Recordings That Inspired the Broadway Hit After Midnight Broadway's Cotton Club Musical	Legacy		
2016	The Duke Box 2	1952–1972	Storyville	7-CD/1-DVD box set
2019	The Washingtonians	Squatty Roo Records	1920s	
2020	1928-1962 - The Essential Works	Diggers Factory	1928-1962	

=== Session appearances ===
- The Complete Porgy and Bess (1956) (Bethlehem) – limited involvement of "Duke Ellington and his Famous Orchestra"

=== Hit records ===
Year	Single	Chart positions			Footnotes
Year	Single	US	US R&B	UK	Footnotes
1927	"East St. Louis Toodle-Oo"	10			(Note: During the 1920s and 1930s, Ellington and his band recorded for almost every label (BluDisc, Pathé, Perfect, Victor, Brunswick, Columbia Records, Okeh, Vocalion, Cameo, Romeo, Lincoln, Banner, Domino, Jewel, and Hit of the Week).)
1928	"Black and Tan Fantasy"	15			
1928	"Creole Love Call"	19			
1928	"Doin' the New Low Down"	20			
1928	"Diga Diga Doo"	17			
1928	"The Mooche"	16			
1930	"Three Little Words"	1			
1930	"Ring Dem Bells"	17			
1931	"Blue Again"	12			
1931	"Mood Indigo"	3			
1931	"Rockin' in Rhythm"	19			
1931	"Creole Rhapsody Parts 1 & 2"	18			
1931	"Limehouse Blues"	13			
1932	"It Don't Mean a Thing (If It Ain't Got That Swing)"	6			
1932	"Creole Rhapsody" (new version)	19			
1932	"Rose Room (in Sunny Roseland)"	15			
1932	"Moon over Dixie"	14			
1932	"Blue Ramble"	16			
1933	"Drop Me Off in Harlem"	17			
1933	"Sophisticated Lady"	3			
1933	"Stormy Weather"	4			
1933	"I'm Satisfied"	11			
1933	"In the Shade of the Old Apple Tree"	13			
1934	"Daybreak Express"	20			
1934	"Cocktails for Two"	1			
1934	"Moon Glow"	2			
1934	"Solitude"	2			
1934	"Saddest Tale"	9			
1935	"Merry-Go-Round"	6			
1935	"In a Sentimental Mood"	14			
1935	"Accent on Youth"	6			
1935	"Cotton"	4			
1936	"Isn't Love the Strangest Thing?"	12			
1936	"Love Is Like a Cigarette"	8			
1936	"Clarinet Lament"	12			
1936	"Echoes of Harlem"	19			
1936	"Oh Babe! Maybe Someday"	8			
1936	"Jazz Lips"	20			
1936	"Yearning for Love"	16			
1937	"The New East St. Louis Toodle-Oo"	16			
1937	"There's a Lull in My Life"	12			
1937	"Scattin' at the Kit Kat"	9			
1937	"Caravan"	4			
1937	"Azure"	13			
1937	"All God's Chillun Got Rhythm"	14			
1938	"Harmony in Harlem"	15			
1938	"If You Were in My Place (What Would You Do?)"	10			
1938	"I Let a Song Go Out of My Heart"	1			
1938	"The Gal from Joe's"	20			
1938	"Lambeth Walk"	7			
1938	"Prelude to a Kiss"	18			
1940	"You, You, Darlin'"	28			(Note: By the 1940s, Ellington's recordings featuring Jimmy Blanton and Ben Webster, garnered praise of his work as being "the best Ellington", according to critic Bob Blumenthal.)
1940	"Ko Ko"	25			
1940	"At a Dixie Roadside Diner"	27			
1940	"Sepia Panorama"	24			
1941	"Flamingo"	11			
1941	"Take the 'A' Train"	11			
1941	"I Got It Bad and That Ain't Good"	13			
1942	"Hayfoot, Strawfoot"		10		(Note: Activity in the commercial recording industry was restricted during the 1942–1944 musicians' strike which including a recording ban, but Ellington did make annual visits to Carnegie Hall. In the January 1943 concert, Ellington introduced his first extended suite, "Black, Brown and Beige".)
1943	"Don't Get Around Much Anymore"	8	1		
1943	"Perdido"	21			
1943	"Take the 'A' Train" (re-entry)	19			
1943	"Bojangles"	19			
1943	"A Slip of the Lip"	19	1		
1943	"Sentimental Lady"	19	1		
1944	"Do Nothin' till You Hear from Me"	10	1		
1944	"Main Stem"	23	1		
1944	"My Little Brown Book"		4		
1944	"Someone"		7		
1944	"I Don't Mind"		9		
1945	"I'm Beginning to See the Light"	6	4		
1945	"Don't You Know I Care"		10		
1945	"I Ain't Got Nothin' but the Blues"		4		
1946	"Come to Baby, Do"	13			
1948	"Don't Be So Mean to Baby" (Columbia 38295)		15		
1949	"Take Love Easy" / "I Could Get a Man" (Columbia 38519)				
1953	"Satin Doll"				
1953	"Boo Dah"	30			
1954	"Skin Deep"			7	

=== Singles ===
- "The Asphalt Jungle" (1961) (Columbia)
