= Unknown Session =

1979 album by Duke Ellington

Studio album by Duke Ellington
- Released: 1979
- Recorded: July 14, 1960
- Genre: Jazz
- Length: 38:36
- Label: Columbia

Duke Ellington chronology
| Swinging Suites by Edward E. and Edward G. (1960) | Unknown Session (1979) | Piano in the Foreground (1961) |

Unknown Session is an album by American pianist, composer and bandleader Duke Ellington. It was recorded in 1960 but not released on the Columbia label until 1979.

== Reception ==
Professional ratings
Review scores
| Source | Rating |
|---|---|
| AllMusic | 4/5 stars |
| The Rolling Stone Jazz Record Guide | 3/5 stars |

The Bay State Banner noted that "most of the material is standards, but to each number Duke brings a subtle nuance a new shift a revised line."

The AllMusic review by Scott Yanow stated that "these renditions are quite enjoyable, swing hard and sound fresh. Ellington fans should pick this one up".

== Track listing ==
:All compositions by Duke Ellington except as indicated

1. "Everything But You" (Ellington, Don George, Harry James) – 3:32
2. "Black Beauty" – 3:16
3. "All Too Soon" (Ellington, Carl Sigman) – 3:12
4. "Something to Live For" (Ellington, Billy Strayhorn) – 2:45
5. "Mood Indigo" (Barney Bigard, Ellington, Irving Mills) – 3:48
6. "Creole Blues [Excerpt from Creole Rhapsody]" – 2:30
7. "Don't You Know I Care (Or Don't You Care to Know)" (Mack David, Ellington) – 2:57
8. "A Flower Is a Lovesome Thing" (Strayhorn) – 3:12
9. "Mighty Like the Blues" (Leonard Feather) – 3:19
10. "Tonight I Shall Sleep (With a Smile on My Face)" (Ellington, Irving Gordon) – 2:42
11. "Dual Highway" (Ellington, Johnny Hodges) – 2:52
12. "Blues" – 4:57

- Recorded at Radio Recorders, Los Angeles, on July 14, 1960

== Personnel ==
- Duke Ellington – piano
- Ray Nance – trumpet
- Lawrence Brown – trombone
- Johnny Hodges – alto saxophone
- Paul Gonsalves – tenor saxophone
- Harry Carney – baritone saxophone
- Aaron Bell – bass
- Sam Woodyard – drums
