= The Popular Duke Ellington =

1967 album by Duke Ellington

Studio album by Duke Ellington
- Released: 1967
- Recorded: May 9, 10 & 11, 1966
- Genre: Jazz
- Label: RCA
- Producer: Brad McCuen

Duke Ellington chronology
The Stockholm Concert, 1966 (1966)	The Popular Duke Ellington (1967)	In the Uncommon Market (1963-66)

The Popular Duke Ellington is a studio album by American pianist, composer and bandleader Duke Ellington featuring many of the tunes associated with his orchestra re-recorded in 1966 and released on the RCA label in 1967.

== Reception ==
The AllMusic review by Scott Yanow stated: "Since the material is all very familiar, and mostly quite concise few surprises occur. But Ellington fans will enjoy this well-played effort."

Professional ratings
Review scores
Source	Rating
AllMusic	3/5 stars
The Penguin Guide to Jazz Recordings	3/4 stars

== Track listing ==
All compositions by Duke Ellington except as indicated

1. "Take the "A" Train" (Billy Strayhorn) – 4:40
2. "I Got It Bad (and That Ain't Good)" (Ellington, Paul Francis Webster) – 2:36
3. "Perdido" (Juan Tizol) – 3:14
4. "Mood Indigo" (Ellington, Barney Bigard, Irving Mills) 5:10
5. "Black and Tan Fantasy" (Ellington, James "Bubber" Miley) – 5:12
6. "The Twitch" – 3:11
7. "Solitude" (Ellington, Mills, Eddie DeLange) – 3:36
8. "Do Nothin' Till You Hear from Me" (Ellington, Bob Russell) – 1:55
9. "The Mooche" (Ellington, Mills) – 5:36
10. "Sophisticated Lady" (Ellington, Mills, Mitchell Parish) – 3:02
11. "Creole Love Call" – 3:56
12. "Caravan" (Ellington, Mills, Tizol) – 5:27 Bonus track on CD reissue
13. "Wings and Things" (Johnny Hodges) – 1:59 Bonus track on CD reissue
14. "Do Nothin' Till You Hear from Me" [alternate take] (Ellington, Russell) – 1:56 Bonus track on CD reissue

- Recorded at RCA Hollywood Recording Studio B in Los Angeles, CA, on May 9 (tracks 1, 2, 9, 12 & 14), May 10 (tracks 5, 6, 10 & 11), and May 11 (tracks 3, 4, 7, 8 & 13), 1966.

== Personnel ==
- Duke Ellington – piano
- Cat Anderson, Mercer Ellington, Herb Jones, Cootie Williams – trumpet
- Lawrence Brown, Buster Cooper – trombone
- Chuck Connors – bass trombone
- Russell Procope – alto saxophone, clarinet
- Johnny Hodges – alto saxophone
- Jimmy Hamilton – tenor saxophone, clarinet
- Paul Gonsalves – tenor saxophone
- Harry Carney – baritone saxophone
- John Lamb – bass
- Sam Woodyard – drums
