= Live at the Blue Note (Duke Ellington album) =

Live album by Duke Ellington
- Released: 1959
- Recorded: August 9, 1959
- Venues: The Blue Note, Chicago
- Genre: Jazz
- Length: 134:46
- Label: Roulette

Duke Ellington chronology
| Anatomy of a Murder (1959) | Live at the Blue Note (1959) | Festival Session (1959) |

Live at the Blue Note is a live album by American pianist, composer and bandleader Duke Ellington recorded at The Blue Note nightclub in Chicago for the Roulette label in 1959.

The album was originally released as a single LP and rereleased as a double CD in 1994 with fourteen bonus tracks on the Blue Note label.

== Reception ==
The AllMusic review by Scott Yanow stated: "This two-CD set gives one a good example of how Duke Ellington's Orchestra sounded in 1959. Greatly expanded from the original single LP, the release essentially brings back a full night by the Ellington band, three nearly complete sets. The music ranges from old favorites to some newer material".

Professional ratings
Review scores
| Source | Rating |
|---|---|
| AllMusic | 4/5 stars |
| The Penguin Guide to Jazz Recordings | 3.5/4 stars |

== Track listing ==
All compositions by Duke Ellington, except where noted.

Disc 1

1. "Take the 'A' Train" (Billy Strayhorn) - 3:17 Bonus track on CD reissue
2. "Newport Up" (Ellington, Strayhorn) - 4:40 Bonus track on CD reissue
3. "Haupe" [aka "Polly's Theme"] - 3:58
4. "Flirtibird" - 3:01
5. "Pie Eye's Blues" - 3:16
6. "Almost Cried" - 3:20 Bonus track on CD reissue
7. "Duael Fuel (Dual Filter)" - (Ellington, Clark Terry) - 11:37 Bonus track on CD reissue
8. "Sophisticated Lady" (Ellington, Irving Mills, Mitchell Parish) - 3:56
9. "Mr. Gentle and Mr. Cool" (Shorty Baker, Ellington) - 7:17
10. "El Gato" (Cat Anderson) - 4:13 Bonus track on CD reissue
11. "C Jam Blues" (Barney Bigard, Ellington) - 4:52 Bonus track on CD reissue
12. "Tenderly" (Walter Gross, Jack Lawrence) - 5:30 Bonus track on CD reissue
13. "Honeysuckle Rose" (Andy Razaf, Fats Waller) - 4:20 Bonus track on CD reissue
14. "Drawing Room Blues" (Strayhorn) - 6:05 Bonus track on CD reissue
15. "Tonk" (Ellington, Strayhorn) - 1:57 Bonus track on CD reissue

Disc 2

1. "In a Mellow Tone" (Ellington, Milt Gabler) - 2:36
2. "All of Me" (Gerald Marks, Seymour Simons) - 2:31
3. "Things Ain't What They Used to Be" (Mercer Ellington) - 2:50
4. "Jeep's Blues" (Ellington, Johnny Hodges) - 3:50
5. "Mood Indigo" (Bigard, Ellington, Mills) - 11:02 Bonus track on CD reissue
6. "Perdido" (Juan Tizol) - 4:32
7. "Satin Doll" (Ellington, Strayhorn, Johnny Mercer) - 4:48 Bonus track on CD reissue
8. "A Disarming Visit by June Christy & Stan Kenton" - 2:56
9. "Newport Up" (Ellington, Strayhorn) - 5:03 Bonus track on CD reissue
10. "Medley: Black and Tan Fantasy/Creole Love Call/The Mooche" (Ellington, Strayhorn, James "Bubber" Miley) - 9:19
11. "Passion Flower" (Strayhorn) 5:13
12. "On the Sunny Side of the Street" (Dorothy Fields, Jimmy McHugh) - 4:29
13. "El Gato" (Anderson) - 4:18 Bonus track on CD reissue

== Personnel ==
- Duke Ellington – piano (tracks 1.2–2.13)
- Billy Strayhorn – piano (tracks 1.1 & 1.14)
- Cat Anderson, Shorty Baker, Willie Cook, Clark Terry – trumpet
- Ray Nance – trumpet, violin
- Quentin Jackson, Britt Woodman – trombone
- John Sanders – valve trombone
- Jimmy Hamilton – clarinet, tenor saxophone
- Johnny Hodges – alto saxophone
- Russell Procope – alto saxophone, clarinet
- Paul Gonsalves – tenor saxophone
- Harry Carney – baritone saxophone
- Jimmy Woode – bass (tracks 1.1–2.6 & 2.8–2.13)
- Johnny Pate – bass (track 2.7)
- Sam Woodyard – drums
- James "Jimmy" Johnson Jr. – drums
