= Hans Lengsfelder =

Austrian composer and playwright

Hans Lengsfelder (October 19, 1903 in Vienna, Austria – February 6, 1979 in Hallandale Beach, Florida) was a composer and playwright who also wrote under the pen name(s): H.J. Lengsfelder, Harry Lenk and John Peters. He emigrated to the U.S. in 1932. He had mixed success with his Broadway musical comedies.

Friends with Paramount Pictures A.J and Barney Balaban, Hans Lengsfelder was introduced by the Balabans to Joan Cohen Lengsfelder, whom he married November 10, 1942. The couple had two sons: Documentary filmmaker, TV writer/director and author Peter (PG) Lengsfelder and experimental filmmaker John Lengsfelder.

In addition to the Duke Ellington jazz standard Perdido (written by Juan Tizol, Ervin Drake and Lengsfelder), Hans Lengsfelder's songs and plays are still performed in Europe."Sag' Beim Abschied Leise Servus", recorded in the U.S. by Josephine Baker, Gloria Lynne and others, is still considered a classic in Europe. He is also known for his lyrics to "Eine kleine Fruhlingsweise" after A. Dvorak's Humoresques, Op. 101
