= Piano in the Background =

1960 album by Duke Ellington

Studio album by Duke Ellington
- Released: 1960
- Recorded: May 31 – June 30, 1960
- Genre: Jazz
- Label: Columbia

Duke Ellington chronology
The Nutcracker Suite (1960)	Piano in the Background (1960)	Swinging Suites by Edward E. and Edward G. (1960)

Piano in the Background is an album by American pianist, composer and bandleader Duke Ellington, recorded and released on the Columbia label in 1960.

== Reception ==
The AllMusic review by Thom Jurek stated: "designed to showcase a series of new arrangements for the Ellington Orchestra, it also offers the composer and bandleader as a pianist leading the band... In all, this and the two discs that were reissued as companions to this one, Piano in the Foreground and Blues in Orbit, mark a highly creative and productive time in Ellington's long career."

Professional ratings
Review scores
Source	Rating
AllMusic	4/5 stars

== Track listing ==
All compositions by Duke Ellington except as indicated

1. "Happy Go Lucky Local" – 3:02
2. "What Am I Here For" (Duke Ellington, Frankie Laine) – 4:08
3. "Medley: Kinda Dukish/Rockin' in Rhythm" (Ellington, Harry Carney, Irving Mills) – 5:52
4. "Perdido" (Juan Tizol) – 6:49
5. "I'm Beginning to See the Light" (Ellington, Don George, Johnny Hodges, Harry James) – 2:06
6. "Midriff" (Billy Strayhorn) – 4:29
7. "It Don't Mean a Thing (If It Ain't Got That Swing)" (Ellington, Mills) – 4:33
8. "Main Stem" – 4:15
9. "Take the 'A' Train" (Strayhorn) – 5:33
10. "Lullaby of Birdland" (George Shearing) – 5:23 Bonus track on CD reissue
11. "The Wailer" (Gerald Wilson) – 4:25 Bonus track on CD reissue
12. "Dreamy Sort of Thing" (Strayhorn) – 3:56 Bonus track on CD reissue
13. "Lullaby of Birdland" [alternate take] (Shearing) – 5:27 Bonus track on CD reissue
14. "Harlem Air Shaft" – 4:03 Bonus track on CD reissue

Recorded at Radio Recorders, Los Angeles, on May 31, 1960 (tracks 4 & 5), June 2, 1960 (track 7), June 20, 1960 (tracks 3, 10, 12 & 13), June 22, 1960 (track 8), June 28, 1960 (tracks 6 & 9), June 29, 1960 (track 2), June 30, 1960 (tracks 1 & 11), and March 3, 1961 (track 14)

== Personnel ==
- Johnny Hodges – alto saxophone
- Russell Procope – alto saxophone, clarinet
- Paul Gonsalves – tenor saxophone
- Jimmy Hamilton – tenor saxophone, clarinet
- Harry Carney – baritone saxophone, clarinet, bass clarinet
- Ray Nance, Willie Cook, Andres Meringuito, Eddy Mullins, Gerald Wilson – trumpet
- Lawrence Brown, Britt Woodman, Booty Wood – trombone
- Juan Tizol – valve trombone
- Duke Ellington – piano
- Aaron Bell – bass
- Sam Woodyard – drums
- Gerald Wilson – arrangement for "Perdido"
- W. A. Mathieu (as Bill Mathieu) – arrangement for "I'm Beginning to See the Light" and "It Don't Mean a Thing"
