= Hot Summer Dance =

Live album by Duke Ellington
- Released: 1991
- Recorded: July 22, 1960
- Venue: Mather Air Force Base, Sacramento, California
- Genre: Jazz
- Length: 67:19
- Label: Red Baron; AK 48631
- Producer: Bob Thiele

Duke Ellington chronology
Piano in the Background (1960)	Hot Summer Dance (1991)	Swinging Suites by Edward E. and Edward G. (1961)

Hot Summer Dance is a live album by American pianist, composer and bandleader Duke Ellington recorded at Mather Air Force Base in California and first released as a CD on Bob Thiele's Red Baron label in 1983.

== Reception ==
Professional ratings
Review scores
Source	Rating
Allmusic	2.5/5 stars

The Allmusic review by Scott Yanow stated, "There have been so many releases of live concert performances by Duke Ellington's orchestra that it is easy to become blase about them. ... Hot Summer Dance features the 1960 Duke Ellington Orchestra performing their usual repertoire from that era ... It may not be essential, but Ellington collectors will enjoy this".

== Track listing ==
All compositions by Duke Ellington except where noted

1. "Take the "A" Train" (Billy Strayhorn) – 5:05
2. "Paris Blues" − 5:42
3. "The Nutcracker Suite: Overture" (Pyotr Ilyich Tchaikovsky) − 3:35
4. "Tenderly" (Walter Gross, Jack Lawrence) − 3:35
5. "Such Sweet Thunder" (Ellington, Strayhorn) − 3:17
6. "Medley: Black and Tan Fantasy/Creole Love Call/The Mooche" (Ellington, Bubber Miley/Ellington/Ellington, Irving Mills) − 7:42
7. "Satin Doll" (Ellington, Strayhorn, Johnny Mercer) − 4:30
8. "All of Me" (Gerald Marks, Seymour Simons) − 2:36
9. "Jeep's Blues" (Ellington, Johnny Hodges) − 3:35
10. "Laura" (David Raksin, Mercer) − 3:42
11. "Dance of the Floreadores (Waltz of the Flowers)" (Tchaikovsky) − 4:50
12. "I Got It Bad (And That Ain't Good)" (Ellington, Paul Francis Webster) − 3:38
13. "Just Squeeze Me (But Don't Tease Me)" (Ellington, Lee Gaines) − 1:28
14. "It Don't Mean a Thing (If It Ain't Got That Swing)" (Ellington, Mills) − 1:52
15. "Pretty and the Wolf" (Ellington, Jimmy Hamilton) − 2:43
16. "Diminuendo and Crescendo in Blue" − 9:29

== Personnel ==
- Duke Ellington – piano
- Willie Cook, Fats Ford, Ed Mullens, Ray Nance – trumpet
- Lawrence Brown, Booty Wood, Britt Woodman – trombone
- Jimmy Hamilton – clarinet, tenor saxophone
- Johnny Hodges – alto saxophone
- Russell Procope – alto saxophone, clarinet
- Paul Gonsalves – tenor saxophone
- Harry Carney – baritone saxophone
- Aaron Bell – bass
- Sam Woodyard – drums
