= Festival Session =

Studio album by Duke Ellington
- Released: 1959
- Recorded: September 8, 1959
- Studio: Columbia 30th Street (New York)
- Genre: Jazz
- Label: Columbia

Duke Ellington chronology
Live at the Blue Note (1959)	Festival Session (1959)	Blues in Orbit (1959)

Festival Session is an album by American pianist, composer and bandleader Duke Ellington, recorded for the Columbia Records label in 1959. The album was rereleased on CD in 2004 with two bonus tracks.

According to the original liner notes by Irving Townsend, Ellington waited with the recording of the new material till the end of the festival season, before he started the recording session in New York and finally recorded the whole album "from 8 a.m. to Noon".

== Reception ==
The AllMusic reviewer Ken Dryden stated: "Duke Ellington was constantly composing new material as well as creating new arrangements of vintage works, as heard on this Columbia LP recorded in 1959... Long one of the classic sleepers awaiting discovery in Duke Ellington's considerable discography... Highly recommended".

Professional ratings
Review scores
Source	Rating
AllMusic	4/5 stars
DownBeat	5/5 stars
The Penguin Guide to Jazz Recordings	3.5/4 stars
The Rolling Stone Jazz Record Guide	5/5 stars

== Track listing ==
All compositions by Duke Ellington except as indicated

LP side A

1. "Perdido" (Juan Tizol) – 4:36
2. "Copout Extension" – 8:19
3. "Duael Fuel, Part 1" (Ellington, Clark Terry) – 2:45
4. "Duael Fuel, Part 2" (Ellington, Terry) – 1:43
5. "Duael Fuel, Part 3" (Ellington, Terry) – 6:17

LP side B

1. "Idiom '59, Part 1" – 2:02
2. "Idiom '59, Part 2" – 4:36
3. "Idiom '59, Part 3" – 7:06
4. "Things Ain't What They Used to Be" (Mercer Ellington) – 3:00
5. "Launching Pad" (Ellington, Terry) – 7:37

Bonus tracks on 2004 CD re-issue

11. "V.I.P.'s Boogie" – 2:57
12. "Jam With Sam" – 3:17
- Recorded at Columbia Records 30th Street Studio, New York, on September 8, 1959.

== Personnel ==
- Duke Ellington – piano
- Cat Anderson, Shorty Baker, Willie Cook, Fats Ford, Ray Nance, Clark Terry – trumpet
- Britt Woodman – trombone
- Quentin Jackson – trombone (tracks 1, 2 & 6–12), bass (tracks 3–5)
- John Sanders – valve trombone
- Jimmy Hamilton – clarinet, tenor saxophone
- Johnny Hodges – alto saxophone
- Russell Procope – alto saxophone, clarinet
- Paul Gonsalves – tenor saxophone
- Harry Carney – baritone saxophone
- Jimmy Woode – bass (tracks 1–2 & 9–12)
- Joe Benjamin – bass (tracks 6–8)
- Sam Woodyard, James Johnson – drums
