= Midnight in Paris (album) =

1962 album by Duke Ellington

Studio album by Duke Ellington
- Released: 1962
- Recorded: January 30 & 31, June 21 & 26, 1962
- Studio: Columbia 7th Ave, New York City
- Genre: Jazz
- Length: 42:26
- Label: Columbia
- Producer: Teo Macero

Duke Ellington chronology
All American in Jazz (1962)	Midnight in Paris (1962)	Duke Ellington Meets Coleman Hawkins (1962)

Midnight in Paris is an album by American pianist, composer and bandleader Duke Ellington recorded in 1962 for the Columbia label. The album features performances of compositions inspired by or associated with Paris.

== Reception ==
Professional ratings
Review scores
Source	Rating
Allmusic	1.5/5 stars

The Allmusic review by Scott Yanow awarded the album 1½ stars and stated "One of the odder Duke Ellington collections... Pretty music but far from essential".

== Track listing ==
1. "Under Paris Skies" (Hubert Giraud) – 2:41
2. "I Wish You Love" (Charles Trenet) – 3:50
3. "Mademoiselle de Paris" (Paul Durand) – 3:20
4. "Comme Çi Comme Ça" (Bruno Coquatrix) – 3:03
5. "Speak to Me of Love" (Jean Lenoir) – 2:02
6. "A Midnight in Paris" (Billy Strayhorn) – 3:33
7. "(All of a Sudden) My Heart Sings" (Harold Rome, Jean Marie Blanvillain, Henry Herpin) – 2:03
8. "Guitar Amour" (Duke Ellington) – 4:57
9. "The Petite Waltz" (Joe Heyne) – 4:14
10. "Paris Blues" (Ellington) – 4:21
11. "Javapachacha (Apache)" (adapted by Ellington) – 3:56
12. "No Regrets" (Charles Dumont) – 2:12
13. "The River Seine" (Guy Lafarge) – 2:14

- Recorded at Columbia Studio A, New York on January 30, 1962 (tracks 5, 8 & 10), January 31, 1962 (tracks 4, 9 & 11), February 27, 1962 (track 1), June 21, 1962 (tracks 3 & 6), and June 26, 1962 (tracks 2, 7, 12 & 13).

== Personnel ==
- Duke Ellington – piano (tracks 1–3, 6, 7, 12 & 13)
- Billy Strayhorn – piano (tracks 4, 5 & 8–11)
- Ray Nance – cornet
- Cat Anderson, Shorty Baker (tracks 1, 4, 5 & 8–11), Bill Berry (tracks 2, 5, 7, 8, & 11–13), Roy Burrowes (tracks 1–3, 6, 7, 12 & 13), Howard McGhee (tracks 4, 9 & 11) – trumpet
- Lawrence Brown, Buster Cooper (tracks 1–3, 6, 7, 12 & 13), Lyle Cox (tracks 4, 5 & 8–11) – trombone
- Chuck Connors – bass trombone
- Jimmy Hamilton – clarinet, tenor saxophone
- Johnny Hodges – alto saxophone
- Russell Procope – alto saxophone, clarinet
- Paul Gonsalves – tenor saxophone
- Harry Carney – baritone saxophone, clarinet, bass clarinet
- Aaron Bell – bass
- Sam Woodyard – drums
