= In the Uncommon Market =

1986 live album by Duke Ellington

Live album by Duke Ellington
- Released: 1986
- Recorded: February 6 or 7, & 21, 1963 and July 27, 1966
- Genre: Jazz
- Length: 49:45
- Label: Pablo
- Producer: Norman Granz

Duke Ellington chronology
The Popular Duke Ellington (1966)	In the Uncommon Market (1986)	Ella and Duke at the Cote D'Azur (1966)

In the Uncommon Market is a live album by American pianist, composer and bandleader Duke Ellington recorded in Europe in 1963 and 1966 and released on the Pablo label in 1986.

== Reception ==
The Allmusic review by Richard S. Ginell awarded the album 4½ stars and stated ""In the Uncommon Market," of course, refers to Europe, where Norman Granz caught the Ellington band numerous times with his tape machines in the 1960s. But it could also refer to the unusual repertoire featured on this collection."

Professional ratings
Review scores
Source	Rating
Allmusic	4.5/5 stars
The Penguin Guide to Jazz Recordings	3.5/4 stars

== Track listing ==
All compositions by Duke Ellington except as indicated

1. "Bula" - 4:44
2. "Silk Lace" - 5:18
3. "Asphalt Jungle" - 4:05
4. "Star-Crossed Lovers" (Ellington, Billy Strayhorn) - 4:19
5. "In a Sentimental Mood" (Ellington, Manny Kurtz, Irving Mills) - 3:47
6. "E.S.P." - 5:52
7. "Guitar Amour" - 7:35
8. "The Shepherd (First Concept)" - 5:33
9. "The Shepherd (Second Concept)" - 6:35
10. "Kinda Dukish" - 4:21

- Recorded in Stockholm, Sweden on February 6 or 7, 1963 (tracks 1–3 & 7), in Milan, Italy on February 21, 1963 (tracks 4–6) and Saint-Paul-de-Vence, France on July 27, 1966 (tracks 8–10).

== Personnel ==
- Duke Ellington – piano
- Cat Anderson, Roy Burrowes, Cootie Williams – trumpet (tracks 1–7)
- Ray Nance – trumpet, violin (tracks 1–7)
- Lawrence Brown, Buster Cooper – trombone (tracks 1–7)
- Chuck Connors – bass trombone (tracks 1–7)
- Russell Procope – alto saxophone, clarinet (tracks 1–7)
- Johnny Hodges – alto saxophone (tracks 1–7)
- Jimmy Hamilton – clarinet, tenor saxophone (tracks 1–7)
- Paul Gonsalves – tenor saxophone (tracks 1–7)
- Harry Carney – baritone saxophone, clarinet, bass clarinet (tracks 1–7)
- Ernie Shephard (tracks 1–7), John Lamb (tracks 8–10) – bass
- Sam Woodyard – drums
