= The Nutcracker Suite (Duke Ellington album) =

1960 album by Duke Ellington

Studio album by Duke Ellington
- Released: 1960
- Recorded: May 26, 31, June 3, 21–22, 1960
- Studio: Radio Recorders, Los Angeles
- Genre: Jazz, Christmas music
- Label: Columbia

Duke Ellington chronology
Blues in Orbit (1960)	The Nutcracker Suite (1960)	Piano in the Background (1960)

The Nutcracker Suite is an album by American pianist, composer and bandleader Duke Ellington recorded for Columbia Records in 1960 featuring jazz interpretations of the 1892 ballet "The Nutcracker" by Tchaikovsky, arranged by Ellington and Billy Strayhorn.

Professional ratings
Review scores
Source	Rating
AllMusic	4.5/5 stars
The Rolling Stone Jazz Record Guide	4/5 stars

== Track listing ==
All compositions by Pyotr Ilyich Tchaikovsky.

All arrangements by Duke Ellington and Billy Strayhorn.

1. "Overture" – 3:22
2. "Toot Toot Tootie Toot (Dance of the Reed-Pipes)" – 2:30
3. "Peanut Brittle Brigade (March)" – 4:37
4. "Sugar Rum Cherry (Dance of the Sugar-Plum Fairy)" – 3:05
5. "Entr'acte" – 1:53
6. "Volga Vouty (Russian Dance)" – 2:52
7. "Chinoiserie (Chinese Dance)" – 2:50
8. "Danse of the Floreadores (Waltz of the Flowers)" – 4:04
9. "Arabesque Cookie (Arabian Dance)" – 5:44

Recorded on May 26 (tracks 1 and 5), May 31 (track 2), June 3 (tracks 4 and 8), 21 (tracks 3 and 7) and 22 (tracks 6 and 9), 1960.

== Personnel ==
- Duke Ellington – piano
- Willie Cook, Fats Ford, Ray Nance, Clark Terry – trumpet
- Lawrence Brown, Booty Wood, Britt Woodman – trombone
- Juan Tizol – valve trombone
- Jimmy Hamilton – clarinet, tenor saxophone
- Johnny Hodges – alto saxophone
- Russell Procope – alto saxophone, clarinet
- Paul Gonsalves – tenor saxophone
- Harry Carney – baritone saxophone, clarinet, bass clarinet
- Aaron Bell – bass
- Sam Woodyard – drums
