= Swinging Suites by Edward E. and Edward G. =

1961 album by Duke Ellington

Swinging Suites by Edward E. & Edward G.

Studio album by Duke Ellington
- Released: c. 1961
- Recorded: June 28–30 and October 10, 1960
- Studio: Radio Recorders, Los Angeles
- Genre: Jazz; swing; big band; third stream
- Label: Columbia
- Producer: Irving Townsend

Duke Ellington chronology
Piano in the Background (1960)	Swinging Suites by Edward E. & Edward G. (1961)	Unknown Session (1960)

Swinging Suites by Edward E. & Edward G. (also known as Peer Gynt Suite/Suite Thursday) is an album by American pianist, composer and bandleader Duke Ellington recorded for the Columbia label in 1960 featuring a jazz interpretation of Peer Gynt by Edvard Grieg and Ellington's tribute to John Steinbeck's Sweet Thursday, co-written by Billy Strayhorn. The album was rereleased on CD as Three Suites along with Ellington's reworking of Tchaikovsky's The Nutcracker in 1990.

== Reception ==
Professional ratings
Review scores
Source	Rating
AllMusic	4.5/5 stars

In the 1960s, the Royal Swedish Academy of Music made a statement, referring to a Swedish law paragraph called "Klassikerskyddet" ("Protection of Classics") in the copyright legislation, that Duke Ellington's jazz versions on the album were "offending to the nordic music culture". Ellington withdrew the album and the case was never tried in court.

In 1992, The New York Times reviewed a live performance of Ellington's Peer Gynt adaptation: "The pieces, with their dense and gorgeous harmonies, lend themselves perfectly to live performance" and "the melody kept peeking around creamy harmonies, hurtling up-tempo sections abruptly merged with ballads".

== Track listing ==
Selections from Peer Gynt suites No. 1 and 2 written by Edvard Grieg adapted by Duke Ellington

1. "Morning Mood" – 4:24
2. "In the Hall of the Mountain King" – 2:33
3. "Solvejg's Song" – 3:59
4. "Ase's Death" – 3:47
5. "Anitra's Dance" – 2:58

Suite Thursday written by Duke Ellington and Billy Strayhorn

1. "Misfit Blues" – 4:09
2. "Schwiphti" – 3:04
3. "Zweet Zurzday" – 3:56
4. "Lay-By" – 4:50

Recorded in Los Angeles on June 28 (tracks 1 & 5), June 29 (tracks 3 & 4), June 30 (track 2), and October 10 (tracks 6–9), 1960.

== Personnel ==
- Duke Ellington – piano
- Willie Cook, Fats Ford, Moon Mullens, Gerald Wilson (track 2) – trumpet
- Ray Nance, – trumpet, violin (on "Lay-By") (uncredited)
- Lawrence Brown, Matthew Gee, Booty Wood, Britt Woodman (tracks 1–5) – trombone
- Juan Tizol – valve trombone
- Jimmy Hamilton – clarinet, tenor saxophone
- Johnny Hodges (tracks 1–5), Paul Horn (tracks 6–9) – alto saxophone
- Russell Procope – alto saxophone, clarinet
- Paul Gonsalves – tenor saxophone
- Harry Carney – baritone saxophone
- Aaron Bell – bass
- Sam Woodyard – drums
