= Russell Procope =

American jazz clarinetist and saxophonist (1908–1981)

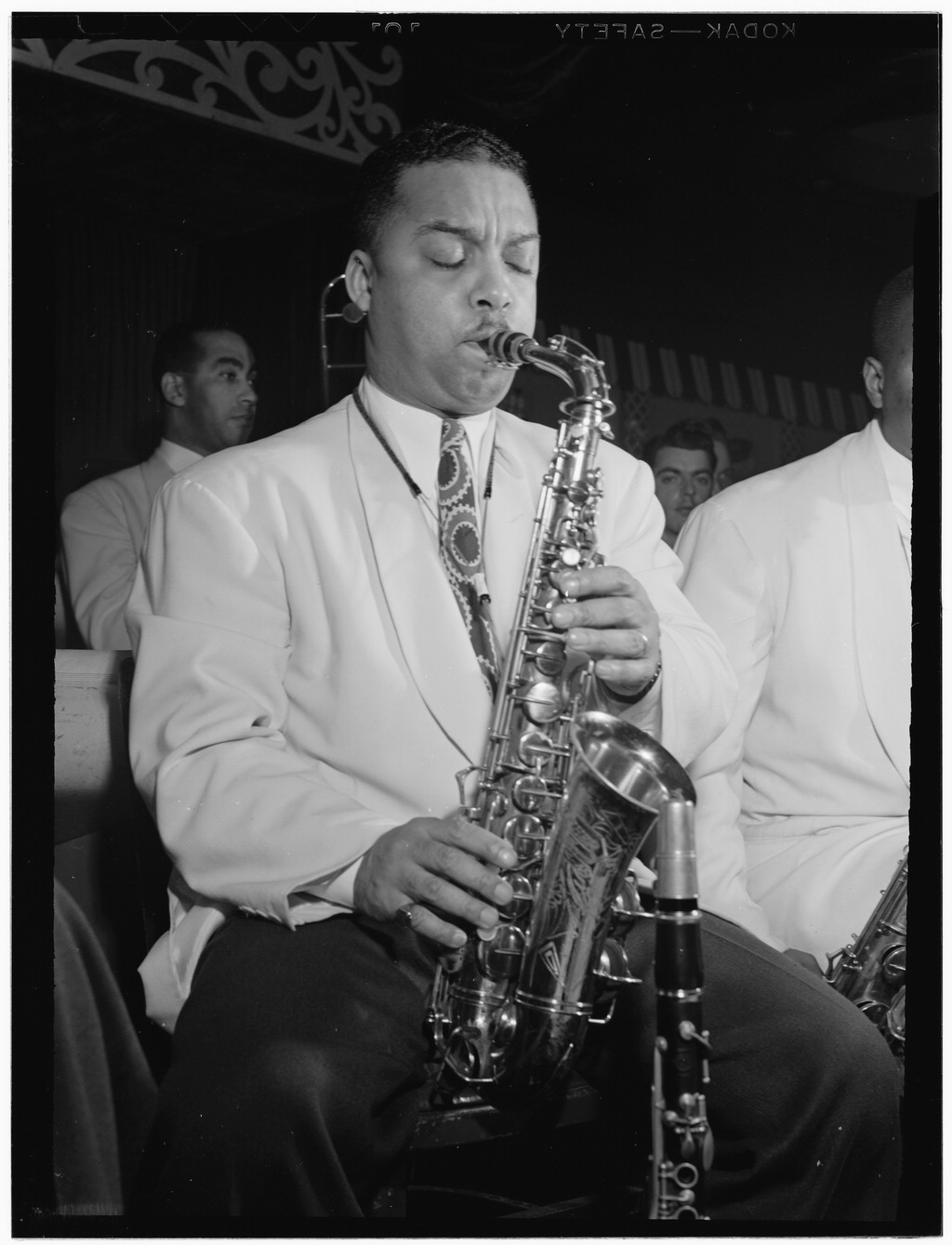
- Russell Procope

Background information
- Born: August 11, 1908; New York City, U.S.
- Died: January 21, 1981 (aged 72) New York City, U.S.
- Genres: Jazz
- Occupation: Musician
- Instruments: Clarinet, saxophone

Russell Keith Procope (August 11, 1908 – January 21, 1981) was an American clarinetist and alto saxophonist who was a member of the Duke Ellington orchestra.

== Before Ellington ==
Procope was born in New York City, United States, and grew up in San Juan Hill, where he attended school with Benny Carter. His first instrument was the violin, but he switched to clarinet and alto saxophone. He began his professional career in 1926 as a member of Billy Freeman's orchestra. He recorded with Jelly Roll Morton at the age of 20, and played with bands led by Benny Carter, Chick Webb (1929–30), Fletcher Henderson (spring of 1931 to 1934), Tiny Bradshaw, Teddy Hill, King Oliver, and Willie Bryant.

Fletcher Henderson's band dissolved in 1934. Along with several other ex-Henderson musicians, Procope joined Benny Carter's orchestra. He also worked for a time with the Tiny Bradshaw and Willie Bryant bands before joining Teddy Hill in 1935. During his stay with Teddy Hill's orchestra the trumpet section included, at various times, Roy Eldridge, Bill Coleman, Frankie Newton, and Dizzy Gillespie, while trombonist Dickie Wells and tenor-saxophonist Chu Berry were two other soloists who played with the band. It was as a member of this orchestra that Russell Procope made his first trip to Europe in 1937; Teddy Hill's band formed part of The Cotton Club Revue, an all-African American show, which during its European tour appeared at the London Palladium.

In 1938, Procope replaced Pete Brown in John Kirby's sextet, with whom he played exclusively alto sax until 1945 (with an interruption for World War II). It was with Kirby that he began to make his name. Kirby's band included Charlie Shavers (trumpet), Buster Bailey (clarinet), Procope (alto-sax), Billy Kyle (piano) and O'Neil Spencer (drums). This group was billed as "The Biggest Little Band In The World" - performing intricate, tightly-woven small-band orchestrations, combining precision with relaxation and a high standard of solo playing.

From September 1943 until the end of World War II, Procope served in the United States Army. He was a private with the 372nd Infantry Regiment band.

== Ellington and afterwards ==
Procope joined the Ellington orchestra in 1946, standing in for Otto Hardwick for one night in Worcester, Massachusetts, and staying until Ellington died in 1974. Procope came to Europe again as a member of this band during the summer of 1950. Like all members of the Ellington reed section except for alto saxophonist Johnny Hodges and tenor saxophonist Paul Gonsalves, Procope doubled on the clarinet, and it was on that instrument that he made his reputation. Though he was a fine saxophonist who could (and did) play tenor as well as alto saxophone with authority, Procope was most highly regarded for his woody, understated clarinet solos, a warm contrast to fellow reed section member Jimmy Hamilton's cheerful, breezy style. (A hearing of the contrast between the two clarinetists can be heard on Ellington's three-part suite "Idiom '59"; Ellington handed Procope the solo for the slower tempoed opening part, before handing Hamilton the first clarinet solo and the bridge blues solo on the more swinging second part.) Procope was also highly regarded personally within and outside the Ellington band. "He was", wrote Ellington in Music is My Mistress, "an utterly sober and reliable musician, always to be depended upon." After Ellington's death, Procope toured with Brooks Kerr's trio.

In 1956, Procope recorded The Persuasive Sax of Russ Procope under the London Records label. Procope played the alto-saxophone, along with Remo Biondi (rhythm guitar), Earl Backus (solo guitar), Paul Jordan (piano) Mel Schmidt (bass), and Frank Rullo (drums). Although Procope's early playing reflected the influence of Benny Carter, he had evolved a highly individual style. It combined an essentially lyrical approach with a forceful, swinging attack.

== Discography ==
With the Duke Ellington Orchestra

- Masterpieces by Ellington (Columbia, 1951)
- Ellington Uptown (Columbia, 1952)
- Live At The Crystal Gardens 1952 (Hep, 2011)
- Duke Ellington Presents... (Bethlehem, 1956)
- Blue Rose (Columbia, 1956) with Rosemary Clooney
- Historically Speaking
- A Drum Is a Woman (Columbia, 1956)
- Ellington at Newport (Columbia, 1956)
- Duke Ellington and the Buck Clayton All-Stars at Newport (Columbia, 1956)
- Such Sweet Thunder (Columbia, 1957)
- All Star Road Band (Doctor Jazz, 1957 [1983])
- Ellington Indigos (Columbia, 1957)
- Black, Brown and Beige (Columbia, 1958)
- Newport 1958 (Columbia, 1958)
- Live at the Blue Note (Roulette, 1959)
- Festival Session (Columbia, 1959)
- Blues in Orbit (Columbia, 1959)
- Anatomy of a Murder (Columbia, 1959)
- Jazz Party (Columbia, 1959)
- Piano in the Background (Columbia, 1960)
- Hot Summer Dance (Red Baron, 1960 [1991])
- First Time! The Count Meets the Duke (Columbia, 1962) with the Count Basie Orchestra
- The Nutcracker Suite
- Swinging Suites by Edward E. and Edward G. (Columbia, 1960)
- All American in Jazz (Columbia, 1962)
- Midnight in Paris (Columbia, 1962)
- Afro-Bossa (Reprise, 1963)
- Will Big Band Ever Come Back? (Reprise, 1962–1963 [1965])
- All Star Road Band Volume 2 (Doctor Jazz, 1964 [1985])
- Harlem (Pablo, 1964 [1985])
- Duke Ellington Plays Mary Poppins (Reprise, 1964 [1965])
- Ellington '65 (Reprise, 1964)
- Ella at Duke's Place (Verve, 1965)
- Ellington '66 (Reprise, 1965)
- Concert in the Virgin Islands (Reprise, 1965)
- In the Uncommon Market (Pablo, 1963–1966 [1986])
- Ella and Duke at the Cote D'Azur (Verve, 1966)
- The Far East Suite (RCA, 1966)
- Live in Italy 1967
- ...And His Mother Called Him Bill (RCA, 1967 [1968])
- Yale Concert (Fantasy, 1968 [1973])
- Francis A. & Edward K. (Reprise, 1967 [1968]) with Frank Sinatra
- Second Sacred Concert (Prestige, 1968)
- Liederhalle Stuttgart 1967 (SWR, Jazzhaus, 2020)
- Live At The Opernhaus Cologne 1969 (Delta Music, 2016)
- 70th Birthday Concert (Solid State, 1969 [1970])
- Latin American Suite (Fantasy, 1968–1970 [1972])
- New Orleans Suite (Atlantic, 1970)
- The Intimate Ellington (Pablo, 1969–1971 [1977])
- The Afro-Eurasian Eclipse (Fantasy, 1971 [1975])
- Togo Brava Suite (United Artists, 1971)
- Duke Ellington in Sweden 1973 (Caprice, 1973 [1999])
- The Ellington Suites (Fantasy, 1958–72 [1976])

With Dizzy Gillespie

- The Complete RCA Victor Recordings (Bluebird, 1937–1949 [1995])

With Johnny Hodges

- Ellingtonia '56 (Norgran, 1956)

With Billy Strayhorn

- Cue for Saxophone (Felsted, 1959)

== Sources ==
- Jazz: the Rough Guide (2nd edition). The Rough Guides, 2000. ISBN 1-85828-528-3
- Russell Procope — by Scott Yanow for Allmusic
- Russell Procope recordings at the Discography of American Historical Recordings.
- Liner notes from "The Persuasive Sax of Russ Procope", London Records, HA-D2013
