= Jazz Party =

Studio album by Duke Ellington
- Released: 1959
- Recorded: February 19 & 25, 1959
- Studios: Columbia 30th Street, New York City
- Genres: Jazz, big band, swing
- Length: 44:47 (LP), 49:57 (CD)
- Label: Columbia
- Producer: Irving Townsend

Duke Ellington chronology
Duke Ellington at the Alhambra (1958)	Jazz Party (1959)	Back to Back: Duke Ellington and Johnny Hodges Play the Blues (1959)

Jazz Party is a 1959 album by Duke Ellington and His Orchestra which contains a "formidable gallery of jazz stars" guesting, including Dizzy Gillespie and Jimmy Rushing (formerly the vocalist for Count Basie). It also featured a 9-strong percussion section on two tracks.

The recording was first digitally remixed by Larry Keyes and remastered by Vlado Meller in 1987 and released on CD in the CBS Jazz Masterpieces series. A new remastering by Bernie Grundman in the early 2000s was first issued by Mobile Fidelity Sound Lab.

== Critical reception ==
Professional ratings
Review scores
Source	Rating
AllMusic	4/5 stars
The Rolling Stone Jazz Record Guide	4/5 stars

Described as "an example of the ever-surprising repertoire that became characteristic of late Ellington", Jazz Party has been praised particularly for its unique percussion pieces. Village Voice reviewer Gary Giddins stated that the percussion song "Malletoba Spank" "will rattle in your brain until you die". The multi-part "Toot Suite" has been described as intriguing, though underrated, featuring strong statements from Ellington regulars and guests. Dizzy Gillespie's guest solo on "U.M.M.G." attracts much attention as well, and has been labeled both "enterprising" and "inspired".

== Track listing ==
No.	Title	Writer(s)	Length
1.	"Malletoba Spank"	Duke Ellington; Billy Strayhorn	3:39
2.	"Red Garter (Toot Suite, Pt. I)"	Ellington; Strayhorn	3:42
3.	"Red Shoes (Toot Suite, Pt. II)"	Ellington; Strayhorn	3:50
4.	"Red Carpet (Toot Suite, Pt. III, IV & V)"	Ellington; Strayhorn	7:42
5.	"Ready, Go! (Toot Suite, Pt. VI)"	Ellington; Strayhorn	6:35
6.	"Satin Doll"	Ellington; Strayhorn	2:44
7.	"U.M.M.G. (Upper Manhattan Medical Group)"	Strayhorn	4:32
8.	"All of Me"	Gerald Marks; Seymour Simons	2:32
9.	"Tymperturbably Blue"	Ellington; Strayhorn	4:23
10.	"Fillie Trillie"	Ellington	2:44
11.	"Hello Little Girl"	Ellington	7:51
Total length:			49:57

"Satin Doll" and "Fillie Trillie" are included on the Columbia reissues, not on the original LP, nor on the Mobile Fidelity CD release.

== Personnel ==
=== Performance ===
- Cat Anderson – trumpet
- Shorty Baker – trumpet
- Ray Nance – trumpet
- Clark Terry – trumpet
- Andres Ford – trumpet
- Quentin Jackson – trombone
- Britt Woodman – trombone
- John Sanders – valve trombone
- Jimmy Hamilton – clarinet, tenor saxophone
- Johnny Hodges – alto saxophone
- Russell Procope – clarinet, alto saxophone
- Paul Gonsalves – tenor saxophone
- Harry Carney – baritone saxophone
- Duke Ellington – piano
- Jimmy Woode – double bass
- Sam Woodyard – drums

Guests

- Dizzy Gillespie – trumpet on "U.M.M.G." and "Hello Little Girl"
- Jimmy Jones – piano on "Hello Little Girl"
- Jimmy Rushing – vocals on "Hello Little Girl"
- Percussion section on "Malletoba Spank" and "Tymperturbably Blue"
  - Elden C. Bailey – percussion
  - Harry Breuer – percussion
  - George Gaber – percussion
  - Morris Goldenberg – percussion
  - Chauncey Morehouse – percussion
  - Walter Rosenberg – percussion
  - Bobby Rosengarden – percussion
  - Milton Schlesinger – percussion
  - Brad Spinney – percussion

=== Production ===
- Irving Townsend – producer, liner notes
- Larry Keyes – digital remix (1987)
- Vlado Meller – remastering (1987)
- Bernie Grundman – remastering (early 2000s)
- Amy Herot – production coordination
