= Ray Nance =

American jazz trumpeter, violinist, and singer (1913–1976)

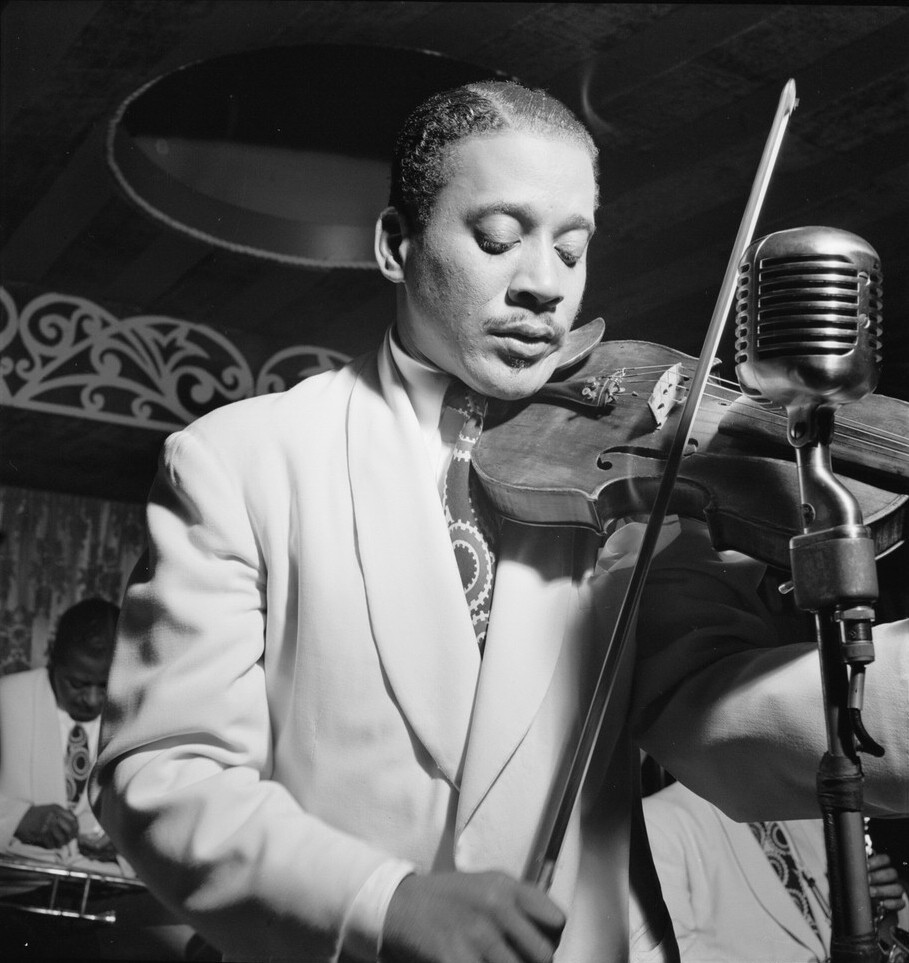

Background information
- Born: Ray Willis Nance; December 10, 1913; Chicago, Illinois, U.S.
- Died: January 28, 1976 (aged 62)
- Genres: Jazz
- Occupation: Musician
- Instruments: Trumpet, violin, vocals
- Formerly of: Duke Ellington

Ray Willis Nance (December 10, 1913 – January 28, 1976) was an American jazz trumpeter, violinist and singer. He is best remembered for his long association with Duke Ellington and his orchestra.

== Early years ==
Nance was born in Chicago on December 10, 1913. He started playing the violin at the age of 9 and was so proficient by the time he was 14 that he enrolled at the Chicago College of Music. In high school, he taught himself trumpet because “I wanted to hear myself on a louder instrument in way I couldn't do with a violin in an orchestra.” He was the leader of his own band in Chicago from 1932 to 1937. An ad in a June 1933 prom book at the Edgewater Beach Hotel for the Staples Cafe, 6344 N. Broadway, Chicago shows "Ray Nance and His Ebony Aces." Then, he worked with Earl Hines from 1937 to 1939; and from 1939 to 1940 he worked with Horace Henderson.

== Ellington tenure ==
Ellington hired Nance to replace trumpeter Cootie Williams, who had joined Benny Goodman, in 1940. Nance's first recorded performance with Ellington was at the Fargo, North Dakota ballroom dance. Shortly after joining the band, Nance was given the trumpet solo on the earliest recorded version of "Take the "A" Train", which became the Ellington theme. Nance's "A Train" solo is one of the most copied and admired trumpet solos in jazz history. Indeed, when Cootie Williams returned to the band more than twenty years later, he would play Nance's solo on "A Train" almost exactly as the original.

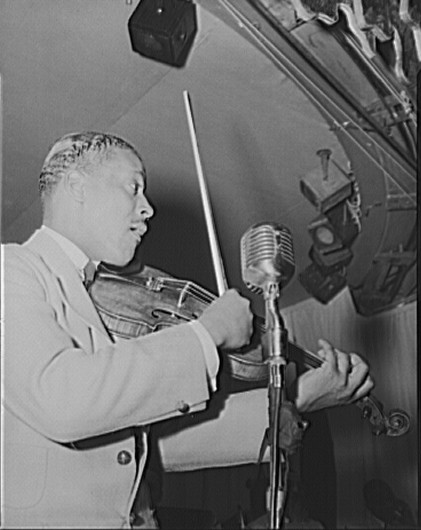
Nance in Duke Ellington's orchestra, 1943

Nance was often featured on violin, and was the only violin soloist ever featured in Ellington's orchestra (especially noteworthy is his violin contribution to the original 1942 version of "The 'C' Jam Blues"). He is also one of the better known male vocalists associated with Ellington's orchestra. On later recordings of "It Don't Mean a Thing (If It Ain't Got That Swing)", Nance took the previously instrumental horn riff into the lead vocal, which constitute the line "Doo wha, doo wha, doo wha, doo wha, yeah!" He was often featured as vocalist on "Jump for Joy," "Just A-Sittin' and A-Rockin'" and "Just Squeeze Me (But Please Don't Tease Me)". His multiple talents (trumpet, violin, vocals and also dancing) earned him the nickname "Floorshow".

Nance was absent from the Duke Ellington Orchestra for three or four months in 1946, including the date of that year's Carnegie Hall concert. In 1949, Nance participated, along with Ellington sidemen Russell Procope, Johnny Hodges and Sonny Greer on several Ivory Joe Hunter sessions, for King Records of Cincinnati.

== Post-Ellington years ==
He left Ellington in 1963 during their Middle East tour after having played alongside his returned predecessor Cootie Williams for a year. He continued to make several guest appearances in the orchestra over the years and later toured and recorded in England in 1974.

Nance made a few recordings as a bandleader, and also recorded or performed with Earl Hines, Rosemary Clooney, Jaki Byard, Chico Hamilton and others.

== Discography ==
=== As leader ===
- Ellingtonia (Wynne, 1959)
- A Flower Is A Lovesome Thing (Parker Records, 1959)
- Body and Soul (Solid State, 1970)
- Huffin' 'n' Puffin' (MPS, 1974)

=== As sideman ===
With Ahmed Abdul-Malik

- Spellbound (Status, 1964)

With Jaki Byard

- Jaki Byard with Strings! (Prestige, 1968)

With Duke Ellington

- The Duke at Fargo, 1940: Special 60th Anniversary Edition (Storyville, 1940 performance)
- Duke Ellington and His Great Vocalists (Sony, c. 1940s)
- Cabin in the Sky Soundtrack (Rhino, 1942 performance)
- Indispensable Duke Ellington, Vol. 11–12 (1944–1946) (RCA, 1944–1946 performances) or The Best of the Complete Duke Ellington RCA Recordings, 1944–1946) (RCA, 1944–1946 performances)
- Ellington Uptown (includes Harlem Suite, Controversial Suite, Liberian Suite) (Columbia, 1947, 1951, 1952 performances)
- Masterpieces by Ellington (Columbia, 1950, 1951 performances)
- Ellington '55 (Capitol, 1955) or Jazz Profile (Blue Note, 1950s, 1960s performances)
- A Drum Is a Woman (Columbia, 1956)
- Blue Rose (With Rosemary Clooney) (1956)
- Historically Speaking (1956)
- Ellington at Newport (Columbia, 1956)
- Such Sweet Thunder (Columbia, 1957)
- All Star Road Band (Doctor Jazz, 1957 [1983])
- Black, Brown and Beige (Columbia, 1958)
- Live at the Blue Note (1958)
- Newport 1958 (Columbia, 1958)
- Festival Session (Coilumbia, 1959)
- Blues in Orbit (Columbia, 1959)
- Anatomy of a Murder (Columbia, 1959)
- Jazz Party (Columbia, 1959)
- Piano in the Background (Columbia, 1960)
- Hot Summer Dance (Red Baron, 1960 [1991])
- The Nutcracker Suite (Columbia, 1960)
- Swinging Suites by Edward E. and Edward G. (1960) (Peer Gynt Suite/Suite Thursday)
- First Time! The Count Meets the Duke (Columbia, 1961)
- All American in Jazz (Columbia, 1962)
- Midnight in Paris (Columbia, 1962)
- Duke Ellington Meets Coleman Hawkins (Impulse!, 1962)
- The Great Paris Concert (Atlantic, 1963)
- Duke Ellington's Jazz Violin Session (Atlantic, 1963)
- My People (1963)
- Afro-Bossa (Reprise, 1963)
- The Symphonic Ellington (1963)
- Ellington '66 (1965)
- Concert in the Virgin Islands (1966)
- In the Uncommon Market (1966)

With Horace Henderson

- Horace Henderson 1940, Fletcher Henderson 1941 (Classics, 1992)

With Earl Hines

- Rosetta (Jazz Archives, 1937–1939 selections)
- 1937–1939 (Classics, 1937–1939 performances)
- Harlem Lament (Sony, 1937–1938 selections featuring Nance)
- Piano Man! (ASV, includes c. 1937–1939 RCA selections)
- Earl Hines and the Duke's Men (Delmark, 1944–1947 performances)
- 1942–1945 (Classics, 1942–1945)

With Johnny Hodges

- Ellingtonia '56 (Norgran, 1956)
- Duke's in Bed (Verve, 1956)
- The Big Sound (Verve, 1957)
- Not So Dukish (Verve, 1958)
- Triple Play (RCA Victor, 1967)

With Budd Johnson

- Budd Johnson and the Four Brass Giants (Riverside, 1960)

With Joya Sherrill

- Joya Sherrill Sings Duke (20th Century Fox, 1965)
