= Aaron Bell (musician) =

American jazz double bassist (1921–2003)

- Born: Samuel Aaron Bell; April 24, 1921; Muskogee, Oklahoma, U.S.
- Died: July 28, 2003 (aged 82) The Bronx, New York, U.S.
- Genre: Jazz
- Occupation: Musician
- Instruments: Double bass; piano
- Years active: 1940s–1989
- Labels: RCA Victor; Lion
- Formerly of: Andy Kirk; Lucky Millinder; Stan Kenton; Cab Calloway; Dick Haymes; Duke Ellington
- Education: Xavier University; New York University; Teachers College at Columbia University (EdD)
- Employer: Essex County College
- Organization: La MaMa Experimental Theatre Club

Samuel Aaron Bell (April 24, 1921 – July 28, 2003) was an American jazz double bassist.

== Early life and education ==
Bell was born in Muskogee, Oklahoma, on April 24, 1921. He played the piano as a child and learned to play brass instruments in high school. He attended Xavier University, where he began playing double bass, and graduated in 1942. He served in a U.S. Navy band during World War II, completing his service in 1946.

Bell was a member of Andy Kirk's band in 1946 but left to enroll in graduate school at New York University in 1947. After completing his master's degree, he joined Lucky Millinder's band and gigged with Teddy Wilson. He later received a doctorate in education from Teachers College at Columbia University.

== Career ==
In the 1950s, Bell appeared on Billie Holiday's album Lady Sings the Blues and played with Lester Young, Stan Kenton, Johnny Hodges, Cab Calloway, Carmen McRae, and Dick Haymes. In 1960, he left Haymes's band after being offered a position in Duke Ellington's orchestra opposite drummer Sam Woodyard. He left Ellington's orchestra in 1962, and went on to play with Dizzy Gillespie before taking a series of jobs on Broadway as a pit musician. He and Ellington collaborated again in 1967 on ...And His Mother Called Him Bill, a tribute album dedicated to Billy Strayhorn.

Bell was a resident artist at La MaMa Experimental Theatre Club in New York City from 1969 to 1972. At La MaMa, he wrote music for Ed Bullins's one-act plays, produced as Short Bullins in 1972, and for William Mackey's Family Meeting. His music for Bullins's plays toured with the Jarboro Company, named after Caterina Jarboro and directed by Hugh Gittens, in Italy in 1972. During this tour, the company performed Bullins's one-acts and Richard Wesley's Black Terror in Milan and Venice.

Bell gave a performance of his original compositions, including the pieces he wrote for those plays, on March 19, 1972, as part of the Music at La MaMa concert series. He also wrote the music for the Cotton Club Gala, which was originally produced at La MaMa in 1975 and was revived and directed by Ellen Stewart in 1985.

Bell taught at Essex County College in Newark, New Jersey, from 1970 until 1990. In the 1970s, he toured with Norris Turney, Harold Ashby, and Cat Anderson. In the 1980s, he returned to the piano.

== Death ==
Bell retired from active performance in 1989 and died in 2003, at the age of 82, in the Bronx.

== Discography ==
=== As leader ===
- After the Party's Over (RCA Victor, 1958)
- Music from 77 Sunset Strip (Lion, 1959)
- Richard Rodgers' Victory at Sea in Jazz (Lion, 1959)
- Music from Peter Gunn (Lion, 1959)

=== As sideman ===
With Buck Clayton

- Buck Meets Ruby with Ruby Braff (Vanguard, 1954)
- Buckin' the Blues (Vanguard, 1957)

With Cy Coleman

- Cool Coleman (Westminster, 1958)
- Flower Drum Song (Westminster, 1958)
- Why Try to Change Me Now (Westminster, 1959)

With Duke Ellington

- Hot Summer Dance (Red Baron, 1960 [1991])
- The Nutcracker Suite (Columbia, 1960)
- Swinging Suites by Edward E. and Edward G. (Columbia, 1961)
- Piano in the Foreground (Columbia, 1961)
- First Time! The Count Meets the Duke (Columbia, 1961)
- Paris Blues (Columbia, 1961)
- Midnight in Paris (Columbia, 1962)
- Duke Ellington Meets Coleman Hawkins (Impulse!, 1963)
- Duke Ellington & John Coltrane (Impulse!, 1963)
- ...And His Mother Called Him Bill (RCA, 1968)

With Earl Hines

- Up to Date with Earl Hines (RCA Victor, 1965)
- Once Upon a Time (Impulse!, 1966)

With Johnny Hodges

- Johnny Hodges with Billy Strayhorn and the Orchestra (Verve, 1962)
- Triple Play (RCA Victor, 1967)

With Friedrich Gulda

- Friedrich Gulda at Birdland (RCA Victor, 1957)
- A Man of Letters (Decca, 1957)

With Sonny Stitt

- A Little Bit of Stitt (Roost, 1959)
- Sonny Side Up (Roost, 1960)
- Stitt in Orbit (Roost, 1963)

With Charles Thompson

- Sir Charles Thompson and His Band Starring Coleman Hawkins (Vanguard, 1954)
- Sir Charles Thompson Trio (Vanguard, 1955)
- Rockin' Rhythm (Columbia, 1961)
- Sir Charles Thompson Sextet and Band (Vanguard, 1973)

With others

- Mose Allison, Takes to the Hills (Epic, 1961)
- Harold Ashby, Tenor Stuff (Metronome, 1961)
- Mae Barnes, Mae Barnes (Vanguard, 1959)
- Vic Dickenson, Slidin' Swing (Jazztone, 1957)
- Don Elliott, Doubles in Brass (Vanguard, 1955)
- Johnny Griffin, Soul Groove (Atlantic, 1963)
- Urbie Green, Old Time Modern (Vanguard, 1973)
- Billie Holiday, Lady Sings the Blues (Clef, 1956)
- Junior Mance, The Good Life (Tuba, 1965)
- Carmen McRae, Birds of a Feather (Decca, 1958)
- Sam Most, Sam Most Sextet (Vanguard, 1955)
- Seldon Powell, Seldon Powell Sextet Featuring Jimmy Cleveland (Sonet, 1956)
- Jimmy Rushing, If This Ain't the Blues (Vanguard, 1958)
- Charlie Shavers, Horn O' Plenty (Bethlehem, 1954)
- Lou Stein, Eight for Kicks Four for Laughs (Jubilee, 1956)
- Buddy Tate, Swinging Like Tate (Felsted, 1958)
- Norris Turney, I Let a Song (Black & Blue, 1978)
- Randy Weston, Highlife (Colpix, 1963)
- Joe Williams, A Night at Count Basie's (Vanguard, 1956)
- Lester Young, Pres Is Blue (Charlie Parker, 1963)
