= Ellington '66 =

1965 album by Duke Ellington

Studio album by Duke Ellington
- Released: 1965
- Recorded: January 19 & 21, 1965
- Studio: Fine, New York City
- Genre: Jazz, big band
- Label: Reprise

Duke Ellington chronology
Joya Sherrill Sings Duke (1965)	Ellington '66 (1965)	Concert in the Virgin Islands (1965)

Ellington '66 is an album by American pianist, composer, and bandleader Duke Ellington, recorded and released on the Reprise label in 1965. The album won a Grammy Award for Best Instrumental Jazz Performance – Large Group or Soloist with Large Group.

== Reception ==
The AllMusic review by Matt Collar stated: "Ellington '66 is yet another example of how the change in popular music toward an all rock & roll format found jazz musicians attempting crossover material with varying degrees of success... While Ellington '66 isn't a bad recording and actually bests '65 for sheer listening pleasure, it is by no means required listening and will most likely appeal to die-hard Ellington completists."

Professional ratings
Review scores
Source	Rating
AllMusic	3.5/5 stars

== Track listing ==
1. "Red Roses for a Blue Lady" (Sid Tepper, Roy C. Bennett) – 3:40
2. "Charade" (Henry Mancini, Johnny Mercer) – 2:40
3. "People" (Jule Styne, Bob Merrill) – 3:22
4. "All My Loving" (John Lennon, Paul McCartney) – 3:26
5. "A Beautiful Friendship" (Donald Kahn, Stanley Styne) – 2:47
6. "I Want to Hold Your Hand" (Lennon, McCartney) – 2:04
7. "Days of Wine and Roses" (Mancini, Mercer) – 3:23
8. "I Can't Stop Loving You" (Don Gibson) – 3:57
9. "The Good Life" (Sacha Distel, Jack Reardon) – 3:16
10. "Satin Doll" (Ellington, Mercer, Billy Strayhorn) – 2:31
11. "Moon River" (Mancini, Mercer) – 2:42
12. "Ellington '66" (Ellington) – 2:34

== Personnel ==
- Duke Ellington – piano
- Cat Anderson, Herb Jones, Cootie Williams – trumpet
- Rolf Ericson – trumpet (tracks 2, 3, 8 & 9)
- Ray Nance – trumpet (tracks 1, 4–7 & 10–12)
- Mercer Ellington – trumpet (tracks 4, 7, 10 & 11)
- Lawrence Brown, Buster Cooper – trombone
- Chuck Connors – bass trombone
- Jimmy Hamilton – clarinet, tenor saxophone
- Johnny Hodges – alto saxophone
- Russell Procope – alto saxophone, clarinet
- Paul Gonsalves, Harry Carney – tenor saxophone
- Peck Morrison – double bass (tracks 2, 3, 8 & 9)
- John Lamb – bass (tracks 1, 4–7 & 10–12)
- Sam Woodyard – drums
