= Piano in the Foreground =

Studio album by Duke Ellington
- Released: 1961
- Recorded: March 1 & 2, 1961
- Studio: Columbia 30th Street, New York City; Radio Recorders, Los Angeles
- Genre: Jazz
- Label: Columbia

Duke Ellington chronology
Piano in the Background (1960)	Piano in the Foreground (1961)	The Great Summit (1961)

Piano in the Foreground is an album by American pianist, composer and bandleader Duke Ellington recorded and released on the Columbia label in 1961. It features Ellington in a piano trio setting, emphasizing his own keyboard prowess rather than the big band arrangements more typical of his recordings.

Professional ratings
Review scores
Source	Rating
All Music Guide to Jazz	4/5 stars

== Track listing ==
All compositions by Duke Ellington except as indicated

1. "I Can't Get Started" (Vernon Duke, Ira Gershwin) – 4:23
2. "Cong-Go" (Aaron Bell, Ellington) – 4:16
3. "Body and Soul" (Johnny Green, Edward Heyman, Robert Sour, Frank Eyton) – 4:49
4. "Blues for Jerry" – 4:38
5. "Fontainebleau Forest" – 2:53
6. "Summertime" (George Gershwin, Ira Gershwin, Dubose Heyward) – 3:52
7. "It's Bad to Be Forgotten" – 3:22
8. "A Hundred Dreams Ago" – 2:26
9. "So" – 4:33
10. "Searching (Pleading for Love)" – 1:49
11. "Springtime in Africa" (Bell, Ellington) – 3:46
12. "Lotus Blossom" (Billy Strayhorn) – 3:18
13. "All the Things You Are" (Jerome Kern, Oscar Hammerstein II) – 4:00 Bonus track on CD reissue
14. "All the Things You Are" [alternate take] (Kern, Hammerstein) – 3:51 Bonus track on CD reissue
15. "Piano Improvisation No. 2" – 3:25 Bonus track on CD reissue
16. "Piano Improvisation No. 3" – 2:48 Bonus track on CD reissue
17. "Piano Improvisation No. 4" – 1:53 Bonus track on CD reissue
18. "Piano Improvisation No. 1" – 9:45 Bonus track on CD reissue

Recorded:

- at Columbia 30th Street Studio, New York City, on March 20, 1957 (tracks 15–18) (stereo)
- at Columbia 30th Street Studio, New York City, on October 10, 1957 (tracks 13–14) (mono)
- at Radio Recorders, Los Angeles, on March 1, 1961 (tracks 1–11) & March 2, 1961 (track 12) (stereo)

== Personnel ==
- Duke Ellington – piano
- Aaron Bell – bass (tracks 1–12)
- Jimmy Woode – bass (tracks 13–18)
- Sam Woodyard – drums
