= Anatomy of a Murder =

1959 film by Otto Preminger

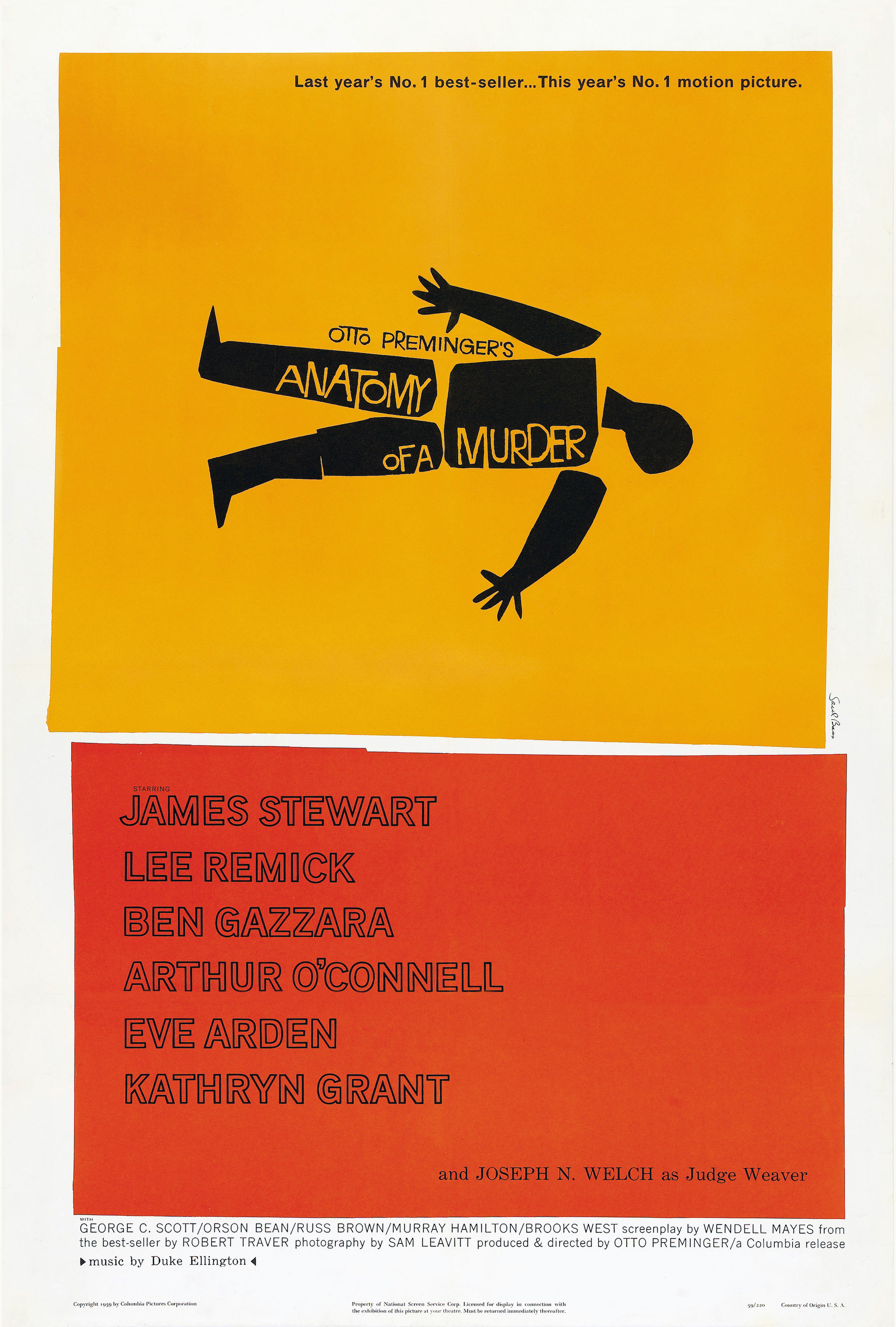
- Theatrical release poster by Saul Bass
- Directed by: Otto Preminger
- Screenplay by: Wendell Mayes
- Based on: Anatomy of a Murder; 1958 novel by Robert Traver
- Produced by: Otto Preminger
- Starring: James Stewart; Lee Remick; Ben Gazzara; Arthur O'Connell; Eve Arden; Kathryn Grant
- Cinematography: Sam Leavitt
- Edited by: Louis R. Loeffler
- Music by: Duke Ellington
- Production company: Carlyle Productions
- Distributed by: Columbia Pictures
- Release date: July 2, 1959 (New York)
- Running time: 160 minutes
- Country: United States
- Language: English
- Budget: $2 million
- Box office: $8 million (rentals)

Anatomy of a Murder is a 1959 American legal drama film produced and directed by Otto Preminger. The screenplay by Wendell Mayes was based on the 1958 novel of the same name written by Michigan Supreme Court Justice John D. Voelker under the pen name of Robert Traver. Voelker based the novel on a 1952 murder case in which he was the defense attorney.

The film stars James Stewart, Lee Remick, Ben Gazzara, Arthur O'Connell, Eve Arden, and Kathryn Grant. The judge was played by Joseph N. Welch, a real-life lawyer famous for dressing down Joseph McCarthy during the Army–McCarthy hearings. It has a musical score by Duke Ellington, who also appears in the film. It has been described by Michael Asimow, UCLA law professor and co-author of Reel Justice: The Courtroom Goes to the Movies (2006), as "probably the finest pure trial movie ever made".

In 2012, the film was selected for preservation in the United States National Film Registry by the Library of Congress as being "culturally, historically, or aesthetically significant".

== Plot ==
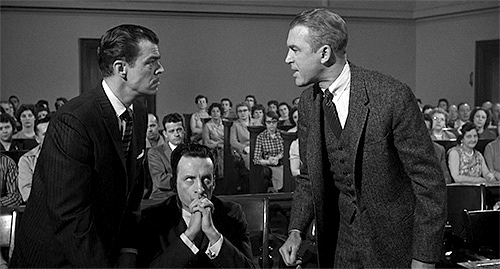
Brooks West, George C. Scott and James Stewart

In the Upper Peninsula of Michigan, small-town lawyer Paul Biegler, a former district attorney who lost his re-election bid, spends most of his time fishing, playing the piano, and hanging out with his alcoholic friend and colleague Parnell McCarthy and sardonic secretary Maida Rutledge.

Laura Manion contacts Biegler to defend her husband, US Army Lieutenant Frederick "Manny" Manion, arrested for the murder of innkeeper Bernard "Barney" Quill. Manion does not deny the murder but claims Quill raped his wife. Even with the rape motivation, Biegler believes getting Manion cleared of murder will be difficult. Manion claims to have no memory of the event, which suggests he may be eligible for a defense of irresistible impulse—a version of a temporary insanity defense. It is strongly implied that Manion is faking insanity, guided to it as a potential defense by Biegler in his questioning.

Biegler's folksy speech and laid-back demeanor hide a sharp legal mind and a propensity for courtroom theatrics that keeps the judge busy maintaining control. The case for the defense does not go well, however, especially as local district attorney Mitch Lodwick is assisted by high-powered prosecutor Claude Dancer from the Attorney General's office. Furthermore, the prosecution tries at every instance to block any mention of Manion's motive for killing Quill. Biegler eventually manages to get the rape of Laura Manion into the record, and Judge Weaver agrees to allow the matter to be part of the deliberations. During cross-examination, Dancer insinuates that Laura frequented the bar without her husband, dressed provocatively, moved enticingly while playing pinball, and openly flirted with other men, including the man she claimed raped her. Psychiatrists give conflicting testimony to Manion's state of mind at the time he killed Quill. Dancer posits that Manion suspected Laura of cheating on him because he asked her, a Catholic, to swear on a rosary that Quill raped her. This raises doubt as to whether the act was consensual.

Quill's estate is to be inherited by Mary Pilant, whom Dancer accused of being Quill's mistress. McCarthy learns that Pilant is Quill's daughter, a fact she is anxious to keep secret since she was born out of wedlock. Fearing that he is losing the case, Biegler tries to persuade Pilant that Al Paquette, the bartender who witnessed the murder, may be covering up Quill's admission that he raped Laura, either because Paquette loves Pilant or out of loyalty to Quill. Through Pilant, Biegler is unable to get Paquette to testify on behalf of Manion.

During direct examination, Laura claims that Quill tore off her panties while raping her. The prosecution points out that the panties were not found where she alleged the rape took place. Previously unaware of any details of the case, Pilant hears about the missing torn panties during the testimony. She tells Biegler and later testifies that she found the torn panties in the inn's laundry room the morning after the alleged rape. Biegler suggests Quill may have attempted to avoid suspicion by dropping the panties down the laundry chute located next to his room. Dancer tries to establish that Pilant's answers are founded on jealousy, asserting forcibly that Quill was Pilant's lover and that Pilant lied to cover up their relationship. Pilant shocks everyone by stating that Quill was her father. Manion is found not guilty by reason of irresistible impulse temporary insanity. After the trial, Biegler decides to open a new practice, with a newly sober McCarthy as his partner.

The next day, Biegler and McCarthy travel to the Manions' trailer park home to get Manion's signature on a promissory note which they hope will suffice as collateral for a desperately needed loan. The superintendent informs them that the Manions have vacated the trailer park, commenting that Laura Manion had been crying. Manion left a note for Biegler, indicating that his flight was "an irresistible impulse", the same justification Biegler used during the trial. Biegler states that Mary Pilant has retained him to execute Quill's estate; McCarthy says that working for her will be "poetic justice".

== Cast ==
- James Stewart as Paul Biegler
- Lee Remick as Laura Manion
- Ben Gazzara as Lt. Frederick Manion
- Arthur O'Connell as Parnell McCarthy
- Eve Arden as Maida Rutledge
- Kathryn Grant as Mary Pilant
- George C. Scott as Claude Dancer
- Orson Bean as Dr. Matthew Smith
- Russ Brown as George Lemon
- Murray Hamilton as Alphonse Paquette
- Brooks West as Mitch Lodwick
- Ken Lynch as Sgt. James Durgo
- John Qualen as Deputy Sheriff Sulo
- Howard McNear as Dr. Dompierre
- Alexander Campbell as Dr. Gregory Harcourt
- Ned Wever as Dr. Raschid
- Jimmy Conlin as Clarence Madigan
- Royal Beal as Sheriff Battisfore
- Joseph Kearns as Mr. Burke, crime scene photographer
- Don Ross as Duke Miller
- Lloyd Le Vasseur as Court clerk
- James Waters as Army sergeant
- Joseph N. Welch as Judge Weaver
- Duke Ellington as "Pie-Eye" (uncredited)
- Irv Kupcinet as Distinguished gentleman (uncredited)

== Inspiration ==
Theatrical trailer

On July 31, 1952, Lt. Coleman A. Peterson shot and killed Maurice Chenoweth at Lumberjack Tavern Big Bay, Michigan. Voelker was retained as defense attorney a few days later. Peterson's wife Charlotte had claimed Chenoweth raped and beat her.

The trial started on September 15, 1952, and Assistant Attorney General Irving Beattie assisted Marquette County Prosecuting Attorney Edward Thomas. Voelker used a rare version of the insanity defense called irresistible impulse that had not been used in Michigan since 1886. The jury deliberated for four hours on September 23, 1952, before returning a verdict of not guilty by reason of insanity. Two days later, after Peterson was examined by two physicians who judged him sane, he was released.

Peterson and his wife were divorced soon after the trial. Hillsdale Circuit Court Judge Charles O. Arch Sr. tried the case because of the illness of a local judge.

The real case is the topic of the book, Murder at the Lumberjack Tavern, by author Patrick J. Baker. This book, published on October 20, 2026, covers the real trial that inspired the novel and the movie.

== Production ==
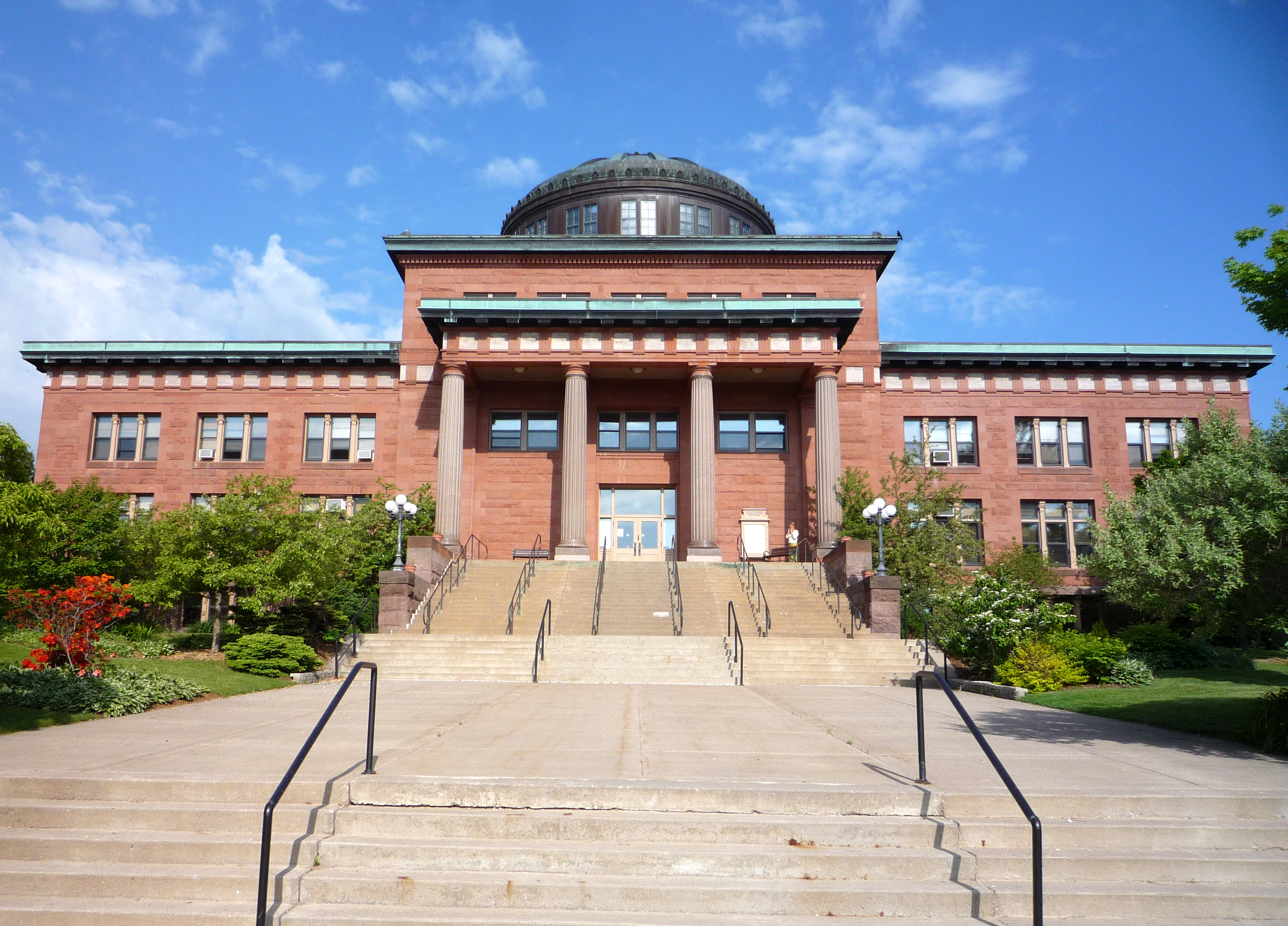
The Marquette County Courthouse was used for courthouse scenes.

Wendell Mayes was approached by Otto Preminger to see if he wanted to adapt the book and the novelist was agreeable. Mayes called it "a good movie. I think it was one of my best screenplays.... No one was cast when I started working on Anatomy of a Murder. Stewart was cast after it was written. Lana Turner was cast and then stepped out, and Lee Remick came in. It was written without any actors in mind."

Independently made, the film was shot in several locations in the Upper Peninsula of Michigan (Big Bay, Marquette, Ishpeming, and Michigamme). Some scenes were filmed in the Thunder Bay Inn in Big Bay, one block from the Lumberjack Tavern, the site of the 1952 murder that inspired much of the novel. The scene of the train was captured at the Ishpeming train station with the arrival of the daily Peninsula 400.

The film was previewed on June 18, 1959, in Chicago, which Variety said was 21 days after filming had finished and a record for a big-budget film. It had its first screening at the Butler Theater in Ishpeming and the Nordic Theater in Marquette on June 29, 1959. The world premiere for the film was held on July 1, 1959, at the United Artists Theater in Detroit.

== Legal aspects ==
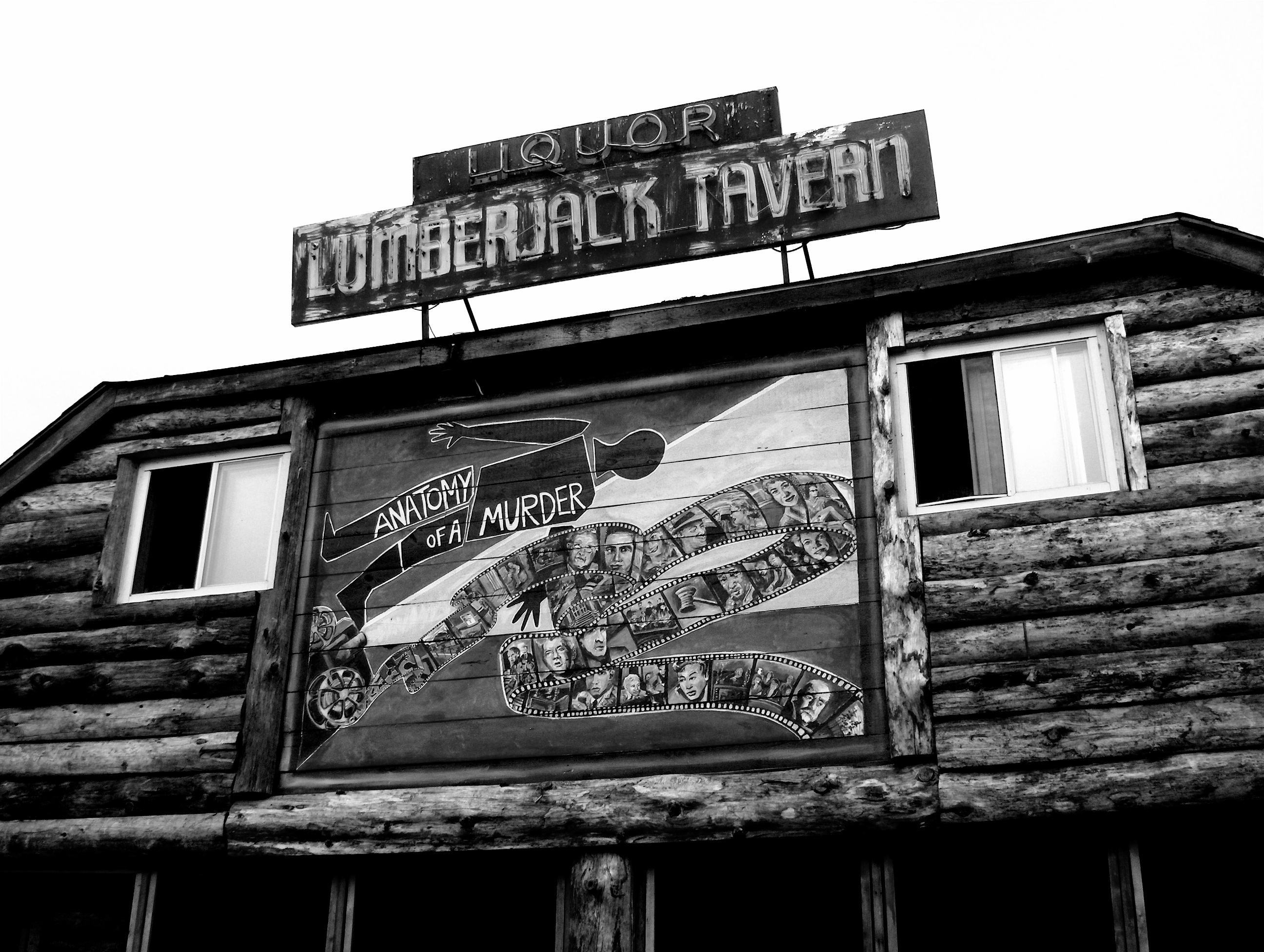
Facade of the Lumberjack Tavern, the scene of the actual homicide on which the film is based

The film examines the apparent fallibility of the human factor in jurisprudence. In various ways all of the human components—the counsel for defense and prosecution, the defendant and his wife, and the witnesses—have their own differing positions on what is right or wrong, and varying perspectives on integrity, justice, morality and ethics. The reliance on credibility of witnesses, and the "finding of facts" based upon those determinations, is the "Achilles heel" of the judicial process.

One controversial legal issue in this film is possible witness coaching, a violation of legal canons. The only plausible legal defense Lt. Manion has—the insanity defense—is virtually spelled out to a befuddled Manion by his prospective counsel, who then temporarily suspends the conversation and suggests that Manion rethink his factual/legal position. Witness coaching by the prosecution is even more blatant as they call in other jail inmates awaiting sentencing to testify against Manion, which is portrayed as subornation of perjury to an extent. The first suggests that the defendant may be concealing the truth and manipulating his story in order to obtain the best possible verdict, and the latter that the prosecution dangled a possible lighter sentence through plea bargain as an incentive to perjury.

== Reception and legacy ==
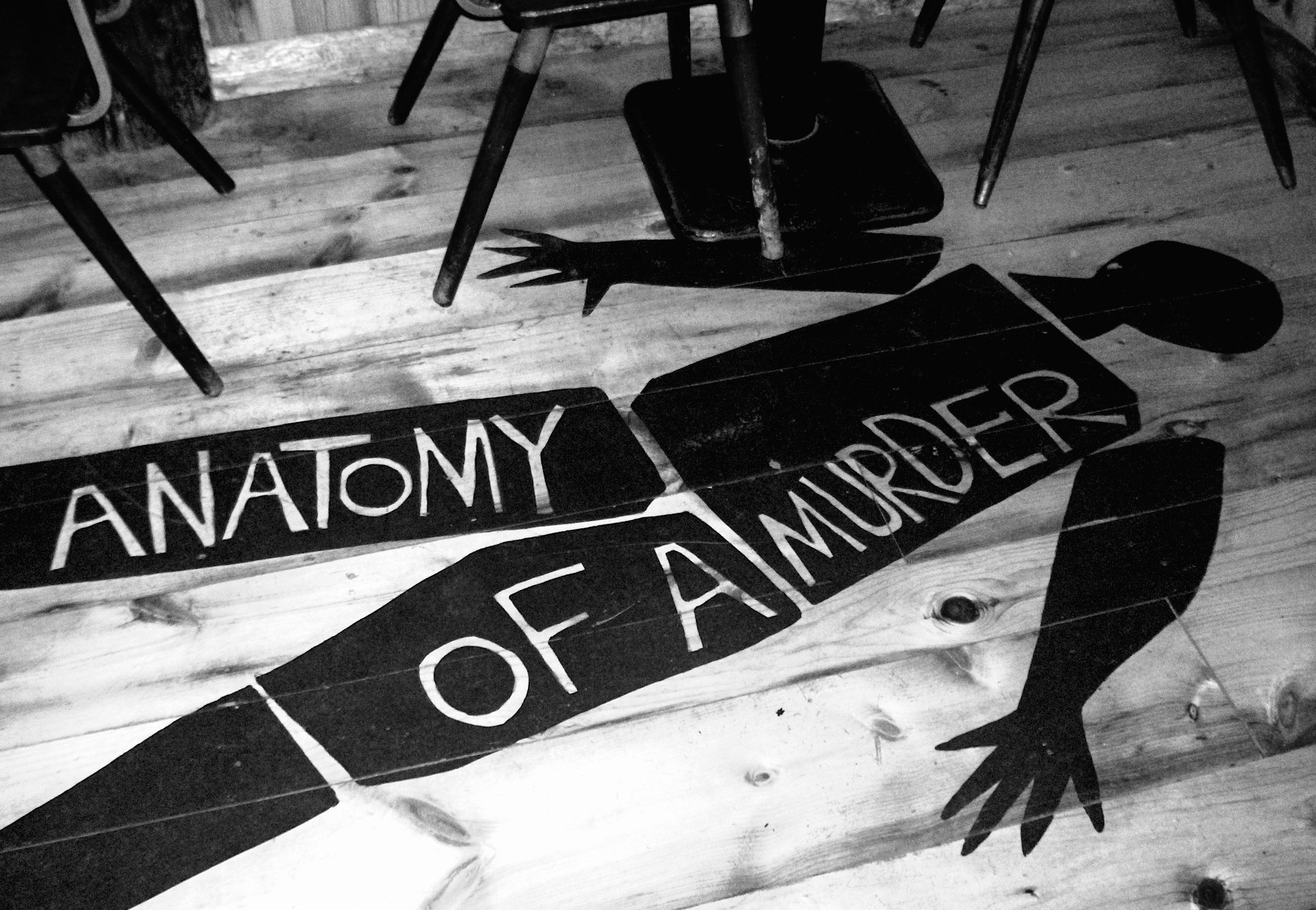
Graphic on the floor of the Lumberjack Tavern denoting where the real-life victim's body fell. The illustration is a reference to the Saul Bass opening sequence of the film.

The language used during the film startled Chicago Mayor Richard J. Daley, and his police commissioner. As a result, the film was temporarily banned in the heavily Catholic city. Preminger filed a motion in federal court in Illinois and the mayor's decision was overturned. The film was allowed to be exhibited after the court determined that the clinical language during the trial was realistic and appropriate within the film's context. Variety claimed that the film contained words never before heard in American films with the Motion Picture Production Code seal such as "contraceptive", (sexual) "climax" and "spermatogenesis".

In another federal lawsuit in Chicago, the daughter of the real-life murder victim from the 1952 case sued Dell Publishing and Columbia Pictures in July 1960 for libel over accusations that the book and movie "followed [the actual trial] too closely" and portrayed the two women in an unflattering light; the suit was dismissed less than a year later in May 1961.

Anatomy of a Murder has been well received by members of the legal and educational professions. In 1989, the American Bar Association rated this as one of the 12 best trial films of all time. In addition to its plot and musical score, the article noted: "The film's real highlight is its ability to demonstrate how a legal defense is developed in a difficult case. How many trial films would dare spend so much time watching lawyers do what many lawyers do most (and enjoy least) – research?" The film has also been used as a teaching tool in law schools, as it encompasses (from the defense standpoint) all of the basic stages in the U.S. criminal justice system from client interview and arraignment through trial. The film was listed as No. 4 of 25 "Greatest Legal Movies" by the American Bar Association.

The film grossed an estimated $11 million generating $5.5 million in theatrical rentals in the U.S. and Canada. It earned rentals of $8 million worldwide.

Film critics have noted the moral ambiguity, where a small town lawyer triumphs by guile, stealth and trickery. The film is frank and direct. Language and sexual themes are explicit, at variance with the times (and other films) when it was produced. The black and white palette is seen as a complement to Michigan's harsh Upper Peninsula landscape. The film is "made in black-and-white but full of local color".

Bosley Crowther, film critic for The New York Times said, "After watching an endless succession of courtroom melodramas that have more or less transgressed the bounds of human reason and the rules of advocacy, it is cheering and fascinating to see one that hews magnificently to a line of dramatic but reasonable behavior and proper procedure in a court. Such a one is Anatomy of a Murder, which opened at the Criterion and the Plaza yesterday. It is the best courtroom melodrama this old judge has ever seen... . Outside of the fact that this drama gets a little tiring in spots—in its two hours and forty minutes, most of which is spent in court—it is well nigh flawless as a picture of an American court at work, of small-town American characters and of the average sordidness of crime."

Time felt that it was well-paced, well-acted, and that the explicit language was warranted within the film's context.

In June 2008, the American Film Institute revealed AFI's 10 Top 10, the best 10 films in 10 "classic" American film genres, after polling over 1,500 people from the creative community. Anatomy of a Murder was selected as the seventh best film in the courtroom drama genre.

The February 2020 issue of New York Magazine selected Anatomy of a Murder as among "The Best Movies That Lost Best Picture at the Oscars."

Rotten Tomatoes, a review aggregator, reports that 100% of 49 surveyed critics gave the film a positive review; the average rating was 8.9/10. The site's consensus states, "One of cinema's greatest courtroom dramas, Anatomy of a Murder is tense, thought-provoking, and brilliantly acted, with great performances from James Stewart and George C. Scott."

=== Awards and nominations ===
Award	Category	Nominee(s)	Result	Ref.
Academy Awards	Best Motion Picture	Otto Preminger	Nominated	
Academy Awards	Best Actor	James Stewart	Nominated	
Academy Awards	Best Supporting Actor	Arthur O'Connell	Nominated	
Academy Awards	Best Supporting Actor	George C. Scott	Nominated	
Academy Awards	Best Screenplay – Based on Material from Another Medium	Wendell Mayes	Nominated	
Academy Awards	Best Cinematography – Black-and-White	Sam Leavitt	Nominated	
Academy Awards	Best Film Editing	Louis R. Loeffler	Nominated	
British Academy Film Awards	Best Film from any Source	Otto Preminger	Nominated	
British Academy Film Awards	Best Foreign Actor	James Stewart	Nominated	
British Academy Film Awards	Most Promising Newcomer to Film	Joseph N. Welch	Nominated	
Directors Guild of America Awards	Outstanding Directorial Achievement in Motion Pictures	Otto Preminger	Nominated	
Golden Globe Awards	Best Motion Picture – Drama		Nominated	
Golden Globe Awards	Best Actress in a Motion Picture – Drama	Lee Remick	Nominated	
Golden Globe Awards	Best Supporting Actor – Motion Picture	Joseph N. Welch	Nominated	
Golden Globe Awards	Best Director – Motion Picture	Otto Preminger	Nominated	
Grammy Awards	Best Musical Composition First Recorded and Released in 1959 (more than 5 minutes duration)	Anatomy of a Murder – Duke Ellington	Won	
Grammy Awards	Best Soundtrack Album – Background Score from a Motion Picture or Television	Anatomy of a Murder – Duke Ellington	Won	
Grammy Awards	Best Performance by an Orchestra – for Dancing	Anatomy of a Murder – Duke Ellington	Won	
Laurel Awards	Top Drama		Won	
Laurel Awards	Top Male Dramatic Performance	James Stewart	Won	
Laurel Awards	Top Male Supporting Performance	Arthur O'Connell	Won	
Laurel Awards	Top Female Supporting Performance	Eve Arden	5th Place	
National Board of Review Awards	Top Ten Films		3rd Place	
National Film Preservation Board	National Film Registry		Inducted	
New York Film Critics Circle Awards	Best Actor	James Stewart	Won	
New York Film Critics Circle Awards	Best Screenplay	Wendell Mayes	Won	
Online Film & Television Association Awards	Hall of Fame – Motion Picture		Inducted	
Venice International Film Festival	Golden Lion	Otto Preminger	Nominated	
Venice International Film Festival	Best Actor	James Stewart	Won	
Writers Guild of America Awards	Best Written American Drama	Wendell Mayes	Nominated	

==== Other Honors ====
American Film Institute Lists:

- AFI's 100 Years...100 Movies: Nominated
- AFI's 100 Years...100 Thrills: Nominated
- AFI's 100 Years of Film Scores: Nominated
- AFI's 10 Top 10: #7 Courtroom Drama

Anatomy of a Murder was one of 25 films added to the National Film Registry by the Library of Congress in 2012.

== Soundtrack ==
Anatomy of a Murder

Soundtrack album by Duke Ellington
- Released: 1959
- Recorded: May 29 and June 1–2, 1959
- Studios: Radio Recorders, Los Angeles
- Genre: Jazz
- Label: Columbia

Duke Ellington chronology
Side by Side (1959)	Anatomy of a Murder (1959)	Live at the Blue Note (1959)

The jazz score of Anatomy of a Murder was composed by Duke Ellington and Billy Strayhorn and played by Ellington's orchestra. Several of Ellington band's sidemen, including Jimmy Hamilton, Jimmy Johnson, Ray Nance, and Jimmy Woode appear, and Ellington himself plays the character Pie Eye.

Mervyn Cooke, in the History of Film Music, asserts that despite being heard "in bits and pieces" the score "contains some of his most evocative and eloquent music... and beckons with the alluring scent of a femme fatale." Including small pieces by Billy Strayhorn, film historians recognize it "as a landmark — the first significant Hollywood film music by African Americans comprising non-diegetic music, that is, music whose source is not visible or implied by action in the film, like an on-screen band." The score avoids cultural stereotypes which previously characterized jazz scores and "rejected a strict adherence to visuals in ways that presaged the New Wave cinema of the '60s."

The soundtrack album, containing 13 tracks, was released by Columbia Records on May 29, 1959. A CD was released on April 28, 1995, and reissued by Sony in a deluxe edition in 1999.

=== Reception ===
Detroit Free Press music critic Mark Stryker concluded: "Though indispensable, I think the score is too sketchy to rank in the top echelon among Ellington-Strayhorn masterpiece suites like Such Sweet Thunder and The Far East Suite, but its most inspired moments are their equal." (Note: The score employs a "handful of themes, endlessly recombined and re-orchestrated. Ellington never wrote a melody more seductive than the hip-swaying "Flirtibird", featuring the "irresistibly salacious tremor" by Johnny Hodges on the alto saxophone." A stalking back-beat barely contains the simmering violence of the main title music" The score is heavily dipped in "the scent of the blues and Ellington's orchestra bursts with color.")

The AllMusic review by Bruce Eder called it "a virtuoso jazz score—moody, witty, sexy, and—in its own quiet way – playful".

Ellington's score won three Grammy Awards in 1959: Best Performance by a Dance Band, Best New Musical Composition, and Best Soundtrack Album.

Professional ratings
Review scores
Source	Rating
AllMusic	3/5 stars
The Penguin Guide to Jazz Recordings	3/4 stars
The Rolling Stone Jazz Record Guide	4/5 stars

== Stage adaptation ==
After Traver's novel was published, St. Martin's Press planned to have it adapted for the stage, intending a Broadway production, which would then be made into a film. Before he died in December 1957, John Van Druten wrote a rough draft of the play adaptation. Some time after that, the publisher then made the film rights available, and these were purchased by Otto Preminger.

Eventually, Traver's book was adapted for the stage in 1963 by Elihu Winer. The written play version of Anatomy of a Murder was published 1964 by Samuel French, Inc. The play premiered at the Mill Run Theater in suburban Chicago on August 17, 1965, with John Voelker, family and friends present.

== References in media and popular culture ==
On June 29, 2009, journalist and filmmaker John Pepin debuted Anatomy '59: The Making of a Classic Motion Picture on public television stations across the state of Michigan. The anchor station for those broadcasts was WNMU-TV in Marquette, Michigan. The documentary reviews the original incident that spawned the bestselling book Anatomy of a Murder by Robert Traver and the making of Otto Preminger's motion picture. Pepin's documentary debuted on the 50th anniversary of the world premiere of "Anatomy of a Murder" in Ishpeming and Marquette, Michigan; the date was also the birthday of John Voelker. Pepin grew up on Barnum Street in Ishpeming, the same street where Voelker lived and where the Mather Inn was located, which is where the stars of Preminger's film stayed during production. Anatomy '59 features interviews with Anatomy of a Murder actors still alive in 2009, including Ben Gazzara, Kathryn Grant-Crosby, Orson Bean and Don Ross.

== See also ==
- List of American films of 1959
- Mather Inn, hotel where the cast and crew stayed during filming, and site where Ellington wrote the score.
- List of homicides in Michigan
