= Red Baron Records =

American jazz record label (1991–1996)

Red Baron Records was a jazz record company and label founded by Bob Thiele around 1991.

The Bob Thiele Collective, an all-star group, recorded three albums for the label, which Thiele produced. Other new recordings included music by John Hicks, Steve Marcus, David Murray, Ali Ryerson, and McCoy Tyner. Red Baron's reissues included albums by Ruby Braff, Paul Desmond, Earl Hines, Mel Lewis, and the Modern Jazz Quartet. Its list of previously unreleased material included Duke Ellington and Billy Strayhorn. Red Baron folded in 1996 when Bob Thiele died.

== Discography ==
Red Baron issued compact discs from 1991–1993.

Catalog No.	Artist	Title	Notes
48629	Teresa Brewer with Friends	Memories of Louis	
48630	McCoy Tyner	44th Street Suite	
48631	Duke Ellington	Hot Summer Dance	Recorded live in 1960
48632	The Bob Thiele Collective	Sunrise Sunset	
48850	Teresa Brewer	Softly I Swing	
48851	Ali Ryerson	Blue Flute	
48852	David Murray Quartet	Black & Black	
48854	Earl "Fatha" Hines	Reunion in Brussels	
52759	Duke Ellington	My People	Reissue of 1963 Contact LP
52760	Billy Strayhorn	Lush Life	Compilation of 1964/65 recordings
52761	John Hicks	Crazy for You	
52445	The Bob Thiele Collective	Louis Satchmo	
52908	Steve Marcus	Steve Marcus & 2o1	
53224	David Murray	MX	
53748	John Hicks	Lover Man: A Tribute to Billie Holiday	
53749	Ruby Braff	Very Sinatra	
53750	Clark Terry	What a Wonderful World for Louis and Duke	
53751	Steve Marcus	Smile	
53752	Mel Lewis & The Jazz Orchestra	Live at the Village Vanguard	
53821	Various Artists	The Red Baron Jazz Sampler	
57329	Teresa Brewer	The Songs of Harry Warren	
57330	Ali Ryerson	I'll Be Back	
57334	Al Cohn and Al Porcino	Al Cohn Meets Al Porcino	
57335	The Bob Thiele Collective	Lion-Hearted	
57336	David Murray	Jazzosaurus Rex	
57337	Paul Desmond and the Modern Jazz Quartet	Paul Desmond & The Modern Jazz Quartet	
57338	Jackie Cain and Roy Kral	Sondheim	
57756	Eddie Lawrence	The Jazzy Old Philosopher	
57758	David Murray	Saxmen	
57759	John Lewis	Kansas City Breaks	
