= Blues in Orbit =

Studio album by Duke Ellington
- Released: 1960
- Recorded: February 4 & 12, 1958; February 25, December 2 & 3, 1959
- Studio: Radio Recorders, Los Angeles; Columbia 30th Street, New York
- Genre: Jazz
- Label: Columbia

Duke Ellington chronology
| Festival Session (1959) | Blues in Orbit (1960) | The Nutcracker Suite (1960) |

Blues in Orbit is an album by American pianist, composer and bandleader Duke Ellington, recorded for the Columbia label in 1959 and released in 1960.

The original liner notes by Teo Macero described this album as primarily a blues album (as most of the track titles indicate). The album was re-released on CD in 2004 with bonus tracks including alternate takes and tracks from earlier sessions.

== Reception ==
Professional ratings
Review scores
| Source | Rating |
|---|---|
| AllMusic | 4/5 stars |
| The Penguin Guide to Jazz Recordings | 3.5/4 stars |

The AllMusic reviewer Bruce Eder stated: "Blues in Orbit lacks the intellectual cachet of the suites and concept pieces that loomed large in Ellington's recordings of this period, but it's an album worth tracking down, if only to hear the band run through a lighter side of its sound. Indeed, it captures the essence of a late-night recording date that was as much a loose jam as a formal studio date, balancing the spontaneity of the former and the technical polish of the latter".

== Track listing ==
All compositions by Duke Ellington except as indicated

1. "Three J's Blues" (Jimmy Hamilton) – 2:54
2. "Smada" (Ellington, Billy Strayhorn) – 2:38
3. "Pie Eye's Blues" – 3:27
4. "Sweet and Pungent" (Strayhorn) – 4:03
5. "C Jam Blues" (Ellington, Barney Bigard) – 4:52
6. "In a Mellow Tone" (Ellington, Milt Gabler) – 2:43
7. "Blues in Blueprint" – 3:43
8. "The Swingers Get the Blues, Too" (Ellington, Matthew Gee) – 3:09
9. "The Swinger's Jump" – 3:53
10. "Blues in Orbit" (Ellington, Strayhorn) – 2:29
11. "Villes Ville Is the Place, Man" – 2:33
12. "Track 360" – 2:03 Bonus track on CD reissue
13. "Sentimental Lady" – 4:02 Bonus track on CD reissue
14. "Brown Penny" (Ellington, John La Touche) – 3:02 Bonus track on CD reissue
15. "Pie Eye's Blues" [alternate take] – 3:32 Bonus track on CD reissue
16. "Sweet and Pungent" [alternate take] (Strayhorn) – 3:52 Bonus track on CD reissue
17. "The Swinger's Jump" [alternate take] (Ellington) – 3:51 Bonus track on CD reissue
18. "Blues in Orbit" [alternate take] (Strayhorn) – 2:39 Bonus track on CD reissue
19. "Track 360" [alternate take] – 2:01 Bonus track on CD reissue

Recorded at Radio Recorders, Los Angeles, on February 4, 1958 (tracks 12 & 19) and February 12, 1958 (tracks 10 & 18) and at Columbia 30th Street Studio, New York, on February 25, 1959 (track 11), December 2, 1959 (tracks 1, 3–5 & 13–16), and December 3, 1959 (tracks 2, 6–9 & 17).

== Personnel ==
- Duke Ellington – piano (tracks 1, 3–6 & 8–19)
- Billy Strayhorn – piano (tracks 2 & 7)
- Ray Nance – trumpet, violin
- Cat Anderson, Shorty Baker, Clark Terry – trumpet (tracks 10–12, 18 & 19)
- Fats Ford – trumpet (track 11)
- Britt Woodman – trombone
- Matthew Gee, Booty Wood – trombone (tracks 1–9 & 13–17)
- Quentin Jackson – trombone (tracks 10–12, 18 & 19)
- John Sanders – valve trombone (tracks 10–12, 18 & 19)
- Jimmy Hamilton – clarinet, tenor saxophone
- Johnny Hodges – alto saxophone (tracks 1–9, 11 & 13–17)
- Russell Procope – alto saxophone, clarinet
- Paul Gonsalves – tenor saxophone
- Harry Carney – baritone saxophone
- Jimmy Woode – bass
- Jimmy Johnson – drums (tracks 1–9 & 13–17)
- Sam Woodyard – drums (tracks 10–12, 18 & 19)
