= Perdido (song) =

Jazz standard composed by Juan Tizol

- Juan Tizol in 1943

Song
- Written: 1941 (music), 1944 (lyrics)
- Published: 1942 by Tempo Music
- Composer: Juan Tizol
- Lyricists: Ervin Drake, Hans Lengsfelder

"Perdido" is a jazz standard composed by Juan Tizol, a longtime member of Duke Ellington's orchestra. It was first recorded for radio transcription on December 3, 1941, by Duke Ellington. The Duke Ellington Orchestra recorded it again, this time for Victor, on January 21, 1942. In 1944, Ervin Drake and Hans Lengsfelder were hired to write lyrics for the song.

== Background ==
Although the song lyrics do not refer to Perdido Street in New Orleans, the composition takes its name from the legendary street in the Storyville section of New Orleans. Perdido is a Spanish word that means "lost", but also "sloppy" or "indecent".

== Ella Fitzgerald recording ==
"Perdido" was not usually sung with the Ellington band, the exception being Ella Fitzgerald on her 1957 album Ella Fitzgerald Sings the Duke Ellington Songbook.

== Other recordings ==
Many others recorded the song, including: Ben Webster, Sarah Vaughan, Dinah Washington, Art Tatum, Quincy Jones, The Charlie Parker Quintet, Dave Brubeck and Charles Mingus.
