= Juan Tizol =

Puerto Rican jazz trombonist (1900–1984)

- Tizol in 1943

Background information
- Born: Juan Tizol Martínez; January 22, 1900; Vega Baja, Puerto Rico, U.S.
- Died: April 23, 1984 (aged 84) Inglewood, California, U.S.
- Genres: Jazz; swing; Latin jazz
- Occupations: Musician; composer
- Instrument: Valve trombone
- Works: "Caravan"; "Perdido"
- Years active: 1920–1960s
- Formerly of: Duke Ellington; Harry James

Juan Tizol Martínez (January 22, 1900 – April 23, 1984) was a Puerto Rican jazz trombonist and composer. He is best known as a member of Duke Ellington's big band and for writing the jazz standards "Caravan", "Pyramid", and "Perdido".

== Biography ==
Tizol was born in Vega Baja, Puerto Rico. Music was a large part of his life from an early age. His first instrument was the violin, but he soon switched to the valve trombone, the instrument he played throughout his career. His musical training came mostly from his uncle Manuel Tizol, the director of the municipal band and symphony in San Juan. In his youth, Tizol played in his uncle's band and also gained experience by playing in local operas, ballets, and dance bands. In 1920, he joined a band that was traveling to the United States to work in Washington, D.C.; the group made it there as stowaways and established residence at the Howard Theatre, where they played for touring shows and silent films. At Howard, they were hired to play in small jazz or dance groups. This is where Tizol first met Duke Ellington.

Tizol joined Ellington's band in mid-1929. Arthur Whetsel, a trumpeter with whom Tizol played in the White Brothers' Band, made the recommendation. Tizol sat beside Tricky Sam Nanton in the two-man trombone section and became the fifth voice in the brass section of Ellington's orchestra. This opened up new possibilities for Ellington's writing, as he could now write for trombones as a section instead of just having them play with the trumpets. Tizol's rich, warm tone also blended well with the saxophone section, so he often carried the melody with the saxophones. Along with his distinctive sound, Tizol was known as one of the band's best sight-readers and overall musicians. He played with great accuracy and was considered the solid rock of the trombone section. He was not a significant improviser, but was often featured playing written-out solos that displayed his technique and agility.

Tizol with Duke Ellington's orchestra at the Hurricane Ballroom, New York City, 1943

Tizol made many contributions to Ellington's band in the 1930s and '40s. One of his major roles was copying parts from Ellington's scores. Tizol extracted parts needed for upcoming shows. He also composed for the band. His best-known compositions, "Caravan" (1936) and "Perdido" (1941), are jazz standards. Mercer Ellington said that Tizol had derived the melody to "Caravan" from his days studying music in Puerto Rico, where they could not afford much sheet music, so the teacher turned the music upside down after they had learned to play it right side up. This technique became known as "inverting". Tizol was responsible for bringing Latin influences into the Ellington band with other compositions such as "Moonlight Fiesta", "Jubilesta", and "Conga Brava".

Tizol left Ellington's band in 1944 to play in the Harry James Orchestra, which he mainly decided as it allowed him to spend more time with his wife, Rosebud, who lived in Los Angeles. In 1951, he returned to Ellington, along with James's drummer and alto saxophonist, in what became known as the "James raid". However, he returned to James's band in 1953 and remained predominantly on the West Coast for the rest of his career. In Los Angeles, he played sporadically with James, Nelson Riddle, Louie Bellson, and on Nat King Cole's television show. Tizol returned very briefly to Ellington's band in the early 1960s but retired in Los Angeles. He died of a heart attack at the age of 84 on April 23, 1984, in Inglewood, California, two years after the death of his wife.

== Discography ==
=== As sideman ===
With Louie Bellson

- Journey into Love (Norgran, 1955) – with arrangements by Buddy Baker
- Drumorama! (Verve, 1957)
- Music, Romance and Especially Love (Verve, 1958)
- The Brilliant Bellson Sound (Verve, 1960)
- Louis Bellson Swings Jule Styne (Verve, 1960)
- Live in Stereo June 28, 1959, at the Flamingo Hotel, Vol. 1 (Jazz Hour, 1992)

With Duke Ellington

- Ellington Uptown (Columbia, 1953)
- Seattle Concert (RCA Victor, 1954)
- Ellington '55 (Capitol, 1955)
- Ellington Showcase (Capitol, 1955)
- Liberian Suite and a Tone Parallel to Harlem (Columbia, 1956)
- Piano in the Background (Columbia, 1960)
- Selections from Peer Gynt Suites Nos. 1 & 2 and Suite Thursday (Columbia, 1960)
- The Nutcracker Suite (Columbia, 1960)
- First Time! The Count Meets the Duke (Columbia, 1962) – with Count Basie
- Paris Blues (United Artists, 1961)

With Harry James

- Dancing in Person with Harry James at the Hollywood Palladium (Columbia, 1954)
- Soft Lights, Sweet Trumpet (Columbia, 1954)
- Harry James in Hi-fi (Capitol, 1955)
- Jazz Session (Columbia, 1955)
- Juke Box Jamboree (Columbia, 1955)
- More Harry James in Hi-fi (Capitol, 1956)
- Requests On-the-Road (MGM, 1962)

With others

- Benny Carter, Cosmopolite (Norgran, 1956)
- Nat King Cole, The Piano Style of Nat King Cole (Capitol, 1956)
- Nat King Cole, After Midnight (Capitol, 1957)
- Maxwell Davis, Compositions of Duke Ellington and Others (Crown, 1960)
- Ella Fitzgerald, Get Happy! (Verve, 1959)
- Ella Fitzgerald, Ella Fitzgerald Sings the Irving Berlin Song Book, Vol. 1 (Verve, 1958)
- Peggy Lee, The Man I Love (Capitol, 1957)
- Peggy Lee, Jump for Joy (Capitol, 1958)
- Frank Sinatra, Frank Sinatra Sings for Only the Lonely (Capitol, 1958)
