= Duke Ellington at the Alhambra =

Live album by Duke Ellington
- Released: 2002
- Recorded: October 29, 1958
- Venues: Alhambra Theater, Paris
- Genre: Jazz
- Label: Pablo

Duke Ellington chronology
Jazz at the Plaza Vol. II (1958)	Duke Ellington at the Alhambra (2002)	Jazz Party (1959)

Duke Ellington at the Alhambra is a live album by American pianist, composer and bandleader Duke Ellington recorded in 1958 at the Alhambra Theater, Paris, and released on the Pablo label in 2002.

== Reception ==
The AllMusic reviewer Ken Dryden stated: "Much of the music on this CD from Duke Ellington's 1958 Paris concerts is familiar to collectors from its appearance on various European bootleg labels, but Pablo does a better job arranging and annotating this music, which was recorded by Radio France with permission".

Professional ratings
Review scores
Source	Rating
AllMusic	4/5 stars
The Penguin Guide to Jazz Recordings	3.5/4 stars

== Track listing ==
All compositions by Duke Ellington except as indicated

1. "Take the 'A' Train" (Billy Strayhorn) – 3:21
2. "Medley: Black and Tan Fantasy/Creole Love Call/The Mooche" – 8:53
3. "Newport Up" (Ellington, Strayhorn) – 5:10
4. "Tenderly" (Walter Gross, Jack Lawrence) – 5:43
5. "Juniflip" – 4:19
6. "Frustration" – 4:18
7. "Rockin' in Rhythm" (Harry Carney, Ellington, Irving Mills) – 6:03
8. "Jeep's Blues" (Ellington, Johnny Hodges) – 3:31
9. "All of Me" (Gerald Marks, Seymour Simons) – 2:47
10. "Things Ain't What They Used to Be" (Mercer Ellington) – 4:07
11. "Jam With Sam" – 3:52
12. "Hi Fi Fo Fum" – 7:02
13. "Diminuendo and Crescendo in Blue" – 10:41

Recorded at the Alhambra Theater, Paris, on October 29, 1958.

== Personnel ==
- Duke Ellington – piano
- Cat Anderson, Shorty Baker, Ray Nance, Clark Terry – trumpet
- Quentin Jackson, Britt Woodman – trombone
- John Sanders – valve trombone
- Jimmy Hamilton – clarinet, tenor saxophone
- Russell Procope – alto saxophone, clarinet
- Johnny Hodges – alto saxophone
- Paul Gonsalves – tenor saxophone
- Harry Carney – baritone saxophone
- Jimmy Woode – bass
- Sam Woodyard – drums
