= Jazz at the Plaza Vol. II =

Live album by Duke Ellington
- Released: 1973
- Recorded: September 9, 1958
- Genre: Jazz
- Label: Columbia

Duke Ellington chronology
Newport 1958 (1958)	Jazz at the Plaza Vol. II (1973)	Duke Ellington at the Alhambra (1958)

Jazz at the Plaza Vol. II is a live album by American pianist, composer and bandleader Duke Ellington recorded in 1958 at a party for Columbia Records and released on the label in 1973. The Miles Davis Sextet was also recorded at the same event and released as the first volume of Jazz at the Plaza.

== Reception ==
The AllMusic reviewer Scott Yanow stated the album features "Duke Ellington's orchestra during a prime period... Excellent music".

Professional ratings
Review scores
Source	Rating
AllMusic	4/5 stars
The Rolling Stone Jazz Record Guide	3/5 stars

== Track listing ==
1. "Toot Suite: Red Garter" (Duke Ellington, Billy Strayhorn) – 3:47
2. "Toot Suite: Red Shoes" (Ellington, Strayhorn) – 4:08
3. "Toot Suite: Red Carpet" (Ellington, Strayhorn) – 2:26
4. "Toot Suite: Ready Go" (Ellington, Strayhorn) – 4:11
5. "Jones" (Ellington, Pauline Reddon) – 1:25
6. "El Gato" (Cat Anderson) – 4:00
7. "All of Me" (Gerald Marks, Seymour Simons) – 2:29
8. "Go Away Blues/Hello, Little Girl/Love to Hear My Baby Call My Name" (Ellington) – 6:40
9. "When Your Lover Has Gone/(Hush Now) Don't Explain" (Einar Aaron Swan/Billie Holiday, Arthur Herzog Jr.) – 5:09
10. "Take the 'A' Train" (Strayhorn) – 2:49

- Recorded at the Plaza Hotel Persian Room, New York, on September 9, 1958.

== Personnel ==
- Duke Ellington – piano (tracks 1–8 & 10)
- Cat Anderson (tracks 1–8 & 10), Shorty Baker (tracks 1–8 & 10), Buck Clayton (track 9), Ray Nance (tracks 1–8 & 10), Clark Terry (tracks 1–8 & 10) – trumpet
- Quentin Jackson, Britt Woodman – trombone (tracks 1–8 & 10)
- John Sanders – valve trombone (tracks 1–8 & 10)
- Jimmy Hamilton – clarinet, tenor saxophone (tracks 1–8 & 10)
- Russell Procope – alto saxophone, clarinet (tracks 1–8 & 10)
- Johnny Hodges, Bill Graham – alto saxophone (tracks 1–8 & 10)
- Paul Gonsalves – tenor saxophone (tracks 1–8 & 10)
- Harry Carney – baritone saxophone (tracks 1–8 & 10)
- Mal Waldron – piano (track 9)
- Jimmy Woode – bass
- Sam Woodyard – drums
- Jimmy Rushing (track 8), Billie Holiday (track 9) – vocals
