= Masterpieces by Ellington =

1951 album by Duke Ellington

Studio album by Duke Ellington
- Released: September 1951
- Recorded: December 18, 1950; Bonus tracks: August 7 & December 11, 1951
- Genres: Jazz; swing; big band
- Length: 47:05
- Labels: Columbia Masterworks (1951); ML 4418; Columbia (1956); CL 825

Duke Ellington chronology
Great Times (1950)	Masterpieces by Ellington (1951)	Ellington Uptown (1951)

Alternative 1956 cover

Masterpieces by Ellington is the first LP album by American pianist, composer, and bandleader Duke Ellington, recorded for the Columbia Records in 1950. It was one of the earliest 12-inch LPs to take advantage of the extended time available and consisted of four tracks, three of them "concert arrangements" of Ellington standards and one, "The Tattooed Bride", a recent tone poem.

== Content ==
The album features full-length versions of Ellington's classics "Mood Indigo" (1930), "Sophisticated Lady" (1933), and "Solitude" (1934). No longer constrained by the limitations of 78s, these arrangements range from 8 to 15 minutes in length. The first two feature vocals by Eve Duke, recording under the name Yvonne Lanauze, and the third includes a climactic solo by trombonist Lawrence Brown. The newest composition, "The Tattooed Bride" (1948), gives extended space to clarinetist Jimmy Hamilton in almost concerto-like fashion. The lengthy arrangements were created by both Ellington and his longtime collaborator Billy Strayhorn.

== Reception ==
Jazz critic Gary Giddins called the album "One of the first genuinely innovative 12-inch LPs". He noted that "Ellington eschewed the suite format in favor of continuous long-form works that reflected a liberation made possible by the LP. The vividly languorous 15-minute 'Mood Indigo' (on Masterpieces) exemplifies Ellington's newfound freedom."

Ellington biographer John Edward Hasse noted that "Mood Indigo" in this updated version "goes through several meters (one section is in waltz time), three keys, and effective contrasts in sonorities, densities, and timbres. What variety Ellington and Strayhorn could manage from the sixteen-piece orchestra and from a familiar short song!" He also noted that "'The Tattooed Bride' is considered by some critics as one of Ellington's most effective extended works."

The AllMusic review by Bruce Eder stated: "For the first time in his recording career, Ellington was able to forego the three-minutes-and-change restrictions in running time of the 78-rpm disc — he and the band rose to the occasion."

== Release history ==
The original 1951 release under the Columbia Masterworks banner featured a red cover which was replaced by the more modern blue cover in 1956. The album was re-released on CD in 2004 with additional bonus tracks recorded at later sessions.

Professional ratings
Review scores
Source	Rating
AllMusic	4.5/5 stars
The Penguin Guide to Jazz Recordings	3/4 stars
The Rolling Stone Jazz Record Guide	4/5 stars

== Track listing ==
No.	Title	Writer(s)	Length
1.	"Mood Indigo"	Duke Ellington; Barney Bigard; Irving Mills	15:27
2.	"Sophisticated Lady"	Ellington; Mills; Mitchell Parish	11:29
3.	"The Tattooed Bride"	Ellington	11:43
4.	"Solitude"	Ellington; Mills; Eddie DeLange	8:26
Total length:			47:05

Bonus tracks on CD reissue

No.	Title	Writer(s)	Length
5.	"Vagabonds"	Ellington; Juan Tizol; Johnny Burke	3:11
6.	"Smada"	Ellington; Billy Strayhorn	2:48
7.	"Rock Skippin' at the Blue Note"	Ellington; Strayhorn	2:27
Total length:			8:26 55:31

== Personnel ==
- Duke Ellington, Billy Strayhorn – piano
- Cat Anderson (tracks 1–4, 6 & 7), Shorty Baker, Fats Ford (tracks 1–4), Ray Nance, Nelson Williams – trumpet
- Lawrence Brown (tracks 1–4), Tyree Glenn (tracks 1–4), Quentin Jackson, Britt Woodman (tracks 5–7) – trombone
- Mercer Ellington (tracks 1–4) – French horn
- Jimmy Hamilton – clarinet, tenor saxophone
- Johnny Hodges (tracks 1–4), Willie Smith (tracks 5–7) – alto saxophone
- Russell Procope – alto saxophone, clarinet
- Paul Gonsalves – tenor saxophone
- Harry Carney – baritone saxophone, bass clarinet (track 2)
- Wendell Marshall – double bass
- Sonny Greer (tracks 1–4), Louis Bellson (tracks 5–7) – drums
- Eve Duke (credited as Yvonne Lanauze) – vocals
