= Happy Reunion =

Studio album by Duke Ellington
- Released: 1985
- Recorded: March 19, 1956, & June 24, 1958
- Studios: Universal, Chicago
- Genre: Jazz
- Length: 33:35
- Label: Doctor Jazz
- Producers: Duke Ellington & Bill Putnam

Duke Ellington chronology
| The Cosmic Scene (1958) | Happy Reunion (1985) | Newport 1958 (1958) |

Happy Reunion is an album by American pianist, composer and bandleader Duke Ellington recorded in 1956 and 1958 but not released until 1985 on the Doctor Jazz label. The album features two small group sessions led by Ellington and recorded in Chicago.

== Reception ==
Professional ratings
Review scores
| Source | Rating |
|---|---|
| AllMusic | 2.5/5 stars |

The AllMusic review by Scott Yanow stated: "A particular highlight is hearing Gonsalves play 31 choruses on 'Diminuendo and Crescendo in Blue' in this setting."

== Track listing ==
All compositions by Duke Ellington except where noted

1. "Way Back Blues" (Count Basie) – 3:25
2. "Where's the Music?" – 3:11
3. "Rubber Bottom" – 2:48
4. "Play the Blues and Go" – 4:32
5. "In a Mellow Tone" [Take 1] (Ellington, Milt Gabler) – 3:14
6. "In a Mellow Tone" [Take 2] (Ellington, Gabler) – 2:58
7. "Happy Reunion" [Take 1] – 3:26
8. "Happy Reunion" [Take 2] – 2:42
9. "Diminuendo and Crescendo in Blue (The Wailing Interval)" – 7:20
- Recorded at Universal Studios, Chicago, on March 19, 1956 (tracks 1–4) and June 24, 1958 (tracks 5–9).

== Personnel ==
- Duke Ellington – piano
- Clark Terry – trumpet (tracks 1–4)
- John Sanders – valve trombone (tracks 1–4)
- Jimmy Hamilton – clarinet (tracks 1–4)
- Johnny Hodges – alto saxophone (tracks 1–4)
- Paul Gonsalves – tenor saxophone (tracks 5–9)
- Jimmy Woode – bass
- Sam Woodyard – drums
