= Studio Sessions, New York 1962 =

1987 album by Duke Ellington

Studio album by Duke Ellington
- Released: 1987
- Recorded: July 25 and September 12–13, 1962
- Studio: A & R, New York City
- Genre: Jazz
- Label: LMR

Duke Ellington chronology
Duke Ellington Meets Coleman Hawkins (1962)	Studio Sessions, New York 1962 (1987)	Money Jungle (1962)

Studio Sessions, New York 1962 is the third volume of The Private Collection, a series of recordings made by American pianist, composer and bandleader Duke Ellington for his personal collection which was first released on the LMR label in 1987 and later on the Saja label.

== Reception ==
Professional ratings
Review scores
Source	Rating
AllMusic	4/5 stars

The AllMusic review by Scott Yanow awarded the album 4 stars and stated: "One of the strongest in The Private Collection... Recommended".

== Track listing ==
All compositions by Duke Ellington except as indicated

1. "E.S.P." – 4:44
2. "Blue, Too (The Shepherd)" – 4:08
3. "Tune Up" – 3:25
4. "Take It Slow" (Billy Strayhorn) – 2:57
5. "Telstar" – 2:33
6. "To Know You Is to Love You" – 2:32
7. "Like Late" – 3:41
8. "Major" – 4:06
9. "Minor" – 1:58
10. "'G' for Groove" – 4:17
11. "The Lonely Ones" (Ellington, Don George) – 2:54
12. "Monk's Dream" (Thelonious Monk) – 2:26
13. "Frere Monk" – 2:24
14. "Cordon Bleu" – 4:19
15. "New Concerto for Cootie" (Ellington, Elwyn Fraser, Cootie Williams) – 2:32
16. "September 12th Blues" – 5:05

- Recorded at A & R Studio, New York, on July 25, 1962 (tracks 2–5 & 7–10), September 12, 1962 (tracks 1, 6 & 16), September 13, 1962 (tracks 11–15).

== Personnel ==
- Duke Ellington – piano (tracks 1, 4, 5 & 7–16)
- Billy Strayhorn – piano (tracks 4, 5, 7 & 14)
- Ray Nance – cornet (tracks 1, 6 & 11–16)
- Cat Anderson, Bill Berry, Roy Burrowes, Cootie Williams – trumpet (tracks 1, 6, & 11–16)
- Lawrence Brown (tracks 1, 6, & 11–16), Buster Cooper, Britt Woodman (tracks 2–5, 7–10) – trombone
- Chuck Connors – bass trombone
- Jimmy Hamilton – clarinet, tenor saxophone (tracks 1, 6, & 11–16)
- Johnny Hodges – alto saxophone (tracks 1–6 & 11–16)
- Russell Procope – alto saxophone, clarinet (tracks 1, 6, & 11–16)
- Paul Gonsalves – tenor saxophone
- Harry Carney – baritone saxophone (tracks 1–6 & 11–15)
- Aaron Bell – bass
- Sam Woodyard – drums
- Milt Grayson – vocals (tracks 6 & 11)
