= Yale Concert =

1973 live album by Duke Ellington

Live album by Duke Ellington
- Released: 1973
- Recorded: January 26, 1968
- Genre: Jazz
- Label: Fantasy

Duke Ellington chronology
Francis A. & Edward K. (1967)	Yale Concert (1973)	Second Sacred Concert (1968)

Yale Concert is an album by Duke Ellington, recorded at Woolsey Hall, Yale University in New Haven, Connecticut in 1968 and released on the Fantasy label in 1973.

== Reception ==
The AllMusic review by Scott Yanow awarded the album 3 stars and stated "The great Duke Ellington Orchestra was still intact and in its late prime at the time of this performance from 1968. With the death of Billy Strayhorn the year before, Ellington (perhaps sensing his own mortality) accelerated his writing activities, proving that even as he neared 70, he was still at his peak".

Professional ratings
Review scores
Source	Rating
AllMusic	3/5 stars
The Rolling Stone Jazz Record Guide	3/5 stars
The Penguin Guide to Jazz Recordings	2.5/4 stars

== Track listing ==
All compositions by Duke Ellington except as indicated

1. "The Little Purple Flower, Parts 1 & 2" - 10:47
2. "Put-tin" (Ellington/Strayhorn) - 3:58
3. "A Chromatic Love Affair" - 3:58
4. "Boola Boola" (Allan M. Hirsh) - 3:18
5. "A Johnny Hodges Medley: Warm Valley/Drag" (Strayhorn) - 7:59
6. "Salome" (Raymond Fol) - 3:28
7. "Swamp Goo" - 4:33
8. "Up Jump" - 3:08
9. "Take the "A" Train" (Strayhorn) - 3:35

- Recorded at Woolsey Hall, Yale University in New Haven, Connecticut on January 26, 1968.

== Personnel ==
- Duke Ellington – piano
- Cat Anderson, Mercer Ellington, Herb Jones, Cootie Williams – trumpet
- Lawrence Brown, Buster Cooper – trombone
- Chuck Connors – bass trombone
- Russell Procope – alto saxophone, clarinet
- Johnny Hodges – alto saxophone
- Jimmy Hamilton – clarinet, tenor saxophone
- Paul Gonsalves – tenor saxophone
- Harry Carney – baritone saxophone
- Jeff Castleman – bass
- Sam Woodyard – drums
