= Soul Call (Duke Ellington album) =

1967 live album by Duke Ellington

Live album by Duke Ellington
- Released: 1967
- Recorded: July 10–29, 1966, at the Juan-les-Pins/Antibes Jazz Festival, Côte d'Azur
- Genre: Jazz
- Length: 54:41
- Label: Verve
- Producer: Norman Granz

Duke Ellington chronology
Ella and Duke at the Cote D'Azur (1967)	Soul Call (1967)	The Popular Duke Ellington (1961)

Professional ratings
Review scores
Source	Rating
Allmusic	4.5/5 stars
The Penguin Guide to Jazz Recordings	3.5/4 stars

Soul Call is a 1967 live album by Duke Ellington and his orchestra, recorded live at the Juan-les-Pins/Antibes Jazz Festival on the Côte d'Azur. Ella Fitzgerald appeared with Ellington and his band at the same festival, and a more complete version of Ellington's appearance at the festival is documented on the 1998 album Ella and Duke at the Cote D'Azur.

== Track listing ==
1. "La Plus Belle Africaine" (Duke Ellington) – 14:00
2. "West Indian Pancake" (Ellington) – 4:41
3. "Soul Call" (Louie Bellson, Henry Bellson) – 3:09
4. "Skin Deep" (Bellson) – 13:03
5. "Jam with Sam" (Ellington) – 3:38
6. "Sophisticated Lady" (Ellington, Irving Mills, Mitchell Parish) – 4:20 Bonus track on Cd reissue
7. "Wings and Things" (Johnny Hodges) – 3:00 Bonus track on Cd reissue
8. "The Opener" (Ellington) – 3:16 Bonus track on Cd reissue
9. "Caravan" (Ellington, Mills, Juan Tizol) – 6:18 Bonus track on Cd reissue
10. "Kinda Dukish"/"Rockin' in Rhythm" (Ellington)/(Harry Carney, Ellington, Mills) – 5:55 Bonus track on Cd reissue
11. "Such Sweet Thunder" (Ellington, Strayhorn) – 3:36 Bonus track on Cd reissue
12. "Madness in Great Ones" (Ellington, Strayhorn) – 4:42 Bonus track on Cd reissue
13. "Main Stem" (Ellington) – 4:21 Bonus track on Cd reissue
14. "Take the "A" Train" (Strayhorn) – 5:13 Bonus track on Cd reissue

- Recorded at Juan Les Pins on July 26 (track 9), July 27 (tracks 2, 4–6, 8, 10 & 13), July 28 (tracks 1, 3, 11–12 & 14) and July 29 (track 7)

== Personnel ==
=== Performance ===
- Duke Ellington - piano, leader
- Cat Anderson, Mercer Ellington, Herb Jones, Cootie Williams - trumpet
- Lawrence Brown, Buster Cooper - trombone
- Chuck Connors - bass trombone
- Johnny Hodges - alto saxophone
- Russell Procope - alto saxophone, clarinet
- Jimmy Hamilton - tenor saxophone, clarinet
- Paul Gonsalves - tenor saxophone
- Harry Carney - baritone saxophone, clarinet, bass clarinet
- John Lamb - bass
- Sam Woodyard - drums
