= Black, Brown and Beige (1958 album) =

Studio album by Duke Ellington
- Released: 1958
- Recorded: February 4–5 & 11–12, 1958
- Genres: Swing; big band
- Length: 35:42
- Label: Columbia
- Producer: Irving Townsend

Duke Ellington chronology
Live at the 1957 Stratford Festival (1957)	Black, Brown and Beige (1958)	Newport Jazz Festival (1958) (1958)

Professional ratings
Review scores
Source	Rating
AllMusic	4.5/5 stars
DownBeat	5/5 stars
The Penguin Guide to Jazz Recordings	4/4 stars
The Rolling Stone Jazz Record Guide	3/5 stars

Black, Brown and Beige is a 1958 jazz album by Duke Ellington and his orchestra, featuring Mahalia Jackson.

The album is a recording of a revised version of Ellington's Black, Brown and Beige suite, inspired by the experience of African-Americans. After a disappointing critical response to its first performance in 1943, Ellington divided the three-part suite into six shorter sections, leaving in "Come Sunday" and "Work Song", and it is this version that is recorded here.

== Track listing ==
All tracks by Duke Ellington

1. "Part I" – 8:17
2. "Part II" – 6:14
3. "Part III" (a.k.a. Light) – 6:26
4. "Part IV" (a.k.a. Come Sunday) – 7:58
5. "Part V" (a.k.a. Come Sunday) – 3:46
6. "Part VI" (23rd Psalm) – 3:01
  Bonus tracks on re-releases
7. "Track 360" (a.k.a. Trains) (alternative take) – 2:02
8. "Blues in Orbit" (a.k.a. Tender) (alternative take) – 2:36
9. "Part I" (alternative take) – 6:49
10. "Part II" (alternative take) – 6:38
11. "Part III" (alternative take) – 3:08
12. "Part IV" (alternative take) – 2:23
13. "Part V" (alternative take) – 5:51
14. "Part VI" (alternative take) – 1:59
15. "Studio conversation" (Mahalia Swears) – 0:07
16. "Come Sunday" (a cappella) – 5:47
17. "(Pause track)" – 0:06

== Personnel ==
- Duke Ellington – piano
- Cat Anderson, Shorty Baker, Clark Terry – trumpet
- Ray Nance – trumpet & violin
- Quentin Jackson, Britt Woodman – trombone
- John Sanders – valve trombone
- Jimmy Hamilton – clarinet
- Bill Graham – alto saxophone (subbing for Johnny Hodges)
- Russell Procope – clarinet & alto saxophone
- Paul Gonsalves – tenor saxophone
- Harry Carney – baritone saxophone
- Jimmy Woode – bass
- Sam Woodyard – drums
- Mahalia Jackson – vocals
