= Diminuendo and Crescendo in Blue =

1937 composition by Duke Ellington

Song by Duke Ellington
- Written: 1937; 89 years ago
- Songwriter: Duke Ellington

"Diminuendo and Crescendo in Blue" is a jazz composition written in 1937 by Duke Ellington and recorded for the first time on May 15, 1937, by the Duke Ellington Orchestra with Wallace Jones, Cootie Williams (trumpet), Rex Stewart (cornet), Barney Bigard (clarinet), Johnny Hodges, Otto Hardwick (alto saxophone), Lawrence Brown, Joe Nanton (trombone), Harry Carney (clarinet, baritone saxophone), Sonny Greer (drums), Wellman Braud (bass), Freddie Guy (guitar), and Duke Ellington (piano). No tenor saxophone was present in this recording section, nor in "Crescendo in Blue", which was recorded the same day.

In its early form, the two individual pieces, "Diminuendo in Blue" and "Crescendo in Blue", were recorded on opposite sides of a 78 rpm record. The 1956 performance at the Newport Jazz Festival revitalized Ellington's career, making newspaper headlines when seated audience members chaotically began rising to dance and stand on their chairs during Paul Gonsalves's tenor saxophone solo.

== Performances before 1956 ==
In early performances, "Crescendo" was played before "Diminuendo". It was played at the 1938 Randall's Island concert with Ellington playing the interlude on piano. During the mid-1940s, Ellington tried all sorts of pieces between these tunes, particularly in a series of broadcasts he made for the Treasury Department in 1945 and 1946. There are issued recordings of him playing "I Got It Bad (and That Ain't Good)", "Carnegie Blues", "Rocks in My Bed" and "Transblucency" between these two pieces. The last piece was specifically composed as a wordless vocal for Kay Davis. Later that decade, Duke once again tried a piano solo between them.

== 1956 Newport Jazz Festival ==
In what has since become jazz folklore, Gonsalves almost created a riot as he played a tenor sax solo for 27 choruses that aroused the normally seated crowd into a frenzy of dancing, standing on chairs, and rushing the stage. A woman with platinum blond hair in a black evening dress, named Elaine Anderson, jumped from her box seat to start dancing, something she had long wished to do professionally. Anderson’s dancing is often credited with initiating the crowd's ensuing uproar as Gonsalves continued his solo. In later performances, Gonsalves played as many as 60 choruses.

This song, along with the other performances at the festival by Ellington's band, were released as a live recording, which helped revive Ellington's flagging career. Personnel of Newport July 1956 concert were: Clark Terry, Ray Nance, Willie Cook, Cat Anderson (trumpet), Britt Woodman, Quentin Jackson (trombone), Jimmy Hamilton, Paul Gonsalves (tenor saxophone), Johnny Hodges, Russell Procope (alto saxophone), Harry Carney (baritone saxophone), Jimmy Woode (bass), Sam Woodyard (drums), and Duke Ellington (piano). "The Newport Jazz Festival Suite" and "Jeep's Blues" were rerecorded on July 9, 1956, in Columbia's New York studio. However, on every issue of Ellington at Newport, "Diminuendo and Crescendo in Blue" is from the Newport stage, with varying sound quality.

== 1958 Alhambra Concert ==
On October 29, 1958, Ellington gave a concert at the Alhambra Theatre in Paris, France (Duke Ellington at the Alhambra, Columbia Rec. 1959). This is a faster version of the classical 1937 recording. Personnel of this recording session were the same as 1956 Newport Concert, plus Booty Wood on trombone.

== 1966 recording ==
There is a later recording of "Diminuendo In Blue/Blow by Blow" on the album Ella and Duke at the Cote D'Azur, recorded live in Juan-les-Pins on the French Riviera between June 26 and July 29, 1966, for Verve Records. Paul Gonsalves is featured on the "Blow by Blow" section.
