= All Star Road Band Volume 2 =

Live album by Duke Ellington
- Released: 1985
- Recorded: May 31, 1964
- Venues: Holiday Ballroom, Chicago, IL
- Genre: Jazz
- Labels: Doctor Jazz; W2X 40012
- Producer: Bob Thiele

Duke Ellington chronology
Ellington '65 (1964)	All Star Road Band Volume 2 (1985)	Duke Ellington Plays Mary Poppins (1964)

All Star Road Band Volume 2 is a live album by American pianist, composer and bandleader Duke Ellington recorded at the Holiday Ballroom in Chicago for radio broadcast and first released as a double LP on Bob Thiele's Doctor Jazz label in 1985.

== Reception ==
Professional ratings
Review scores
Source	Rating
Allmusic	4/5 stars

The Allmusic review by Scott Yanow stated "This two-LP set finds Duke Ellington's orchestra in surprisingly inspired form playing at a dance in Chicago ... the all-star ensemble brings new life to the potentially tired repertoire, introduces some relatively new arrangements and seems to have a good time playing for an enthusiastic audience. Excellent music".

== Track listing ==
All compositions by Duke Ellington except where noted

Disc 1

1. "Mood Indigo" (Ellington, Barney Bigard, Irving Mills) – 6:45
2. "Satin Doll" (Ellington, Billy Strayhorn, Johnny Mercer) – 4:04
3. "Happy Go Lucky Local" – 8:05
4. "Medley: Things Ain't What They Used to Be / Do Nothing till You Hear from Me" (Mercer Ellington, Ted Persons / Ellington, Bob Russell) – 5:14
5. "Guitar Amour" – 5:32
6. "Summertime" (George Gershwin, Ira Gershwin) – 1:57
7. "C Jam Blues" – 4:17
8. "Silk Lace" – 4:44

Disc 2

1. "I Got It Bad (and That Ain't Good)" (Ellington, Paul Francis Webster) – 3:29
2. "Isfahan" (Ellington, Strayhorn) – 3:34
3. "Timon of Athens" – 2:42
4. "Tutti for Cootie" (Ellington, Jimmy Hamilton) – 5:54
5. "Stomping at the Savoy" (Edgar Sampson, Benny Goodman, Chick Webb, Andy Razaf) – 4:07
6. "Jeep's Blues" (Ellington, Johnny Hodges) – 4:40
7. "I Can't Stop Loving You" (Don Gibson) – 5:56
8. "Diminuendo and Crescendo in Blue" – 6:59
9. "Satin Doll" (Ellington, Strayhorn, Johnny Mercer) – 1:44

== Personnel ==
- Duke Ellington – piano
- Cat Anderson, Herbie Jones, Cootie Williams, Nat Woodard – trumpet
- Lawrence Brown, Buster Cooper – trombone
- Chuck Connors – bass trombone
- Jimmy Hamilton – clarinet, tenor saxophone
- Johnny Hodges – alto saxophone
- Russell Procope – alto saxophone, clarinet
- Paul Gonsalves – tenor saxophone
- Harry Carney – baritone saxophone
- Peck Morrison – bass
- Sam Woodyard – drums
