= Concert in the Virgin Islands =

1965 album by Duke Ellington

Studio album by Duke Ellington
- Released: 1965
- Recorded: March 4 & 17 and April 14, 1965
- Genre: Jazz
- Label: Reprise

Duke Ellington chronology
Ellington '66 (1965)	Concert in the Virgin Islands (1965)	Ella at Duke's Place (1965)

Concert in the Virgin Islands is an album by American pianist, composer, and bandleader Duke Ellington, recorded and released on the Reprise label in 1965. The album features studio recordings that Ellington with the Boston Pops Orchestra conducted by Arthur Fiedler composed after he and his orchestra played concerts on St. Croix and St. Thomas in the Virgin Islands in April, 1965. The album includes the four-part Virgin Islands Suite, as well as numbers played at the concerts on the islands.

== Reception ==
The Allmusic review by Scott Yanow awarded the album 4 stars and stated: "Although in his mid-60s, Duke Ellington proves on this program of mostly new music that he never declined nor lost his creativity."

Professional ratings
Review scores
Source	Rating
Allmusic	4/5 stars

== Track listing ==
All compositions by Duke Ellington and Billy Strayhorn except as indicated

1. "Island Virgin" – 4:08
2. "Virgin Jungle" – 3:45
3. "Fiddler on the Diddle" – 3:13
4. "Jungle Kitty" – 3:00
5. "Things Ain't What They Used to Be" (Mercer Ellington) – 2:56
6. "Big Fat Alice's Blues" – 3:58
7. "Chelsea Bridge" (Strayhorn) – 3:46
8. "The Opener" – 2:50
9. "Mysterious Chick" – 3:15
10. "Barefoot Stomper" – 2:52
11. "Fade Up" (Jimmy Hamilton) – 3:31
  - Recorded at Fine Studios, New York on March 4, 1965 (tracks 7, 8 & 11), March 17, 1965 (tracks 4 & 5), and April 14, 1965 (tracks 1–3, 6, 9 & 10).

== Personnel ==
- Duke Ellington – piano
- Ray Nance, Cat Anderson, Herb Jones – trumpet
- Cootie Williams – trumpet (tracks 1–3 & 6–11)
- Howard McGhee – trumpet (tracks 4 & 5)
- Lawrence Brown, Buster Cooper – trombone
- Chuck Connors – bass trombone
- Jimmy Hamilton – clarinet, tenor saxophone
- Johnny Hodges – alto saxophone
- Russell Procope – alto saxophone, clarinet
- Paul Gonsalves – tenor saxophone
- Harry Carney – baritone saxophone
- John Lamb – bass
- Sam Woodyard – drums
