= Historically Speaking (Duke Ellington album) =

Studio album by Duke Ellington
- Released: 1956
- Recorded: February 7 & 8, 1956
- Studio: Universal Recording Corp. (Chicago)
- Genre: Jazz
- Label: Bethlehem

Duke Ellington chronology
Studio Sessions, Chicago 1956 (1956)	Historically Speaking (1956)	Duke Ellington Presents... (1956)

Historically Speaking is an album by American pianist, composer and bandleader Duke Ellington recorded for the Bethlehem label in 1956. The album features updated arrangements of many of Ellington's early compositions.

== Reception ==
Allmusic awarded the album 2 stars.

Professional ratings
Review scores
Source	Rating
Allmusic	2/5 stars

== Track listing ==
All compositions by Duke Ellington except as indicated

1. "East St. Louis Toodle-o" (Ellington, James "Bubber" Miley) – 3:30
2. "Creole Love Call" (Ellington, Miley) – 3:47
3. "Stompy Jones" – 3:53
4. "The Jeep Is Jumpin'" (Ellington, Johnny Hodges, Billy Strayhorn) – 2:25
5. "Jack the Bear" – 3:20
6. "In a Mellow Tone" (Ellington, Milt Gabler) – 2:54
7. "Ko-Ko" – 2:18
8. "Midriff" (Strayhorn) – 3:52
9. "Stomp, Look and Listen" – 2:41
10. "Unbooted Character" – 4:18
11. "Lonesome Lullaby" – 3:19
12. "Upper Manhattan Medical Group" (Strayhorn) – 3:09

- Recorded at Universal Recording Corp., Chicago on February 7 & 8, 1956.

== Personnel ==
- Duke Ellington – piano
- Cat Anderson, Willie Cook, Ray Nance, Clark Terry – trumpet
- Quentin Jackson, Britt Woodman – trombone
- John Sanders – valve trombone
- Jimmy Hamilton – clarinet, tenor saxophone
- Johnny Hodges – alto saxophone
- Russell Procope – alto saxophone, clarinet
- Paul Gonsalves – tenor saxophone
- Harry Carney – baritone saxophone
- Jimmy Woode – bass
- Sam Woodyard – drums
