= Not So Dukish =

Studio album by Johnny Hodges and His Orchestra
- Released: 1958
- Recorded: September 10, 1958; New York City
- Genre: Jazz
- Label: Verve MGV 8355
- Producer: Norman Granz

Johnny Hodges chronology
Blues-a-Plenty (1958)	Not So Dukish (1958)	Johnny Hodges and His Strings Play the Prettiest Gershwin (1958)

Not So Dukish is an album recorded by American jazz saxophonist Johnny Hodges featuring performances recorded in 1958 and released on the Verve label.

== Reception ==
Professional ratings
Review scores
Source	Rating
Allmusic	3/5 stars

The Allmusic site awarded the album 3 stars.

== Track listing ==
All compositions by Johnny Hodges except as indicated

1. "M. H. R." (Johnny Hodges, Billy Strayhorn) - 5:58
2. "Broadway Babe" (Hodges, Mercer Ellington) - 2:43
3. "Three and Six" (Strayhorn) - 2:20
4. "Not So Dukish" (Jimmy Woode) - 7:51
5. "Central Park Swing" (Jimmy Hamilton) - 3:24
6. "Preacher Blues" - 8:22
7. "Jeep Bounced Back" - 3:35
8. "The Last Time I Saw Paris" (Jerome Kern, Oscar Hammerstein II) - 2:53

== Personnel ==
- Johnny Hodges - alto saxophone
- Roy Eldridge, Ray Nance - trumpet
- Lawrence Brown - trombone
- Jimmy Hamilton - clarinet
- Ben Webster - tenor saxophone
- Billy Strayhorn - piano
- Jimmy Woode - bass
- Sam Woodyard - drums
