= Ellington Showcase =

Studio album by Duke Ellington
- Released: 1955
- Recorded: April 9, July 1 & December 29, 1953, January 17, June 17, 1954, May 17 & 18, 1955
- Genre: Jazz
- Label: Capitol

Duke Ellington chronology
Dance to the Duke! (1954)	Ellington Showcase (1955)	Blue Rose (1956)

Ellington Showcase is an album by American pianist, composer and bandleader Duke Ellington recorded for the Capitol label at various sessions in 1953–55. The album has not been released on CD but the tracks have appeared on The Complete Capitol Recordings of Duke Ellington released by Mosaic Records in 1995.

== Reception ==
The Allmusic review awarded the album 3 stars.

Professional ratings
Review scores
Source	Rating
Allmusic	3/5 stars

== Track listing ==
All compositions by Duke Ellington except as indicated

1. "Blossom" (Ellington, Billy Strayhorn) – 2:29
2. "Big Drag" – 2:51
3. "Don't Ever Say Goodbye" – 3:01
4. "Falling Like a Raindrop" – 3:02
5. "Gonna Tan Your Hide" (Ellington, Strayhorn) – 6:13
6. "Harlem Air Shaft" – 3:54
7. "La Virgen De La Macarena" (Bernardo Bautista Monterde) – 4:02
8. "Clarinet Melodrama" (Jimmy Hamilton) – 5:42
9. "Theme For Trambean" (Hamilton) – 3:26
10. "Serious Serenade" – 2:50
- Recorded at Capitol Studios in Los Angeles on April 9, 1953 (track 1), at Universal Studios in Chicago on July 1, 1953 (track 2) December 29, 1953 (track 3), January 17, 1954 (track 4), May 17, 1955 (tracks 6 & 7), and May 18, 1955 (tracks 8–10), and at Capitol Studios in New York on June 17, 1954 (track 5).

== Personnel ==
- Duke Ellington – piano, electric piano (tracks 1, 2 & 5–10)
- Billy Strayhorn – piano (tracks 3 & 4)
- Cat Anderson, Willie Cook, Ray Nance, Clark Terry – trumpet
- Quentin Jackson, George Jean (tracks 2 & 4), Juan Tizol (track 1 & 2), Britt Woodman – trombone
- John Sanders – valve trombone (tracks 5–10)
- Russell Procope – alto saxophone, clarinet
- Rick Henderson – alto saxophone
- Paul Gonsalves – tenor saxophone
- Jimmy Hamilton – clarinet, tenor saxophone
- Harry Carney – baritone saxophone, bass clarinet
- Wendell Marshall (tracks 1–5), Jimmy Woode (tracks 6–10) – bass
- Butch Ballard (tracks 1 & 2) Dave Black (tracks 3–10) – drums
