= Afro-Bossa =

1963 album by Duke Ellington

Studio album by Duke Ellington
- Released: April 1963
- Recorded: November 29, 1962, December 20, 1962, January 4 & 5, 1963
- Genre: Jazz
- Label: Reprise

Duke Ellington chronology
Duke Ellington & John Coltrane (1963)	Afro-Bossa (1963)	The Great Paris Concert (1963)

Afro-Bossa is an album by American pianist, composer and bandleader Duke Ellington, recorded and released on the Reprise label in 1963.

== Reception ==
The AllMusic review by Ken Dryden stated: "This is easily one of Duke Ellington's essential studio recordings of the 1960s, though it isn't as widely recognized as it ought to be".

Professional ratings
Review scores
Source	Rating
AllMusic	4/5 stars
Down Beat	4/5 stars

== Track listing ==
:All compositions by Duke Ellington except as indicated

1. "Afro-Bossa" – 4:22
2. "Purple Gazelle" (also recorded as "Angelica") – 2:44
3. "Absinthe" (Billy Strayhorn, originally copyrighted in 1941 as "Lament for an Orchid") – 3:34
4. "Moonbow" – 2:33
5. "Sempre Amore" – 3:14
6. "Caline (Silk Lace)" – 2:31
7. "Tigress" (Strayhorn, also recorded as "Telstar") – 3:06
8. "Angu" – 2:42
9. "Volupté" – 2:44
10. "Bonga" – 2:49
11. "Pyramid" (Ellington, Irving Gordon, Irving Mills, Juan Tizol) – 3:03
12. "Eighth Veil" (Ellington, Strayhorn) – 2:48

Recorded at Fine Studios, New York, on November 29, 1962 (track 9), December 14, 1962 (track 12), December 20, 1962 (tracks 6 & 11), January 4, 1963 (track 10), and January 5, 1963 (tracks 1–5, 7 & 8).

== Personnel ==
- Duke Ellington – piano (tracks 1, 2, 4–7 & 9–11)
- Billy Strayhorn – piano (tracks 3 & 8)
- Ray Nance – cornet, violin
- Cat Anderson, Roy Burrowes, Cootie Williams – trumpet
- Lawrence Brown, Buster Cooper – trombone
- Chuck Connors – bass trombone
- Jimmy Hamilton – clarinet, tenor saxophone
- Johnny Hodges – alto saxophone
- Russell Procope – alto saxophone, clarinet
- Paul Gonsalves – tenor saxophone
- Harry Carney – baritone saxophone, clarinet, bass clarinet
- Ernie Shepard – bass
- Sam Woodyard – drums
