= The Cosmic Scene =

Studio album by Duke Ellington
- Released: 1958
- Recorded: April 2 & 3, 1958
- Genre: Jazz
- Length: 36:31
- Label: Columbia

Duke Ellington chronology
Duke Ellington at the Bal Masque (1958)	The Cosmic Scene (1958)	Happy Reunion (1956-58)

The Cosmic Scene is a 1958 album by American pianist, composer and bandleader Duke Ellington. Featuring a nonet rather than his usual big band, the album was credited as "Duke Ellington's Spacemen" and was recorded and released on the Columbia label. It was reissued by Mosaic Records in 2007.

== Reception ==
The Allmusic reviewer Michael G. Nastos stated:

Perhaps in many ways a neglected recording in the vast annals of Ellingtonia, fans will certainly welcome this long out of print re-addition to the master's CD discography. It comes highly recommended.

Professional ratings
Review scores
Source	Rating
Allmusic	4/5 stars

== Track listing ==
:All compositions by Duke Ellington except as indicated

- Recorded at Columbia 30th Street Studio, New York on April 2 (tracks 1, 2 & 9–11) and April 3 (tracks 3–8 & 12), 1958

No.	Title	Writer(s)	Length
1.	"Avalon"	Buddy DeSylva; Al Jolson; Vincent Rose	3:22
2.	"Body and Soul"	Edward Heyman; Robert Sour; Frank Eyton; Johnny Green	4:57
3.	"Bass-Ment"	Ellington	3:03
4.	"Early Autumn"	Ralph Burns; Woody Herman	3:10
5.	"Jones"	Ellington; Clark Terry	2:55
6.	"Perdido"	Juan Tizol	2:49
7.	"St. Louis Blues"	W. C. Handy	5:06
8.	"Spacemen"	Ellington	2:32
9.	"Midnight Sun"	Sonny Burke; Lionel Hampton; Johnny Mercer	3:38
10.	"Take the "A" Train"	Billy Strayhorn	4:59
Total length:			36:31

Bonus tracks on CD reissue

No.	Title	Writer(s)	Length
11.	"Body and Soul" (alternative take)	Heyman; Sour; Eyton; Green	4:46
12.	"Jones" (alternative take)	Ellington; Terry	2:35
Total length:			43:52

== Personnel ==
- Duke Ellington – piano
- Clark Terry – trumpet
- Quentin Jackson, Britt Woodman – trombone
- John Sanders – valve trombone
- Jimmy Hamilton – clarinet
- Paul Gonsalves – tenor saxophone
- Jimmy Woode – bass
- Sam Woodyard – drums
