= Duke Ellington Presents... =

Studio album by Duke Ellington
- Released: 1956
- Recorded: February 7 & 8, 1956
- Studio: Universal Recording Corp. (Chicago)
- Genre: Jazz
- Length: 42:15
- Label: Bethlehem

Duke Ellington chronology
Historically Speaking (1956)	Duke Ellington Presents... (1956)	Duke Ellington and the Buck Clayton All-Stars at Newport (1956)

Duke Ellington Presents... is an album by American pianist, composer and bandleader Duke Ellington recorded for the Bethlehem label in 1956.

== Reception ==
The Allmusic review by Scott Yanow awarded the album 2½ stars and stated "Although this set is not essential, the music is quite enjoyable and it is interesting to hear Duke Ellington playing such tunes as "Laura," "My Funny Valentine," and "Indian Summer."

Professional ratings
Review scores
Source	Rating
Allmusic	2.5/5 stars

== Track listing ==
All compositions by Duke Ellington except where noted

1. "Summertime" (George Gershwin, Ira Gershwin, Dubose Heyward) – 2:13
2. "Laura" (Johnny Mercer, David Raksin) – 4:15
3. "I Can't Get Started" (Vernon Duke, Ira Gershwin) – 4:25
4. "My Funny Valentine" (Lorenz Hart, Richard Rodgers) – 4:48
5. "Everything But You" (Ellington, Don George, Harry James) – 2:57
6. "Frustration" – 3:49
7. "Cotton Tail" – 2:52
8. "Day Dream" (Ellington, John Latouche, Billy Strayhorn) – 3:39
9. "Deep Purple" (Peter DeRose, Mitchell Parish) – 3:36
10. "Indian Summer" (Al Dubin, Victor Herbert) – 3:01
11. "Blues" – 7:00

== Personnel ==
- Duke Ellington – piano
- Cat Anderson, Willie Cook, Ray Nance, Clark Terry – trumpet
- Quentin Jackson, Britt Woodman – trombone
- John Sanders – valve trombone
- Jimmy Hamilton – clarinet, tenor saxophone
- Johnny Hodges – alto saxophone
- Russell Procope – alto saxophone, clarinet
- Paul Gonsalves – tenor saxophone
- Harry Carney – baritone saxophone
- Jimmy Woode – bass
- Sam Woodyard – drums
- Ray Nance (track 3), Jimmy Grissom (track 5) – vocal
- Ray Nance (track 3) – violin
