= ...And His Mother Called Him Bill =

Studio album by Duke Ellington
- Released: 1968
- Recorded: August 28–November 15, 1967
- Studio: Coast Recorders, San Francisco; RCA Victor, New York City
- Genre: Jazz
- Length: 46:12 (Original LP) 71:52 (CD Re-issue)
- Label: Bluebird/RCA
- Producer: Steve Backer, Brad McCuen

Duke Ellington chronology
North of the Border in Canada (1967)	...And His Mother Called Him Bill (1968)	Francis A. & Edward K. (1967)

...And His Mother Called Him Bill is a studio album by Duke Ellington recorded in the wake of the death of his long-time collaborator, Billy Strayhorn, in 1967. It won the Grammy Award for Best Large Jazz Ensemble Album in 1968, Ellington's third consecutive victory in this category, following Ellington '66 and the Far East Suite.

== Background ==
Ellington recorded the album as a tribute to Billy Strayhorn, who had died of esophageal cancer in May 1967. Strayhorn was a composer, arranger, and pianist and one of Ellington's closest friends. Ellington's biographer John Edward Hasse notes that Strayhorn's death "was more traumatic to the Ellington orchestra than that of anyone else in the history of the organization."

== Recording and music ==
The album was recorded in August and November 1967. The material consists of Strayhorn's compositions, including some that had not previously been recorded. Ellington chose the songs to demonstrate Strayhorn's versatility and range, as well as to pay homage to the qualities that he most admired in his late writing partner.

"Blood Count" was Strayhorn's last composition, written for the Ellington Orchestra's 1967 concert at Carnegie Hall. Another piece with a medical-related title is "U.M.M.G.", short for "Upper Manhattan Medical Group". The 1951 composition "Rock Skippin' at the Blue Note" showcases Cootie Williams, Jimmy Hamilton, and John Sanders.

== Reception ==
Professional ratings
Review scores
Source	Rating
AllMusic	5/5 stars
The Penguin Guide to Jazz	4/4 stars

...And His Mother Called Him Bill won the Grammy Award for Best Large Jazz Ensemble Album in 1969. In his biography of Ellington, John Edward Hasse says, "Rarely did the entire band play with such heartfelt passion, and the album is widely considered one of Ellington's best." He also refers to "Blood Count" as one of Johnny Hodges' "supreme performances".

The AllMusic review wrote that, "For a man who issued well over 300 albums, this set is among his most profoundly felt and very finest recorded moments." Michael J. West, writing for JazzTimes says, "The most moving moment on the album, and its most celebrated, is the one with which it ends—courtesy of Ellington himself. The leader gives a hushed solo piano rendition to 'Lotus Blossom,' as his band members are heard in the background chattering and packing up their instruments. 'Lotus Blossom' is already surpassingly lovely in its own right; in Ellington's lone hands, its emotional impact becomes nearly unbearable."

== Track listing ==
All compositions by Billy Strayhorn, except where noted.

Side one
No.	Title	Length
1.	"Snibor"	4:13
2.	"Boo-Dah"	3:26
3.	"Blood Count"	4:16
4.	"U.M.M.G."	3:13
5.	"Charpoy"	3:06
6.	"After All"	3:51
Total length:		22:55

Side two
No.	Title	Writer(s)	Length
1.	"The Intimacy of the Blues"		2:57
2.	"Raincheck"		4:35
3.	"Day Dream"	Billy Strayhorn–Duke Ellington	4:23
4.	"Rock Skippin' at the Blue Note"		3:01
5.	"All Day Long"		2:56
6.	"Lotus Blossom" (Piano solo)		3:54
Total length:			21:46 44:41

Bonus tracks
No.	Title	Writer(s)	Length
1.	"Raincheck" (Take 4)		5:22
2.	"Smada" (Take 3)	Strayhorn–Ellington	3:20
3.	"Smada" (Take 4)	Strayhorn–Ellington	3:18
4.	"Midriff"		4:34
5.	"My Little Brown Book"		4:11
6.	"Lotus Blossom" (Trio: Duke Ellington, Harry Carney, Aaron Bell)		4:55
Total length:			25:40

== Personnel ==
- Duke Ellington – piano
- Mercer Ellington – trumpet
- Cat Anderson – trumpet
- Herbie Jones – trumpet
- Cootie Williams – trumpet
- Clark Terry – flugelhorn
- Lawrence Brown – trombone
- Buster Cooper – trombone
- Chuck Connors – bass trombone
- John Sanders – valve trombone
- Johnny Hodges – alto saxophone
- Russell Procope – clarinet and alto saxophone
- Jimmy Hamilton – clarinet and tenor saxophone
- Paul Gonsalves – tenor saxophone
- Harry Carney – baritone saxophone
- Aaron Bell – double bass
- Jeff Castleman – double bass
- Steve Little – drums
- Sam Woodyard – drums
