= The Big Sound (Johnny Hodges album) =

Studio album by Johnny Hodges and the Ellington Men
- Released: 1957
- Recorded: June 26 and September 3, 1957; New York City
- Genre: Jazz
- Label: Verve MGV 8271
- Producer: Norman Granz

Johnny Hodges chronology
| Duke's in Bed (1956) | The Big Sound (1957) | Blues-a-Plenty (1958) |

The Big Sound is an album recorded by American jazz saxophonist Johnny Hodges featuring performances with members of the Duke Ellington Orchestra recorded in 1957 and released on the Verve label.

== Reception ==
Professional ratings
Review scores
| Source | Rating |
|---|---|
| AllMusic | 4/5 stars |
| The Rolling Stone Jazz Record Guide | 4/5 stars |

The AllMusic review by Bob Rusch stated: "While it was not an Ellington record, the band brought its solid qualities in backing and the occasional solo to all the fine Hodges features. This was an integrated unit, not some detached studio band for Hodges to blow over, under, around, and through. It was wonderful Hodges and fine Ellington".

== Track listing ==
All compositions by Johnny Hodges, except as indicated.

1. "Don't Call Me, I'll Call You" (Cat Anderson) - 3:28
2. "An Ordinary Thing" (Anderson) - 3:20
3. "Waiting for Duke" (Anderson) - 3:58
4. "Dust Bowl" - 4:26
5. "Little Rabbit Blues" - 9:26
6. "Viscount" (Hodges, Mercer Ellington) - 2:30
7. "Johnny Come Lately" (Billy Strayhorn) - 2:27
8. "Bouquet of Roses" (Hodges, Mercer Ellington) - 3:23
9. "Gone and Crazy" - 3:14
10. "Digits" (Clark Terry) - 4:18
11. "Segdoh" - 3:28
12. "Early Morning Rock" - 3:34

== Personnel ==
- Johnny Hodges - alto saxophone
- Cat Anderson (tracks 1–4), Shorty Baker (tracks 1–4, 6, 8, 10 & 12), Willie Cook (tracks 1–4), Clark Terry - trumpet
- Ray Nance - trumpet, violin
- Quentin Jackson, John Sanders, Britt Woodman (tracks 1–5, 7, 9 & 11) - trombone
- Jimmy Hamilton - clarinet, tenor saxophone
- Russell Procope - alto saxophone, clarinet
- Paul Gonsalves - tenor saxophone (tracks 1–4)
- Harry Carney - baritone saxophone
- Billy Strayhorn - piano
- Jimmy Woode - bass
- Sam Woodyard - drums
