= Hot and Bothered (A Re-Creation) =

Studio album by Mercer Ellington
- Released: 1985
- Recorded: June 22, 1984
- Studio: Los Angeles
- Genre: Jazz
- Length: 33:35
- Label: Doctor Jazz; FW 40029
- Producer: Mercer Ellington, Bob Thiele

Mercer Ellington chronology
Continuum (1975)	Hot and Bothered (A Re-Creation) (1985)	The Cotton Connection (1985)

Hot and Bothered (A Re-Creation) is an album by American bandleader Mercer Ellington recorded in 1984 and released on the Doctor Jazz label the following year. The album features Duke Ellington compositions that were originally recorded in the 1920s and 30s performed by a mix of east and west coast musicians.

== Reception ==
Professional ratings
Review scores
Source	Rating
Allmusic	2.5/5 stars

Allmusic awarded the album 4 stars and the review by Scott Yanow stated "Probably the best example of the Mercer Ellington Orchestra of the 1980s, this LP has new and revised versions of nine vintage Duke Ellington compositions/arrangements, all dating before 1935. ... this is a spirited set. There were few of Duke's alumni in Mercer's band but the many soloists bring back the spirit of Duke's music".

== Track listing ==
All compositions by Duke Ellington except where noted

1. "Hot and Bothered" – 3:05
2. "The Mooche" (Ellington, Irving Mills) – 5:33
3. "Creole Love Call" – 3:01
4. "Daybreak Express" – 3:55
5. "East St. Louis Toodle-Oo" (Ellington, Bubber Miley) – 3:10
6. "Caravan" (Ellington, Juan Tizol, Mills) – 2:34
7. "Echoes of Harlem" – 3:25
8. "Ring Dem Bells" (Ellington, Mills) – 2:43
9. "Harlem Speaks" – 2:45

== Personnel ==
- Mercer Ellington – arranger, conductor, band leader
- Rick Baptist, Barrie Lee Hall, Will Miller, Ron Tooley - trumpet
- Art Baron, Chuck Connors, Herman Green, Ed Neumeister - trombone
- Gary Bias, Bill Green, George Minerve, Charlie Owens, Herman Riley – reeds
- Lloyd Mayers – piano
- Kenny Burrell – guitar, banjo
- J. J. Wiggins – bass
- Rocky White – drums
- Rudy Bird – percussion
- Jack Kelso - clarinet (tracks 1, 7 & 9)
- Dick Hurwitz - trumpet (track 7)
- Anita Moore – vocals (track 1)
