= Silhouettes (Lonnie Liston Smith album) =

Studio album by Lonnie Liston Smith
- Released: 1984
- Recorded: June 7, 8 & 12 and July 10, 11, 12 & 18, 1984
- Studio: New York City
- Genre: Jazz, soul jazz
- Length: 38:51
- Label: Doctor Jazz; FW 39420
- Producer: Robert Thiele Jr., Harvey Goldberg

Lonnie Liston Smith chronology
Dreams of Tomorrow (1983)	Silhouettes (1984)	Rejuvenation (1985)

Silhouettes is an album by keyboardist Lonnie Liston Smith, featuring performances recorded and released by the Flying Dutchman label in 1984.

== Reception ==
Professional ratings
Review scores
Source	Rating
AllMusic	2.5/5 stars

In his review for AllMusic, Richard S. Ginell stated that the album, "continues the Lonnie Liston Smith string of sweetly ingratiating pop/jazz background albums. If anything, Smith's keyboard work is even more stripped down and lightly melodic than before, and his new cohorts create more mild-mannered, semi-funky backdrops that won't disturb anyone's sleep".

== Track listing ==
All compositions by Lonnie Liston Smith except where noted

1. "Warm" (Bob Thiele, Glenn Osser) − 3:09
2. "If You Take Care of Me" (Robert Thiele Jr., Davitt Sigerson) − 5:10
3. "Silhouettes" − 4:38
4. "Summer Afternoon" − 5:49
5. "Enlightenment" (Robert Thiele Jr., Sigerson, Smith) − 4:51
6. "City of Lights" (Eric Paul Saunders) − 5:11
7. "Once Again Love" (Tom Barney) − 5:02
8. "Just Us Two" − 4:17

== Personnel ==
- Lonnie Liston Smith − electric piano, acoustic piano
- Premik Russell Tubbs − soprano saxophone, alto flute (tracks 1, 3, 4, 6 & 7)
- Joy Askew (tracks 4, 5 & 7), Barry Eastmond (track 2), Robert Thiele Jr. (tracks 2 & 5) − synthesizer
- Abdul Wuali − guitar (tracks 4−6)
- Tom Barney (tracks 2−5 & 7), Anthony Jackson (track 6) − bass
- Buddy Williams − drums (tracks 2−7)
- Jimmy Maelen (tracks 1 & 4−6), Kimati Dinizulu (track 1), Robert Thiele Jr. (track 5), Keven P. Green (track 5), Miles Watson (track 5), Steve Thornton (tracks 2 & 3) − percussion
- Donald Smith − lead vocals (track 2)
- Babi Floyd, Kurt Yahjian − backing vocals (track 2)
