= Duke's in Bed =

Studio album by Johnny Hodges and the Ellington All-Stars
- Released: 1957
- Recorded: September 1, 1956; New York City
- Genre: Jazz
- Length: 42:30
- Label: Verve MGV 8203
- Producer: Norman Granz

Johnny Hodges chronology
Ellingtonia '56 (1956)	Duke's in Bed (1957)	The Big Sound (1957)

Duke's in Bed is an album recorded by American jazz saxophonist Johnny Hodges with members of the Duke Ellington Orchestra featuring performances recorded in 1956 and released on the Verve label. All arrangements were done by Billy Strayhorn.

== Reception ==
Professional ratings
Review scores
Source	Rating
Allmusic	3/5 stars

The Allmusic site awarded the album 3 stars.

== Track listing ==
All compositions by Johnny Hodges except as indicated

1. "A-Oodie-Oobie" – 3:31
2. "Meet Mr. Rabbit" – 7:16
3. "Duke's in Bed" (Duke Ellington) – 2:53
4. "Just Squeeze Me" (Ellington, Lee Gaines) – 3:07
5. "Ballad for the Very Tired and Very Sad Lotus Eaters" (Billy Strayhorn) – 3:21
6. "Confab with Rab" – 3:17
7. "It Had to Be You" (Isham Jones, Gus Kahn) – 3:06
8. "Black and Tan Fantasy" (Ellington, Bubber Miley) – 6:21
9. "Take the "A" Train" (Strayhorn) – 8:02

== Personnel ==
- Johnny Hodges – alto saxophone
- Clark Terry – trumpet
- Ray Nance – trumpet, violin, vocals
- Quentin Jackson – trombone
- Jimmy Hamilton – clarinet, tenor saxophone
- Harry Carney – baritone saxophone
- Billy Strayhorn – piano
- Jimmy Woode – bass
- Sam Woodyard – drums
