= Ellingtonia '56 =

Studio album by Johnny Hodges and His Small Band
- Released: 1956
- Recorded: January 11 & 12, 1956; New York City
- Genre: Jazz
- Label: Norgran MGN 1055
- Producer: Norman Granz

Johnny Hodges chronology
Creamy (1955)	Ellingtonia '56 (1956)	Duke's in Bed (1956)

Ellingtonia '56 is an album recorded by American jazz saxophonist Johnny Hodges featuring performances with members of the Duke Ellington Orchestra recorded in 1956 and released on the Norgran label.

== Reception ==
Professional ratings
Review scores
Source	Rating
AllMusic	3/5 stars

The Allmusic site awarded the album 3 stars.

== Track listing ==
All compositions by Johnny Hodges, except as indicated.

1. "Hi 'Ya" (Johnny Hodges, Billy Strayhorn) - 3:10
2. "Snibor" (Strayhorn) - 7:16
3. "Texas Blues" - 11:47
4. "I'm Gonna Sit Right Down and Write Myself a Letter" (Fred E. Ahlert, Joe Young) - 3:29
5. "Duke's Jam" (Edith Cue Hodges) - 6:25
6. "Night Walk" (Cat Anderson) - 3:13
7. "The Happy One" (Anderson) - 2:52
8. "You Got It Coming" - 6:04

== Personnel ==
- Johnny Hodges - alto saxophone
- Cat Anderson (tracks 5–8), Willie Cook (tracks 5–8), Ray Nance, Clark Terry (tracks 5–8) - trumpet
- Lawrence Brown (tracks 1–4), Quentin Jackson (tracks 5–8), John Sanders (tracks 5–8), Britt Woodman (tracks 5–8) - trombone
- Jimmy Hamilton - clarinet, tenor saxophone
- Russell Procope - alto saxophone (tracks 5–8)
- Paul Gonsalves - tenor saxophone (tracks 5–8)
- Harry Carney - baritone saxophone
- Billy Strayhorn - piano
- Jimmy Woode - bass
- Sam Woodyard - drums
