= Ellington at Newport =

1956 live album by Duke Ellington and his band

Live album by Duke Ellington
- Released: November 1956
- Recorded: July 7–8, 1956
- Genres: Jazz; Big Band
- Length: 43:53 (original release); 129:57 (1999 expanded and remastered edition)
- Label: Columbia
- Producers: 1956 LP: George Avakian; 1999 CD: Phil Schaap

Duke Ellington chronology
Duke Ellington and the Buck Clayton All-Stars at Newport (1956)	Ellington at Newport (1956)	A Drum Is a Woman (1957)

Professional ratings
Review scores
Source	Rating
AllMusic	5/5 stars
Billboard	(positive)
Tom Hull	A+
The Penguin Guide to Jazz Recordings	4/4 stars
The Rolling Stone Jazz Record Guide	5/5 stars

Ellington at Newport is a 1956 live jazz album by Duke Ellington and his band of their 1956 concert at the Newport Jazz Festival, a concert which revitalized Ellington's flagging career. Jazz promoter George Wein describes the 1956 concert as "the greatest performance of [Ellington's] career... It stood for everything that jazz had been and could be." It is included in the book 1001 Albums You Must Hear Before You Die, which ranks it "one of the most famous... in jazz history". The original release was partly recreated in the studio after the Ellington Orchestra's festival appearance.

Ellington released a follow-up album also recorded at the Newport Jazz Festival, Newport 1958, two years later.

In 2022, the album was selected by the Library of Congress for preservation in the United States National Recording Registry as being "culturally, historically, or aesthetically significant".

== Context ==
Many big bands folded by the mid-1950s, but Ellington kept his band working, occasionally doing shows in ice-skating rinks to stay busy. The Duke Ellington Orchestra did European tours during the early 1950s, and Ellington was chiefly supporting the band himself through royalties earned on his popular compositions of the 1920s to the 1940s. At the time of the festival, the band did not even have a record deal. Afterwards, Ellington once again had a contract with Columbia Records.

== Performance ==
=== Beginning ===
Duke and his orchestra arrived to play at the Newport Jazz Festival at a time when jazz festivals were a fairly new innovation. Ellington's band was the first and last group to play at the Newport Festival. The first, short set began at 8:30 and included "The Star-Spangled Banner", "Black and Tan Fantasy" and "Tea for Two". This set was played without a few of the band's members as they were unable to be found at the start of the show. Bassist Al Lucas replaced Jimmy Woode for the first set.

After performances by the other groups, the remainder of the band was located and the real performance began. Duke asked trumpeter Herbie Jones to join the band on stage, as a ''flop'' insurance in case something went wrong. Duke led off with "Take the 'A' Train", followed by a new composition by Duke and Billy Strayhorn, a suite of three pieces: "Festival Junction", "Blues to Be There", and "Newport Up". This suite was intended to be the showstopper, but the reception was not as enthusiastic as was hoped.

Following the Festival suite, Duke called for Harry Carney's baritone saxophone performance of "Sophisticated Lady". Then the orchestra played "Day In, Day Out". Following this, Duke announced that they were pulling out "some of [their] 1938 vintage": "Diminuendo and Crescendo in Blue" joined by an improvised interval, which Duke announced would be played by tenor saxophonist Paul Gonsalves.

=== The Gonsalves solo ===
Ellington had been experimenting with the reworking for several years before the Newport performance; a release of one of his Carnegie Hall concerts of the 1940s presented the two old blues joined by a wordless vocal passage, "Transbluecency," but in time he chose to join the pair by a saxophone solo, handing it to Gonsalves, experimenting with it in shorter performances before the Newport show, where Ellington is believed to have told Gonsalves to blow as long as he felt like blowing when the solo slot came. It came after two choruses of an Ellington piano break at what was formerly the conclusion of "Diminuendo in Blue."

As performed at Newport, the experiment ended up revamping the Ellington reputation and fortune for the rest of Ellington's life. The previous experiments culminated in a 27-chorus solo by Gonsalves — simple, but powerful — backed only by bassist Jimmy Woode, drummer Sam Woodyard, and Ellington himself pounding punctuating piano chords and (with several audible band members as well) hollering urgings-on ("Come on, Paul — dig in! Dig in!") to his soloist. The normally sedate crowd was on their feet dancing in the aisles, reputedly provoked by a striking platinum blonde woman in a black evening dress, Elaine Anderson, getting up and dancing enthusiastically. When the solo ended and Gonsalves collapsed in exhaustion, Ellington himself took over for two choruses of piano solo before the full band returned for the "Crescendo in Blue" portion, finishing with a rousing finale featuring high-note trumpeter Cat Anderson.

=== Ending ===
After that performance, pandemonium took over. Duke calmed the crowd by announcing: "If you've heard of the saxophone, then you've heard of Johnny Hodges." Duke's best known alto saxophonist then played two of his most famous numbers in "I Got It Bad (and That Ain't Good)" followed by "Jeep's Blues". Still the crowd refused to disperse so Duke called for Ray Nance to sing "Tulip or Turnip". The festival's organizers tried to cut off the show at this point but once again were met with angry refusals to end the evening.

Duke told the announcer that he would end the show and wanted to thank the audience but instead announced he had a "very heavy request for Sam Woodyard in 'Skin Deep'", a number written by former Ellington drummer Louie Bellson. This drum solo feature was the final number featured, followed by a farewell from Duke over "Mood Indigo". In his farewell, he thanked the crowd for the "wonderful way in which you've inspired us this evening." He then finished with his trademark statement: "You are very beautiful, very sweet and we do love you madly." With that, the historic show concluded.

== Recordings ==
Columbia Records recorded the concert and an album soon followed. Duke appeared soon after on the cover of Time, and his resurgent popularity lasted throughout the rest of his life. Some of his most critically acclaimed albums occurred during the next decade and a half, until age and illness began to claim some of Duke's band members and, in 1974, Ellington himself.

In 1996, a tape discovered in the Voice of America's archive of its radio broadcasts revealed that the 1956 album had indeed been fabricated with studio performances mixed with some live recordings and artificial applause. Only about 40 percent of the 1956 recording was actually live. The reason for this was that Ellington felt the under-rehearsed Festival suite had not been performed up to recording release standards, and he wished to have a better version on tape if it was to be issued on record. Producer George Avakian did as Ellington asked and the band entered the studio immediately after the festival. Avakian mixed in the studio version with portions of the live performance. The applause was dubbed onto the original release to cover up the fact that Gonsalves had been playing into the wrong microphone and was often completely inaudible.

On the 1999 reissue, the Voice of America live recording and live Columbia tapes were painstakingly pieced together using digital technology to create a stereophonic recording of the best-known Ellington performance of the past 50 years, this time with Gonsalves' solo clearly heard, though the beginning of the audience cheering and noise at around the seventh or eighth chorus of the solo can still be heard as well. (Stereophonic LP records were not mass-produced until 1957, the year after the recording.)

== Track listing ==
=== Original 1956 LP: Ellington at Newport ===
Side A

1. "Festival Junction" - 10:08
2. "Blues to Be There" - 8:04
3. "Newport Up" - 5:33

Side B

1. "Jeep's Blues" - 5:12
2. "Diminuendo and Crescendo in Blue" - 14:56

=== Remastered 1999 CD: Ellington at Newport (Complete) ===
Disc one

1. "The Star-Spangled Banner" - 1:10
2. Father Norman O'Connor Introduces Duke & the Orchestra / Duke Introduces Tune & Anderson, Jackson & Procope - 3:36
3. "Black and Tan Fantasy" - 6:21
4. Duke Introduces Cook & Tune - 0:26
5. "Tea for Two" - 3:34
6. Duke & Band Leave Stage / Father Norman Talks About The Festival - 2:30
7. "Take the 'A' Train" - 4:27
8. Duke Announces Strayhorn's A Train & Nance / Duke Introduces Festival Suite, Part I & Hamilton - 0:41
9. "Part I - Festival Junction" - 8:10
10. Duke Announces Soloists; Introduces Part II - 0:38
11. "Part II - Blues to Be There" - 7:09
12. Duke Announces Nance & Procope; Introduces Part III - 0:19
13. "Part III - Newport Up" - 5:33
14. Duke Announces Hamilton, Gonsalves & Terry / Duke Introduces Carney & Tune - 0:25
15. "Sophisticated Lady" - 3:52
16. Duke Announces Grissom & Tune - 0:17
17. "Day In, Day Out" - 3:50
18. Duke Introduces Tune(s) and Paul Gonsalves Interludes - 0:23
19. "Diminuendo and Crescendo In Blue" - 14:20
20. Announcements, Pandemonium - 0:44
21. Pause Track - 0:06

Disc two

1. Duke Introduces Johnny Hodges - 0:18
2. "I Got It Bad (and That Ain't Good)" - 3:38
3. "Jeep's Blues" - 4:36
4. Duke Calms Crowd; Introduces Nance & Tune - 0:42
5. "Tulip or Turnip" - 2:49
6. Riot Prevention - 1:08
7. "Skin Deep" - 9:13
8. "Mood Indigo" - 1:30
9. Studio Concert (Excerpts) - 4:01
10. Father Norman O'Connor Introduces Duke Ellington / Duke Introduces New Work, Part I & Hamilton - 1:02
11. "Part I - Festival Junction" - 8:46
12. Duke Announces Soloists; Introduces Part II - 0:32
13. "Part II - Blues To Be There" - 7:48
14. Duke Announces Nance & Procope; Introduces Part III" - 0:16
15. "Part III - Newport Up" - 5:20
16. Duke Announces Hamilton, Gonsalves & Terry / Pause / Duke Introduces Johnny Hodges - 0:41
17. "I Got It Bad (And That Ain't Good)" - 3:47
18. "Jeep's Blues" - 4:31
19. Pause Track - 0:06
- Tracks 9–19 on CD2 were not part of the original performance.

== Personnel ==
- Duke Ellington – piano
- Cat Anderson – trumpet
- Willie Cook – trumpet
- Ray Nance – trumpet, vocals
- Clark Terry – trumpet
- Herbie Jones – trumpet
- Quentin Jackson – trombone
- John Sanders – trombone
- Britt Woodman – trombone
- Johnny Hodges – alto saxophone
- Russell Procope – alto saxophone, clarinet
- Paul Gonsalves – tenor saxophone
- Harry Carney – baritone saxophone
- Jimmy Hamilton – clarinet
- Jimmy Woode – double bass
- Al Lucas – bass
- Jimmy Grissom – vocals
- Sam Woodyard – drums
