= Once Upon a Time (Earl Hines album) =

Studio album by Earl Hines
- Released: 1966
- Recorded: January 10–11, 1966
- Genre: Jazz
- Length: 37:24
- Label: Impulse! A-9108
- Producer: Bob Thiele

Earl Hines chronology
Blues So Low (1966)	Once Upon a Time (1966)	Spontaneous Explorations (1966)

Professional ratings
Review scores
Source	Rating
AllMusic	2.5/5 stars
The Penguin Guide to Jazz Recordings	3/4 stars

Once Upon a Time is a studio album by American jazz pianist Earl Hines, recorded over January 10–11, 1966 and released on Impulse! later that year. Hines is accompanied by members of the Duke Ellington orchestra.

== Track listing ==
Side 1
No.	Title	Writer(s)	Length
1.	"Once upon a Time"	Johnny Hodges	7:57
2.	"Black and Tan Fantasy"	Duke Ellington, James "Bubber" Miley	5:13
3.	"Fantastic, That's You"	George Cates, Bob Thiele	4:13
4.	"Cotton Tail"	Ellington	3:16

Side 2
No.	Title	Writer(s)	Length
1.	"The Blues in My Flat"	Lionel Hampton	8:02
2.	"You Can Depend on Me"	Charles Carpenter, Louis Dunlap, Earl Hines	5:01
3.	"Hash Brown"	Hodges	3:42

== Personnel ==
=== Musicians ===
- Earl Hines – piano
- Jimmy Hamilton – clarinet, tenor saxophone (tracks: A1, A3, A4)
- Pee Wee Russell – clarinet (tracks: A2, B1 to B3)
- Johnny Hodges, Russell Procope – alto saxophone (tracks: A1, A2, A4, B3)
- Harold Ashby (tracks: A1, A2, A4, B3), Paul Gonsalves (except "Fantastic, That's You") – tenor saxophone
- Lawrence Brown, Buster Cooper (tracks: A2, B1 to B3) – trombone (tracks: A1, A2, A4 to B3)
- Cat Anderson, Ray Nance (except B3) – trumpet (tracks: A1, A2, A4 to B3)
- Aaron Bell – bass (tracks: A2, A3, B1 to B3)
- Elvin Jones (tracks: A1, A3, B1, B2), Sonny Greer (tracks: A2, A4, B3) – drums

=== Technical personnel ===
- Bob Thiele – producer
- Bob Simpson – recording engineer
- Joe Lebow – design
- Charles Stewart – photography
- Stanley Dance – liner notes
