= Tales of a Courtesan (Oirantan) =

Studio album by Toshiko Akiyoshi – Lew Tabackin Big Band
- Released: 1976
- Recorded: Sunset - Highland Recording Studio, Los Angeles, California, December 1–3, 1975
- Genre: Jazz
- Length: 45:03
- Label: Victor (Japan), RCA Victor (U.S.)
- Producer: Hiroshi Isaka

Toshiko Akiyoshi – Lew Tabackin Big Band chronology
Long Yellow Road (1975)	Tales of a Courtesan (Oirantan) (1976)	Road Time (1976)

Alternative cover
- RCA Victor (U.S.) LP cover

Professional ratings
Review scores
Source	Rating
Allmusic link	favorable

Tales of a Courtesan (Oirantan) is the third recording of the Toshiko Akiyoshi – Lew Tabackin Big Band. It is also sometimes referred to by the title HANA KAI TAN (花魁譚) in rōmaji listings of the Japanese album title.

All tracks from this album are also included on the 2008 Mosaic 3 CD compilation, Mosaic Select: Toshiko Akiyoshi - Lew Tabackin Big Band.

== Track listing ==
All songs composed and arranged by Toshiko Akiyoshi:

LP side A

1. "Road Time Shuffle" – 6:28
2. "Tales of a Courtesan (Oirantan)" – 9:12
3. "Strive for Jive" – 7:50

LP side B

1. "I Ain't Gonna Ask No More" – 6:10
2. "Interlude" – 4:16
3. "Village" – 11:07

== Personnel ==
- Toshiko Akiyoshi – piano
- Lew Tabackin – tenor saxophone, flute, piccolo
- Tom Peterson – tenor saxophone, alto flute, clarinet
- Dick Spencer – alto saxophone, flute, clarinet
- Gary Foster – alto saxophone, soprano saxophone, flute, clarinet, alto clarinet
- Bill Perkins – baritone saxophone, alto flute, bass clarinet
- Bobby Shew – trumpet
- Steven Huffsteter – trumpet
- Mike Price – trumpet
- Richard Cooper – trumpet
- Jim Sawyer – trombone (on "Strive for Jive" and "Village")
- Bill Reichenbach Jr. – trombone (except on "Strive for Jive" and "Village")
- Charlie Loper – trombone
- Britt Woodman – trombone
- Phil Teele – bass trombone
- Don Baldwin – bass
- Peter Donald – drums

Guest Artist

- King Errisson – congas (on "Village")

== References / external links ==
- RCA Victor Records RVC RVP-6004
- U.S. album cover illustrator: Stanislaw Fernandes ©1976
- Tales of a Courtesan... at Allmusic.com
