= Rejuvenation (Lonnie Liston Smith album) =

Studio album by Lonnie Liston Smith
- Released: 1985
- Recorded: February 26 & 27, 1985
- Studio: New York City
- Genre: Jazz, soul jazz
- Length: 36:00
- Label: Doctor Jazz; FW 40063
- Producer: Bob Thiele

Lonnie Liston Smith chronology
| Silhouettes (1984) | Rejuvenation (1985) | Make Someone Happy (1986) |

Rejuvenation is an album by keyboardist Lonnie Liston Smith, featuring performances recorded and released by the Flying Dutchman label in 1985.

== Reception ==
Professional ratings
Review scores
| Source | Rating |
|---|---|
| AllMusic | 3/5 stars |

In his review for AllMusic, Scott Yanow stated "None of the leader's six originals are all that memorable, and the moody performances are actually most successful as superior background music".

== Track listing ==
All compositions by Lonnie Liston Smith except where noted

1. "Rejuvenation" (Lonnie Liston Smith, Premik Russell Tubbs) − 8:34
2. "Island in the Sun" − 6:05
3. "London Interlude" − 5:36
4. "The Eternal Quest (In Search of Truth)" (Lonnie Liston Smith, Sri Chinmoy) − 5:19
5. "A Frozen Lake" − 4:56
6. "Girl in My Dreams" − 5:40

== Personnel ==
- Lonnie Liston Smith − Fender Rhodes electric piano, acoustic piano
- Premik Russell Tubbs − soprano saxophone (tracks 1, 2, 4 & 6)
- Daniel Carillo − guitar
- Robert Zantay − lyricon (tracks 1, 3 & 6)
- Cecil McBee − bass (tracks 1−4 & 6)
- Steve Thornton − percussion (tracks 1−4 & 6)
