= Make Someone Happy (Lonnie Liston Smith album) =

Studio album by Lonnie Liston Smith
- Released: 1986
- Recorded: October 27, 1986
- Studio: New York City
- Genre: Jazz, soul jazz
- Length: 34:32
- Label: Doctor Jazz; FW 40612
- Producer: Bob Thiele

Lonnie Liston Smith chronology
Rejuvenation (1985)	Make Someone Happy (1986)	Love Goddess (1990)

Make Someone Happy is an album by keyboardist Lonnie Liston Smith, featuring performances recorded and released by the Flying Dutchman label in 1986.

== Reception ==
Professional ratings
Review scores
Source	Rating
AllMusic	2.5/5 stars

In his review for AllMusic, Scott Yanow stated: "For this refreshing change of pace, Lonnie Liston Smith (best known for his atmospheric mood music) sticks exclusively to acoustic piano and plays mostly standards in a trio ... One of Smith's very few straight-ahead dates, this LP is worth searching for as a strong example of Lonnie Liston Smith's acoustic playing".

== Track listing ==
1. "Satin Doll" (Duke Ellington, Billy Strayhorn, Johnny Mercer) − 3:59
2. "Make Someone Happy" (Jule Styne, Betty Comden, Adolph Green) − 5:40
3. "Close Your Eyes" (Bernice Petkere) − 3:34
4. "I Can't Get Started" (Vernon Duke, Ira Gershwin) − 4:39
5. "Speak Low" (Kurt Weill, Ogden Nash) − 4:17
6. "Wives and Lovers" (Burt Bacharach, Hal David) − 3:53
7. "Cary Paul and Louisa" (Cecil McBee) − 4:09
8. "Duke's Place" (Ellington, Bill Katts, Bob Thiele, Ruth Roberts) − 4:21

== Personnel ==
- Lonnie Liston Smith − piano
- Cecil McBee − bass
- Al Foster − drums
