= Free Again (Gene Ammons album) =

Studio album by Gene Ammons
- Released: 1972
- Recorded: March 20, 1972; Los Angeles, California
- Genre: Jazz
- Label: Prestige; PR 10040
- Producer: Ozzie Cadena and Ray Shanklin

Gene Ammons chronology
Chicago Concert (1971)	Free Again (1972)	Got My Own (1972)

Professional ratings
Review scores
Source	Rating
Allmusic	3/5 stars
The Rolling Stone Jazz Record Guide	3/5 stars

Free Again is an album by saxophonist Gene Ammons recorded in 1972 and released on the Prestige label.

== Reception ==
Allmusic awarded the album 3 stars.

== Track listing ==
1. "Crazy Mary" - 4:50
2. "Free Again" (Armand Canfora, Joss Baselli, Robert Colby) - 6:20
3. "Fru Fru" (Gene Ammons, Bobby Bryant) - 4:35
4. "What Are You Doing the Rest of Your Life?" (Alan Bergman, Marilyn Bergman, Michel Legrand) - 4:37
5. "Jaggin'" (Bobby Bryant) - 5:05
6. "Jackson" (Gene Ammons, Bobby Bryant) - 5:25

== Personnel ==
- Gene Ammons - tenor saxophone
- Cat Anderson, Al Aarons, John Audino, Buddy Childers, Gene Coe, Reunald Jones - trumpet
- Jimmy Cleveland, Grover Mitchell, Benny Powell, Mike Wemberley, Britt Woodman - trombone
- David Duke, Henry Sigismonti - French horn
- Tommy Johnson - tuba
- Pete Christlieb, Red Holloway - tenor saxophone
- Jack Nimitz, Jerome Richardson, Herman Riley, Ernie Watts - reeds
- Dwight Dickerson, Joe Sample - piano
- Arthur Adams, Dennis Budimir - guitar
- Bob Saravia - bass
- Chuck Rainey - electric bass
- Otis "Candy" Finch, Paul Humphrey - drums
- Bob Noris - congas
- Bobby Bryant - arranger, conductor
