= It's About Time (Jimmy Hamilton album) =

Studio album by Jimmy Hamilton with Clark Terry and Britt Woodman
- Released: 1961
- Recorded: March 21, 1961
- Studios: Van Gelder Studio, Englewood Cliffs, New Jersey
- Genre: Jazz
- Length: 37:35
- Labels: Swingville; SV 2022
- Producer: Esmond Edwards

Jimmy Hamilton chronology
Swing Low Sweet Clarinet (1960)	It's About Time (1961)	Can't Help Swinging (1961)

It's About Time is an album by saxophonist Jimmy Hamilton which was recorded in 1961 and released on the Swingville label.

== Reception ==
Professional ratings
Review scores
Source	Rating
Allmusic	4/5 stars

Scott Yanow of Allmusic states: "Hamilton is matched in a sextet with flugelhornist Clark Terry, trombonist Britt Woodman, pianist Tommy Flanagan, bassist Wendell Marshall and drummer Mel Lewis for a set of mostly blues. Terry and Woodman are quite exuberant throughout". All About Jazz called it "a very strong album, and it has a home-run swing".

== Track listing ==
All compositions by Jimmy Hamilton

1. "Two for One" – 5:48
2. "Mr. Good Blues" – 6:40
3. "Peanut Head" – 5:12
4. "Stupid But Not Crazy" – 5:17
5. "Nits and Wits" – 9:44
6. "Gone With the Blues" – 4:54

== Personnel ==
- Jimmy Hamilton – clarinet, tenor saxophone
- Clark Terry – trumpet, flugelhorn
- Britt Woodman – trombone
- Tommy Flanagan – piano
- Wendell Marshall – bass
- Mel Lewis – drums
