= Dreams of Tomorrow =

Studio album by Lonnie Liston Smith
- Released: 1983
- Recorded: 1983
- Genre: Jazz, soul jazz
- Length: 32:20
- Label: Doctor Jazz; FW 38447
- Producer: Lonnie Liston Smith, Marcus Miller

Lonnie Liston Smith chronology
Love Is the Answer (1980)	Dreams of Tomorrow (1983)	Silhouettes (1984)

Dreams of Tomorrow is an album by keyboardist Lonnie Liston Smith, featuring performances recorded and released by the Flying Dutchman label in 1983.

== Reception ==
Professional ratings
Review scores
Source	Rating
AllMusic	2.5/5 stars

In his review for AllMusic, Richard S. Ginell stated "little had changed in his music, which remains pleasant, gently funky and deeply into spiritual concerns but not in a heavy way".

== Track listing ==
All compositions by Lonnie Liston Smith except where noted

1. "A Lonely Way to Be" (Marcus Miller) − 4:33
2. "Mystic Woman" − 4:38
3. "The Love I See in Your Eyes" (Miller) − 3:39
4. "Dreams of Tomorrow" − 4:17
5. "Never Too Late" (Miller) − 5:19
6. "Rainbows of Love" − 4:12
7. "Divine Light" (Lonnie Liston Smith, Sri Chinmoy) − 3:33
8. "A Garden of Peace" − 3:09

== Personnel ==
- Lonnie Liston Smith − electric piano, acoustic piano
- Marcus Miller − bass, Prophet 5 synthesizer, guitar (tracks 1–5 & 7)
- Donald Smith − flute, lead vocals (tracks 1–7)
- David Hubbard − soprano saxophone (tracks 1, 3 & 5–7)
- Yogi Horton (tracks 1, 2 & 5), Buddy Williams (tracks 3, 4, 6 & 7) − drums
- Steve Thornton − percussion (tracks 1–7)
