= Blues A-Plenty =

Studio album by Johnny Hodges and His Orchestra
- Released: 1958
- Recorded: April 5, 1958; New York City
- Genre: Jazz
- Length: 42:30
- Label: Verve MGV 8358
- Producer: Norman Granz

Johnny Hodges chronology
The Big Sound (1957)	Blues A-Plenty (1958)	Not So Dukish (1958)

Blues A-Plenty is an album recorded by American jazz saxophonist Johnny Hodges featuring performances recorded in 1958 and released on the Verve label.

== Reception ==
Professional ratings
Review scores
Source	Rating
Allmusic	3/5 stars

The Allmusic site awarded the album 3 stars.

== Track listing ==
All compositions by Johnny Hodges except as indicated

1. "I Didn't Know About You" (Duke Ellington, Bob Russell) - 3:35
2. "Cool Your Motor" - 3:39
3. "Gone With the Wind" (Allie Wrubel, Herb Magidson) - 3:21
4. "Honey Hill" - 4:05
5. "Blues-a-Plenty" - 3:26
6. "Don't Take Your Love from Me" (Henry Nemo) - 3:43
7. "Saturday Afternoon Blues" - 6:02
8. "Satin Doll" (Ellington) - 5:04
9. "Reeling and Rocking" - 9:35

== Personnel ==
- Johnny Hodges - alto saxophone
- Roy Eldridge - trumpet
- Vic Dickenson - trombone
- Ben Webster - tenor saxophone
- Billy Strayhorn - piano
- Jimmy Woode - bass
- Sam Woodyard - drums
