= All Star Road Band =

Live album by Duke Ellington
- Released: 1983
- Recorded: June 1, 1957
- Venues: Sunset Ballroom, Carrolltown, Pennsylvania
- Genre: Jazz
- Length: 71:00
- Labels: Doctor Jazz; W2X 39137
- Producer: Bob Thiele

Duke Ellington chronology
Such Sweet Thunder (1957)	All Star Road Band (1983)	Ella Fitzgerald Sings the Duke Ellington Song Book (1957)

All Star Road Band is a live album by American pianist, composer and bandleader Duke Ellington recorded at Sunset Ballroom in Carrolltown, Pennsylvania, for radio broadcast and first released as a double LP on Bob Thiele's Doctor Jazz label in 1983. The album was rereleased on CD under the title All Star Road Band Volume One.

== Reception ==
Professional ratings
Review scores
Source	Rating
AllMusic	4/5 stars

Commenting on the original release in The New York Times, jazz critic John S. Wilson wrote: "It is a collection that brings Duke Ellington and his orchestra vividly alive for anyone who ever saw them and it may offer an explanation of his personal and musical charisma for those who missed him." The AllMusic review by Heather Phares stated: "Fresh arrangements of 'Take the 'A' Train', 'Mood Indigo', 'I Got It Bad (And That Ain't Good)' and 'Sophisticated Lady' make this set as invigorating now as it was."

== Track listing ==
All compositions by Duke Ellington except where noted

Disc 1

1. "Take the 'A' Train" (Billy Strayhorn) – 4:57
2. "Take the 'A' Train" (Strayhorn) – 2:50 Vocal by Ray Nance
3. "Such Sweet Thunder" (Elington, Strayhorn) – 2:54
4. "Frustration" – 3:39
5. "Cop Out" – 3:14
6. "Perdido" (Juan Tizol, Ervin Drake, Hans Lengsfelder) – 4:34
7. "Mood Indigo" (Ellington, Barney Bigard, Irving Mills) – 8:05
8. "Bassment" – 4:30

Disc 2

1. "Sophisticated Lady" (Ellington, Mills, Mitchell Parish) – 3:56
2. "Stardust" (Hoagy Carmichael, Parish) – 3:54
3. "Jeeps Blues" (Ellington, Johnny Hodges) – 5:58
4. "All of Me" (Gerald Marks, Seymour Simons) – 2:38
5. "Diminuendo and Crescendo in Blue" – 11:60
6. "I Got It Bad (and That Ain't Good)" (Ellington, Paul Francis Webster) – 3:26
7. "On the Sunny Side of the Street" (Jimmy McHugh, Dorothy Fields) – 4:34

== Personnel ==
- Duke Ellington – piano
- Shorty Baker, Willie Cook, Ray Nance, Clark Terry – trumpet
- Quentin Jackson, Britt Woodman – trombone
- John Sanders – valve trombone
- Jimmy Hamilton – clarinet, tenor saxophone
- Johnny Hodges – alto saxophone
- Russell Procope – alto saxophone, clarinet
- Paul Gonsalves – tenor saxophone
- Harry Carney – baritone saxophone
- Joe Benjamin – bass
- Sam Woodyard – drums
