= Can't Help Swinging =

Studio album by Jimmy Hamilton
- Released: 1961
- Recorded: April 4, 1961
- Studio: Van Gelder Studio, Englewood Cliffs, New Jersey
- Genre: Jazz
- Length: 39:08
- Label: Swingville; SV 2028
- Producer: Esmond Edwards

Jimmy Hamilton chronology
It's About Time (1961)	Can't Help Swinging (1961)	Things Ain't What They Used to Be (1961)

Can't Help Swinging is an album by saxophonist Jimmy Hamilton which was recorded in 1961 and released on the Swingville label.

== Reception ==
Professional ratings
Review scores
Source	Rating
Allmusic	4/5 stars
The Penguin Guide to Jazz Recordings	3/4 stars

Scott Yanow of Allmusic states: "The Can't Help Swingin' album showcases Hamilton with pianist Tommy Flanagan, bassist Wendell Marshall and drummer Earl Williams in a quartet. Although Hamilton plays some clarinet (most notably on the atmospheric 'Dancing on the Ceiling'), the emphasis throughout both sets is on his rarely heard tenor. He is less bop-oriented and more basic on the bigger horn than on his usual ax, swinging hard and showing just how strong a tenor player he could be. Worth exploring". All About Jazz said "Jimmy was the sole horn ... The tone is more intimate, showing his sweet side; it would have been perfect on the Moodsville label".

== Track listing ==
All compositions by Jimmy Hamilton except where noted

1. "Panfried" – 7:07
2. "Lullaby of the Leaves" (Bernice Petkere, Joe Young) – 4:36
3. "Baby Won't You Please Come Home" (Charles Warfield, Clarence Williams) – 4:39
4. "Definite Difference" – 3:13
5. "There Is No Greater Love" (Isham Jones, Marty Symes) – 6:01
6. "Dancing on the Ceiling" (Richard Rodgers, Lorenz Hart) – 6:32
7. "Route 9W" – 3:46
8. "Town Tavern Rag" – 3:14

== Personnel ==
- Jimmy Hamilton – tenor saxophone, clarinet
- Tommy Flanagan – piano
- Wendell Marshall – bass
- Earl Williams – drums
