= The Mooche =

1928 song by Duke Ellington and Irving Mills

Song
- Language: English
- A-side: "Hot and Bothered"
- Published: October 1, 1928
- Studio: Okeh Records
- Genre: Jazz
- Length: 3:20
- Composers: Duke Ellington and Irving Mills

"The Mooche" (1928)
Sample of "The Mooche" with scat vocals by Gertrude "Baby" Cox.

"The Mooche" is an American jazz song, composed in 1928 by Duke Ellington and Irving Mills, originally recorded with scat singing by vocalist Gertrude "Baby" Cox. The song is considered one of Ellington's signature pieces, and he performed it frequently and recorded it many times over 45 years.

Among the jazz musicians who recorded the original version of the song was James "Bubber" Miley, whom Ellington described as "the epitome of soul and a master of the plunger mute". However, Miley's alcoholism and his consequent unreliability would lead to his parting with Ellington's band. Four years later, on May 20, 1932, Miley died of tuberculosis. He was 29 years old. Despite his early death, Gioia states "no one, apart from Duke himself, did more than Miley to shape the early Ellington sound".

Ellington composed the song "for a high reed trio, playing one of the most eerie and haunting themes he had created up to that time. The first theme, a sixteen-bar melody in C minor with interpolations by Miley, is followed by an eight-bar orchestral interlude tutti, and than comes a blues theme in Eb, and segues to a low register solo by [Barney] Bigard in Eb minor. A [Lonnie] Johnson solo is followed by a Miley-inspired scat vocal by Baby Cox."

The song is in the so-called "jungle style" and includes the clarinet and muted trumpet typical of Ellington's work. The song has three different keys C minor for the first theme and the interlude, the blues sections are in Eb major and Eb minor.

The title, sometimes spelled "mooch", is a word that normally refers to someone who constantly borrows but does not pay back; however, in 1933, Ellington explained that his title referred to "a certain lazy gait peculiar to some of the folk of Harlem".
