= Harlem Speaks =

Song by Duke Ellington

Song by Duke Ellington
- Released: 1935
- Studio: Decca Studios, London, England
- Genre: Jazz
- Composer: Duke Ellington

Harlem Speaks (1935) is a jazz song by Duke Ellington, made in response to the film Africa Speaks (1930). Ellington recorded the song at Decca Studios in London, England. Gunther Schuller said that the London recording was his best recording, "a typical array of “hot” solos (the way Spike Hughes liked them), ending with an all-stops-pulled-out ensemble chorus, replete with riffing brass, torrid Nanton growls, and surging Bigard obbligatos." It was also recorded by Charlie Barnet in 1941.

Harlem Speaks is also the name of an album by Duke Ellington.
