= Sam Woodyard =

American jazz drummer (1925–1988)

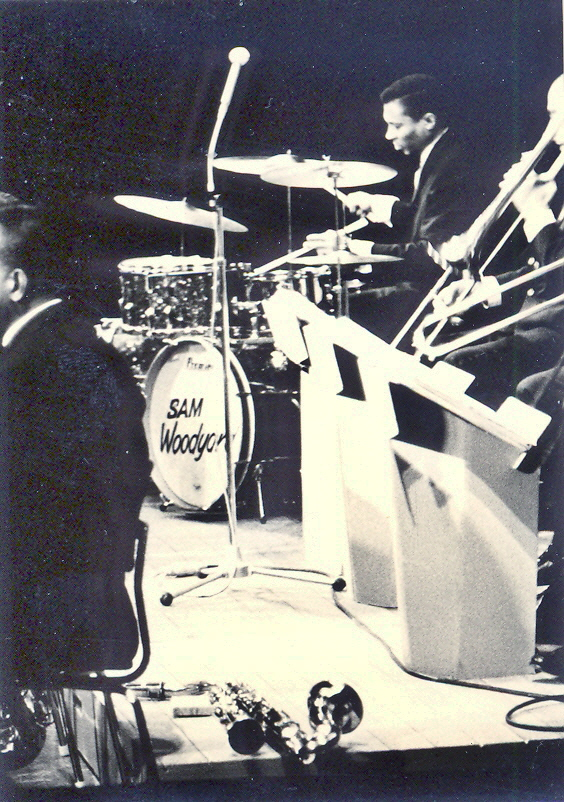
- Woodyard in 1965

Background information
- Born: January 7, 1925; Elizabeth, New Jersey, U.S.
- Died: September 20, 1988 (aged 63) Paris, France
- Genres: Jazz; R&B
- Occupation: Musician
- Instrument: Drums
- Years active: 1940s–1988
- Formerly of: Duke Ellington

Sam Woodyard (January 7, 1925 – September 20, 1988) was an American jazz drummer.

Woodyard was born in Elizabeth, New Jersey, United States. He was largely self-taught on drums and played locally in the Newark, New Jersey, area in the 1940s. He performed with Paul Gayten in an R&B group, then played in the early 1950s with Joe Holiday, Roy Eldridge, and Milt Buckner. In 1955, he joined Duke Ellington's orchestra, with whom he remained until 1966.

After his time with Ellington, Woodyard worked with Ella Fitzgerald, then moved to Los Angeles. In the 1970s, he played less due to health problems, but he recorded with Buddy Rich and toured with Claude Bolling. In 1983, he belonged to a band with Teddy Wilson, Buddy Tate, and Slam Stewart. His last recording was in 1988 on Steve Lacy's album The Door.

Woodyard died of cancer in Paris at the age of 63.

== Discography ==
With Cat Anderson

- Plays at 4 A.M. (Columbia, 1958)
- Ellingtonia (Wynne, 1959)
- A Chat with Cat Anderson (Columbia, 1963)

With Duke Ellington

- Ellington at Newport (Columbia, 1956)
- Duke Ellington Presents... (Bethlehem, 1956)
- A Drum Is a Woman (Columbia, 1957)
- Such Sweet Thunder (Columbia, 1957)
- The Cosmic Scene (Columbia, 1958)
- Newport 1958 (Columbia, 1958)
- Ellington Indigos (Columbia, 1958)
- Black, Brown and Beige (Columbia, 1958)
- Jazz Party (Columbia, 1959)
- Festival Session (Columbia, 1959)
- Solitude (Philips, 1960)
- The Nutcracker Suite (Columbia, 1960)
- Piano in the Background (Columbia, 1960)
- Piano in the Foreground (Columbia, 1961)
- First Time! The Count Meets the Duke (Columbia, 1961)
- Afro-Bossa (Reprise, 1963)
- Duke Ellington Meets Coleman Hawkins (Impulse!, 1963)
- Duke Ellington & John Coltrane (Impulse!, 1963)
- Duke Ellington & Django Reinhardt (Amiga, 1963)
- The Symphonic Ellington (Reprise, 1964)
- Ellington '65 (Reprise, 1965)
- The Popular Duke Ellington (RCA Victor, 1966)
- Ella and Duke at the Cote D'Azur (Verve, 1967)
- ...And His Mother Called Him Bill (RCA, 1968)
- Second Sacred Concert (Fantasy, 1968)
- Francis A. & Edward K. (Reprise, 1968)
- The Great Paris Concert (Atlantic, 1973)
- Yale Concert (Fantasy, 1973)
- Jazz at the Plaza Vol. II (Columbia, 1973)
- The Pianist (Fantasy, 1974)
- The Duke Lives On (Midi, 1974)
- Duke Ellington's Jazz Violin Session (Atlantic, 1976)
- All Star Road Band (Doctor Jazz, 1983)
- All Star Road Band Volume 2 (Doctor Jazz, 1985)
- Hot Summer Dance (Red Baron, 1991)

With Johnny Hodges

- Ellingtonia '56 (Norgran, 1956)
- Duke's in Bed (Verve, 1956)
- The Big Sound (Verve, 1957)
- Blues A-Plenty (Verve, 1958)
- Not So Dukish (Verve, 1958)
- Johnny Hodges with Billy Strayhorn and the Orchestra (Verve, 1962)
- Swing's Our Thing with Earl Hines (Verve, 1968)
- Ellingtonia! (Onyx, 1974)
- At the Sportpalast Berlin (Pablo, 1978)

With others

- Alice Babs, Serenade to Sweden (Telestar, 1966)
- Harry Carney, Rock Me Gently (Metronome, 1961)
- Rosemary Clooney, Blue Rose (Columbia, 1956)
- Paul Gonsalves, Cookin' (Argo, 1958)
- Jimmy Hamilton, Clarinet in High Fi (Urania, 1955)
- Jimmy Hamilton, Swing Low, Sweet Clarinet (World Record Club, 1963)
- Lionel Hampton, Ring Dem Vibes (Blue Star, 1976)
- Quincy Jones, The Birth of a Band! (Mercury, 1959)
- Brooks Kerr and Paul Quinichette, Prevue (Famous Door, 1974)
- Steve Lacy, The Door (RCA Novus, 1989)
- Buddy Rich, The Roar of '74 (Groove Merchant, 1974)
- Joya Sherrill, Joya Sherrill Sings Duke (20th Century Fox, 1965)
- Billy Strayhorn, Live! (Roulette, 1969)
- Clark Terry, Duke with a Difference (Riverside, 1957)
- Clark Terry, Out on a Limb with Clark Terry (Argo, 1957)
- Clark Terry, Cruising (Milestone, 1975)
- Norris Turney, I Let a Song... (Black & Blue, 1978)
- Jimmy Woode, The Colorful Strings of Jimmy Woode (Argo, 1958)
