= Doctor Jazz Records =

American jazz recording label

Doctor Jazz Records was established by Bob Thiele in 1983 to release new material, historical recordings, and albums previously released on his Flying Dutchman, Signature, Hanover, Amsterdam and Bob Thiele Music labels. Some of these releases had Signature labels. The label ceased to release albums in 1987 and Thiele established Red Baron Records in 1991.

== Discography ==
Catalog No. (FW or W2X for 2LP)	Album	Artist	Details
38445	Arnie Lawrence and Treasure Island	Arnie Lawrence	
38446	Classic Tenors	Coleman Hawkins / Lester Young	
38447	Dreams of Tomorrow	Lonnie Liston Smith	
38448	On the Road Again	Teresa Brewer and Stephane Grappelli	
38521	Teresa Brewer at Carrnegie Hall	Teresa Brewer	Two record set
38534	I Dig Big Band Singers	Teresa Brewer	
38727	Live at Carnegie Hall	Stephane Grappelli	
38728	Shelly Manne and his Friends	Shelly Manne	Reissue of Flying Dutchman FDS 10150
38729	Steve Allen’s Hip Fables	Al "Jazzbo" Collins and Slim Gaillard	
38810	We Love You Fats	Teresa Brewer and Earl “Fatha” Hines	
38836	The Songs of Bessie Smith	Teresa Brewer and Count Basie	Reissue of Flying Dutchman FDS 10161
38851	Classic Pianos	Erroll Garner / Earl "Fatha" Hines / James P. Johnson / Art Hodes	
39137	All Star Road Band	Duke Ellington	Two record set
39150	June Night	Svend Asmussen	
39204	Gato…Para Los Amigos!!	Gato Barbieri	
39418	Hi Ho Trailus Boot Whip	Anita O’Day	Reissue of Bob Thiele Music 1 0595
39419	A Melody from the Sky	Flip Phillips	
39420	Silhouettes	Lonnie Liston Smith	
39421	Teresa Brewer in London	Teresa Brewer	Reissue of the Amsterdam AMS 12015. This album is on the Signature Label.
38447	Dreams of Tomorrow	Lonnie Liston Smith	
39519	Classic Tenors Volume 2	Coleman Hawkins / Dickie Wells / Julian Dash / Eddie Davis	
39520	Afrique	Count Basie	Reissue of Flying Dutchman FDS 10138
39521	Live at Carnegie Hall and Montreux, Switzerland	Teresa Brewer	Two record set
39524	Oily Rags	Oily Rags	This album is on the Signature label. Reissue of BSL 1 0598.
39876	The 20’s Score Again	Bob Thiele and his Orchestra	Reissue of Signature BSL 1 0555
40012	All Star Road Band Volume 2	Duke Ellington	Two record set
40029	Hot and Bothered (A Re-Creation)	Mercer Ellington	
40030	Happy Reunion	Duke Ellington	
40031	The Cotton Connection	Teresa Brewer with Mercer Ellington	
40063	Rejuvenation	Lonnie Liston Smith	
40064	That’s a Plenty	Yank Lawson	Reissue of the Bob Thiele Music BBM 1 0941
40111	Acoustical Suspension	Teo Macero	
40112	A Touch of Ragtime	George Segal and the Imperial Jazz Band	This album is on the Signature Label and is a reissue of Signature BSL 1 0654
40113	Teresa Brewer at Christmas Time	Teresa Brewer	This album is on the Signature Label and is a reissue of Coral CRL 57144
40155	Moving Lines	Don Sebesky	
40183	Apasionado	Gato Barbieri	
40231	American Music Box Volume 1: The Songs of Irving Berlin	Teresa Brewer	
40232	Midnight Cafe (A Few More For The Road)	Teresa Brewer	
40233	On the Good Ship Lollipop	Teresa Brewer and Svend Asmussen	
40234	What a Wonderful World	Bobby Hackett	Reissue of Flying Dutchman FDS 10159
40349	Setting Standards	Phil Mattson and the PM Singers	
40350	Air Play	Benny Goodman	Two record set
40358	Whatever Happened to Johnny Bothwell	Johnny Bothwell	Reissue of Bob Thiele Music 1
40359	New Mood Indigo	Duke Ellington	
40525	Now’s the Time	Ray Bryant	Reissue of Hanover SM 6008
40526	Love Strokes	Gary Lemel and Bill Marx	
40527	Jubilee	Phil Mattson and the PM Singers	
40550	Soul of Toots Thielemans	Toots Thielemans	
40612	Make Someone Happy	Lonnie Liston Smith	
40706	Feel the Good Music of Doctor Jazz	Various Artists	
40950	Big Three	Coleman Hawkins / Lester Young / Ben Webster	
40951	Good News	Teresa Brewer	
40952	Oh Lord, Let Me Do No Wrong	Pharoah Sanders	
45256	What a Wonderful World	Teresa Brewer	This is on the Signature label
