= Britt Woodman =

American jazz trombonist (1920–2000)

- Born: June 4, 1920; Los Angeles, California, U.S.
- Died: October 13, 2000 (aged 80) Hawthorne, California, U.S.
- Genre: Jazz
- Occupation: Musician
- Instrument: Trombone
- Years active: 1940s–1990s
- Formerly of: Lionel Hampton; Duke Ellington; Charles Mingus

Britt Woodman (June 4, 1920 – October 13, 2000) was an American jazz trombonist.

== Career ==
Woodman was a childhood friend of Charles Mingus, but first worked with Phil Moore and Les Hite. After serving in World War II, he played with Boyd Raeburn before joining with Lionel Hampton in 1946. During the 1950s, he worked with Duke Ellington. As a member of Ellington's orchestra, he can be heard on Such Sweet Thunder (1957), Ella Fitzgerald Sings the Duke Ellington Song Book (1957), Black, Brown and Beige (1958), and Ellington Indigos (1958).

In 1960, he left Ellington to work in a pit orchestra. He later worked with Mingus and can be heard on the album Mingus Mingus Mingus Mingus Mingus (1963). In the 1970s, he led his own octet and worked with pianist Toshiko Akiyoshi. In 1989, he was on the album Epitaph, dedicated to the previously unrecorded music of Mingus.

Woodman died in Hawthorne, California, at the age of 80, having suffered severe respiratory problems.

== Discography ==
=== As sideman ===
With the Toshiko Akiyoshi – Lew Tabackin Big Band

- Long Yellow Road (RCA, 1975)
- Tales of a Courtesan (RCA Victor, 1976)
- Insights (RCA, 1976)

With Bill Berry

- Hot & Happy (Beez, 1974)
- Hello Rev (Concord Jazz, 1976)
- For Duke (M&K RealTime, 1978)

With Duke Ellington

- Ellington Uptown (Columbia, 1953)
- Seattle Concert (RCA Victor, 1954)
- Ellington '55 (Capitol, 1955)
- Dance to the Duke! (Capitol, 1954)
- Ellington Showcase (Capitol, 1955)
- Historically Speaking (Bethlehem, 1956)
- Duke Ellington Presents... (Bethlehem, 1956)
- Ellington at Newport (Columbia, 1956)
- Such Sweet Thunder (Columbia, 1957)
- A Drum Is a Woman (Columbia, 1957)
- Ellington Indigos (Columbia, 1958)
- Newport 1958 (Columbia, 1958)
- The Cosmic Scene (Columbia, 1958)
- Black, Brown and Beige (Columbia, 1958)
- Ellington Moods (SESAC, 1959)
- Jazz Party (Columbia, 1959)
- The Nutcracker Suite (Columbia, 1960)
- Solitude (Philips, 1960)
- Piano in the Background (Philips, 1960)
- Selections from Peer Gynt Suites (Columbia, 1960)
- Concert at Carnegie Hall (DJM, 1976)
- The Elegant Mister Ellington (Swing House, 1978)
- Jungle Triangle (Black Lion, 1983)
- All Star Road Band (Doctor Jazz, 1983)
- Hot Summer Dance (Red Baron, 1991)

With Ella Fitzgerald

- Ella Fitzgerald Sings the Duke Ellington Song Book (Verve, 1957)
- Rhythm Is My Business (Verve, 1962)
- Things Ain't What They Used to Be (And You Better Believe It) (Reprise, 1970)

With Lionel Hampton

- In Concert (Durium, 1975)
- Hamp's Big Band Live! (Glad-Hamp, 1979)
- Leapin' with Lionel (Affinity, 1983)
- Newport Uproar! (RCA Victor, 1968)

With Johnny Hodges

- Ellingtonia '56 (Norgran, 1956)
- The Big Sound (Verve, 1957)
- Everybody Knows (Impulse!, 1964)

With Charles Mingus

- Mingus (Candid, 1961)
- Mingus Mingus Mingus Mingus Mingus (Impulse!, 1964)
- Epitaph (Columbia, 1990)
- The Complete Town Hall Concert (United Artists, 1962)

With Jimmy Smith

- Bashin': The Unpredictable Jimmy Smith (Verve, 1962)
- Plays Walk on the Wild Side and the Preacher (Verve, 1963)
- Peter and the Wolf (Verve, 1966)
- Hoochie Coochie Man (Verve, 1966)

With others

- Gene Ammons, Free Again (Prestige, 1972)
- Ray Brown, With the All-Star Big Band (Verve, 1962)
- Ruth Brown, Ruth Brown '65 (Mainstream, 1965)
- Ruth Brown, Softly (Mainstream, 1972)
- Frank Capp and Nat Pierce, Juggernaut (Concord Jazz, 1977)
- Frank Capp and Nat Pierce, Live at the Century Plaza (Concord Jazz, 1978)
- Benny Carter, Live and Well in Japan! (Pablo, 1978)
- Benny Carter, Central City Sketches (MusicMasters, 1987)
- Rosemary Clooney and Duke Ellington, Blue Rose (Columbia, 1956)
- John Coltrane, Africa/Brass (Impulse!, 1961)
- Randy Crawford, Everything Must Change (Warner Bros., 1976)
- Tadd Dameron, The Magic Touch (Riverside, 1962)
- Miles Davis, Blue Moods (Debut, 1955)
- Booker Ervin, Booker 'n' Brass (Pacific Jazz, 1968)
- John Fahey, Old Fashioned Love (Takoma, 1975)
- Dizzy Gillespie, Gillespiana (Verve, 1960)
- Dizzy Gillespie, Carnegie Hall Concert (Verve, 1961)
- Benny Golson, Killer Joe (Columbia, 1977)
- Chico Hamilton, The Gamut (Solid State, 1968)
- Jimmy Hamilton, It's About Time (Prestige/Swingville, 1961)
- Hank Jones and Oliver Nelson, Happenings (Impulse!, 1966)
- Philly Joe Jones, To Tadd with Love (Uptown, 1982)
- Jon Lucien, Premonition (Columbia, 1976)
- Galt MacDermot, Hair Pieces (Verve/Forecast, 1968)
- Teo Macero, Impressions of Charles Mingus (Palo Alto, 1983)
- Junior Mance, The Soul of Hollywood (Jazzland, 1962)
- The Manhattan Transfer, Pastiche (Atlantic, 1978)
- Wade Marcus, Metamorphosis ABC (Impulse!, 1976)
- Blue Mitchell, Smooth as the Wind (Riverside, 1961)
- Grover Mitchell, Meet Grover Mitchell (Jazz Chronicles, 1979)
- James Moody, The Blues and Other Colors (Milestone, 1969)
- Maria Muldaur, Sweet Harmony (Reprise, 1976)
- Oliver Nelson, Afro/American Sketches (Prestige, 1962)
- Oliver Nelson, Impressions of Phaedra (United Artists, 1962)
- Oscar Peterson, Bursting Out with the All-Star Big Band! (Verve, 1962)
- Zoot Sims, Passion Flower (Pablo, 1980)
- Billy Taylor, Taylor Made Jazz (Argo, 1959)
- Billy Taylor, Right Here, Right Now! (Capitol, 1963)
- Clark Terry, Duke with a Difference (Riverside, 1957)
- Clark Terry, Cruising (Milestone, 1975)
- Clark Terry, Squeeze Me! (Chiaroscuro, 1989)
- Teri Thornton, Devil May Care (Riverside, 1961)
- Jimmy Woode, The Colorful Strings of Jimmy Woode (Argo, 1957)
