= Cat Anderson =

American jazz trumpeter (1916–1981)

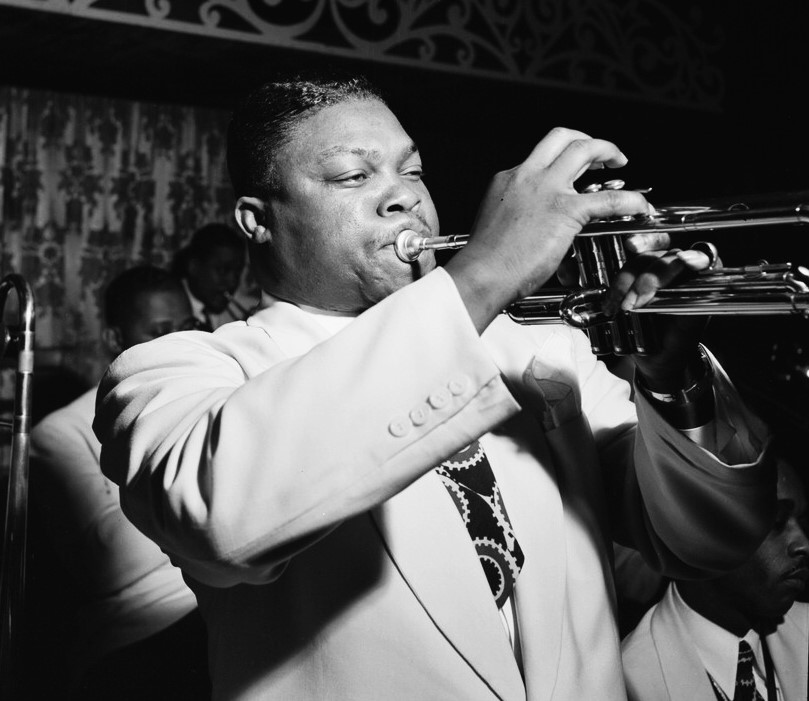
- Anderson in New York, c. 1947

Background information
- Also known as: Cat Anderson
- Born: William Alonzo Anderson; September 12, 1916; Greenville, South Carolina, U.S.
- Died: April 29, 1981 (aged 64) Norwalk, California, U.S.
- Genres: Jazz
- Occupation: Musician
- Instrument: Trumpet
- Years active: 1930s–1970s
- Labels: Columbia; Inner City; Mercury; EMI; Apollo; Strand; Philips; All Life; Parker

William Alonzo "Cat" Anderson (September 12, 1916 – April 29, 1981) was an American jazz trumpeter known for his long period as a member of Duke Ellington's orchestra and for his wide range, especially his ability to play in the altissimo register.

== Biography ==
=== Early life ===
Born in Greenville, South Carolina, Anderson lost both parents when he was four years old, and was sent to live at the Jenkins Orphanage in Charleston, where he learned to play trumpet. Classmates gave him the nickname "Cat" (which he used all his life) based on his fighting style.

=== Career ===
He toured and made his first recording with the Carolina Cotton Pickers, a small group based at the orphanage. After leaving the Cotton Pickers, Anderson played with guitarist Hartley Toots, Claude Hopkins' big band, Doc Wheeler's Sunset Orchestra (1938–1942), with whom he also recorded, Lucky Millinder, the Erskine Hawkins Orchestra, Sabby Lewis's Orchestra, and Lionel Hampton, with whom he recorded the classic "Flying Home No. 2".

Anderson's career took off, however, in 1944, when he joined Duke Ellington's orchestra, at the Earle Theater in Philadelphia. He quickly became a central part of Ellington's sound. Although Anderson was a very versatile musician, capable of playing in a number of jazz styles (Leonard Feather described his style as "somewhere between Louis Armstrong and Harry James), he is most renowned for his abilities in the extreme high or "altissimo" range. He had a big sound in all registers, but could play up to a "triple C" (the highest Bb note on a piano keyboard) with great power (he was able to perform his high-note solos without a microphone, while other members of a big band were usually amplified for their solos). Wynton Marsalis called him "one of the best" high-note trumpeters.

But Anderson was much more than just a high-note trumpeter—he was also a master of half valve and plunger mute playing. Author and jazz critic Dan Morgenstern said of Cat that "he was...the [Ellington] band's Number One utility trumpeter, capable of filling in for anyone else who was not there." He played with Ellington's band from 1944 to 1947, from 1950 to 1959, and from 1961 to 1971, with each break corresponding to a brief hiatus to lead and front his own big band. In addition to his work on trumpet, he was a very skilled arranger and composer—he performed his own compositions "El Gato" and "Bluejean Beguine" with Ellington, and others of his compositions and arrangements with his own band, for example on his 1959 record album for Mercury, Cat on a Hot Tin Horn.

=== Personal life and death ===
After 1971, Anderson settled in the Los Angeles area, where he continued to play studio sessions, to perform with local bands (including Louie Bellson's and Bill Berry's big bands), and to tour Europe. He died of brain cancer in 1981.

== Discography ==
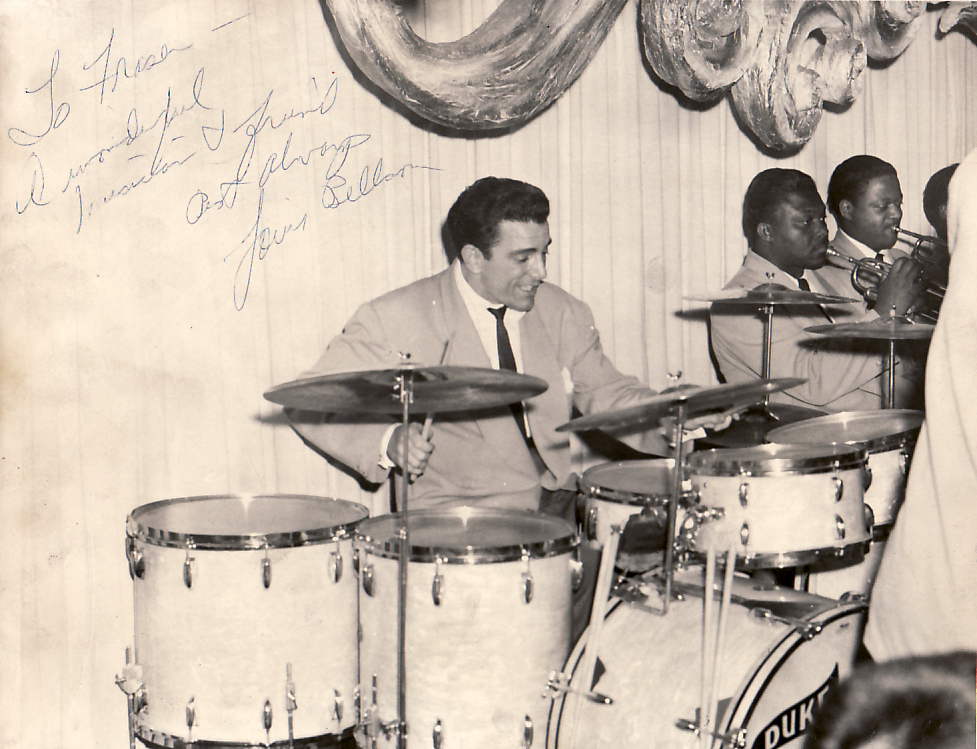
From left: Louie Bellson, Cat Anderson, Clark Terry at the Palomar Supper Club, April 19, 1952, with the Duke Ellington Orchestra; Photo courtesy of the Fraser MacPherson estate

- Cat Anderson Plays at 4 AM (Columbia [France, EMI], 1958)
- Cat on a Hot Tin Horn (Mercury, 1958)
- A Chat with Cat Anderson (Columbia [France, EMI], 1963)
- Cat Speaks (Black & Blue, 1977)
- Plays W.C. Handy (Black & Blue, 1978)
- Americans Swinging in Paris (EMI, 2002; CD reissue of the two French Columbia albums)
- Cat Speaks: The Definitive Black and Blue Sessions (Black & Blue, 2002)

=== As sideman ===
With Gene Ammons

- Free Again (Prestige, 1971)

With Louie Bellson

- The Louis Bellson Explosion (Pablo, 1975)
- Ecue Ritmos Cubanos (1977)
- Sunshine Rock (1978)

With Duke Ellington

- 1951 Masterpieces by Ellington (Columbia)
- 1952 At The Crystal Gardens (Hep, 2CD, 2011)
- 1953 Ellington Uptown (Columbia)
- 1953 The 1953 Pasadena Concert (GNP Crescendo, 1986)
- 1954 Ellington '55 (Capitol)
- 1955 Ellington Showcase (Capitol)
- 1956 A Drum Is a Woman (Columbia)
- 1956 Duke Ellington Presents... (Bethlehem)
- 1956 First Annual Connecticut Jazz Festival (IAJRC, 1993)
- 1956 Historically Speaking (Bethlehem)
- 1956 Ellington at Newport (Columbia)
- 1957 All Star Road Band (Doctor Jazz, 1983)
- 1957 Ellington Indigos (Columbia)
- 1957 Such Sweet Thunder (Columbia)
- 1958 Black Brown and Beige (Columbia)
- 1958 Newport 1958 (Columbia)
- 1959 Festival Session (Columbia)
- 1959 Jazz Party (Columbia)
- 1959 Live at the Blue Note (Roulette)
- 1960 Blues in Orbit (Columbia)
- 1961 First Time! The Count Meets the Duke (Columbia)
- 1961 S.R.O. (LRC, 1989)
- 1962 Featuring Paul Gonsalves (Fantasy, 1985)
- 1963 Afro-Bossa (Reprise)
- 1963 The Great Paris Concert (Atlantic, 1973)
- 1963 The Symphonic Ellington (Reprise)
- 1964 All Star Road Band Volume 2 (Doctor Jazz, 1985)
- 1964 Duke Ellington Plays Mary Poppins (Reprise)
- 1964 Ellington '65 (Reprise)
- 1964 Harlem (Pablo Live, 1985)
- 1965 1965 Revisited 3 (Affinity, 1991)
- 1965 Concert in the Virgin Islands (Reprise)
- 1965 Ellington '66 (Reprise)
- 1966 Soul Call (Verve)
- 1966 Ella and Duke at the Cote D'Azur (Verve)
- 1966 Far East Suite (RCA)
- 1967 ...And His Mother Called Him Bill (RCA)
- 1967 Francis A. & Edward K. (Reprise)
- 1967 Big Bands Live: Liederhalle Stuttgart (Jazzhaus)
- 1968 Second Sacred Concert (Prestige)
- 1968 Yale Concert (Fantasy, 1973)
- 1969 Standards: Live at the Salle Pleyel (Jazz Music Yesterday (Italy), 1991)
- 1969 Live At The Opernhaus Cologne (Jazzline, 2016)
- 1969 70th Birthday Concert (Solid State)
- 1969–71 Up in Duke's Workshop (Pablo, 1976)
- 1970 New Orleans Suite (Atlantic)
- 1977 The Carnegie Hall Concerts: December 1944
- 1977 The Carnegie Hall Concerts: January 1946

With Ella Fitzgerald

- Sings the Duke Ellington Songbook (Verve, 1957)
- Ella at Duke's Place (Verve, 1965)

With Lionel Hampton

- Lionel Hampton and His Jazz Giants 77 (CBS MasterWorks, 1977)
- All-Star Band at Newport (Timeless, 1978)
- Live: 50th Anniversary Concert (Sultra, 1981; Half Note, 1999)

With Johnny Hodges

- Ellingtonia '56 (Norgran, 1956)
- The Big Sound (Verve, 1957)
- Johnny Hodges with Billy Strayhorn and the Orchestra (Verve, 1962)
- Everybody Knows Johnny Hodges (Impulse!, 1964)
- Triple Play (RCA Victor, 1967)
- Swing's Our Thing (Verve, 1967)

With Quincy Jones

- 1973 You've Got It Bad Girl (A&M)
- 1976 I Heard That! (A&M)

With others

- 1956 Blue Rose, Rosemary Clooney (Columbia)
- 1956 Porgy and Bess, Frances Faye/Mel Tormé (Bethlehem)
- 1966 Once Upon a Time, Earl Hines
- 1976 Hello Rev, Bill Berry (Concord Jazz)
- 1977 'Live and Well in Japan!, Benny Carter (Pablo)
- 1979 Jazz Gala, Claude Bolling (America Records)
