= Johnny Hodges with Billy Strayhorn and the Orchestra =

1962 album by Johnny Hodges

Studio album by Johnny Hodges
- Released: June 1962
- Recorded: December 11 & 12, 1961
- Studio: Van Gelder Studio, Englewood Cliffs, NJ
- Genre: Jazz
- Length: 36:27
- Label: Verve - V 8452
- Producer: Creed Taylor

Johnny Hodges chronology
Blue Hodge (1961)	Johnny Hodges with Billy Strayhorn and the Orchestra (1962)	Johnny Hodges at Sportpalast Berlin (1968)

Johnny Hodges with Billy Strayhorn and the Orchestra is a 1962 studio album by Johnny Hodges accompanied by an orchestra arranged by Billy Strayhorn. The album features many members of Duke Ellington's orchestra.

The album was reissued on CD by Verve in 1999, and on LP by Speakers Corner and Analogue Productions in 2013.

== Reception ==
Professional ratings
Review scores
Source	Rating
Allmusic	4/5 stars
The Penguin Guide to Jazz Recordings	3.5/4 stars

Ken Dryden on Allmusic.com gave the album four stars out of five, commenting: "Hodges is never less than superb throughout this reissue...Strayhorn's exotic chart of 'Azure' and emotional scoring of 'Your Love Has Faded' are especially striking. Recommended." Dryden also singled out the performances of trombonist Lawrence Brown, saxophonist Harry Carney, trumpeter Howard McGhee, and pianist Jimmy Jones for praise.

Johnny Hodges with Billy Strayhorn and the Orchestra was reviewed by Don DeMichael in the June 7, 1962 edition of Downbeat.

The March 12, 1962 edition of Billboard highlighted the album as having 'Strong Sales Potential', rating it with four stars. Billboard said it was a "strong set, bound to please Hodges many fans".
