= Newport 1958 =

Studio album by Duke Ellington
- Released: 1958
- Recorded: July 3, 1958; July 21, 1958
- Venue: Newport Jazz Festival, Rhode Island
- Studio: Columbia 30th Street, New York
- Genre: Jazz
- Length: 98:18
- Label: Columbia
- Producer: Irving Townsend-Original Recordings, Nedra Olds-Neal-Double CD Reissue, Michael Cuscuna-Mosaic Records Reissue

Duke Ellington chronology
| Happy Reunion (1956) | Newport 1958 (1958) | Jazz at the Plaza Vol. II (1958) |

Professional ratings
Review scores
| Source | Rating |
|---|---|
| AllMusic | 4.5/5 stars |
| The Penguin Guide to Jazz Recordings | 3.5/4 stars |

Newport 1958 is a 1958 album by Duke Ellington, recorded at the Newport Jazz Festival of that year and later in the Columbia recording studio. It was released two years after Ellington at Newport, the 1956 album that led to Ellington's career resurgence.

The original album, Newport 1958, and the French Columbia CD #COL 468436 2 are mostly studio re-recordings of numbers performed at Newport. There is also dubbed in applause and crowd noise from Newport.

During this time, Ellington was frequently re-recording pieces that were performed live in the studio to be included on "live" albums. This was because he felt the live performances were not up to his standards. Only the tracks "Just Scratchin' the Surface" and "Prima Bara Dubla" are from Newport on the original album. The double CD is all the music performed at Newport on July 3, 1958. The third CD was issued by Mosaic Records and contains all of the original album, minus the dubbed in crowd noise and applause. It also contains select live tracks from Newport to fill out the CD.

== Newport 1958 (Original Album) ==
=== Track listing ===
1. "Just Scratchin' the Surface" (Duke Ellington) - 6:45
2. "El Gato" (William "Cat" Anderson) - 4:18
3. "Happy Reunion" (Duke Ellington) - 2:58
4. "Multi-Colored Blue" (Billy Strayhorn) - 5:33
5. "Princess Blue" (Duke Ellington) - 10:33
6. "Jazz Festival Jazz" (Duke Ellington, Billy Strayhorn) - 7:20
7. "Mr. Gentle and Mr. Cool" (Harold Shorty Baker, (Duke Ellington) - 7:06
8. "Juniflip" (Duke Ellington) - 3:49
9. "Prima Bara Dubla" (Duke Ellington, Billy Strayhorn) - 5:43
10. "Hi Fi Fo Fum" (Duke Ellington) - 5:58

== Live at Newport 1958 ==
=== Track listing ===
Disc one

1. Introduction by Willis Conover - 1:12
2. "Take the 'A' Train" [excerpt] (Billy Strayhorn) - 0:45
3. "Princess Blue" (Duke Ellington) - 12:18
4. "Duke's Place" (Duke Ellington, Bill Katz, Bob Thiele) - 2:44
5. "Just Scratchin' the Surface" (Duke Ellington) - 6:24
6. "Happy Reunion" (Duke Ellington) - 3:21
7. "Juniflip" (Duke Ellington) - 4:02
8. "Mr. Gentle and Mr. Cool" (Harold Shorty Baker, Duke Ellington) - 7:17
9. "Jazz Festival Jazz" (Duke Ellington, Billy Strayhorn) - 7:08
10. "Feet Bone" (Duke Ellington) - 3:10

Disc two

1. "Hi Fi Fo Fum" (Duke Ellington) - 7:52
2. "I Got It Bad (and That Ain't Good)" (Duke Ellington, Paul Francis Webster) - 3:42
3. "Bill Bailey, Won't You Please Come Home" (Hughie Cannon) - 2:55
4. "Prima Bara Dubla" (Duke Ellington, Billy Strayhorn) - 6:52
5. "El Gato" (William "Cat" Anderson) - 4:43
6. "Multi-Colored Blue" (Billy Strayhorn) - 6:32
7. Introduction to Mahalia Jackson (Willis Conover) - 1:54
8. "Come Sunday" (Duke Ellington) - 7:08
9. "Keep Your Hand on the Plow" (traditional) - 5:20
10. "Take the 'A' Train" [excerpt] (Billy Strayhorn) - 0:31
11. "Jones" (Duke Ellington, Pauline Reddon) - 2:28

== Newport 1958 (Mosaic Records Issue) ==
=== Track listing ===
Studio tracks

1. "El Gato" (William "Cat" Anderson) - 4:10
2. "Happy Reunion" (Duke Ellington) - 2:03
3. "Multi-Colored Blue" (Billy Strayhorn) - 5:00
4. "Princess Blue" (Duke Ellington) - 10:26
5. "Jazz Festival Jazz" (Duke Ellington, Billy Strayhorn) - 7:06
6. "Mr. Gentle and Mr. Cool" (Harold Shorty Baker, Duke Ellington) - 6:59
7. "Juniflip" (Duke Ellington) - 3:38
8. "Hi Fi Fo Fum" (Duke Ellington) - 5:42

Live tracks

9. "Just Scratchin' the Surface" (Duke Ellington) - 6:24
10. "Happy Reunion" (Duke Ellington) - 3:23
11. "Mr. Gentle and Mr. Cool" (Harold Shorty Baker, Duke Ellington) - 7:08
12. "Jazz Festival Jazz" (Duke Ellington, Billy Strayhorn) - 7:06
13. "Feet Bone" (Duke Ellington)-3:03
14. "Prima Bara Dubla" (Duke Ellington, Billy Strayhorn) - 6:58
