= Jimmy Hamilton =

American jazz clarinetist and saxophonist (1917–1994)

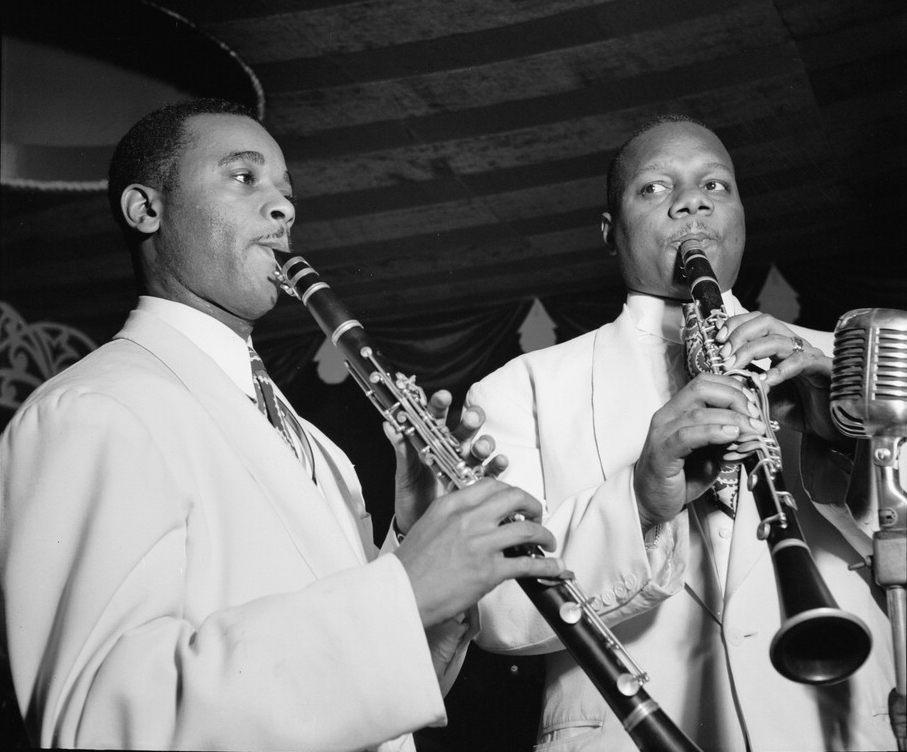
- Jimmy Hamilton and Harry Carney, Aquarium NYC, c. November 1946; Photography by William P. Gottlieb

Background information
- Born: James Hamilton; May 25, 1917; Dillon, South Carolina, United States
- Died: September 20, 1994 (aged 77) St. Croix, Virgin Islands
- Genres: Jazz
- Occupation: Musician
- Instruments: Clarinet, saxophone

Jimmy Hamilton (May 25, 1917 – September 20, 1994) was an American jazz clarinetist and saxophonist, who was a member of the Duke Ellington Orchestra.

== Biography ==
Hamilton was born in Dillon, South Carolina, United States, and grew up in Philadelphia. Having learned to play piano and brass instruments, in the 1930s he started playing the latter in local bands before switching to clarinet and saxophone. During this time he studied with clarinet teacher Leon Russianoff. In 1939, he played with Lucky Millinder, Jimmy Mundy, and Bill Doggett, going on to join the Teddy Wilson sextet in 1940. After two years with Wilson, he played with Eddie Heywood and Yank Porter.

In 1943, he replaced Barney Bigard in the Duke Ellington orchestra and stayed with Ellington until 1968. His style was different on his two instruments: on tenor saxophone he had an R&B sound, while on clarinet he was much more precise and technical. He wrote some of his own material in his time with Ellington.

After he left the Ellington orchestra, Hamilton played and arranged on a freelance basis before spending the 1970s and 1980s in the Virgin Islands teaching music. On his retirement from teaching, he continued to perform with his own groups in 1989 and 1990. Hamilton died on September 20, 1994, in St. Croix, Virgin Islands, at the age of 77.

== Discography ==
=== As leader ===
- Clarinet in High Fi (Urania, 1955)
- Jimmy Hamilton and the New York Jazz Quintet (Urania, 1956)
- Swing Low Sweet Clarinet (Everest, 1960)
- It's About Time (Prestige Swingville, 1961)
- Can't Help Swinging (Prestige Swingville, 1961)
- In a Sentimental Mood (World Record Club, 1963)
- Rediscovered at the Buccaneer (Who's Who in Jazz, 1985)
- S'weet But (Hot Drive, 1997)
- Tribute to Barney Bigard and Russell Procope (Squatty Roo, 2014)

With Clarinet Summit

- In Concert at the Public Theater (India Navigation, 1984)
- Southern Bells (Black Saint, 1987)

=== As sideman ===
With Duke Ellington

- Masterpieces by Ellington (Columbia, 1951)
- Ellington Uptown (Columbia, 1952)
- Live At The Crystal Gardens 1952 (Hep, 2011)
- Ellington '55 (Capitol, 1954)
- Seattle Concert (RCA Victor, 1954)
- Ellington Showcase (Capitol, 1955)
- Historically Speaking (Bethlehem, 1956)
- Duke Ellington Presents... (Bethlehem, 1956)
- Liberian Suite (Columbia, 1956)
- Ellington at Newport (Columbia, 1956)
- A Drum Is a Woman (Columbia, 1957)
- All Star Road Band (Doctor Jazz, 1957 [1983])
- Such Sweet Thunder (Columbia, 1957)
- Black, Brown and Beige (Columbia, 1958)
- Newport 1958 (Columbia, 1958)
- The Cosmic Scene (Columbia, 1958)
- Ellington Indigos (Columbia, 1958)
- Jazz Party (Columbia, 1959)
- Ellington Moods (Sesac, 1959)
- Festival Session (Columbia, 1959)
- Duke Ellington at the Bal Masque (Columbia, 1959)
- Anatomy of a Murder (Columbia, 1959)
- Blues in Orbit (Columbia, 1960)
- First Time! The Count Meets the Duke (Columbia, 1961)
- Paris Blues (United Artists, 1961)
- Midnight in Paris (Columbia, 1962)
- Piano in the Background (Columbia, 1962)
- All American in Jazz (Columbia, 1962)
- Afro-Bossa (Reprise, 1963)
- The Great Paris Concert (Atlantic, 1963 [1973])
- The Symphonic Ellington (Reprise, 1963)
- All Star Road Band Volume 2 (Doctor Jazz, 1964 [1985])
- Ellington '65 (Reprise, 1964)
- Harlem (Pablo, 1964 [1985])
- Duke Ellington Plays Mary Poppins (Reprise, 1964)
- Concert in the Virgin Islands (Reprise 1965)
- The Popular Duke Ellington (RCA Victor, 1966)
- Duke Ellington's Concert of Sacred Music (RCA Victor, 1966)
- Far East Suite (RCA Victor, 1967)
- Soul Call (Verve, 1967)
- Ella and Duke at the Cote D'Azur (Verve, 1967; with Ella Fitzgerald)
- Liederhalle Stuttgart 1967 (SWR, Jazzhaus, 2020)
- And His Mother Called Him Bill (RCA Victor, 1968)
- Second Sacred Concert (Fantasy, 1968)
- Black, Brown and Beige (Columbia, 1958)
- Live At The Opernhaus Cologne 1969 (Delta Music, 2016)
- 70th Birthday Concert {Sol;id State, 1969

With Johnny Hodges

- Used to Be Duke (Norgran, 1954)
- Creamy (Norgran, 1955)
- Ellingtonia '56 (Norgran, 1956)
- The Big Sound (Verve, 1957)
- Duke's in Bed (Verve, 1957)
- Not So Dukish (Verve, 1958)
- The Rabbit (Vogue, 1962)
- Johnny Hodges with Billy Strayhorn and the Orchestra (Verve, 1962)
- Everybody Knows Johnny Hodges (Impulse!, 1964)
- Blue Notes (Verve, 1966)
- Blue Pyramid (Verve, 1966)
- Don't Sleep in the Subway (Verve, 1967)
- Triple Play (RCA Victor, 1967)
- Swing's Our Thing (Verve, 1968)
- Jumpin' with Johnny Hodges (Vogue, 1973)
- Ellingtonia! (Onyx, 1974)

With others

- Ralph Burns, Ralph Burns Among the JATPs (Norgran, 1955)
- Harry Carney, With Strings (Clef, 1955)
- Rosemary Clooney, Blue Rose (Columbia, 1956)
- Ella Fitzgerald & Duke Ellington, Ella at Duke's Place (Verve, 1966)
- Earl Hines, Once Upon a Time (Impulse!, 1966)
- Frank Sinatra & Duke Ellington, Francis A. & Edward K. (Reprise, 1968)
- Lucky Thompson, Intimate Jazz in Hi-Fi, Accent On Tenor Sax (Urania, 1956)
- Ben Webster, Music for Loving (Norgran, 1954)
- Coleman Hawkins, Basically Duke (Bethlehem, 1954)
- Coleman Hawkins, Things Ain't What They Used to Be (Swingville, 1961)
