= Quentin Jackson =

American jazz trombonist (1909–1976)

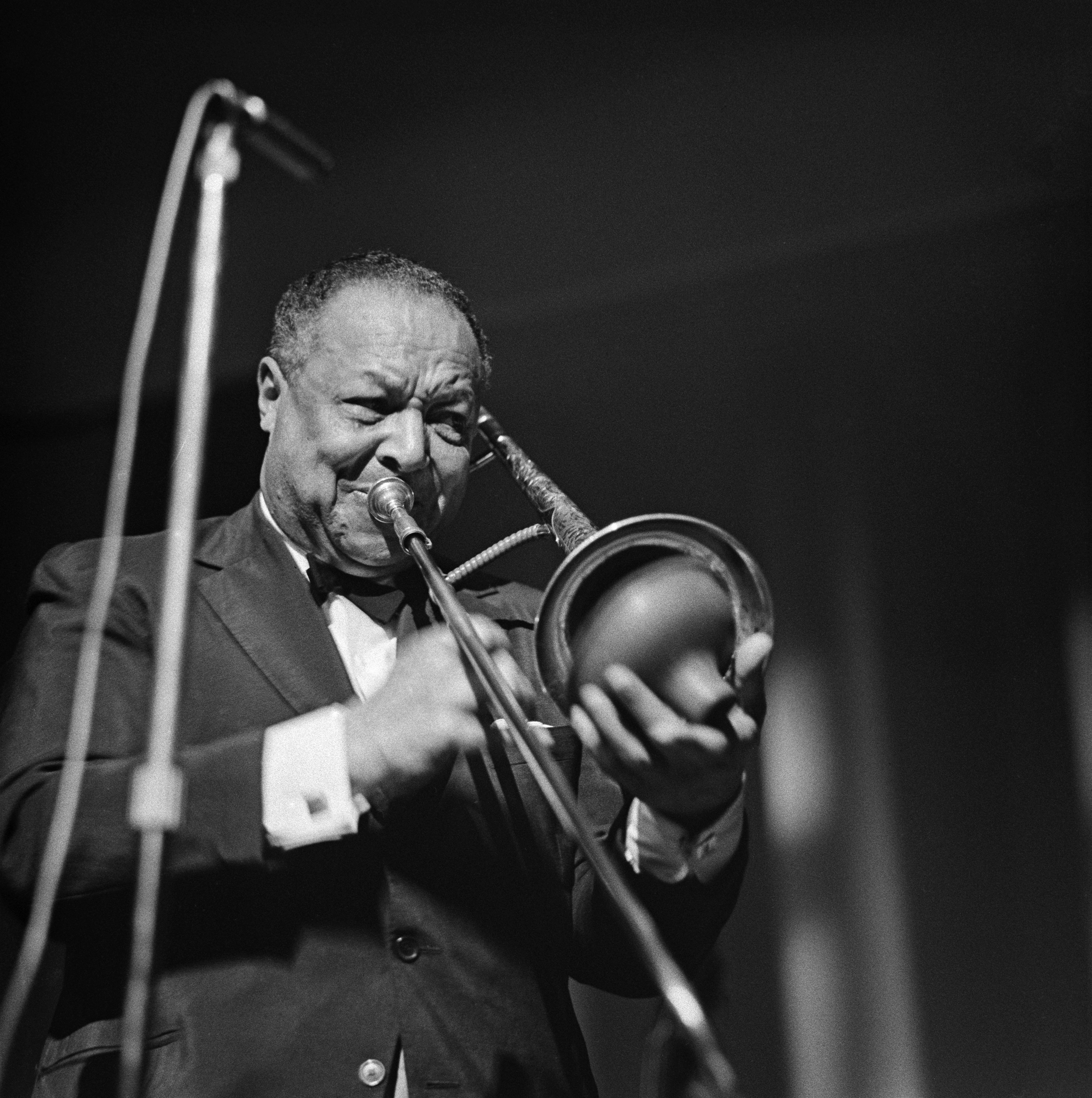
- Quentin Jackson in 1960

Background information
- Also known as: "Butter" Jackson
- Born: January 13, 1909; Springfield, Ohio, U.S.
- Died: October 2, 1976 (aged 67) New York City, U.S.
- Genres: Jazz
- Instruments: Trombone

Quentin "Butter" Jackson (January 13, 1909 – October 2, 1976) was an American jazz trombonist.

== Career ==
In the early stage of his career, Jackson worked with Cab Calloway for eight years. Later, he was a member of the Duke Ellington Orchestra and worked with Charles Mingus, Kenny Burrell, and others.

On her album Dinah Sings Bessie Smith, Dinah Washington recorded a version of Bessie Smith's "Trombone Cholly" with Jackson on the horn, under the revised title, "Trombone Butter".

== Death ==
On the 2nd of October 1976, Quentin Jackson died from a Heart Attack after feeling ill when playing at the Broadway Theatre for the Orchestra called "Guys and Dolls" at 67 years old. He was survived by his wife, the former Jacqueline Taylor and two sisters, Marguerite Leigh and Dorothea Jones.

== Discography ==
With Louis Armstrong

- Louis Armstrong and His Friends (Flying Dutchman/Amsterdam, 1970)

With Dorothy Ashby

- The Fantastic Jazz Harp of Dorothy Ashby (Atlantic, 1965)

With Count Basie

- Basie at Birdland (Roulette, 1961)
- The Legend (Roulette, 1961)
- Back with Basie (Roulette, 1962)
- Basie in Sweden (Roulette, 1962)

With Kenny Burrell

- Blues - The Common Ground (Verve, 1967–68)
- Ellington Is Forever Volume Two (Fantasy, 1975)

With Duke Ellington

- The 1953 Pasadena Concert (GNP Crescendo)
- Ellington '55 (Capitol)
- Ellington at Newport (Columbia 1956)
- All Star Road Band (Doctor Jazz, 1957 [1983])
- Newport 1958 (Columbia 1958)
- Blues in Orbit (Columbia)
- Anatomy of a Murder (Columbia, 1959)

With Ella Fitzgerald

- Ella Fitzgerald Sings the Duke Ellington Songbook (Verve, 1957)

With Johnny Hodges

- Ellingtonia '56 (Norgran, 1956)
- Duke's in Bed (Verve, 1956)
- The Big Sound (Verve, 1957)
- Johnny Hodges with Billy Strayhorn and the Orchestra (Verve, 1961)
- 3 Shades of Blue (Flying Dutchman, 1970)

With Milt Jackson

- For Someone I Love (Riverside, 1963)

With Quincy Jones

- I Dig Dancers (Mercury, 1960)
- Quincy Jones Plays Hip Hits (Mercury, 1963)
- Quincy Jones Explores the Music of Henry Mancini (Mercury, 1964)
- Golden Boy (Mercury, 1964)
- Quincy Plays for Pussycats (Mercury, 1959-65 [1965])

With Herbie Mann

- Latin Mann (Columbia, 1965)
- Our Mann Flute (Atlantic, 1966)

With Freddie McCoy

- Listen Here (Prestige, 1968)

With Charles Mingus

- The Complete Town Hall Concert (Blue Note, 1962 [1994])
- The Black Saint and the Sinner Lady (Impulse!, 1963)
- Mingus Mingus Mingus Mingus Mingus (Impulse!, 1963)
- Epitaph (Columbia, 1989)

With Wes Montgomery

- Movin' Wes (Verve, 1963/1997)

With Shirley Scott

- For Members Only (1963)
- Great Scott!! (1964)
- Roll 'Em: Shirley Scott Plays the Big Bands (Impulse!, 1966)

With Jimmy Smith

- Hoochie Coochie Man (Verve, 1966)
- Peter & The Wolf (Verve, 1966)

With Clark Terry

- Duke with a Difference (Riverside, 1957)

With Dinah Washington

- The Swingin' Miss "D" (1956)
- Blue Gardenia
- Dinah Sings Bessie Smith (1956–57)

With Billy Strayhorn

- Cue for Saxophone (Felsted, 1959)

With Randy Weston

- Uhuru Afrika (Roulette, 1960)
- Highlife (Colpix, 1963)
