= Mercer Ellington =

American musician, composer, and arranger (1919–1996)

- Ellington in concert at the University of Rochester, 1975, photo by Tom Marcello

Background information
- Born: Mercer Kennedy Ellington; March 11, 1919; Washington, D.C., U.S.
- Died: February 8, 1996 (aged 76) Copenhagen, Denmark
- Genres: Jazz; swing; big band
- Occupations: Musician; composer; arranger
- Instrument: Trumpet
- Years active: 1939–1996

Mercer Kennedy Ellington (March 11, 1919 – February 8, 1996) was an American musician, composer, and arranger. His father was Duke Ellington, whose band Mercer led for 20 years after his father's death.

== Biography ==
=== Early life and education ===
Ellington was born in Washington, D.C., United States. He was the only child of the composer, pianist, and bandleader Duke Ellington and his high school sweetheart Edna Thompson (d. 1967), whom Duke married in 1918 and never divorced. Ellington grew up primarily in Harlem from the age of eight. By the age of eighteen, Ellington had written his first piece to be recorded by his father ("Pigeons and Peppers"). Ellington attended New College for the Education of Teachers at Columbia University, New York University and the Juilliard School.

=== Career ===
In 1939, 1959, and 1946 through 1949, Ellington led his own bands, many of whose members later performed with his father, or achieved a successful career in their own right (including Dizzy Gillespie, Kenny Dorham, Idrees Sulieman, Chico Hamilton, Charles Mingus, and Carmen McRae). During the 1940s, in particular, Ellington wrote pieces that became standards, including "Things Ain't What They Used to Be", "Jumpin' Punkins", "Moon Mist", and "Blue Serge". Ellington also wrote the lyrics to Hillis Walters' popular song, "Pass Me By" (1946), which was recorded by Lena Horne, Carmen McRae and Peggy Lee.

Ellington composed for his father from 1940 until 1941, and later worked as road manager for Cootie Williams' orchestra (1941 until 1943 and again in 1954). Ellington returned to work for his father playing alto horn in 1950, and then as general manager and copyist from 1955 until 1959. In 1960, Ellington became Della Reese's musical director, then later went on take a job as a radio DJ in New York for three years beginning in 1962. In 1965, Ellington again returned to his father's orchestra, this time as trumpeter and road manager. When his father died in 1974, Ellington took over the orchestra, traveling on tour to Europe in 1975 and 1977. (His son Edward Ellington played in the band in the late 1970s. His son Paul Mercer Ellington took it over at a later date.) In the early 1980s, Ellington became the first conductor for a Broadway musical of his father's music, Sophisticated Ladies which ran from 1981 until 1983. Mercer's Digital Duke won the 1988 Grammy Award for Best Large Jazz Ensemble Album. From 1982 until early 1990s, the Duke Ellington Orchestra included Barrie Lee Hall, Rocky White, Tommy James, Gregory Charles Royal, J.J. Wiggins, Onzy Matthews, and Shelly Carrol among others.

=== Death and legacy ===
Ellington died of a heart attack on February 8, 1996, at age 76. His daughter Mercedes Ellington is president of the Duke Ellington Center for the Arts. After Ellington died, his son Paul became the executor of both his and the Duke Ellington estate and kept the Duke Ellington Orchestra alive. Ellington's eldest grandson, Edward Kennedy Ellington II, is also a musician and maintains a small salaried band known as the Duke Ellington Legacy, which frequently comprises the core of the big band operated by The Duke Ellington Center for the Arts.

== Personal life ==
His daughter Mercedes was born in 1939 to Ruth Silas Batts. Ellington was married three times. His first marriage was to Evelyn Walker from 1942 until 1976, with whom he had two children: Gayl Ellington and Edward Ellington II. Ellington's second marriage was to singer and actress Della Reese in April 1961. The marriage was later annulled in June of that year after it was determined Ellington's previous Mexican divorce was invalid. His third marriage was to Lene Margrethe Scheid from 1978 until his death in 1996. Together, Ellington and Scheid had one child, Paul Ellington (b. 1979).

== Discography ==
=== As leader ===
- Steppin' into Swing Society (Coral, 1958)
- Colors in Rhythm (Coral, 1959)
- Black and Tan Fantasy (MCA, 1974)
- Continuum (Fantasy, 1975)
- Hot and Bothered (A Re-Creation) (Doctor Jazz, 1985)
- Digital Duke (GRP, 1987)
- Music Is My Mistress (Musicmasters, 1989)
- Take the Holiday Train (Special Music, 1992)
- Marian McPartland's Piano Jazz with Guest Mercer Ellington (Jazz Alliance, 1994)
- Only God Can Make a Tree (Musicmasters, 1996)

=== As arranger ===
With Clark Terry

- Duke with a Difference (Riverside, 1957)
