= Togo Brava Suite =

Live album by Duke Ellington
- Released: 1971
- Recorded: October 22 & 24, 1971
- Venues: Birmingham Theatre, Birmingham, England (tracks 7, 8, 11 & 12); Odeon Theatre, Bristol, England (all other tracks)
- Genres: Jazz; swing; big band
- Length: 66:56
- Labels: United Artists; UXS-92
- Producer: Noel Walker

Duke Ellington chronology
The Intimate Ellington (1969–71)	Togo Brava Suite (1971)	Live at the Whitney (1972)

2001 Storyville release
- 2001 cover, featuring the 1967 Togo commemorative stamp Released: January 20, 2001; Recorded: February 3 – June 29, 1971; Studio: National Recording Studio, New York; Length: 72:33; Label: Storyville (STCD 8323 [CD]); Producer: Anders Stefansen, Bjarne Busk

Togo Brava Suite is an album by the American pianist, composer, and bandleader Duke Ellington. It was recorded in England and released by United Artists Records in 1971. The album won a Grammy Award for Best Jazz Performance by a Big Band in 1972. The album was later reissued on CD by Blue Note in 1994, and studio recordings of the complete Togo Brava Suite were released in 2001 by Storyville.

== History ==
In 1967, the West-African Republic of Togo produced a series of four stamps commemorating great composers as part of celebrations for the twentieth anniversary of UNESCO. Among the four was Duke Ellington, alongside Bach, Beethoven, and Debussy. This honor to Ellington was followed by a ceremony in New York, and wishing to be well-prepared, Ellington spent hours on the telephone asking for research into the country—"everything from its history to its fertility". Soon enough, he was sent a package of notes and other material about Togo by express air-freight.

Several years later, in 1971, Ellington wrote his Togo Brava Suite as a way to thank Togo, which he originally conceived to have seven movements. He soon produced a recording of the suite in New York on June 28 and 29, and he debuted it at the Newport Jazz Festival in July, both that same year, in 1971.

It was thought that only four of the pieces (out of eight) from Ellington's two June sessions belonged to the suite, due to the fact that those four movements were released on record a year later; however, the original, long-unpublished tape included a full seven movements of Togo Brava. These movements consisted of both old and new Ellington compositions: "Mris", retitled "Soul Soothing Beach"; "Tego", known previously as "Limbo Jazz", a piece debuted he on Duke Ellington Meets Coleman Hawkins in 1962; (Note: Ellington would recycle "Limbo Jazz" at least two other times with some variation to the piece. It would be reused in "Island Virgin" as the opening track to the Virgin Islands Suite, which was recorded on April 14, 1965; as "Tego" for The Afro-Eurasian Eclipse, although it would not be included; and finally as part of the Togo Brava Suite in 1971.) "Tugo/Yo-Yo", retitled "Naturellement"; "Too Kee", retitled "Amour, Amour"; "Buss", retitled "Right on Togo"; "SoSo"; and "ToTo", retitled "Afrique", which was later released on The Afro-Eurasian Eclipse in 1975. This complete studio version was issued on CD by Storyville Records in 2001.

The Jazz at Lincoln Center Orchestra performed the Togo Brava Suite as a part of their Duke in Africa tour (January 2026), a part of the larger 2025–2026 season, titled Mother Africa. The tour's music was directed by orchestra members Alexa Tarantino and Chris Lewis and also featured music from Ellington's Liberian Suite (1947) and Afro Bossa (1963).

== Reception ==
Professional ratings
Review scores
Source	Rating
AllMusic	2/5 stars
The Penguin Guide to Jazz Recordings	3/4 stars

The AllMusic review by Scott Yanow stated, "By the time of these concerts from England, the Duke Ellington Orchestra had suffered quite a few losses of veteran personnel ... However, the band was still a major force, and this set has plenty of highpoints".

JazzTimes's Harvey Siders wrote, "it's filled with many moments-indeed whole tracks-that bear few ethnomusicological ties to Togo. But that is of little consequence," adding that the tracks "represent Duke at his most uneven: moments of divine inspiration contrasted with frustrating mediocrity. The one constancy, which probably explains those parameters: experimentation. He never stopped reinventing his orchestra, always searching for new colors, new voicings-to put old wine in new bottles."

Of the 2001 release, PopMatters noted that it "sees Ellington in good expressive mode and Turney's flute adds to the charm" and that "There is a filmic quality of which Ellington, ever the impressionist, was an absolute master, but also a slight heavy-handedness about the arrangements – possibly too brash for modern ears."

== Track listing ==
All compositions are by Duke Ellington except where noted.

1971 live release
No.	Title	Writer(s)	Length
1.	"C Jam Blues"	Duke Ellington; Barney Bigard	4:42
2.	"Toga Brava Suite: Soul Soothing Beach/Naturellement"		11:56
3.	"Right on Togo"		4:58
4.	"Happy Reunion"		4:41
5.	"Addi"		4:04
6.	"Lotus Blossom"	Billy Strayhorn	2:30
7.	"Cotton Tail"		4:18
8.	"Checkered Hat"	Judy Spencer; Norris Turney	4:37
9.	"La Plus Belle Africaine"		8:39
10.	"In a Mellow Tone"	Ellington; Milt Gabler	4:02
11.	"I Got It Bad (and That Ain't Good)"	Ellington; Paul Francis Webster	5:29
12.	"Melancholia"		3:41
13.	"Soul Flute"		3:19
Total length:			66:56

- Tracks 7, 8, 11, and 12 were recorded live at the Birmingham Theatre in Birmingham, England, on October 24, 1971. All other tracks were recorded at Odeon Theatre in Bristol, England, on October 22, 1971.

2001 studio release
No.	Title	Writer(s)	Length
1.	"Mkis" ("Soul Soothing Beach")		3:34
2.	"Tego" ("Limbo Jazz")		7:41
3.	"Togo/Yo-Yo" ("Naturellement")		5:46
4.	"Too Kee" ("Amour, Amour")		2:14
5.	"Buss" ("Right on Togo")		2:59
6.	"Soso"		3:48
7.	"Toto" ("Afrique")		3:02
8.	"Peke"		4:01
9.	"Checkered Hat"	Judy Spencer; Norris Turney	4:18
10.	"There's a Place"		4:45
11.	"Blues"		3:30
12.	"Hick"		7:52
13.	"Grap (The Giggling Rapids)"		3:15
14.	"Something"		5:24
15.	"Making That Scene (Love Scene)"		1:55
16.	"Lover Man"	Jimmy Davis; Roger "Ram" Ramirez; James Sherman	4:20
17.	"Perdido"	Juan Tizol; Ervin Drake; Hans Lengsfelder	3:58
Total length:			72:33

- Recorded at National Recording Studio, New York, NY, between February 3 – June 29, 1971: track 8, February 3; tracks 9–11, February 23; tracks 12–15, April 28; tracks 16 & 17, May 13; tracks 1–3, June 28; tracks 4–7, June 29

== Personnel ==
=== 1971 live release ===
Musicians

- Duke Ellington – piano
- Norris Turney – alto saxophone, flute
- Harold Minerve, Russell Procope – alto saxophone, clarinet
- Paul Gonsalves – tenor saxophone
- Jimmy Hamilton, Harold Ashby – tenor saxophone, clarinet
- Harry Carney – baritone saxophone
- Johnny Coles, Mercer Ellington, Money Johnson, Cootie Williams, Eddie Preston – trumpet
- Malcolm Taylor, Booty Wood – trombone
- Chuck Connors – bass trombone
- Wild Bill Davis – organ
- Joe Benjamin – double bass
- Rufus "Speedy" Jones – drums

Technical

- Noel Walker – producer
- Stanley Dance – liner notes

=== 2001 studio release ===
Musicians

- Duke Ellington – piano (1–14, 16, 17)
- Nell Brookshire, Tony Watkins – vocals
- Norris Turney (1–10, 12–17), Harold Minerve (1–7, 12–17) – alto saxophone, flute
- Buddy Pearson – alto saxophone (1–7, 16, 17)
- Russell Procope – alto saxophone, clarinet; (1–10)
- Paul Gonsalves – tenor saxophone (1–10, 12–17)
- Harold Ashby – tenor saxophone, piccolo; (1–10, 12–17)
- Harry Carney – baritone saxophone, clarinet, bass clarinet; (1–10, 12–17)
- Mercer Ellington (1–10, 12–17), Money Johnson (1–10, 12–17), Cootie Williams (1–10, 12–17), Eddie Preston (8–10, 12–17), Richard Williams (1–7) – trumpet
- Malcolm Taylor (1–10, 12–17), Booty Wood (1–10, 12–17) – trombone
- Chuck Connors – bass trombone (1–10, 12–17)
- Wild Bill Davis – organ (1–11, 15–17)
- Joe Benjamin – double bass
- Rufus Jones – drums

Technical

- Anders Stefansen – CD release producer, digital producer
- Bjarne Busk – CD release producer, liner notes
- Chrisna Morten – layout
- Bengt H. Malmqvist – photography
