= It Don't Mean a Thing If It Ain't Got That Swing (album) =

It Don't Mean a Thing If It Ain't Got that Swing

Studio album by Duke Ellington & Teresa Brewer
- Released: 1973
- Recorded: September 4, 5, & 6, 1973
- Genre: Jazz
- Label: Flying Dutchman
- Producer: Bob Thiele

Teresa Brewer chronology
The Songs of Bessie Smith (1973)	It Don't Mean a Thing If It Ain't Got that Swing (1973)	Music, Music, Music (1973)

Duke Ellington chronology
Duke's Big 4 (1973)	It Don't Mean a Thing If It Ain't Got That Swing (1973)	Third Sacred Concert (1973)

It Don't Mean a Thing If It Ain't Got That Swing is a studio album by American pianist, composer and bandleader Duke Ellington and singer Teresa Brewer originally released on Bob Thiele's Flying Dutchman label in 1973. It features the final studio recordings by Ellington.

== Reception ==
The Allmusic review awarded the album 4½ stars.

Professional ratings
Review scores
Source	Rating
Allmusic	4.5/5 stars

== Track listing ==
All compositions by Duke Ellington and lyrics by Don George except as indicated

1. "It Don't Mean a Thing (If It Ain't Got That Swing)" (Ellington, Irving Mills)
2. "I Ain't Got Nothin' But the Blues"
3. "Satin Doll" (Ellington, Billy Strayhorn, Johnny Mercer)
4. "Mood Indigo' (Barney Bigard, Ellington, Mills)
5. "Don't Get Around Much Anymore" (Ellington, Bob Russell)
6. "I'm Beginning to See the Light" (Ellington, George, Johnny Hodges, Harry James)
7. "I've Got to Be a Rug Cutter"
8. "I Got It Bad (And That Ain't Good)" (Ellington, Paul Francis Webster)
9. "Tulip or Turnip (Tell Me, Tell Me, Dream Face)"
10. "It's Kind of Lonesome Out Tonight"
11. "Poco Mucho"

- Recorded in New York on September 4 (tracks 3, 5, 8 & 10), September 5 (tracks 1, 2, 6 & 7), and September 6 (tracks 4, 9 & 11), 1973.

== Personnel ==
- Duke Ellington – piano
- Teresa Brewer – vocals
- Ray Nance – cornet (tracks 1–3, 5–8 & 10)
- Johnny Coles (tracks 1–3, 5–8 & 10), Mercer Ellington (tracks 1 & 7), Tyree Glenn (tracks 1, 2, 4, 6, 7 & 11), Barrie Lee Hall (tracks 1–3, 5–8 & 10), Money Johnson (tracks 1–3, 5–8 & 10), Joe Newman (tracks 1 & 7), Jimmy Nottingham (tracks 1 & 7), Jimmy Owens (tracks 1 & 7), Ernie Royal, (tracks 1 & 7) – trumpet
- Art Baron (tracks 1–3, 5–8 & 10), Vince Prudente – trombone
- Chuck Connors – bass trombone (tracks 1–3, 5–8 & 10)
- Harold Minerve – alto saxophone, flute (tracks 1–3, 5–8 & 10)
- Russell Procope – alto saxophone (tracks 1–8, 10 & 11)
- Harold Ashby – clarinet, tenor saxophone (tracks 1–3, 5–8 & 10)
- Norris Turney – tenor saxophone (tracks 1–3, 5–8 & 10)
- Harry Carney – baritone saxophone, clarinet, bass clarinet (tracks 1–8, 10 & 11)
- Joe Beck – guitar (tracks 4, 9 & 11)
- Joe Benjamin – bass (tracks 1–3, 5–8 & 10)
- Herb Bushler – electric bass (tracks 4, 9 & 11)
- Quentin White (tracks 1–3, 5–8 & 10), Pretty Purdie (tracks 4, 9 & 11) – drums
- Bunny Briggs – vocals (tracks 1, 7 & 9)
- James Mtume – conga (track 11)
