= Up in Duke's Workshop =

1976 album by Duke Ellington

Studio album by Duke Ellington
- Released: 1976
- Recorded: April 25 & June 20, 1969; June 15 & December 9, 1970; February 1 & 3 and June 29, 1971; December 6, 1972
- Genre: Jazz
- Label: Pablo
- Producer: Norman Granz

Duke Ellington chronology
This One's for Blanton! (1972)	Up in Duke's Workshop (1976)	Duke's Big 4 (1973)

Up in Duke's Workshop is an album by the American pianist, composer and bandleader Duke Ellington that collects sessions recorded in 1969, 1970, 1971 and 1972, released on the Pablo label in 1979.

== Reception ==
The AllMusic review by Scott Yanow states: "This LP is primarily for Duke Ellington completists and scholars. Some of the performances are runthroughs of works that would soon be discarded or rewritten while others are true obscurities... nothing all that essential or historic occurs and there are over 100 currently available Duke Ellington recordings that one would recommend first."

Professional ratings
Review scores
Source	Rating
AllMusic	2/5 stars
The Penguin Guide to Jazz Recordings	3.5/4 stars
The Rolling Stone Jazz Record Guide	3/5 stars

== Track listing ==
All compositions by Duke Ellington except as indicated

1. "Blem" – 6:55
2. "Goof" – 3:14
3. "Dick" – 2:57
4. "Love Is Just Around the Corner" (Lewis Gensler, Leo Robin) – 4:23
5. "Bateau" – 5:23
6. "Wanderlust" (Ellington, Johnny Hodges) – 6:26
7. "Neo-Creole" – 3:52
8. "Black Butterfly" (Ellington, Irving Mills) – 3:40
9. "Mendoza" – 5:43

- Recorded at National Recording Studio in New York on April 25, 1969 (track 1), 23 May 1969 (track 2), June 20, 1969 (track 3), June 15, 1970 (track 4), December 9, 1970 (track 5), February 1, 1971 (track 6), February 3, 1971 (track 7), June 29, 1971 (track 8), December 6, 1972 (track 9).

== Personnel ==
- Duke Ellington – piano
- Wild Bill Davis – organ (track 4–7)
- Cat Anderson (tracks 2, 4–8), Johnny Coles (track 9), Willie Cook (tracks 1–8), Mercer Ellington (tracks 3, 4, 6–9), Money Johnson (tracks 3, 5 & 9), Jimmy Owens (track 2), Eddie Preston (track 6), Al Rubin (track 5), Fred Stone (track 4), Cootie Williams – trumpet
- Lawrence Brown (track 2), Buster Cooper (track 2), Tyree Glenn, (track 9), Benny Green (tracks 1 & 3), Benny Powell (track 1), Julian Priester (tracks 4–8), Vince Prudente (track 9), Malcolm Taylor (track 5), Booty Wood (track 4–8) – trombone
- Chuck Connors (tracks 2 & 4–9) – bass trombone
- Russell Procope – clarinet, alto saxophone
- Harold Minerve – flute, alto
- Johnny Hodges (tracks 2 & 3), Buddy Pearson (track 8), Norris Turney (tracks 2–5) – alto saxophone
- Paul Gonsalves, Harold Ashby – tenor saxophone
- Harry Carney – baritone saxophone
- Joe Benjamin (track 4–8), Victor Gaskin (tracks 2 & 3), Paul Kondziela (tracks 1–3) – bass
- Rufus Jones – drums
