= Sacred Concert (Ellington) =

Performances of religious music by Duke Ellington

Sacred Concert by Duke Ellington is one of the following realizations:

- 1965 – Concert of Sacred Music
- 1968 – Second Sacred Concert
- 1973 – Third Sacred Concert

Ellington called these concerts "the most important thing I have ever done". He said many times that he was not trying to compose a Mass. The critic Gary Giddins has characterized these concerts as Ellington bringing the Cotton Club revue to the church.

== Concert of Sacred Music ==
Concert of Sacred Music

Live album by Duke Ellington
- Released: 1966
- Recorded: December 26, 1965
- Genre: Jazz
- Label: RCA

Duke Ellington chronology
Ella at Duke's Place (1965)	Concert of Sacred Music (1966)	The Stockholm Concert, 1966 (1966)

Grace Cathedral in San Francisco planned a "Festival of Grace", with a variety of cultural works and speakers, to occur during the first year the cathedral was open, and Ellington's concert was to be a part of it. (The "festival" also included a performance by Vince Guaraldi.)

The concert premiered on September 16, 1965, and was recorded by KQED, a local public television station. The performance was released on CD as A Concert of Sacred Music Live from Grace Cathedral and on DVD as Love You Madly/A Concert of Sacred Music at Grace Cathedral. The official album on RCA, A Concert of Sacred Music, was recorded at two concerts at Fifth Avenue Presbyterian Church in New York on December 26, 1965. Additional material from these concerts, not found on the original album, can be found on the 24-CD box set The Duke Ellington Centennial Edition: The Complete RCA Victor Recordings (1927–1973). The concert mixed existing and new material, with "New World A-Comin'" and "Come Sunday" from the 1943 jazz suite Black, Brown and Beige and "Heritage (My Mother, My Father)" from the 1963 stage show My People (released in 1965 on the album My People). A new piece, the song "In the Beginning God", was awarded a Grammy Award in 1967. It was performed again at Grace Cathedral on its 25th and 50th anniversaries, in 1990 and 2015.

=== Reception ===
The AllMusic review by Richard S. Ginell stated: "The concert taps into Ellington's roots in showbiz and African-American culture as well as his evidently deep religious faith, throwing it all together in the spirit of universality and sealing everything with the stamps of his musical signatures".

Ebony called the piece "historic", situating it as part of a larger movement in the mid-'60s that brought together jazz and religion.

Professional ratings
Review scores
Source	Rating
AllMusic	5/5 stars
The Penguin Guide to Jazz	3/4 stars

=== Track listing ===
All compositions by Duke Ellington

1. "In the Beginning God" – 19:36
2. "Will You Be There?" – 1:23
3. "Ninety Nine Percent" – 2:23
4. "Ain't but the One" – 3:31
5. "New World A-Coming" – 9:56
6. "In the Beginning, God II" – 4:31
7. "Heritage" – 3:42
8. "The Lord's Prayer" – 3:16
9. "Come Sunday" – 5:30
10. "David Danced Before the Lord with All His Might" – 9:00
11. "The Lord's Prayer II" – 4:56
- Recorded at the Fifth Avenue Presbyterian Church on December 26, 1965.

=== Personnel ===
- Duke Ellington – piano
- Cat Anderson, Mercer Ellington, Herb Jones, Cootie Williams – trumpet
- Lawrence Brown, Buster Cooper, Quentin Jackson – trombone
- Chuck Connors – bass trombone
- Russell Procope, Jimmy Hamilton – alto saxophone, clarinet
- Johnny Hodges – alto saxophone
- Paul Gonsalves – tenor saxophone
- Harry Carney – baritone saxophone
- John Lamb – bass
- Louie Bellson – drums
- Brock Peters, Queen Esther Marrow, Jimmy McPhail – vocals
- The Herman McCoy Choir – choir
- Bunny Briggs – tap dancing (track 10)

== Second Sacred Concert ==
Second Sacred Concert

Studio album by Duke Ellington
- Released: 1968
- Recorded: January 22 & February 19, 1968
- Genre: Jazz
- Label: Prestige

Duke Ellington chronology
Yale Concert (1968)	Second Sacred Concert (1968)	Studio Sessions New York, 1968 (1968)

Ellington's Second Sacred Concert premiered at the Cathedral of St. John the Divine in New York on January 19, 1968, but no recording of this performance has surfaced. The Second Sacred Concert was then recorded on January 22 and February 19, 1968, at Fine Studio in New York and originally issued as a double LP on Prestige Records and reissued on one CD minus the tracks "Don't Get Down On Your Knees To Pray Until You Have Forgiven Everyone" and "Father Forgive". All the tracks can be found in the 24-CD box set The Duke Ellington Centennial Edition: The Complete RCA Victor Recordings (1927-1973).

This concert is the first time Swedish singer Alice Babs recorded with the Ellington Orchestra. In the concert she sang "Heaven", "Almighty God", the wordless vocal "T.G.T.T. (Too Good to Title)", and "Praise God and Dance". Cootie Williams has a "growl" trumpet feature on "The Shepherd (Who Watches Over the Night Flock)". This piece is dedicated to Rev. John Garcia Gensel, Lutheran pastor to the jazz community. The climactic ending is "Praise God and Dance", which comes from Psalm 150.

At the invitation of the Harvard Episcopal Chaplaincy, Ellington gave the concert again at Emmanuel Episcopal Church, Boston, on April 20, 1969.

=== Reception ===
The AllMusic review by Richard S. Ginell stated that "the material is fresh, not a patchwork of old and new like the first concert — and in an attempt to be as ecumenical as possible, Ellington reaches for novel techniques and sounds beyond his usual big band spectrum".

Professional ratings
Review scores
Source	Rating
AllMusic	4/5 stars
The Penguin Guide to Jazz	3/4 stars

=== Track listing ===
All compositions by Duke Ellington

1. "Praise God" – 3:09
2. "Supreme Being" – 11:45
3. "Heaven" – 4:55
4. "Something About Believing" – 8:12
5. "Almighty God" – 6:32
6. "The Shepherd (Who Watches over the Flock)" – 7:10
7. "It's Freedom" – 13:00
8. "Meditation" – 3:10
9. "The Biggest and Busiest Intersection" – 3:57
10. "T.G.T.T. (Too Good to Title)" – 2:25
11. "Don't Get Down on Your Knees to Pray Until You Have Forgiven Everyone" – 5:13 Omitted from CD reissue
12. "Father Forgive" – 2:49 Omitted from CD reissue
13. "Praise God and Dance" – 10:49
  - Recorded at Fine Studio in New York on January 22 (tracks 3, 5, 7, 10 & 13) and February 19 (tracks 1, 2, 4, 6, 8, 9, 11 & 12), 1968.

=== Personnel ===
- Duke Ellington – piano, narration
- Cat Anderson, Mercer Ellington, Money Johnson, Herb Jones, Cootie Williams – trumpet
- Lawrence Brown, Buster Cooper, Bennie Green – trombone
- Chuck Connors – bass trombone
- Russell Procope – alto saxophone, clarinet
- Johnny Hodges – alto saxophone
- Jimmy Hamilton – clarinet, tenor saxophone
- Paul Gonsalves – tenor saxophone
- Harry Carney – baritone saxophone
- Jeff Castleman – bass
- Sam Woodyard, Steve Little – drums
- Alice Babs, Devonne Gardner, Trish Turner, Roscoe Gill – vocals
- The AME Mother Zion Church Choir, Choirs Of St Hilda's and St. Hugh's School, Central Connecticut State College Singers, The Frank Parker Singers – choirs

== Third Sacred Concert ==
Third Sacred Concert

Live album by Duke Ellington
- Released: 1975
- Recorded: 24 October 1973
- Genre: Jazz
- Label: RCA

Duke Ellington chronology
It Don't Mean a Thing If It Ain't Got That Swing (1973)	Third Sacred Concert (1975)	Eastbourne Performance (1973)

The Third Sacred Concert was built around the skills of Alice Babs, Harry Carney, and Ellington himself on the piano. It was premiered at Westminster Abbey in London, United Kingdom on October 24, 1973, and released on LP in 1975 but has only been issued on CD as part of the 24-disc The Duke Ellington Centennial Edition: The Complete RCA Victor Recordings (1927-1973) collection.

At this point in his life, Ellington knew he was dying. Author Janna Tull Steed has written that of all the concerts that Ellington is addressing God facing his mortality. Alice Babs sings "Is God a Three Letter Word for Love?" and "My Love". Tenor saxophonist Harold Ashby is featured on "The Brotherhood", which is a tribute to The United Nations.

=== Reception ===
The AllMusic review by Richard S. Ginell stated that "the weakest of the sacred concerts. It lacks the showbiz kick and exuberance of the first concert and even more eclectic impulses of the second, now burdened with a subdued solemnity and the sense that the ailing Ellington knew his time was drawing to a close (he would be dead exactly six months later)".

Professional ratings
Review scores
Source	Rating
AllMusic	3/5 stars

=== Track listing ===
All compositions by Duke Ellington

1. "Introduction by Sir Colin Crowe" – 1:28
2. "Duke Ellington's Introduction" – 1:26
3. "The Lord's Prayer: My Love" – 7:49
4. "Is God a Three-Letter Word for Love? (Part I)" – 4:27
5. "Is God a Three-Letter Word for Love? (Part II)" – 3:46
6. "The Brotherhood" – 5:46
7. "Hallelujah" – 3:32
8. "Every Man Prays in His Own Language" – 11:10
9. "Ain't Nobody Nowhere Nothin' Without God" – 4:20
10. "The Majesty of God" – 7:27
  - Recorded at Westminster Abbey, London, on October 24, 1973.

=== Personnel ===
- Duke Ellington – piano, narration
- Johnny Coles, Mercer Ellington, Barrie Lee Hall, Money Johnson – trumpet
- Art Baron, Vince Prudente – trombone
- Chuck Connors – bass trombone
- Harold Minerve – alto saxophone, flute
- Russell Procope – alto saxophone
- Harold Ashby – clarinet, tenor saxophone
- Percy Marion – tenor saxophone
- Harry Carney – baritone saxophone, clarinet, bass clarinet
- Joe Benjamin – bass
- Quentin Whit – drums
- Alice Babs, Tony Watkins – vocals
- John Alldis Choir – choir
