= The Ellington Suites =

Studio album by Duke Ellington
- Released: 1976
- Recorded: February 25, 1959, April 1, 1959, April 14, 1959, April 27, 1971 & October 5, 1972
- Genre: Jazz
- Label: Pablo
- Producer: Norman Granz

Duke Ellington chronology
Live at the Whitney (1972)	The Ellington Suites (1976)	This One's for Blanton! (1972)

The Ellington Suites is an album by the American jazz pianist, composer, and bandleader Duke Ellington. It collects three suites recorded in 1959, 1971, and 1972, and was released on the Pablo label in 1976. The album won a Grammy Award for Best Jazz Performance by a Big Band in 1976. Ellington and Billy Strayhorn wrote The Queen's Suite for Queen Elizabeth II, who was presented with a single pressing of the recording, which was not commercially issued during Ellington's lifetime.

== Reception ==
Professional ratings
Review scores
Source	Rating
AllMusic	3/5 stars
The Penguin Guide to Jazz Recordings	3/4 stars
The Rolling Stone Jazz Record Guide	4/5 stars

The AllMusic review by Scott Yanow states, "Although there are some good moments from Ellington's orchestras of 1959 and 1971–72, few of the themes (outside of 'The Single Petal of a Rose' from 'The Queen's Suite') are all that memorable. But even lesser Ellington is of great interest and veteran collectors may want to pick this up".

== Track listing ==
All compositions by Duke Ellington except where noted.

1. "The Queen's Suite: Sunset and the Mocking Bird" (Duke Ellington, Billy Strayhorn) – 3:50
2. "The Queen's Suite: Lightning Bugs and Frogs" (Strayhorn) – 2:52
3. "The Queen's Suite: Le Sucrier Velours" (Duke Ellington, Billy Strayhorn) – 2:46
4. "The Queen's Suite: Northern Lights" (Strayhorn) – 3:37
5. "The Queen's Suite: The Single Petal of a Rose" (Duke Ellington, Billy Strayhorn) – 4:08
6. "The Queen's Suite: Apes and Peacocks" (Duke Ellington, Billy Strayhorn) – 3:05
7. "The Goutelas Suite: Fanfare" – 0:31
8. "The Goutelas Suite: Goutelas" – 1:12
9. "The Goutelas Suite: Get-With-Itness" – 1:55
10. "The Goutelas Suite: Something" – 5:22
11. "The Goutelas Suite: Having at It" – 3:35
12. "The Goutelas Suite: Fanfare" – 0:34
13. "The Uwis Suite: Uwis" – 7:51
14. "The Uwis Suite: Klop" – 2:00
15. "The Uwis Suite: Loco Madi" – 5:52
- Recorded February 25, 1959 (2–4), April 1, 1959 (1 & 6), April 14, 1959 (5), April 27, 1971 (7–12), and October 5, 1972 (13–15)

== Personnel ==
- Duke Ellington – piano
- Russell Procope – alto saxophone, clarinet (tracks 1–4, 6, 13–15)
- Harry Carney – baritone saxophone (tracks 1–4, 6–15)
- Cat Anderson, Shorty Baker, Ray Nance, Clark Terry – trumpet (tracks 1–4, 6)
- Quentin Jackson, Britt Woodman – trombone (tracks 1–4, 6)
- John Sanders – valve trombone (tracks 1–4, 6)
- Jimmy Hamilton – clarinet, tenor saxophone (tracks 1–4, 6)
- Johnny Hodges – alto saxophone (tracks 1–4, 6)
- Paul Gonsalves – tenor saxophone (tracks (tracks 1–4, 6–12)
- Jimmy Woode – double bass (tracks 1–6)
- Jimmy Johnson – drums (tracks 1–4, 6)
- Mercer Ellington, Money Johnson, Cootie Williams – trumpet (tracks 7–15)
- Eddie Preston – trumpet (tracks 7–12)
- Johnny Coles – trumpet (tracks 13–15)
- Booty Wood – trombone (tracks 7–15)
- Malcolm Taylor – trombone (tracks 7–12)
- Chuck Connors – bass trombone (tracks 7–12)
- Norris Turney – alto saxophone (tracks 7–15), flute (track 10)
- Harold Minerve – alto saxophone, clarinet (tracks 7–12)
- Harold Ashby – tenor saxophone, clarinet (tracks 7–15)
- Joe Benjamin – bass (tracks 7–15)
- Rufus Jones – drums (tracks 7–15)
- Vince Prudente – trombone (tracks 13–15)
- Russ Andrews – tenor saxophone (tracks 13–15)
- Wulf Freedman – bass guitar (track 15)
