= The Suites, New York 1968 & 1970 =

Compilation album by Duke Ellington
- Released: 1988
- Recorded: November 6, 1968 – June 15, 1970
- Genre: Jazz, swing
- Length: 27:24
- Label: Saja
- Producer: Duke Ellington

Duke Ellington chronology
Orchestral Works (1970)	The Suites, New York 1968 & 1970 (1988)	The Intimacy of the Blues (1968–70)

The Suites, New York 1968 & 1970 is volume five of The Private Collection, a series of compilation albums by Duke Ellington from his archive of unreleased music, released on the Saja label in 1988. The album includes "The Degas Suite", an unreleased soundtrack for an unfinished film consisting of paintings of horse races.

Also included is "The River", which was composed to accompany a ballet by Alvin Ailey that premiered on June 25, 1970, at New York State Theater in Lincoln Center.

== Reception ==
The AllMusic review by Scott Yanow stated: "Ellington is mostly the lead voice but his star sidemen are heard from on these formerly very rare and somewhat unusual performances. Clearly his genius was strong enough to fill three lifetimes full of new music and this CD contains some melodies that might have been more significant if he had lived long enough to find a place for them."

Professional ratings
Review scores
Source	Rating
AllMusic	4/5 stars

== Track listing ==
All tracks are written by Duke Ellington.

No.	Title	Length
1.	"The Degas Suite: Introduction-Opening Titles/Race/Racing/Piano Pastel/Improvisation - Marcia Regina/Piano Pastel/Daily Double/Drawings/Promenade/Sonnet/Race"	27:24
2.	"The River: The Spring/The Run/The Meander/The Giggling Rapids/The Lake/The Falls/The Whirlpool/The River/The Neo-Hip-Hot Kiddies Communities/The Village of the Virgins/Her Majesty the Sea/The Spring"	47:40

- Recorded at National Recording Studio, New York on November 6, 1968 (tracks 1.1–1.11), November 23, 1968 (track 1.1), December 3, 1968 (track 1.7), at Universal Studios, Chicago on May 25, 1970 (tracks 2.1–2.5 & 2.12), at National Recording Studio, New York on June 3, 1970 (tracks 2.7–2.10), June 8, 1970 (track 2.6) and June 15, 1970 (track 2.11).

== Personnel ==
- Duke Ellington – piano
- Cat Anderson – trumpet
- Dave Burns – trumpet
- Willie Cook – trumpet
- Mercer Ellington – trumpet
- Money Johnson – trumpet
- Frank Stone – trumpet
- Cootie Williams – trumpet
- Lawrence Brown – trombone
- Buster Cooper – trombone
- Cliff Heathers – trombone
- Chuck Connors – bass trombone
- Johnny Hodges – alto saxophone
- Russell Procope – alto saxophone, clarinet
- Norris Turney – alto saxophone, flute
- Harold Ashby – tenor saxophone
- Paul Gonsalves – tenor saxophone
- Harry Carney – baritone saxophone
- Jeff Castleman – double bass
- Joe Benjamin – drums
- Rufus "Speedy" Jones – drums
- Elayne Jones – timpani
- Walter Rosenberg – glockenspiel
- Dave Fitz – xylophone, marimba
