= Studio Sessions New York & Chicago, 1965, 1966 & 1971 =

1987 album by Duke Ellington

Studio album by Duke Ellington
- Released: 1987
- Recorded: March 4 & 31, 1965; May 18, 1965; August 18, 1966; May 5, 1971
- Genre: Jazz
- Length: 63:05
- Label: LMR
- Producer: Duke Ellington

Duke Ellington chronology
| The Afro-Eurasian Eclipse (1971) | Studio Sessions New York & Chicago, 1965, 1966 & 1971 (1987) | The Intimate Ellington (1969-71) |

Studio Sessions New York & Chicago, 1965, 1966 & 1971 is the tenth volume of The Private Collection—a series documenting recordings made by American pianist, composer, and bandleader Duke Ellington for his personal collection which was first released on the LMR label in 1987 and later on the Saja label.

== Reception ==
The AllMusic review by Stewart Mason awarded the album 4 stars stating that the album features "dazzling rhythmic shifts highlighting the orchestra's uncanny musical synchronicity".

Professional ratings
Review scores
| Source | Rating |
|---|---|
| AllMusic | 4/5 stars |

== Track listing ==
All compositions by Duke Ellington

1. "Black" – 8:09
2. "Come Sunday" – 5:59
3. "Light" – 6:29
4. "West Indian Dance" – 2:15
5. "Emancipation Celebration" – 2:36
6. "The Blues" – 5:23
7. "Cy Runs Rock Waltz" – 2:18
8. "Beige" – 2:24
9. "Sugar Hill Penthouse" – 4:55
10. "Harlem" – 13:42
11. "Ad Lib on Nippon" – 11:40

- Recorded at Fine Studios, New York, on March 4, 1965 (tracks 1–3 & 11), at Universal Studios, Chicago, on March 31, 1965 (tracks 4 & 5), and May 18, 1965 (tracks 7–9), at RCA Studio A on August 18, 1966 (track 10), and at National Recording Studio, New York, on May 5, 1971 (track 6).

== Personnel ==
- Duke Ellington – piano
- Ray Nance – cornet (tracks 1–5 & 7–11)
- Cat Anderson (tracks 1–5 & 7–11), Mercer Ellington (track 6), Money Johnson (track 6), Herb Jones (tracks 1–5 & 7–11), Eddie Preston (track 6), Cootie Williams – trumpet
- Lawrence Brown (tracks 1–5 & 7–11), Buster Cooper (tracks 1–5 & 7–11), Malcolm Taylor (track 6), Booty Wood (track 6) – trombone
- Chuck Connors – bass trombone
- Jimmy Hamilton – clarinet, tenor saxophone (tracks 1–5 & 7–11)
- Russell Procope – alto saxophone, clarinet (tracks 1–5 & 7–11)
- Johnny Hodges (tracks 1–5 & 7–11), Buddy Pearson (track 6), Norris Turney (track 6) – alto saxophone
- Paul Gonsalves – tenor saxophone
- Harry Carney – baritone saxophone
- John Lamb (track 1–5 & 7–11), Joe Benjamin (track 6) – bass
- Rufus Jones (track 6), Sam Woodyard (tracks 1–5 & 7–11) – drums
