= Eastbourne Performance =

Live album by Duke Ellington
- Released: 1975
- Recorded: December 1, 1973
- Genre: Jazz
- Label: RCA

Duke Ellington chronology
Third Sacred Concert (1973)	Eastbourne Performance (1975)

Eastbourne Performance is a live album by the American pianist, composer and band leader Duke Ellington, featuring his concerts at the Congress Theatre in Eastbourne, England, in December 1973. It was released on the RCA label in 1975. It is his last concert to have been commercially released.

== Reception ==
The AllMusic review by Scott Yanow states: "The Ellington Orchestra was a bit weaker than it had been (many of the veterans had either died or retired) but it was still a mighty outfit... Actually the most impressive soloist on the album ... is Ellington himself... A fitting ending to a truly remarkable career". The compilers of The Penguin Guide to Jazz Recordings commented: "The Eastbourne set is not quite as bad as its reputation. There are dreadful moments for Moore and Watkins, and some of the features seem redundant... But a final 'Creole Love Call' retains its elegance, and Ellington himself ... sounds very good on 'Pitter, Panther, Patter' – his very last officially recorded feature."

Professional ratings
Review scores
Source	Rating
AllMusic	4.5/5 stars
The Penguin Guide to Jazz Recordings	2.5/4 stars
The Rolling Stone Jazz Record Guide	2/5 stars

== Track listing ==
All compositions by Duke Ellington except as indicated

1. "The Piano Player"
2. "Creole Love Call"
3. "Don't You Know I Care (Or Don't You Care to Know)" (Mack David, Ellington)
4. "I Can't Get Started" (Vernon Duke, Ira Gershwin)
5. "New York, New York"
6. "Pitter Panther Patter" (Ellington, Jimmy Blanton)
7. "How High the Moon" (Nancy Hamilton, Morgan Lewis)
8. "Basin Street Blues" (Spencer Williams)
9. "Tiger Rag" (Nick La Rocca, Eddie Edwards, Henry Ragas, Tony Sbarbaro, Larry Shields, Harry Da Costa)
10. "Woods"
11. "Meditation"
- Recorded in concert at the Congress Theatre, Eastbourne, England on December 1, 1973.

== Personnel ==
- Duke Ellington – piano, conductor
- Mercer Ellington, Money Johnson, Johnny Coles, Barry Lee Hall – trumpet
- Vince Prudente, Art Baron, Chuck Connors – trombone
- Harry Carney, Harold Ashby, Russell Procope, Geezil Minerve, Percy Marion – reeds
- Joe Benjamin – bass
- Rocky White – drums
- Anita Moore, Money Johnson – vocals
