= New Orleans Suite =

Studio album by Duke Ellington
- Released: 1970
- Recorded: April 27 & May 13, 1970
- Studio: National, New York City
- Genre: Jazz
- Label: Atlantic

Duke Ellington chronology
The Pianist (1966–70)	New Orleans Suite (1970)	Orchestral Works (1970)

New Orleans Suite is a studio album by the American pianist, composer, and bandleader Duke Ellington, recorded and released on the Atlantic label in 1970. The album contains the final recordings of longtime Ellington saxophonist Johnny Hodges, who died between the album's two recording sessions. The album won a Grammy Award in 1971 for Best Jazz Performance by a Big Band.

The suite was commissioned by George Wein for the 1970 New Orleans Jazz Festival.

== Reception ==
Professional ratings
Review scores
Source	Rating
AllMusic	3/5 stars
DownBeat	5/5 stars
The Penguin Guide to Jazz	4/4 stars
The Rolling Stone Jazz Record Guide	4/5 stars

Dan Morgenstern's glowing review of the album in 1971 for DownBeat awarded it five stars. "The music is evocative, highly atmospheric and marked throughout by the gorgeous ensemble textures that set this orchestra apart from every other big band in the history of jazz", he wrote. "This is a great record, and by any standard one of the major musical events of 1971." Morgenstern had praise for several of the soloists, especially Johnny Hodges in his swan song, Paul Gonsalves' "profoundly emotional" tribute to both Sidney Bechet and Hodges, Cootie Williams, Norris Turney, and Harold Ashby.

In his review for Sounds, Jack Hutton remarked that "a Creole influence permeates the work, a lazy Delta feel laden with nostalgic sadness which is a probably a truer reflection of the historic city than the good-time trad which has helped to popularise it." He praised the solos of Norris Turney, criticized those of Cootie Williams, and concluded that "This suite, while it doesn't rank with Ellington's greatest works, proves that the piano player is still vitally creative well into his seventies."

The Penguin Guide to Jazz included the album as part of its suggested "Core Collection," and awarded it the guide's maximum rating of four stars.

== Track listing ==
All compositions by Duke Ellington.

1. "Blues for New Orleans" – 7:40
2. "Bourbon Street Jingling Jollies" – 4:00
3. "Portrait of Louis Armstrong" – 3:02
4. "Thanks for the Beautiful Land on the Delta" – 3:38
5. "Portrait of Wellman Braud" – 4:05
6. "Second Line" – 6:00
7. "Portrait of Sidney Bechet" – 3:55
8. "Aristocracy a la Jean Lafitte" – 3:57
9. "Portrait of Mahalia Jackson" – 4:53
- Recorded at National Recording Studio in New York, NY, on April 27 (tracks 1, 2, 4, 6 & 8) and May 13 (tracks 3, 5, 7 & 9), 1970.

== Personnel ==
- Duke Ellington – piano
- Cootie Williams – trumpet
- Fred Stone – trumpet
- Money Johnson, Al Rubin – trumpet (tracks 1, 2, 4, 6 & 8)
- Cat Anderson – trumpet (tracks 3, 5, 7 & 9)
- Booty Wood – trombone
- Julian Priester – trombone
- Dave Taylor – bass trombone (tracks 1, 2, 4, 6 & 8)
- Chuck Connors – bass trombone (tracks 3, 5, 7 & 9)
- Russell Procope – alto saxophone, clarinet
- Johnny Hodges – alto saxophone (tracks 1, 2, 4, 6 & 8)
- Norris Turney – alto saxophone, clarinet, flute
- Harold Ashby – tenor saxophone, clarinet
- Paul Gonsalves – tenor saxophone
- Harry Carney – baritone saxophone, clarinet, bass clarinet
- Wild Bill Davis – organ (track 1)
- Joe Benjamin – bass
- Rufus Jones – drums
