= The Afro-Eurasian Eclipse =

Studio album by Duke Ellington
- Released: 1975
- Recorded: February 17, 1971
- Studio: National Recording Studio, New York City
- Genre: Jazz
- Length: 37:33
- Label: Fantasy; F-9498
- Producer: Mercer Ellington

Duke Ellington chronology
| The Intimacy of the Blues (1986) | The Afro-Eurasian Eclipse (1975) | Studio Sessions New York & Chicago, 1965, 1966 & 1971 (1987) |

The Afro-Eurasian Eclipse (subtitled A Suite in Eight Parts) is a studio album by American pianist, composer, and bandleader Duke Ellington. First premiered at the Monterey Jazz Festival in 1970, it was recorded the following year in 1971 and released on the Fantasy label in 1975. Like other world music-influenced suites composed in the last decade of his life, The Afro-Eurasian Eclipse was called by NPR music critic David Brent Johnson one of Ellington's, "late-period masterpieces".

The album opens with a short spoken word introduction in which Ellington explains that the suite's title is inspired by Marshall McLuhan's vision of the onset of global cultural identity; Ellington explained: "Mr. McLuhan says that the whole world is going oriental and that no one will be able to retain his or her identity, not even the Orientals. And of course we travel around the world a lot, and in the last five to six years we too have noticed this thing to be true."

== Reception ==
AllMusic gave the album four stars out of five, with Rovi Staff describing it as "Compelling, cosmopolitan, and organic... All in all, a textured, cross-cultural treat for the ears". Meanwhile, musicologist Edward Green of the Manhattan School of Music was critical of the album's concept, writing, "there are occasional evocations of Asia in this album... But they arise, it appears, from a source at once transient and superficial. Ellington's heart simply was elsewhere—always given to American music; and most specifically African-American music."

Professional ratings
Review scores
| Source | Rating |
|---|---|
| AllMusic | 4/5 stars |
| The Penguin Guide to Jazz Recordings | 👑 |
| The Rolling Stone Album Guide | 4/5 stars |

== Legacy ==
The 2001 Duke Ellington tribute album Red Hot + Indigo includes two compositions from The Afro-Eurasian Eclipse: "Didjeridoo" is performed by the jazz-influenced post-rock band Tortoise, and "Acht O'Clock Rock" is performed by jazz-fusion trio Medeski Martin & Wood, who also covered "Chinoiserie" on their 1995 album Friday Afternoon in the Universe, and have often performed these and other Ellington compositions live.

== Track listing ==
All compositions are written by Duke Ellington.

| No. | Title | Length |
|---|---|---|
| 1. | "Chinoiserie" | 8:12 |
| 2. | "Didjeridoo" | 3:37 |
| 3. | "Afrique" | 5:24 |
| 4. | "Acht O'Clock Rock" | 3:04 |
| 5. | "Gong" | 4:43 |
| 6. | "Tang" | 4:47 |
| 7. | "True" | 3:36 |
| 8. | "Hard Way" | 4:10 |
| Total length: | | 37:33 |

Notes:

- Recorded at National Recording Studio in New York, NY, on February 17, 1971.
- Track 1 opens with a short spoken word introduction; "Chinoiserie" begins at 1:36.
- Ellington's "Afrique" is not to be confused with the Lee Morgan composition of the same name.

== Personnel ==
- Duke Ellington – piano
- Russell Procope – alto saxophone, clarinet
- Norris Turney – clarinet, alto saxophone, flute
- Harold Ashby, Paul Gonsalves – tenor saxophone
- Harry Carney – baritone saxophone
- Mercer Ellington, Money Johnson, Eddie Preston, Cootie Williams – trumpet
- Malcolm Taylor, Booty Wood – trombone
- Chuck Connors – bass trombone
- Joe Benjamin – bass
- Rufus Jones – drums

Technical

- Roger Rhodes – recording engineer
- Jim Stern – remix engineer (at Fantasy Studios, Berkeley, 1975)
- Mercer Ellington – remix supervision
- Gary Hobish – remastering (at Fantasy Studios, 1991; Fantasy: OJCCD-645-2 [CD])
- Stanley Dance – liner notes
- Phil Carroll – art direction
