= Studio Sessions New York, 1968 =

1987 album by Duke Ellington

Studio album by Duke Ellington
- Released: 1987
- Recorded: November 6, 1968, and June 15, 1970
- Genre: Jazz
- Length: 64:59
- Label: LMR
- Producer: Duke Ellington

Duke Ellington chronology
Second Sacred Concert (1968)	Studio Sessions New York, 1968 (1987)	70th Birthday Concert (1969)

Studio Sessions New York, 1968 is the ninth volume of The Private Collection, a series documenting recordings made by American pianist, composer and bandleader Duke Ellington for his personal collection which was first released on the LMR label in 1987 and later on the Saja label.

== Reception ==
Professional ratings
Review scores
Source	Rating
AllMusic	3/5 stars

The AllMusic review by Scott Yanow awarded the album 3 stars and stated: "Even after 30 years of playing some of these standards, Ellington found new ways to re-arrange... Lots of surprises on this fine CD."

== Track listing ==
All compositions by Duke Ellington except as indicated

1. "I Can't Get Started" (Vernon Duke, Ira Gershwin) – 4:27
2. "Waiting for You" – 4:10
3. "Knuf" – 2:32
4. "Gigl" – 5:01
5. "Meditation" – 2:34
6. "Sophisticated Lady" (Ellington, Irving Mills, Mitchell Parish) – 2:53
7. "Just Squeeze Me (But Please Don't Tease Me)" (Ellington, Lee Gaines) – 4:14
8. "Mood Indigo" (Barney Bigard, Ellington, Mills) – 4:43
9. "In a Sentimental Mood" (Ellington, Manny Kurtz, Mills) – 2:52
10. "I Let a Song Go Out of My Heart" (Ellington, Mills, Henry Nemo, John Redmond) – 4:02
11. "Don't Get Around Much Anymore" (Mercer Ellington) – 4:02
12. "Reva" – 4:14
13. "Ortseam" – 2:04
14. "Cool and Groovy" (Ellington, Cootie Williams) – 2:29
15. "Elos" – 5:39
16. "C Jam Blues" (Bigard, Ellington) – 9:03
- Recorded at National Recording Studio, New York, on November 23, 1968 (track 1), November 29, 1968 (tracks 2–12), and December 3, 1968 (tracks 13–16).

== Personnel ==
- Duke Ellington – piano
- Cat Anderson, Willie Cook, Money Johnson, Cootie Williams – trumpet (tracks 2–16)
- Lawrence Brown, Buster Cooper – trombone (tracks 2–16)
- Chuck Connors – bass trombone (tracks 2–16)
- Johnny Hodges – alto saxophone (tracks 2–16)
- Russell Procope – alto saxophone, clarinet (tracks 2–16)
- Harold Ashby – tenor saxophone, clarinet
- Paul Gonsalves – tenor saxophone (tracks 2–16)
- Harry Carney – baritone saxophone (tracks 2–16)
- Jeff Castleman – bass, electric bass on track 3
- Rufus Jones – drums
