= The Jaywalker =

2004 album by Duke Ellington

Studio album by Duke Ellington
- Released: 2004
- Recorded: March 29 & August 18, 1966 and March 23, April 24 & June 23, 1967
- Genre: Jazz
- Label: Storyville

Duke Ellington chronology
Berlin '65 - Paris '67 (1965)	The Jaywalker (2004)	The Greatest Jazz Concert in the World (1967)

The Jaywalker is a studio album by American pianist, composer and bandleader Duke Ellington featuring tracks recorded in 1966 and 1967 and released on the Storyville label in 2004.

== Reception ==
Professional ratings
Review scores
Source	Rating
AllMusic	3.5/5 stars
The Penguin Guide to Jazz Recordings	3/4 stars

The AllMusic review by Ken Dryden states: "Some tracks are obviously not as polished as his later (and better-known) studio or live recordings. But it is always fascinating to hear works in progress by Ellington... Serious collectors of Ellington will enjoy this compilation."

== Track listing ==
All compositions by Duke Ellington, except as indicated

No.	Title	Length
1.	"The Shepherd"	6:29
2.	"Up Jump"	3:06
3.	"Rue Bleu"	3:02
4.	"Chromatic Love Affair"	4:02
5.	"Salomé" (Raymond Fol)	4:14
6.	"Blood Count" (Billy Strayhorn)	3:50
7.	"El Viti"	3:27
8.	"Kixx"	3:55
9.	"Eggo"	5:37
10.	"I'm Hip Too"	0:36
11.	"Amta"	2:51
12.	"Warr"	4:23
13.	"Little Purple Flower"	4:32
14.	"Traffic Cop"	3:50
15.	"Untitled Blues"	4:52
16.	"Polícia"	1:42
17.	"The B.O. of Traffic"	0:43
18.	"Mac"	2:37
19.	"Traffic Extension"	5:37
20.	"Star"	0:54
21.	"Cross Climax"	0:27
22.	"B.O. Man"	3:11
23.	"Tin Soldier"	2:24

- Recorded at RCA Studio in New York on March 29, 1966 (track 7), August 18, 1966 (track 23), March 23, 1967 (tracks 14–22), April 24, 1967 (tracks 8–13), and June 23, 1967 (tracks 1–6).

== Personnel ==
- Duke Ellington – piano
- Cat Anderson, Mercer Ellington (tracks 1–7 & 23), Herb Jones, Cootie Williams – trumpet
- Lawrence Brown, Buster Cooper – trombone
- Chuck Connors – bass trombone
- Russell Procope – alto saxophone, clarinet
- Johnny Hodges – alto saxophone
- Jimmy Hamilton – tenor saxophone, clarinet
- Paul Gonsalves – tenor saxophone
- Harry Carney – baritone saxophone, clarinet, bass clarinet
- Jimmy Jones – piano (tracks 1–6)
- John Lamb – bass
- Chris Columbus (tracks 1–6), Bobby Durham (tracks 8–22), Sam Woodyard (tracks 7 & 23) – drums
- Emanuel Abdul-Rahim – congas (tracks 8–22)
