= The Intimate Ellington =

1977 album by Duke Ellington

Studio album by Duke Ellington
- Released: 1977
- Recorded: May 23, July 14 & August 29, 1969, June 15, & December 9, 1970, and February 1, 2, May 5, & June 29, 1971.
- Genre: Jazz
- Length: 44:49
- Label: Pablo
- Producer: Duke Ellington

Duke Ellington chronology
Studio Sessions New York & Chicago, 1965, 1966 & 1971 (1965–71)	The Intimate Ellington (1977)	Togo Brava Suite (1971)

The Intimate Ellington is a studio album by the American pianist, composer, and bandleader Duke Ellington. It was compiled from sessions recorded in 1969, 1970, and 1971, and released on the Pablo label in 1977.

== Reception ==
Professional ratings
Review scores
Source	Rating
AllMusic	5/5 stars
The Penguin Guide to Jazz Recordings	2.5/4 stars
The Rolling Stone Jazz Record Guide	3/5 stars

The AllMusic review by Scott Yanow states: "Even this late in his life, Duke Ellington had a great deal to say musically and his band continued to rank near the top."

== Track listing ==
All compositions by Duke Ellington except as indicated

1. "Moon Maiden" – 2:42
2. "Edward the First" – 3:20
3. "Symphonette" (Ellington, Billy Strayhorn) – 5:03
4. "Intimate Interlude" – 5:01
5. "Some Summer Fun" – 5:18
6. "Layin' on Mellow" – 2:13
7. "Eulb" – 2:34
8. "Tenz" – 2:27
9. "I Got It Bad (And That Ain't Good)" (Ellington, Paul Francis Webster) – 5:30
10. "Sophisticated Lady" (Ellington, Irving Mills, Mitchell Parish) – 4:57
11. "Edward the Second" – 5:44

- Recorded at National Recording Studio, New York, NY on May 23, 1969 (track 2), July 14, 1969 (track 1), August 29, 1969 (track 6), June 15, 1970 (track 5), December 9, 1970 (track 9 & 10), February 1, 1971 (track 11), February 2, 1971 (track 4), May 5, 1971 (track 3), June 29, 1971 (tracks 7 & 8).

== Personnel ==
- Duke Ellington – piano (tracks 2–11), celeste & vocals (track 1)
- Wild Bill Davis – organ (tracks 6, 9 & 10)
- Cat Anderson (tracks 4, 5 & 9–10), Willie Cook (track 6), Mercer Ellington (tracks 3, 5, 7 & 8), Money Johnson (tracks 3, 4, 7–10), Al Rubin (tracks 9, 10), Frank Stone (track 5), Cootie Williams (tracks 3–5, 7–10), Richard Williams (tracks 7 & 8) – trumpet
- Lawrence Brown (track 6), Julian Priester (track 5), Malcolm Taylor (tracks 3, 4, 7–10), Booty Wood (tracks 3–5, 7–10) – trombone
- Chuck Connors – bass trombone (tracks 3–5, 7–10)
- Johnny Hodges (track 6), Buddy Pearson, (track 3, 7 & 8), Norris Turney (tracks 3–5, 7–10) – alto saxophone
- Russell Procope – alto saxophone, clarinet (tracks 4–10)
- Harold Ashby (tracks 3–10), Paul Gonsalves (tracks 3, 4 & 6–8) – tenor saxophone
- Harry Carney – baritone saxophone (tracks 3–10)
- Joe Benjamin (track 3–5, 7–11), Paul Kondziela (track 2, 6) – bass
- Rufus Jones (track 2–11) – drums
