= 70th Birthday Concert (Duke Ellington album) =

1970 live album by Duke Ellington

Live album by Duke Ellington
- Released: 1970
- Recorded: November 25 & 26, 1969
- Genre: Jazz
- Label: Solid State

Duke Ellington chronology
Second Sacred Concert (1968)	70th Birthday Concert (1970)	Latin American Suite (1972)

70th Birthday Concert is a live album by American pianist, composer and bandleader Duke Ellington recorded in England recorded at the Free Trade Hall in Manchester, England and originally released on the Solid State label in 1970. The album was later reissued on CD on the Blue Note label in 1995.

== Reception ==
The Allmusic review by Scott Yanow stated:

The live performance gives listeners a good idea as to just how Duke's ensemble sounded in concert, and it serves as both a retrospective and a display of the strengths of Ellington's mighty band... This gem is essential for all serious jazz collections.

Professional ratings
Review scores
Source	Rating
Allmusic	4.5/5 stars

== Track listing ==
All tracks are written by Duke Ellington, except where noted.

No.	Title	Writer(s)	Length
1.	"Kinda Dukish/Rockin' in Rhythm"	Ellington, Harry Carney, Irving Mills	5:53
2.	"B.P. Blues"		4:41
3.	"Take the "A" Train"	Billy Strayhorn	5:48
4.	"Tootie for Cootie"	Ellington, Jimmy Hamilton	6:27
5.	"4:30 Blues"		4:21
6.	"El Gato"	Cat Anderson	4:22
7.	"Black Butterfly"	Ellington, Irving Mills	4:46
8.	"Things Ain't What They Used to Be"	Mercer Ellington	3:02
9.	"Layin' on Mellow"		5:04
10.	"Satin Doll"	Ellington, Strayhorn, Johnny Mercer	5:37
11.	"Azure"	Ellington, Mills	4:57
12.	"In Triplicate"		6:55
13.	"Perdido"	Juan Tizol	3:22
14.	"Fifi"		3:41
15.	"Medley: Prelude to a Kiss; I'm Just a Lucky So-and-So; I Let a Song Go Out of My Heart; Do Nothin' Till You Hear From Me; Just Squeeze Me (But Please Don't Tease Me); Don't Get Around Much Anymore; Mood Indigo; Sophisticated Lady; Caravan"	Ellington, Mills, Gordon; Ellington, David; Ellington, Mills, Nemo, Redmond; Ellington, Russell; Ellington, Gaines; Ellington, Russell; Ellington, Mills, Bigard; Ellington, Mills, Parish; Tizol	15:11
16.	"Black Swan"		9:23
17.	"Final Ellington Speech (Satin Doll)"	Ellington, Strayhorn, Mercer	2:05

- Recorded at Colston Hall in Bristol, England on November 25 (track 10) and Free Trade Hall in Manchester, England on November 26 (tracks 1–9 & 10–17), 1969.

== Personnel ==
- Duke Ellington – piano
- Cat Anderson, Mercer Ellington, Rolf Ericson, Cootie Williams – trumpet
- Lawrence Brown – trombone
- Chuck Connors – bass trombone
- Russell Procope – alto saxophone, clarinet
- Johnny Hodges – alto saxophone
- Norris Turney – clarinet, alto saxophone, tenor saxophone, flute
- Harold Ashby – tenor saxophone, flute
- Paul Gonsalves – tenor saxophone
- Harry Carney – clarinet, bass clarinet, baritone saxophone
- Wild Bill Davis – organ
- Victor Gaskin – bass
- Rufus Jones – drums
