= The Intimacy of the Blues =

1986 album by Duke Ellington

Studio album by Duke Ellington
- Released: 1986
- Recorded: March 15, 1967 and January 7 & June 15, 1970
- Genre: Jazz
- Length: 42:00
- Label: Fantasy
- Producer: Duke Ellington

Duke Ellington chronology
Orchestral Works (1970)	The Intimacy of the Blues (1986)	The Intimate Ellington (1969-71)

The Intimacy of the Blues is a studio album by the American pianist, composer and bandleader Duke Ellington, recorded in 1967 and 1970, and released on the Fantasy label in 1986.

== Reception ==
Professional ratings
Review scores
Source	Rating
AllMusic	2.5/5 stars
The Penguin Guide to Jazz Recordings	3.5/4 stars

The AllMusic review by Scott Yanow states: "Duke Ellington did a remarkable number of private recordings with small groups taken from his orchestra and the selections included on this CD reissue are some of the best... Excellent music".

== Track listing ==
All compositions by Duke Ellington except as indicated

1. "The Intimacy of the Blues" (Billy Strayhorn) – 4:01
2. "Out South" – 2:37
3. "Tell Me 'Bout My Baby" – 3:19
4. "Kentucky Avenue" – 4:01
5. "Near North" – 2:36
6. "Soul Country" – 2:10
7. "Noon Mooning" – 6:04
8. "Rockochet" – 4:22
9. "Tippy-Toeing Through the Jungle Garden" – 5:55
10. "Just A-Sittin' and A-Rockin''" (Ellington, Strayhorn, Lee Gaines) – 3:00
11. "All Too Soon" (Ellington, Carl Sigman) – 3:51

- Recorded at RCA Studio B in New York, NY, on March 15, 1967 (tracks 1–6); in Las Vegas, Nevada on January 7, 1970 (tracks 7–9); and at National Recording Studio, New York, NY on July 15, 1970 (tracks 10 & 11).

== Personnel ==
- Duke Ellington – piano
- Wild Bill Davis – organ (tracks 7, 9, & 10)
- Cat Anderson (tracks 1–6 & 11), Willie Cook (tracks 7–9) – trumpet
- Lawrence Brown – trombone (tracks 1–9)
- Johnny Hodges – alto saxophone (tracks 1–6)
- Harold Ashby (track 11), Paul Gonsalves (tracks 1–10) – tenor saxophone
- Harry Carney – baritone saxophone (tracks 1–6)
- Norris Turney – flute (track 10)
- Joe Benjamin (tracks 10 & 11), Victor Gaskin (tracks 7–9), John Lamb (tracks 1–6), Paul Kondziela (tracks 7–9) – bass
- Rufus Jones – drums
