= Eddie and Sugar Lou's Hotel Tyler Orchestra =

Eddie Fennell and Sugar Lou Morgan's Hotel Tyler Orchestra (circa 1920s-30s) was an early blues-tinged jazz band from Austin, Texas. The Hotel Tyler was in Tyler, Texas. One of the band's eleven 78 rpm phonograph record sides was "KWKH Blues," which was commissioned as a theme song for radio station KWKH in Shreveport, Louisiana. All eleven sides were recorded in Dallas, Texas in October 1929 and November 1930. Money Johnson was in the band early in his career. Regular members were: Henry Thompson (tp), Stanlee Hardee (tp), Albert Mitchell (tb), Adrian Kenney (as/bar), Charles "Sugar Lou" Morgan (p), Eddie Fennell (bj/vcl, arr), and Lee Scott (dr).
