= Latin American Suite =

1972 album by Duke Ellington

Studio album by Duke Ellington
- Released: 1972
- Recorded: November 5, 1968 & January 7, 1970
- Genre: Jazz
- Length: 36:43
- Label: Fantasy
- Producer: Duke Ellington

Duke Ellington chronology
70th Birthday Concert (1969)	Latin American Suite (1972)	The Pianist (1966-70)

Latin American Suite is a studio album by the American pianist, composer and bandleader Duke Ellington, mainly recorded in 1968, with one track completed in 1970, and released on the Fantasy label in 1972.

== Reception ==
Professional ratings
Review scores
Source	Rating
AllMusic	3/5 stars
The Penguin Guide to Jazz Recordings	3.5/4 stars
The Rolling Stone Jazz Record Guide	3/5 stars

The AllMusic review by Ken Dryden states: "It's a shame that Ellington chose not to keep any of these originals in his repertoire once work was completed on this album."

== Track listing ==
All compositions by Duke Ellington except as indicated

1. "Oclupaca" – 4:20
2. "Chico Cuadradino" (Ellington, Mercer Ellington) – 5:00
3. "Eque" – 3:30
4. "Tina" – 4:34
5. "The Sleeping Lady and the Giant Who Watches over Her" – 7:25
6. "Latin American Sunshine" – 6:52
7. "Brasilliance" – 5:02

- Recorded at National Recording Studio in New York, NY, on November 5, 1968 (tracks 1–3 & 5–7) and January 7, 1970 in Las Vegas, Nevada (track 4).

== Personnel ==
- Duke Ellington – piano
- Cat Anderson, Willie Cook, Mercer Ellington, Cootie Williams – trumpet (tracks 1–3 & 5–7)
- Lawrence Brown, Buster Cooper – trombone (tracks 1–3 & 5–7)
- Chuck Connors – bass trombone, tenor saxophone (tracks 1–3 & 5–7)
- Johnny Hodges – alto saxophone (tracks 1–3 & 5–7)
- Russell Procope – alto saxophone, clarinet (tracks 1–3 & 5–7)
- Paul Gonsalves – tenor saxophone (tracks 1–3 & 5–7)
- Harold Ashby – tenor saxophone, clarinet (tracks 1–3 & 5–7)
- Harry Carney – baritone saxophone (tracks 1–3 & 5–7)
- Jeff Castleman (tracks 1–3 & 5–7), Paul Kondziela (track 4) – bass
- Rufus Jones – drums
