= Studio Sessions, 1957, 1965, 1966, 1967, San Francisco, Chicago, New York =

1987 album by Duke Ellington

Studio Sessions 1957, 1965, 1966, 1967, San Francisco, Chicago, New York

Studio album by Duke Ellington
- Released: 1987
- Recorded: January 1957; March 17, 1965; April 14, 1965; August 30, 1965; December 28, 1966; July 11, 1967
- Genre: Jazz
- Length: 63:05
- Label: LMR
- Producer: Duke Ellington

Duke Ellington chronology
| The Greatest Jazz Concert in the World (1967) | Studio Sessions 1957, 1965, 1966, 1967, San Francisco, Chicago, New York (1987) | North of the Border in Canada (1967) |

Studio Sessions, 1957, 1965, 1966, 1967, San Francisco, Chicago, New York is the eighth volume of The Private Collection (published by the Canadian label Unidisc as AGEK 2038) – whereas is Volume 5 in the edition of the collection by the English KAZ Jazz Masters label – a series documenting recordings made by American pianist, composer and bandleader Duke Ellington for his personal collection which was first released on the LMR label in 1987 and later on the Saja label.

== Reception ==
Professional ratings
Review scores
| Source | Rating |
|---|---|
| AllMusic | 4.5/5 stars |

The AllMusic review by Scott Yanow awarded the album 4½ stars and stated that the album "features particularly strong moments from trumpeter Cat Anderson, altoist Johnny Hodges and tenorman Paul Gonsalves on many little-played Ellington compositions".

== Track listing ==
All compositions by Duke Ellington except as indicated

1. "Countdown" – 2:32
2. "When I'm Feeling Kinda Blue" – 5:50
3. "El Viti" (Gerald Wilson) – 3:21
4. "Draggin' Blues" – 6:10
5. "Cotton Tail" – 3:42
6. "Now Ain't It" – 4:16
7. "The Last Go-Round" – 3:32
8. "Moon Mist" – 6:13
9. "Skillipoop" – 2:00
10. "Banquet Scene (Timon of Athens)" – 2:20
11. "Love Scene" (Barer, Ellington) 3:08
12. "Rod la Rocque" – 4:13
13. "Rhythm Section Blues" – 3:09
14. "Lele" – 3:07
15. "Ocht O'Clock Rock" – 3:16
16. "Lady" (Ellington, Irving Mills, Mitchell Parish) – 3:33
17. "Rondolet" – 2:43
- Recorded in Chicago late January 1957 (track 8), at Fine Studios, New York, on March 17, 1965 (tracks 9–10), at Coast Recorders Studio, San Francisco, on April 14, 1965 (tracks 11–13), and August 30, 1965 (tracks 1–3), at RCA Studio B, New York, on December 28, 1966 (tracks 4–7), and July 11, 1967 (tracks 14–17).

== Personnel ==
- Duke Ellington – piano
- Ray Nance – cornet (tracks 9 & 10), trumpet (track 8)
- Nat Adderley (tracks 1–3 & 11–13), Cat Anderson, Willie Cook (track 8), Mercer Ellington (tracks 1–3 & 11–17), Herb Jones (tracks 9, 10 & 14–17), Howard McGhee (tracks 9 & 10), Allen Smith (tracks 1–3 & 11–13), Clark Terry (track 8), Cootie Williams (tracks 4–7 & 14–17) – trumpet
- Lawrence Brown (tracks 1–3 & 8–17), Buster Cooper (tracks 1–3 & 8–17), Quentin Jackson (track 8), Britt Woodman (track 8) – trombone
- John Sanders – valve trombone (track 8)
- Van Hughes – trombone
- Chuck Connors – bass trombone (tracks 1–3 & 8–17)
- Jimmy Hamilton – clarinet, tenor saxophone (tracks 1–3 & 8–17)
- Russell Procope – alto saxophone, clarinet (tracks 1–3 & 8–17)
- Johnny Hodges – alto saxophone
- Paul Gonsalves – tenor saxophone
- Harry Carney – baritone saxophone
- John Lamb (track 1–7 & 9–17), Jimmy Woode (track 8) – bass
- Louis Bellson (tracks 1–3 & 11–13), Chris Columbus (tracks 14–17), Rufus Jones (tracks 4–7), Sam Woodyard (tracks 8–10) – drums
