= The Greatest Jazz Concert in the World =

1975 compilation album

Live album by Various artists
- Released: 1975
- Recorded: March 26 and July 1, 1967
- Venue: Carnegie Hall, New York City; Hollywood Bowl, Los Angeles
- Genre: Jazz
- Length: 182:09
- Label: Pablo
- Producer: Norman Granz

Duke Ellington chronology
The Jaywalker (1966-67)	The Greatest Jazz Concert in the World (1975)	Studio Sessions, 1957, 1965, 1966, 1967, San Francisco, Chicago, New York (1957-67)

The Greatest Jazz Concert in the World is a 1967 live album featuring Duke Ellington and his orchestra, Ella Fitzgerald, Oscar Peterson, T-Bone Walker, Coleman Hawkins, Clark Terry and Zoot Sims. It was released in 1975.

Billy Strayhorn's "Blood Count" was debuted at the Carnegie Hall concert featured on the album. It was Strayhorn's last composition; he died a few months after the piece was recorded.

The album marked the last recorded collaboration between Fitzgerald and Ellington and his orchestra.

The album contains the last recordings of Coleman Hawkins. During the opening of "Sweet Georgia Brown", Hawkins can be heard to say "I guess I've gotta go through with it". Then someone replies "That's right".

== Reception ==
Professional ratings
Review scores
Source	Rating
AllMusic	4.5/5 stars

The AllMusic review by Scott Yanow noted: "In addition to having a somewhat immodest title, this three-CD set was not actually one single concert but two...the music on the reissue is often quite special...Maybe this really was 'the Greatest Jazz Concert' after all".

== Track listing ==
Disc One

1. "Smedley" (Oscar Peterson) – 4:16
2. "Some Day My Prince Will Come" (Frank Churchill, Larry Morey) – 4:59
3. "Daytrain" (Peterson) – 5:53
4. "Now's the Time" (Charlie Parker) – 8:26
5. "Memories of You" (Eubie Blake, Andy Razaf) – 2:22
6. "Misty" (Johnny Burke, Erroll Garner) – 2:45
7. "I Can't Get Started" (Vernon Duke, Ira Gershwin) – 2:26
8. "Wee Dot" (J.J. Johnson, Leo Parker) – 9:49
9. "Moonglow" (Eddie DeLange, Will Hudson, Irving Mills) – 3:29
10. "Sweet Georgia Brown" (Ben Bernie, Kenneth Casey, Maceo Pinkard) – 4:28
11. "C Jam Blues" (Barney Bigard, Duke Ellington) – 6:12
12. "Woman, You Must Be Crazy" (T-Bone Walker) – 9:08
13. "Stormy Monday" (Walker) – 6:40

Disc Two

1. "Swamp Goo" (Ellington) – 4:54
2. "Girdle Hurdle" (Ellington) – 2:51
3. "The Shepherd" (Ellington) – 6:33
4. "Rue Bleue" (Ellington) – 2:44
5. "Salome" (Raymond Fol) – 3:34
6. "A Chromatic Love Affair" (Ellington) – 3:58
7. "Mount Harissa" (Ellington, Billy Strayhorn) – 6:39
8. "Blood Count" (Strayhorn) – 3:50
9. "Rockin' in Rhythm" (Harry Carney, Ellington, Mills) – 3:40
10. "Very Tenor" (Ellington) – 7:51
11. "Onions (Wild Onions)" (Ellington) – 2:55
12. "Take the 'A' Train" (Strayhorn) – 5:29

Disc Three

1. "Satin Doll" (Ellington, Johnny Mercer, Strayhorn) – 5:25
2. "Tootie for Cootie" (Ellington, Jimmy Hamilton) – 6:45
3. "Up Jump" (Ellington) – 3:38
4. "Prelude to a Kiss" (Ellington, Mack Gordon, Mills) – 4:39
5. "Mood Indigo"/"I Got It Bad (and That Ain't Good)" (Bigard, Ellington, Mills)/(Ellington, Paul Francis Webster) – 6:08
6. "Things Ain't What They Used to Be" (Mercer Ellington, Ted Persons) – 4:31
7. "Don't Be That Way" (Benny Goodman, Mitchell Parish, Edgar Sampson) – 4:09
8. "You've Changed" (Bill Carey, Carl T. Fischer) – 4:12
9. "Let's Do It (Let's Fall in Love)" (Cole Porter) – 4:38
10. "On the Sunny Side of the Street" (Dorothy Fields, Jimmy McHugh) – 2:14
11. "It's Only a Paper Moon" (Harold Arlen, Yip Harburg, Billy Rose) – 2:31
12. "Day Dream" (Ellington, John La Touche, Strayhorn) – 4:49
13. "If I Could Be with You (One Hour Tonight)" (Henry Creamer, James P. Johnson) – 3:18
14. "Between the Devil and the Deep Blue Sea" (Harold Arlen, Ted Koehler) – 3:50
15. "Cotton Tail" (Ellington) – 5:29

Disc One

- Tracks 1–3: The Oscar Peterson trio
- Tracks 4–8: Jam session with Sam Jones, Benny Carter, Bobby Durham, Zoot Sims and Paul Gonsalves
- Tracks 9–10: Coleman Hawkins with the Oscar Peterson trio & Paul Gonsalves
- Track 11: Jam session with Oscar Peterson, Sam Jones, Louis Hayes, Coleman Hawkins, Johnny Hodges and Benny Carter
- Tracks 12–13: T-Bone Walker with Oscar Peterson, Clark Terry, Sam Jones, Bobby Durham, Coleman Hawkins, Johnny Hodges and Benny Carter

Disc Two

- Tracks 1–11: Duke Ellington and his orchestra
- Track 12: Oscar Peterson with Duke Ellington and his orchestra

Disc Three

- Tracks 1–6: Duke Ellington and his orchestra
- Tracks 7–10: Ella Fitzgerald with the Duke Ellington orchestra
- Tracks 11–14: Ella Fitzgerald with the Jimmy Jones trio
- Track 15: Ella Fitzgerald with the Jimmy Jones trio and Duke Ellington orchestra

== Personnel ==
- Ella Fitzgerald – vocals
- T–Bone Walker – vocals, guitar
- Clark Terry – trumpet
- Benny Carter – alto saxophone
- Coleman Hawkins – tenor saxophone
- Zoot Sims – tenor saxophone
- Bobby Durham – drums
- Louis Hayes – drums

Oscar Peterson trio

- Oscar Peterson – piano
- Sam Jones – double bass
- Bobby Durham – drums

Jimmy Jones trio

- Jimmy Jones – piano
- Bob Cranshaw – double bass
- Sam Woodyard – drums

Duke Ellington Orchestra

- Duke Ellington – piano
- Cat Anderson – trumpet
- Mercer Ellington – trumpet
- Herbie Jones – trumpet
- Cootie Williams – trumpet
- Buster Cooper – trombone
- Lawrence Brown – trombone
- Chuck Connors – bass trombone
- Jimmy Hamilton – saxophone
- Johnny Hodges – alto saxophone
- Russell Procope – alto saxophone
- Paul Gonsalves – tenor saxophone
- Harry Carney – baritone saxophone
- John Lamb – double bass
- Rufus "Speedy" Jones – drums
