= John Lamb (musician) =

American jazz double bassist (born 1933)

John Lamb (born November 29, 1933) is an American jazz double bassist who was a member of the Duke Ellington Orchestra. Born in Vero Beach, Florida, Lamb as a child loved playing music, specializing in the tuba. He left high school to join the United States Air Force as a musician for their military band. He was stationed in Texas and then Montana, where the long winters left him ample time to practice. When the band's usual string bass player was unavailable for a gig in 1951, the bandmaster asked Lamb if he could play the bass; Lamb immediately said yes, and before long became the band's new string bassist. He credited his tuba experience for giving him the "feel" to pick up string bass quickly without any prior experience.

Lamb joined Duke Ellington's orchestra in 1964, and toured with them for three years. Lamb was more of a fan of Miles Davis and Red Garland when he was with Ellington, later saying, “I was very young and very cocky. I thought I knew more than Duke at that time...I have more time today to reflect on the things that were accomplished back then, and the places we traveled to and all the wonderful people that we met. So one has to be careful what one does in his young years, because if they’re fortunate to live long, it all comes back.” In 1966 Lamb performed with Ellington and Sam Woodyard for artist Joan Miró at the Fondation Maeght in Saint-Paul-de-Vence.

Lamb later moved to St. Petersburg, Florida and taught music in public schools as well as St. Petersburg College. Alphonso Johnson was one of Lamb's students. Lamb was awarded the Jazz Club of Sarasota’s “Satchmo Award” for service to jazz.

== Discography ==
- With the Duke Ellington Orchestra
- In the Uncommon Market (Live 1965-1966, released 1986, Pablo)
- Duke Ellington's Concert of Sacred Music (Live, 1965, RCA)
- Duke Ellington Plays Mary Poppins (1965 Reprise)
- Ellington '66 (1965, Reprise)
- Ella at Duke's Place (1965, Verve)
- Concert in the Virgin Islands (1965, Reprise)
- The Jaywalker (1965-1967, released 2004, Storyville)
- The Far East Suite (1966, Bluebird, RCA)
- The Stockholm Concert, 1966 (Live, Pablo, 1966, released 1984)
- The Intimacy of the Blues (1967-1970, released 1986, Fantasy)
- Studio Sessions, 1957, 1965, 1966, 1967, San Francisco, Chicago, New York (1987, LMR)
- Studio Sessions New York & Chicago, 1965, 1966 & 1971 (1987, LMR)
- The Popular Duke Ellington (1967, RCA)
- Soul Call (Live, 1967, Verve)
- Ella and Duke at the Cote D'Azur (Live, 1967, Verve)
- The Greatest Jazz Concert in the World (Live, 1967, released 1975, Pablo)
- Liederhalle Stuttgart 1967 (SWR, Jazzhaus, 2020)
- The Pianist (1974, Fantasy)
- With Joya Sherrill
- Joya Sherrill Sings Duke (20th Century Fox, 1965)
