= Congress Theatre (Eastbourne) =

Theatre and conference in East Sussex, England

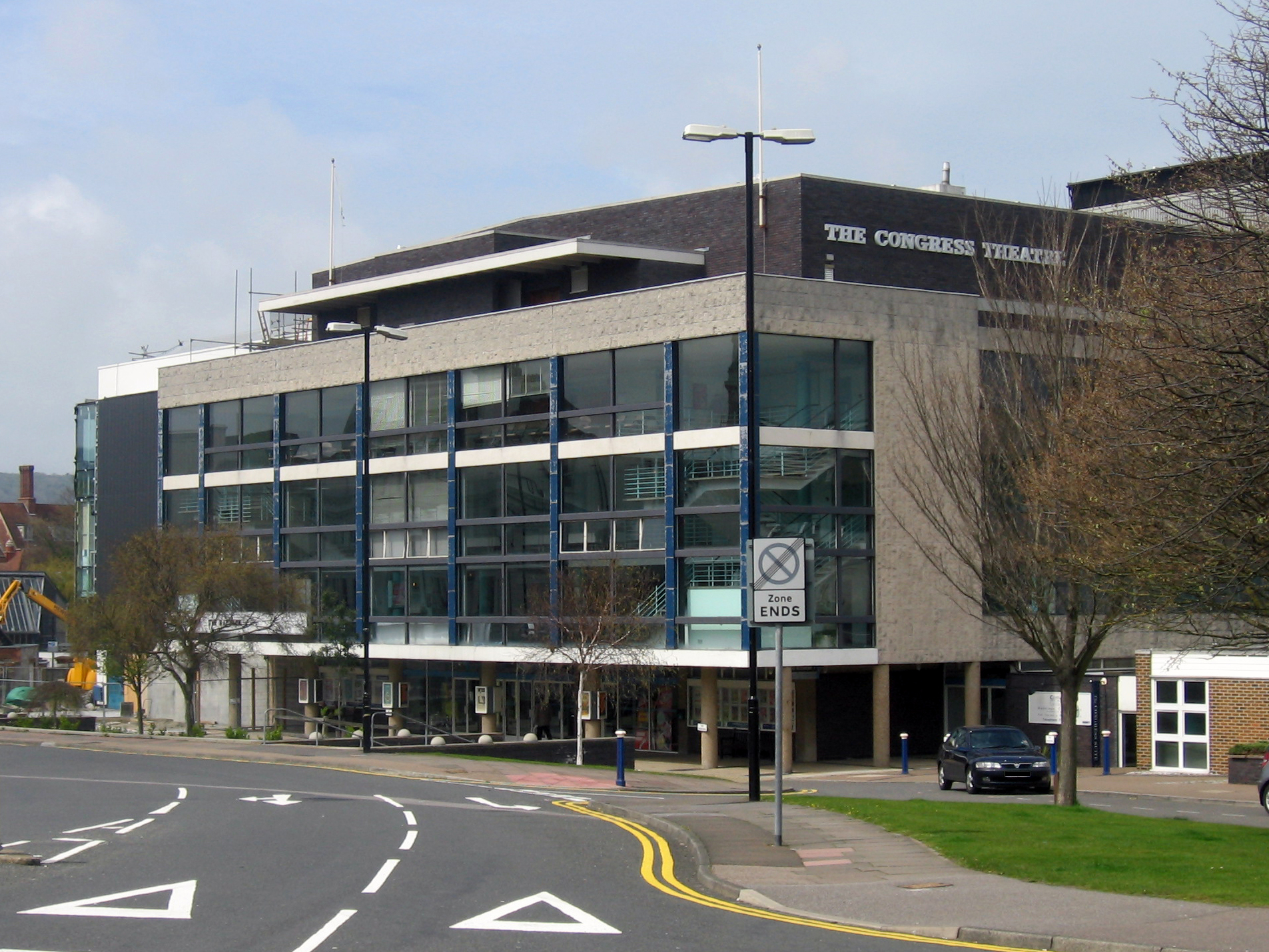
- Congress Theatre exterior
- Interactive map of Congress Theatre
- Address: Carlisle Road; Eastbourne; England, United Kingdom
- Coordinates: 50.7628°N 0.2834°E
- Owner: Eastbourne Borough Council
- Capacity: 1689
- Type: Provincial

Construction
- Opened: 1963

Listed Building – Grade II*
- Official name: Congress Theatre
- Designated: 12 June 1998
- Reference no.: 1323698

Website
- www.eastbournetheatres.co.uk

The Congress Theatre is a Grade II* listed, purpose-built, modern theatre and conference venue in the seaside town of Eastbourne, East Sussex. It is one of the largest theatres in southern England, with seating capacity of 1,689. The theatre was designed in 1958 and built 1961–1963 by Bryan and Norman Westwood Architects. Ove Arup and Partners were engineers and the builders were local firm Llewellyns. The theatre underwent major refurbishment in 2019, to reveal a bright and contemporary look, whilst fully maintaining the character of the original design. Shows include touring West End theatre, ballet, opera, comedy and live music.

The first official performance took place on Thursday June 13th 1963. The opening piece was a trumpet fanfare played by the trumpeters of the Royal Military School of Music, followed by a concert by the London Philharmonic Orchestra conducted by Sir Arthur Bliss. The first function in the theatre had been a few days earlier when it was used by Eastbourne College for its prize-giving ceremony.

On November 2nd 1965 Princess Margaret, Countess of Snowdon and her husband, Lord Snowdon, visited the Congress Theatre to attend a gala concert by the London Symphony Orchestra and unveil a plaque in the presence of the Mayor of Eastbourne.

The Congress Theatre was the location for the final recorded concert by the American pianist, composer and band leader Duke Ellington on 1 December 1973. Ellington died five months later in May 1974.

== Facilities ==
The theatre has a licensed bar, cloakroom facilities, disabled facilities (including an infrared system for the hard of hearing) and public phones (available in the foyer)

== See also ==
- Eastbourne Theatres
- Listed buildings in Eastbourne
