= Duke's Big 4 =

Studio album by Duke Ellington
- Released: 1974
- Recorded: January 8, 1973
- Genre: Jazz
- Length: 38:41
- Label: Pablo
- Producer: Norman Granz

Duke Ellington chronology
Up in Duke’s Workshop (1969-72)	Duke's Big 4 (1974)	It Don't Mean A Thing If It Ain't Got That Swing (1973)

Duke's Big 4 is a studio album by the American pianist, composer and bandleader Duke Ellington, featuring a small group session with Joe Pass, Ray Brown and Louie Bellson, recorded in January 1973 and released on the Pablo label in 1974.

== Reception ==
The AllMusic review by Scott Yanow states: "One of Duke Ellington's finest small group sessions from his final decade was this frequently exciting quartet date... Ellington's percussive style always sounded modern and he comes up with consistently strong solos... Highly recommended."

Professional ratings
Review scores
Source	Rating
AllMusic	4.5/5 stars
The Penguin Guide to Jazz Recordings	2.5/4 stars
The Rolling Stone Jazz Record Guide	4/5 stars

== Track listing ==
All compositions by Duke Ellington except as indicated

1. "Cotton Tail" – 4:17
2. "The Blues" – 5:28
3. "The Hawk Talks" (Louie Bellson) – 5:10
4. "Prelude to a Kiss" (Ellington, Irving Gordon, Irving Mills) – 5:43
5. "Love You Madly" – 6:38
6. "Just Squeeze Me (But Please Don't Tease Me)" (Ellington, Lee Gaines) – 6:07
7. "Everything but You" (Ellington, Don George, Harry James) – 5:19
- Recorded in Los Angeles, California, on January 8, 1973.

== Personnel ==
- Duke Ellington – piano
- Joe Pass – guitar
- Ray Brown – bass
- Louie Bellson – drums
