= Eastbourne Theatres =

British theatre group

Coordinates: 50.763°N 0.284°E

Eastbourne Theatres is a council-owned theatre group responsible for three theatres in Eastbourne, England. The group is responsible for the Congress Theatre, Devonshire Park Theatre and the Winter Garden. The theatres together have a combined capacity of more than 4500 and show a variety of touring productions. The group also produces a variety of productions in-house under a separate arm known as Eastbourne Theatres Productions, some of which have gone on to tour both nationally and internationally.

== Artistic Directors ==
2001–present - Chris Jordan

== Eastbourne Theatres Productions ==
=== 2001 ===
- Relatively Speaking by Alan Ayckbourn (18 July – 18 August)
- You’re Only Young Twice by Ron Aldridge (21 August – 25 September)
- Aladdin (13 December 2001 – 6 January 2002)

=== 2002 ===
- Taking Steps by Alan Ayckbourn (2 – 25 July)
- Stepping Out by Richard Harris (7 August – 14 September)
- Jack & The Beanstalk (10 December 2002 – 5 January 2003)

=== 2003 ===
- Barnum (4 July – 16 August)
- Funny Money by Ray Cooney (28 August – 20 September)
- Cinderella (11 December 2003 – 11 January 2004)

=== 2004 ===
- Nunsense by Dan Goggin (14 August – 18 September)
- Dick Whittington (9 December 2004 – 9 January 2005)

=== 2005 ===
- Telstar by James Hicks (28 February – 5 March)
- Dames at Sea (12 August – 17 September)
- Sleeping Beauty (9 December 2005 – 8 January 2006)

=== 2006 ===
- Neville's Island (16 August – 16 September)
- Aladdin (15 December 2006 – 14 January 2007)

=== 2007 ===
- Solo Season - David Bradley in The Quiz (11 - 17 June)
- By Jeeves by Alan Ayckbourn and Andrew Lloyd Webber (16 August – 8 September)
- Beauty & the Beast (14 December 2007 - 13 January 2008)

=== 2008 ===
- Snow White and the Seven Dwarfs (12 December 2008 - 11 January 2009)

=== 2009 ===
- Last of the Summer Wine (15 July 2009 - 8 August 2009)
