= Devonshire Park Theatre =

Theatre and former cinema in Eastbourne, England

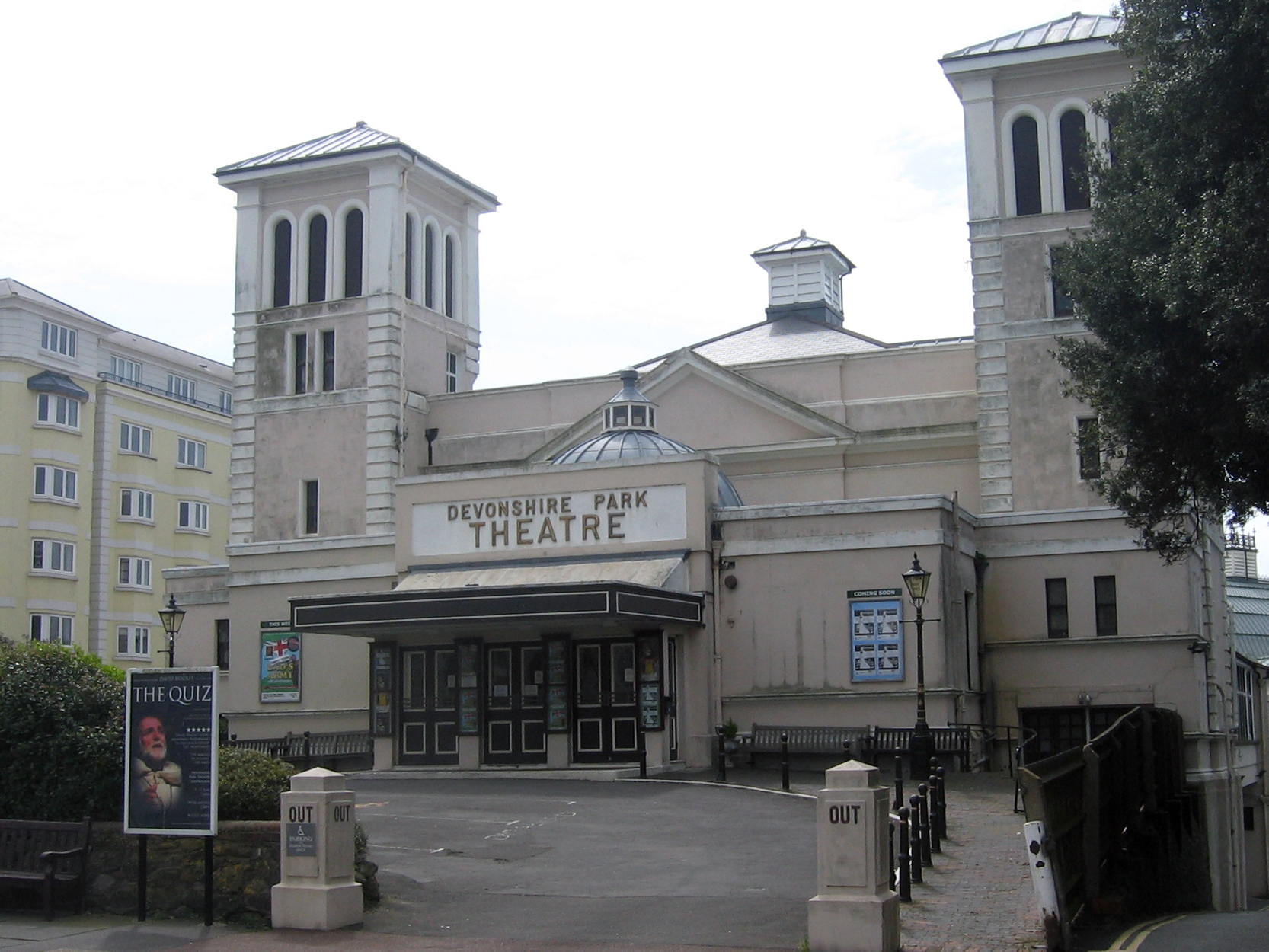
- Interactive map of Devonshire Park Theatre
- Address: 8-10 Compton St
- Location: Eastbourne BN21 4BW, UK
- Coordinates: 50.7634°N 0.2857°E
- Capacity: 936

Construction
- Opened: 1884; 142 years ago

Listed Building – Grade II
- Designated: 3 July 1981
- Reference no.: 1043618
- Architects: Henry Currey; Frank Matcham

Website
- eastbournetheatres.co.uk

The Devonshire Park Theatre is a Victorian theatre located in the town of Eastbourne, in the coastal region of East Sussex. The theatre was designed by Henry Currey and was built in 1884. In 1903, it was further improved by the theatre architect Frank Matcham. The building was designated as a Grade II listed building on 3 July 1981. The theatre has a seating capacity of 936.

== See also ==
Eastbourne Theatres
