= Joya's Fun School =

American children's television series

Joya's Fun School is a children's television series that was produced and broadcast by WPIX-TV in New York City, hosted by Joya Sherrill. After an early iteration with a different title ran from 1970 - 1971, the series aired weekly from September 13, 1971 until November 13, 1982. The cast also included Luther Henderson, Brumsic Brandon Jr. and a bookworm puppet named Seymour. The series featured stories, songs, and activities.

== Synopsis ==
Host Joya Sherrill would engage viewers in games, craft-making, hobby segments, and storytelling. There were comedy skits with the puppet Seymour the Bookworm, created and manipulated by cartoonist Brumsic Brandon, Jr., a.k.a. Mr. B.B., and songs with musical accompaniment by the show's musical director, Luther Henderson a.k.a. the Professor. The series also included informational segments and interviews with guest personalities.

== History ==
=== Development ===
In 1969, Joya Sherrill, a former vocalist with Duke Ellington's Jazz Band, suggested to her manager that she was interested in pursuing her own television program. At the time, WPIX-TV in New York City was seeking a woman to host a children's television show.

=== On-air ===
An initial iteration of the program, Time For Joya, premiered as a Sunday-morning program on February 22, 1970, and ran through September 5, 1971. On September 13, 1971 "Time For Joya" started airing weekly on Mondays at 9 a.m. through March 22, 1972. The series was turned into a 30 minute educational series. On April 7, 1972, "Time For Joya" started airing Fridays at Noon through Friday, July 28, 1972. One guest on a 1970 episode was bandleader Duke Ellington, who, in one of his final TV appearances, played music and told stories and jokes.

On August 4, 1972, the half-hour educational series name was changed to Joya's Fun School and aired Fridays at noon from August 4, 1972 to March 30, 1973, by which time it aired at 3 p.m. After a brief hiatus, it returned on Friday, April 20, though it is unclear if the episodes beginning here were new or rerun. The show taped 26 episodes per year for an unspecified duration.

It ran through at least Friday, May 22, 1981, in its original noon timeslot, and through Friday, October 1, 1982, at 2 p.m. Joya's Fun School then ran for a short time on Saturday mornings at 6 a.m., from October 9 to November 13, 1982.

After accompanying her husband to Iran in 1976, where he supervised construction of a residential complex, Sherrill produced and hosted a children's television show on one of the national networks, which broadcast in English. She recalled in 1979, after having returned to the U.S., that in Iran

Except for news, they got all their programs from the United States and England. So my live show was a big production. I told stories and made projects with the kids. Most of my fans were Iranian. I did English lessons for the Americans and Persian lessons for the Iranians.

Broadcast History

Time For Joya / Joya's Fun School on WPIX - TV 11.

Time For Joya with an audience premiered on Sunday, February 22, 1970 @ 8:15am it continued to air every Sunday at 8:15am until its last airing on Sunday, September 5, 1971.

Time For Joya premiered without an audience on Monday, September 13, 1971 at 9am and continued to air every Monday at 9am until its last Monday airing on Monday, March 27, 1972.

Time For Joya without an audience started airing on Fridays at Noon in the Magic Garden timeslot on Friday, April 7, 1972 and continued to air on Fridays at Noon until its last airing on Friday, July 28, 1972.

Joya's Fun School premiered on Friday, August 4, 1972 at Noon.

Airings

August 4, 1972 - March 23, 1973 - Fridays @ Noon

March 30, 1973 - May 4, 1973 - Fridays @ 3pm

May 11, 1973 - July 27, 1973 - Fridays @ 8am

August 3, 1973 - September 7, 1973 - Fridays @ 11:30am

September 14, 1973 - September 6, 1974 - Fridays @ 12:30pm

September 13, 1974 - November 1, 1974 - Fridays @ 8am

November 8, 1974 - July 4, 1975 - Fridays @ 10am

July 11, 1975 - August 15, 1975 - Fridays @ 2pm

August 22, 1975 - October 5, 1975 - Fridays @ Noon

October 12, 1975 - January 30, 1976 - Fridays @ 1:30pm

February 6, 1976 - October 8, 1976 - Fridays @ 2:30pm

August 27, 1976 - September 3, 1976 - Fridays @ 6:30am

October 15, 1976 - March 31, 1978 - Fridays @ 2pm

April 7, 1978 - September 5, 1980 - Fridays @ 2:30pm

September 12, 1980 - May 29, 1981 - Fridays @ Noon

September 18, 1981 - Friday @ 2:30pm

September 25, 1981 - January 22, 1982 - Fridays @ 2pm

January 29, 1982 - April 9, 1982 - Fridays @ 2:30pm

April 16, 1982 - October 1, 1982 - Fridays @ 2pm

October 9, 1982 - November 13, 1982 - Saturdays @ 6am

Source: TV Listings from the New York Daily News

== Availability ==
Some footage is available on YouTube.
