= The Pianist (album) =

Studio album by Duke Ellington
- Released: 1974
- Recorded: July 18, 1966 & January 7, 1970
- Genre: Jazz
- Length: 42:17
- Label: Fantasy
- Producer: Duke Ellington

Duke Ellington chronology
Latin American Suite (1968-70)	The Pianist (1974)	New Orleans Suite (1970)

The Pianist is a studio album by the American pianist, composer and bandleader Duke Ellington, compiled from sessions in 1966 and 1970, and released on the Fantasy Records label in 1974. Tracks one through seven were recorded at RCA Studio A in New York, NY, on July 18, 1966. Tracks eight through ten were recorded in Las Vegas, Nevada, on January 7, 1970.

== Reception ==
Professional ratings
Review scores
Source	Rating
AllMusic	3/5 stars
The Rolling Stone Jazz Record Guide	3/5 stars

The AllMusic review by Scott Yanow stated: "Duke Ellington had so many talents (composer, arranger, bandleader, personality) that his skills as a pianist could easily be overlooked. Fortunately he did record a fair amount of trio albums through the years so there is plenty of evidence as to his unique style which was both modern and traditional at the same time."

== Track listing ==
All music is composed by Duke Ellington.

No.	Title	Length
1.	"Don Juan"	2:36
2.	"Slow Blues"	4:00
3.	"Looking Glass"	2:55
4.	"The Shepherd [Take 1]"	5:50
5.	"The Shepherd" [Take 2]"	6:35
6.	"Tap Dancer's Blues"	2:53
7.	"Sam Woodyard's Blues"	6:37
8.	"Duck Amok"	3:43
9.	"Never Stop Remembering Bill"	4:29
10.	"Fat Mess"	2:58

== Personnel ==
- Duke Ellington – piano
- John Lamb (tracks 1–7), Paul Kondziela (tracks 8–10), Victor Gaskin (tracks 8–10) – bass
- Sam Woodyard (tracks 1–7), Rufus Jones (tracks 8–10) – drums
