= Joya Sherrill Sings Duke =

1965 studio album by Joya Sherrill

Studio album by Joya Sherrill
- Released: 1965
- Recorded: January 12 & 20, 1965
- Genre: Jazz
- Length: 43:16
- Label: 20th Century Fox TFM-3170

Joya Sherrill chronology
Sugar and Spice (1962)	Joya Sherrill Sings Duke (1965)	Black Beauty, the Duke in Mind (1994)

Joya Sherrill Sings Duke is a 1965 album by Joya Sherrill recorded in tribute to the bandleader and composer Duke Ellington. Several members of the Duke Ellington Orchestra accompany Sherrill on the album.

== Reception ==
Professional ratings
Review scores
Source	Rating
AllMusic	4/5 stars

The album was reviewed for AllMusic by Ken Dryden, who wrote: "Sherrill's confidence singing the twelve gems from the band repertoire allows her to let the timelessness of the music and lyrics speak for itself rather than overembelish the songs". Dryden also praised the solos of Johnny Hodges on "Prelude to a Kiss", Ray Nance on "I'm Beginning to See the Light" and Nance on "Day Dream".

== Track listing ==
1. "Mood Indigo" (Barney Bigard, Duke Ellington, Irving Mills) – 2:17
2. "Prelude to a Kiss" (D. Ellington, Irving Gordon, Mills) – 3:49
3. "I'm Beginning to See the Light" (D. Ellington, Don George, Johnny Hodges, Harry James) – 1:56
4. "Sophisticated Lady" (D. Ellington, Mills, Mitchell Parish) – 2:50
5. "Kissing Bug" (Joya Sherrill, Rex Stewart, Billy Strayhorn) – 1:49
6. "In a Sentimental Mood" (D. Ellington, Manny Kurtz, Mills) – 2:23
7. "Duke's Place" (D. Ellington, Bob Katz, Bob Thiele) – 2:36
8. "I'm Just a Lucky So-and-So" (Mack David, D. Ellington) – 2:51
9. "Day Dream" (D. Ellington, John La Touche, Strayhorn) – 3:54
10. "Things Ain't What They Used to Be" (Mercer Ellington, Ted Persons) – 3:32
11. "Just Squeeze Me (But Please Don't Tease Me)" (D. Ellington, Lee Gaines) – 2:48
12. "A Flower Is a Lovesome Thing" (Strayhorn) – 2:52

Recorded January 12 (tracks 1–2, 4–7, 10–11) & January 20, 1965 (tracks 3, 8– 9, 12). "I'm Beginning to See the Light" was recorded at both sessions.

== Personnel ==
- Joya Sherrill – vocals
- Johnny Hodges – alto saxophone (tracks 1–7, 10–11)
- Ray Nance – trumpet, violin (tracks 3, 8– 9, 12)
- Paul Gonsalves – tenor saxophone (tracks 1–7, 10–11)
- Cootie Williams – trumpet (tracks 1–7, 10–11)
- Ernie Harper (tracks 1–7, 10–11), Billy Strayhorn (tracks 3, 8– 9, 12) – piano
- John Lamb (tracks 1–7, 10–11), Joe Benjamin (tracks 3, 8–9, 12) – double bass
- Sam Woodyard (tracks 1–7, 10–11), Shep Shepherd (tracks 3, 8–9, 12) – drums
- Mercer Ellington – conductor, liner notes
- David Frankel – design
