= Joya Sherrill =

American jazz singer and TV show host (1924–2010)

- Born: August 20, 1924; Bayonne, New Jersey, U.S.
- Died: June 28, 2010 (aged 85); Great Neck, New York, U.S.
- Education: Wilberforce University
- Occupations: Vocalist; TV show host
- Television: Joya's Fun School
- Spouse: Richard Guilmenot (died 1989)
- Children: 2
- Musical career
- Genre: Jazz
- Labels: Columbia; 20th Century Fox; Phontastic
- Formerly of: Duke Ellington

Joya Sherrill (August 20, 1924 – June 28, 2010) was an American jazz vocalist and children's television show host.

== Biography ==
Sherrill was born in Bayonne, New Jersey, on August 20, 1924. Her first ambition was to become a writer: she was the editor of her school paper. She had a sister, Alice.

Sherrill began her career with Duke Ellington in July 1942 when she was 17 years old. After a period at Wilberforce University, she rejoined in 1944 and remained with Ellington until 1946, when she left to marry Richard Guilmenot. Ellington considered her one of his favorite singers. "I never really left the band. I did recordings and special occasions. Duke would call me for jobs once a year at least", Sherrill told John S. Wilson in 1979. Sherrill also performed with Ellingtonians Ray Nance and Rex Stewart for many years. She worked with Ellington on the television broadcast of A Drum Is a Woman (1957) and toured the USSR with Benny Goodman in 1962. The 1965 album Joya Sherrill Sings Duke features Ellingtonians performing in support.

From 1970, Sherrill hosted a children's television show, Time for Joya, later called Joya's Fun School. This was recorded for a few years, but was rerun until 1982. In the mid-1970s, she accompanied her husband when he went to Iran for his work. There, she had her own television program, which was broadcast live. She returned to singing in New York near the end of that decade.

Her husband died in 1989; they had a son and a daughter. Sherrill died from leukemia at her home in Great Neck, New York, on June 28, 2010.

== Discography ==
=== As leader ===
- Sugar and Spice with Luther Henderson (Columbia, 1962)
- Joya Sherrill Sings Duke (20th Century Fox, 1965)
- Black Beauty: The Duke in Mind with Arne Domnérus (Phontastic, 1995)

=== As guest ===
- Sammy Davis Jr., Sammy Jumps with Joya (Design, 1957)
- Duke Ellington, Duke Ellington's Greatest (RCA Victor, 1954)
- Duke Ellington, My People (Contact, 1964)
