= Live at the Whitney =

Live album by Duke Ellington
- Released: 1995
- Recorded: April 10, 1972
- Genre: Jazz
- Label: Impulse!

Duke Ellington chronology
Togo Brava Suite (1971)	Live at the Whitney (1995)	The Ellington Suites (1959–72)

Live at the Whitney is a live album by the American pianist, composer and bandleader Duke Ellington, recorded at the Whitney Museum of American Art in 1972 and released on the Impulse! label in 1995.

== Reception ==
The AllMusic review by Scott Yanow stated: "Although Duke apparently planned very little in advance, his program is a well-rounded set of old standards and newer (and more obscure) works. A week short of his 73rd birthday, Ellington's fingers sound a little rusty in spots, but he clearly gets stronger as the concert progresses".

Professional ratings
Review scores
Source	Rating
AllMusic	3/5 stars
The Penguin Guide to Jazz Recordings	2.5/4 stars

== Track listing ==
All compositions by Duke Ellington except as indicated

1. Opening Remarks - 1:06
2. "Medley: Black and Tan Fantasy/Prelude to a Kiss/Do Nothing till You Hear from Me/Caravan" (Ellington, James "Bubber" Miley/ Ellington Irving Mills/Ellington, Bob Russell/Juan Tizol) - 6:51
3. "Meditation" - 2:39
4. "A Mural from Two Perspectives" - 2:56
5. "Sophisticated Lady/Solitude" (Ellington, Mills/Ellington, Mills, Eddie DeLange) - 4:44
6. "Soda Fountain Rag" - 1:18
7. "New World A-Comin'" - 9:02
8. "Amour, Amour" - 1:41
9. "Soul Soothing Beach" - 2:51
10. "Lotus Blossom" (Billy Strayhorn) - 2:35
11. "Flamingo" (Edmund Anderson, Ted Grouya) - 1:35
12. "Le Sucrier Velours" - 1:44
13. "The Night Shepherd" - 2:45
14. "C Jam Blues" (Barney Bigard, Ellington) - 3:04
15. "Mood Indigo" (Bigard, Ellington, Mills) - 2:06
16. "I'm Beginning to See the Light" (Ellington, Don George, Johnny Hodges, Harry James) - 1:23
17. "Dancers in Love" - 2:13
18. "Kixx" - 1:35
19. "Satin Doll" (Ellington, Strayhorn) - 3:07

- Recorded at the Whitney Museum of American Art in New York on April 10, 1972.

== Personnel ==
- Duke Ellington – piano
- Joe Benjamin – bass
- Rufus Jones – drums
