= Orchestral Works =

Studio album by Duke Ellington
- Released: 1970
- Recorded: May 28, 1970
- Genre: Jazz
- Label: Decca

Duke Ellington chronology
New Orleans Suite (1970)	Orchestral Works (1970)	The Suites, New York 1968 & 1970 (1968-70)

Orchestral Works is an album by American pianist, composer and bandleader Duke Ellington with the Cincinnati Symphony Orchestra conducted by Erich Kunzel, recorded and released on the Decca label in 1970.

== Reception ==
Professional ratings
Review scores
Source	Rating
Allmusic	2/5 stars

The Allmusic review by Scott Yanow awarded the album 2 stars and stated: "the arrangements... are fine but one misses his [Ellington's] illustrious orchestra. Interesting but not essential music."

== Track listing ==
All compositions by Duke Ellington

1. Poetic Commentary "A" – 1:43
2. "New World A-Comin'" – 11:20
3. Poetic Commentary "B" – 2:36
4. "Harlem/The Golden Broom and The Green Apple" – 14:14
5. Poetic Commentary "C" – 1:32
6. "Stanza 1: The Golden Broom" – 10:18
7. Poetic Commentary "D" – 1:20
8. "Stanza 2: The Green Apple" – 4:30
9. Poetic Commentary "E" – 1:32
10. "Stanza 3: The Handsome Traffic Policeman" – 5:57

- Recorded May 28, 1970 in Cincinnati, Ohio.

== Personnel ==
- Duke Ellington – piano
- The Cincinnati Symphony Orchestra, Erich Kunzel – conductor
