= Blood Count =

1967 jazz composition by Billy Strayhorn

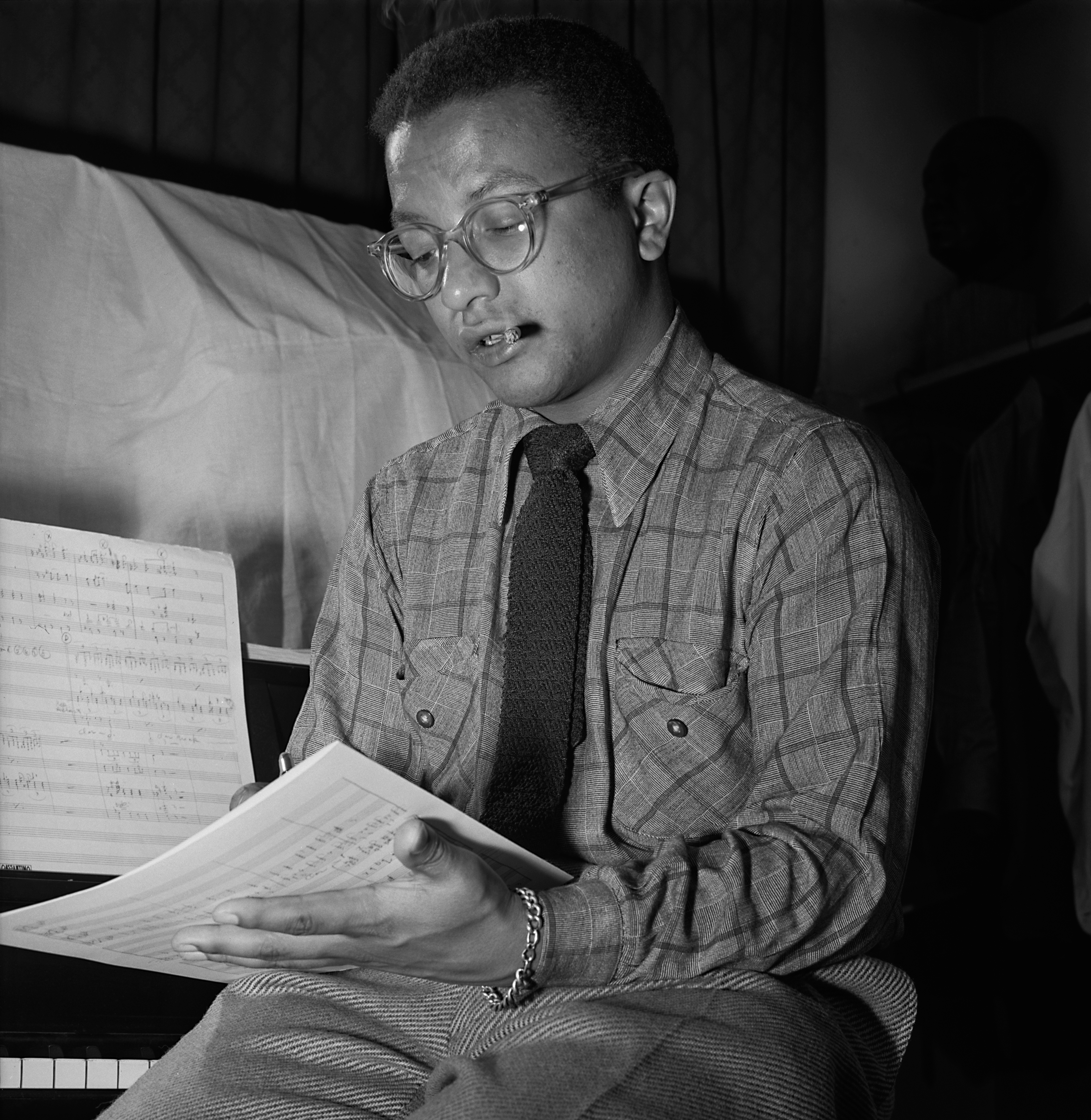
Billy Strayhorn, c. 1947

"Blood Count" is a 1967 jazz composition by pianist, arranger, and composer Billy Strayhorn.

== Background ==
The piece was originally called "Blue Cloud" and intended to be the first movement of a three-part work Strayhorn was writing for Duke Ellington to be titled The North by Northwest Suite. The other two movements, never completed, were to be called "Pavane" and "Up There".

Strayhorn was hospitalized in 1967 due to esophageal cancer, which is associated with the consumption of alcohol and tobacco, both of which he had used heavily. He finished the piece while in the hospital, where he had been put on a liquid diet and dwindled to just 80 pounds.

Strayhorn died on 31 May, and "Blood Count" was his last completed composition. It was his second piece with a medical theme, following "Upper Manhattan Medical Group" (aka "UMMG"), which he had composed in the early 1950s.

== Structure ==
"Blood Count" was written in the key of D minor and has an AABAC form, with slight differences among the "A" sections. The "A" sections consist of two parts: four bars of altered dominants underlining a rhythmically free two-bar phrase and then a D minor pedal point with a chromatically moving fifth degree. In the "B" section, a two-bar phrase is played on G6, Gm6, and Fmaj7. Strayhorn modulates back to "A" with a characteristic device, half-note chromatically ascending dominant chords with a 13 as the melody note for each one. The "C" section is a coda that fades out as triads move downward chromatically on top of an A pedal, ending on Dm.

Strayhorn's biographer, David Hajdu, describes the piece as "a wrenching moan, its pedal-point bass evoking the rhythmic drip of intravenous fluid."

== Recordings ==
The Ellington orchestra debuted "Blood Count" at a Carnegie Hall concert in March 1967; this was later released by Pablo Records in 1975 as The Greatest Jazz Concert in the World. In August 1967, Ellington recorded the piece on his tribute album for Strayhorn, ...And His Mother Called Him Bill. Ellington biographer John Edward Hasse maintains that this recording is one of Johnny Hodges's "supreme performances ... an intense and anguished dirge".

Although Ellington never played "Blood Count" again after the recording session, many other artists have since recorded it, notably Stan Getz, who made seven recordings, including on the albums Pure Getz (1982) and Anniversary! (1987) with Kenny Barron. Getz said of the piece, "I have a special affinity with Billy Strayhorn. I think about Strayhorn when I play the song. You can hear him dying." Getz biographer Dave Gelly writes of the initial 1982 recording:

He read the lead sheet through once and recorded it straight away, in one take. It turned out to be one of the finest single pieces among his recorded work. Getz's ability to grasp the essence of a piece instantly has been remarked on before, but his rendition of "Blood Count" goes beyond exceptional musical intelligence. There is something almost supernatural in the way he shapes the phrases and turns them to catch the light.

Other notable recordings of the piece, which has gone on to become a jazz standard, include:

- Jimmy Rowles (1981)
- Marian McPartland (1985)
- Art Farmer (1987)
- Bobby Watson (1988)
- Hank Jones (1990)
- Joe Henderson (1992)
- Charles Lloyd (2002)
- Vijay Iyer (2015)

In 2002, Elvis Costello wrote lyrics for the piece and retitled it "My Flame Burns Blue".

"Blood Count" was part of the repertoire for the 2013 Essentially Ellington competition.
