= Luther Henderson =

American arranger and composer (1919–2003)

Background information
- Born: Luther Lincoln Henderson Jr. March 14, 1919; Kansas City, Missouri, U.S.
- Died: July 29, 2003 (aged 84) New York City
- Genres: Jazz; orchestral jazz; big band
- Occupations: Composer; arranger; orchestrator
- Instrument: Piano
- Years active: 1942–2000

Luther Henderson (March 14, 1919 – July 29, 2003) was an American arranger, composer, orchestrator, and pianist best known for his contributions to Broadway musicals.

== Early life and career ==
Born in Kansas City, Missouri, Henderson relocated to the Sugar Hill section of Harlem at the age of four. Following a short stint studying mathematics at the City College of New York, he enrolled at the Juilliard School of Music, where he received a Bachelor of Science degree in 1942.

Drafted into the Navy during World War II, Henderson became an arranger for the Navy band stationed at the Naval Station Great Lakes, prior to becoming the staff orchestrator for The U. S. Navy School of Music in Washington, D.C., from 1944 to 1946.

Following the war, Henderson began a long professional association with a number of musical notables of the era, including Duke Ellington, Lena Horne, Jule Styne, and Richard Rodgers. Notably, Henderson maintained a lengthy pre-professional relationship with Ellington, having been neighbors with the Ellington family as a child and schoolmate with his son, Mercer. Henderson went on to serve as classical orchestrator for Ellington's symphonic works, receiving the nickname of being Ellington's "classical arm."

== Broadway ==
Henderson's first foray into Broadway theatre was Ellington's Beggar's Holiday, serving as co-orchestrator alongside Billy Strayhorn. He went on to serve as orchestrator, arranger, and musical director on more than fifty Broadway musicals, including Lena Horne: The Lady and Her Music, That's Entertainment, Flower Drum Song, Funny Girl, No, No Nanette, Purlie, Ain't Misbehavin' and Jelly's Last Jam. Henderson also did the music along with Buster Davis for the 1975 Broadway musical Doctor Jazz.

Henderson additionally made his Broadway songwriting debut with Jelly's Last Jam, receiving a 1992 Tony Award nomination for Best Original Score, alongside lyricist Susan Birkenhead.

== Other works ==
From the 1950s on, Henderson also worked extensively in television, including The Ed Sullivan Show, The Bell Telephone Hour, and specials for Dean Martin, Carol Burnett, Andy Williams, and Victor Borge. He was nominated for an Emmy Award for his work on the television presentation of Ain't Misbehavin.

Henderson served as musical director for actress Polly Bergen and Victor Borge; and arranged music for many popular singers, including Lesley Gore, Robert Goulet, Nancy Wilson, Ben Vereen, Sandler and Young, Leslie Uggams, Eartha Kitt, Diahann Carroll, Dinah Shore, Eileen Farrell, Juliet Prowse, and Liza Minnelli. He performed as "The Professor" on the children's television show Joya's Fun School.

Henderson's arrangements of Ellington's music were recorded in 1999 by the City of Birmingham Symphony Orchestra. The recording was titled Classic Ellington. A year later, the work was performed at Carnegie Hall by the St. Luke's Orchestra. The performance featured jazz musicians Clark Terry, Dianne Reeves and Regina Carter.

Over the course of two decades, Henderson arranged over a hundred pieces for the Canadian Brass. The group's album of Ellington's music, Take the "A" Train, was nominated for a Grammy Award in 2000. Henderson also recorded six albums as the leader of the Luther Henderson Orchestra.

== Awards and recognition ==
Henderson was twice nominated for Broadway's Tony Award: in 1992 for Best Original Score for Jelly's Last Jam, and in 1997 for Best Orchestrations for Play On!. He received the Drama Desk Award for Outstanding Orchestrations for his work on Jelly's Last Jam. Other recognitions include the 2002 AUDELCO Pioneer Award, awarded alongside his wife, actress Billie Allen. He received a posthumous Jazz Masters Award from the National Endowment for the Arts in 2004. In 2008 Juilliard School of Music, Henderson's alma mater, established the Luther Henderson Scholarship Fund.

== Death ==
Following a long battle with cancer, Henderson died on July 29, 2003, at the age of 84. He was survived by his wife, actress Billie Allen, three children including The Electric Company actress Melanie Henderson, Denson B. Henderson, and Dr. Luther L. Henderson III, professor of music and humanities at Los Angeles City College, two step-children, two grandchildren, one step-grandchild, and one great-grandchild.
