= Barrie Lee Hall Jr. =

American jazz musician

Barrie Lee Hall Jr. (June 30, 1949 – January 24, 2011) was an American trumpeter, music director, and band leader of the Duke Ellington Small Band. He was known for his use of the plunger mute to affect the tone of his trumpet.

== Early life ==
Born in Mansfield, Louisiana, Hall attended Crispus Attucks middle school and Worthing High School. In his biography, he relates that Sammy D. Harris, the high school band director, "pointed a few of us in the direction of jazz." At Texas Southern University he studied piano and trumpet and won soloist awards in big-band competitions. Arnett Cobb soon after discovered him and took him to see Duke Ellington. When the two were introduced, Ellington asked, "How come you're not playing in my band?"

== Career with Ellington ==
Hall joined the Duke Ellington Orchestra on June 8, 1973. After Ellington died the following year, Hall continued to play with the band under the direction Ellington's son, Mercer Ellington. After Mercer Ellington died in 1996, Hall conducted the Duke Ellington Orchestra for one year after and remained the replacement director when Paul Ellington was unable to perform. During his time with Mercer Ellington, Hall was given Cootie Williams's last trumpet by Williams himself before he died and was known as the inheritor of Williams's style of playing.

== Other activities ==
Later in life, Hall was music director at Liberty Baptist Church. With a background in gospel music, he was able to lead the Duke Ellington's Third Sacred Concert in 2001, in which he performed as bandleader with a two hundred-voice choir. Wishing to see more of Ellington's works performed in churches, he brought performances to Yugoslavia to an audience of three thousand in a cathedral, with the music broadcast to an audience of ten thousand people outside the church.

In the last six years of his life, Hall traveled to Switzerland every April and was a guest soloist with a big band made up of musicians from the United States which included Shelley Carrol and Randy Brecker. During the last year of his life, he conducted the youth orchestra.

== Projects for the Ellington Orchestra ==
- Orchestrator/arranger for the Broadway musical Sophisticated Ladies
- Orchestrator/arranger for the jazz opera Queenie Pie
- Orchestrator/arranger for the television production of The Duke Ellington Special on PBS. Trumpet and voice duet of the song "Creole Love Call" with Hall playing trumpet and opera star Kathleen Battle singing

== Other projects ==
- Arrangements for Gregory Hines, Maurice Hines, Vivian Reed, Melba Moore, Phyllis Hyman, Judith Jamison, and Maureen McGovern
- Arranger and guest soloist with the Danish Radio Orchestra
- Guest soloist with the Rochester Philharmonic Orchestra
- Music director of the touring company for Sophisticated Ladies starring Mary Wilson of the Supremes
- Orchestrations for the Seattle Symphony

== Discography ==
=== As a leader ===
- The Duke Ellington Small Band (M&N, 2006)

=== As sideman ===
With Mercer Ellington

- Continuum
- Take the Holiday Train
- Hot and Bothered
- Digital Duke
- Music Is My Mistress
- The Cotton Connection

With Duke Ellington

- Duke Ellington's Third Sacred Concert
- Only God Can Make a Tree

With Sebastian Whittaker

- Searching for the Truth
- One for Bu

With others

- Sophisticated Ladies: The Cast Album
- The Lady, Anita Moore
- Echoes of Harlem, John Dankworth and the Rochester Philharmonic
- In My Solitude, John Dankworth and Cleo Laine
