= Herbie Jones =

American jazz trumpeter and arranger (1926–2001)

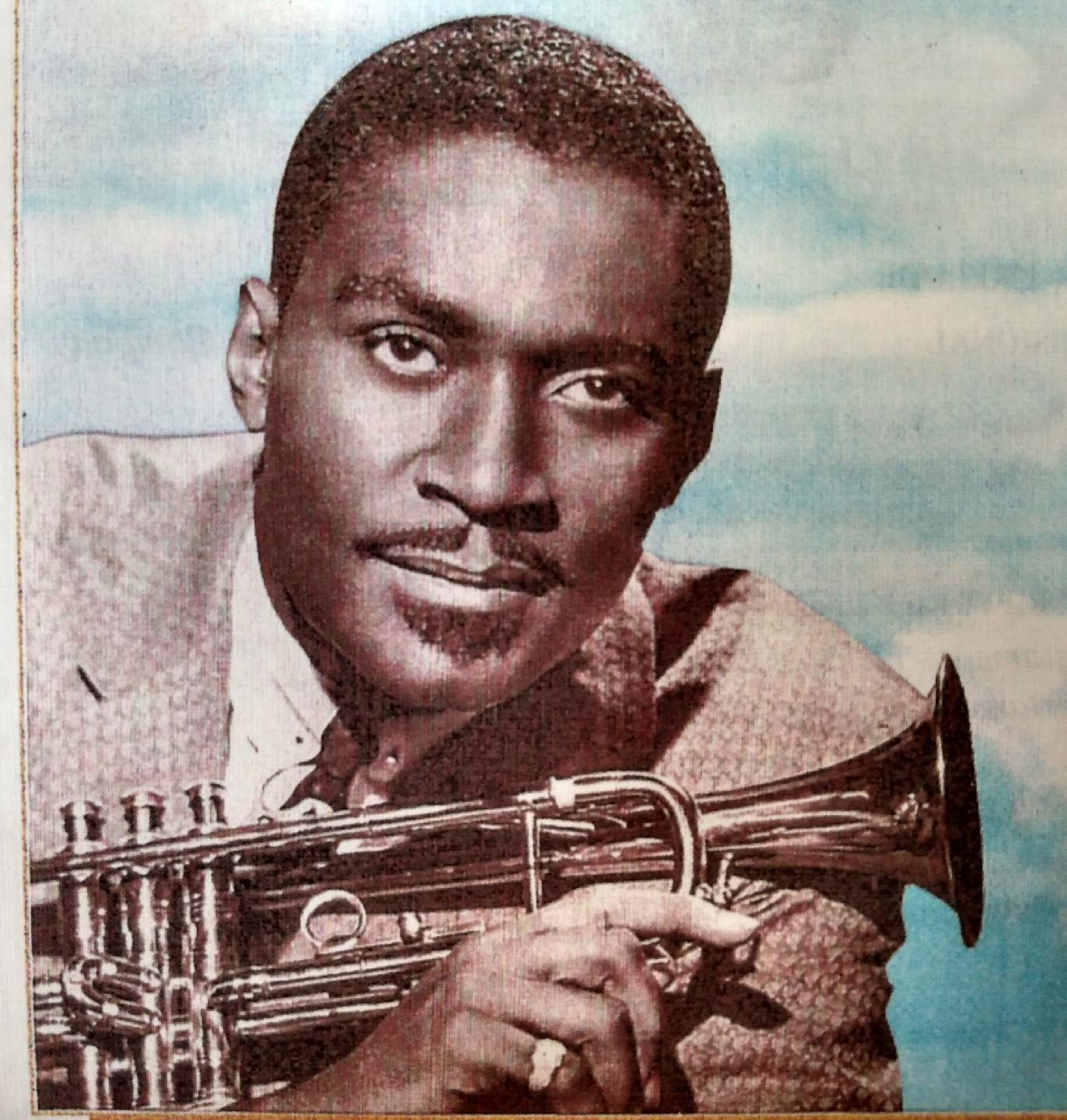

Background information
- Born: Herbert Robert Jones; 23 March 1926; Miami
- Died: 19 March 2001 (aged 74) New York City
- Genres: Jazz
- Occupations: trumpeter arranger
- Instruments: Trumpet

Herbie Jones (born Herbert Robert Jones) (March 23, 1926, Miami, Florida – March 19, 2001, New York City) was an American jazz trumpeter and arranger.

Jones dropped out of college to move to New York, where he joined the Lucky Millinder band. In subsequent years he worked with Andy Kirk, Buddy Johnson, and Cab Calloway, and studied under Eddie Barefield. Jones spent several years as Duke Ellington's first trumpeter in the 1960s, and worked as an arranger and transcriber with Ellington and Billy Strayhorn. Among his arrangements were "El Busto", "Cootie's Caravan", "The Prowling Cat", and "The Opener".

After leaving Ellington, Jones became director of an alternative school in New York, and directed the Police Athletic League's bugle corps. He died as a result of complications from diabetes in March 2001.

== Discography ==
=== As sideman ===
With Duke Ellington

- Plays with the Original Motion Picture Score Mary Poppins (Reprise, 1964)
- Ellington '65 (Reprise, 1964)
- Concert in the Virgin Islands (Reprise, 1965)
- Duke Ellington's Concert of Sacred Music (RCA Victor, 1966)
- The Popular Duke Ellington (RCA Victor, 1966)
- The Far East Suite (RCA Victor, 1967)
- Antibes Concert Vol. 1 (Verve, 1967)
- ...And His Mother Called Him Bill (RCA, 1968)
- Francis A. & Edward K. (Reprise, 1968)
- Second Sacred Concert (Fantasy, 1968)
- Yale Concert (Fantasy, 1973)
- Harlem (Pablo, 1985)
- All Star Road Band Volume 2 (Doctor Jazz, 1985)

With others

- Ella Fitzgerald & Duke Ellington, Ella at Duke's Place (Verve, 1966)
- Ella Fitzgerald & Duke Ellington, The Stockholm Concert 1966 (Pablo, 1984)
- Johnny Hodges, Everybody Knows (Impulse!, 1964)
