= Geezil Minerve =

American jazz saxophonist and flautist (1922–1992)

Harold "Geezil" Minerve (January 3, 1922 – June 4, 1992) was an American jazz alto saxophonist and flautist.

Minerve was born in Cuba and raised in Florida, and began playing music at age 12. He played with Ida Cox early in his career, then worked as a freelance musician in New Orleans. Following stints with Clarence Love and Ernie Fields, Minerve served in the Army from 1943–46, then returned to play with Fields for a short time. He worked with Buddy Johnson from 1949-1957, then with Mercer Ellington (1960), Ray Charles (1962–64), and Arthur Prysock. In 1971 he joined the Duke Ellington Orchestra, filling Johnny Hodges's spot after Hodges's death. Minerve remained with the Ellington Orchestra until 1974, then returned to play with Mercer Ellington. He remained with the Duke Ellington orchestra under direction of Mercer Ellington (Duke's son). Following the success of the Broadway hit "Sophisticated Lady" when he played with the orchestra on stage and the touring company, he left the orchestra for a brief time with Ruth Brown's Black and Blue Review in Paris returning to Ellington in the 80's He did further freelance work later in the 1970s.
