= Norris Turney =

American saxophonist and flautist (1921–2001)

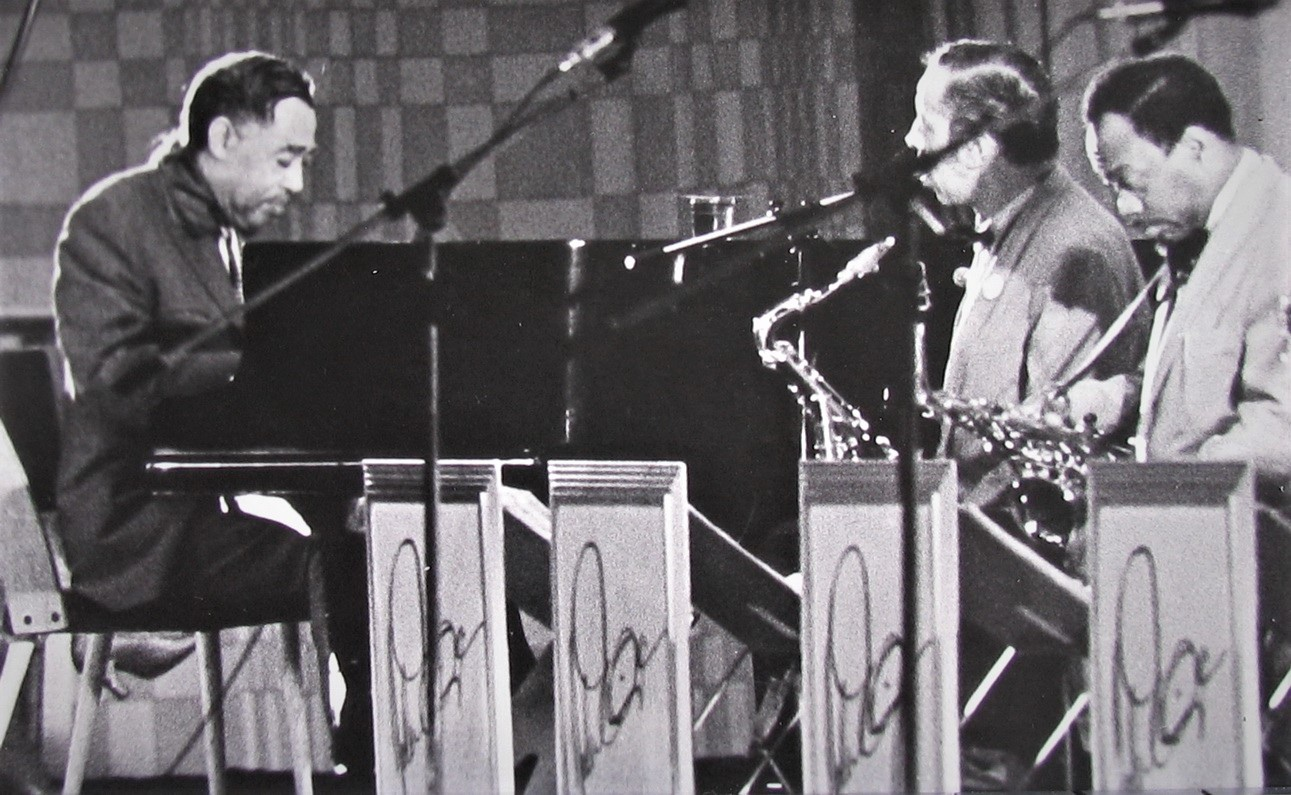
- Turney with the Duke Ellington orchestra on tour in the Soviet Union, 1971

Background information
- Born: Norris William Turney; September 8, 1921; Wilmington, Ohio, U.S.
- Died: January 17, 2001 (aged 79) Kettering, Ohio, U.S.
- Genres: Jazz; swing
- Occupation: Musician
- Instruments: Alto saxophone; flute; tenor saxophone
- Years active: 1939–1997
- Labels: Master Jazz; Black & Blue; Mapleshade
- Formerly of: Jeter–Pillars Orchestra; Tiny Bradshaw; Billy Eckstine; Ray Charles; Duke Ellington; Savoy Sultans; Oliver Jackson Quintet

Norris William Turney (September 8, 1921 – January 17, 2001) was an American jazz saxophonist and flautist.

== Biography ==
Turney was born in Wilmington, Ohio, on September 8, 1921. He began his career in the Midwest, playing in territory bands including the Jeter–Pillars Orchestra. He performed with Tiny Bradshaw in Chicago before moving to New York City, where he played with the Billy Eckstine orchestra from 1945 to 1946. Turney had little luck in New York, however, and returned to Ohio to play in local ensembles through the 1950s. He toured with Ray Charles in 1967, traveling to the Far East and Australia, and then was hired by Duke Ellington, in whose orchestra he played from 1969 to 1973. He was hired to play alto saxophone as an "insurance policy" due to the declining health of lead altoist Johnny Hodges. Turney was the first flute soloist to ever play in Ellington's orchestra, while also occasionally playing tenor saxophone in the band. Amongst his own compositions was "Chequered Hat", written in tribute to Hodges.

Following his tenure with Ellington, he played with the Savoy Sultans and the Newport All-Stars, as well as in several pit orchestras. In the 1980s, he toured and recorded as a member of the Oliver Jackson Quintet, with Ali Jackson, Irvin Stokes, and Claude Black.

Turney recorded as a leader between 1975 and 1978 and released the CD Big, Sweet 'n Blue in 1993.

He died of kidney failure on January 17, 2001, aged 79, in Kettering, Ohio.

== Discography ==
=== As leader ===
- I Let a Song (1978) – with Booty Wood, Aaron Bell, Sam Woodyard, and Raymond Fol
- Big, Sweet 'n Blue (Mapleshade, 1993) – with Larry Willis, Walter Booker, and Jimmy Cobb

=== As sideman ===
With Jodie Christian

- Front Line (Delmark, 1996)

With Roy Eldridge

- What It's All About (Pablo, 1976)

With Oliver Jackson

- Billy's Bounce (Black & Blue, 1984)

With Red Richards

- In a Mellow Tone (West 54, 1979)

With Randy Weston

- Tanjah (Polydor, 1974)
