= Money Johnson =

American jazz trumpeter (1918–1978)

Harold "Money" Johnson (February 23, 1918 – March 28, 1978) was an American jazz trumpeter.

== Early life ==
Johnson was born in Tyler, Texas, on February 23, 1918. He first played trumpet at age 15. Primarily a trumpeter, he also recorded with the trombone in a few instances and subsequently the flugelhorn and flute, respectively.

== Later life and career ==
He moved to Oklahoma City in 1936 and jammed with Charlie Christian and Henry Bridges before joining Nat Towles's band. He played with Horace Henderson and Bob Dorsey before returning to Towles's band in 1944 in Chicago. He also played with Count Basie, Cootie Williams, Lucky Millinder, and Bull Moose Jackson in the 1940s. His associations in the 1950s included Louis Jordan (1951), Lucky Thompson (1953), Sy Oliver, Buddy Johnson, Cozy Cole, Mercer Ellington, Little Esther (1956), and Panama Francis (for performances in Uruguay in 1953).

In the 1960s Johnson played in the house band at the Apollo Theater in New York, and recorded with King Curtis in 1962. He toured the USSR with Earl Hines in 1966. From 1968 he played in the Duke Ellington Orchestra and also worked again with Hines and Oliver. He recorded with Buck Clayton in 1975. Johnson's last performance was on the night before he died of a heart attack, which was on March 28, 1978, in New York City.

== Discography ==
Year of release, rather than recording is indicated.

With Pearl Bailey

- 1944–1947 (Classics, 2002)
- Takes Two To Tango (ASV/Living Era, 2004)

With Cozy Cole

- Cozy Cole/Savina (Love, 2005)

With Buck Clayton

- Buck Clayton Jam Session (Chiaroscuro, 1975)

With King Curtis

- Blow Man, Blow! (Bear Family, 1992)

With Duke Ellington

- Second Sacred Concert (Prestige, 1968)
- New Orleans Suite (Atlantic, 1970)
- The Afro-Eurasian Eclipse (Original Jazz Classics, 1971)
- Up In Duke's Workshop (Original Jazz Classics, 1972)
- The Ellington Suites: The Queen's Suite/The Goutelas Suite/The Uwis Suite (Pablo/Original Jazz Classics, released 1976)
- The Intimate Ellington (Concord, 1977)
- Private Collection, Vol. 9: Studio Sessions, New York (Saja, 1989)
- Private Collection, Vol. 10 (Saja, 1989)
- Never Before Released Recordings 1965–1972 (Musicmasters, 1991)
- Cool Rock (Laserlight, 1992)
- Berlin '65/Paris '67 (Pablo, 1997)
- Togo Brava Suite (Storyville, 2001)
- Live & Rare (Bluebird RCA, 2002)
- Rugged Jungle (Lost Secret, 2004)
- New York, NY (Storyville, 2008)
- Live in Warsaw October 30, 1971 (Gambit, 2009)
- Last Trip To Paris: Nov 14 1973 (City Hall, 2013)
- Mara Gold (Squatty Roo, 2014)

With Duke Ellington Orchestra / Mercer Ellington

- Continuum (Fantasy, 1975)

With Louis Jordan

- Let the Good Times Roll (Imports, 1992)
- Let The Good Times Roll: The Anthology 1938–1953 (MCA, 1999)

With Barbara Lewis

- Hello Stranger: The Best of Barbara Lewis (Rhino, 1994)

With Jack McDuff

- A Change Is Gonna Come/Double Barrelled Soul (Atlantic, 1966)

With Bull Moose Jackson

- 1945–1947 (Classics, 2003)

With Lucky Millinder

- Back Beats (Pearl, 1996)
- 1943–1947 (Classics, 1999)

With Houston Person

- Houston Express (Prestige, 1970)
- Legends Of Acid Jazz (Prestige, 1996)

With Red Prysock

- Swingsation (Verve, 1999)

With Jesse Stone

- Jesse Stone Alias Charles "Chuck" Calhoun (Bear Family, 1996)

With Lucky Thompson

- Lucky Moments (Ocium, 2003)

With Eddie "Cleanhead" Vinson

- Primary Cuts, Vol. 1 (Catfish, 2000)

With Cootie Williams and His Orchestra

- 1945–1946 (Classics, 1999)
- Big Bands At The Savoy (and Luis Russell, Allegro, 1999)
