= Harold Ashby =

American jazz saxophonist (1925–2003)

- Born: March 27, 1925; Kansas City, Missouri, U.S.
- Died: June 7, 2003 (aged 78) New York City, U.S.
- Genre: Jazz
- Occupation: Musician
- Instrument: Tenor saxophone
- Labels: Columbia; Metronome; Black & Blue; Progressive; Stash; Gemini; Criss Cross Jazz; Timeless; Mapleshade
- Formerly of: Duke Ellington

Harold Ashby (March 27, 1925, in Kansas City, Missouri – June 13, 2003, in New York City) was an American jazz tenor saxophonist. He worked with Duke Ellington's orchestra, replacing Jimmy Hamilton in 1968. In 1959, he recorded backing Willie Dixon on the latter's first album, Willie's Blues.

After leaving the Duke Ellington orchestra in 1975, Ashby worked as a freelance musician and took part in various reunions of Ellington alumni, as well as recording and gigging with his own bands.

Ashby suffered a heart attack in May 2003 and was hospitalized before dying at the age of 78, on June 13 that year.

== Discography ==
=== As leader ===
- Born to Swing: Introducing the Compulsive Tenor Saxophone of Harold Ashby (Columbia, 1960)
- Tenor Stuff with Paul Gonsalves (Metronome, 1961)
- Scufflin' (Black & Blue, 1978)
- Presenting Harold Ashby (Progressive, 1981)
- I'm Old Fashioned (Stash, 1991)
- The Viking (Gemini, 1991)
- What Am I Here For? with Mulgrew Miller, Rufus Reid, Ben Riley (Criss Cross, 1992)
- On the Sunny Side of the Street (Timeless, 1992)
- Out of Nowhere with Wild Bill Davis (Black & Blue, 1993)
- Just for You (Mapleshade)

=== As sideman ===
- Eugenie Baird, Eugenie Baird Sings, Duke's Boys Play Ellington (Stereo Spectrum, Design 1959)
- Lawrence Brown, Inspired Abandon (Impulse!, 1965) – with Johnny Hodges
- Benny Golson, Tenor Legacy (Arkadia Jazz, 1998)
- Scott Hamilton, Skyscrapers (Concord Jazz, 1980)
- Earl Hines, Once Upon a Time (Impulse!, 1966)
- Milt Hinton, Laughing at Life (Columbia, 1994)
- Butch Miles, Butch's Encore (Famous Door, 1979)
- Otis Rush, This One's a Good 'Un (Blue Horizon, 1969)
- Bennie Wallace, The Art of the Saxophone (Denon, 1987)
- Ben Webster, The Soul of Ben Webster (Verve, 1960)
