= Bunny Briggs =

American tap dancer (1922–2014)

Bunny Briggs (February 26, 1922 – November 15, 2014) was an American tap dancer who was inducted into the American Tap Dancing Hall of Fame in 2006.

Briggs was born under the name Bernard Briggs in Harlem, New York on February 26, 1922. When asked about his nickname Briggs said "Well, I'm fast." At one point he thought about becoming a Catholic priest but his priest told Briggs that "God clearly wanted him to be a dancer." In the 1960s, Briggs was known to dance with the likes of bandleaders Lionel Hampton and Duke Ellington, so much so that Briggs was deemed "Duke's dancer." In May 1985 Briggs performed on the NBC TV Special, "Motown Returns to the Apollo." He was nominated for a Tony Award in 1989 for his work in the Broadway show Black and Blue. He appeared on stage and in movies including the Gregory Hines film Tap in 1989. In 2002, Briggs received an honorary Doctorate of Performing Arts in American Dance by Oklahoma City University in 2002, honoring him as one of the nine doctorates of Tap Dance.

== Early life ==
Although the exact date is unknown, Briggs went to see a show at the Lincoln Theater between the ages of 3 and 5. His aunt, Gladys, was in the chorus line and Bill Robinson was headlining. Upon seeing the famous Bojangles dance, Briggs knew immediately what he wanted to do, commenting that "[Robinson] was so calm. Everything he did was beautiful." Briggs was infatuated with Robinson's composure on stage and form of dress. While other black performers at the time wore bell hop costumes, Robinson always dressed his best in a suit. After that night, Briggs fell in love with tap dancing. Besides his mother's uncle teaching him a step or two, Briggs never took dance lessons. He learned the basics of tap dance by watching and mimicking other performers. At the age of 5, Briggs had the opportunity to dance for Robinson; immediately following Briggs' performance, Robinson invited Briggs to dance on tour. His mother declined the offer on the grounds of Robinson's reputation as a gambling addict.

Between the ages of 4 and 5, Briggs would dance the Shimmy and the Charleston outside of a record shop for money. Crowds would gather at the shop to listen to Amos and Andy on the radio. When the show ended, the shop would put on records for Briggs to dance to. He made up to $15 a day dancing for the crowds. Briggs was discovered on this street corner by a man named Porkchops who managed Briggs and booked him gigs at casinos for split commission. Not long after, Briggs and Porkchops became part of a tetrad with Junie Miller and Paul White. They performed for 5 or 6 years as Porkchops, Navy, Rice, and Beans, entertaining audiences in dance halls between halves of each show. They were known for dancing to cutesy, upbeat songs such as "Bugle Call Blues". While performing with the tetrad, Briggs was discovered in 1930 by Luckey Roberts, who invited him to perform for high society with the Social Entertainers: a black band that played for the Vanderbilt Set.

Briggs was known for his delicate, humorous tapping which he developed while performing for high society. Although tap is a dance form that incorporates sound, his wealthy audiences found too much sound unappealing. When asked about his style of dance in an interview, Briggs answered "I was always an improvisation dancer. I never danced the same time more than two or three times. My style is carefree. It's carefree and hard but I try to make it look easy". Briggs' charm, skills, iconically big eyes and baby face won him the hearts of high society. They began sending him chauffeurs to bring him to parties and they fed him all the food he wanted. The party attendees would sit on the ground in a circle and watch him dance. On one occasion at an Astor Pageant, Fanny Brice sat Briggs on her lap and asked him if he wanted anything he didn't have. He responded in saying he wished to have a bike. The following day, Brice bought him one. Aside from live performances, Briggs made his first appearance on screen in the 1932 short film Slowpoke.

== Career ==
As a teenager, Briggs became an apprentice of the Whitman Sisters and danced at the Ubangi Club where he met Louise Crane. Crane arranged for him to perform at Kelly's Stables, and it's during this time that he earned his title as the Prince Charming of Tap. In the early 1940s, Briggs began traveling and performing with big band's led by men such as Earl Hines, Tommy Dorsey, Jimmy Dorsey, Charley Barnet, and Count Basie. At this time, he was also putting on white makeup and traveling with a mixed race saxophonist so they could perform in black and white clubs. In the 1950s, Briggs began making more television appearances. He was welcomed on once annually to the variety show Toast of the Town. He also appeared in the Universal 1950 short with the Benny Carter Orchestra, performing his trademarked paddle and roll, and in the Cavalcade of Bands.

Throughout the 1960s, Briggs made multiple appearances on the Ed Sullivan Show to perform. During this time, Briggs became well acquainted with Duke Ellington. After performing together at the Monterey Jazz Festival, Briggs became known as "Duke's Dancer." Duke was fond of Briggs as a performer and wrote him into My People, a pageant for the Century of Negro Progress Exhibition in 1963. On September 16, 1965, Briggs performed at the San Francisco Grace Cathedral. He performed as David in "David Danced Before the Lord With All His Might," alongside the Herman McCoy Singers, Jon Hendricks, and Duke Ellington's band. Briggs almost didn't perform for personal reasons and beliefs, but Ellington convinced him to. It was at this performance that Ellington described Briggs as "the most super-leviathonic rhythmaturgically syncopated tapster-magician-ism-ist."

In the 1970s, Bunny Briggs made appearances on the Johnny Carson Show, and in TV specials like Apollo Uptown and Monk's Time. Many tap dancers faded from the spotlight during this decade as Rock n' Roll gained popularity. Attention towards the Civil RIghts Movement also contributed to renowned tappers fading from view. A select few tap dancers, including Briggs, remained successful with the help of performers in other kinds of show business like television and music. In 1979, Briggs was featured in the documentary film No Maps on My Taps. Throughout the 70's and early 80's, Briggs performed on tour ships. In the 80's he also toured around Europe with the Hoofers. In 1983 he made an appearance in My One and Only on Broadway, and returned to Broadway in 1989 for the tap special Black and Blue. During this time, Briggs also mentored Savion Glover as a teen during the revitalization of tap. Glover assisted in ushering tap into the popularization of hip hop.

== Style ==
Briggs' style is a combination of early tap greats such as Bill Robinson, because he learned how to tap from watching them. He was fast with his feet, but knew how to utilize silence as much as noise, best seen in his tap solo to "In a Sentimental Mood" by Duke Ellington in the 1989 Broadway musical revue Black and Blue. Briggs began to develop his distinct fashion of tap performance from an early age. Unlike many tap dancers, Briggs maintained a stiff upper body and kept his weight back while tapping. He performed this way from a very young age, because the Vanderbilt Set preferred composed, delicate performances. As Briggs began to perform with bebop bands, he adapted his style and rhythm to match the music he was performing alongside, with the help of Dizzy Gillespie and Charlie Parker. Part of this adaptation included having continuation of movement; Briggs accomplished this by using the paddle and roll. Many East Coast tap dancers considered the paddle and roll to be cheating, but Briggs trademarked the step by using pantomime and synchronizing his steps with sixteenth notes. Savion Glover notes "He'd act out his dance, like he'd have a scene going on his mind. In the middle of the dance, he'd strike these poses. I mean, our objective is always to tell a story, but he was such a sophisticated, lyrical cat." Briggs' steps were so fast, paddle and roll included, that he earned his most well known nickname. His tap movements were always fast and crisp, inspiring him to wear his taps loose, producing a sharper sound.

== Personal life ==
Not much is known about Brigg's personal life, but he was a devout Catholic who attended St. Mark's the Evangelist RC Church at 65 West 138 St, NYC 10037. He considered becoming a priest, but Briggs' own pastor told him God wanted him to dance (NYT). On many occasions he was asked to perform in a church, but he believed it to be sacrilegious (Hill). His only documented family is his mother, who did not approve of his career as a dancer. "Mrs. Briggs once told the [Barnet Band] leader that she would rather see her son running an elevator than performing, or performing with [the band]".

In 1982, Briggs married the jazz harpist Olivette Miller. She died in 2003.

Briggs died in Las Vegas, Nevada on November 15, 2014, aged 92.

== Discography ==
- Broken Windows, Empty Hallways (Prestige, 1972; with Houston Person)

== Awards ==
Briggs received the Flo-Bert lifetime achievement award in 1998. He received an Honorary Doctorate of Performing Arts in American Dance from Oklahoma City University. He was also nominated for a Tony Award for his performance in Black and Blue.

== Legacy ==
Bunny Briggs had immense influence on performing arts and the tap community by changing the art itself. "[Bunny] became to tap-dancing roughly what Ella Fitzgerald was to scat singing. He was the first to take an existing form of expression and update it for the new musical language then known as bebop" (Friedwald). He also redefined standards in the community, turning a step that was seen as cheating (the paddle and roll) into a trademarked move that he is remembered for. Briggs' performance at the Grace Cathedral challenged the American perspective, which associated jazz and tap with bootlegging liquor and poor morals. Briggs and Ellington set out to prove that tap and jazz could be spiritual too, redefining key aspects of American culture.

In 2021, playwright and librettist Sandra Seaton, a relative of Briggs, donated seven linear boxes containing papers belonging to Briggs as well as to his wife Olivette Miller and father-in-law Flournoy Miller to Yale's Beinecke Library.
