= Lillyn Brown =

American blues singer, vaudeville entertainer and teacher (1885–1969)

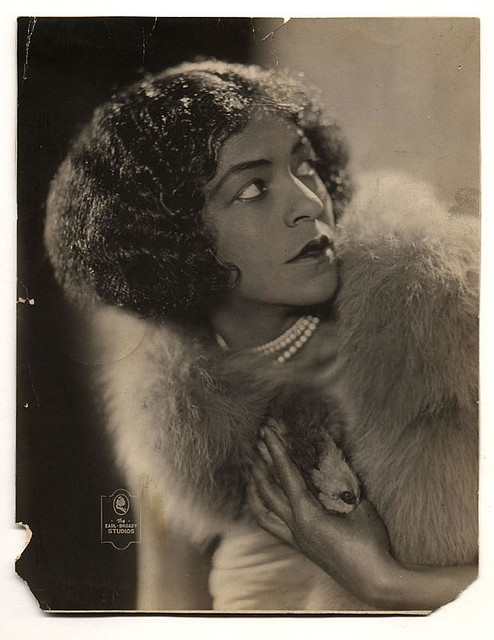
- Brown circa 1920

Background information
- Also known as: E. L. Brown; Maude Jones; Fannie Baker; Mildred Fernandez; Lillian Brown Wilson; Lillian Demont
- Born: Lillian Thomas; April 24, 1885; Atlanta, Georgia, U.S.
- Died: June 8, 1969 (aged 84) Manhattan, New York City, U.S.
- Occupations: Singer, vaudeville entertainer
- Years active: 1894–1934, intermittently later until 1964

Lillyn Brown (born Lillian Thomas; April 24, 1885 – June 8, 1969), sometimes credited as Lillyan Brown, was an American singer, vaudeville entertainer and teacher who claimed to have been "the first professional vocalist to sing the blues in front of the public", in 1908. She was billed as "The Kate Smith of Harlem" and "The Original Gay 90's Gal".

== Biography ==
Brown was born in Atlanta, Georgia, on April 24, 1885, as Lillian Thomas. She was the daughter of an African-American mother and a French father. She was light-skinned, and "some black friends said that they did not realize she was a Negro until she told them."

She first performed in 1894 as "The Indian Princess" with an all-white female string band. By 1896, billed as "The World's Youngest Interlocutor", she was performing in minstrel shows as a male impersonator, often credited as E. L. Brown to disguise her gender. She developed an act in which she wore a top hat and tails, sang several songs as a man, and then revealed her long hair and continued singing as a woman. She claimed to be the first professional vocalist to sing the blues before a public audience, in performances at the Little Strand Theatre in Chicago in 1908.

In 1918, she replaced Esther Bigeou as the female star of the popular musical comedy Broadway Rastus in New York City. She made her only recordings in March and May 1921, a few months after the pioneering blues recordings by Mamie Smith. Brown recorded for Emerson Records, backed by the Jazz-Bo Syncopators, a band that included Ed Cox (cornet), Bud Aiken and Herb Flemming (trombones), Garvin Bushell (clarinet), Johnny Mullins (violin), and Lutice Perkins (drums). She only recorded four tracks – "Ever Lovin' Blues", "If That's What You Want Here It Is", "The Jazz Me Blues", and "Bad-Land Blues". They were then reissued under different names by other record labels: Maude Jones on Medallion Records, Fannie Baker on Oriole Records, and Mildred Fernandez on Regal Records.

Brown appeared on Broadway, toured in Europe, and performed at many of the major nightclubs in Harlem and on the Keith vaudeville circuit. She announced her retirement in 1934, but she appeared in 1938 in the Broadway show Sing Out the News. In 1949 she appeared in Marc Blitzstein's opera Regina, at the 46th Street Theatre in New York. In 1952 she appeared in a short-lived revival of Kiss Me, Kate on Broadway. She operated an acting and singing school in Manhattan during the 1950s and taught at the Jarahal School of Music in Harlem. She also wrote, performed and produced plays for the Abyssinian Baptist Church, and was active in the African American Actors Guild. Her final public performance was at a tribute concert for Mamie Smith in 1964.

Brown died at St. Rose's Home at 71 Jackson Street on the Lower East Side of Manhattan, New York City, on June 8, 1969, at the age of 84.

== Broadway ==
- Sing Out the News (1938)
- Regina (1949)
- Kiss Me, Kate, revival (1952)

== See also ==
- Florence Hines
