= Olivette Miller =

American harpist and singer (1914–2003)

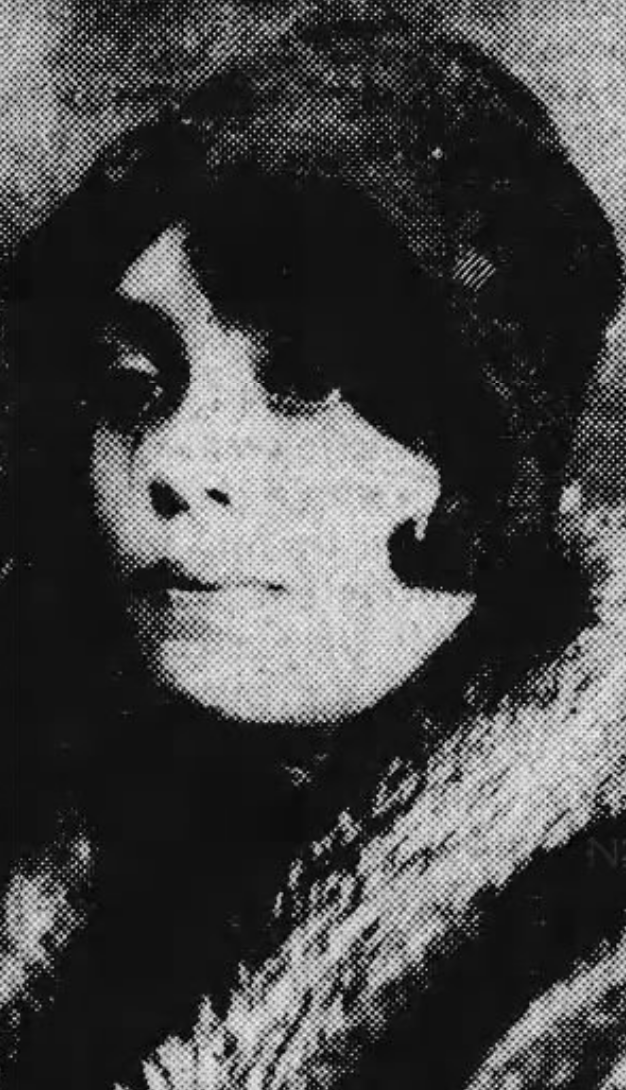
- Miller, in a 1930 newspaper
- Born: February 26, 1914; New York New York, US
- Died: April 27, 2003 (aged 89); North Las Vegas, Nevada, US
- Other name: Olivette Miller-Briggs (after 1982)
- Occupation: Musician
- Spouse(s): Sax Mallard, Bunny Briggs
- Parent(s): Flournoy Miller, Bessie Oliver Miller
- Relatives: Irvin C. Miller (uncle)

Olivette N. Miller (February 26, 1914 – April 27, 2003), later Olivette Miller-Briggs, was an American musician, a swing harpist and singer.

== Early life ==
Miller was born in Chicago (some sources say New York), the daughter of actor and writer Flournoy Miller and performer Bessie Oliver Miller. Irvin C. Miller and Quintard Miller, both performers and producers, were her uncles. She attended the Ethical Culture School in New York, and the East Greenwich Academy in Rhode Island. She pursued further studies at the University of Pennsylvania. She studied harp at Juilliard and in Paris with Marcel Tournier.

== Career ==
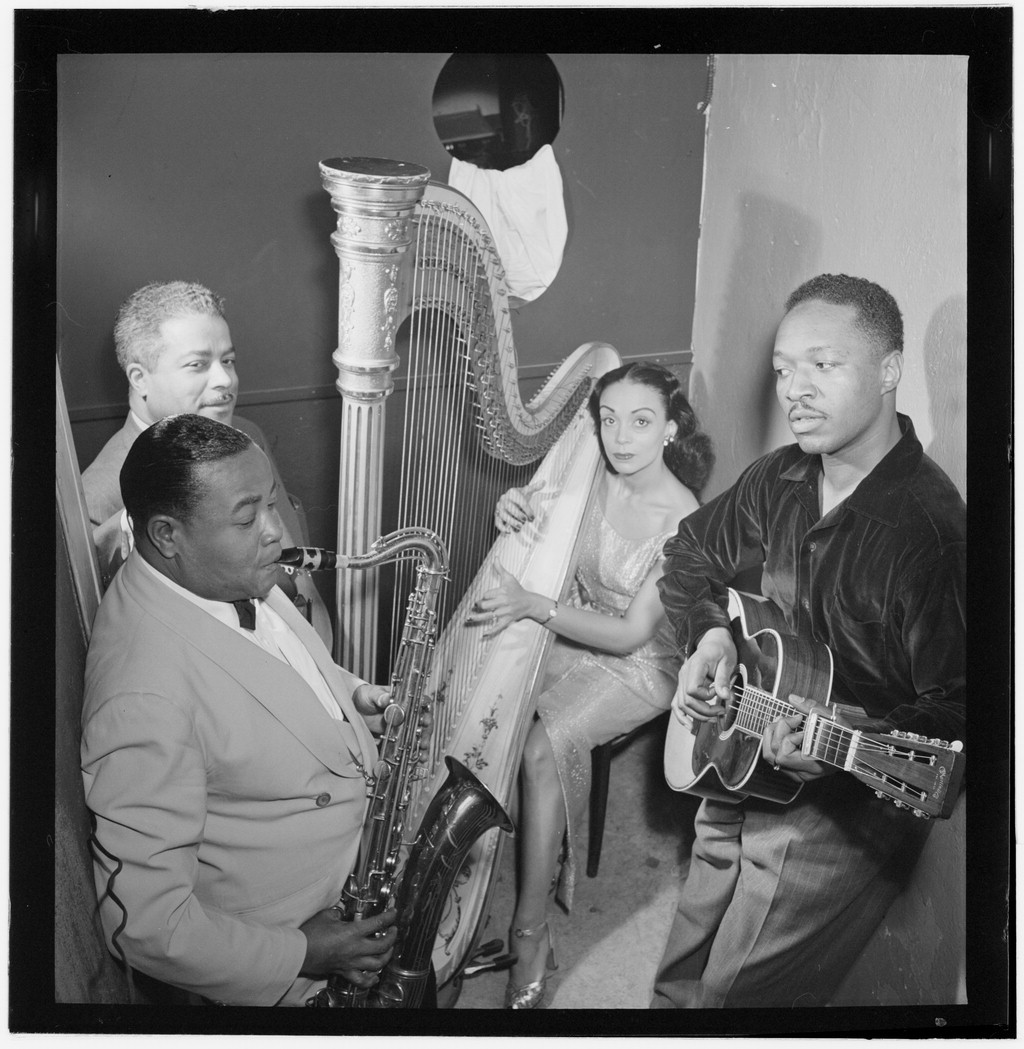
Gene Sedric, Cliff Jackson, Olivette Miller, and Josh White, Café Society (Downtown), New York, N.Y., ca. Mar. 1947 (William P. Gottlieb 15891)

Miller joined Noble Sissle's orchestra in 1937, and toured with them in Europe with the USO during World War II. She also played as a solo act, and was billed as "the World's Greatest Swing Harpist" when she performed on tour and in Las Vegas in the 1940s and 1950s. She appeared on Broadway in Africana (1934), on television on Toast of the Town (1955), The Ed Sullivan Show (1962), and The Rosey Grier Show (1968), and in the film A Rage in Harlem (1991).

In 1972, Miller sued comedian Flip Wilson, Michael Jackson, and others for $500,000 for infringing on her father's intellectual property. In 1974, she had a solo show in Reno. She wrote and tried to shepherd into production a biographical film about her father, focusing on how his comedy act was exploited by white producers. In 1976 she wrote and co-produced The Show Folks, a syndicated situation comedy for television, starring her ex-husband, dancer Freddie Gordon, with Carole La Mond and DeForest Covan.

== Personal life ==
Olivette Miller was married numerous times, usually briefly. Her husbands were Orion N. Page (married 1930), Channing Price (married 1933), Athos B. Guy (married 1934), saxophonist Oett Mallard (married 1938), actor Freddie Gordon (divorced in 1952), comedian Albert Gibson (married 1954), Eric Darby, and tap dancer Bernard "Bunny" Briggs (married in 1982). She had a son, Alvin Miller Mallard (1939–1943), and daughter born in 1949. Miller died in 2003, aged 89 years, in North Las Vegas, Nevada. Her papers are part of the Flournoy E. Miller Papers at Emory University.
