= Broadway Rastus (revue) =

Vaudeville show group

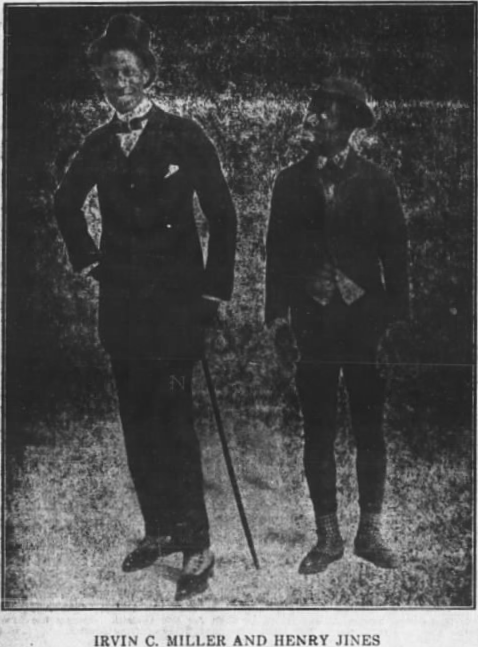
Irvin C. Miller as Rastus & Henry Jines as Mose (circa 1917)

Broadway Rastus was a 1915-1928 revue written by Irvin Miller. It toured for several years at various venues with casts including many successful performers. Miller performed in the show. Other cast members included Esther Bigeou and Henry Jines. Lester Walton reviewed a Philadelphia performance of the show lauding many of the performances and calling the show a diamond in the rough that would benefit from more funding.

Lillyn Brown eventually succeeded Esther Bigeou in the show's starring role.

Maceo Pinkard's work was in the show.

== Cast ==
- Esther Bigeou (later succeeded in the show by Lillyn Brown
- Edna Alexander
- Billy Cumby
- James Woodson
