= Henry Jines =

American vaudeville actor

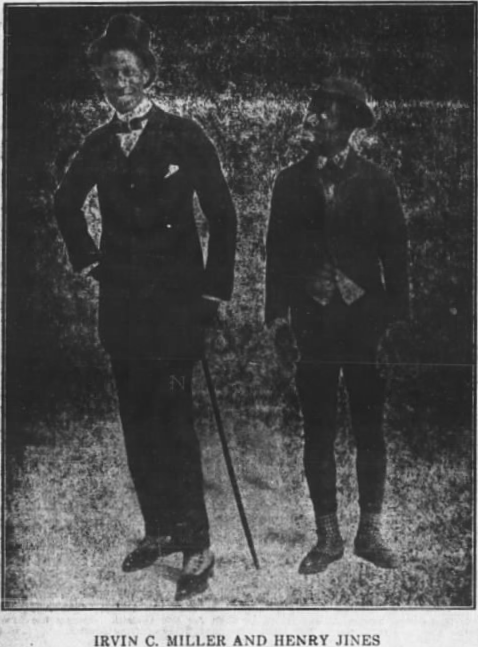
Irvin C. Miller as Rastus & Henry Jines as Mose from Broadway Rastus (circa 1917)

Henry Jines was an American vaudeville actor. He starred in stage productions including Irvin Miller's Broadway Rastus, and performed in blackface.

Jines was from Atlanta, Georgia. In 1913 he had reportedly been writing vaudeville sketches and lyrics for about six years. The St. Louis Argus reviewed a show he featured in with Frank Montgomery, Blondie Robinson, Frank "Chinese" Walker, and Florence McClain February 1921.

== Theater ==
- Broadway Rastus (revue) (1917)
- Broadway Scandals (1921)
- Swing It (1937) as Rusty

== See also ==
- Minstrel show
- Vaudeville
