= Vivienne Baber =

American actress (born 1911)

- Born: 1911; Brooklyn, New York, U.S.
- Occupation: Actress
- Years active: 1929–1933, 1946
- Spouse: Peter Douglas Johnson (m. 1937, divorced)
- Relatives: Georgia Douglas Johnson (mother-in-law); Henry Lincoln Johnson (father-in-law)

Vivienne Baber (born 1911, date of death unknown), sometimes credited as Vivian or Vivianne, was an American actress. She had a starring role in the 1932 film The Black King.

== Early life ==
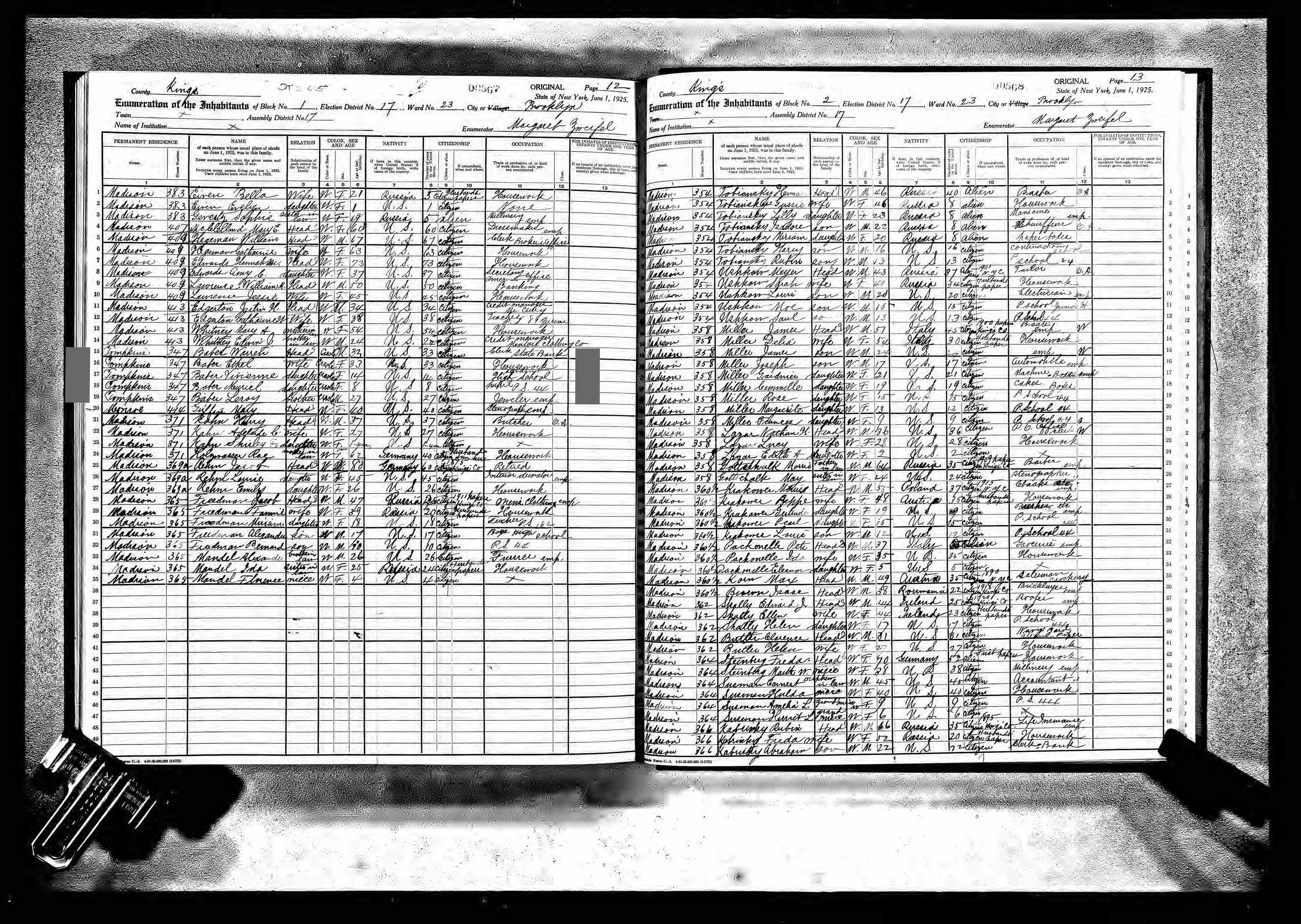
1925 NY census, Baber family

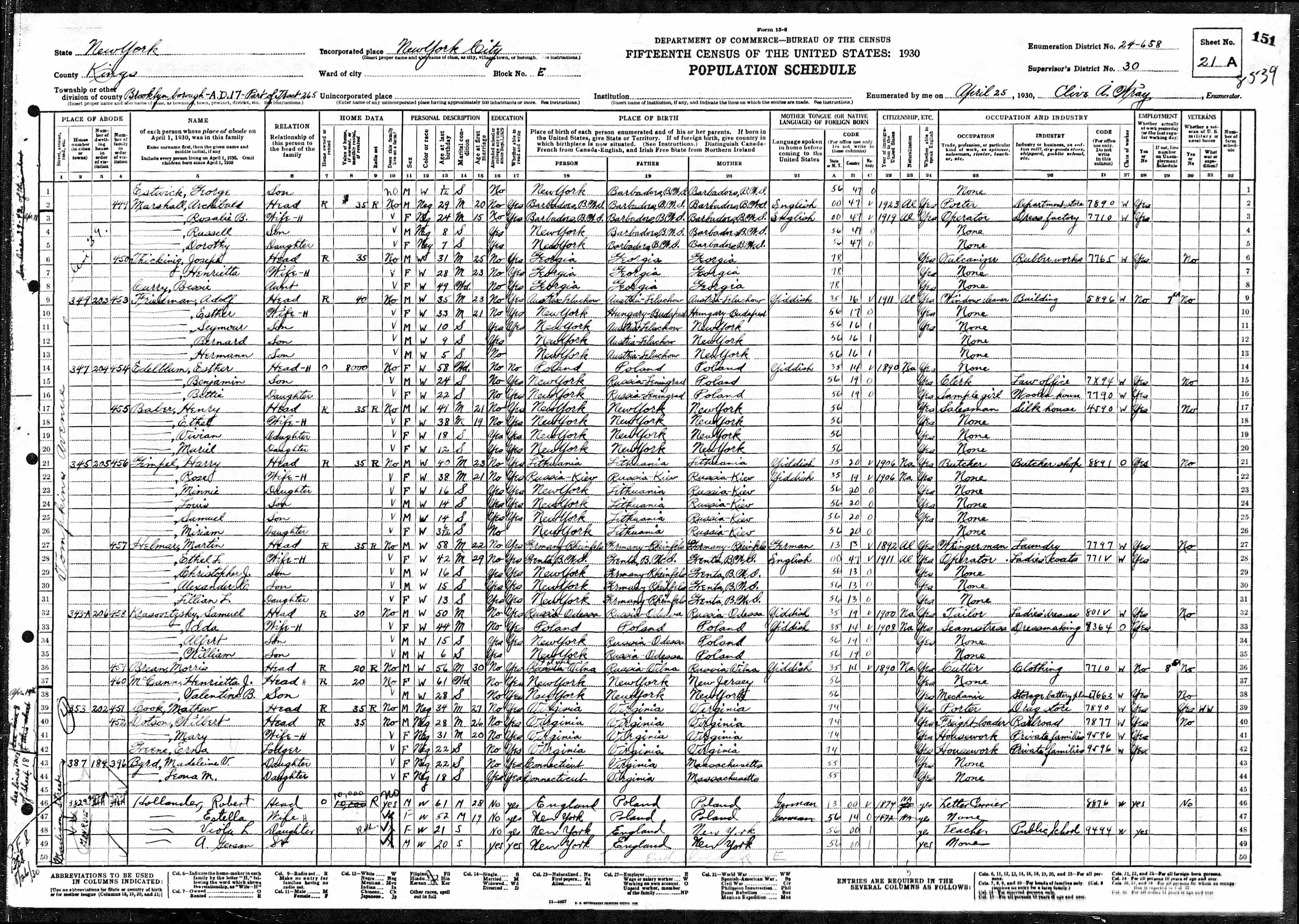
1930 U.S. census, Vivian Baber

Baber was born in 1911 in Brooklyn, New York, to parents Henry and Ethel. For the 1925 New York state census, her family's race is listed as Creole. Her father was a bank clerk and she had a younger sister named Muriel. (Note: 1925 New York state census, Vivienne Baber family) By 1930 she had changed the spelling of her name to "Vivian". (Note: 1930 United States census, Vivienne Baber) She began acting on stage productions in 1929, at age 18; her first role was the main character in the play, Harlem. Before that, she had sung in a cabaret chorus. In a 1932 interview, Baber said she had "Indian and English blood in [her] veins", and described herself as "three-quarters white and one-quarter colored". She also said she had danced at the Brooklyn Academy of Music, and still lived in the borough.

== Career ==
Baber played the starring role in a 1929 production of Make Me Know It at Wallack's Theatre in New York City, following a three-day preview in New Rochelle. She played a part in You Know Me that same year at Wallack's Theatre. A reviewer praised Baber's performance as "surpass[ing] the rest of the cast" in 1930's Sweet Chariot, and another said she was good at her part and the play entertaining, though it was short of being "important". She was among the supporting cast of Confidence with Frank H. Wilson later that year. Baber was a principal actor in a 1932–33 production of the musical comedy Shuffle Along by Flournoy Miller.

After disliking the roles she was typecast in, she quit acting for seven years. During this time, she worked for the Afro-American Newspapers and organized a children's theater organization in Washington, D.C. She returned to acting around 1946 to play the character Wini Bennett in the play, On Whitman Avenue in New York City.

She was the only woman cast in one show.

=== Theater ===
- Harlem (1929) as Cordelia Williams
- Make Me Know It (1929) as Mona Bannon
- Ginger Snaps (1929)
- Sweet Chariot (1930) as Delia
- Confidence (1930)
- Savage Rhythm (1932) as Star
- Shuffle Along of 1933 as Alice Walker; a revival of Shuffle Along
- On Whitman Avenue (1946) as Wini Bennett

=== Filmography ===
- They Know Their Groceries (1929) Vitaphone short
- The Black King (1932) as Mary Lou Lawton

== Personal life ==
Baber married Peter Douglas Johnson (1906–1958) in Brooklyn on February 28, 1937. They divorced before May 1946.
