= Blondie Robinson =

Vaudeville performer

Blondie Robinson, also sometimes written as Blondi Robinson, was an African American renowned vaudeville comedic act performer.

== Biography ==
Details around his birth and early life are unknown but Blondie Robinson is thought to have been born in the late 19th-century in California.

He was lauded in a 1909 Indianapolis Freeman review for his skilled comedy routine. The Boston Globe described him as a comedian and described his performing role as a "man about town". His performances included various song and dance routines, costumes, contortions, and blackface. He partnered with fellow vaudeville performers including Bisette, Henry Jines, and Billie McCarver. In 1926, he toured Australia with the minstrel-revival troupe, Ye Olde Nigger Minstrel, in which he wore blackface.

The Brown University Library has a collection of photographs of him and fellow performers of the vaudeville era.

== Theater ==
- The Isle of Insects (1906), touring show produced by Abo Zebretis, starring Robinson and Emma Thompson.
- Mr. Mikado (1907), a comic spoof of The Mikado, performed in Los Angeles by the Unique troupe, music by Homer Long.
- Hello (1921)
- Plantation Days (1922), a touring show by musician James P. Johnson and produced by Maury Greenwald.
- The Sepian Stars (1936)
