= William Mark Young =

- Born: March 18, 1881; Alton
- Died: January 1, 1946 (aged 64); Wilmette
- Education: Washington University in St. Louis
- Occupation: Painter, muralist, commercial artist

William Mark Young (1881–1946) was an American painter and commercial artist, known for his murals and book illustrations.

Young was born on March 18, 1881, at Alton, Illinois. He was educated at Upper Alton High School and the Washington University in St. Louis School of Fine Arts (now Sam Fox School of Design & Visual Arts). He established a commercial arts business in St. Louis, before relocating to Chicago. He also lived for a time in Cleveland, Ohio.

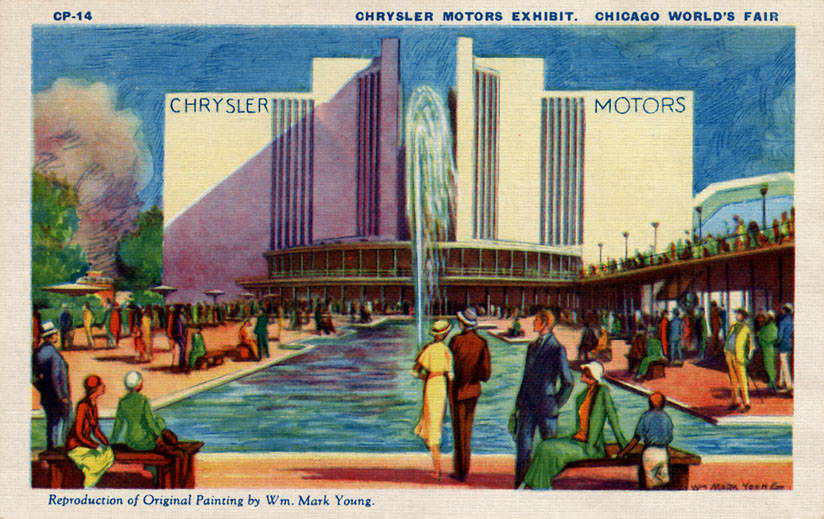
Chrysler Motors Exhibit, Chicago Worlds Fair (circa 1933)

He painted fifteen murals—relocated subsequently to the Ohio Statehouse—for the Ohio State Exhibit at the 1933 A Century of Progress International Exposition, (also known as the Chicago World's Fair), and made paintings of other exhibits there. In 1937 he created a set of twelve murals for the walls of the new City Hall in Marietta, Ohio, as part of the celebration of the 150th Anniversary of the Ordinance of 1787 and the sesquicentennial (150th anniversary) of the establishment of Marietta in 1788. In 2012, the latter were removed from the building, cleaned, conserved, and mounted for display. They were then exhibited at the Campus Martius Museum in Marietta.

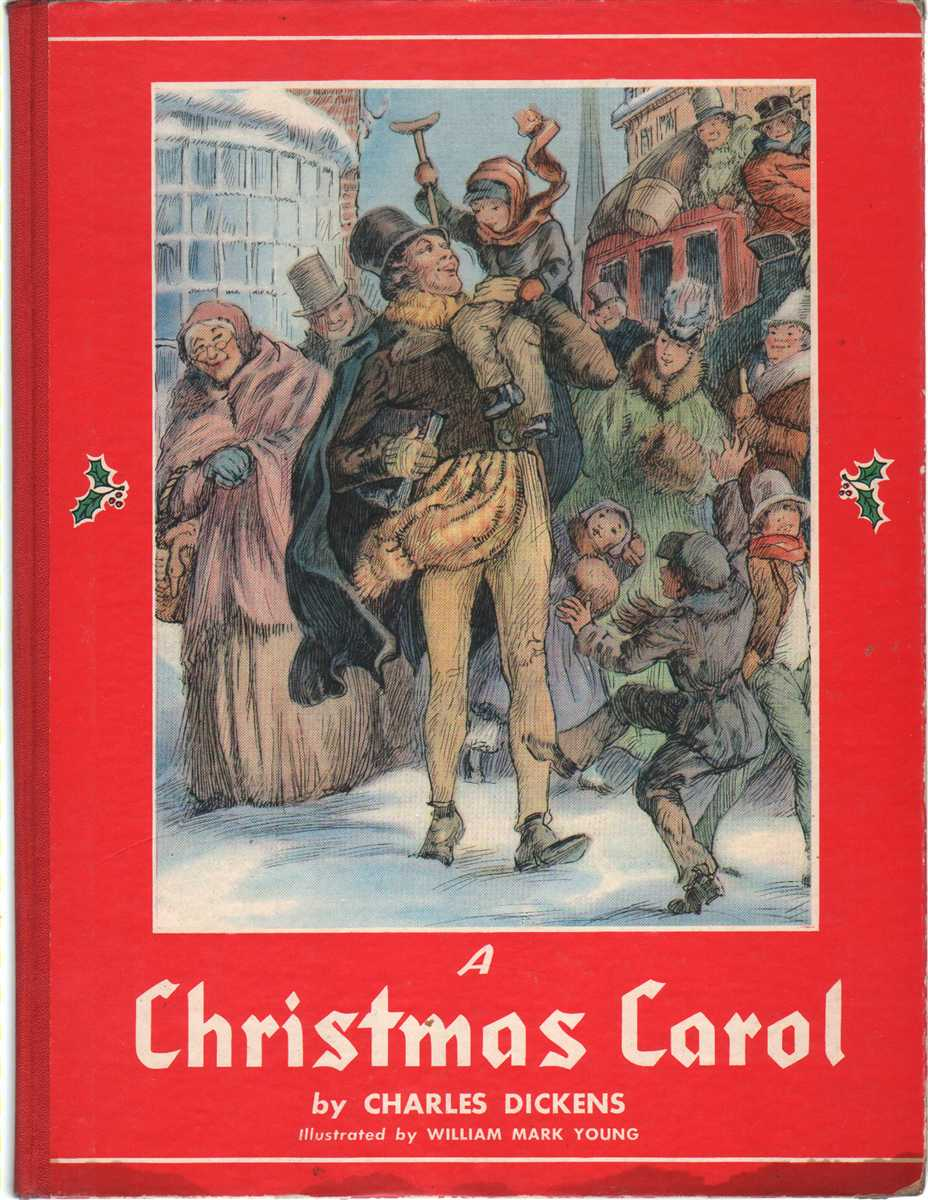
A Christmas Carol (1939)

Among the books he illustrated was a 1939 edition of Charles Dickens's A Christmas Carol. He also produced pictorial maps.

He died on January 1, 1946, at Wilmette, Illinois.

He signed himself Wm. Mark Young.

== Works illustrated ==
- Jaragu of the Jungle - Rex Beach (1937)
- A Christmas Carol - Charles Dickens (1939 edition)
- Tom Beatty, Ace of the Service, and the Big Brain Gang - Rex Loomis (1939)
- Gallipolis; Being an Account of the French Five Hundred and of the Town They Established On La Belle Riviere. [American Guide Series] Compiled by Workers of the Writers' Program of the Work Projects Administration in the State of Ohio. Myron Flechtner (author). (1940)
- A Soldier's Creed and Bible of Americanism - Samuel Harden Stille, compiler (1942)
