= My People (Duke Ellington album) =

Studio album by Duke Ellington
- Released: 1965
- Recorded: August 20, 21 & 27, 1963
- Genre: Jazz
- Length: 42:16
- Label: Contact
- Producer: Bob Thiele

Duke Ellington chronology
Studio Sessions New York 1963 (1963)	My People (1965)	Ellington '65 (1965)

My People is an album by American pianist, composer and bandleader Duke Ellington, written and recorded in 1963 for a stage show and originally released on Bob Thiele's short-lived Contact label before being reissued on the Flying Dutchman label and later released on CD on the Red Baron label. The album features recordings of compositions by Ellington for a stage show presented in Chicago as part of the Century of Negro Progress Exhibition in 1963.

== Reception ==
Professional ratings
Review scores
Source	Rating
AllMusic	3/5 stars
Record Mirror	5/5 stars

Released in 1965 to commemorate the 100th anniversary of the Emancipation Proclamation. The reviewer for AllMusic, Stephen Thomas Erlewine, wrote: "My People is a snapshot of a specific era and is most interesting as a representation of its time, not as an individual work."

== Track listing ==
All compositions by Duke Ellington and Billy Strayhorn

1. "Ain't But the One/Will You Be There?/99%" – 5:16
2. "Come Sunday/David Danced Before the Lord" – 6:09
3. "My Mother, My Father (Heritage)" – 2:50
4. "Montage" – 6:54
5. "My People/The Blues" – 8:56
6. "Workin' Blues/My Man Sends Me/Jail Blues/Lovin' Lover" – 5:57
7. "King Fit the Battle of Alabam'" – 3:25
8. "What Color Is Virtue?" – 2:49

Recorded at Universal Studios, Chicago, on August 20 (tracks 1a, 2, 4, 5b, 6a, 6c & 7), August 21 (tracks 1b, 1c, 3, 5a & 8), and August 27 (tracks 6b & 6d), 1963.

== Personnel ==
- Duke Ellington – director, narration
- Ray Nance – cornet
- Bill Berry, Ziggy Harrell, Nat Woodard – trumpet
- Booty Wood, Britt Woodman – trombone
- Chuck Connors – bass trombone
- John Sanders – valve trombone
- Rudy Powell – alto saxophone
- Pete Clark, Russell Procope – alto saxophone, clarinet
- Harold Ashby – tenor saxophone, clarinet
- Bob Freedman – tenor saxophone
- Billy Strayhorn – piano
- Joe Benjamin – bass
- Louis Bellson – drums
- Juan Amalbert – conga
- Joya Sherrill, Lil Greenwood, Jimmy McPhail, Irving Bunton Singers – vocals
- Bunny Briggs – tap dance
