= Serenade to Sweden =

Studio album by Duke Ellington & Alice Babs
- Released: 1966
- Recorded: February 28 & March 1, 1963
- Genre: Jazz
- Label: Reprise

Duke Ellington chronology
Duke Ellington's Jazz Violin Session (1963)	Serenade to Sweden (1966)	Studio Sessions New York 1963 (1963)

Serenade to Sweden is an album by American pianist, composer and bandleader Duke Ellington and vocalist Alice Babs recorded in 1963 and released on the Reprise label in 1966. The album was released on CD in 2017 by Real Gone Music.

== Track listing ==
All tracks are written by Duke Ellington except as noted.

No.	Title	Writer(s)	Length
1.	"Serenade to Sweden"		3:10
2.	"The Boy in My Dreams"		2:30
3.	"Stoona"		2:53
4.	"La De Doody Doo"		2:15
5.	"Azure"		2:50
6.	"Come Sunday"		4:50
7.	"C Jam Blues"		2:36
8.	"I Didn't Know About You"	Ellington, Bob Russell	4:10
9.	"Satin Doll"	Ellington, Billy Strayhorn, Johnny Mercer	2:55
10.	"Take Love Easy"		3:22
11.	"Babsie"		2:05
12.	"(I Want) Something to Live For"		2:48
13.	"I'm Beginning to See the Light"	Ellington, Don George, Johnny Hodges, Harry James	2:38
14.	"Untitled Lullaby"		2:33

Recorded at Studio Hoche, Paris, on February 28 (tracks 5, 9 & 14) and March 1 (tracks 1–4, 6–8 & 10–13), 1963.

== Personnel ==
- Duke Ellington – piano (tracks 1–11, 13 & 14)
- Alice Babs – vocals
- Georges Barboteu – French horn (tracks 5, 9 & 14)
- Billy Strayhorn – piano (track 12)
- Kenny Clarke (tracks 1–4, 6–8 & 10–13), Gilbert Rovere (tracks 5, 9 & 14) – bass
- Sam Woodyard – drums
