= Ellington '65 =

1965 album by Duke Ellington

Studio album by Duke Ellington
- Released: September 1964
- Recorded: April 15, 16 & 27, 1964
- Genre: Jazz
- Label: Reprise

Duke Ellington chronology
My People (1963)	Ellington '65 (1964)	Duke Ellington Plays Mary Poppins (1965)

Ellington '65 is an album by American pianist, composer and bandleader Duke Ellington recorded in April 1964 and released on the Reprise label ironically in late 1964. The album features recordings of popular tunes arranged by Ellington and Billy Strayhorn, a formula that was revisited on Ellington '66 (1965).

== Reception ==
The AllMusic review by Matt Collar noted that it was a "slightly more commercial effort than many previous Duke Ellington recordings," adding "While Ellington '65 isn't a bad recording, it is by no means required listening and will most likely appeal to die-hard Ellington completists."

Professional ratings
Review scores
Source	Rating
AllMusic	3/5 stars

== Chart performance ==
The album debuted on Billboard magazine's Top LP's chart in the issue dated October 3, 1964, peaking at No. 133 during a seven-week run on the chart.

== Track listing ==
Side One:

1. "Hello, Dolly!" (Jerry Herman) – 2:06
2. "Call Me Irresponsible" (Jimmy Van Heusen, Sammy Cahn) – 3:18
3. "Fly Me to the Moon (In Other Words)" (Bart Howard) – 2:30
4. "The Peking Theme (So Little Time)" (Dimitri Tiomkin, Paul Francis Webster) – 3:03
5. "Danke Schoen" (Milt Gabler, Bert Kaempfert) – 2:35
6. "More (Theme from Mondo Cane)" (Riz Ortolani, Nino Oliviero) – 2:55

Side Two:

1. "The Second Time Around" (Cahn, Van Heusen) – 3:43
2. "Never On Sunday" (Manos Hadjidakis) – 3:55
3. "I Left My Heart in San Francisco" (George Cory, Douglass Cross) – 3:02
4. "Blowin' in the Wind" (Bob Dylan) – 2:25
5. "Stranger on the Shore" (Acker Bilk) – 2:50
- Recorded at Fine Studios, New York on April 15 (tracks 2, 7, 8 & 11), April 16 (tracks 3, 4, 6 & 10), & April 27 (tracks 1, 5 & 9), 1964.

== Personnel ==
- Duke Ellington – piano
- Cat Anderson, Rolf Ericson, Herb Jones, Cootie Williams – trumpet
- Lawrence Brown, Buster Cooper – trombone
- Chuck Connors – bass trombone
- Jimmy Hamilton – clarinet, tenor saxophone
- Johnny Hodges – alto saxophone
- Russell Procope – alto saxophone, clarinet
- Paul Gonsalves, Harry Carney – tenor saxophone
- Major Holley – bass
- Sam Woodyard – drums
