= Marion A. Brooks =

American actor, playwright

Marion A. Brooks was an actor, playwright, and theater businessman. He partnered on the Bijou theater company at the newly established Bijou Theater in Montgomery, Alabama with players from Chicago. After it folded, he returned to work at the Pekin Theatre in Chicago.

With Flournoy Miller, he founded the Bijou Stock Company in Montgomery, Alabama in 1908. It closed in May 1908. He helped open the Chester Amusement Company with J. Ed. Green, a theater operator in Chicago.

== Theater ==
- Ephraham Johnson from Norfolk (1908), co-starred as Harry Blue and co-wrote

== Works ==
- Out All Night co-wrote with J. E. Green
- Panama (1908) co-wrote with Charles A. Hunter
