= They Know Their Groceries =

1929 American film with an African American cast

They Know Their Groceries is a 1929 Vitaphone Varieties short comedy film directed by Bryan Foy. It stars vaudeville comedy duo Flournoy Miller and Aubrey Lyles and features an African American cast. The plot involves inattentive grocers. Sam Sax was the producer.

Foy was himself a vaudevillian in a family of vaudevillians before he got into directing and producing films.

A review of the film described it as funny but not hilarious.

== Cast ==
- F. E. Miller
- Aubrey Lyles
- Vivienne Baber
- Onion Jeffrey
- Paul Floyd
- Oswald Lyles
