= Studio Sessions New York 1963 =

1987 album by Duke Ellington

Studio album by Duke Ellington
- Released: 1987
- Recorded: April 17–18, May 15, and July 18, 1963
- Studio: A & R (New York City)
- Genre: Jazz
- Label: LMR

Duke Ellington chronology
Serenade to Sweden (1963)	Studio Sessions New York 1963 (1987)	My People (1963)

Studio Sessions New York 1963 is the fourth volume of The Private Collection, a series of recordings made by American pianist, composer and bandleader Duke Ellington for his personal collection which was first released on the LMR label in 1987 and later on the Saja label.

== Reception ==
Professional ratings
Review scores
Source	Rating
AllMusic	4/5 stars

The AllMusic review by Scott Yanow awarded the album 4 stars and stated:

Filled with previously unknown Ellington compositions, a stockpile of fresh material well worth a full investigation by contemporary musicians. Throughout all but the four full-band tracks, the focus is on cornetist Ray Nance, who is the only brass player present on most of this set. Johnny Hodges, Jimmy Hamilton and Paul Gonsalves also receive a good sampling of solo space on this strong entry in The Private Collection program.

== Track listing ==
All compositions by Duke Ellington except as indicated

1. "Bad Woman" – 4:36
2. "Jeep's Blues" (Ellington, Johnny Hodges) – 4:08
3. "Stoona" – 4:33
4. "Serenade to Sweden" – 2:38
5. "Harmony in Harlem" (Ellington, Hodges, Irving Mills) – 4:20
6. "Action in Alexandria" – 2:31
7. "Tajm" – 3:21
8. "Isfahan" (Ellington, Billy Strayhorn) – 3:19
9. "Killian's Lick" – 4:30
10. "Blousons Noir" – 3:46
11. "Elysee" (Strayhorn) – 2:25
12. "Butter and Oleo!" – 4:37
13. "Got Nobody Now" (Hodges) – 2:36
14. "M.G." – 2:54
15. "Blue Rose" – 2:47
16. "July 18th Blues" – 5:32

Recorded at A & R Studio, New York, on April 17 (tracks 2, 9, 13 & 14), April 18 (tracks 10–12 & 15), May 15 (tracks 1& 3–5), and July 18, 1963 (tracks 6–8 & 16).

== Personnel ==
- Duke Ellington – piano
- Ray Nance – cornet
- Cat Anderson, Rolf Ericson, Eddie Preston, Cootie Williams – trumpet (tracks 6–8 & 16)
- Lawrence Brown, Buster Cooper – trombone (tracks 6–8 & 16)
- Chuck Connors – bass trombone (tracks 6–8 & 16)
- Johnny Hodges, Russell Procope – alto saxophone
- Jimmy Hamilton – clarinet, tenor saxophone
- Paul Gonsalves – tenor saxophone
- Harry Carney – baritone saxophone
- Ernie Shepard – bass
- Sam Woodyard – drums
