= Aubrey Lyles =

American vaudeville performer, playwright and songwriter (1884–1932)

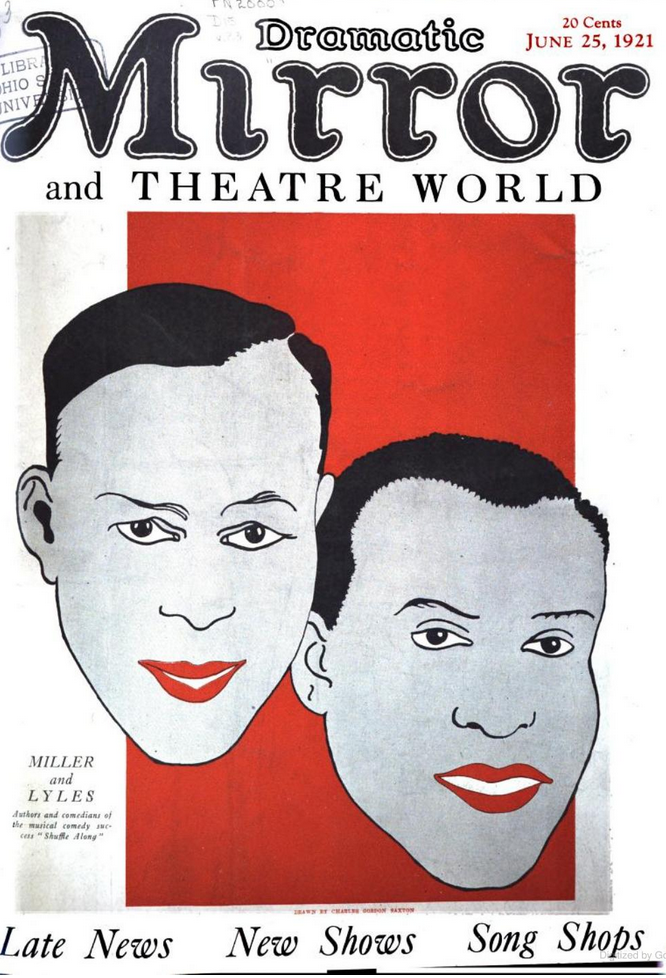
- Miller and Lyles on the cover of Dramatic Mirror (June 25, 1921), drawn by Charles Gordon Saxton
- Born: 8 January 1884; Jackson, Tennessee
- Died: 28 July 1932 (aged 48); New York City
- Occupations: Vaudeville performer, playwright, songwriter, lyricist

Aubrey Lee Lyles (8 January 1884 – 28 July 1932), sometimes credited as A. L. Lyles, was an American vaudeville performer, playwright, songwriter, and lyricist. He appeared with Flournoy E. Miller as Miller and Lyles as a popular African-American comedy duo from 1905 until shortly before his death. in 1929 they appeared on film as grocers in the Vitaphone Varieties short comedy film They Know Their Groceries.

== Biography ==
Lyles was born in Jackson, Tennessee, and attended Fisk University in Nashville as a medical student. He began performing as one half of a comedy duo, Miller and Lyles, with his friend Flournoy Miller. From 1905, Miller and Lyles were hired by impresario Robert T. Motts to be resident playwrights with the Pekin Theater Stock Company in Chicago. They performed with the company in blackface, and in the show The Colored Aristocrats introduced the characters Steve Jenkins (Miller) and Sam Peck (Lyles), with which they would be associated for many years.

In 1909, Miller and Lyles traveled to New York City, where they started to perform on the vaudeville circuit, uniquely relying on comic performances rather than incorporating song and dance. They developed comedy devices later copied by others, such as a prizefighting routine which contrasted Miller's height and Lyles' short stature; completing each other's sentences; and "mutilatin'" the language in their phraseology. In 1915, they appeared in André Charlot's production Charlot's Revue in England, and upon their return to the U.S. appeared with Abbie Mitchell in Darkydom, a musical with score by James Reese Europe that was the first major black musical comedy.

For several years they continued to work together on the Keith vaudeville circuit, as well as writing and producing plays. In 1921 they presented Shuffle Along, a Broadway musical with music by Eubie Blake and lyrics by Noble Sissle. The show "set the style for more than a decade, inspiring many imitations," and showcased the song "I'm Just Wild About Harry". Miller and Lyles also starred in the show, as Steve Jenkins and Sam Peck. Also in 1921, Orlando Kellum made a short film with Miller and Lyles performing their song "De Ducks" in Kellum's short-lived Photokinema sound-on-disc process.

Shuffle Along ran in theatres until 1924. Between 1922 and 1925, Miller and Lyles also made a number of recordings for the OKeh label. The pair wrote a three-act play, The Flat Below, and Miller also wrote another play, Going White. Miller and Lyles continued to work together for several years writing and performing in Broadway shows including Runnin' Wild – one of the first shows to popularize the Charleston, in 1923, with a score by James P. Johnson – Rang Tang (1927), which they co-directed; and Keep Shuffling (1928) which featured music by Fats Waller. They split up the act in 1928 but later reunited to perform on radio, and threatened to sue Freeman Gosden and Charles Correll, writers and performers of the Amos 'n' Andy radio show, for plagiarising their act. They also started to put together a new show, Shuffle Along of 1933.

Lyles died in New York City in July 1932 of pulmonary tuberculosis, at the age of 48.

== Filmography ==
- They Know Their Groceries (1929), Vitaphone Varieties short starring F. E. Miller an Aubrey Lyles as grocers. Bryan Foy directed

== See also ==
- African American musical theater
- Black Vaudeville
