= Flournoy Miller =

American entertainer and playwright (1885–1971)

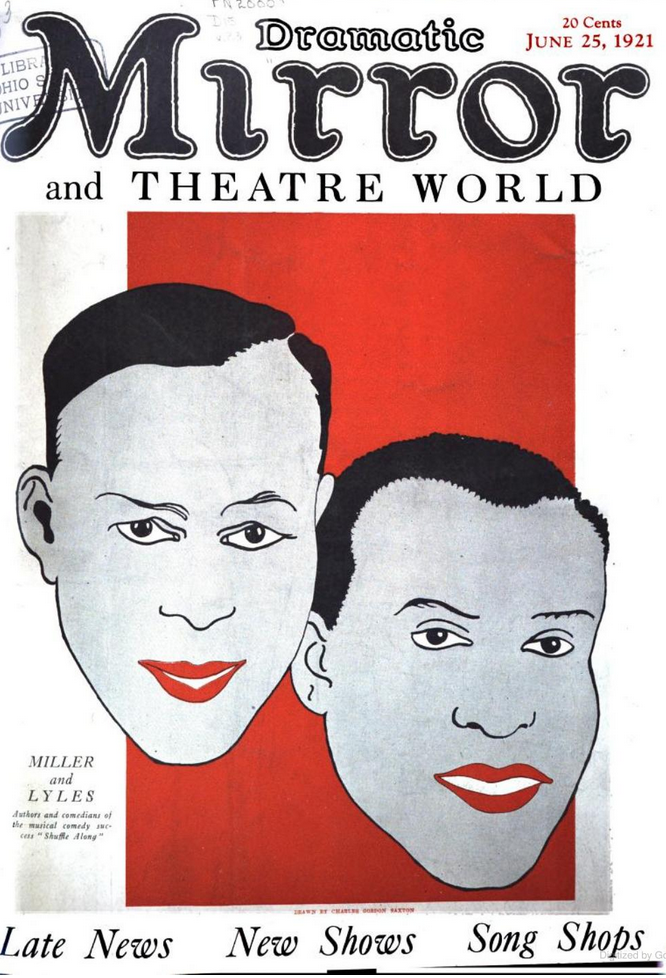
- Miller and Lyles, from the cover of Dramatic Mirror (June 25, 1921), illustration by Charles Gordon Saxton
- Born: Flournoy Eakin Miller; April 14, 1885; Columbia, Tennessee, United States
- Died: June 6, 1971 (aged 86); Hollywood, California, US
- Other name: F. E. Miller
- Occupations: Vaudeville entertainer, actor, playwright, theatre producer
- Children: Olivette Miller

Flournoy Eakin Miller (14 April 1885 – 6 June 1971), sometimes credited as F. E. Miller, was an American entertainer, actor, lyricist, producer and playwright. Between about 1905 and 1932 he formed a popular comic duo, Miller and Lyles, with Aubrey Lyles. Described as "an innovator who advanced black comedy and entertainment significantly," and as "one of the seminal figures in the development of African American musical theater on Broadway", he wrote many successful vaudeville and Broadway shows, including the influential Shuffle Along (1921), as well as working on several all-black movies between the 1930s and 1950s.

== Biography ==
He was born in Columbia, Tennessee, the second son of the editor of a black newspaper. His older brother Irvin C. Miller also became a noted vaudeville performer and theatre producer. He studied at Fisk University in Nashville, where he began performing as one half of a comedy duo Miller and Lyles with his childhood friend Aubrey Lyles. From 1905, Miller and Lyles were hired by impresario Robert T. Motts to be resident playwrights with the Pekin Theater Stock Company in Chicago. They performed with the company in blackface, and in the show The Colored Aristocrats, introducing the characters Steve Jenkins (Miller) and Sam Peck (Lyles) with which they would be associated for many years.

With Marion A. Brooks, Miller founded the Bijou Stock Company in Montgomery, Alabama in 1908. One of the first black theatre companies in the South, it folded soon afterwards and Miller returned to Chicago. In 1909, Miller and Lyles traveled to New York City, where they started to perform on one of the vaudeville circuits, uniquely relying on comic performances rather than incorporating song and dance. They developed comedy devices later copied by others, such as a prizefighting routine which contrasted Miller's height and Lyles' short stature; completing each other's sentences; and "mutilatin'" the language in their phraseology. In 1915, they appeared in André Charlot's production Charlot's Revue in England, and upon their return to the U.S. appeared with Abbie Mitchell in Darkydom, a musical with score by James Reese Europe that was the first major black musical comedy.

For several years they continued to work together on the Keith vaudeville circuit, as well as writing and producing plays.

Miller's script for The Mayor of Dixie was the basis for Shuffle Along which premiered in 1921, a Broadway musical with music by Eubie Blake and lyrics by Noble Sissle. The show "set the style for more than a decade, inspiring many imitations," and showcased the song "I'm Just Wild About Harry". Miller and Lyles also starred in the show, as Steve Jenkins and Sam Peck. Although the book for Shuffle Along is credited to Miller and Lyles, Miller was the principal author. Shuffle Along ran in theatres until 1924.

Also in 1921, Orlando Kellum made a short film with Miller and Lyles performing their song "De Ducks" in Kellum's short-lived Photokinema sound-on-disc process. Between 1922 and 1925, Miller and Lyles also made a number of recordings for the OKeh label. The pair wrote a three-act play, The Flat Below, and Miller also wrote another play, Going White. Miller and Lyles continued to work together for several years writing and performing in Broadway shows including Runnin' Wild – one of the first shows to popularize the Charleston, in 1923, with a score by James P. Johnson – Rang Tang (1927), which they co-directed; and Keep Shuffling (1928) which featured music by Fats Waller. They split up the act in 1928, while Miller worked with Eubie Blake in Lew Leslie's Blackbirds of 1930 on Broadway. Miller and Lyles later reunited to perform on radio, and also threatened to sue Freeman Gosden and Charles Correll, writers and performers of the Amos 'n' Andy radio show, for plagiarising their act. However, the case was dropped after Lyles' death in 1932, at a time when the duo were trying to put together a new show, Shuffle Along of 1933. By 1942, Miller had accepted a job with Gosden and Correll as a writer for the radio show.

During the 1930s, Miller became increasingly involved with the film industry, working in particular with the comedian Mantan Moreland with whom he also performed in vaudeville. He performed in, and wrote for, several all-black movies between the 1930s and 1950s, including the Westerns Harlem on the Prairie (1937), Harlem Rides the Range (1939), and The Bronze Buckaroo (1939). He moved to Hollywood, but retained an interest in theatrical productions, including presenting the unsuccessful show Shuffle Along of 1952. Miller appeared alongside Scatman Crothers in the minstrel review short film Yes Sir, Mr. Bones (1951). He also worked with the producers of Amos 'n' Andy, becoming a script consultant and recommending Tim Moore to take the starring role in the TV version.

Miller married Bessie Oliver in 1912. He died in Hollywood in 1971, aged 86. The jazz harpist Olivette Miller was his daughter, and playwright-librettist Sandra Seaton is also a relative.

== Influence and commemoration ==
Miller was posthumously nominated for a Tony Award in 1979 for his contributions to musical theater, as described in Eubie!, based on the life of Eubie Blake. The book Reminiscing with Sissle and Blake by William Bolcom and Robert Kimball (Viking Press, 1973), tells the story of Flournoy Miller and Aubrey Lyles's involvement with Shuffle Along.

== Filmography ==
- They Know Their Groceries (1929), Vitaphone Varieties short co-starring Aubrey Lyles. Bryan Foy directed
- That's the Spirit (1933)
- Harlem on the Prairie (1937)
- Harlem Rides the Range (1939)
- The Bronze Buckaroo (1939)
- Lucky Ghost (1942)
- Mr. Washington Goes to Town (1942)
- Professor Creeps (1942)
- Stormy Weather (1943)
- Yes Sir, Mr. Bones (1951)

== See also ==
- African American musical theater
- Black Vaudeville
