= Irvin C. Miller =

American actor, playwright and producer (1884–1975)

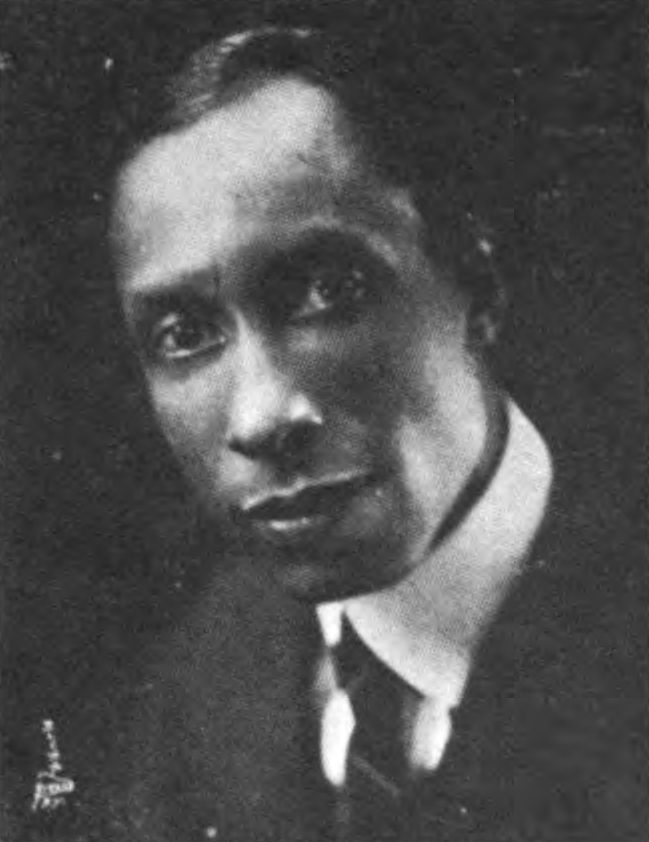
- Miller c. 1924
- Born: Irvin Colloden Miller; February 19, 1884; Columbia, Tennessee, U.S.
- Died: February 27, 1975 (aged 91); St. Joseph, Michigan, U.S.
- Occupation(s): Vaudeville entertainer, playwright, and theatre producer

Irvin Colloden Miller (February 19, 1884 – February 27, 1975) was an American actor, playwright, and vaudeville show writer and producer. He was responsible for successful theater shows including Broadway Rastus (1921), Liza (1922), Dinah (1923), which introduced the wildly popular black bottom dance, and Desires of 1927 starring Adelaide Hall. For thirty years he directed the popular review, Brown Skin Models, influenced by the Ziegfeld Follies but exclusively using black performers. "In the 1920s and 1930s, he was arguably the most well-established and successful producer of black musical comedy."

== Biography ==
Miller was born in Columbia, Tennessee, the son of the editor of the Nashville Globe, a black weekly newspaper. Irvin's younger brothers Flournoy Eakin Miller (1885-1971) and Quintard Gailor Miller (1895-1979) also became theatrical performers and producers.

Irvin studied at Fisk University in Nashville, graduating in 1904. The following year, he started performing with the Pekin Stock Company in Chicago, where he appeared in Colored Aristocrats, written by his brother Flournoy with his stage partner Aubrey Lyles. He then moved to New Orleans and performed with Scott's Black American Troubadours, with whom he wrote a successful musical play, Happy Sam from Bam.

In 1913 he began touring in vaudeville with singer Esther Bigeou; they later married. Miller and Bigeou divorced in 1918, and he married chorus girl Blanche Thompson the following year.

After his marriage in 1913, Irvin returned to Chicago, Irvin Miller performed with Kid Brown's company and wrote a musical comedy, Mr. Ragtime, in which he performed. He then wrote a new show, Broadway Rastus, first performed in Philadelphia in 1915. It was highly successful, and brought Miller fame. The show moved to Atlantic City where it featured performers including Leigh Whipper and Lottie Grady, and included music by W. C. Handy. Productions of Broadway Rastus continued on a regular basis until the late 1920s.

His next show, Put and Take (1920), with music by Spencer Williams, was a failure and he returned to performing in vaudeville with Emmett Anthony, at the same time as writing a show, Liza, in which he performed with Anthony. The show opened in 1922 and was a success, "credited as the first black musical comedy owned and produced on Broadway entirely by black capital." In 1923, he wrote and produced the highly successful stage show Dinah, which introduced the Black Bottom dance craze. Within months, the dance was being performed in society balls in New York.

Miller "specialized in revues featuring beautiful showgirls, snappy dancing, and comedy". It has been said of him that he "had a unique ability to locate pretty girls and talented performers for his shows; and he gave Black audiences exactly what they wanted when they came to the theatre."

In 1925, Miller started an annual show, Brown Skin Models, inspired by the Ziegfeld Follies but glorifying attractive black women. The show toured the country with great success for forty weeks a year, and during the Second World War toured army camps as part of the United Service Organizations (USO). Although the shows included song, dance, and comedy, the focus was on the models themselves, who "did not necessarily sing or dance [but] merely appeared in costume, walked across the stage, and posed."

The show was hailed by the Chicago Defender as a radical departure from stereotyped plantation song and dance shows, and according to researcher Elspeth Brown presented "a public, commercialized sexuality that made claims on both New Negro modernity and upper-class, artistic signifiers to rewrite the meanings of black femininity." Miller continued to produce versions of the show, with his wife Blanche Thompson, who was one of the leading models, until he retired around 1955.

A succession of other shows were produced in his name from the 1920s until the mid-1940s, of variable quality and some having minimal input from Miller himself. In 1927-28 alone he mounted ten different shows for the Theater Owners Booking Association (TOBA). He was adept at gaining publicity, for instance by proposing to build a home for unmarried chorus girls and their children. He also helped establish the Official Theatrical World, a directory of African-American performers, and in 1929 became President of the Florence Mills Theatrical Society. The following year he appeared in the all-black film Dark-Town Scandals Revue, produced by Oscar Micheaux. In 1930, he staged his brother Flournoy Miller's successful show, Shuffle Along.

He settled in Benton Harbor, Michigan, in the 1940s, and died in nearby St. Joseph in 1975, aged 91; reports stating that he died in 1967 are in error. Blanche Thompson died in 1987.
