= Ella Fitzgerald singles discography =

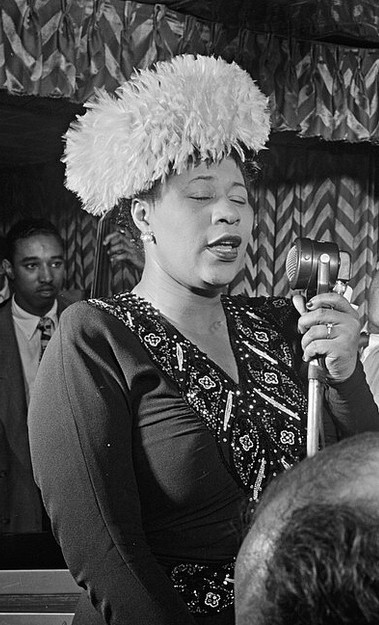
- Ella Fitzgerald in 1947.
- Singles: 166
- Other charting songs: 6

The singles discography of American singer Ella Fitzgerald contains 166 singles and six other charting songs. Between 1935 and 1955, American singer Ella Fitzgerald was signed to Decca Records. Her early recordings as a featured vocalist were frequently uncredited. Her first credited single was the 78 RPM recording of "I'll Chase the Blues Away" in 1935 with the Chick Webb Orchestra. Fitzgerald continued recording with Webb until his death in 1939, after which the band was renamed Ella Fitzgerald and Her Famous Orchestra. The first charting songs were however recorded in march 1936 with an octet conducted by Teddy Wilson: "All My Life" charted and "My Melancholy Baby" became her first US top ten entry. With the Webb's band Ella Fitzgerald get to the top of US charts in 1938 with "A-Tisket, A-Tasket". Then she reached the top ten three more times with Webb, including the top five single "F.D.R. Jones". She also made the US charts three times under the title Ella Fitzgerald and Her Savoy Eight, actually and octet with Webb's band menbesrs and her own orchestra, the Webb band after the death of the leader. Fitzgerald reached again the top ten in 1939 with "I Want the Waiter (With the Water)" and in 1940 with "Five O'Clock Whistle".

During the 1940s decade, Fitzgerald made the US top ten ten more times. Most of these recordings were collaborations, notably topping the charts with The Ink Spots in 1944: "Into Each Life Some Rain Must Fall" and "I'm Making Believe". She also reached the top ten alongside The Song Spinners and The Delta Rhythm Boys on songs like "It's Only a Paper Moon", "(I Love You) For Sentimental Reasons" and "My Happiness". Alongside Louis Jordan, she reached the US top ten with "Stone Cold Dead in the Market (He Had It Coming)" and "Baby, It's Cold Outside". Additionally, singles like "It's Too Soon to Know" and "That's My Desire" placed in the top five on the US R&B chart.

During the 1950s decade, Fitzgerald made the US top 40 six times with titles like "Smooth Sailing", "Trying" and "Melancholy Me". Her most successful US single was 1953's "Crying in the Chapel", which rose to number 15 on the US chart. In Australia, Fitzgerald found greater commercial success with the top ten entries "A Guy Is a Guy", "Because of Rain" and "A Satisfied Mind". Her 1958 single "The Swingin' Shepherd Blues" made the UK pop chart, climbing to number 15. In the 1960s decade, Fitzgerald had her only US top 40 single with "Mack the Knife", which rose to number 27. It also reached the top ten on the US R&B chart. Her singles continued making the charts until 1968's "I Taught Him Everything He Knows".

== Singles ==
=== 1930s ===
List of singles, with selected chart positions, showing other relevant details
Title	Year	Peak chart positions	Album
Title	Year	US	Album
"All My Life" (with Teddy Wilson and His Orchesta)	1936	13	non-album singles
"My Melancholy Baby" (with Teddy Wilson and His Orchesta)	1936	6	non-album singles
"Crying My Heart Out for You" (with Chick Webb and His Orchestra)	1936	—	non-album singles
"Sing Me a Swing Song (And Let Me Dance)" (with Chick Webb and His Orchestra)	1936	18	non-album singles
"A Little Bit Later On" (with Chick Webb and His Orchestra)	1936	—	non-album singles
"Darktown Strutters' Ball" (as Ella Fitzgerald and Her Savoy Eight)	1936	—	non-album singles
"I Got the Spring Fever Blues" (with Chick Webb and His Orchestra)	1937	—	non-album singles
"Oh Yes? Take Another Guess" (with Chick Webb and His Orchestra)	1937	—	non-album singles
"Dedicated to You" (with The Mills Brothers)	1937	19	non-album singles
"You Showed Me the Way" (with Chick Webb and His Orchestra)	1937	—	non-album singles
"If You Should Ever Leave" (as Ella Fitzgerald and Her Savoy Eight)	1937	12	non-album singles
"All Over Nothing at All" (as Ella Fitzgerald and Her Savoy Eight)	1937	20	non-album singles
"Rock It for Me" (with Chick Webb and His Orchestra)	1937	19	non-album singles
"I Want to Be Happy" (with Chick Webb and His Orchestra)	1938	—	non-album singles
"The Dipsy Doodle" (with Chick Webb and His Orchestra)	1938	—	non-album singles
"It's My Turn Now" (with as Ella Fitzgerald and Her Savoy Eight)	1938	—	non-album singles
"It's Wonderful" (with as Ella Fitzgerald and Her Savoy Eight)	1938	—	non-album singles
"I Got a Guy" (with Chick Webb and His Orchestra)	1938	18	non-album singles
"If Dreams Come True" (with Chick Webb and His Orchestra)	1938	—	non-album singles
"It's Time to Be Real" (with as Ella Fitzgerald and Her Savoy Eight)	1938	—	non-album singles
"A-Tisket, A-Tasket" (with Chick Webb and His Orchestra)	1938	1	non-album singles
"I've Been (Saving Myself for You)" (with as Ella Fitzgerald and Her Savoy Eight)	1938	—	non-album singles
"Everybody Step" (with Chick Webb and His Orchestra)	1938	—	non-album singles
"I'm Just a Jitterbug" (with Chick Webb and His Orchestra)	1938	—	non-album singles
"(Oh! Oh!) What Do You Know About Love" (with as Ella Fitzgerald and Her Savoy Eight)	1938	—	non-album singles
"MacPherson Is Rehearsin' (To Swing)" (with Chick Webb and His Orchestra)	1938	14	non-album singles
"Woe Is Me" (with as Ella Fitzgerald and Her Savoy Eight)	1938	—	non-album singles
"F.D.R. Jones" (with Chick Webb and His Orchestra)	1938	8	non-album singles
"I Found My Yellow Basket" (with Chick Webb and His Orchestra)	1938	3	non-album singles
"Gotta Pebble in My Shoe" (with Chick Webb and His Orchestra)	1939	—	non-album singles
"My Heart Belongs to Daddy" (with Chick Webb and His Orchestra)	1939	—	non-album singles
"'Tain't What You Do (It's the Way That You Do It)" (with Chick Webb and His Orchestra)	1939	19	non-album singles
"Undecided" (with Chick Webb and His Orchestra)	1939	8	non-album singles
"Chew, Chew, Chew (Your Bubble Gum)" (with Chick Webb and His Orchestra)	1939	14	non-album singles
"Don't Worry 'Bout Me" (with as Ella Fitzgerald and Her Savoy Eight)	1939	—	non-album singles
"Little White Lies" (with Chick Webb and His Orchestra)	1939	—	non-album singles
"That Was My Heart" (with Chick Webb and His Orchestra)	1939	—	non-album singles
"I Want the Waiter (With the Water)" (with as Ella Fitzgerald and Her Famous Orchestra)	1939	9	non-album singles
"My Last Goodbye" (with as Ella Fitzgerald and Her Famous Orchestra)	1939	—	non-album singles
"My Wubba Dolly (Rubber Dolly)" (with as Ella Fitzgerald and Her Famous Orchestra)	1939	16	non-album singles
"—" denotes a recording that did not chart or was not released in that territory.

=== 1940s ===
List of singles, with selected chart positions, showing other relevant details
Title	Year	Peak chart positions		Album
Title	Year	US	US R&B	Album
"What's the Matter with Me" (as Ella Fitzgerald and Her Famous Orchestra)	1940	—	—	non-album singles
"Starlit Hour" (as Ella Fitzgerald and Her Famous Orchestra)	1940	17	—	non-album singles
"Sing Song Swing" (as Ella Fitzgerald and Her Famous Orchestra)	1940	23	—	non-album singles
"Imagination" (as Ella Fitzgerald and Her Famous Orchestra)	1940	15	—	non-album singles
"Baby, Won't You Please Come Home" (as Ella Fitzgerald and Her Famous Orchestra)	1940	—	—	non-album singles
"Shake Down the Stars" (as Ella Fitzgerald and Her Famous Orchestra)	1940	18	—	non-album singles
"Take It from the Top" (as Ella Fitzgerald and Her Famous Orchestra)	1940	—	—	non-album singles
"Gulf Coast Blues" (as Ella Fitzgerald and Her Famous Orchestra)	1940	—	—	non-album singles
"Five O'Clock Whistle" (as Ella Fitzgerald and Her Famous Orchestra)	1940	9	—	non-album singles
"Louisville, K.Y." (as Ella Fitzgerald and Her Famous Orchestra)	1940	23	—	non-album singles
"Cabin in the Sky" (as Ella Fitzgerald and Her Famous Orchestra)	1940	—	—	non-album singles
"The One I Love (Belongs to Somebody Else)" (as Ella Fitzgerald and Her Famous Orchestra)	1941	—	—	non-album singles
"Hello Ma! I Done It Again" (as Ella Fitzgerald and Her Famous Orchestra)	1941	26	—	non-album singles
"The Muffin Man" (as Ella Fitzgerald and Her Famous Orchestra)	1941	23	—	non-album singles
"Melinda the Mouse" (as Ella Fitzgerald and Her Famous Orchestra)	1941	—	—	non-album singles
"Keep Cool, Fool" (as Ella Fitzgerald and Her Famous Orchestra)	1941	—	—	non-album singles
"You Don't Know What Love Is"	1941	—	—	non-album singles
"My Man (Mon Homme)" (as Ella Fitzgerald and Her Famous Orchestra)	1942	—	—	non-album singles
"I'm Gettin' Mighty Lonesome for You" (as Ella Fitzgerald and Her Four Keys)	1942	—	—	non-album singles
"All I Need Is You" (as Ella Fitzgerald and Her Four Keys)	1942	—	—	non-album singles
"I Can't Believe That You're in Love with Me" (as Ella Fitzgerald and Her Famous Orchestra)	1942	—	—	non-album singles
"(I Put) A Four Leaf Clover in Your Pocket" (as Ella Fitzgerald and the Four Keys)	1942	—	—	non-album singles
"My Heart and I Decided" (as Ella Fitzgerald and the Keys)	1943	—	6	non-album singles
"Cow-Cow Boogie" (with The Ink Spots)	1944	10	1	non-album singles
"Once Too Often"	1944	—	—	non-album singles
"I'm Making Believe" (with The Ink Spots)	1944	1	2	non-album singles
"And Her Tears Flowed Like Wine" (with The Song Spinners)	1944	10	—	non-album singles
"I'm Beginning to See the Light" (with The Ink Spots)	1945	5	—	non-album singles
"It's Only a Paper Moon" (with The Delta Rhythm Boys)	1945	9	4	non-album singles
"A Kiss Goodnight" (with Randy Brooks and His Orchestra)	1945	—	—	non-album singles
"The Frim Fram Sauce" (with Louis Armstrong)	1946	—	4	non-album singles
"I'm Just a Lucky So-and-So" (with Billy Kyle and His Orchestra)	1946	—	—	non-album singles
"Stone Cold Dead in the Market (He Had It Coming)" (with Louis Jordan)	1946	7	1	non-album singles
"(I Love You) For Sentimental Reasons" (with The Delta Rhythm Boys)	1946	8	—	non-album singles
"Guilty" (with Eddie Heywood and His Orchestra)	1947	11	—	non-album singles
"That's My Desire" (with Andy Love Quintet)	1947	—	3	non-album singles
"Oh, Lady Be Good!" (with Bob Haggett and His Orchestra)	1947	—	—	non-album singles
"I Got It Bad (and That Ain't Good)"	1947	—	—	non-album singles
"Stairway to the Stars"	1947	—	—	non-album singles
"I've Got a Feeling I'm Falling" (with The Day Dreamers)	1948	—	—	non-album singles
"My Happiness" (with The Song Spinners)	1948	6	—	non-album singles
"It's Too Soon to Know"	1948	—	6	non-album singles
"To Make a Mistake Is Human"	1948	—	—	non-album singles
"Robbins Nest"	1949	—	—	non-album singles
"Baby, It's Cold Outside" (with Louis Jordan)	1949	9	6	non-album singles
"Black Coffee" (with orchestra under the conduction of Gordon Jenkins)	1949	—	—	non-album singles
"Foolish Tears"	1949	—	—	non-album singles
"In the Evening (When the Sun Goes Down)" (with Sy Oliver and His Orchestra)	1949	—	—	non-album singles
"—" denotes a recording that did not chart or was not released in that territory.

=== 1950s ===
List of singles, with selected chart positions, showing other relevant details
Title	Year	Peak chart positions				Album
Title	Year	US	US R&B	AUS	UK	Album
"I Hadn't Anyone Till You"	1950	—	—	—	—	non-album singles
"M-I-S-S-I-S-S-I-P-P-I" (as Ella Fitzgerald with 4 Hits and a Miss)	1950	—	—	—	—	non-album singles
"I'll Never Be Free" (with Louis Jordan and The Tympany Five)	1950	—	7	—	—	non-album singles
"Can Anyone Explain (No, No, No)" (with Louis Armstrong)	1950	—	30	—	—	non-album singles
"Santa Claus Got Stuck (In My Chimney)"	1950	—	—	—	—	non-album singles
"I Still Feel the Same About You" (with The Ink Spots)	1951	—	—	—	—	non-album singles
"The Hot Canary" (with Sy Oliver and His Orchestra)	1951	—	—	—	—	non-album singles
"Even as You and I"	1951	—	—	—	—	non-album singles
"Come On-a My House"	1951	—	—	—	—	non-album singles
"Smooth Sailing"	1951	23	3	—	—	non-album singles
"A Guy Is a Guy"	1952	—	—	5	—	non-album singles
"Goody Goody" / "Air Mail Special"	1952	—	—	—	—	non-album singles
"Because of Rain"	1952	—	—	7	—	non-album singles
"Undecided"	1952	—	—	12	—	non-album singles
"Trying"	1952	22	—	11	—	non-album singles
"Walkin' by the River"	1952	29	—	—	—	non-album singles
"Who Walks in When I Walk Out" (with Louis Armstrong)	1953	—	—	—	—	non-album singles
"Careless"	1953	—	—	—	—	non-album singles
"Crying in the Chapel"	1953	15	—	—	—	non-album singles
"If You Can't Sing It You'll Have to Swing It"	1953	—	—	—	—	non-album singles
"The Greatest There Is"	1953	—	—	—	—	non-album singles
A Sunday Kind of Love"	1954	—	—	—	—	non-album singles
"Melancholy Me"	1954	25	—	—	—	non-album singles
"I Need"	1954	30	—	—	—	non-album singles
"Who's Afraid? (Not I, Not I, Not I)" (with Gordon Jenkins)	1954	—	—	—	—	non-album singles
"Lullaby of Birdland"	1954	—	—	18	—	Lullabies of Birdland
"If You Don't I Know Who Will"	1954	—	—	—	—	non-album single
"Moanin' Low"	1955	—	—	—	—	Sweet and Hot
"Lover, Come Back to Me"	1955	—	—	—	—	Sweet and Hot
"Pete Kelly's Blues"	1955	—	—	28	—	non-album singles
"A Satisfied Mind	1955	—	—	4	—	non-album singles
"But Not Like Mine"	1955	—	—	—	—	non-album singles
"(Love Is) The Tender Trap"	1955	—	—	—	—	non-album singles
"Early Autumn"	1956	—	—	—	—	non-album singles
"Too Young for the Blues"	1956	—	—	—	—	non-album singles
"A Beautiful Friendship"	1956	74	—	—	—	non-album singles
"The Silent Treatment"	1956	—	—	—	—	non-album singles
"Can't We Be Friends?" (with Louis Armstrong)	1956	—	—	—	—	Ella and Louis
"Hear My Heart"	1957	—	—	—	—	non-album single
"Manhattan"	1957	—	—	—	—	Ella Fitzgerald Sings the Rodgers & Hart Song Book
"It's All Right with Me"	1957	—	—	—	—	non-album single
"Midnight Sun"	1957	—	—	—	—	Like Someone in Love
"The Swingin' Shepherd Blues"	1958	—	—	—	15	non-album single
"Trav'lin' Light"	1958	—	—	—	—	non-album single
"Dreams Are Made for Children"	1958	—	—	—	—	non-album single
"Little Jazz"	1959	—	—	—	—	non-album single
"I'm Thru with Love"	1959	—	—	—	—	Hello Love
"But Not for Me"	1959	—	—	—	25	Ella Fitzgerald Sings the George and Ira Gershwin Song Book
"The Secret of Christmas"	1959	—	—	—	—	non-album single
"Like Young"	1959	—	—	—	—	Get Happy!
"—" denotes a recording that did not chart or was not released in that territory.

=== 1960s and 1970s ===
List of singles, with selected chart positions, showing other relevant details
Title	Year	Peak chart positions							Album
Title	Year	US	US AC	US R&B	AUS	BEL	GER	UK	Album
"Mack the Knife"	1960	27	—	6	63	—	—	19	Ella in Berlin: Mack the Knife
"How High the Moon Part 1"	1960	76	—	—	—	—	—	46	Ella in Berlin: Mack the Knife
"Reach for Tomorrow"	1960	—	—	—	—	—	—	—	Ella Fitzgerald Sings Songs from the Soundtrack of "Let No Man Write My Epitaph"
"Jingle Bells"	1960	—	—	—	—	—	—	—	Ella Wishes You a Swinging Christmas
"(You'll Have To Swing It) Mr. Paganini"	1961	103	20	—	—	11	—	—	Ella in Hollywood
"Clap Hands (Here Comes Charlie!)"	1961	—	—	—	—	—	—	—	Clap Hands, Here Comes Charlie!
"Call Me Darling"	1962	—	—	—	—	—	—	—	non-album single
"I'll Always Be in Love with You"	1962	—	—	—	—	—	—	—	Rhythm Is My Business
"Desafinado (Slightly Out Of Tune)"	1962	102	—	—	83	16	—	38	non-album singles
"Bill Bailey, Won't You Please Come Home"	1963	75	—	—	—	—	—	—	non-album singles
"See, See Rider"	1964	—	—	—	—	—	—	—	These Are the Blues
"Can't Buy Me Love"	1964	—	—	—	—	—	24	34	Hello, Dolly!
"Ringo Beat"	1964	127	—	—	—	—	—	—	non-album singles
"She's Just a Quiet Girl (Mae)"	1965	—	—	—	—	—	—	—	non-album singles
"A Hard Day's Night"	1965	—	—	—	—	—	—	—	Ella in Hamburg
"Imagine My Frustration (Part 1)" (with Duke Ellington)	1966	—	—	—	—	—	—	—	Ella at Duke's Place
"Duke's Place"	1966	—	—	—	—	—	—	—	Ella at Duke's Place
"These Boots Are Made for Walkin'"	1966	—	—	—	—	—	—	—	non-album single
"Whisper Not"	1967	—	—	—	—	—	—	—	Whisper Not
"Just a Closer Walk with Thee"	1967	—	—	—	—	—	—	—	Brighten the Corner
"I Taught Him Everything He Knows"	1968	—	22	—	—	—	—	—	Misty Blue
"Brighten the Corner Where You Are"	1968	—	—	—	—	—	—	—	Brighten the Corner
"It's Only Love"	1968	—	—	—	—	—	—	—	Misty Blue
"Get Ready"	1969	126	—	—	—	—	—	—	Ella
Sunshine of Your Love"	1969	—	—	—	—	—	—	—	non-album single
"I'll Never Fall in Love Again"	1969	—	—	—	—	—	—	—	Ella
"Try a Little Bit"	1970	—	—	—	—	—	—	—	non-album singles
"My Own Best Friend"	1975	—	—	—	—	—	—	—	non-album singles
"—" denotes a recording that did not chart or was not released in that territory.

== Other charted songs ==
List of songs, with selected chart positions, showing other relevant details
Title	Year	Peak chart positions				Album	Notes
Title	Year	US	US Cou.	US R&B	AUS	Album	Notes
"Big Boy Blue" (with The Mills Brothers)	1937	20	—	—	—	non-album singles	(Note: B-side to "Dedicated to You".)
"When My Sugar Walks Down the Street" (with The Ink Spots)	1944	27	2	—	—	non-album singles	(Note: B-side to "Cow-Cow Boogie".)
"Into Each Life Some Rain Must Fall" (with The Ink Spots)	1944	1	—	1	—	non-album singles	(Note: B-side to "I'm Making Believe".)
"Petootie Pie" (with Louis Jordan)	1946	—	—	3	—	non-album singles	(Note: B-side to "Stone Cold Dead in the Market (He Had It Coming)".)
Tea Leaves" (with The Song Spinners)	1948	24	—	—	—	non-album singles	(Note: B-side to "My Happiness".)
"Hello, Dolly!"	1964	125	—	—	94	Hello, Dolly!	(Note: B-side to "Can't Buy Me Love".)
"—" denotes a recording that did not chart or was not released in that territory.
