= Marilyn and Ella =

2008 play by Bonnie Greer

Marilyn and Ella is a 2008 play by Bonnie Greer. It is a musical drama about Marilyn Monroe and Ella Fitzgerald.

== Background ==
On March 15, 1955 Ella Fitzgerald opened her initial engagement at the Mocambo nightclub in Hollywood, after Marilyn Monroe lobbied the owner for the booking. The booking was instrumental in Fitzgerald's career. Bonnie Greer dramatized the incident as the musical drama, Marilyn and Ella, in 2008.

It has been widely reported that Fitzgerald was the first Black performer to play the Mocambo, following Monroe's intervention, but this is not true. African-American singers Herb Jefferies, Eartha Kitt, and Joyce Bryant all played the Mocambo in 1952 and 1953, according to stories published at the time in Jet magazine and Billboard.
