= Ella The Ungovernable =

Speculative historical fiction play

Ella The Ungovernable is a play by David McDonald that tells a fictional story of 15-year-old Ella Fitzgerald's incarceration and theorized escape from the New York Training School for Girls in Hudson, New York, in 1933. It is a piece of speculative historical fiction based on two different articles: "Ward of the State: The Gap In Ella Fitzgerald's Life," a 1996 New York Times story by Nina Bernstein and "The Ungovernable Ella Fitzgerald," a research article composed by The Prison Public Memory Project. The play explores what might have happened during the time of Fitzgerald's incarceration and the weeks following her escape.

== Background ==
Fitzgerald herself never talked about this period of her life. It was only Nina Bernstein's article for The New York Times, written only two weeks after Fitzgerald's death, which uncovered the story. According to The New York Times and The Prison Public Memory Project, 15-year-old Ella had been living on the streets of Harlem, working as a lookout either for a bordello or a bookie, when she was picked up by the police, eventually being sent upstate to the New York Training School for Girls, where conditions were notoriously bad.

After a year of incarceration, Fitzgerald was somehow able to escape and again, ended up on the streets of Harlem. Weeks later, she was convinced by a friend to attend the first-ever Amateur Night at the Apollo Theater, founded by the legendary Ralph Cooper. After initially wanting to perform as a dancer, she sang instead, covering a tune by The Boswell Sisters. To everyone's surprise, she ended up winning, and bandleader Chick Webb happened to be sitting in the audience. He offered her a job as his lead singer on the spot, they soon recorded the song "A-Tisket, A-Tasket," which soon became a hit worldwide. Eventually, according to Nina Bernstein's article in The New York Times, Fitzgerald was paroled by the state of New York to The Chick Webb Orchestra.

== Production ==
David McDonald wrote the initial screenplay to Ella The Ungovernable during the first Trump administration, both as a metaphor for African-American incarceration and a metaphor for life under Trump. After being unable to secure funding to make it into a film, a friend convinced McDonald to do Ella The Ungovernable as a play. Ella The Ungovernable is an attempt to mix art with activism as a tool for community building and empowerment. McDonald hopes to spread the play and its message of "Don't ever, ever, give up," around the world, to a world that is facing an increasing threat of fascism.

So far, there have been four productions of Ella The Ungovernable. The first was February 14 and 15, 2020, at The Valatie Community Theater in Valatie, New York. In 2021, the play was offered three weeks at Greenwich Village's Theater for the New City, but because of the COVID-19 pandemic, was forced to become a virtual event. The third iteration of the play was set to play at the 1,000-seat Bardavon 1869 Opera House in Poughkeepsie in 2022, but was cancelled due to the pandemic. Finally, the play received its New York City debut at Greenwich Village's Theater for the New City from June 20 to July 7, 2024.
