= Pat Thomas (singer) =

- Born: Patricia Thomas
- Years active: 1960s
- Labels: Verve, MGM, Strand

Pat Thomas was an American jazz singer from Chicago who had a hit with "Desafinado". She also recorded "The Long Long Night".

== Background ==
Born Patricia Thomas, and from Chicago, she appeared on the scene in 1961.

== Career ==
In October 1962, "Desafinado" (backed with "One Note Samba") was released on Verve Records. Also that month, Billboard Music Week magazine reported in its October 20 issue that her single "Desafinado" was doing very well. Then the single moved to another label. It was moved from the Verve label to MGM. Lennie Sheer the singles sales manager had stated in Billboard′s November 3 article that this was to enable more sales, and because Ella Fitzgerald had also released a version the previous week. By December 15, two versions of "Desafinado" were in the Hot 100 charts. Now on its 12th week, the version by Stan Getz and Charlie Byrd had dropped from number 18 to number 24. Her version had climbed from number 83 to number 78. There was even a version by Ella Fitzgerald bubbling under at number 102. As reported in the April 20, 1963, issue of Billboard, "Desafinado" from the album Slightly Out of Tune was a NARAS Award nominee in the Best Solo Performance Female category. In Canada her version was co-charted with the Stan Getz and Charlie Byrd version where they reached No. 14.

In October 1964, "Can't Wait Until I See My Baby's Face", backed with "The Long Long Night", was released on Verve. "Home in the Meadow", backed with "Where There's Love There's Hope", was released in 1967, also on Verve.

== Death ==
Patrica (Pat) Thomas died on Tuesday March 24, 1992, as a result of a heart attack. She was survived by her son, David Thomas and siblings Earl, George, Robert and sisters Marion Walker, Henriette Phillips, and Phylis Wordlaw.

== Discography ==
=== Albums ===
- Jazz Patterns - Strand Records - SL 1015 - 1961
- Desafinado - MGM Records SE 4103 - 1962
- Moody's Mood - MGM E-4206 - 1964
