= List of awards and nominations received by Ella Fitzgerald =

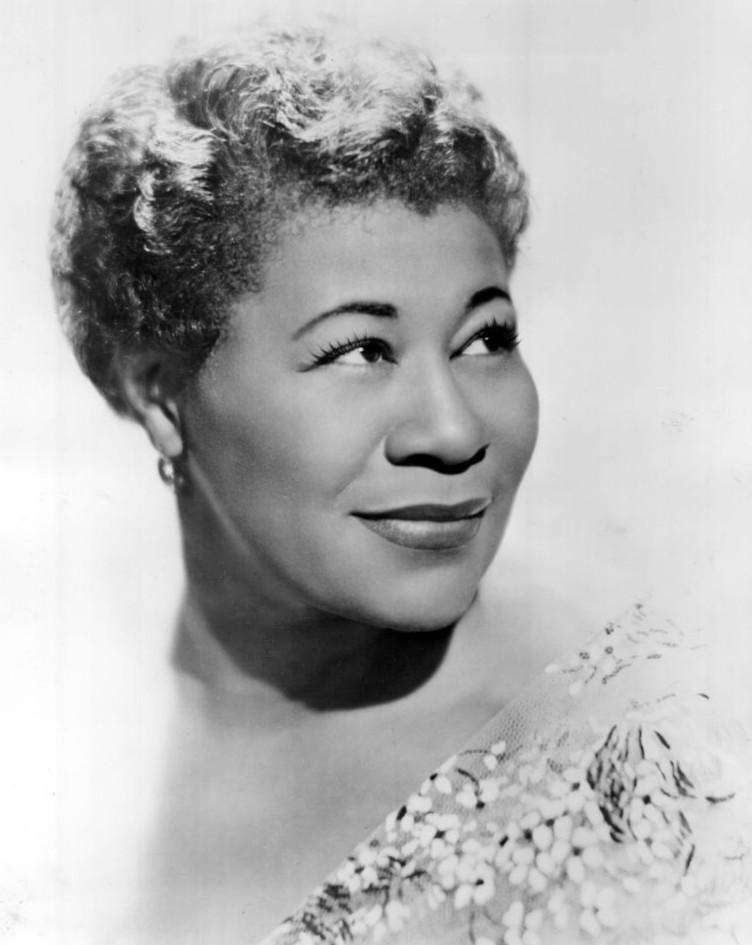
Fitzgerald in 1962

This article contains a list of awards and accolades won by and awarded to American jazz singer Ella Fitzgerald.

== Awards and accolades ==
=== Awards, citations and honors ===
National Medal of Arts

- Honorary membership of Alpha Kappa Alpha (1960)
- American Society of Composers, Authors and Publishers highest honor (1965)
- Bing Crosby Lifetime Achievement Award (1967)
- Hollywood Walk of Fame
- Honorary chairmanship of the Martin Luther King Foundation (1967)
- Award of Distinction from the National Association of Sickle cell Diseases (1976)
- Women at Work organization's Bicentennial Woman (1976)

Presidential Medal of Freedom

- Kennedand Jazz Hall of Fame (1979)
- Inductee into the Down Beat Jazz Hall of Fame (1979)
- Will Rogers award from the Beverly Hills Chamber of Commerce and Civic Association (1980)
- Lord & Taylor Rose award for outstanding contribution to music (1980)
- Doctor of Human Letters from Talladega College of Alabama (1980)
- Hasty Pudding Woman of the Year from Harvard (1982)
- George Peabody Medal for Outstanding Contributions to Music in America (1983)
- National Endowment for the Arts Jazz Masters award (1985)
- National Medal of Art awarded by President Ronald Reagan (1987)
- UCLA Medal for Musical Achievements (1987)
- NAACP Image Award (1988)
- The first Society of Singers Lifetime Achievement Award, named "Ella" in her honor (1989)
- Order of Arts and Letters, France (1990)
- Inductee into the National Women's Hall of Fame (1995)
- Presidential Medal of Freedom awarded by President George H. W. Bush
- National Academy of Recording Arts and Sciences' Lifetime Achievement Award
- Pied Piper Award
- George and Ira Gershwin Award for Outstanding Achievement
- Honorary doctorates from Harvard University, Yale University, Dartmouth, University of Maryland Eastern Shore, Howard University and Princeton
- VH1's 100 Greatest Women in Rock & Roll rank #13 (1999 – posthumous)

=== Grammy Awards ===
Fitzgerald won fourteen Grammy awards, including one for Lifetime Achievement in 1978

Grammy Award for Best Jazz Performance, Soloist:

- Ella Fitzgerald for Ella Fitzgerald Sings the Duke Ellington Songbook Kyndal

Grammy Award for Best Female Pop Vocal Performance:

- Ella Fitzgerald for Ella Fitzgerald Sings the Irving Berlin Songbook (1958)

Grammy Award for Best Female Pop Vocal Performance:

- Ella Fitzgerald for But Not for Me (from Ella Fitzgerald Sings the George and Ira Gershwin Songbook (1959)

Grammy Award for Best Jazz Performance, Soloist:

- Ella Fitzgerald for Ella Swings Lightly (1959)

Grammy Award for Best Female Pop Vocal Performance:

- Ella Fitzgerald for Ella in Berlin: Mack the Knife (1960)

Grammy Award for Best Female Pop Vocal Performance:

- Ella Fitzgerald for Mack the Knife (from Ella in Berlin: Mack the Knife) (1959)

Grammy Award for Best Female Pop Vocal Performance:

- Ella Fitzgerald for Ella Swings Brightly with Nelson (1962)

Grammy Award for Best Jazz Vocal:

- Ella Fitzgerald for Fitzgerald and Pass... Again (1976)

Grammy Award for Best Jazz Vocal:

- Ella Fitzgerald for Fine and Mellow (1979)

Grammy Award for Best Jazz Vocal Performance, Female:

- Ella Fitzgerald for A Perfect Match (1980)

Grammy Award for Best Jazz Vocal Performance, Female:

- Ella Fitzgerald for Digital III at Montreux (1981)

Grammy Award for Best Jazz Vocal Performance, Female:

- Ella Fitzgerald for The Best Is Yet to Come (1983)

Grammy Award for Best Jazz Vocal Performance, Female:

- Ella Fitzgerald for All That Jazz (1990)

Grammy Award for Best Historical Album:

- Ella Fitzgerald for The Complete Ella Fitzgerald Songbooks (1995)

=== Grammy Hall of Fame ===
Recordings of Ella Fitzgerald were inducted into the Grammy Hall of Fame, which is a special Grammy award established in 1973 to honor recordings that are at least twenty-five years old, and that have "qualitative or historical significance."

Grammy Hall of Fame
Year recorded	Title	Genre	Label	Year inducted	Notes
1960	"How High the Moon"	Jazz (Single)	Decca	2002	
1958	Porgy and Bess	Jazz (Album)	Verve	2001	with Louis Armstrong
1956	Ella Fitzgerald Sings the Cole Porter Songbook	Jazz (Album)	Verve	2000	
1957	Ella Fitzgerald Sings the Rodgers & Hart Songbook	Jazz (Album)	Verve	1999	
1960	Ella in Berlin	Jazz (Album)	Verve	1999	
1938	"A-Tisket, A-Tasket"	Jazz (Single)	Decca	1987	with Chick Webb and His Orchestra
