= Desafinado =

Bossa nova song by Antônio Carlos Jobim

"Desafinado" (a Portuguese word usually rendered into English as either "Out of Tune" or "Off Key") is a 1959 bossa nova song and jazz standard composed by Antônio Carlos Jobim with lyrics (in Portuguese) by Newton Mendonça.

First eight measures of Desafinado

== Background ==
"Desafinado" was a response to critics who claimed that the bossa nova genre was created for singers who cannot sing. The song has more than one English-language adaptation. Jon Hendricks, along with The Richmond Organisation (credited under the pseudonym "Jessie Cavanaugh"), created lyrics that employ consonance to reframe the concept as a love song about lovers who have fallen "slightly out of tune". Hendricks's lyrics were recorded by Ella Fitzgerald on her 1962 single, and by Perry Como on his 1963 album, The Songs I Love. Gene Lees's English version, which (though not a direct translation) is more closely aligned with Mendonça's original, appears on some recordings.

== Chart performance ==
The version by Stan Getz and Charlie Byrd (from the album Jazz Samba) was a major hit in 1962, reaching number 15 and number 4 on Billboard′s pop and easy-listening charts, respectively; their definitive rendering also reached number 11 in the UK. In Canada the song was co-charted with the Grammy nominated version by Pat Thomas where they reached No. 14.

=== Stan Getz and Charlie Byrd ===
Chart performance for "Desafinado" by Stan Getz and Charlie Byrd
Chart (1962)	Peak position
Canada CHUM Chart	14
UK Singles (The Official Charts Company)	11
US Billboard Easy Listening	4
US Billboard Hot 100	15

== Accolades ==
The song was voted by the Brazilian edition of Rolling Stone as the 14th greatest Brazilian song. The 1959 João Gilberto album Chega de Saudade contained the song and was inducted into the Latin Grammy Hall of Fame in 2001.

== Other recordings ==
- In 1962, Ella Fitzgerald's version charted at number 38.

== See also ==
- List of bossa nova standards
