= Tea Leaves =

Tea Leaves may refer to:

- Tea leaves
- Tea Leaves (Mad Men), an episode of the American television drama series Mad Men
- Tea Leaves (song), a 1948 song by Ella Fitzgerald, covered by many artists including Keely Smith
