= F.D.R. Jones =

Single by Chick Webb and His Orchestra with Ella Fitzgerald
- B-side: "I Love Each Move You Make"
- Released: 1938
- Recorded: October 6, 1938
- Genre: Swing music
- Label: Decca; 2105
- Songwriter: Harold Rome

Chick Webb and His Orchestra with Ella Fitzgerald singles chronology
"MacPherson Is Rehearsin' to Swing" (1938)	"F.D.R. Jones" (1938)	"Undecided" (1938)

"F.D.R. Jones" (sometimes "Franklin D. Roosevelt Jones"; originally titled "Man of the Year") is a 1938 satirical song written by Harold Rome. It was first recorded and released as a single by Ella Fitzgerald in 1938 and was performed by Judy Garland in blackface in the 1941 musical picture Babes on Broadway. The song satirizes the then contemporaneous practice of African American parents who named their children after Franklin D. Roosevelt, the 32nd President of the United States.

The song was written by Rome for his and Charles Friedman's 1938 satirical musical revue Sing out the News, where it was introduced by Rex Ingram and chorus and bandleader Hazel Scott. The song was performed in the musical in the context of a block party in Harlem. Rome's biographer, Tighe E. Zimmers, described the song as "Rome at his tuneful, liberal best, celebrating the birth of a black baby while paying homage to Franklin D. Roosevelt." It has also been described as "patronizing, if well-meant" by Guido van Rijn in his 1995 book Roosevelt's Blues: African-American Blues and Gospel Artists on President Franklin D. Roosevelt.

The song was first recorded by Chick Webb and His Orchestra with vocalist Ella Fitzgerald and released by Decca Records as catalog number 2105, with the flip side "I Love Each Move You Make". It was recorded by 16 other American and British vocalists within a year. Judy Garland released it as the B side to her 1941 single "How About You?" as Decca 4072.

Other satirical songs in the musical included "I Married a Republican" and "My Heart is Unemployed". Rome later contributed the song "Little Miss Victory Jones" to Howard Dietz and Vernon Duke's 1942 satirical revue Dancing in the Streets, but it was not perceived as successful as "F.D.R. Jones" being described by writer Louis Kronenberger as "more a puniest sort of stepsister" rather than a cousin to "F.D.R. Jones". "F.D.R. Jones" subsequently won an award from the American Society of Composers, Authors, and Publishers (ASCAP) as one of the best songs of 1938.

The song was extremely popular from its debut, and sold 70,000 sheet music copies. It was covered by Cab Calloway, Chick Webb, Flanagan & Allen, Glenn Miller, as well as Fitzgerald and Garland. In his 1994 book My Singing Teachers, singer Mel Tormé described Fitzgerald's version as one of his favourites that she recorded with the Chick Webb band and that she sang it with "great humor".

The songs popularity endured until World War II, it was subsequently sung by soldiers waiting to be evacuated after the Battle of Dunkirk in 1940 and broadcast with altered lyrics by the Nazi propagandist band Charlie and his Orchestra in January 1942 as part of an antisemitic attack on Roosevelt.

== Garland's Babes On Broadway performance ==
The song was performed as part of a minstrel medley by Judy Garland and Mickey Rooney in blackface in the 1941 musical film Babes on Broadway. The medley was subsequently described by Michael Feingold in a 1998 review of recent Garland reissues in the Village Voice as "otherwise unstomachable" apart from Garland's performance of the song which he felt was a "triumphant rendition...innocence joyously cubed and that "...she largely eschews the genre's racist mannerisms. It's just Judy, proud and happy, as a nonwhite male American, a role like other roles".

Feingold concluded that "Distressing as the sequence is, Judy's spirit gets past it. She does not seem to be playing to the blackface, as Jolson does in similar numbers; what stays in the memory is her vocal clarity (the crane shot climbs over a single bell-toned long note), not the horrific racist cartoon. It's the ultimate indication of her power to transcend: There's very little uglier than this in American pop culture, yet even here Judy can find a reserve of dignity, and not be brought down. She does not "sell" racism; at her bosses' behest, she merely wears its costumes".
