= Babes on Broadway =

1941 film by Vincente Minnelli, Busby Berkeley

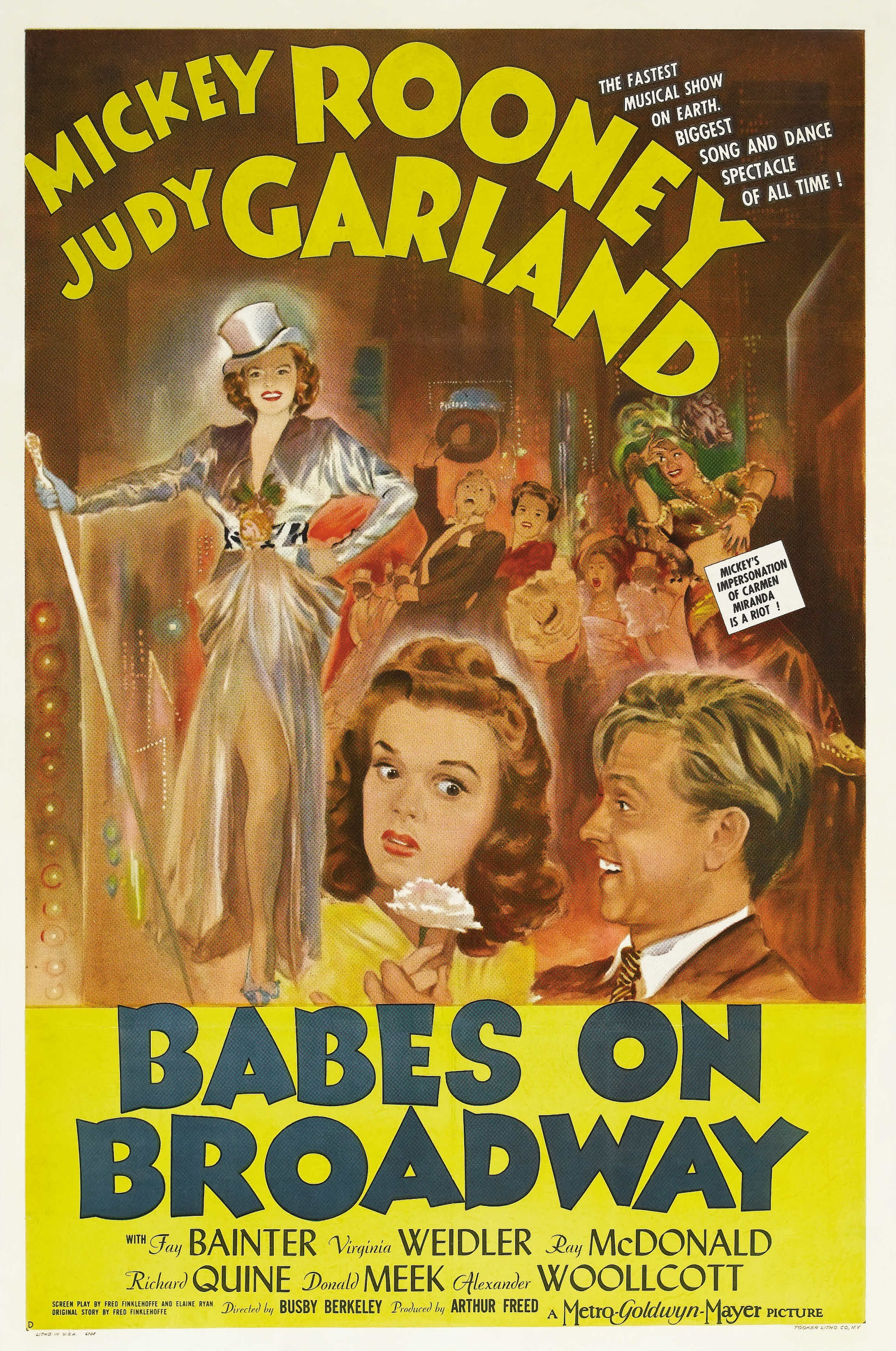
- Theatrical film poster by William Rose
- Directed by: Busby Berkeley; Vincente Minnelli (uncredited)
- Screenplay by: Fred F. Finklehoffe; Elaine Ryan
- Story by: Fred F. Finklehoffe
- Produced by: Arthur Freed
- Starring: Mickey Rooney; Judy Garland
- Cinematography: Lester White
- Edited by: Fredrick Y. Smith
- Music by: Score: Leo Arnaud; George Bassman; George Stoll (all uncredited); Songs: Burton Lane (music); Roger Edens (music); E.Y. Harburg (lyrics); Ralph Freed (lyrics) et al. (all uncredited)
- Production company: Metro-Goldwyn-Mayer
- Distributed by: Loew's Inc.
- Release dates: December 31, 1941 (New York City); January 22, 1942 (Los Angeles)
- Running time: 118 minutes
- Country: United States
- Language: English
- Budget: $955,000
- Box office: $3.8 million

Babes on Broadway is a 1941 American musical film starring Mickey Rooney and Judy Garland and directed by Busby Berkeley, with Vincente Minnelli directing Garland's big solo numbers. The film, which features Fay Bainter and Virginia Weidler, was the third in the "Backyard Musical" series about kids who put on their own show, following Babes in Arms (1939) and Strike Up the Band (1940). Songs in the film include "Babes on Broadway" by Burton Lane (music) and E.Y. "Yip" Harburg (lyrics), and "How About You?" by Lane with lyrics by Ralph Freed, the brother of producer Arthur Freed. The movie ends with a minstrel show performed by the main cast in blackface.

== Plot ==
Tommy Williams (Mickey Rooney) is a performer with aspirations of making it on Broadway. He teams up with his friend Penny Morris (Judy Garland) to organize a charity show aimed at benefiting British children affected by World War II. Despite facing numerous obstacles, such as financial difficulties and misunderstandings, their determination and talent push them forward. They gather a diverse group of friends and fellow performers, each bringing their unique skills to the project, to help overcome the challenges they encounter.

As preparations for the show progress, the group faces a series of comedic and dramatic incidents that test their resolve and ingenuity. From securing a venue and costumes to dealing with unexpected mishaps, Tommy and Penny's leadership and creativity keep the project on track. The group’s camaraderie strengthens as they work together, highlighting the power of community and collaboration.

The climax of their efforts is the charity performance, a showcase of musical and theatrical talent that enthralls the audience. The show raises the necessary funds for the cause.

== Cast ==
- Mickey Rooney as Tommy Williams
- Judy Garland as Penny Morris
- Fay Bainter as Miss "Jonesy" Jones
- Virginia Weidler as Barbara Josephine "Jo" Conway
- Ray McDonald as Ray Lambert
- Richard Quine as Morton "Hammy" Hammond
- Donald Meek as Mr. Stone
- Alexander Woollcott as himself
- Luis Alberni as Nick
- James Gleason as Thornton Reed
- Emma Dunn as Mrs. Williams
- Frederick Burton as Mr. Morris
- Cliff Clark as Inspector Moriarity
- William Post Jr. as Announcer
- Donna Reed as Jonesy's Secretary (uncredited)
- Will Lee as Shorty
- Margaret O'Brien as Maxine, a little girl at an audition (uncredited)

== Production ==
Babes on Broadway was the third film in the "Backyard Musical" series, which included Babes in Arms (1939), Strike Up the Band (1940) and Girl Crazy (1943).

Producer Arthur Freed sought to repeat the success of Babes in Arms. Scriptwriter Fred Finklehoffe had also penned Strike Up the Band. Director and choreographer Busby Berkeley shot the musical number "Franklin D. Roosevelt Jones" in a single shot involving 38 separate camera moves.

During production, 19-year-old Garland eloped with her first husband, David Rose, in Las Vegas. Meanwhile, Rooney met Ava Gardner, who would become his first wife.

== Musical numbers ==
- "Babes on Broadway" (Main Title) (MGM Studio Chorus)
- "Anything Can Happen in New York" (Mickey Rooney, Ray McDonald, and Richard Quine)
- "How About You?" (Judy Garland and Mickey Rooney)
- "Hoe Down" (Judy Garland, Mickey Rooney, Six Hits and a Miss, The Five Musical Maids, and MGM Studio Chorus)
- "Chin Up! Cheerio! Carry On!" (Judy Garland, St. Luke's Episcopal Church Choristers, and MGM Studio Chorus)
- Ghost Theater Sequence:
  - "Cyrano de Bergerac" (Mickey Rooney as Richard Mansfield)
  - "Mary's a Grand Old Name" (Judy Garland as Fay Templeton)
  - "She's Ma Daisy" (Mickey Rooney as Harry Lauder)
  - "I've Got Rings On My Fingers" (Judy Garland as Blanche Ring)
  - "La Marseillaise" (Judy Garland as Sarah Bernhardt)
  - "The Yankee Doodle Boy" (Mickey Rooney and Judy Garland)
- "Bombshell from Brazil" (Judy Garland, Mickey Rooney, Richard Quine, Ray McDonald, Virginia Weidler, Anne Rooney, Robert Bradford, and MGM Studio Chorus)
- "Mama Yo Quiero" (Mickey Rooney)
- Minstrel Show Sequence:
  - "Blackout Over Broadway" (Judy Garland, Mickey Rooney, Ray McDonald, Virginia Weidler, Richard Quine, Anne Rooney and MGM Studio Chorus)
  - "By the Light of the Silvery Moon" (Ray McDonald)
  - "Franklin D. Roosevelt Jones" (Judy Garland and MGM Studio Chorus)
  - "Old Folks at Home" (Eddie Peabody on banjo, dubbing for Mickey Rooney)
  - "Alabamy Bound" (Eddie Peabody on banjo, dubbing for Mickey Rooney)
  - "Waiting for the Robert E. Lee" (Judy Garland, Mickey Rooney, Virginia Weidler, Anne Rooney, Richard Quine, and MGM Studio Chorus)
- "Babes on Broadway" (Finale) (Judy Garland, Mickey Rooney, Virginia Weidler, Ray McDonald, Richard Quine, and MGM Studio Chorus)

== Release and reception ==
According to MGM records, the film earned $2,363,000 in the US and Canada and $1,496,000 elsewhere resulting in a profit of $1,720,000.

When Babes on Broadway was released, critics were tiring of the formula and remarked that Garland and Rooney were now young adults who should take on more mature roles.

== Home media ==
Babes on Broadway was released on DVD for the first time as part of a 5-disc DVD set The Mickey Rooney & Judy Garland Collection on September 25, 2007. The set contains Babes on Broadway, Babes in Arms, Girl Crazy, and Strike Up the Band, as well as a fifth disc containing bonus features on Rooney and Garland.
