= Mocambo (nightclub) =

Former nightclub in West Hollywood, California, U.S.

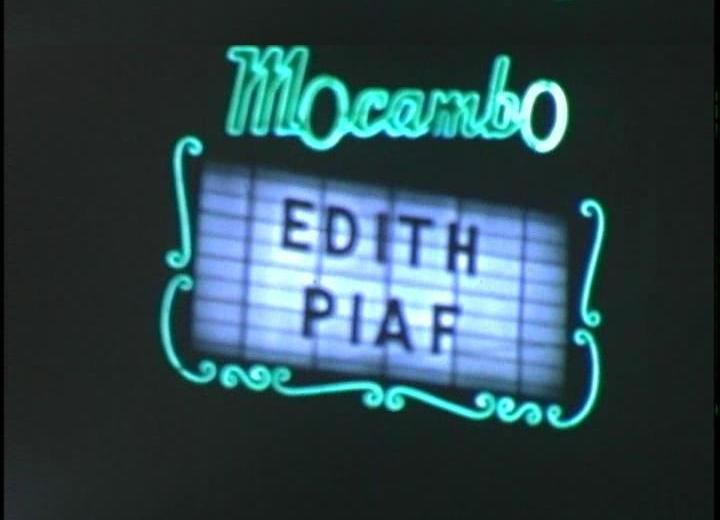
- Mocambo marquee, 1955
- Interactive map of Mocambo
- Location: 8588 Sunset Boulevard; West Hollywood, California; United States
- Coordinates: 34.092693°N 118.378963°W
- Owner: Charlie Morrison; Felix Young
- Type: Nightclub

Construction
- Opened: January 3, 1941
- Closed: June 30, 1958

The Mocambo was a nightclub in West Hollywood, California, at 8588 Sunset Boulevard on the Sunset Strip. It was owned by Charlie Morrison and Felix Young.

== History ==
The Mocambo opened on January 3, 1941, and it became an immediate success. The club's Latin American-themed decor was designed by Tony Duquette and cost $100,000 (equivalent to $2,188,914 in 2025). Along the walls were glass cages holding live cockatoos, macaws, seagulls, pigeons, and parrots. With big band music, the club became one of the most popular dance-till-dawn spots in town. On any given night, one might find the room filled with the leading men and women of the motion picture industry. In 1943, when Frank Sinatra became a solo act, he made his Los Angeles debut at the Mocambo.

On March 15, 1955, Ella Fitzgerald opened at the Mocambo, after Marilyn Monroe lobbied the owner for the booking. The booking was instrumental in Fitzgerald's career. The incident was turned into a play by Bonnie Greer in 2005. It has been widely reported that Fitzgerald was the first Black performer to play the Mocambo, following Monroe's intervention, but this is not true. African-American singers Herb Jeffries, Eartha Kitt, and Joyce Bryant all played the Mocambo in 1953, according to stories published at the time in Jet magazine.

The club's main stage was replicated on the TV series I Love Lucy as the "Tropicana" Club. Lucille Ball and Desi Arnaz were frequent guests at the Mocambo and were close friends of Charlie Morrison.

The Mocambo was also parodied mercilessly in the 1947 Bugs Bunny cartoon, "Slick Hare". According to a commentary track on the DVD with this cartoon, the animators managed to get into the kitchen and drew the kitchen exactly as they saw it, complete with dripping grease on the refrigerator and vegetables lying around the ground.

Early in 1957, club operator and co-owner Charlie Morrison died at his Beverly Hills, California, home. The Mocambo remained in business for one final year, before closing its doors on June 30, 1958. The building was then sold, reopened as a supper club called The Cloister, and eventually demolished.

== Notable performers ==
- Abbott and Costello
- Edie Adams
- Desi Arnaz
- Pearl Bailey
- Jack Benny
- Joyce Bryant
- Marge and Gower Champion
- Jeff Chandler
- Rosemary Clooney
- Nat King Cole
- Perry Como
- Vic Damone
- Dorothy Dandridge
- Billy Daniels
- Sammy Davis Jr.
- Gloria DeHaven
- Billy Eckstine
- Ella Fitzgerald
- Firehouse Five Plus Two
- Paul Gilbert
- Bob Hope
- Lena Horne
- Herb Jeffries
- Allan Jones
- Louis Jordan
- Will Jordan
- Danny Kaye
- Alan King
- Peggy King
- Lisa Kirk
- Eartha Kitt
- Peter Lawford
- Peggy Lee
- Joe E. Lewis
- Liberace
- Gordon MacRae
- Martin and Lewis
- Marilyn Maxwell
- Tim Moore
- Mae Murray
- Mike Nichols and Elaine May
- Amália Rodrigues
- Édith Piaf
- André Previn
- Louis Prima and Keely Smith
- The Ritz Brothers
- Hazel Scott
- Dinah Shore
- Frank Sinatra
- Yma Sumac
- Danny Thomas
- Kay Thompson and The Williams Brothers
- Gene Tierney
- Monique van Vooren
- Dinah Washington
- Joe Williams
- Julie Wilson
- Marie Wilson
- Xavier Cugat
- Ward Kimball with his band, the Firehouse Five Plus Two
