= Melancholy Me =

Single by Ella Fitzgerald
- B-side: "Somebody Bad Stole de Wedding Bell"
- Released: 1954
- Label: Decca
- Songwriters: Joe Thomas; Howard Biggs

Audio
- "Melancholy Me" on YouTube

"Melancholy Me" is a song written by Joe Thomas and Howard Biggs that was a hit in 1954 for Ella Fitzgerald, who recorded it for Decca with the orchestra directed by Sy Oliver.

== Release and critical reception ==
Ella Fitzgerald version
Review scores
Source	Rating
Billboard	79/100

Smith Brothers version
Review scores
Source	Rating
Billboard	positive

In its issues from 6, 13, 20 February, and 6 March 1954, the Billboard magazine listed three single records of the song available for purchase: by Eddy Howard (on Mercury), by Ella Fitzgerald (on Decca) and by the Smith Brothers (on Label X). Eddy Howard 's version was rated "excellent" by Variety, Ella Fitzgerald's version — "excellent" by Variety and 79 ("good") by Billboard.

In its issue from 27 February, Billboard reported: "The Howard recording of this tune has definitely stepped out ahead of the several competing versions on the market. [...] The Ella Fitzgerald and Smith Brothers versions have been reported as good sellers in some territories also, but in almost all considerably behind Howard."

== Chart performance ==
Howard's single charted for several weeks on Billboard's Most Played by Disk Jockeys chart.

== Charts ==
Eddy Howard version

Chart (1954)	Peak position
US Billboard Most Played by Disk Jockeys	16
