= It's Raining, It's Pouring =

Nursery rhyme
- Written: 1909
- Published: 1909
- Recorded: 1939
- Length: Various
- Songwriter: Traditional
- Composer: Traditional (melody from A-Tisket A-Tasket)
- Lyricist: Traditional

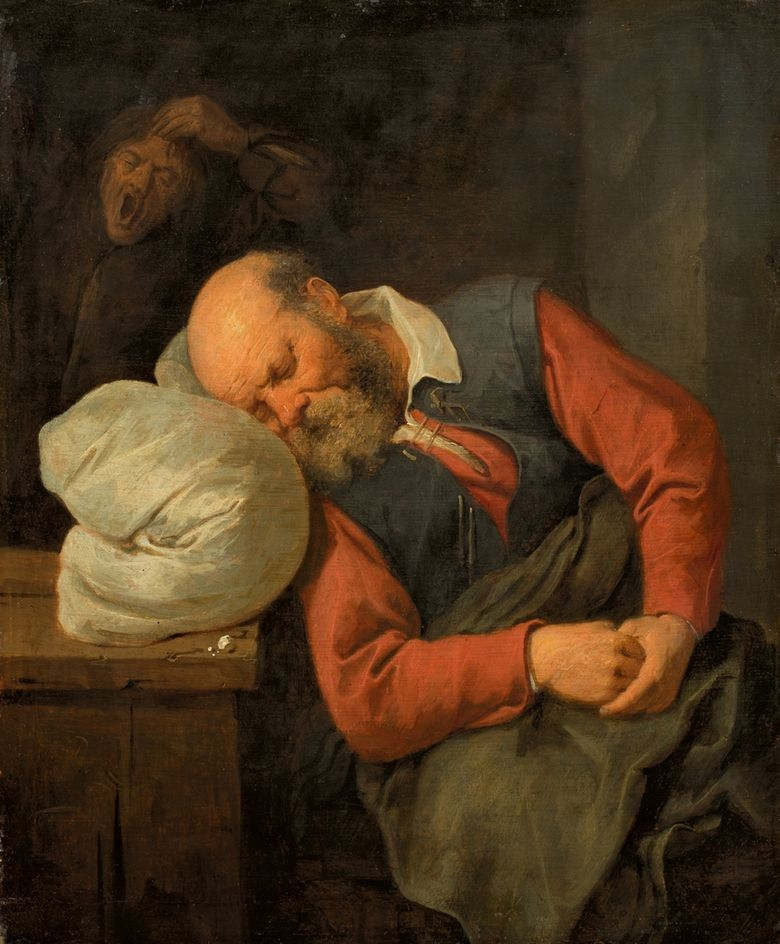
An old man sleeping by David Rijckaert (III), 1640-41

"It's Raining, It's Pouring" is an English language nursery rhyme and children's song, seemingly of American origin but later found in the UK. It has a Roud Folk Song Index number of 16814.

== US versions ==
The first two lines of the rhyme are found near the start of the 1900s. They appear in a 1909 number of the Princeton University magazine The Outlook as "It's raining - it's pouring - old men are snoring". Then in 1912 the rhyme was recorded in the collection The Little Mother Goose in the form of a couplet,

It's raining, it's pouring,
The old man is snoring.

The earliest known audio recording of the song was made in 1939 in New York by anthropologist and folklorist Herbert Halpert and is held in the Library of Congress. A musical version of it was copyrighted in 1944 by Freda Selicoff. The melody is the same as "A Tisket, A Tasket" and has been associated with "What Are Little Boys Made Of?", which has a different melody. By this time two more lines had been added about the old man snoring:

He went to bed and bumped his head,
And couldn't get up in the morning.

A later suggestion has been that that the verse is a "classic description" of a head injury ("bumped his head"), followed by a lucid interval and an inability to resume normal activity ("couldn't get up in the morning"). Andrew Kaye in Essential Neurosurgery suggested that the rhyme is an interpretation of an accidental death.

== UK versions ==
Peter and Iona Opie later recorded instances of the rhyme in the UK. It appears in a notebook from 1952 as occurring in Wales and was later mentioned in their 1959 book, The Lore and Language of Schoolchildren. Another such collection records the rhyme as current in Coventry during the 1970s while an earlier wartime parody beginning "It's raining, it's pouring, and Hitler said to Goering," is mentioned in an entry in the Vaughan Williams Memorial Library.
