= Bonnie Greer =

American-British playwright, novelist and broadcaster (1948–2026)

Bonnie Greer OBE FRSL
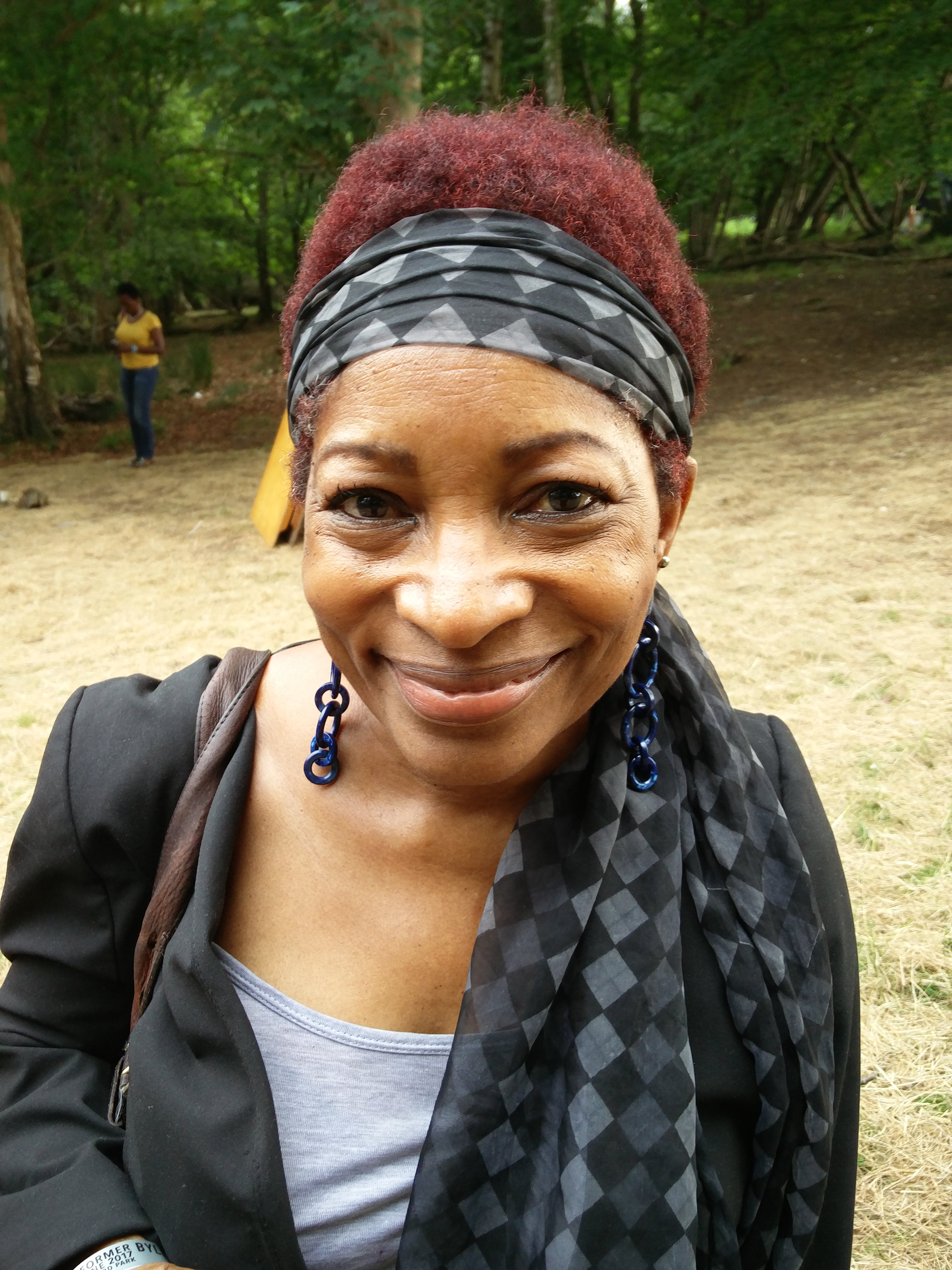
- Greer in 2017
- Born: 16 November 1948; Chicago, Illinois, US
- Died: 15 September 2026 (aged 77)
- Citizenship: United Kingdom; United States
- Education: DePaul University
- Occupations: Playwright, author, critic and broadcaster
- Spouse: David Hutchins (m. 1993)
- Writing career
- Notable awards: Verity Bargate Award (1993)

Bonnie Greer (16 November 1948 – 15 September 2026) was an American and British playwright, novelist, critic and broadcaster, who lived in the UK from 1986 until her death in 2026.

Greer appeared as a panellist on television programmes such as Newsnight Review and Question Time and served on the boards of leading arts organisations, including the British Museum, the Royal Opera House and the London Film School. She was Vice President of the Shaw Society and Chancellor of Kingston University in London. She was appointed OBE in 2010 for her work in the arts, and in 2022 was elected a Fellow of the Royal Society of Literature.

== Early life ==
Bonnie Greer was born on 16 November 1948, in the West Side of Chicago, the eldest of seven children of Ben, a factory worker, and Willie Mae, a homemaker. Greer's father was from a family of Mississippi sharecroppers. He was stationed in Britain during World War II and took part in the D-Day landings. Describing her father as what used to be called a "race man", Greer recalled watching television with him when Malcolm X appeared on the Irv Kupcinet show in about 1963.

In Chicago, she attended Harlan Community Academy High School, after which she enrolled at DePaul University, paying her way by working as a waitress in a blues club.

== Career ==
Although she began writing plays at the age of nine, Greer originally set out on a legal career, but dropped out when her professor told her he did not think women should have a career in law. She instead studied theatre in Chicago under David Mamet's supervision and at the Actors Studio in New York with Elia Kazan. Living in Manhattan's West Village in New York City in the late 1970s and early 1980s, Greer had many gay male friends who contracted HIV/AIDS.

Greer visited Scotland in 1986 as part of a production at the Edinburgh Fringe and was based in Britain from then on. She told The Sunday Times in 2006 that she owed her life to the move. At the time, she decided to migrate to the UK because of her need to "escape the shadow of death" and the declining theatre scene in New York City. She acquired British citizenship in 1997. She worked mainly in theatre with women and ethnic minorities, and was an Arts Council playwright in residence at the Soho Theatre and for Nitro, previously known as the Black Theatre Co-operative and now called NitroBeat. Greer played Joan of Arc at the Theatre Atelier in Paris.

Greer's debut novel, Hanging by Her Teeth, was published in 1994, and the following year she was a contributor to the collection of short stories How Maxine Learned to Love Her Legs and Other Tales of Growing Up, edited by Sarah LeFanu (Aurora Metro Books, 1995). It would be a decade before her second, Entropy, was published, in 2004.

She wrote radio plays for BBC Radio 3 and Radio 4, including a translation of The Little Prince. Her plays included Munda Negra (1993, winner of a Verity Bargate Award for best play by the Soho Theatre), concerning the mental health problems of black women, Dancing on Blackwater (1994) and Jitterbug (2001), and the musicals Solid and Marilyn and Ella. The latter began as a radio play broadcast in December 2005 (Marilyn and Ella Backstage at the Mocambo) after Greer watched a documentary on Marilyn Monroe which mentioned Monroe's assistance to the jazz vocalist Ella Fitzgerald as segregation prevented the singer from working at certain venues, especially the Mocambo nightclub. Adapted for the stage, Greer's radio play was given a production at the Edinburgh Festival Fringe in 2006 and was later rewritten and performed at the Theatre Royal Stratford East in 2008. The play was produced at the Apollo Theatre in London's West End in November 2009.

Greer was a regular contributor to BBC Two's Newsnight Review and was a panellist on the BBC's Question Time. She appeared on the edition in October 2009 that also featured Nick Griffin, then leader of the British National Party, and she notably "challenged racist ideas with composure and historical knowledge." Commenting after the recording she called it "probably the weirdest and most creepy experience of my life". The encounter formed the basis for her opera, Yes, written for the Royal Opera House with music by Errollyn Wallen, and premiered at the Linbury Studio Theatre in November 2011. She was director of the Talawa Theatre Company and served on the boards of the Royal Academy Of Dramatic Art, the Royal Opera House and the London Film School. She was also a theatre critic for Time Out magazine.

Her book Obama Music, partly a musical memoir, was published by Legend Press in October 2009. Reviewing it in The Independent, Lesley McDowell wrote: "Greer expertly weaves in memories of her own upbringing in Chicago, with more humour than you might expect, along with a clear, defined passion for the music she grew up listening to. She wants to show, too, how both the place she lived in, and the songs she listened to, were full of unseen boundaries that had held people back – but also gave them something to fight against." Her biography Langston Hughes: The Value of Contradiction was published in spring 2011. Greer co-produced a documentary film, Reflecting Skin (directed by Mike Dibb), on representations of black people in Western art, which was shown by the BBC in 2004. At the time of her death, she was working on a novel about Rossetti. Greer's memoir A Parallel Life was published in 2014 and was described by Joy Lodico in The Independent as "the story of a journey deliberately and bravely taken against all expectations".

She was a member of the Arts Emergency Service, a British charity working with 16- to 19-year-olds in further education from diverse backgrounds. She was a patron of the London dance and performance centre The Place, as well as of the SI Leeds Literary Prize for unpublished fiction by Black and Asian women in the UK. She was also a board member of the Authors' Licensing and Collecting Society (ALCS).

In April 2005, she was appointed to the British Museum's Board of Trustees and completed two full terms; from late March 2009, she served as Deputy Chairman. Many years later, she would explore her relationship with the British Museum, curating a series of conversations called "The Era of Reclamation", with the support of the Director of the Museum, Hartwig Fischer.

In 2011, she accepted the post of President of the Brontë Society. She resigned in June 2015, following internal disagreements about the society's direction.

She was appointed Chancellor of Kingston University in London in 2013, and also served as Vice-President of the Shaw Society.

In 2016, Greer's play The Hotel Cherise – a modern take on Anton Chekhov's The Cherry Orchard, with the action transposed to a Michigan hotel during the US election – was performed at the Theatre Royal Stratford East in a production by Femi Elufowoju, which elicited the conclusion from critic Michael Billington: "It's a ferociously clever rewrite but I wanted more Greer, less Chekhov."

Greer contributed a piece titled "Till" (referencing Emmett Till) to the 2019 anthology New Daughters of Africa, edited by Margaret Busby.

Greer made appearances in the Sky Arts TV programme Discovering Film as one of its movie experts, and also contributed to Sky Arts programmes on Picasso and Van Gogh. She commented frequently on members of the British Royal Family on various ITN documentaries, including Channel 4's Charles: Our New King.

In 2023, Greer appeared on TalkTV and argued that Manchester United and Manchester City football clubs should remove images of ships from their logos, claiming that they are racist and glorify slavery. When countered with the fact that both clubs had adopted their logos decades after slavery was abolished in the UK, she said that history is changing and that they should investigate with historians.

In 2025, alongside Kate Mosse, Gillian Beer, Scarlett Curtis and Vick Hope, Greer was on the judging panel of the one-off "Women's Prize Outstanding Contribution Award". This honour marked the 30th anniversary of the Women's Prize for Fiction by recognizing a living female novelist's body of work, significant contribution to literature and strong advocacy for women, with Bernardine Evaristo being selected as the recipient.

== Personal life and death ==
According to The Guardian, Greer first encountered her future husband, solicitor David Hutchins, in a supermarket aisle; they married in 1993.

Greer died after a brief illness on 15 September 2026, aged 77. Her death was followed by public tributes from friends that included Clive Myrie.

== Honours and awards ==
The collection of the National Portrait Gallery in London holds a 2002 photographic portrait of Greer by Maud Sulter (1960–2008) that was inspired by Marie-Guillemine Benoist's 1800 painting Portrait d'une Negresse in the Louvre.

In the 2010 Birthday Honours, Greer was appointed Officer of the Order of the British Empire (OBE), for services to the Arts. She received the honour from Prince Charles.

In 2011, Greer was named by The Observer newspaper as one of the UK's top 300 intellectuals, the only woman playwright to feature on the list.

In 2018, she received an honorary doctorate in Drama from the Royal Conservatoire of Scotland.

In 2021, Greer was awarded an honorary doctorate of Literature by the School of Advanced Study of the University of London, "in recognition of her significant contribution to literature, her promotion of intelligent and informed debate and her dedication to the advancement of others." She was a patron of the School's Being Human Festival, a national festival of the humanities.

In July 2022, she was elected a Fellow of the Royal Society of Literature (FRSL) in London.

== Selected works ==
=== Books ===
- Hanging by Her Teeth (Serpent's Tail, 1994), novel. ISBN 978-1-85242-185-4
- Entropy (Picnic Publishing, 2009), novel. ISBN 978-0-9560370-3-9
- Obama Music (Legend Press, 2009). ISBN 978-1-906558-24-6
- Langston Hughes: The Value of Contradiction (2011) (Arcadia/BlackAmber Books). ISBN 978-1-906413-76-7
- A Parallel Life (Arcadia Books, 2014). ISBN 978-1-909807-62-4

=== Films ===
- White Men Are Cracking Up (1996), screenplay)

=== Musicals ===
- Solid
- Marilyn and Ella (2008)

=== Opera ===
- Yes (November 2011), Royal Opera House, Covent Garden

=== Plays ===
- Munda Negra (1993)
- Dancing on Blackwater (1994)
- Jitterbug (Arcola Theatre, 2001)
- The Hotel Cerise (2016)

=== Podcasts ===
- In Search of Black History. Audible Original. 2019. ASIN B08DCLQL3T.

=== Radio plays ===
- The Little Prince
- Marilyn and Ella Backstage at the Mocambo
- Ferguson (2016)

=== Television ===
- Siren Spirits, Episode 4 (1994)
