= Rain Rain Go Away =

English nursery rhyme

"Rain, Rain, Go Away"
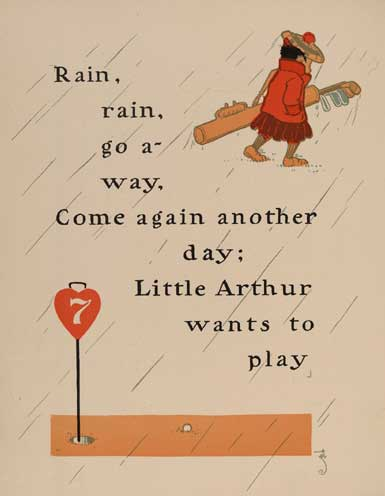
- Illustration from W. W. Denslow's Mother Goose (1901)

Nursery rhyme
- Published: 17th century or earlier

"Rain, Rain, Go Away" is a popular English language nursery rhyme. It has a Roud Folk Song Index number of 19096 and many different variations of it have been recorded.

== Lyrics and melody ==
There are several versions and variations of this rhyming couplet. The most common modern version is generally

Rain, rain, go away,
Come again another day.

but sometimes with different conclusions recorded.

Similar rhymes can be found in many societies, including ancient Greece and ancient Rome. The modern English language rhyme can be dated at least to the 17th century, when James Howell in his 1659 collection of proverbs noted "Raine, raine, goe to Spain: faire weather come againe". At the same period John Aubrey noted that "little children have a custom when it raines to sing or charme away the Raine; thus they all joine in a chorus and sing Raine, raine, goe away, Come againe a Saterday", while a book of prognostications for 1829 provides "come again tomorrow day".

A wide variety of other alternatives has been recorded for when the rain may return, including: "Midsummer day", "washing day", "Christmas Day" and "on Martha's wedding day", while in the mid-19th century James Orchard Halliwell collected the version:

Rain, rain, go away
Come again another day;
Little Arthur wants to play.

At much the same time, a parallel charm against the rain was noted as

Rain on the green grass, rain on the tree,
And rain on the house-top but not upon me.

Still other regional variations were collected during the 19th century and later. In Scotland the rain was bidden "Rain, rain, gang to Spain, And never come back again", while elsewhere various bribes were offered to make it go away. In Northumberland, for example, "When I brew, and when I bake, I'll gie you a little cake"; in Cornwall this was further specified as "You shall have a figgy cake, And a glass of brandy". In Yorkshire, after it has been told to go away, it is further exhorted, "Rain, rain, come down and pour, Then you'll only last an hour"; in Norfolk this changes to "Go to France and go to Spain, And mind you don’t come back again".

The song is also known in the U. S. where, in North and South Carolina, the rain is informed that

Little Johnny wants to play,
In the meadow on the hay.
