= A-Tisket, A-Tasket =

1938 song by Al Feldman and Ella Fitzgerald

"A-Tisket, A-Tasket" (Roud Folk Song Index 13188) is a nursery rhyme first recorded in North America in the late 19th century. The melody to which the nursery rhyme is sung recurs in other nursery rhymes including "It's Raining, It's Pouring"; "Rain, Rain, Go Away" and "Ring Around the Rosie". It was further used as the basis for a successful 1938 recording by Ella Fitzgerald, composed by Fitzgerald in conjunction with Al Feldman (later known as Van Alexander).

== Traditional lyrics ==
The rhyme was first noted in the United States in 1879 as a children's rhyming game. It was sung while children danced in a circle. One of them would run on the outside of the circle and drop a handkerchief. The nearest child then had to pick it up and chase the dropper. If caught, the dropper would join the circle. An early noted version had the lyrics:

A-tisket a-tasket
A green and yellow basket
I wrote a letter to my friend
And on the way I dropped it,
I dropped it, I dropped it,
And on the way I dropped it.
A little boy he picked it up
And put it in his pocket.

In some variants, the second line is "I lost my yellow basket". In other variants, the last line is "A little girl she picked it up and put it in her pocket".

In 19th century England, the rhyme used in the same game had somewhat different but evidently related words:

I lost my supper, last night,
And the night before,
And if I do this night,
I never will no more.
I sent a letter to my love,
I carried water in my glove,
And by the way I dropped it, I did so, I did so:
I had a little dog that said bow-wow!
I had a little cat that said meow-meow!
Shan't bite you, shan't bite you,
Shall bite you.
I dropt it, I dropt it,
And by the way I lost it.

== Lyrics by Ella Fitzgerald ==
"A-Tisket, A-Tasket"

Single by Chick Webb Orchestra, vocal Ella Fitzgerald
- B-side: Liza (All the Clouds 'll Roll Away)
- Released: June 1938
- Recorded: May 2, 1938
- Genre: Jazz standard
- Length: 2:34
- Label: Decca 1840
- Songwriters: Al Feldman, Ella Fitzgerald

Ella Fitzgerald and Al Feldman (later known as Van Alexander), extended and embellished the rhyme into a jazz piece that was her breakthrough hit with the Chick Webb Orchestra in 1938. It has since become a jazz standard. The lyrics changed the color of the basket to brown and yellow. In Fitzgerald's version a little girl picks up the note and then takes the basket after it is carelessly left on the ground. A follow-up song written by Fitzgerald and Webb entitled "I Found My Yellow Basket" (1938) later reached at #3 on the U.S. Charts.

== In popular culture ==
=== As a recording ===
The song was a major hit of the "pre-chart" era, reaching number one on Billboard's Sheet Music and Record Buying Guide (jukebox) charts and number one on Your Hit Parade.

The Platters recorded a version of the song called "A Tisket A Tasket" in 1959.

The song, titled "Green and Yellow Basket," was included on the actress-singer Hayley Mills' 1961 album Let's Get Together with Hayley Mills, with extra verses describing how the dropper felt about losing the letter.

Bing Crosby included the song in a medley on his album On the Happy Side (1962).

Lines from the song have been mentioned by Stevie Ray Vaughan, Prince, Half Man Half Biscuit, Ganksta N-I-P, The Shangri-Las, Scarface, Coolio, Richie Rich, Eminem, Madonna and Boondox.

Nabisco did a "take-off" of the song for its advertising campaign in the 1970s, with the lyrics "A Triscuit, A Triscuit, baked only by Nabisco".

=== In movies ===
The song was used in the opening of the movie The Cowboy and the Lady (1938), but was not credited. Parts of it were played by an orchestra, used as background music, and sung by Harry Davenport.

Curly Howard recites a paraphrase of the (non-musical) rhyme in the Three Stooges short We Want Our Mummy (1939).

The music for the song was used in the opening scene of John Ford's 1940 film The Grapes of Wrath to help establish the contemporary time frame of the events of the film.

Fitzgerald performed the song in the Abbott and Costello film Ride 'Em Cowboy (1942).

A rendition of the song was also performed in the Paul Thomas Anderson movie The Master (2012).

=== In video games ===
The song "A-Tisket, A-Tasket" was used as the song for Playtime in the 2018 horror game Baldi's Basics. It plays on a loop everytime when the aforementioned character is near the player.

== Literary references ==
The Fitzgerald song and its follow up (in which the Yellow Basket is found) feature centrally in Ali Smith's 2008 short story, The Second Person.
