= Joyce Bryant =

American singer and actress (1927–2022)

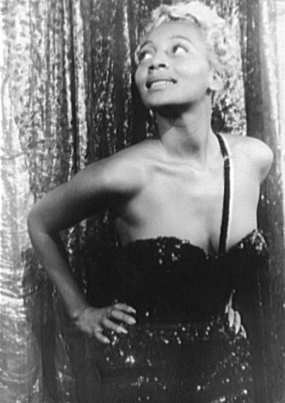
- Bryant in 1953

Background information
- Born: Ione Emily Bryant; October 14, 1927; Oakland, California, U.S.
- Died: November 20, 2022 (aged 95) Los Angeles, California
- Genres: Traditional pop; vocal jazz; gospel; opera
- Occupations: Singer, actress, recording artist, dancer, civil rights activist
- Instrument: Vocals
- Years active: 1946–1955; 1960s–2000s
- Labels: Okeh; Epic

Joyce Bryant (October 14, 1927 – November 20, 2022) was an American singer, dancer, and civil rights activist who achieved fame in the late 1940s and early 1950s as a theater and nightclub performer. With her signature silver hair and tight mermaid dresses, she became an early African-American sex symbol, garnering such nicknames as "The Bronze Blond Bombshell", "The Black Marilyn Monroe", "The Belter", and "The Voice You'll Always Remember".

Bryant left the industry in 1955 at the height of her popularity to devote herself to the Seventh-day Adventist Church. A decade later, she returned to show business as a trained classical vocalist and later became a vocal coach.

== Early life ==
Joyce Bryant, the third of eight children, was born in Oakland, California, and raised in San Francisco. Her father, Whitfield W. Bryant (1904–1993), worked as a chef for the Southern Pacific Railroad. Her mother, Dorthy Constance Withers (maiden; 1907–1995), was a devout Seventh-day Adventist. Her maternal grandfather, Frank Withers (né Frank Douglas Withers; 1880–1952), was an early jazz trombonist. Bryant, a quiet child raised in a strict home, had ambitions of becoming a sociology teacher.

Bryant eloped at the age of 14 but the marriage ended that same evening. In 1946, while visiting cousins in Los Angeles, she agreed on a dare to participate in an impromptu singalong at a local club. "After a while," Bryant recounted in a 1955 Jet interview, "I found I was the only one singing. A few minutes later the club owner offered me $25 to go up on stage, and I took it because I [needed the money] to get home."

== Career ==
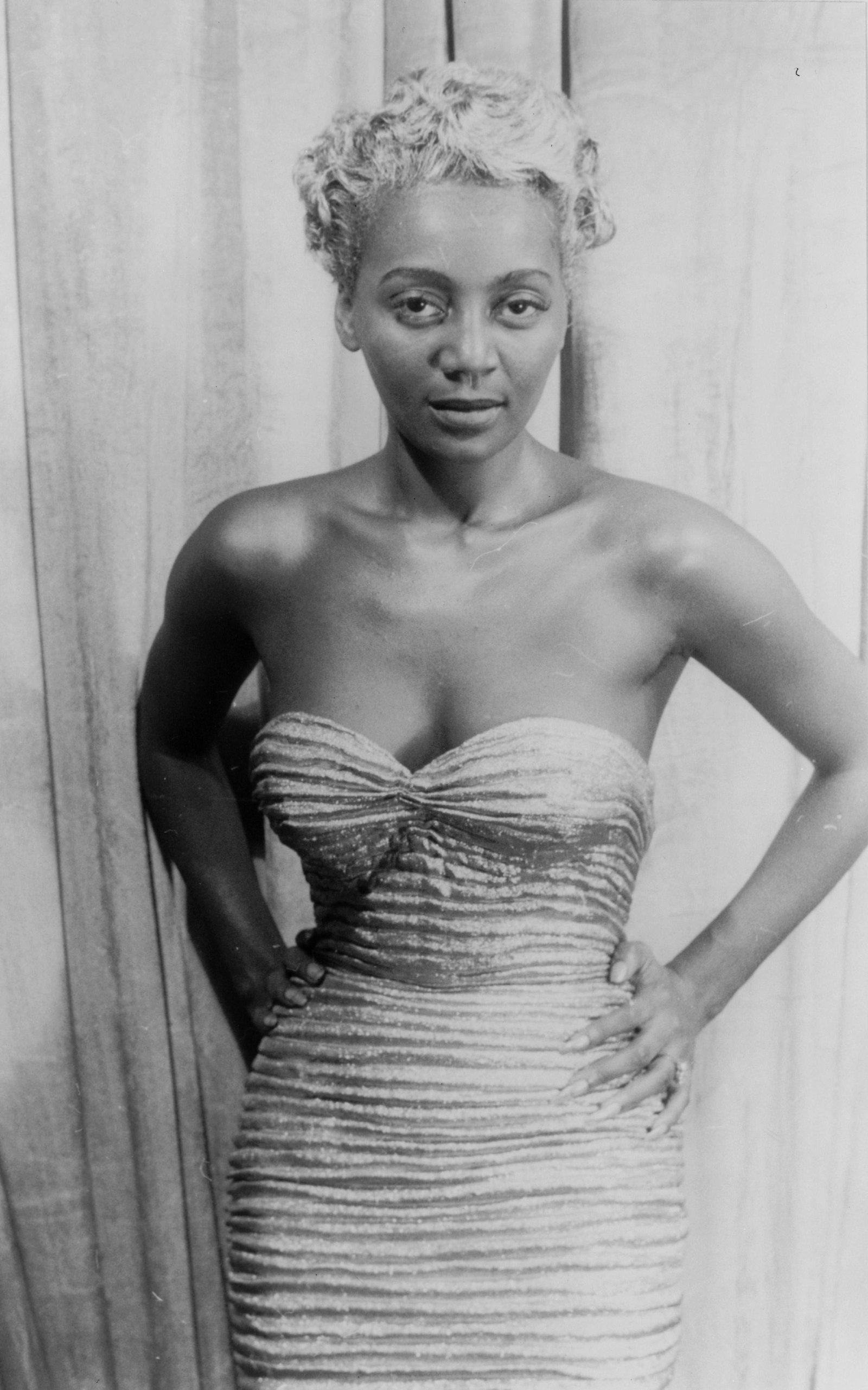
Joyce Bryant, c. 1953

During the late 1940s, Bryant had slowly acquired a series of regular gigs, from a $400-per-week engagement at New York City's La Martinique nightclub to a 118-show tour of the Catskill Mountains hotel circuit. Her reputation and profile eventually grew to the level that one night, she appeared on the same bill as Josephine Baker. Not wanting to be upstaged, Bryant colored her hair silver using radiator paint, and performed wearing a tight silver dress and silver floor-length mink. Bryant recalled when she arrived onstage, "I stopped everything!" Bryant's silver hair and tight, backless, cleavage-revealing mermaid dresses became her trademark look and, combined with her four octave voice, further elevated her status into one of the major headlining stars of the early 1950s, by which time she became known by such nicknames as "The Bronze Blond Bombshell", "the black Marilyn Monroe", "The Belter", and "The Voice You'll Always Remember". Etta James noted in her 2003 autobiography, Rage to Survive: The Etta James Story: "I didn't want to look innocent. I wanted to look like Joyce Bryant. [...] I dug her. I thought Joyce was gutsy and I copied her style–brazen and independent."

Beginning in 1952, Bryant released a series of records for Okeh, including "A Shoulder to Weep On", "After You've Gone", and "Farewell to Love". Two of her most well-known standards, "Love for Sale" and "Drunk with Love", were banned from radio play for their provocative lyrics. Upon the release of "Runnin' Wild" two years later, Jet noted that the song was Bryant's "first to be passed by CBS and NBC radio censors, who banned three previous recordings for being too sexy." Bryant remarked in 1980, "what an irony that my biggest hit record was 'Love for Sale'. Banned in Boston it was, and later...just about everywhere else."

Bryant, who often faced discrimination and was outspoken on issues of racial inequality, became in 1952 the first black entertainer to perform at a Miami Beach hotel, defying threats by the Ku Klux Klan who had burned her in effigy.

Bryant was critical of racial billing practices at night clubs and hotels and advocated for entertainers as a group to fight Jim Crow laws.

In 1954, she became one of the first black singers to perform at the Casino Royal in Washington, D.C., where she said that she had heard so much about the segregation practiced there that she was surprised to see so many African-Americans attend the downtown club. "It was a great thrill," she said, "to see them enter and be treated so courteously by the management."

A Life magazine layout in 1953 depicted Bryant in provocative poses, which film historian and author Donald Bogle said were "the kind that readers seldom saw of white goddesses." The following year, Bryant – along with Lena Horne, Hilda Simms, Eartha Kitt, and Dorothy Dandridge – was named in an issue of Ebony one of the five most beautiful black women in the world.

== Departure and return to show business ==
Bryant earned up to $3500 a performance in the early 1950s, but she had grown weary of the industry. The silver paint had damaged her hair, she did not enjoy working on the Sabbath, and she felt uneasy with her image. "Religion has always been a part of me," she said. "and it was a very sinful thing I was doing – being very sexy, with tight, low cut gowns." She also recalled: "I had a very bad throat and I was doing eight performances a day [...] A doctor was brought in to help and he said, 'I can spray your throat with cocaine and that will fix the problem, but you'll become addicted.' Then I overheard my manager say, 'I don't care what you do, just make her sing!'" Further, Bryant hated the men, often gangsters, who frequented the clubs in which she worked. She was once beaten in her dressing room after rejecting a man's advances. Her disenchantment with the drug and gangster subcultures, combined with pressures from her management, led Bryant to quit performing late in 1955.

Devoting herself to the Seventh-day Adventist Church, Bryant enrolled in Oakwood College in Huntsville, Alabama. Ebony published a feature article in its May 1956 issue entitled "The New World of Joyce Bryant: Former Café Singer Gives Up $200,000-a-year Career to Learn to Serve God". Traveling for years through the South, Bryant grew angry when she saw hospitals refuse care for those in critical need because they were black. As a result, she organized fundraisers for blacks to buy food, clothing, and medicine, and she continued to put on concerts – wearing her natural black hair and no makeup – to raise money for her church.

Bryant met frequently with Martin Luther King Jr. – a fan of her singing – to support his efforts to bring basic material comforts to blacks. Bryant believed the struggle for civil rights to be the struggle for all people who believed in God, but when she confronted her church, asking it to take a stand against discrimination, the church refused with the reasoning, "But these are of earthly matters and thus of no spiritual importance."

Disillusioned, Bryant returned to entertaining in the 1960s and trained with vocal teacher Frederick Wilkerson at Howard University, which led to her winning a contract with the New York City Opera. She also toured internationally with the Italian, French, and Vienna Opera companies. She returned to performing jazz in the 1980s and began a career as a vocal instructor, with such clients as Jennifer Holliday, Phyllis Hyman, and Raquel Welch. A documentary, entitled Joyce Bryant: The Lost Diva, is in the works.

== Personal life and death ==
Bryant died of complications from Alzheimer's disease in Los Angeles on November 20, 2022, at the age of 95.
