= Ella Fitzgerald albums discography =

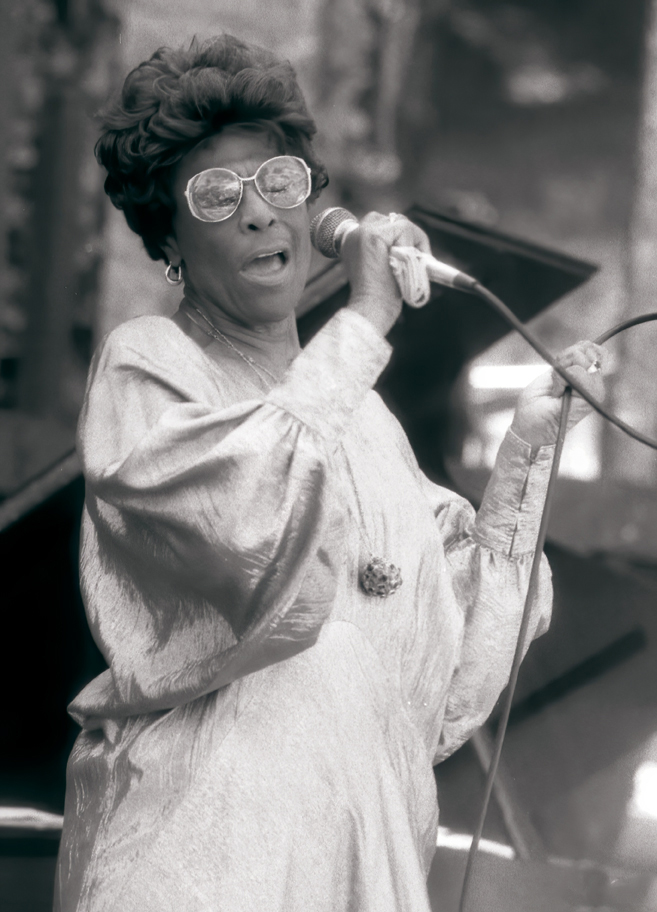
Fitzgerald in 1986

With the introduction of 10" and 12" Long-Playing records in the late 1940s, Decca released several original albums of Ella Fitzgerald's music and reissued many of her previous releases. From 1935 to the late 1940s Decca issued Ella Fitzgerald's recordings on 78 rpm singles and album collections, in book form, of four singles that included eight tracks. These recordings have been re-issued on a series of 15 compact discs by the French record label Classics Records between 1992 and 2008.

Ella Fitzgerald signed with the Norman Granz label Verve Records in 1956, and recorded with Verve until the mid-1960s. This era featured a series of eight Song Book albums, with interpretations of much of the Great American Songbook, based on tunes from Cole Porter (1956), Rodgers & Hart (1956), Duke Ellington (1957), Irving Berlin (1958), George and Ira Gershwin (1959), Harold Arlen (1961), Jerome Kern (1963), and Johnny Mercer (1964). The many standalone singles Fitzgerald released throughout her Verve years were re-issued on Jukebox Ella: The Complete Verve Singles, Vol. 1 (2003) and Jukebox Ella: The Complete Verve Singles, Vol. 2 (2025).

The late 1960s and early 1970s saw Fitzgerald release albums on several major record labels, including three albums on Capitol Records and two on the Reprise Records label. In 1972 Norman Granz formed Pablo Records, the label continued to release Ella Fitzgerald's albums up until her last recorded album All That Jazz in 1990.

The Ella Fitzgerald catalogue has continued to grow in recent years, with complete albums of previously unreleased live material and alternative recordings from her studio sessions.

== Studio albums ==
=== 1950s ===
List of studio albums, with selected chart positions, and other relevant details
Title	Album details	Peak chart positions		
Title	Album details	US	US Jazz	UK
Souvenir Album	Released: 1947; Recorded: February 15, 1940–July 31, 1941; Label: Decca; Formats: 4 x 78 RPM, LP	—	—	—
Ella Sings Gershwin	Released: 1950; Recorded: September 11–12, 1950; Label: Decca; Formats: 4 x 78 RPM, LP	—	—	13
Songs in a Mellow Mood	Released: 1954; Recorded: March 29–30, 1954; Label: Decca; Formats: LP	—	—	—
Lullabies of Birdland	Released: 1955; Recorded: October 4, 1945–May 3, 1955; Label: Decca; Formats: LP	—	—	—
Sweet and Hot	Released: 1955; Recorded: June 26, 1952–April 27, 1955; Label: Decca; Formats: LP	—	—	—
Ella Fitzgerald Sings the Cole Porter Song Book	Released: May 15, 1956; Label: Verve; Formats: LP	15	—	—
Ella and Louis (with Louis Armstrong)	Released: October 1956; Label: Verve; Formats: LP	12	3	—
Ella Fitzgerald Sings the Rodgers & Hart Song Book	Released: 1956; Label: Verve; Formats: LP	11	—	—
Ella And Her Fellas	Released: 1957; Recorded: May 2, 1938–November 23, 1951; Label: Decca; Formats: LP	—	—	—
Ella and Louis Again (with Louis Armstrong)	Released: October 1957; Label: Verve; Formats: LP	—	12	—
Ella Fitzgerald Sings the Duke Ellington Song Book (with Duke Ellington)	Released: 1957; Label: Verve; Formats: LP	—	—	—
Like Someone in Love	Released: 1957; Label: Verve; Formats: LP	—	—	—
Porgy and Bess	Released: 1957; Label: Verve; Formats: LP	—	—	—
Miss Ella Fitzgerald & Mr Gordon Jenkins	Released: 1958; Recorded: April 27, 1949–March 24, 1954; Label: Decca; Formats: LP	—	—	—
The First Lady Of Song	Released: 1958; Recorded: March 19, 1947–August 1, 1955; Label: Decca; Formats: LP	—	—	—
Ella Swings Lightly	Released: 1958; Label: Verve; Formats: LP	—	—	—
Ella Fitzgerald Sings the Irving Berlin Song Book	Released: 1958; Label: Verve; Formats: LP	—	—	5
For Sentimental Reasons	Released: 1959; Recorded: November 6, 1944–September 19, 1952; Label: Decca; Formats: LP	—	—	—
Hello, Love	Released: 1959; Label: Verve; Formats: LP, CD, Reel-to-Reel	—	—	—
Get Happy!	Released: 1959; Label: Verve; Formats: LP, CD, Reel-to-Reel	—	—	—
Ella Fitzgerald Sings Sweet Songs for Swingers	Released: 1959; Label: Verve; Formats: LP, CD, Reel-to-Reel	—	—	—
Ella Fitzgerald Sings the George and Ira Gershwin Song Book	Released: 1959; Label: Verve; Formats: LP, CD	—	—	—
"—" denotes a single that did not chart or was not released.

=== 1960s ===
List of studio albums, with selected chart positions, and other relevant details
Title	Album details	Peak chart positions						
Title	Album details	US	US Jazz	BEL	NLD	NOR	SWE	UK
Ella Wishes You a Swinging Christmas	Released: 1960; Label: Verve; Formats: LP	45	5	55	37	33	33	44
Ella Fitzgerald Sings Songs from the Soundtrack of "Let No Man Write My Epitaph"	Released: 1960; Label: Verve; Formats: LP	—	—	—	—	—	—	—
Ella Fitzgerald Sings the Harold Arlen Song Book	Released: 1961; Label: Verve; Formats: LP	—	—	—	—	—	—	—
Clap Hands, Here Comes Charlie!	Released: 1961; Label: Verve; Formats: LP	—	—	—	—	—	—	—
Rhythm Is My Business	Released: 1962; Label: Verve; Formats: LP	—	—	—	—	—	—	—
Ella Swings Brightly with Nelson	Released: 1962; Label: Verve; Formats: LP	—	—	—	—	—	—	—
Ella Swings Gently with Nelson	Released: 1962; Label: Verve; Formats: LP	—	—	—	—	—	—	—
Ella Sings Broadway	Released: 1963; Label: Verve; Formats: LP	—	—	—	—	—	—	—
Ella Fitzgerald Sings the Jerome Kern Song Book	Released: 1963; Label: Verve; Formats: LP	—	—	—	—	—	—	—
Ella and Basie! (with Count Basie)	Released: 1963; Label: Verve; Formats: LP	69	—	—	—	—	—	—
These Are the Blues	Released: 1963; Label: Verve; Formats: LP	—	—	—	—	—	—	—
Hello, Dolly!	Released: July 1964; Label: Verve; Formats: LP	146	—	—	—	—	—	—
Ella Fitzgerald Sings the Johnny Mercer Song Book	Released: 1964; Label: Verve; Formats: LP	—	—	—	—	—	—	—
Ella at Duke's Place (with Duke Ellington)	Released: 1965; Label: Verve; Formats: LP	—	—	—	—	—	—	—
Whisper Not	Released: 1966; Label: Verve; Formats: LP	—	—	—	—	—	—	—
Brighten the Corner	Released: August 1967; Label: Capitol; Formats: LP	172	—	—	—	—	—	—
Ella Fitzgerald's Christmas	Released: November 1967; Label: Capitol; Formats: LP	—	—	—	—	—	—	—
30 by Ella	Released: 1968; Label: Capitol; Formats: LP	—	—	—	—	—	—	—
Misty Blue	Released: 1968; Label: Capitol; Formats: LP	—	—	—	—	—	—	—
Ella	Released: 1969; Label: Reprise; Formats: LP	196	—	—	—	—	—	—
"—" denotes a single that did not chart or was not released.

=== 1970s ===
List of studio albums, showing all relevant details
Title	Album details
Things Ain't What They Used to Be (And You Better Believe It)	Released: 1970; Label: Reprise; Formats: LP
Ella Loves Cole	Released: 1972; Label: Atlantic; Formats: LP
Take Love Easy (with Joe Pass)	Released: 1973; Label: Pablo; Formats: LP, cassette
Ella and Oscar (with Oscar Peterson)	Released: 1975; Label: Pablo; Formats: LP, cassette
Fitzgerald and Pass... Again (with Joe Pass)	Released: 1976; Label: Pablo; Formats: LP, cassette
Lady Time	Released: 1978; Label: Pablo; Formats: LP, cassette
Fine and Mellow	Released: 1979; Label: Pablo; Formats: LP, cassette
A Classy Pair (with Count Basie)	Released: 1979; Label: Pablo; Formats: LP, cassette

=== 1980s ===
List of studio albums, showing all relevant details
Title	Album details
Ella Abraça Jobim	Released: 1981; Label: Pablo; Formats: LP, cassette
The Best Is Yet to Come	Released: 1982; Label: Pablo; Formats: LP, cassette
Speak Love (with Joe Pass)	Released: 1983; Label: Pablo; Formats: LP
Nice Work If You Can Get It (with André Previn	Released: 1983; Label: Pablo; Formats: LP, cassette
Easy Living (with Joe Pass)	Released: 1986; Label: Pablo; Formats: LP, CD, cassette
All That Jazz	Released: 1990; Label: Pablo; Formats: LP, CD, cassette

== Live albums ==
The albums are sorted by release date.

Title	Album details	Notes
Jazz at the Hollywood Bowl	Released: 1957; Label: Verve	
Ella Fitzgerald And Billie Holiday At Newport	Released: 1958; Label: Verve	
Ella At The Opera House	Released: 1958; Label: Verve	
Ella In Berlin: Mack The Knife	Released: 1960; Label: Verve	Later re-issued as The Complete Ella In Berlin: Mack The Knife with additional tracks.
Ella In Hollywood	Released: 1961; Label: Verve	
Ella At Juan-Les-Pins	Released: 1964; Label: Verve	
Ella In Hamburg	Released: 1965; Label: Verve	
Duke & Ella In Concerto (with Duke Ellington)	Released: 1966; Label: Verve	
Ella And Duke At The Cote D'Azur (with Duke Ellington)	Released: 1966; Label: Verve	
Sunshine Of Your Love	Released: 1968; Label: MPS	
J.A.T.P. In Tokyo: Live At The Nichigeki Theatre 1953	Recorded: 1953; Released: 1972; Label: Verve	
Jazz At Santa Monica Civic '72	Recorded: 1972; Released: 1972; Label: Pablo	
Newport Jazz Festival: Live At Carnegie Hall, July 5, 1973	Released: 1973; Label: Columbia	
Ella In London	Recorded: 1974; Released: 1974; Label: Pablo	
Ella Fitzgerald And Her Orchestra Live From The Roseland Ballroom, 1940	Released: 1974; Label: Sunbeam	
Ella Fitzgerald At The Montreux Jazz Festival 1975	Released: 1975; Label: Pablo	
Montreux '77 (with the Tommy Flanagan Trio)	Recorded: 1977; Released: 1977; Label: Pablo	
Digital III At Montreux	Released: 1979; Label: Pablo	
A Perfect Match (with Count Basie)	Released: 1979; Label: Pablo	
Ella À Nice	Released: 1982; Label: Pablo	
Return To Happiness: Jazz At The Philharmonic, Yoyogi National Stadium, Tokyo, 1983	Recorded: 1983; Released: 1983; Label: Pablo	
The Stockholm Concert, 1966 (with Duke Ellington)	Released: 1984; Label: Pablo	
Ella In Rome: The Birthday Concert	Recorded: 1958; Released: 1988; Label: Verve	
The Greatest Jazz Concert In The World (with Duke Ellington)	Released: 1990; Label: Pablo	
Ella Returns To Berlin	Released: 1991; Label: Verve	
The Complete Ella In Berlin: Mack The Knife	Released: 1993; Label: Verve	Re-issue of the album Ella In Berlin: Mack The Knife with additional tracks.
Ella Fitzgerald With The Tommy Flanagan Trio	Released: 1996; Label: LaserLight	
Live From The Cave Supper Club: Vancouver BC, Canada, 19 May 1968	Recorded: 1968; Released: 1999; Label: Jazz Band Records	
Ella Fitzgerald In Budapest	Released: 1999; Label: Pablo	
Sophisticated Lady (with Joe Pass)	Released: 2001; Label: Pablo	
Live At Mister Kelly's	Released: 2007; Label: Verve	
Twelve Nights In Hollywood	Released: 2009; Label: Verve	
Ella In Japan: 'S Wonderful	Released: 2011; Label: Verve	
Live in Paris, Vol. 1 (May 8 – October 7, 1957)	Released: 2012; Label: Fremeaux	Previously unreleased live recordings, released over 3 volumes, from a series of concerts recorded between 1957 and 1962 at the Paris Olympia.
Live in Paris, Vol. 2 (May 1, 1958; February 23 & 29, 1960)	Released: 2012; Label: Fremeaux	
Live in Paris, Vol. 3 (February 28 & March 11, 1961; March 16, 1962)	Released: 2013; Label: Fremeaux	
Ella At Zardi's	Released: 2017; Label: Verve	Previously unreleased live concert recording from Zardi's Jazzland on Hollywood Boulevard, L.A., February 2, 1956.
Ella: The Lost Berlin Tapes	Released: 2020; Label: Verve	Previously unreleased live concert recording from Berlin, Germany, 1962.
In Concert - Falkoner Centret Copenhagen, Denmark May 21, 1959 (with the Roy Eldridge Quintet)	Released: October 15, 2022; Label: SteepleChase (SCCD 36503); Format: CD	Previously unreleased archival live concert recording from Copenhagen, Denmark. The physical sleeve lists May 21, 1959, but the concert occurred on April 21, 1959.
Live in East Berlin 1967	Released: 2023; Label: The Lost Recordings	Previously unreleased live concert recording from Friedrichstadt-Palast, 1967

== Notable guest appearances ==
The albums are sorted by release date.

- 1949 – Sing The Song Hits From "South Pacific"
- 1955 – Songs from Pete Kelly's Blues
- 1956 – Metronome All-Stars 1956
- 1957 – One O'Clock Jump
- 1958 – Billie, Ella, Lena, Sarah!
- 1960 – The Drum Battle: Gene Krupa and Buddy Rich at J.A.T.P.
- 1989 – Back on the Block
- 1992 – The Setting Sun: Music From The Original Motion Picture Soundtrack (Compact Disc RCA VICTOR VICP 8084, Japan. Ella Fitzgerald sings "The Setting Sun". It was her last professional recording, recorded at Warner Bros. Studios in January 1992 with arrangements by Billy May.
- 2002 – Classic Duets (Three duets with Frank Sinatra, originally recorded in 1957 on the ABC TV series The Frank Sinatra Show)

== Boxed sets and compilations ==
- 1994 – The Complete Ella Fitzgerald Song Books
- 1995 – Ella: The Legendary Decca Recordings
- 1997 – The Complete Ella Fitzgerald & Louis Armstrong on Verve
- 1998 – Swingsation: Ella Fitzgerald with Chick Webb
- 2013 – The Complete Chick Webb and Ella Fitzgerald Decca Sessions 1934-1941
- 2017 – Ella 100: 100 Songs for a Centennial
