= For Sentimental Reasons =

For Sentimental Reasons may refer to:

- For Sentimental Reasons (Nat King Cole album), 1997
- For Sentimental Reasons (Ella Fitzgerald album), 1955
- For Sentimental Reasons (Linda Ronstadt album), 1986
- For Sentimental Reasons, a 2007 album by Bobby Hutcherson
- "For Sentimental Reasons" (1936 song), a song popularized in the 1930s by Tommy Dorsey
- "(I Love You) For Sentimental Reasons", a song written by William "Pat" Best
