= Ella in Hamburg =

Live album by Ella Fitzgerald
- Released: 1965
- Recorded: March 26, 1965
- Genre: Jazz
- Length: 46:48
- Label: Verve
- Producer: Norman Granz

Ella Fitzgerald chronology
Ella at Juan-Les-Pins (1964)	Ella in Hamburg (1965)	Ella at Duke's Place (1965)

Professional ratings
Review scores
Source	Rating
AllMusic	2.5/5 stars

Ella in Hamburg is a 1965 live album by the American jazz singer Ella Fitzgerald, recorded in Hamburg, Germany.

Ella is accompanied by a trio led by the pianist Tommy Flanagan. This was Ella's last live solo album to be released on the Verve label, and provides a perfect snapshot of her concert repertoire and voice at this stage of her career.

On September 18, 2007, the album was released on CD worldwide, on the Verve "Originals" reissues.

== Track listing ==
For the 1965 Verve LP release; Verve V6-4069; Re-issued in 2007 on CD, Verve 06025 173 522-2

Side One:

1. "Walk Right In" (Gus Cannon, Hosea Woods) – 3:43
2. "That Old Black Magic" (Harold Arlen, Johnny Mercer) – 4:20
3. "Body and Soul" (Frank Eyton, Johnny Green, Edward Heyman, Robert Sour) – 4:46
4. "Here's That Rainy Day" (Sonny Burke, Jimmy Van Heusen) – 3:41
5. "And the Angels Sing" (Ziggy Elman, Mercer) – 4:00
6. "A Hard Day's Night" (John Lennon, Paul McCartney) – 3:21

Side Two:

1. Ellington Medley: "Do Nothin' Till You Hear from Me"/"Mood Indigo"/"It Don't Mean A Thing (If It Ain't Got That Swing)" (Barney Bigard, Duke Ellington, Irving Mills, Bob Russell) – 6:38
2. "The Boy from Ipanema" (Antônio Carlos Jobim, Norman Gimbel, Vinícius de Moraes) – 3:04
3. "Don't Rain on My Parade" (Bob Merrill, Jule Styne) – 3:19
4. "Angel Eyes" (Earl Brent, Matt Dennis) – 3:39
5. "Smooth Sailing" (Arnett Cobb) – 4:07
6. "Old MacDonald Had a Farm" (Traditional) – 3:51

== Personnel ==
Recorded March 26, 1965, in Hamburg, Germany:

- Ella Fitzgerald – vocals
- Tommy Flanagan Trio:
- Tommy Flanagan – piano
- Keter Betts – bass
- Gus Johnson – drums
