= Dream Dancing (Ella Fitzgerald album) =

Studio album by Ella Fitzgerald
- Released: 1978
- Recorded: June 1972 and February 1978
- Genre: Jazz
- Length: 72:20
- Label: Pablo
- Producer: Norman Granz

Ella Fitzgerald chronology
Lady Time (1977)	Dream Dancing (1978)	Fine and Mellow (1979)

Professional ratings
Review scores
Source	Rating
AllMusic	4/5 stars
The Penguin Guide to Jazz Recordings	2/4 stars
The Rolling Stone Jazz Record Guide	2/5 stars

Dream Dancing is a 1978 album by Ella Fitzgerald. Thirteen of the tracks on this album were recorded in June 1972 and originally released on Fitzgerald's 1972 Atlantic album Ella Loves Cole. In 1978, Pablo Records repackaged the album with the addition of two new recordings from February 1978.

== Track listing ==
For the 1978 LP on Pablo Records; Pablo 2310 814; Re-issued by Pablo Records in 1987 on CD; PACD 2310 814-2

All songs written by Cole Porter.

Side one

1. "Dream Dancing" (New recording) – 4:02
2. "I've Got You Under My Skin" – 3:17
3. "I Concentrate on You" – 4:06
4. "My Heart Belongs to Daddy" – 2:33
5. "Love for Sale" – 4:36
6. "So Near and Yet So Far" – 2:21
7. "Down in the Depths (on the Ninetieth Floor)" – 3:40

Side two

1. "After You, Who?" (New recording) – 3:14
2. "Just One of Those Things" – 3:53
3. "I Get a Kick Out of You" – 4:21
4. "All of You" – 2:18
5. "Anything Goes" – 2:51
6. "At Long Last Love" – 2:27
7. "C'est Magnifique" – 2:32
8. "Without Love" – 2:46

== Personnel ==
- Ella Fitzgerald – vocals
- Nelson Riddle – arranger, conductor
- Jackie Davis – electronic organ
- Louie Bellson – drums
- Paul Smith – piano (track 5)
- John Heard – double bass
- Bob Tricarico, Don Christlieb – bassoon
- Mahlon Clark, Bill Green – clarinet
- Harry Klee, Wilbur Schwartz – flute
- Ralph Grasso – guitar
- Gordon Schoneberg, Norman Benno – oboe
- Bill Watrous, Christopher Riddle, Dick Noel (track 2), J. J. Johnson – trombone
- Al Aarons, Carroll Lewis, Charles Turner (track 3), Shorty Sherock – trumpet
