= Ella (Ella Fitzgerald album) =

Studio album by Ella Fitzgerald
- Released: 1969
- Recorded: May 26–30, 1969
- Genres: Pop music, jazz
- Length: 34:06
- Label: Reprise
- Producer: Richard Perry

Ella Fitzgerald chronology
Sunshine of Your Love (1969)	Ella (1969)	Things Ain't What They Used to Be (And You Better Believe It) (1970)

Professional ratings
Review scores
Source	Rating
Allmusic	3/5 stars
Rolling Stone	(favourable)

Ella is a 1969 studio album by the American jazz singer Ella Fitzgerald and the first of two albums she recorded for the Warner Bros.-owned Reprise label. This album continues the theme set on Fitzgerald's previous album, Sunshine of Your Love, mainly consisting of cover versions of popular songs from the late 1960s. The production of this recording was in the hands of Richard Perry, who had joined the Reprise label in 1967. Perry later went on to produce albums by Barbra Streisand and Diana Ross. The album was re-issued on CD with alternative artwork, in 1989. It was released together on one CD with Ella's final album recorded for Reprise label, Things Ain't What They Used to Be (And You Better Believe It).

== Background ==
The late 1960s saw Fitzgerald's recording career change greatly, the success of her Verve years (1956 to 1966) was never repeated. After the sale of Verve records to MGM Records in 1961, Norman Granz continued to manage live performances, bookings and produce Ella Fitzgerald's recordings for the label. Granz had semi-retired to Switzerland in 1960 and when Fitzgerald's contract at Verve-MGM ended in 1967 he actively sought a new label. John Hammond of Columbia Records showed interest in signing Fitzgerald, as did Capitol Records and in September 1967 Granz signed Fitzgerald with Capitol Records. The four albums recorded at Capitol Records are the most diverse albums of Fitzgerald's career, they included a country music album; Misty Blue and one of spiritual music; Brighten the Corner. Norman Granz was not involved in the production of these albums or the choice of material. Later in 1969 Granz again began producing Fitzgerald's albums, taking up this position on the live album Sunshine of Your Love recorded for the Prestige Records label, and distributed on the MPS Records label. In late 1969 Fitzgerald signed to Reprise Records and recorded two albums for the label, before returning to a Norman Granz owned label in 1972, when Granz began the Pablo Records label.

== Track listing ==
For the 1969 LP on Reprise Records; RS 6354; Re-issued by Reprise-Warner Bros. in 1989 on CD; Reprise 9 26023-2

Side One:

1. "Get Ready" (Smokey Robinson) – 2:34
2. "The Hunter Gets Captured by the Game" (Robinson) – 3:01
3. "Yellow Man" (Randy Newman) – 2:20
4. "I'll Never Fall in Love Again" (Burt Bacharach, Hal David) – 2:51
5. "Got to Get You into My Life" (John Lennon, Paul McCartney) – 3:06

Side Two:

1. "I Wonder Why" (Newman) – 3:11
2. "Ooo Baby Baby" (Warren Moore, Robinson) – 2:43
3. "Savoy Truffle" (George Harrison) – 2:47
4. "Open Your Window" (Harry Nilsson) – 2:51
5. "Knock on Wood" (Steve Cropper, Eddie Floyd) – 3:38

== Personnel ==
- Ella Fitzgerald - vocals
