= My Mom (Walter Donaldson song) =

1932 song by Walter Donaldson

"My Mom" is a popular song written by Walter Donaldson and published in 1932. Popular singer Kate Smith recorded a version that year that reached #10 on the charts. It was also successfully featured by crooner Bing Crosby, but there is no evidence that he recorded it. It was also "successfully featured" by Jimmie Grier and his Orchestra, popular crooner Rudy Vallée, Jack Miller, George Jessel, and Irene Taylor. Perhaps the most notable version of this song was recorded by Tony Bennett for his 1998 album Tony Bennett: The Playground.

== Other recorded versions ==
- Ben Selvin and his Orchestra with Rob Gobey as the featured vocalist, recorded on February 29, 1932, and released on Columbia 2628-D.
- George Olsen and His Music with Jerry Baker on vocals, recorded on March 23, 1932, and released on Victor 22967.
- Woody Herman and his Orchestra, with Herman on vocals, recorded on April 4, 1941, and released on Decca 3738.
- The Andrews Sisters with the Vic Schoen Orchestra, recorded on January 19, 1951
- Phil Regan with Jesse Crawford on the organ, recorded on January 24, 1942, and released on Decca Records.
- Russ Carlyle and his Orchestra, released in 1955.
