= Ella and Duke at the Cote D'Azur =

1967 live album by Ella Fitzgerald

Live album by Ella Fitzgerald and Duke Ellington
- Released: 1967
- Recorded: June 26–July 29, 1966
- Genre: Jazz
- Length: 497:02
- Label: Verve
- Producer: Norman Granz

Ella Fitzgerald and Duke Ellington chronology
Whisper Not (1967)	Ella and Duke at the Cote D'Azur (1967)	Brighten the Corner (1967)

Duke Ellington chronology
In the Uncommon Market (1963-66)	Ella and Duke at the Cote D' Azur (1966)	The Far East Suite (1966)

Professional ratings
Review scores
Source	Rating
Allmusic	4/5 stars
The Rolling Stone Jazz Record Guide	3/5 stars
Encyclopedia of Popular Music	4/5 stars
The Penguin Guide to Jazz Recordings	2 CD version
The Penguin Guide to Jazz Recordings	8 CD version

Ella and Duke at the Cote D'Azur is a 1967 live album by Ella Fitzgerald, accompanied by the big band of Duke Ellington.

It was recorded live at the Jazz à Juan festival at Juan-les-Pins, on the French Riviera, between June 26 and July 29, 1966. Earlier in the year, Fitzgerald and Ellington had recorded their only other live album together, The Stockholm Concert, 1966, in Stockholm.

The album was released as a double-LP in 1967. In 1998, Verve Records released the concert on compact disc, in both a two-CD version and a complete eight-CD version.

== Track listing ==
For the original 1967 Verve double LP release (Verve V6-4072-2), and the 1997 reissue on 2-CD set (Verve 539 030-2).
All tracks with Duke Ellington and His Orchestra, except tracks 3, 5 and 6 on disc one and tracks 3, 4 and 6, disc two. All tracks with Ella Fitzgerald are indicated.

=== CD 1 ===
LP, Side One

1. "Mack the Knife" (Marc Blitzstein, Bertolt Brecht, Kurt Weill) – 4:52 – Ella Fitzgerald with Duke Ellington and His Orchestra
2. "That Old Circus Train Turn-Around Blues" (Duke Ellington) – 9:59
3. "Lullaby of Birdland" (George Shearing, George David Weiss) – 2:53 – Ella Fitzgerald with the Jimmy Jones Trio

LP, Side Two

4. "Trombonio-Bustioso-Issimo" (Cat Anderson) – 4:05
5. "Goin' Out of My Head" (Teddy Randazzo, Bobby Weinstein) – 3:01 – Ella Fitzgerald with the Jimmy Jones Trio
6. "How Long Has This Been Going On?" (George Gershwin, Ira Gershwin) – 2:50 – Ella Fitzgerald with the Jimmy Jones Trio
7. "Diminuendo in Blue" / "Blow by Blow" (Ellington) – 7:36

Previously unreleased bonus track issued on disc one of the 1997 reissue

8. "Jive Jam" (Ellington) – 8:50

=== CD 2 ===
LP, Side Three

1. "It Don't Mean a Thing (If It Ain't Got That Swing)" (Ellington, Irving Mills) – 7:13 – Ella Fitzgerald with Duke Ellington and His Orchestra
2. "All Too Soon" (Ellington, Carl Sigman) – 7:39
3. "Misty" (Johnny Burke, Erroll Garner) – 3:04 – Ella Fitzgerald with the Jimmy Jones Trio

LP, Side Four

4. "Só Danço Samba" (Antonio Carlos Jobim, Vinicius de Moraes, Norman Gimbel) – 5:46 – Ella Fitzgerald with the Jimmy Jones Trio
5. "Rose of the Rio Grande" (Ross Gorman, Edgar Leslie, Harry Warren) – 3:09
6. "The More I See You" (Mack Gordon, Warren) – 3:56 – Ella Fitzgerald with the Jimmy Jones Trio
7. "The Matador (El Viti)" (Ellington) – 4:09
8. "Just Squeeze Me (But Please Don't Tease Me)" (Ellington, Lee Gaines) – 3:47 – Ella Fitzgerald with Duke Ellington and His Orchestra

Previously unreleased bonus track issued on disc two of the 1997 reissue

9. "The Trip" (Ellington) – 4:44
10. "Things Ain't What They Used to Be" (Mercer Ellington, Ted Persons) – 2:11

=== Eight disc full concert release ===
For the 1998 Verve 8CD reissue Côte d'Azur Concerts (Verve 314-539 033-2). The release comprises 110 performances, of which 88 are previously unreleased (Most part of disc eight are rehearsal takes including studio talk).

Recorded: 1-1 to 1-13 July 26; 2-1 to 3-14, 8-16 July 27; 4-1 to 5-12, 8-1 to 8-15 July 28; 6-1 to 7-14 July 29, 1966

Disc One
Duke Ellington and His Orchestra

1. "Diminuendo in Blue" / "Blow by Blow" (Duke Ellington) – 8:06
2. "Caravan" (Ellington, Irving Mills, Juan Tizol) – 6:06
3. "Rose of the Rio Grande" (Ross Gorman, Edgar Leslie, Harry Warren) – 2:51
4. "Tutti for Cootie" (Ellington, Jimmy Hamilton) – 6:24
5. "Skin Deep" (Louie Bellson) – 10:49
6. "Passion Flower" (Billy Strayhorn) – 4:51
7. "Things Ain't What They Used to Be" (Mercer Ellington, Ted Persons) – 3:02
8. "Wings and Things" (Johnny Hodges) – 10:27
9. "The Star-Crossed Lovers" (D. Ellington, Strayhorn) – 4:20
10. "Such Sweet Thunder" (D. Ellington, Strayhorn) – 3:24
11. "Madness in Great Ones" (D. Ellington, Strayhorn) – 5:23
12. "Kinda Dukish" / "Rockin' in Rhythm" (Harry Carney, D. Ellington, Mills) – 5:07
13. "Things Ain't What They Used to Be" – 2:35

Disc Two
Duke Ellington and His Orchestra featuring Ella Fitzgerald on tracks 9–11.

1. "Main Stem" (D. Ellington) – 3:53
2. Medley: "Black and Tan Fantasy" / "Creole Love Call" / "The Mooche" (D. Ellington, Bubber Miley) – 8:55
3. "West Indian Pancake" (D. Ellington) – 4:45
4. "El Viti" (Gerald Wilson) – 4:01
5. "The Opener" (D. Ellington) – 3:01
6. "La Plus Belle Africane" (D. Ellington) – 11:50
7. "Azure" (D. Ellington, Mills) – 7:44
8. Duke Ellington introduces Ella Fitzgerald – 1:05
9. "Let's Do It, Let's Fall in Love" (Cole Porter) – 4:08
10. "Satin Doll" (D. Ellington, Johnny Mercer, Strayhorn) – 3:16
11. "Cotton Tail" (D. Ellington) – 7:07
12. "Take the "A" Train" (Strayhorn) – 5:47

Disc Three
Duke Ellington and His Orchestra

1. "Take the "A" Train" – 0:55
2. "Such Sweet Thunder" – 3:06
3. "Half the Fun" (D. Ellington, Strayhorn) – 4:24
4. "Madness in Great Ones" – 5:26
5. "The Star-Crossed Lovers" – 4:21
6. "I Got It Bad (and That Ain't Good)" (D. Ellington, Paul Francis Webster) – 2:18
7. "Things Ain't What They Used to Be" – 2:28
8. "Wings and Things" – 8:26
9. "Kinda Dukish" / "Rockin' in Rhythm" – 5:10
10. "Chelsea Bridge" (Strayhorn) – 4:18
11. "Skin Deep" – 12:12
12. "Sophisticated Lady" (D. Ellington, Mills, Parish) – 4:13
13. "Jam with Sam" (D. Ellington) – 3:19
14. "Things Ain't What They Used to Be" – 2:18

Disc Four
Duke Ellington and His Orchestra

1. "Soul Call" (Bellson) – 2:41
2. "West Indian Pancake" – 4:37
3. "El Viti" – 1:19
4. "The Opener" – 3:08
5. "La Plus Belle Africane" – 13:23
6. "Take the "A" Train" – 4:24
7. "Trombonio-Bustoso-Issimo" (Cat Anderson) – 4:21
8. "Such Sweet Thunder" – 3:11
9. "Half the Fun" – 4:15
10. "Madness in Great Ones" – 4:15
11. "The Star-Crossed Lovers" – 4:20
12. "Prelude to a Kiss" (D. Ellington, Strayhorn) – 4:26
13. "Things Ain't What They Used to Be" – 2:27

Disc Five
Duke Ellington and His Orchestra featuring Ella Fitzgerald on all tracks, except track 1.

1. "The Old Circus Train Turn-Around Blues" (D. Ellington) – 11:29
2. "Thou Swell" (Richard Rodgers, Lorenz Hart) – 1:39
3. "Satin Doll" – 2:42
4. "Wives and Lovers" (Burt Bacharach, Hal David) – 2:22
5. "Something to Live For" – 4:13
6. "Let's Do It, Let's Fall in Love" – 4:06
7. "The More I See You" (Mack Gordon, Warren) – 3:57
8. "Goin' Out of My Head" – 3:01
9. "So Danco Samba" (Antonio Carlos Jobim, Vinicius de Moraes, Norman Gimbel) – 5:49
10. "Lullaby of Birdland" (George Shearing, George David Weiss) – 2:53
11. "How Long Has This Been Going On?" (George Gershwin, Ira Gershwin) – 3:07
12. "Mack the Knife" (Kurt Weill, Bertolt Brecht, Marc Blitzstein) – 5:01

Disc Six
Duke Ellington and His Orchestra featuring Ella Fitzgerald on tracks 12–16.

1. Medley: "Black and Tan Fantasy" / "Creole Love Call" / "The Mooche" (Duke Ellington, Bubber Miley) – 9:42
2. "Soul Call" – 4:33
3. "West Indian Pancake" – 4:43
4. "El Viti" – 4:09
5. "La Plus Belle Africane" – 12:30
6. "Such Sweet Thunder" – 3:12
7. "Half the Fun" – 4:20
8. "Madness in Great Ones" – 5:00
9. "The Star-Crossed Lovers" – 4:08
10. "Wings and Things" – 3:22
11. "Things Ain't What They Used to Be" – 1:58
12. "Thou Swell" – 2:00
13. "Satin Doll" – 2:42
14. "Wives and Lovers" – 2:29
15. "Something to Live For" (D. Ellington, Strayhorn) – 3:23
16. "Let's Do It (Let's Fall in Love)" – 3:26

Disc Seven
Duke Ellington and His Orchestra featuring Ella Fitzgerald on tracks 1–8 and 13–14.

1. "Sweet Georgia Brown" (Ben Bernie, Kenneth Casey, Maceo Pinkard) – 3:36
2. "Goin' Out of My Head" – 3:34
3. "So Danco Samba" – 6:07
4. "Lullaby of Birdland" – 3:06
5. "Moment of Truth" (Tex Satterwhite, Frank Scott) – 2:14
6. "Misty" (Erroll Garner, Johnny Burke) – 3:26
7. "Mack the Knife" – 5:36
8. "Cotton Tail" – 7:13
9. "The Trip" (D. Ellington) – 4:44
10. "Juve Jam" (D. Ellington) – 9:34
11. "All Too Soon" (D. Ellington, Carl Sigman) – 7:18
12. "The Old Circus Train Turn-Around Blues" – 7:18
13. "It Don't Mean a Thing (If It Ain't Got That Swing)" (D. Ellington, Mills) – 7:14
14. "Just Squeeze Me (But Please Don't Tease Me)" (D. Ellington, Lee Gaines) – 4:27

Disc Eight
Duke Ellington and His Orchestra

1. "The Old Circus Train Turn-Around Blues" – 1:09
2. "The Old Circus Train Turn-Around Blues" – 1:31
3. "The Old Circus Train Turn-Around Blues" – 1:50
4. "The Old Circus Train Turn-Around Blues" – 1:11
5. "The Old Circus Train Turn-Around Blues" – 2:40
6. "The Old Circus Train Turn-Around Blues" – 3:38
7. "The Old Circus Train Turn-Around Blues" – 2:00
8. "Blue Fuse No. 2" (D. Ellington) – 1:39
9. "Blue Fuse No. 2" – 0:44
10. "Blue Fuse No. 1" (D. Ellington) – 0:37
11. "Blue Fuse No. 1" – 0:51
12. "Blue Fuse No. 1" – 2:57
13. "The Shepherd" (D. Ellington) – 2:33
14. "The Old Circus Train Turn-Around Blues" – 4:44
15. "The Old Circus Train Turn-Around Blues" – 8:07
16. "Tingling Is a Happiness" (D. Ellington) – 4:00

== Personnel ==
Performance

- Ella Fitzgerald – vocals
  - Jimmy Jones – piano
  - Jim Hughart – bass
  - Grady Tate – drums
- Duke Ellington Orchestra:
  - Cat Anderson – trumpet
  - Lawrence Brown – trombone
  - Harry Carney – clarinet, baritone sax
  - Buster Cooper – trombone, claves
  - Duke Ellington – piano
  - Mercer Ellington – trumpet
  - Paul Gonsalves – tenor sax
  - Jimmy Hamilton – clarinet, tenor saxophone
  - Johnny Hodges – alto sax
  - Herbie Jones – trumpet, guiro
  - John Lamb – bass
  - Ray Nance – trumpet, violin, vocals
  - Russell Procope – clarinet, alto saxophone
  - Ben Webster – tenor saxophone
  - Cootie Williams – trumpet
  - Sam Woodyard – drums

Technical

- Duke Ellington – arranger
- Norman Granz – liner notes
- Jean-Pierre Leloir – photography
- Billy Strayhorn – arranger

Reissue

- Chika Azuma – art direction
- Claude Carriere – liner notes
- Deborah Hay – editorial assistant
- Chris Herles – mastering
- Tom Greenwood – production assistant
- Suha Gur – mastering
- Brian Priestley – liner notes
- Peter Pullman – liner notes, booklet editor
- Kevin Reeves – mastering
- Richard Seidel – executive producer
- Cynthia Sesso – photo research
- Robert Silverberg – production assistant
- Michael Ullman – liner notes
- Suzanne White – package design, package coordinator
- Ben Young – liner notes, supervisor
