= The Playground (album) =

Studio album by Tony Bennett
- Released: September 29, 1998
- Recorded: February–June 1998
- Genre: Jazz, children's music
- Label: Sony
- Producer: Tony Bennett, Danny Bennett, Phil Ramone

Tony Bennett chronology
Tony Bennett on Holiday (1997)	The Playground (1998)	Bennett Sings Ellington: Hot & Cool (1999)

Professional ratings
Review scores
Source	Rating
AllMusic	4/5 stars
Los Angeles Times	favorable

The Playground is a children's music album by Tony Bennett, released in 1998.

On November 8, 2011, Sony Music Distribution included the CD in a box set entitled The Complete Collection.

== Track listing ==
1. "The Playground" (Alan Bergman, Marilyn Bergman, Bill Evans) – 3:36
2. "Ac-Cent-Tchu-Ate the Positive" (Harold Arlen, Johnny Mercer) – 2:37
3. "Dat Dere" (Oscar Brown Jr., Bobby Timmons) – 3:17
4. "Little Things" - duet with Elmo (Joe Raposo) – 3:09
5. "Put On a Happy Face" - duet with Rosie O'Donnell (Charles Strouse, Lee Adams) (from the musical Bye Bye Birdie) – 3:01
6. "Because We're Kids" (Dr. Seuss, Frederick Hollander) – 3:25
7. "My Mom" (Walter Donaldson) – 4:38
8. "Swinging on a Star" (Johnny Burke, Jimmy Van Heusen) – 2:04
9. "Bein' Green" - duet with Kermit the Frog (Raposo) – 2:41
10. "Firefly" - duet with Kermit the Frog (Cy Coleman, Carolyn Leigh) – 1:32
11. "When You Wish Upon a Star" (Leigh Harline, Ned Washington) – 2:58
12. "(It's Only) A Paper Moon" (Arlen, Yip Harburg, Billy Rose) – 2:49
13. "The Inchworm" (Frank Loesser) – 2:41
14. "The Bare Necessities" (Terry Gilkyson) – 2:09
15. "Make the World Your Own" (Alan Bergman, Marilyn Bergman, Michel Legrand) – 3:48
16. "All God's Chillun Got Rhythm" (Walter Jurmann, Gus Kahn, Bronislaw Kaper) – 2:10
17. "It's Christmas in Herald Square" (Tony Tamburello/Joyce Vintaloro) – 3:25

== Personnel ==
- Tony Bennett – vocals
- Ralph Sharon – piano
- Gray Sargent – guitar
- Paul Langosch – double bass
- Clayton Cameron – drums
