= The Duke at Tanglewood =

1966 live album by Duke Ellington

Live album by Duke Ellington with the Boston Pops Orchestra conducted by Arthur Fiedler
- Released: 1966
- Recorded: July 28, 1965
- Venues: Tanglewood, Lennox, Massachusetts
- Genre: Jazz
- Labels: RCA Victor Red Seal; LM-2857
- Producer: Peter Dellheim

Duke Ellington chronology
Cool Rock (1965)	The Duke at Tanglewood (1966)	Ella at Duke's Place (1965)

The Duke at Tanglewood is a live album by American pianist, composer and bandleader Duke Ellington fronting the Boston Pops Orchestra conducted by Arthur Fiedler which was recorded at Tanglewood and released on RCA Victor's classical Red Seal label.

The album was eventually reissued (probably in 1977) on the Pickwick label (in Canada, on 8-track tape), with a completely different album cover.

== Reception ==
Professional ratings
Review scores
Source	Rating
AllMusic	1/5 stars
Record Mirror	3/5 stars

The AllMusic review by Scott Yanow stated: "Ellington's piano is fine throughout this LP but unfortunately the arrangements were written by Richard Hayman and are hilariously overblown and pompous; 'Caravan' is an unintentional scream. Those Ellington collectors without a strong sense of humor are obliged to skip this odd greatest-hits performance".

== Chart performance ==
The album debuted on Billboard magazine's Top LP's chart in the issue dated May 14, 1966, peaking at No. 145 during a three-week run on the chart.

== Track listing ==
All compositions by Duke Ellington except where noted

1. "Caravan" (Juan Tizol, Duke Ellington, Irving Mills) – 4:48
2. "Mood Indigo" (Ellington, Barney Bigard, Mills) – 3:00
3. "The Mooch" (Ellington, Mills) – 3:29
4. "Love Scene" – 2:31
5. "I Let a Song Go Out of My Heart" (Ellington, Mills, Henry Nemo, John Redmond) – 2:52
6. "I'm Beginning to See the Light" (Ellington, Don George, Johnny Hodges, Harry James) – 2:43
7. "Do Nothing till You Hear from Me" (Ellington, Bob Russell) – 2:45
8. "Sophisticated Lady" (Ellington, Mills, Mitchell Parish) – 3:23
9. "Timon of Athens March" – 3:07
10. "Solitude" (Ellington, Eddie DeLange, Mills) – 3:02
11. "I Got It Bad (and That Ain't Good)" (Ellington, Paul Francis Webster) – 4:11
12. "Satin Doll" (Ellington, Billy Strayhorn, Johnny Mercer) – 2:32

== Personnel ==
- Duke Ellington – piano, arranger on track 9
- Boston Pops Orchestra conducted by Arthur Fiedler
- Richard Hayman – arranger on tracks 1–5, 7–8, 10–12
- Patrick Hollenbeck – arranger on track 6
