= Hello, Dolly! (Ella Fitzgerald album) =

Studio album by Ella Fitzgerald
- Released: July 1964
- Recorded: March 3–4, April 7, 1964
- Genre: Jazz
- Length: 39:13
- Label: Verve
- Producer: Norman Granz

Ella Fitzgerald chronology
These Are the Blues (1963)	Hello, Dolly! (1964)	Ella Fitzgerald Sings the Johnny Mercer Songbook (1964)

Professional ratings
Review scores
Source	Rating
AllMusic	3.5/5 stars

Hello, Dolly! is a 1964 studio album by the American jazz singer Ella Fitzgerald.

"Hello, Dolly!", "People", "Can't Buy Me Love", and "The Sweetest Sounds" were recorded in London, England, on April 7. The other eight tracks were recorded in New York City on March 3 and March 4. Three songs recorded at the latter sessions remain unreleased: "There! I've Said It Again", "I'll See You in My Dreams", and "There Are Such Things". It is unknown whether the recordings exist in the Verve Records vaults today.

Her version of the Beatles song "Can't Buy Me Love" was a minor hit single in 1964, peaking at No. 34 in the UK singles chart.

== Track listing ==
For the 1964 Verve LP release; Verve V6-4064; Re-issued in 2005 on CD, Verve B0004675-02

Side One
No.	Title	Writer(s)	Length
1.	"Hello, Dolly!"	Jerry Herman	2:55
2.	"People"	Bob Merrill, Jule Styne	3:48
3.	"Can't Buy Me Love"	John Lennon, Paul McCartney	2:39
4.	"The Sweetest Sounds"	Richard Rodgers	2:08
5.	"Miss Otis Regrets"	Cole Porter	3:56
6.	"My Man"	Jacques Charles, Channing Pollock, Albert Willemetz, Maurice Yvain	4:01

Side Two
No.	Title	Writer(s)	Length
1.	"How High the Moon?"	Nancy Hamilton, Morgan Lewis	4:01
2.	"Volare"	Franco Migliacci, Domenico Modugno, Mitchell Parish	2:42
3.	"The Thrill Is Gone"	Lew Brown, Ray Henderson	3:23
4.	"Memories of You"	Eubie Blake, Andy Razaf	2:49
5.	"Lullaby of the Leaves"	Bernice Petkere, Joe Young	2:56
6.	"Pete Kelly's Blues"	Sammy Cahn, Ray Heindorf	3:56

== Personnel ==
Recorded March 3–4, 1964, New York City:

Tracks 5–12

- Ella Fitzgerald – vocals
- Frank DeVol – arranger, conductor
- Zoot Sims – tenor saxophone
- Hank Jones – piano on track 8
- Others unknown

Recorded April 7, 1964, London:

Tracks 1–4

- Ella Fitzgerald - vocals
- Johnnie Spence - conductor
- Henri René - arranger on track 1
- Others unknown
