= Lady Time =

Studio album by Ella Fitzgerald
- Released: 1978
- Recorded: June 19–20, 1978
- Genre: Jazz
- Length: 42:20
- Label: Pablo
- Producer: Norman Granz

Ella Fitzgerald chronology
Montreux '77 (1977)	Lady Time (1978)	Dream Dancing (1978)

Professional ratings
Review scores
Source	Rating
AllMusic	3/5 stars
The Penguin Guide to Jazz Recordings	2.5/4 stars
The Rolling Stone Jazz Record Guide	3/5 stars

Lady Time is a 1978 (see 1978 in music) studio album by the American jazz singer Ella Fitzgerald, accompanied by the unusual combination of an organist, Jackie Davis, and a drummer, Louie Bellson.

== Track listing ==
1. "I'm Walkin'" (Dave Bartholomew, Fats Domino) – 5:36
2. "All or Nothing at All" (Arthur Altman, Jack Lawrence) – 6:29
3. "I Never Had a Chance" (Irving Berlin) – 4:03
4. "I Cried for You" (Gus Arnheim, Arthur Freed, Abe Lyman) – 3:17
5. "What Will I Tell My Heart?" (Irving Gordon, Lawrence, Peter Tinturin) – 1:57
6. "Since I Fell for You" (Buddy Johnson) – 4:26
7. "And the Angels Sing" (Ziggy Elman, Johnny Mercer) – 3:07
8. "Confessin'" (Doc Daugherty, Al J. Neiburg, Ellis Reynolds) – 2:50
9. "Mack the Knife" (Marc Blitzstein, Bertolt Brecht, Kurt Weill) – 2:57
10. "That's My Desire" (Helmy Kressa, Carroll Loveday) – 3:02
11. "I'm in the Mood for Love" (Dorothy Fields, Jimmy McHugh) – 4:36

== Personnel ==
Recorded June 19, June 20, 1978, in Hollywood, Los Angeles:

- Ella Fitzgerald – vocals
- Jackie Davis – organ
- Louie Bellson – drums
