= Richard Hayman =

American musician

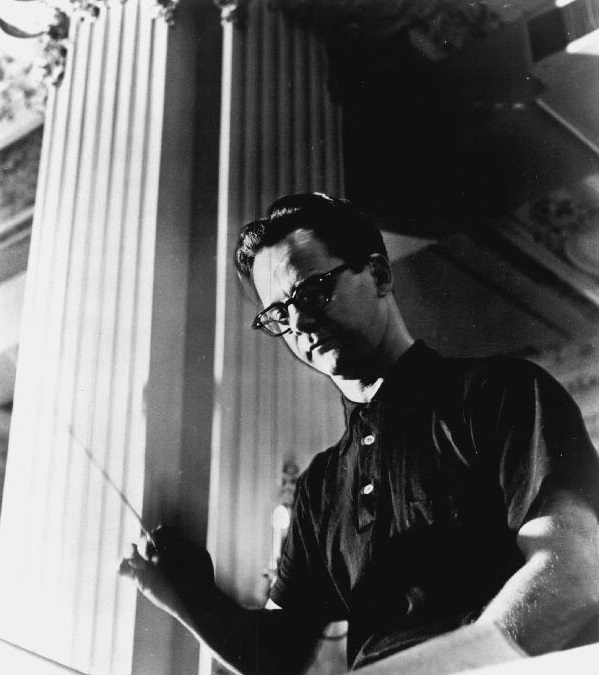
Hayman in 1966

Richard Warren Joseph Hayman (March 27, 1920 – February 5, 2014) was an American musician who was the chief music arranger of the Boston Pops Orchestra for over 50 years, and served as a pops conductor for orchestras including the Detroit Symphony Orchestra, the St. Louis Symphony and the Grand Rapids Symphony in Grand Rapids, Michigan.

He toured and recorded as a harmonica player and made dozens of recordings for Mercury Records as "Richard Hayman and His Orchestra." His biggest hit was a single, "Ruby," from the 1952 film Ruby Gentry, starring Jennifer Jones and Charlton Heston. Hayman's arrangement featured himself as harmonica soloist. Over a lengthy career, he created musical arrangements for more than 50 artists and entertainers including Barbra Streisand, Bob Hope, Liza Minnelli and Olivia Newton-John.

== Career ==
A native of Cambridge, Massachusetts, United States, Hayman's career in music began in his teen years as a player and arranger for the Borrah Minnevitch Harmonica Rascals. In the 1940s, he became an arranger for Metro-Goldwyn-Mayer studios doing arrangements (often uncredited) for such MGM films as Girl Crazy, Meet Me in St. Louis and Thousands Cheer. From 1945 to 1950, he was musical director for the Vaughn Monroe Orchestra.

In the 1950s and 1960s, Hayman recorded a series of albums for Mercury Records. His 1957 outing Havana In Hi-Fi, was first in the label's pop music stereo LP series (SR 60000).

Hayman is most famous for having been the principal arranger at the Boston Pops Orchestra for over 30 years where his award-winning arrangements are still used today. He occasionally guest-conducted there, and when Arthur Fiedler had a time conflict with his job as pops conductor for the Detroit Symphony Orchestra, he recommended Hayman for the post.

Hayman was also closely affiliated with the St. Louis Symphony Orchestra for over 30 years. Known for his sequined jackets, harmonica solos, and corny jokes, he became its Principal Pops Conductor in 1976, leading both the Pops at Powell and Queeny Park concerts. Queeny Pops, with concertgoers seated at tables in the acoustically atrocious but centrally located (in the suburbs of west St. Louis County) Greensfelder Field House, was a hit for many years, and made it possible for the SLSO to offer its musicians a full 52-week annual contract.

That ended when a financial crunch in 2001, coinciding with a realization that the SLSO's pops concerts had not changed with the times, led to the cancellation of the Queeny Pops series and a marked reduction in overall pops concerts by the orchestra.

In 1985, he was appointed Principal Pops Conductor of the Grand Rapids Symphony, serving more than 21 seasons until his retirement in 2006 after which he was named Pops Conductor Laureate. Hayman founded and conducted the Florida Sunshine Pops orchestra in Boca Raton and continued to make guest conducting appearances in the United States and Europe.

His biggest hit was the 1953 single "Ruby". Hayman took the theme for the motion picture Ruby Gentry, and through his specially stylized arrangement, utilizing a harmonica as the solo instrument with a large, quasi-symphonic orchestra, the song zoomed to the top of the hit parade all over the world and brought about a renewed interest in the harmonica. It should also be mentioned that the flip side of the 45 rpm and 78 rpm single hit "Ruby" was the hit "Dansero" (Note: Hayman co-composed "Dansero" in 1953 with Lee Daniels (né Daniel Hirsh; 1916–1972). Sol Parker (né Solomon Peskin; 1919–2010) wrote the lyrics. Parker was Frank Sinatra's manager until 1962. Daniels, in 1953, was a teacher of piano, voice, and show business at the Berklee College of Music, then known as the Schillinger House. Lee Daniels, with Lawrence Berk, was co-founder of Berklee. Lee Daniels' given name added to Lawrence Berk's surname (i.e., Berk + Lee) is the namesake of the college.) which also became an international hit.

He continued to chart into the early 1960s with titles such as "Night Train".

Hayman's last event with the St. Louis Symphony Orchestra, where he held the title of Pops Conductor Emeritus, took place on June 27, 2010, to honor his 90th birthday. The St. Louis Metro Singers, who performed with him at many Pops concerts, were also on stage at the event.

Hayman is also noted for albums now regarded as Exotica.

== Death ==
Hayman died at a hospice in New York on February 5, 2014. He was 93.

== Discography ==
=== As conductor ===
Date of Release	Title	Label	Notes
1953	Simonetta	Mercury	sheet music
1954	Music For A Quiet Evening	Mercury	
1956	Serenade For Love	Mercury	
1956	Come With Me To Faraway Places	Mercury	
1956	Reminiscing With Richard Hayman	Mercury	
1956	Love Is A Many-Splendored Thing	Mercury	
1956	Time For Listening	Mercury	
1957	Two Tickets To Paris	Mercury	Hayman plays accordion
1957	My Fair Lady	Mercury	
1957	Music For People Who Can't Sleep	Mercury	
1957	Havana In Hi-Fi	Mercury	
1958	Plays Great Motion Picture Themes Of Victor Young	Mercury	
1959	Voodoo!	Mercury	
1959	Caramba! Exotic Sounds Of The Americas	Mercury	
1960	Conducts Pop Concert In Sound	Mercury	
1960	Campfire Songs	Mercury	
1961	Harmonica Holiday	Mercury	see Charles Leighton
1962	Gypsy	Mercury	
1962	Songs Of Wonderful Girls	Mercury	
1963	The Music Of Cleopatra	Time	
1967	Classics In Pop!	Mercury	
1967	Melodies Of Love	Mainstream	
1969	Genuine Electric Latin Love Machine	Command	
1969	Cinemagic Sounds	Command	
1973	Electronic Evolutions	Command	with Walter Sear
1974	Million Dollar Motion Picture Themes	Musicor	
1974	Marlon Brando's Great Movie Themes	RCA Victor	
1980	Tender Moments	Time	with The Manhattan Pops Orchestra
1980	Italy, The Pride & Passion	Bainbridge	with The Manhattan Pops Orchestra
1981	Ruby	AFE	
1987	Harlem Nocturne	KEM-Disc	
1989	Rhapsody In Blue • Piano Concerto	Naxos	with the Slovak Philharmonic Orchestra and the Slovak Radio Symphony Orchestra
1989	Star Trek: A Journey Through The Galaxies	Naxos International	with the Philharmonic Rock Orchestra
1989	Star Wars (The Music Of John Williams And Other Composers)	Naxos International	with the Philharmonic Rock Orchestra
1989	Silent Night	Naxos International	
1989	A Christmas Festival	Naxos International	
1989	Joy To The World	Naxos International	with the Philharmonic Symphony Orchestra
1990	To All The Girls I've Loved Before (The Julio Iglesias Songbook)	Naxos International	
1990	The Greatest Love Of All	Naxos International	
1990	Melodies Of Love	Naxos International	
1990	Majestic Marches	Naxos	with the Slovak Philharmonic Orchestra
1991	Viva Espana And Mexico	Naxos International	
1991	Vintage Broadway	Naxos International	
1995	Remembering Duke Ellington	Naxos	with the RTÉ Concert Orchestra
2006	The Music Of Henry Mancini	Naxos	
Unknown	Motion Picture Themes	Time	with The Manhattan Pops Orchestra
Unknown	Presents The Electric People	Murbo	
Unknown	Fabulous Generation Of Motion Picture Themes	Time	
Unknown	Broadway Hits And Other Themes	Time	
Unknown	Themes From Great Films	Time	with Hugo Montenegro

=== As arranger ===
Date of Release	Artist	Title	Label	Notes
1954	Sophie Tucker	Golden Jubilee (Fifty Golden Years)	Mercury	
1955	Helen Merrill	Helen Merrill with Strings	Emarcy	First six tracks only
1956	Morgana King	For You, For Me, Forevermore	Emarcy	
1957	Belmonte And His Orchestra	Belmonte Plays Latin For Americans	RCA Victor	One track only
1959	Arthur Fiedler And The Boston Pops Orchestra	Pops Christmas Party	RCA Red Seal	One track only
1959	Arthur Fiedler And The Boston Pops Orchestra	Song Of India	RCA Victor	One track only
1960	The Don Baker Trio	Hammond For Dancing	Capitol Records	One track only
1961	Orchestra Del Oro	Soul Of Harlem	Sonodor	One track only
1961	Kai Winding's Trombones And Orchestra	Kai Olé	Verve	One track only
1961	The Jonah Jones Quartet	Great Instrumental Hits Styled By Jonah Jones	Capitol	One track only
1961	Arthur Fiedler And The Boston Pops Orchestra	Music From: Guys & Dolls / Greenwillow / The Most Happiest Fella / Hans Christian Andersen / Where's Charley?	RCA Victor Red Seal	Fifteen tracks only
1962	Arthur Fiedler And The Boston Pops Orchestra	No Strings - State Fair	RCA Victor Red Seal	Six tracks only
1962	Arthur Fiedler And The Boston Pops Orchestra	Pops Roundup	RCA Victor Red Seal	Six tracks only
1963	Arthur Fiedler And The Boston Pops Orchestra	Star Dust	RCA Victor Red Seal	Four tracks only
1964	Arthur Fiedler And The Boston Pops Orchestra	Slaughter on Tenth Avenue (And Other Hits From The Big Shows)	RCA Victor Red Seal	Three tracks only
1964	Arthur Fiedler And The Boston Pops Orchestra	"Pops" Goes The Trumpet (Holiday For Brass)	RCA Victor Red Seal	Three tracks only
1965	Vivienne Dells Chiesa	The New Vivienne Della Chiesa	20th Century Fox Records	Co-arranged with Sid Bass
1965	Paul Nero, Arthur Fiedler And The Boston Pops Orchestra	Nero Goes "Pops"	RCA Victor Red Seal	Six tracks only
1966	Chet Atkins, Arthur Fiedler And The Boston Pops Orchestra	The "Pops" Goes Country	RCA Victor Red Seal	
1966	Arthur Fiedler And The Boston Pops Orchestra	All The Things You Are	RCA Victor Red Seal	
1966	Duke Ellington, Arthur Fiedler And The Boston Pops Orchestra	The Duke at Tanglewood	RCA Victor Red Seal	
1969	Arthur Fiedler And The Boston Pops Orchestra	Play The Beatles	RCA Red Seal	Ten tracks only
1970	Chet Atkins	This Is Chet Atkins	RCA Victor	Three tracks only
1970	Arthur Fiedler And The Boston Pops Orchestra	A Christmas Festival	Polydor	One track only
1970	Arthur Fiedler And The Boston Pops Orchestra	Fabulous Broadway	Polydor	Three tracks only
1970	Arthur Fiedler And The Boston Pops Orchestra	Motion Picture Classics	RCA Red Seal	Eighteen tracks only
1971	Arthur Fiedler And The Boston Pops Orchestra	Arthur Fiedler Superstar	Polydor	Four tracks only
1972	Arthur Fiedler And The Boston Pops Orchestra	Play The Music Of Paul Simon	Polydor	
1972	Arthur Fiedler And The Boston Pops Orchestra	What The World Needs Now (The Burt Bacharach-Hal David Songbook)	Polydor	Six tracks only
1972	Arthur Fiedler And The Boston Pops Orchestra	Gotta Travel On	Polydor	
1972	Arthur Fiedler And The Boston Pops Orchestra	Forgotten Dreams	Polydor	Three tracks only
1973	Arthur Fiedler And The Boston Pops Orchestra	Greatest Hits Of The '20s	RCA	Five tracks only
1973	Arthur Fiedler And The Boston Pops Orchestra	Greatest Hits Of The '30s	RCA	Six tracks only
1973	Arthur Fiedler And The Boston Pops Orchestra	Greatest Hits Of The '40s	RCA	Five tracks only
1973	Arthur Fiedler And The Boston Pops Orchestra	Greatest Hits Of The '60s	RCA	
1973	Arthur Fiedler And The Boston Pops Orchestra	Greatest Hits Of The '70s	RCA	Six tracks only
1974	Arthur Fiedler And The Boston Pops Orchestra	Fiedler In Rags	Polydor	Three tracks only
1974	Arthur Fiedler And The Boston Pops Orchestra	You Will Be My Music	Polydor	
1975	Strings For Pleasure	Play The Music Of John, Paul, George & Ringo	Music For Pleasure	Nine tracks only
1975	Arthur Fiedler And The Boston Pops Orchestra	Play The Neil Diamond Songbook	Polydor	One track only
1980	Ettore Stratta And London Symphony Orchestra	Music From The Galaxies	CBS	
1985	Sarah Vaughan	The Rodgers & Hart Songbook	PolyGram	One track only
1987	Helen Kardon	What Matters Most	KDM	
1989	Erich Kunzel And Cincinnati Pops Orchestra	Victory At Sea And Other Favorites	Telarc	Two tracks only
