= Ella at Duke's Place =

1965 album by Ella Fitzgerald

Studio album by Ella Fitzgerald and Duke Ellington
- Released: 1965
- Recorded: October 18–20, 1965
- Studio: United, Hollywood
- Genre: Jazz
- Length: 47:04
- Label: Verve
- Producer: Norman Granz

Ella Fitzgerald and Duke Ellington chronology
Ella in Hamburg (1965)	Ella at Duke's Place (1965)	The Stockholm Concert, 1966 (1984)

Duke Ellington chronology
The Duke at Tanglewood (1965)	Ella at Dukes Place (1965)	A Concert of Sacred Music (1965)

Professional ratings
Review scores
Source	Rating
AllMusic	4.5/5 stars
Encyclopedia of Popular Music	4/5 stars
The Penguin Guide to Jazz Recordings	3/4 stars

Ella at Duke's Place is a 1965 studio album by Ella Fitzgerald and Duke Ellington, accompanied by his Orchestra. While it was the second (and last) studio album made by Fitzgerald and Ellington, following the 1957 song book recording, a live double album Ella and Duke at the Cote D'Azur was recorded in 1966. Ella at Duke's Place was nominated for Best Female Pop Vocal Performance at the 1967 Grammy Awards.

== Track listing ==
For the 1965 Verve LP album, Verve V6-4070; re-issued by PolyGram-Verve on CD in 1996: Verve-PolyGram 529 700–2.

Side One:

1. "Something to Live For" (Duke Ellington, Billy Strayhorn) – 3:35
2. "A Flower Is a Lovesome Thing" (a.k.a. "Passion") (Strayhorn) – 5:00
3. "Passion Flower" (Strayhorn) – 4:39
4. "I Like the Sunrise" – 3:26
5. "Azure" (Irving Mills) – 6:48

Side Two:

1. "Imagine My Frustration" (Strayhorn, Gerald Stanley Wilson) – 4:49
2. "Duke's Place" (a.k.a. "C Jam Blues") (Bill Katz, Ruth Roberts, Bob Thiele) – 4:13
3. "Brown-skin Gal (in the Calico Gown)" (Paul Francis Webster) – 5:05
4. "What Am I Here For?" (Frankie Laine) – 5:35
5. "Cotton Tail" – 3:41
- All songs composed by Duke Ellington, with the exception of "A Flower Is a Lovesome Thing" and "Passion Flower". Lyricists indicated.
- Recorded October 18–20, 1965, at United Recorders, Hollywood, Los Angeles.

== Personnel ==
Tracks 1–10

- Ella Fitzgerald – vocals
- Duke Ellington – conductor, composer, lyricist, arranger, piano
- Jimmy Jones – arranger, piano
- Cat Anderson – trumpet
- Mercer Ellington – trumpet
- Herb Jones – trumpet
- Cootie Williams – trumpet
- Lawrence Brown – trombone
- Buster Cooper – trombone
- Chuck Connors – bass trombone
- Johnny Hodges – alto saxophone
- Russell Procope – alto saxophone
- Paul Gonsalves – tenor saxophone
- Jimmy Hamilton – tenor saxophone, clarinet
- Harry Carney – baritone saxophone, bass clarinet
- John Lamb – bass
- Louis Bellson – drums

Album produced by Norman Granz
Engineering by Val Valentin
