= Single-O =

"Single-O" is a song composed by Donald Kahn, with lyrics by Johnny Mercer. It was released in 1964.

== Notable recordings ==
- Ella Fitzgerald - Ella Fitzgerald Sings the Johnny Mercer Songbook (1964)
