= Lullaby of the Leaves =

Song by Bernice Petkere and Joe Young, c. 1932

Song
- Genre: Jazz
- Songwriters: Bernice Petkere, Joe Young

"Lullaby of the Leaves" is a musical composition by composer Bernice Petkere and lyricist Joe Young. A Tin Pan Alley song first performed in 1932, the jazz standard is considered the biggest critical and commercial success of Petkere's composing career.

The song was a hit for George Olsen and his Music in 1932. By January 1933, more than 50,000 copies had been sold in the U.S.—ten times more than the usual hit song of the era.

It has since been recorded numerous times in its lyrical version and as an instrumental, including hot jazz sextet version by Benny Goodman in 1951, a haunting bop-accented rendition by Anita O'Day in 1952, a cool jazz version by Cal Tjader on vibraphone in 1952, a rousing surf rock version by the Ventures in 1961, a lively piano version by Mary Lou Williams in the 1950s, and a widely heard version by Ella Fitzgerald on her 1964 album Hello, Dolly!. Since 2002, jazz pianist Tamir Hendelman has been performing his unique arrangement of the song, especially as part of the Jeff Hamilton Trio.

The song was released in "Imagination", a 1958 album recorded by Billy Eckstine, with Pete Rugolo Orchestra. EmArcy label.

In 2017, British artist The Caretaker (James Leyland Kirby) would sample George Olsen's and Layton & Johnstone's covers of the songs in his album Everywhere at the End of Time Stage 2 and Stage 3 in "C2 - Misplaced in time" and "F2 - Drifting time misplaced" respectively.

From 2019 to 2020, Italian ice dancers Jasmine Tessari and Francesco Fioretti skated to Beth Hart's rendition of the song in competitions.
