= Ella Loves Cole =

Studio album by Ella Fitzgerald
- Released: 1972
- Recorded: June 13, 1972
- Genre: Jazz
- Length: 36:31
- Label: Atlantic
- Producer: Norman Granz

Ella Fitzgerald chronology
Ella in Budapest, Hungary (1999)	Ella Loves Cole (1972)	Ella à Nice (1982)

Professional ratings
Review scores
Source	Rating
Allmusic	4/5 stars

Ella Loves Cole is a 1972 studio album by Ella Fitzgerald, arranged by Nelson Riddle, of songs written by Cole Porter.

This was Fitzgerald's first album of songs dedicated to a single composer since 1964's Ella Fitzgerald Sings the Johnny Mercer Song Book (also arranged by Riddle), and her second collection of songs by Porter, her first since 1956's Cole Porter songbook. She later recorded Ella Abraça Jobim, dedicated to Antônio Carlos Jobim. Fitzgerald and Riddle would collaborate again on her 1982 album The Best Is Yet to Come.

The album was re-released on Pablo as Dream Dancing in 1978, with the addition of two new tracks: "Dream Dancing" and "After You". Ella Loves Cole was remastered again in 2002, with colours added to the cover.

== Track listing ==
For the 1972 Atlantic LP release; Atlantic SD 1631.

Side One:

1. "I Get a Kick Out of You" – 4:21
2. "Down in the Depths (On the Ninetieth Floor)" – 3:40
3. "At Long Last Love" – 2:27
4. "I've Got You Under My Skin" – 3:17
5. "So Near and Yet So Far" – 2:21
6. "All of You" – 2:18
7. "Without Love" – 2:46

Side Two:

1. "My Heart Belongs to Daddy" – 2:33
2. "Love for Sale" – 4:36
3. "Just One of Those Things" – 3:53
4. "I Concentrate on You" – 4:06
5. "Anything Goes" – 2:51
6. "C'est Magnifique" – 2:27

All songs written by Cole Porter.

== Personnel ==
- Ella Fitzgerald - vocals
- Nelson Riddle - arranger
- Harry "Sweets" Edison - trumpet
- Keter Betts - double bass
- Ed Thigpen - drums
- Tommy Flanagan - piano
- Val Valentin - recording engineer
