= Sunshine of Your Love (album) =

Live album by Ella Fitzgerald
- Released: 1969
- Recorded: October 1968
- Genre: Jazz
- Length: 45:33
- Label: MPS
- Producer: Norman Granz

Ella Fitzgerald chronology
Misty Blue (1968)	Sunshine of Your Love (1969)	Ella (1969)

Alternative CD cover

Professional ratings
Review scores
Source	Rating
Allmusic	1.5/5 stars

Sunshine of Your Love is a 1969 live album by Ella Fitzgerald. Recorded at the Venetian Room, The Fairmont San Francisco, in October 1968. The main body of works performed here are contemporary pop songs from the late 1960s. Originally released on the German found jazz label MPS Records the album was re-issued on CD, with alternative artwork, in 1996 by Verve Records.

== Track listing ==
For the 1969 LP on MPS Records; MPS 15010; Re-issued by PolyGram-Verve in 1996 on CD, Verve 314 533 102-2

Side One:

1. "Hey Jude" (John Lennon, Paul McCartney) – 3:54
2. "Sunshine of Your Love" (Pete Brown, Jack Bruce, Eric Clapton) – 3:21
3. "This Girl's in Love With You" (Burt Bacharach, Hal David) – 4:30
4. "Watch What Happens" (Norman Gimbel, Michel Legrand) – 4:00
5. "Alright, Okay, You Win" (Mayme Watts, Sidney Wyche) – 3:51
6. "Give Me the Simple Life" (Rube Bloom, Harry Ruby) – 2:05

Side Two:

1. "Inútil Paisagem" ("Useless Landscape") (Antonio Carlos Jobim, Ray Gilbert, Aloysio Oliveira) – 5:13
2. "Old Devil Moon" (Yip Harburg, Burton Lane) – 4:21
3. "Don'cha Go 'Way Mad" (Illinois Jacquet, Jimmy Mundy, Al Stillman) – 3:37
4. "A House Is Not a Home" (Bacharach, David) – 4:14
5. "Trouble Is a Man" (Alec Wilder) – 4:14
6. "Love You Madly" (Duke Ellington) – 3:04

== Personnel ==
Tracks 1–6 Ernie Hecksher's Big Band

Track 7–12 Tommy Flanagan Trio

- Ella Fitzgerald – vocals
- Tommy Flanagan – piano, conductor
- Frank DeLaRosa – double bass
- Ed Thigpen – drums
- Marty Paich – arranger (Tracks 1, 2, 5)
- Frank De Vol – arranger (Track 3)
- Dee Carson – arranger (Track 4)
- Bill Holman – arranger (Track 6)
- Ernie Heckscher – bandleader
- Allen Smith (tracks 1–6) – trumpet
- Wally Heider – engineer
