= Ella à Nice =

Live album by Ella Fitzgerald
- Released: 1982
- Recorded: July 21, 1971
- Genre: Jazz
- Length: 50:14
- Label: Pablo
- Producer: Norman Granz

Ella Fitzgerald chronology
Ella Loves Cole (1972)	Ella à Nice (1982)	Jazz at Santa Monica Civic '72 (1972)

Professional ratings
Review scores
Source	Rating
Allmusic	3/5 stars

Ella à Nice is a 1982 album recorded live in 1971 by American jazz singer Ella Fitzgerald, accompanied by a jazz trio led by the pianist Tommy Flanagan. This recording remained unreleased until the early 1980s.

== Track listing ==
For the 1982 LP on Pablo Records; Pablo 2308 234; Re-issued by Pablo Records in 1990 on CD; OJC20 442-2

Side One:

1. "Night and Day" (Cole Porter) – 6:43
2. The Many Faces of Cole Porter: "Get Out of Town"/"You'd Be So Easy to Love", "You Do Something to Me" (Porter) – 5:22
3. The Ballad Medley: "Body and Soul", "The Man I Love", "I Loves You Porgy" (Frank Eyton, Johnny Green, Edward Heyman, Robert Sour)/(George Gershwin, Ira Gershwin)/(G. Gershwin, I. Gershwin) – 4:42
4. The Bossa Scene: "The Girl from Ipanema"/"Fly Me to the Moon"/"O Nosso Amor"/"Madalena"/"Agua de Beber" (Antonio Carlos Jobim, Norman Gimbel, Vinícius de Moraes)/(Bart Howard)/(Jobim, de Moraes)/(Jobim, Ronaldo Monteiro de Souza)/(Jobim, de Moraes) – 5:35
5. "Summertime" (G. Gershwin, I. Gershwin, DuBose Heyward) – 2:36

Side Two:

1. "They Can't Take That Away from Me" (G. Gershwin, I. Gershwin) – 4:14
2. Aspects of Duke: "Mood Indigo"/"Do Nothing till You Hear from Me"/"It Don't Mean a Thing (If It Ain't Got That Swing)" (Barney Bigard, Duke Ellington, Irving Mills)/(Ellington, Bob Russell)/(Ellington, Mills) – 7:16
3. "Something" (George Harrison) – 3:33
4. "St. Louis Blues" (W.C. Handy) – 2:59
5. "Close to You" (Burt Bacharach, Hal David) –2:45
6. "Put a Little Love in Your Heart" (Jackie DeShannon, Jimmy Holiday, Randy Myers) – 4:29

== Personnel ==
Recorded July 21, 1971, in Nice, France:

- Ella Fitzgerald - vocals
- Tommy Flanagan - piano
- Frank DeLaRosa - double bass
- Ed Thigpen - drums
