= Bernice Petkere =

- Born: August 11, 1901
- Origin: Chicago, Illinois, United States
- Died: January 7, 2000 (aged 98) Los Angeles, California, United States
- Genres: Popular music
- Occupation: Songwriter

Bernice Petkere (August 11, 1901 – January 7, 2000) was an American songwriter. She was dubbed the "Queen of Tin Pan Alley" by Irving Berlin.

== Biography ==
Born in Chicago, Illinois, United States, she began performing in vaudeville as a child. "Starlight (Help Me Find The One I Love)" (1931), her first published song, was recorded by Bing Crosby. She also wrote radio themes for CBS. Other notable songs include "Lullaby of the Leaves", "The Lady I Love", "Close Your Eyes" (1933), "My River Home", "By a Rippling Stream", "Stay Out of My Dreams", "A Mile a Minute" and "It's All So New to Me", which was featured in the Joan Crawford film The Ice Follies of 1939 (MGM, 1939).

Petkere was a member of ASCAP and the Writers Guild of America. Her songs have been recorded by Kurt Elling, Tony Bennett, Doris Day, Peggy Lee, Nancy Wilson, Ella Fitzgerald, Queen Latifah, Vic Damone, Betty Carter, Harry "Sweets" Edison and Eddie "Lockjaw" Davis (together, in an instrumental version), Herb Ellis and Remo Palmier (together, in an instrumental version), Harry Belafonte, The Ventures, and Kate Smith.

Petkere died in Los Angeles, California, at the age of 98.
