= The Stockholm Concert, 1966 =

1966 live album by Ella Fitzgerald

Live album by Ella Fitzgerald
- Released: 1984
- Recorded: February 7, 1966
- Genre: Jazz
- Length: 36:31
- Label: Pablo
- Producer: Norman Granz

Ella Fitzgerald chronology
Ella at Duke's Place (1965)	The Stockholm Concert, 1966 (1984)	Whisper Not (1967)

Duke Ellington chronology
A Concert of Sacred Music (1965)	The Stockholm Concert, 1966 (1966)	Ella and Duke at the Cote D'Azur (1966)

Professional ratings
Review scores
Source	Rating
AllMusic	4/5 stars

The Stockholm Concert, 1966 is a 1966 live album by the American jazz singer Ella Fitzgerald, accompanied in part by the Duke Ellington Orchestra. The recording remained unreleased until 1984.

It is notable as the last release of Ella's four recorded collaborations with Duke Ellington. Later in 1966 Ella and Duke went on to record their final album together, Ella and Duke at the Cote D'Azur.

== Track listing ==
Originally released in 1984 on LP and CD (Pablo 2308–242). Remastered reissue on CD in 1987 (Pablo PACD-2308-242-2 in the US; Pablo 025218024228 in France/Benelux).

1. "Imagine My Frustration" (Duke Ellington, Billy Strayhorn, Gerald Wilson) – 5:13
2. "Duke's Place" (Ellington, Bob Katz, Bob Thiele) – 4:43
3. "Satin Doll" (Ellington, Johnny Mercer, Strayhorn) – 3:08
4. "Something to Live For" (Ellington, Strayhorn) – 4:04
5. "Wives and Lovers" (Burt Bacharach, Hal David) – 2:11
6. "Só Danço Samba" ("Jazz 'n' Samba") (Antonio Carlos Jobim, Vinícius de Moraes, Norman Gimbel) – 4:14
7. "Let's Do It (Let's Fall in Love)" (Cole Porter) – 4:09
8. "Lover Man (Oh Where Can You Be?)" (Jimmy Davis, Ram Ramirez, Jimmy Sherman) – 4:50
9. "Cotton Tail" (Ellington) – 5:01

== Personnel ==
All tracks recorded on February 7, 1966, at the Stockholm Concert Hall, Sweden.

Ella Fitzgerald with Duke Ellington and His Orchestra on all tracks, but the orchestra's rhythm section (including Ellington) on tracks 3–8 is replaced by the Jimmy Jones Trio (on the cover referred to as "Ella's Trio").

- Duke Ellington – piano (exc. tracks 3–8), arranger, bandleader
- William "Cat" Anderson, Mercer Ellington, Herb Jones, Cootie Williams – trumpet
- Lawrence Brown, Buster Cooper – trombone
- Chuck Connors – bass trombone
- Johnny Hodges – alto saxophone
- Russell Procope – alto saxophone, clarinet
- Paul Gonsalves – tenor saxophone
- Harry Carney – baritone saxophone, clarinet, bass clarinet
- Jimmy Hamilton – clarinet, tenor saxophone
- John Lamb – double bass (exc. tracks 3–8)
- Sam Woodyard – drums (exc. tracks 3–8)
- The Jimmy Jones Trio featured on tracks 3–8
  - Jimmy Jones – piano
  - Joe Comfort – double bass
  - Gus Johnson – drums

== Credits ==
- Produced by Norman Granz
- Digitally remastering in 1987 by Joe Tarantino at Fantasy Studios, Berkeley, California.
