= Whisper Not (Ella Fitzgerald album) =

Studio album by Ella Fitzgerald
- Released: 1966
- Recorded: July 20, 1966
- Studio: United Western (Hollywood)
- Genre: Jazz
- Length: 46:48
- Label: Verve
- Producer: Norman Granz

Ella Fitzgerald chronology
The Stockholm Concert, 1966 (1984)	Whisper Not (1966)	Ella and Duke at the Cote D'Azur (1967)

Professional ratings
Review scores
Source	Rating
The Penguin Guide to Jazz Recordings	3/4 stars

Whisper Not is a 1966 studio album by American jazz singer Ella Fitzgerald with the Marty Paich Orchestra. She had previously recorded with Marty Paich and his more familiar Dek-tette on the 1957 album Ella Swings Lightly.

Whisper Not is Ella's penultimate recording for the Verve label. Her 11 years on the Verve label had seen her make her most acclaimed recordings, critically and commercially. The jazz critic Will Friedwald described her pre-Verve work on Decca as "seeming a mere prelude" and her "post-Verve years as an afterthought".

== Track listing ==
For the 1967 Verve LP release; Verve V6-4071; Re-issued in 2002 on CD, Verve 314 589 478-2

Side One
No.	Title	Writer(s)	Length
1.	"Sweet Georgia Brown"	Ben Bernie, Kenneth Casey, Maceo Pinkard	3:30
2.	"Whisper Not"	Benny Golson, Leonard Feather	2:59
3.	"I Said No"	Frank Loesser, Jule Styne	3:59
4.	"Thanks for the Memory"	Ralph Rainger, Leo Robin	3:59
5.	"Spring Can Really Hang You up the Most"	Fran Landesman, Tommy Wolf	3:46
6.	"Old MacDonald Had a Farm"	Traditional	2:16

Side Two
No.	Title	Writer(s)	Length
7.	"Time After Time"	Sammy Cahn, Jule Styne	3:26
8.	"You've Changed"	Carl T. Fischer, Bill Carey	3:15
9.	"I've Got Your Number"	Cy Coleman, Carolyn Leigh	3:11
10.	"Lover Man (Oh Where Can You Be?)"	Roger "Ram" Ramirez, Jimmy Davis, Jimmy Sherman	4:18
11.	"Wives and Lovers"	Burt Bacharach, Hal David	2:21
12.	"Matchmaker, Matchmaker" (From the musical Fiddler on the Roof)	Jerry Bock, Sheldon Harnick	2:45
Total length:			46:48

== Personnel ==
Recorded July 20, 1966 at United Western Recorders, Hollywood, Los Angeles:

- Val Valentin – Engineer

Tracks 3–6

- Ella Fitzgerald – Vocals
- Harry Edison – Trumpet
- Jimmy Rowles – Piano
- Chuck Berghofer – Bass
- Louie Bellson – Drums
- Marty Paich – Arranger, Conductor.

Tracks 1–2, 7–12

- Ella Fitzgerald – Vocals
- Stu Williamson – Trumpet
- Bill Perkins – Tenor Saxophone
- Jimmy Rowles – Piano
- Al Viola – Guitar
- Joe Mondragon – Bass
- Shelly Manne – Drums
- Marty Paich – Arranger, Conductor.
