= Sweet and Hot (album) =

Studio album by Ella Fitzgerald
- Released: 1955
- Recorded: 1952–1955
- Genre: Jazz
- Label: Decca

Ella Fitzgerald chronology
Miss Ella Fitzgerald & Mr Gordon Jenkins Invite You to Listen and Relax (1955)	Sweet and Hot (1955)	Ella Fitzgerald Sings the Cole Porter Songbook (1956)

Professional ratings
Review scores
Source	Rating
Allmusic	3/5 stars

Sweet and Hot is a 1955 studio album by Ella Fitzgerald, issued on the Decca Records label. The album features tracks recorded during the early 1950s, that had been previously issued on 78 rpm single. MCA Records re-issued the complete album on CD, in 1998, together with the 1955 album Lullabies of Birdland.

== Track listing ==
Side one
No.	Title	Writer(s)	Length
1.	"Thanks for the Memory"	Ralph Rainger, Leo Robin	2:28
2.	"It Might as Well Be Spring"	Richard Rodgers, Oscar Hammerstein II	2:42
3.	"You'll Never Know"	Harry Warren, Mack Gordon	3:09
4.	"I Can't Get Started"	Vernon Duke, Ira Gershwin	3:06
5.	"Moanin' Low"	Ralph Rainger, Howard Dietz	2:42
6.	"Taking a Chance on Love"	Vernon Duke, John Latouche, Ted Fetter	3:08

Side two
No.	Title	Writer(s)	Length
7.	"That Old Black Magic"	Harold Arlen, Johnny Mercer	2:30
8.	"Old Devil Moon"	Yip Harburg, Burton Lane	2:59
9.	"Lover, Come Back to Me"	Sigmund Romberg, Oscar Hammerstein II	2:01
10.	"Between the Devil and the Deep Blue Sea"	Harold Arlen, Ted Koehler	2:17
11.	"(If You Can't Sing It) You'll Have to Swing It (Mr. Paganini)"	Sam Coslow	5:08

== Personnel ==
- Ella Fitzgerald – vocals
- André Prévin and Orchestra – Track 1–4 (Recorded in 1955)
- John Scott Trotter and His Orchestra – Track 5–6 (Recorded in 1953)
- Benny Carter and band – Track 7–10 (Recorded in 1955)
- Sy Oliver and His Orchestra – Track 11 (Recorded in 1952)
