= Ella Swings Lightly =

Studio album by Ella Fitzgerald
- Released: 1958
- Recorded: November 22–23, 1958
- Genre: Jazz
- Length: 58:34
- Label: Verve
- Producer: Norman Granz

Ella Fitzgerald chronology
One O'Clock Jump (1957)	Ella Swings Lightly (1958)	Ella Fitzgerald Sings the Irving Berlin Songbook (1958)

Professional ratings
Review scores
Source	Rating
AllMusic	3/5 stars
The Penguin Guide to Jazz Recordings	4/4 stars

Ella Swings Lightly is a 1958 studio album by the American jazz singer Ella Fitzgerald, recorded with the Marty Paich Dek-tette. Ella also worked with Marty Paich on her 1967 album Whisper Not. The album features a typical selection of jazz standards from this era, songs from musicals like Frank Loesser's If I Were a Bell, and a famous jazz instrumental vocalised by Ella, Roy Eldridge's Little Jazz.

This album won Ella the 1960 Grammy award for the Best Improvised Jazz Solo.

== Track listing ==
For the 1958 Verve 2-LP album, Verve MG V-4021

Side One:

1. "Little White Lies" (Walter Donaldson) – 2:31
2. "You Hit the Spot" (Mack Gordon, Harry Revel) – 2:44
3. "What's Your Story, Morning Glory?" (Jack Lawrence, Paul Francis Webster, Mary Lou Williams) – 2:38
4. "Just You, Just Me" (Jesse Greer, Raymond Klages) – 2:19
5. "As Long as I Live" (Harold Arlen, Ted Koehler) – 2:48
6. "Teardrops from My Eyes" (Rudy Toombs) – 3:45
7. "Gotta Be This or That" (Sunny Skylar) – 3:05
8. "Moonlight on the Ganges" Sherman Myers, Chester Wallace) – 2:22

Side Two:

9. "My Kinda Love" (Louis Alter, Jo Trent) – 3:41
10. "Blues in the Night" (Harold Arlen, Johnny Mercer) – 3:39
11. "If I Were a Bell" (Frank Loesser) – 2:33
12. "You're an Old Smoothie" (Nacio Herb Brown, Buddy DeSylva, Richard A. Whiting) – 2:45
13. "Little Jazz" (Roy Eldridge, Buster Harding) – 3:02
14. "You Brought a New Kind of Love to Me" (Sammy Fain, Irving Kahal, Peter Norman) – 2:18
15. "Knock Me a Kiss" (Mike Jackson) – 4:06
16. "720 in the Books" (Harold Adamson, Jan Savitt, Leo Watson) – 2:52

Bonus Tracks; Issued on the Verve 1992 CD re-issue, Verve-PolyGram 314-5372582

17. "Oh, What a Night for Love" (Long Version) (Steve Allen, Neal Hefti) – 3:26
18. "Little Jazz" (Alternative take) – 3:01
19. "Dreams Are Made for Children" (Previously unreleased) (Mack David, Jerry Livingston, Max Meth) – 2:36
20. "Oh, What a Night for Love" (45 rpm 7-inch single version) – 2:24

== Personnel ==
Recorded on November 22–23, 1958, in Hollywood, Los Angeles:

Tracks 2–4, 6, 9–11 Radio Recorders, Hollywood, November 22, 1958, Marty Paich's Dek-Tette: Bud Shank (as) Bill Holman (ts) Med Flory (bari) Lou Levy (p) Joe Mondragon (b) Mel Lewis (d) Don Fagerquist, Al Porcino (tp) Bob Enevoldsen (vtb, ts) Vincent DeRosa (frh)

Tracks 1, 5, 7, 8, 12–20 Radio Recorders, Hollywood, November 23, 1958, Marty Paich's Dek-Tette: Bud Shank (as) Bill Holman (ts) Med Flory (bari) Lou Levy (p) Joe Mondragon (b) Mel Lewis (d) Don Fagerquist, Al Porcino (tp) Bob Enevoldsen (vtb, ts) Vincent DeRosa (frh)
