= Miss Ella Fitzgerald & Mr Gordon Jenkins Invite You to Listen and Relax =

Studio album by Ella Fitzgerald
- Released: 1958
- Recorded: April 27 & September 21, 1949, March 24, 1954
- Genres: Jazz, traditional pop
- Length: 44:33
- Label: Decca

Ella Fitzgerald chronology
For Sentimental Reasons (1955)	Miss Ella Fitzgerald & Mr Gordon Jenkins Invite You to Listen and Relax (1958)	Sweet and Hot (1955)

Miss Ella Fitzgerald & Mr Gordon Jenkins Invite You to Listen and Relax is a collection of material recorded by Ella Fitzgerald between 1949 and 1954, all tracks were arranged by Gordon Jenkins. All tracks were previously only available on 78 rpm singles. The album was compiled and released by Decca in 1958.

== Track listing ==
1. "I Wished on the Moon" (Dorothy Parker, Ralph Rainger) – 3:08
2. "Baby" (Robert Colby, Floyd Huddleston) – 2:44
3. "I Hadn't Anyone Till You" (Ray Noble) – 3:02
4. "A Man Wrote a Song" (Dave Franklin) – 3:11
5. "Who's Afraid (Not I, Not I, Not I)" (Doris Tauber, Jack Lawrence) – 2:45
6. "Happy Talk" (Richard Rodgers, Oscar Hammerstein II) – 2:25
7. "Black Coffee" (Paul Francis Webster, Sonny Burke) – 3:03
8. "Lover's Gold" (Morty Nevins, Bob Merrill) – 3:04
9. "I'm Gonna Wash That Man Right Outa My Hair" (Rodgers, Hammerstein) – 2:53
10. "Dream a Little Longer" (Donald Kahn) – 2:59
11. "I Need" (Ralph Care, Sol Marcus) – 2:40
12. "Foolish Tears" (Jenny Lou Carson) – 2:57

== Personnel ==
=== Performance ===
- Ella Fitzgerald – vocal
- Gordon Jenkins – arranger
