= 30 by Ella =

Studio album by Ella Fitzgerald
- Released: 1968
- Recorded: May 28–June 3, 1968
- Genre: Jazz
- Length: 54:31
- Label: Capitol
- Producer: Dave Dexter, Jr.

Ella Fitzgerald chronology
Ella Fitzgerald's Christmas (1967)	30 by Ella (1968)	Misty Blue (1968)

Professional ratings
Review scores
Source	Rating
Allmusic	3/5 stars
The Rolling Stone Jazz Record Guide	3/5 stars

30 by Ella is a 1968 studio album by the American jazz singer Ella Fitzgerald.

The album's unusual construction of six medleys of songs were arranged by Benny Carter. This album was Fitzgerald's final recording made for Capitol Records. The following album release on Capitol from Fitzgerald, Misty Blue had been recorded in late 1967.

== Track listing ==
For the 1968 LP on Capitol Records; Capitol ST 2960; Re-issued in 2000 on CD, Capitol 7243 5 20090 2 2

No.	Title	Writer(s)	Length
1.	"My Mother's Eyes; Try a Little Tenderness; I Got It Bad (and That Ain't Good); Everything I Have Is Yours; I Never Knew (I Could Love Anybody Like I'm Loving You); Goodnight My Love"	L. Wolfe Gilbert, Abel Baer; Harry M. Woods, Jimmy Campbell and Reg Connelly; Paul Francis Webster, Duke Ellington; Harold Adamson, Burton Lane; Tom Pitts, Raymond B. Egan, Roy Marsh, Paul Whiteman; Mack Gordon, Harry Revel	12:21
2.	"Four or Five Times; Maybe; Taking a Chance on Love; Elmer's Tune; At Sundown; It's a Wonderful World"	Mares H. Hellman, Byron Gay, Allen Flynn, Frank Madden; Vernon Duke, John La Touche, Ted Fetter; Elmer Albrecht, Sammy Gallop, Dick Jurgens; Walter Donaldson; Adamson, Jan Savitt, Johnny Watson	6:18
3.	"On Green Dolphin Street; How Am I To Know; Just Friends; I Cried for You; Seems Like Old Times; You Stepped Out of a Dream"	Ned Washington, Bronislau Kaper; Dorothy Parker, Jack King; Sam M. Lewis, John Klenner; Arthur Freed, Gus Arnheim, Abe Lyman; Carmen Lombardo, John Jacob Loeb; Nacio Herb Brown, Gus Kahn	7:05
4.	"If I Give My Heart to You; Once in a While; Ebb Tide; The Lamp Is Low; Where Are You? Thinking of You (I've Grown So Lonesome)"	Jimmie Crane, Jimmy Brewster, Al Jacobs; Bud Green, Michael Edwards; Carl Sigman, Robert Maxwell; Mitchell Parish, Peter DeRose, Bert Shefter; Adamson, Jimmy McHugh; Donaldson, Paul Ash	11:08
5.	"Candy; All I Do Is Dream of You; Spring is Here; 720 In the Books; It Happened in Monterey; What Can I Say After I Say I'm Sorry?"	Mack David, Joan Whitney Kramer, Alex Kramer; Freed, Nacio Herb Brown; Richard Rodgers, Lorenz Hart; Adamson, Savitt, Johnny Watson; Billy Rose, Mabel Wayne; Donaldson, Abe Lyman	6:14
6.	"No Regrets; I've Got a Feeling You're Fooling; Don't Blame Me; Deep Purple; Rain; You're a Sweetheart"	Harry Tobias, Roy Ingraham; Freed, Brown; Dorothy Fields, McHugh; Mitchell Parish, Peter DeRose; Eugene Ford; Adamson, McHugh	9:47
7.	"Hawaiian War Chant" (Note: CD bonus track only, not on the original release.)	Ralph Freed, Leleiohaku, Ray Noble	2:18

== Personnel ==
- Ella Fitzgerald – vocals
- Jimmy Jones – piano
- Harry "Sweets" Edison – trumpet
- Georgie Auld – tenor saxophone
- John Collins – guitar
- Panama Francis – drums (tracks 3 & 6)
- Louie Bellson - drums (tracks 1, 2, 4, 5 & 7)
- Bob West – bass
