= Lullabies of Birdland =

Studio album by Ella Fitzgerald
- Released: 1955
- Recorded: 1945–1955
- Genre: Jazz
- Length: 34:53
- Label: Decca

Ella Fitzgerald chronology
Songs in a Mellow Mood (1954)	Lullabies of Birdland (1955)	For Sentimental Reasons (1955)

Professional ratings
Review scores
Source	Rating
Allmusic	4.5/5 stars

Lullabies of Birdland is a 1955 studio album by Ella Fitzgerald, issued on the Decca Records label. The album features tracks recorded during the late 1940s and early 1950s, that had been previously issued on 78 rpm single. MCA Records re-issued the complete album on CD, in 1998, together with the 1955 album Sweet and Hot.

== Track listing ==
Side one:

1. "Lullaby of Birdland" (George Shearing, George David Weiss) – 2:51
2. "Rough Ridin'" (Ella Fitzgerald, Hank Jones, Bill Tennyson) – 3:14
3. "Angel Eyes" (Earl Brent, Matt Dennis) – 2:54
4. "Smooth Sailing" (Arnett Cobb) – 3:06
5. "Oh, Lady Be Good!" (George Gershwin, Ira Gershwin) – 3:08
6. "Later" (Tiny Bradshaw, Henry Glover) – 2:32

Side two:

1. "Ella Hums the Blues (From Pete Kelly's Blues)" (Fitzgerald) – 5:13
2. "How High the Moon" (Nancy Hamilton, Morgan Lewis) – 3:15
3. "Basin Street Blues" (Spencer Williams) – 3:07
4. "Air Mail Special" (Charlie Christian, Benny Goodman, Jimmy Mundy) – 3:02
5. "Flying Home" (Goodman, Lionel Hampton, Sid Robin) – 2:27

== Personnel ==
- Ella Fitzgerald - vocals
- Sy Oliver and His Orchestra - Tracks 1,3,6,9. (Recorded 1949, 1952, and 1954)
- Ray Brown and His Trio (plus Bill Doggett on organ) - Tracks 2 and 10. (Recorded 1952)
- Hank Jones and His Quartet (plus Bill Doggett on organ) - Track 4. (Recorded 1951)
- Bob Haggart and His Orchestra - Track 5. (Recorded 1947)
- Don Abney (piano), Joe Mondragon (bass), Larry Bunker (drums) - Track 7. (Recorded 1955)
- Unknown orchestra, but including Leonard Graham AKA Idrees Sulieman (trumpet), and Ray Brown (bass) - Track 8. (Recorded 1947)
- Vic Schoen and His Orchestra - Track 11. (Recorded 1945)
