= These Are the Blues =

These are the Blues

Studio album by Ella Fitzgerald
- Released: 1963
- Recorded: October 28–29, 1963
- Studio: A & R (New York)
- Genre: Jazz, blues
- Length: 41:34
- Label: Verve
- Producer: Norman Granz

Ella Fitzgerald chronology
Ella and Basie! (1963)	These are the Blues (1963)	Hello, Dolly! (1964)

Professional ratings
Review scores
Source	Rating
AllMusic	3/5 stars
The Penguin Guide to Jazz Recordings	3/4 stars

These are the Blues is a 1963 studio album by the American jazz singer Ella Fitzgerald featuring trumpeter Roy Eldridge and organist Wild Bill Davis. Sleeve artwork was painted by David Stone Martin. This is Fitzgerald's only example of recording an entire album of blues songs.

== Track listing ==
For the 1963 Verve LP release; Verve V6-4060; Re-issued in 1990 on CD, Verve 829 536–2

Side One:

1. "Jailhouse Blues" (Bessie Smith, Clarence Williams) – 5:25
2. "In the Evening (When the Sun Goes Down)" (Leroy Carr, Don Raye) – 4:27
3. "See See Rider" (Ma Rainey) – 2:39
4. "You Don't Know My Mind" (Gray, Virginia Liston, Williams) – 4:49
5. "Trouble in Mind" (Richard M. Jones) – 3:31

Side Two:

1. "How Long, How Long Blues" (Leroy Carr) – 3:57
2. "Cherry Red" (Pete Johnson, Big Joe Turner) – 4:09
3. "Downhearted Blues" (Lovie Austin, Alberta Hunter) – 3:08
4. "St. Louis Blues" (W. C. Handy) – 6:28
5. "Hear Me Talkin' to Ya" (Louis Armstrong) – 3:01

== Personnel ==
- Ella Fitzgerald – vocals
- Roy Eldridge – trumpet
- Wild Bill Davis – electronic organ
- Herb Ellis – guitar
- Ray Brown – double bass
- Gus Johnson – drums
