= Ross Gorman =

American jazz bandleader and multi-instrumentalist (1890-1953)

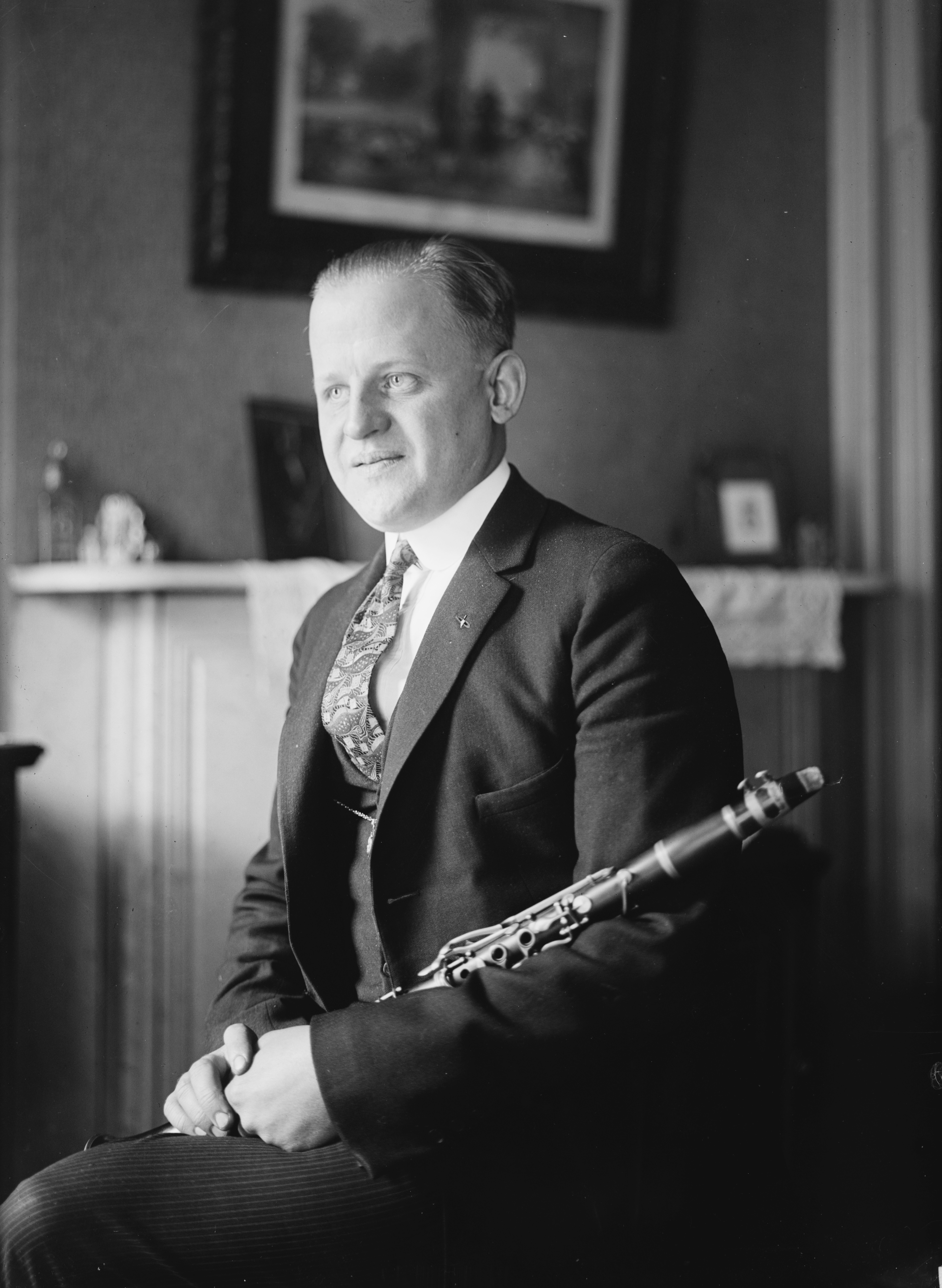

Background information
- Born: John Ross Smeed Gorman; November 18, 1890; Paterson, New Jersey, U.S.
- Died: February 27, 1953 (aged 62)
- Genres: Jazz
- Instruments: Clarinet

John Ross Smeed Gorman (November 18, 1890 – February 27, 1953) was an American jazz clarinetist, bandleader, and multi-instrumentalist. Gorman is best remembered for his work with Paul Whiteman, particularly his famous clarinet glissando for Rhapsody in Blue, on which he also played oboe, bass clarinet, and saxophone. The glissando came as the result of an experiment by Gorman, who, according to Whiteman's violinist Kurt Dieterlie, was known for his ability to "make incredibly odd sounds with his instrument."

== Career ==
In addition to his work with Whiteman, he also had his own band, which performed under various names such as "The Virginians", "Ross Gorman and his Orchestra," "Ross Gorman and his Fire-Eaters," and "Gorman's Novelty Syncopators." For recording purposes, this band included several Whiteman regulars such as Red Nichols, Miff Mole, and Jimmy Dorsey; they also recorded with Eddie Lang. He is credited as a composer on various popular songs of the 1920s, including "Some Lonesome Night" and "Rose of the Rio Grande" (later recorded by Duke Ellington).

His glissando was not his only innovation; the jazz writer Stuart Nicholson has argued that Gorman's experiments with the whole-tone scale on his song "Rhythm of the Day" "anticipated Fletcher Henderson's 'Queer Notions' by about eight years."
