= Ella in Budapest =

Live album by Ella Fitzgerald
- Released: 1999
- Recorded: May 20, 1970
- Genre: Jazz
- Length: 78:17
- Label: Pablo
- Producer: Norman Granz

Ella Fitzgerald chronology
| Things Ain't What They Used to Be (And You Better Believe It) (1970) | Ella in Budapest (1999) | Ella Loves Cole (1972) |

Professional ratings
Review scores
| Source | Rating |
|---|---|
| AllMusic | 4/5 stars |
| The Penguin Guide to Jazz Recordings | 2.5/4 stars |

Ella in Budapest is a live album recorded in 1970 by Ella Fitzgerald, accompanied by the Tommy Flanagan trio, sound engineering by Jozsef Dudas. The album remained unreleased until 1999 when it was issued by Pablo Records.

== Track listing ==
For the 1999 Pablo Records CD release; PACD 5308-2

1. "Crazy Rhythm" (Irving Caesar, Joseph Meyer, Roger Kahn) - 3:16
2. Medley: "This Girl's in Love with You"/"I'm Gonna Sit Right Down and Write Myself a Letter" (Burt Bacharach, Hal David)/(Joe Young, Fred E. Ahlert) - 4:57
3. "Open Your Window" (Harry Nilsson) - 4:16
4. "Satin Doll" (Duke Ellington, Billy Strayhorn, Johnny Mercer) - 2:39
5. "Spinning Wheel" (David Clayton-Thomas) - 3:41
6. "As Time Goes By" (Herman Hupfeld) - 3:27
7. "You'd Better Love Me" (Hugh Martin, Timonthy Gray) - 2:01
8. "I'll Never Fall in Love Again" (Bacharach, David) - 2:44
9. "Hello, Young Lovers" (Richard Rodgers, Oscar Hammerstein II) - 4:05
10. Medley: "I Concentrate on You"/"You Go to My Head" (J. Fred Coots, Haven Gillespie)/(Cole Porter) - 5:12
11. "The Girl from Ipanema" (Antônio Carlos Jobim, Vinícius de Moraes, Norman Gimbel) - 6:33
12. "Cabaret" (John Kander, Fred Ebb) - 3:18
13. "Dancing in the Dark" (Arthur Schwartz, Howard Dietz) - 3:12
14. "Raindrops Keep Fallin' on My Head" (Bacharach, David) - 5:33
15. "The Lady Is a Tramp" (Rodgers, Lorenz Hart) - 3:01
16. "Summertime" (George Gershwin, DuBose Heyward) - 2:56
17. "(If You Can't Sing It) You'll Have to Swing It (Mr. Paganini)" (Sam Coslow) - 4:11
18. "Mack the Knife" (Kurt Weill, Bertolt Brecht, Marc Blitzstein) - 7:40
19. "People" (Jule Styne, Bob Merrill) - 3:22

== Personnel ==
Recorded June 20, 1970, in Budapest, Hungary:

- Ella Fitzgerald - vocals
- Tommy Flanagan - piano
- Frank DeLaRosa - double bass
- Ed Thigpen - drums
