= For Sentimental Reasons (Nat King Cole album) =

For Sentimental Reasons: 25 Early Vocal Classics

Compilation album by Nat King Cole
- Released: April 22, 1997
- Recorded: Mar 16, 1941–Dec 19, 1946
- Genres: Vocal jazz, pop
- Length: 75:16
- Label: ASV

Professional ratings
Review scores
Source	Rating
AllMusic	3.5/5 stars

For Sentimental Reasons: 25 Early Vocal Classics (or simply For Sentimental Reasons) is one of a number of albums released on the ASV/Living Era label, featuring recording artists mostly from the 1940s and 1950s, named for one of the major hits by the artist in question. This compact disc features recordings made by Nat King Cole between 1941 and 1946, at the beginning of Cole's career.

== Track listing ==
1. "For Sentimental Reasons" (William Best, Deek Watson) – 2:53
2. "This Will Make You Laugh" (Higginbotham) – 3:15
3. "That Ain't Right" (Nat King Cole) – 3:14
4. "Beautiful Moons Ago" (Cole, Moore) – 2:22
5. "I'm Lost" – 3:12
6. "Straighten Up and Fly Right" (Nat King Cole, Irving Mills) – 2:23
7. "Gee, Baby, Ain't I Good to You" (Razaf, Redman) – 2:54
8. "Sweet Lorraine" (Cliff Burwell, Mitchell Parish) – 3:09
9. "Embraceable You" (George Gershwin, Ira Gershwin) – 3:20
10. "It's Only a Paper Moon" (Billy Rose, E. Y. Harburg, Harold Arlen) – 2:52
11. "Look What You've Done to Me" (Conrad, Gottlier, Mitchell) – 2:56
12. "I Realize Now" (Cowen, Mille) – 3:00
13. "Don't Blame Me " (Jimmy McHugh, Dorothy Fields) – 3:23
14. "I'm Thru' with Love" (Kahn, Livingston, Malneck) – 2:54
15. "It Only Happens Once" (Laine) – 2:54
16. "It is Better to Be by Yourself" (Cole) – 2:48
17. "I'm in the Mood for Love" (Jimmy McHugh, Dorothy Fields) – 3:10
18. "I Don't Know Why-I Just Do" (Fred E. Ahlert, Roy Turk) – 3:10
19. "Get Your Kicks on Route 66!" (Bobby Troup) – 3:00
20. "What Can I Say After I Say I'm Sorry" (Walter Donaldson, Abe Lyman) – 3:01
21. "But She's My Buddy's Chick" (Atkinson, Oliver) – 3:02
22. "You Call It Madness, But I Call It Love" (Columbo, Conrad, Dubois) – 3:02
23. "I Want to Thank Your Folks" (Benjamin, Weiss) – 3:09
24. "You Don't Learn That in School" (Alfred, Fisher) – 3:03
25. "The Christmas Song (Merry Christmas to You)" (Mel Tormé, Bob Wells) – 3:10
