= Smooth Sailing (Ella Fitzgerald song) =

Single by Ella Fitzgerald

from the album Lullabies of Birdland
- B-side: "Love You Madly"
- Released: 1951
- Label: Decca
- Songwriter: Arnett Cobb

Audio
- "Smooth Sailing" on YouTube

"Smooth Sailing" is a scat song written by Arnett Cobb that was a hit in 1951 for Ella Fitzgerald, who recorded it for Decca with The Ray Charles Singers.

== Background ==
The song peaked at number three on Billboard's Most Played Juke Box, Rhythm & Blues Records chart.

According to Joel Whitburn, it is "one of Fitzgerald's most popular scat-singing performances" of all time. Steve Bergsman writes in his book What a Difference a Day Makes: Women Who Conquered 1950s Music that the song has "pedigree written all over it." The song's "melodic line grows into arabesques of instrumental precision and agility," describes The Ella Fitzgerald Companion..

Stuart Nicholson in his book Ella Fitzgerald: A Biography of the First Lady of Jazz notes that the "virtuoso scat performance" was "less frantic than its predecessors" and that it "contain[ed] the early feel of the emerging hard-bop movement." "This is safe, user-friendly scat over an engaging down-home feeling, and it clicked with the public," narrates the jazz historian.

== Charts ==
Chart (1951)	Peak position
US Billboard Most Played Juke Box, Rhythm & Blues Records	3
