= Montreux '77 (Ella Fitzgerald album) =

Live album by Ella Fitzgerald
- Released: 1977
- Recorded: July 14, 1977
- Genre: Jazz
- Length: 38:37
- Label: Pablo
- Producer: Norman Granz

Ella Fitzgerald chronology
Fitzgerald and Pass... Again (1976)	Montreux '77 (1977)	Lady Time (1978)

Professional ratings
Review scores
Source	Rating
AllMusic	2.5/5 stars

Montreux '77 is a 1977 live album by the American jazz singer Ella Fitzgerald, accompanied by a trio led by the pianist Tommy Flanagan. This is one of four albums that Ella recorded at the Montreux Jazz Festival, being Ella's second Montreux appearance to be released on record.

== Track listing ==
1. "Too Close for Comfort" (Jerry Bock, Larry Holofcener, George David Weiss) – 3:27
2. "I Ain't Got Nothin' But the Blues" (Duke Ellington, Don George) – 4:07
3. "My Man" (Jacques Charles, Channing Pollock, Albert Willemetz, Maurice Yvain) – 3:48
4. "Come Rain or Come Shine" (Harold Arlen, Johnny Mercer) – 2:30
5. "Day by Day" (Sammy Cahn, Axel Stordahl, Paul Weston) – 1:46
6. "Ordinary Fool" (Paul Williams) – 3:20
7. "One Note Samba" (Jon Hendricks, Antônio Carlos Jobim, Newton Mendonça) – 6:26
8. "I Let a Song Go Out of My Heart" (Ellington, Irving Mills, Henry Nemo, John Redmond) – 4:31
9. "Billie's Bounce" (Charlie Parker) – 4:49
10. "You Are the Sunshine of My Life" (Stevie Wonder) – 3:53

== Personnel ==
Recorded July 14, 1977, in Montreux, Switzerland:

- Ella Fitzgerald - Vocals

Tommy Flanagan Trio:

- Tommy Flanagan - Piano
- Keter Betts - Bass
- Bobby Durham - Drums
