= Ella Wishes You a Swinging Christmas =

Studio album by Ella Fitzgerald
- Released: 1960
- Recorded: July 15 – August 5, 1960
- Genre: Vocal jazz; Christmas
- Length: 34:00 (original 1960 release); 52:14 (2002 CD release)
- Label: Verve
- Producer: Norman Granz

Ella Fitzgerald chronology
Ella Fitzgerald Sings the George and Ira Gershwin Song Book (1959)	Ella Wishes You a Swinging Christmas (1960)	Ella Fitzgerald Sings Songs from the Soundtrack of "Let No Man Write My Epitaph" (1960)

Professional ratings
Review scores
Source	Rating
AllMusic	4.5/5 stars
Encyclopedia of Popular Music	4/5 stars
The Penguin Guide to Jazz Recordings	3.5/4 stars

Ella Wishes You a Swinging Christmas is a 1960 album by the American jazz singer Ella Fitzgerald with a studio orchestra arranged and conducted by Frank DeVol. The tracks consist of secular holiday songs, in contrast to her 1967 Christmas album.

It is Fitzgerald's only complete Verve album of Christmas tunes. Verve had issued a 7-inch 45 rpm single in 1959, featuring "The Christmas Song" with "The Secret of Christmas" on the B-side; both were recorded with Russ Garcia and His Orchestra in September 1959. The album has been reissued several times with variations to the cover artwork.

== Track listing ==
=== Original 1960 vinyl issue ===
Side One
No.	Title	Writer(s)	Length
1.	"Jingle Bells"	J.S. Pierpont	2:21
2.	"Santa Claus Is Coming to Town"	J. Fred Coots; Haven Gillespie	2:56
3.	"Have Yourself a Merry Little Christmas"	Hugh Martin; Ralph Blane	2:56
4.	"What Are You Doing New Year's Eve?"	Frank Loesser	3:32
5.	"Sleigh Ride"	Leroy Anderson; Mitchell Parish	2:56
6.	"The Christmas Song"	Mel Tormé; Bob Wells	3:00

Side two
No.	Title	Writer(s)	Length
7.	"Good Morning Blues"	Count Basie; Eddie Durham; Jimmy Rushing	3:15
8.	"Let It Snow! Let It Snow! Let It Snow!"	Sammy Cahn; Jule Styne	2:43
9.	"Winter Wonderland"	Felix Bernard; Richard B. Smith	2:16
10.	"Rudolph the Red-Nosed Reindeer"	Johnny Marks	2:51
11.	"Frosty the Snowman"	Steve Nelson; Jack Rollins	2:12
12.	"White Christmas"	Irving Berlin	3:02
Total length:			34:00

=== 2002 CD release ===
Bonus tracks
No.	Title	Writer(s)	Notes	Length
13.	"The Secret of Christmas"	Jimmy Van Heusen; Sammy Cahn	Released in 1959, 7" single, B-side	2:45
14.	"Medley: We Three Kings of Orient Are/O Little Town of Bethlehem"	John Henry Hopkins/: Phillips Brooks; Lewis Redner	Released in UK 1960, 7" single, A-side	3:35
15.	"Christmas Island"	Lyle L. Moraine	Released in UK 1960, 7" single, B-side	2:18
16.	"The Christmas Song" (alternate take)	Mel Tormé; Bob Wells		3:41
17.	"White Christmas" (alternate take)	Irving Berlin		3:44
18.	"Frosty the Snowman" (alternate take)	Steve Nelson; Jack Rollins		2:11
Total length:				52:14

== Personnel ==
Recorded July 15–16, August 5, 1960, New York, New York:

Track 13 recorded September 3, 1959, United Records, Hollywood:

- Ella Fitzgerald: Vocals
- Frank DeVol: Arranger, Conductor
- Russ Garcia and His Orchestra (track 13): Arranger, Conductor

== Charts ==
Chart performance for Ella Wishes You a Swinging Christmas
Chart (2019–2026)	Peak position
Austrian Albums (Ö3 Austria)	26
Belgian Albums (Ultratop Flanders)	55
Belgian Albums (Ultratop Wallonia)	111
Canadian Albums (Billboard)	30
Danish Albums (Hitlisten)	24
Dutch Albums (Album Top 100)	37
French Jazz Albums (SNEP)	5
German Albums (Offizielle Top 100)	47
Hungarian Albums (MAHASZ)	38
Irish Albums (OCC)	46
Lithuanian Albums (AGATA)	33
Norwegian Albums (VG-lista)	33
Portuguese Albums (AFP)	95
Swedish Albums (Sverigetopplistan)	33
Swedish Jazz Albums (Sverigetopplistan)	1
Swiss Albums (Schweizer Hitparade)	23
UK Albums (OCC)	44
US Billboard 200	45

== Certifications ==
Certifications for Ella Wishes You a Swinging Christmas
Region	Certification	Certified units/sales
United Kingdom (BPI)	Silver	60,000^{‡}
^{‡} Sales+streaming figures based on certification alone.
