= Ella at Juan-Les-Pins =

Ella at Juan-les-Pins

Live album by Ella Fitzgerald
- Released: 1964
- Recorded: July 28–29, 1964
- Genre: Jazz
- Length: 46:48
- Label: Verve
- Producer: Norman Granz

Ella Fitzgerald chronology
Ella Fitzgerald Sings the Johnny Mercer Song Book (1964)	Ella at Juan-les-Pins (1964)	Ella in Japan: 'S Wonderful (2011)

Professional ratings
Review scores
Source	Rating
AllMusic	4/5 stars
Encyclopedia of Popular Music	4/5 stars

Ella at Juan-les-Pins is a 1964 live album by Ella Fitzgerald, accompanied by a quartet led by Roy Eldridge on trumpet with the pianist Tommy Flanagan, Gus Johnson on drums and Bill Yancey on bass. Val Valentin was the recording engineer, cover photo by Jean-Pierre Leloir. The original 1964 album featured 12 songs, highlights of two concerts Fitzgerald performed on the 28 and 29 of July 1964 at the fifth annual Festival Mondial du Jazz Antibes in Juan-les-Pins, France. In 2002 Verve re-issued this album, including all the performances from both evenings.

== Track listing ==
For the 1964 LP on Verve Records; Verve V-4065

Side One:

1. "Day In, Day Out" (Rube Bloom, Johnny Mercer) – 2:48
2. "Just A-Sittin' and A-Rockin'" (Duke Ellington, Lee Gaines, Billy Strayhorn) – 4:03
3. "The Lady Is a Tramp" (Richard Rodgers, Lorenz Hart) – 4:20
4. "Summertime" (George Gershwin, Ira Gershwin, Dubose Heyward) – 2:36
5. "St. Louis Blues" (WC Handy) – 6:09
6. "Honeysuckle Rose" (Andy Razaf, Fats Waller) – 4:33

Side Two:

1. "They Can't Take That Away from Me" (G. Gershwin, I. Gershwin) – 2:32
2. "You'd Be So Nice to Come Home To" (Cole Porter) – 2:46
3. "Somewhere in the Night" (Mack Gordon, Josef Myrow) – 1:40
4. "I've Got You Under My Skin" (Porter) – 3:00
5. "The Cricket Song" (Fitzgerald) – 1:53
6. "How High the Moon" (Nancy Hamilton, Morgan Lewis) – 3:51

For the 2002 Verve 2CD re-issue, Verve 589 656-2

Disc One:

1. Introduction (in French) – 0:40 (First concert recorded 28 July 1964)
2. "Hello, Dolly!" (Jerry Herman) – 2:06
3. "Day In, Day Out" (Rube Bloom, Johnny Mercer) – 2:53
4. "Just A-Sittin' and A-Rockin'" (Duke Ellington, Lee Gaines, Billy Strayhorn) – 4:13
5. "I Love Being Here With You" (Peggy Lee, Bill Schluger) – 3:31
6. "People" (Bob Merrill, Jule Styne) – 4:25
7. "Someone to Watch Over Me" (George Gershwin, Ira Gershwin) – 3:42
8. "Can't Buy Me Love" (John Lennon, Paul McCartney) – 2:50
9. "Them There Eyes" (Maceo Pinkard, Doris Tauber, William Tracey) – 2:34
10. "The Lady Is a Tramp" (Richard Rodgers, Lorenz Hart) – 4:38
11. "Summertime" (G. Gershwin, I. Gershwin, Dubose Heyward) – 2:49
12. "Cutie Pants" (Steve Allen, Ray Brown) – 1:38
13. "I'm Putting all My Eggs in One Basket" (Irving Berlin) – 2:35
14. "St. Louis Blues" (WC Handy) – 5:45
15. "Perdido" (Ervin Drake, H.J Lengsfelder, Juan Tizol) – 7:15
16. "A-Tisket, A-Tasket" (Van Alexander, Ella Fitzgerald) – 0:53
17. "Mack the Knife" (Marc Blitzstein, Bertolt Brecht, Kurt Weill) – 3:43
18. "A-Tisket, A-Tasket" – 1:29
19. "Honeysuckle Rose" (Andy Razaf, Fats Waller) – 5:06
20. Introduction – 1:10 (Second concert recorded 29 July 1964)
21. "Hello, Dolly!" – 2:17
22. "Day In, Day Out" – 2:47
23. "Just A-Sittin' and A-Rockin'" – 3:59
24. "I Love Being Here With You" – 3:24

Disc Two:

1. "People" – 3:59
2. "Someone to Watch Over Me" – 3:41
3. "Can't Buy Me Love" – 2:57
4. "Them There Eyes" – 2:33
5. "The Lady Is a Tramp" – 4:44
6. "Summertime" – 3:07
7. "Cutie Pants" – 1:40
8. "I'm Putting All My Eggs in One Basket" – 2:37
9. "St. Louis Blues" – 7:00
10. "Perdido" – 7:07
11. "A-Tisket, A-Tasket" – 1:20
12. "Goody Goody" (Matty Malneck, Mercer) – 1:52
13. "The Girl from Ipanema" (Vinícius de Moraes, Norman Gimbel, Antonio Carlos Jobim) – 2:41
14. "They Can't Take That Away from Me" (G. Gershwin, I. Gershwin) – 2:37
15. "You'd Be So Nice to Come Home To" (Cole Porter) – 2:52
16. "Shiny Stockings" (Fitzgerald, Frank Foster) – 3:20
17. "Somewhere in the Night" (Mack Gordon, Josef Myrow) – 2:23
18. "I've Got You Under My Skin" (Porter) – 3:12
19. "Blues in the Night" (Harold Arlen, Mercer) – 4:04
20. "Too Close for Comfort" (Jerry Bock, Larry Holofcener, George David Weiss) – 2:23
21. "Mack the Knife" – 3:34
22. "When Lights Are Low"/"A-Tisket, A-Tasket" (Benny Carter, Alan Feldman, Spencer Williams) – 1:48
23. "The Cricket Song" (Fitzgerald) – 2:22
24. "How High the Moon" (Nancy Hamilton, Morgan Lewis) – 3:57
25. "A-Tisket, A-Tasket"/"When Lights Are Low" – 0:57

== Personnel ==
- Ella Fitzgerald – vocals
- Roy Eldridge – trumpet
- Tommy Flanagan – piano
- Bill Yancey – double bass
- Gus Johnson – drums
