= Azure (song) =

1937 song by Duke Ellington and Irving Mills

"Azure" is a 1937 song composed by Duke Ellington with lyrics by Irving Mills. The composition is an example of Ellington's early use of bi- and polytonality, and some parts of it are almost atonal in nature.

== Notable recordings ==
- Ella Fitzgerald - Ella Fitzgerald Sings the Duke Ellington Songbook (1957) "Ella at Duke's Place" (1965)
- Earl Grant - Midnight Sun (1962)
- Cecil Taylor - Jazz Advance (1956)
- Tony Bennett - "Bennett Sings Ellington: Hot & Cool" (1999)

== See also ==
- List of 1930s jazz standards
