= Things Ain't What They Used to Be (And You Better Believe It) =

Studio album by Ella Fitzgerald
- Released: 1970
- Recorded: May 26–30, 1969
- Genre: Jazz
- Length: 34:06
- Label: Reprise
- Producer: Norman Granz

Ella Fitzgerald chronology
Ella (1969)	Things Ain't What They Used to Be (1970)	Ella in Budapest, Hungary (1999)

Professional ratings
Review scores
Source	Rating
Allmusic	4.5/5 stars
The Rolling Stone Jazz Record Guide	3/5 stars

Things Ain't What They Used to Be is a 1970 studio album by the American jazz singer Ella Fitzgerald - the final album that Fitzgerald recorded on the Reprise Records label. The album was re-issued on CD with alternative artwork in 1989. It was released together on one CD with Ella's first album recorded for Reprise label, Ella.

== Track listing ==
For the 1970 LP on Reprise Records; RS 6432; Re-issued by Reprise-Warner Bros. in 1989 on CD; Reprise 9 26023-2

Side One:

1. "Sunny" (Bobby Hebb) – 5:18
2. "Mas que Nada" (Jorge Ben Jor, English Lyrics by Loryn Deane) – 3:49
3. "A Man and a Woman (Un Homme et une Femme)" (Pierre Barouh, Francis Lai, Jerry Keller) – 3:17
4. "Days of Wine and Roses" (Henry Mancini, Johnny Mercer) – 2:22
5. "Black Coffee" (Sonny Burke, Paul Francis Webster) – 4:28
6. "Tuxedo Junction" (Julian Dash, Buddy Feyne, Erskine Hawkins, Bill Johnson) – 3:17

Side Two:

1. "I Heard It Through the Grapevine" (Barrett Strong, Norman Whitfield) – 3:44
2. "Don't Dream of Anybody But Me" (AKA "Li'l Darlin'") (Neal Hefti, Bart Howard) – 4:06
3. "Things Ain't What They Used to Be" (Mercer Ellington, Ted Persons) – 3:11
4. "Willow Weep for Me" (Ann Ronell) – 4:40
5. "Manteca" (Dizzy Gillespie, Gil Fuller, Chano Pozo) – 2:30
6. "Just When We're Falling in Love" (AKA "Robbins Nest") (Illinois Jacquet, Bob Russell, Sir Charles Thompson) – 2:29

== Personnel ==
Recorded May 26–30, 1969, in Hollywood, Los Angeles:

- Ella Fitzgerald - Vocals
- Gerald Wilson - Arranger, Conductor.
- Tommy Flanagan - piano
- Joe Sample - electric piano, organ
- Louis Bellson - drums
- Modesto Duran - congas
- Francisco DeSouza - congas
- Victor Feldman - vibes, percussion
- Bobby Hutcherson - vibes
- Herb Ellis - guitar
- Dennis Budimir - guitar
- Ray Brown - bass, electric bass
- Bobby Bryant - trumpet
- Larry McGuire - trumpet
- Alex Rodriquez - trumpet
- Paul Hubinon - trumpet
- Harry Edison - trumpet
- J. J. Johnson- trombone
- James Cleveland- trombone
- Mike Wimberly- trombone
- Britt Woodman- trombone
- William Tole- trombone
- Thurman Green- trombone
- Arthur Maebe - French horn, tuba
- Henry DeVega - alto
- Harold Land - tenor
- Ray Bojorquez - tenor
- Richard Aplanalp - baritone
- Marshal Royal - woodwinds
- Anthony Ortega - woodwinds
- Ernie Watts - woodwinds
- Bill Green - woodwinds
