= Ella Fitzgerald's Christmas =

Studio album by Ella Fitzgerald
- Released: November 1967
- Recorded: July 17–18, 1967
- Genre: Jazz
- Length: 27:27
- Label: Capitol
- Producer: Dave Dexter Jr.

Ella Fitzgerald chronology
Brighten the Corner (1967)	Ella Fitzgerald's Christmas (1967)	30 by Ella (1968)

Professional ratings
Review scores
Source	Rating
Allmusic	4.5/5 stars

Ella Fitzgerald's Christmas is a 1967 studio album by Ella Fitzgerald, her second release for Capitol Records. The album consists of religious songs, in contrast to the secular Ella Wishes You a Swinging Christmas (1960). It charted at #27 on the Billboard Holiday Albums chart.

== Track listing ==
For the 1967 LP on Capitol Records; Capitol ST ST 2805; re-issued in 2000 on CD, Capitol 7243 5 27674 2 7

Side One:

1. "O Holy Night" (Adolphe Adam, John Sullivan Dwight) – 1:47
2. "It Came Upon a Midnight Clear" (Edmund Hamilton Sears, Richard Storrs Willis) – 3:21
3. "Hark! The Herald Angels Sing" (Felix Mendelssohn, Charles Wesley) – 1:49
4. "Away in a Manger" (Traditional) – 2:12
5. "Joy to the World" (Lowell Mason, Isaac Watts) – 1:40
6. "The First Noel" (William B. Sandys) – 1:50
7. "Silent Night" (Franz Xaver Gruber, Joseph Mohr) – 2:52

Side Two:

1. "O Come All Ye Faithful" (Frederick Oakeley, John Francis Wade) – 2:45
2. "Sleep, My Little Jesus" – 2:17
3. "Angels We Have Heard on High" (Traditional) – 1:45
4. "O Little Town of Bethlehem" (Phillip Brooks, Lewis H. Redner) – 2:10
5. "We Three Kings" (John Henry Hopkins Jr.) – 2:07
6. "God Rest Ye Merry Gentlemen" (Traditional) – 1:27

== Personnel ==
=== Performance ===
- Ella Fitzgerald – vocal
- Ralph Carmichael – conductor
- Robert Black, Grace Price - arrangers
- Ralph Carmichael's Chorus And Orchestra
