= Misty Blue (album) =

Studio album by Ella Fitzgerald
- Released: 1968
- Recorded: December 20–22, 1967
- Genre: Jazz, blues
- Length: 28:42
- Label: Capitol
- Producer: Dave Dexter, Jr

Ella Fitzgerald chronology
30 by Ella (1968)	Misty Blue (1968)	Sunshine of Your Love (1969)

Professional ratings
Review scores
Source	Rating
AllMusic	3/5 stars

Misty Blue is a 1968 studio album by the American jazz singer Ella Fitzgerald, featuring mostly renditions of recent country music hits. The single "I Taught Him Everything He Knows" reached Billboard's Easy Listening chart.

== Track listing ==
For the 1968 LP on Capitol Records; Capitol ST 2888; re-issued in 1991 on CD, Capitol CDP 7 95152 2

Side One:

1. "Misty Blue" (Bobby Montgomery) – 2:30
2. "Walking in the Sunshine" (Roger Miller) – 2:32
3. "It's Only Love" (Hank Cochran) – 3:04
4. "Evil on Your Mind" (Harlan Howard) – 2:18
5. "I Taught Him Everything He Knows" (Sylvia Dee, Arthur Kent) – 2:47
6. "Don't Let That Doorknob Hit You" (Vic McAlpin) – 2:26

Side Two:

1. "Turn the World Around" (Ben Peters) – 2:45
2. "The Chokin' Kind" (Harlan Howard) – 2:02
3. "Born to Lose" (Ted Daffan) – 3:18
4. "This Gun Don't Care" (Larry Lee) - 2:44
5. "Don't Touch Me" (Hank Cochran) – 2:56

== Personnel ==
Recorded December 20–22, 1967, in Hollywood, Los Angeles:

- Ella Fitzgerald – vocals
- Sid Feller – arranger, conductor
- Dave Dexter, Jr – producer, with Ken Nelson and D. D. Cavanaugh

Album notes by Dave Dexter, Jr.
