= Brighten the Corner =

Studio album by Ella Fitzgerald
- Released: August 1967
- Recorded: July 17–18, 1967
- Genre: Christian music, Popular music
- Length: 45:00
- Label: Capitol
- Producer: Dave Dexter, Jr.

Ella Fitzgerald chronology
Ella and Duke at the Cote D'Azur (1966)	Brighten the Corner (1967)	Ella Fitzgerald's Christmas (1967)

Professional ratings
Review scores
Source	Rating
Allmusic	3/5 stars
The Rolling Stone Jazz Record Guide	3/5 stars

Brighten the Corner is a 1967 studio album by the American jazz singer Ella Fitzgerald, debut album on Capitol Records. The album charted at #172 in the Billboard Hot 200 album charts.

The album was reissued by Capitol Records on CD in 1991 and together, on one CD, with the album "Ella Fitzgerald's Christmas" in 2006.

The album was Ella's first since leaving the Verve label, which had seen her produce her most acclaimed body of work. It marked a sharp change of direction for Fitzgerald, as Brighten the Corner saw Ella sing Christian hymns, reflecting her own spirituality, and eschewing the Great American Songbook standards on which she had previously concentrated.

== Track listing ==
For the 1967 LP on Capitol Records; Capitol ST 2684; Re-issued in 1991 on CD, Capitol CDP 7 95151-2

Side One:

1. "Abide with Me" (Henry Francis Lyte, Arrangers; G. Price, R. Black) - 3.24
2. "Just a Closer Walk with Thee" (Traditional, Arrangers; G. Price, R. Black) - 5.00
3. "The Old Rugged Cross" (George Bennard) - 3.50
4. "Brighten the Corner Where You Are" (Ina D. Ogdon, Charles H. Gabriel ) - 2.33
5. "I Need Thee Every Hour" (Annie S. Hawks, Robert Lowry) - 3.38
6. "In the Garden" (C. Austin Miles) - 3.14
7. "God Be with You Till We Meet Again" (Jeremiah E. Rankin, William G. Tomer) - 1.19

Side Two:

1. "God Will Take Care of You" (Civilla D. Martin, W. Stillman Martin) - 3.29
2. "The Church in the Wildwood" (William S. Pitts) - 3.00
3. "Throw Out the Lifeline" (Edwin Ufford) - 3.12
4. "I Shall Not Be Moved" (Traditional, Arrangers; G. Price, R. Black) - 2.40
5. "Let the Lower Lights Be Burning" (Philip P. Bliss) - 2.46
6. "What a Friend We Have In Jesus" (Joseph M. Scriven, Charles Crozat Converse) - 4.02
7. "Rock of Ages, Cleft for Me" (Augustus Toplady, Thomas Hastings) - 1.58

== Personnel ==
- Ella Fitzgerald - Vocals
- Ralph Carmichael Choir - Vocals
- John Kraus - engineer
- Grace Price, Robert Black - arrangements
