= For Sentimental Reasons (Ella Fitzgerald album) =

Studio album by Ella Fitzgerald
- Released: 1959
- Recorded: 1944–1952
- Genre: Jazz
- Label: Decca

Ella Fitzgerald chronology
Lullabies of Birdland (1955)	For Sentimental Reasons (1959)	Miss Ella Fitzgerald & Mr Gordon Jenkins Invite You to Listen and Relax (1955)

Professional ratings
Review scores
Source	Rating
Allmusic	3/5 stars

For Sentimental Reasons is a 1959 studio album by Ella Fitzgerald, issued on the Decca Records label. The album features tracks recorded during the late 1940s and early 1950s, that had been previously issued on 78 rpm singles.

== Track listing ==
Side one:

1. "(I Love You) For Sentimental Reasons" (William Best, Deek Watson) – 3:13
2. "Guilty" (Richard A. Whiting, Harry Akst, Gus Kahn) – 3:14
3. "It's Too Soon to Know" (Deborah Chessler) – 2:36
4. "Baby Doll" (Johnny Mercer, Harry Warren) – 3:18
5. "Mixed Emotions" (Stuart F. Louchheim) – 3:18
6. "That Old Feeling" (Sammy Fain, Lew Brown) – 2:28

Side two:

1. "Confessin'" (Al Neiburg, Doc Daugherty) – 3:24
2. "A Sunday Kind of Love" (Barbara Belle, Anita Leonard, Stan Rhodes, Louis Prima) – 3:23
3. "There Never Was a Baby like My Baby" (Adolph Green, Betty Comden, Jule Styne) – 2:49
4. "Walking by the River" (Una Mae Carlisle, Robert Sour) – 2:28
5. "Because of Rain" (Nat King Cole, William Harrington, Ruth Pole) – 3:12
6. "Don't You Think I Ought to Know" (William Johnson, Melvin Wettergreen) – 3:08

== Personnel ==
- Ella Fitzgerald – vocals
- The Delta Rhythm Boys – Track 1. (Recorded in 1946)
- Eddie Heywood and His Orchestra – Track 2. (Recorded in 1947)
- Sonny Burke and His Orchestra – Track 4. (Recorded in 1951)
- Sy Oliver and His Orchestra – Tracks 5. (Recorded 1951)
- The Day Dreamers (vocal harmony) – Track 6. (Recorded 1947)
- Johnny Long and His Orchestra – Track 7. (Recorded in 1944)
- Leroy Kirkland and His Orchestra – Track 10. (Recorded in 1952)
- Bob Haggart and His Orchestra – Tracks 8 and 12. (Recorded in 1947)
