= Jackie Davis =

American jazz singer, organist and bandleader

- Davis on the cover of his 1958 album Most Happy Hammond

Background information
- Born: December 13, 1920; Jacksonville, Florida, U.S.
- Died: November 2, 1999 (aged 78); Jacksonville, Florida, U.S.
- Genres: Jazz, soul jazz
- Occupation(s): Musician, bandleader
- Instrument: Hammond organ
- Years active: 1951–1980
- Labels: Capitol, Warner Bros., EMI
- Website: -

Benjamin Jackson Porter "Jackie" Davis (December 13, 1920 – November 2, 1999) was an American soul jazz singer, organist and bandleader. He is notable for his contributions in bringing the Hammond organ to the forefront of jazz and pop, preceding the better-known Jimmy Smith by several years.

== Life and career ==
Davis was born and grew up in Jacksonville, Florida, and started playing piano at the age of ten, before studying music at Florida A&M. He experimented with jazz on the pipe organ, before switching to the Hammond. He was influenced by Wild Bill Davis and Bill Doggett, and after a spell backing Louis Jordan, he started fronting his own jazz groups.

His solo career began in earnest after a residency at the Club Harlem in Philadelphia in 1951, and from there he began touring across the US, with the Hammond now being his trademark. He notably preceded Jimmy Smith in using the instrument in small jazz combos. Regular touring led to a recording contract with Capitol, with whom he recorded several albums. His initial sessions were on a Model B, but by the time he recorded Hi-Fi Hammond Vol.2, he had upgraded to the classic B-3.

In the 1960s, he signed to Warner Bros. Records, releasing Easy Does It as The Jackie Davis Quartet, following it up with Jackie Davis Plus Voices, which also featured the Sid Bass Chorus on backing vocals. For this album, Davis put more of an emphasis on his vocal skills, using the Hammond sparingly.

He made a brief comeback in 1980, recording a self-titled album for EMI, and making a cameo appearance in the film Caddyshack as the country club valet Porterhouse. He kept Jacksonville as his homebase and died on November 2, 1999, following a stroke.

== Legacy ==
While Davis is remembered mostly as a jazz organist, he was capable of a wide variety of styles, though he himself preferred to focus on jazz. In 1963, in an interview for the Hammond Times, he thought "the term 'jazz' is vastly overworked and misused ... Basically, jazz is a style of making music." He felt that the Hammond gave him the versatility he needed to emulate the sound of a big band in a small group. Author and Hammond enthusiast Scott Faragher feels that Davis' recorded output has been overlooked because it sounds dated, but stresses his importance in giving the Hammond recognition in the jazz and pop world should not be underestimated.

Shirley Scott stated her playing was influenced by Davis, claiming he knew "everything about the Hammond organ" and was impressed with his ability to manipulate the instrument.

== Discography ==
=== Studio albums ===
Year	Title	Label	Format	Notes
1952	Jackie Davis Trio	Trend TL-1010	10" LP	
1956	Hi-Fi Hammond	Capitol T-686	LP	
1956	Organistics	Kapp KL-1030	LP	reissue of Trend album plus 4 additional songs
1957	Chasing Shadows	Capitol T-815	LP	
1958	Jumpin' Jackie	Capitol T-974	LP	
1958	Most Happy Hammond	Capitol T-1046	LP	
1959	Jackie Davis Meets the Trombones	Capitol T-1180	LP	
1959	Hammond Gone Cha-Cha	Capitol T-1338	LP	
1960	Tiger on the Hammond	Capitol T-1419	LP	
1960	Hi-Fi Hammond, Vol. 2	Capitol T-1517	LP	
1962	Big Beat Hammond	Capitol T-1686	LP	
1963	Easy Does It	Warner Bros. W-1492	LP	
1963	Jackie Davis Plus Voices	Warner Bros. W-1515	LP	with Sid Bass Chorus
196?	Jackie Davis Plays The Park Plaza	RCA Victor (Canada) PC-1061	LP	
196?	Here's Jackie	Kei-Mar Records JD-10701	LP	
1968	The Sacred Side of Jackie Davis	Brunswick BL-754143	LP	
197?	Jackie Davis Entertains!	Columbia (Canada) EL-112	LP	
197?	The Jackie Davis Story	EMI 5C 052.81029	LP	reissue of Hi-Fi Hammond, Vol. 2
1980	Jackie Davis	EMI 1A 054.26474	LP	
2007	Jackie Davis	Fonos LP-9410	CD	reissue

=== Compilations ===
Year	Title	Label	Format	Notes
1970	The Best of Jackie Davis	Capitol 5C 054.80309	LP	
1996	Mambo Fever - Ultra-Lounge, Vol. 2	Capitol CDP 7243 8 32564 2 6	CD	various artists sampler features 2 tracks by Davis: "Manana (Is Soon Enough For Me)" and "Glow Worm Cha-Cha-Cha".
1996	Organs in Orbit - Ultra-Lounge, Vol. 11	Capitol CDP 7243 8 37597 2 9	CD	various artists sampler features 2 tracks by Davis: "Love Is Just Around The Corner" and "Perfidia".
2001	The Story of Jazz - Jackie Davis	EMI 724357621526	CD	
2008	Jumping Hi-Fi Hammond	Jasmine JASCD 472	2-CD	reissues Hi-Fi Hammond, Chasing Shadows, Jumpin' Jackie, Most Happy Hammond
2016	Jackie Davis: Five Classic Albums	Avid EMSC 1202	2-CD	reissues Jumpin' Jackie, Jackie Davis Meets The Trombones, Hammond Gone Cha-Cha, Tiger On The Hammond, Big Beat Hammond

=== As sideman ===
Rel.	Performer	Title	Label	Format	Notes
1955	Dinah Washington	After Hours with Miss D	Emarcy MG 36028	LP, CD	
1958	Louis Jordan	Man We're Wailin'	Mercury MG 20331	LP	
1978	Ella Fitzgerald	Lady Time	Pablo 2310 825	LP, CD	
