= Ella in Japan: 'S Wonderful =

Live album by Ella Fitzgerald
- Released: 2011
- Recorded: January 19 and 22, 1964
- Venue: Hibiya Public Hall, Tokyo, Japan; Hotel Okura, Tokyo, Japan
- Genre: Jazz
- Label: Verve
- Producer: Norman Granz

Ella Fitzgerald chronology
Twelve Nights in Hollywood (2009)	Ella in Japan: 'S Wonderful (2011)	Live in Paris, Vol. 1 (2012)

Professional ratings
Review scores
Source	Rating
AllMusic	4/5 stars

Ella in Japan: 'S Wonderful is a 1964 live album by the American jazz singer Ella Fitzgerald, recorded in Tokyo, Japan. Norman Granz sold the Verve label to MGM Records in 1961, but continued to manage her career and produce Ella Fitzgerald's recordings. Granz supervised frequently live concert tours, planning several live projects for release on record. In late January 1964 work began on an album called Ella In Nippon; the album did not reach past the post-production stage, remaining uncompleted and unreleased for 47 years. Tracks 1 to 12 on this 2011 release are the tracks Norman Granz mixed for the unreleased album Ella In Nippon.

== Track listing ==
Disc One: Recorded January 19, 1964, at Hibiya Public Hall, Tokyo, Japan.

1. "Cheek to Cheek" (Irving Berlin) - 3:47
2. "Deep Purple" (Peter DeRose, Mitchell Parish) - 3:59
3. "Too Close for Comfort" (Jerry Bock, Larry Holofcener, George Weiss) - 2:20
4. "I Love Being Here with You" (Peggy Lee, William Schluger) - 3:21
5. "Fly Me to the Moon (In Other Words)" (Bart Howard) - 3:00
6. "'S Wonderful" (George Gershwin, Ira Gershwin) - 2:34
7. "I've Got You Under My Skin" (Cole Porter) - 2:59
8. "Hallelujah I Love Him So" (Ray Charles) - 2:38
9. "Misty" (Johnny Burke, Erroll Garner) - 3:09
10. "Whatever Lola Wants" (Richard Adler, Jerry Ross) - 2:48
11. "Bill Bailey" (Hughie Cannon) - 3:43
12. "The Blues (Ella's Blues)" (Ella Fitzgerald) - 4:38
13. "'Round Midnight" (Bernie Hanighen, Thelonious Monk, Cootie Williams) - 3:20
14. "I Can't Get Started" (Vernon Duke, Ira Gershwin) - 4:39
15. "Undecided" (Sid Robin, Charles Shavers) - 6:43
16. "Jam Session" - 10:53

Disc Two: Recorded January 22, 1964, at the Hotel Okura, Tokyo, Japan.

1. "Cheek to Cheek" (Irving Berlin) - 3:32
2. "Shiny Stockings" (Ella Fitzgerald, Frank Foster) - 3:29
3. "Can't Help Lovin' Dat Man" (Oscar Hammerstein II, Jerome Kern) - 4:31
4. "Bill Bailey" (Hughie Cannon) - 3:44
5. "Take the "A" Train" (Billy Strayhorn) - 5:02
6. "Closing/A-Tisket, A-Tasket" (Al Feldman, Ella Fitzgerald) - 0:38
7. "Ain't Misbehavin'" (Harry Brooks, Andy Razaf, Thomas 'Fats' Waller) - 3:42
8. "My Last Affair" (Haven Johnson) - 3:56
9. "Perdido" (Ervin Drake, Jan Lengsfelder, Juan Tizol) - 6:58
10. "Closing/A-Tisket, A-Tasket" (Al Feldman, Ella Fitzgerald) - 0:49

== Personnel ==
Disc One: Tracks 1 to 12;

- Ella Fitzgerald - vocals
- Roy Eldridge Quartet:
- Roy Eldridge - trumpet
- Tommy Flanagan - piano
- Bill Yancy - bass
- Gus Johnson - drums

Tracks 13 to 16;

- Roy Eldridge Quartet and guest musicians from Japan

Disc Two: Tracks 1 to 6;

- Ella Fitzgerald - vocals
- Roy Eldridge Quartet:
- Roy Eldridge - trumpet
- Tommy Flanagan - piano
- Bill Yancy - bass
- Gus Johnson - drums

Tracks 7 to 10;

- Ella Fitzgerald - vocals
- Roy Eldridge - trumpet
- Arrow Jazz Orchestra
