= Ella Fitzgerald Sings the Johnny Mercer Song Book =

Studio album by Ella Fitzgerald
- Released: 1964
- Recorded: October 19–21, 1964
- Studio: Radio Recorders (Los Angeles)
- Genre: Jazz
- Length: 43:58
- Label: Verve
- Producer: Norman Granz

Ella Fitzgerald chronology
Hello, Dolly! (1964)	Ella Fitzgerald Sings the Johnny Mercer Song Book (1964)	Ella at Juan-Les-Pins (1964)

Professional ratings
Review scores
Source	Rating
AllMusic	4.5/5 stars
Encyclopedia of Popular Music	5/5 stars
The Penguin Guide to Jazz Recordings	3/4 stars

Ella Fitzgerald Sings the Johnny Mercer Song Book is a 1964 studio album by the American jazz singer Ella Fitzgerald, with the Nelson Riddle Orchestra, focusing on the songs of Johnny Mercer. It was recorded in Los Angeles, California. This is Fitzgerald's fifth and final collaboration with Riddle during her years on the Verve label. It is also the last of the "Song Book" series of LPs dedicated to great American songwriters, which had begun in 1956 with Ella Fitzgerald Sings the Cole Porter Song Book.

== Track listing ==
For the 1964 Verve LP release; Verve V6-4067; Re-issued in 1984 on CD, Verve-PolyGram 823 247–2

Side One:

1. "Too Marvelous for Words" (Richard A. Whiting) – 2:31
2. "Early Autumn" (Ralph Burns) – 3:51
3. "Day In, Day Out" (Rube Bloom) – 2:49
4. "Laura" (from the film Laura) (David Raksin) – 3:43
5. "This Time the Dream's on Me" (Harold Arlen) – 2:54
6. "Skylark" (Hoagy Carmichael) – 3:12
7. "Single-O" (Donald Kahn, Johnny Mercer) – 3:19

Side Two:

1. "Something's Gotta Give" (Mercer) – 2:33
2. "Trav'lin' Light" (Jimmy Mundy, Trummy Young) – 3:47
3. "Midnight Sun" (Francis J. Burke, Lionel Hampton) – 4:55
4. "Dream" (Mercer) – 2:58
5. "I Remember You" (Victor Schertzinger) – 3:38
6. "When a Woman Loves a Man" (Bernie Hanighen, Gordon Jenkins) – 3:51

All lyrics by Johnny Mercer, composers between brackets.

== Personnel ==
Recorded October 19–21, 1964, at Radio Recorders Studio 10-H, Hollywood:

- Ella Fitzgerald – vocals
- Nelson Riddle – arranger and conductor
- Paul Smith on piano
- Plas Johnson on tenor sax
- Willie Smith on alto sax
- Buddy DeFranco on clarinet
- Frank Flynn on vibes
- Val Valentin – recording engineer
