= Twelve Nights in Hollywood =

Twelve Nights In Hollywood

Live album by Ella Fitzgerald
- Released: November 10, 2009
- Recorded: 11–21 May 1961, and June 29–30, 1962
- Venue: Crescendo Club, West Hollywood
- Genre: Jazz
- Label: Verve
- Producer: Norman Granz

Ella Fitzgerald chronology
Ella Returns to Berlin (1991)	Twelve Nights In Hollywood (2009)	Rhythm Is My Business (1962)

Professional ratings
Review scores
Source	Rating
AllMusic	4.5/5 stars

Twelve Nights in Hollywood is a 2009 live album by the American jazz vocalist Ella Fitzgerald, recorded at the Crescendo Club in West Hollywood, California, over ten nights in May 1961, and a subsequent pair of performances in June 1962.

In 1961 Fitzgerald released an album of her live performances at the Crescendo, Ella in Hollywood. This album repeats none of those tracks, or the subsequent two singles that resulted from her 1962 stay, "Ol' Man Mose" and "Bill Bailey".

== Track listing ==
For Volume 1 & 2 issued on Verve 2CD; Verve B0014022-2

Disc One:

1. Introduction – 0:48
2. "Lover Come Back to Me" (Oscar Hammerstein II, Sigmund Romberg) – 1:55
3. "Too Close for Comfort" (Jerry Bock, Larry Holofcener, George David Weiss) – 2:39
4. "Little White Lies" (Walter Donaldson) – 3:01
5. "On the Sunny Side of the Street" (Dorothy Fields, Jimmy McHugh) – 2:49
6. "Ac-Cent-Tchu-Ate the Positive" (Harold Arlen, Johnny Mercer) – 2:53
7. "Baby, Won't You Please Come Home" (Charles Warfield, Clarence Williams) – 3:47
8. "I Found a New Baby" (Jack Palmer, Spencer Williams) – 2:28
9. "On a Slow Boat to China" (Frank Loesser) – 2:25
10. "My Heart Belongs to Daddy" (Cole Porter) – 3:15
11. "Perdido" (Ervin Drake, Hans J. Lengsfelder, Juan Tizol) – 6:52
12. "I've Got a Crush on You" (G. Gershwin, I. Gershwin) – 2:23
13. "But Not for Me" (G. Gershwin, I. Gershwin) – 2:10
14. "You Brought a New Kind of Love to Me" (Sammy Fain, Irving Kahal, Pierre Norman) – 3:03
15. "Across the Alley from the Alamo" (Joe Greene) – 2:00
16. "I'm Glad There Is You" (Jimmy Dorsey, Paul Mertz) – 3:15
17. "'Round Midnight" (Bernie Hanighen, Thelonious Monk, Cootie Williams) – 3:37
18. "Take the 'A' Train" (Billy Strayhorn) – 6:45
19. "(If You Can't Sing It) You'll Have to Swing It (Mr. Paganini)" (Sam Coslow) – 4:10

Disc Two:

1. "Nice Work If You Can Get It" (G. Gershwin, I. Gershwin) – 02:29
2. "I Can't Get Started" (Vernon Duke, I. Gershwin) – 3:31
3. "Give Me the Simple Life" (Rube Bloom, Harry Ruby) – 1:53
4. "Caravan" (Duke Ellington, Irving Mills, Tizol) – 2:05
5. "One for My Baby (and One More for the Road)" (Arlen, Johnny Mercer) – 4:18
6. "Lorelei" (G. Gershwin, I. Gershwin) – 3:16
7. "A-Tisket, A-Tasket" (Van Alexander, Ella Fitzgerald) – 1:54
8. "Witchcraft" (Cy Coleman, Carolyn Leigh) – 3:04
9. "Gone with the Wind" (Herb Magidson, Allie Wrubel) – 2:31
10. "Happiness is a Thing Called Joe" (Arlen, Yip Harburg) – 3:45
11. "It's De-Lovely" (Porter) – 2:15
12. "The Lady Is a Tramp" (Lorenz Hart, Richard Rodgers) – 2:41
13. "That Old Black Magic" (Arlen, Mercer) – 3:33
14. "Lullaby of Birdland" (George Shearing, George David Weiss) – 2:08
15. Ella Introduces the Band – 0:39
16. "Imagination" (Johnny Burke (lyricist), Jimmy Van Heusen) – 2:41
17. "Blue Moon" (Hart, Rodgers) – 3:08
18. "Joe Williams' Blues" (Fitzgerald) – 7:21

For Volume 3 & 4 issued on Verve 2CD; Verve B0014394-2

Disc Three:

1. "The Lady's in Love with You" (Burton Lane, Loesser) – 1:39
2. "Love Is Here to Stay" (G. Gershwin, I. Gershwin) – 3:34
3. "Come Rain or Come Shine" (Arlen, Mercer) – 3:36
4. "Anything Goes" (Porter) – 02:26
5. "This Could Be the Start of Something Big" (Steve Allen) – 2:25
6. "Candy" (Mack David, Joan Whitney Kramer, Alex Kramer) – 5:07
7. "Little Girl Blue" (Hart, Rodgers) – 3:49
8. "You're Driving Me Crazy" (Donaldson) – 3:30
9. "It's All Right with Me" (Porter) – 2:33
10. "Just Squeeze Me (But Please Don't Tease Me)" (Ellington, Lee Gaines) – 2:49
11. "'S Wonderful" (G. Gershwin, I. Gershwin) – 2:28
12. "How High the Moon" (Nancy Hamilton, Morgan Lewis) – 6:20
13. "Deep Purple" (Peter DeRose, Mitchell Parish) – 2:17
14. "In the Wee Small Hours of the Morning" (Bob Hilliard, David Mann) – 3:33
15. "Mack the Knife" (Marc Blitzstein, Bertolt Brecht, Kurt Weill) – 3:53
16. "Exactly Like You" (Fields, McHugh) – 4:30
17. "Rock It for Me" (Kay Werner, Sue Werner) – 3:35
18. "Stompin' at the Savoy" (Benny Goodman, Andy Razaf, Edgar Sampson, Chick Webb) – 6:49
19. "Love for Sale" (Porter) – 4:11
20. "St. Louis Blues" (W. C. Handy) – 6:05

Disc Four: Recorded on June 29–30, 1962

1. "All of Me" (Harold Marks, Seymour Simons) – 3:15
2. "Hard Hearted Hannah" (Milton Ager, Chas Bates, Bob Bigelow, Jack Yellen) – 2:38
3. "Broadway" (Billy Bird, Teddy McRae, Henri Woode) – 2:46
4. "My Kind of Boy" (Leslie Bricusse) – 2:42
5. "It Had to Be You" (Isham Jones, Gus Kahn) – 3:56
6. "C'est Magnifique" (Porter) – 3:28
7. "How Long Has This Been Going On?" (G. Gershwin, I. Gershwin) – 2:49
8. "When Your Lover Has Gone" (Einar Aaron Swan) – 2:10
9. "Taking a Chance on Love" (Vernon Duke, Ted Fetter, John Latouche) – 2:23
10. "Good Morning Heartache" (Drake, Dan Fisher, Irene Higginbotham) – 4:24
11. "Clap Hands! Here Comes Charley!" (Ballard MacDonald, Joseph Meyer, Billy Rose) – 3:23
12. "Hallelujah I Love Him So" (Ray Charles) – 2:19
13. "Angel Eyes" (Matt Dennis, Earl Brent) – 3:25
14. "Ol' Man Mose" (Louis Armstrong, Zilner Randolph) – 3:13
15. "Teach Me Tonight" (Sammy Cahn, de Paul) – 3:06
16. Medley: "Too Darn Hot"/"Ella's Twist" (Porter)/(Fitzgerald) – 1:10
17. "Too Darn Hot" – 2:41
18. "Bewitched, Bothered and Bewildered" (Hart, Rodgers) – 5:19
19. "Won't You Come Home Bill Bailey" (Hughie Cannon) – 3:41
20. "Bill Bailey Reprise" – 3:32

== Personnel ==
=== Performance ===
Discs 1 to 3:

- Ella Fitzgerald - vocals
- Lou Levy - piano
- Herb Ellis - guitar
- Wilfred Middlebrooks - double bass
- Gus Johnson - drums

Disc 4:

- Ella Fitzgerald - vocals
- Paul Smith - piano
- Wilfred Middlebrooks - double bass
- Stan Levey - drums
