= Ella Returns to Berlin =

Live album by Ella Fitzgerald
- Released: 1991
- Recorded: February 11, 1961
- Genre: Jazz
- Length: 60:10
- Label: Verve
- Producer: Norman Granz

Ella Fitzgerald chronology
Clap Hands, Here Comes Charlie! (1961)	Ella Returns to Berlin (1991)	Twelve Nights In Hollywood (2009)

Professional ratings
Review scores
Source	Rating
Allmusic	4/5 stars
Encyclopedia of Popular Music	4/5 stars
The Penguin Guide to Jazz Recordings	3/4 stars

Ella Returns to Berlin is a 1961 (see 1961 in music) live album by Ella Fitzgerald, with a trio led by the pianist Lou Levy, and also featuring the Oscar Peterson trio.

The album's title refers to Fitzgerald's more famous concert in Berlin a year earlier (Ella in Berlin: Mack the Knife), which had included her famous rendition of "Mack the Knife", which earned her a Grammy Award for Best Female Vocal Performance (Single).

Like Ella in Rome: The Birthday Concert, this concert was first released thirty years after it was originally recorded, in 1991.

== Track listing ==
For the 1991 Verve-PolyGram CD Reissue, Verve-PolyGram 837 758-2

1. "Introductions and Announcements" – 1:20
2. "Give Me the Simple Life" (Rube Bloom, Harry Ruby) – 2:03
3. "Take the "A" Train" (Billy Strayhorn) – 3:46
4. "On a Slow Boat to China" (Frank Loesser) – 2:21
5. Medley: "Why Was I Born?"/"Can't Help Lovin' Dat Man"/"People Will Say We're in Love" (Jerome Kern, Oscar Hammerstein II), (Kern, Hammerstein)/ (Richard Rodgers, Hammerstein) – 5:37
6. "Introduction" – 0:11
7. "You're Driving Me Crazy" (Walter Donaldson) – 3:24
8. "Rock It for Me" (Sue Werner, Kay Werner) – 3:24
9. "Witchcraft" (Cy Coleman, Carolyn Leigh) – 2:55
10. "Anything Goes" (Cole Porter) – 2:34
11. "Cheek to Cheek" (Irving Berlin) – 3:44
12. "Misty" (Johnny Burke, Erroll Garner) – 2:57
13. "Caravan" (Duke Ellington, Irving Mills, Juan Tizol) – 2:02
14. "(If You Can't Sing It) You'll Have to Swing It (Mr. Paganini)" (Sam Coslow) – 4:45
15. "Mack the Knife" (Marc Blitzstein, Bertolt Brecht, Kurt Weill) – 3:30
16. "Fanfare for Ella" – 0:22
17. "'Round Midnight" (Bernie Hanighen, Thelonious Monk, Cootie Williams) – 3:31
18. "Joe Williams' Blues" (Ella Fitzgerald) – 5:27
19. "Fanfare for Ella" – 0:53
20. "This Can't Be Love" (Lorenz Hart, Rodgers) – 4:30
21. "Closing Announcements by Norman Granz" – 0:54

== Personnel ==
Recorded February 11, 1961, Berlin, Germany:

- Ella Fitzgerald - Vocals
- Lou Levy - Piano
- Wilfred Middlebrooks - Bass
- Gus Johnson - Drums
- Herb Ellis - Guitar

Track 20 features; The Oscar Peterson Trio

- Oscar Peterson - Piano
- Ray Brown - Bass
- Ed Thigpen - Drums
