= Ella Fitzgerald Live at Mister Kelly's =

Live album by Ella Fitzgerald
- Released: 2007
- Recorded: August 10, 1958; Mister Kelly's, Chicago
- Genre: Jazz
- Length: 45:33
- Label: Verve
- Producer: Norman Granz

Ella Fitzgerald chronology
| Ella in Rome: The Birthday Concert (1958) | Ella Fitzgerald Live at Mister Kelly's (1958) | Get Happy! (1959) |

Professional ratings
Review scores
| Source | Rating |
|---|---|
| Allmusic | 4/5 stars |

Ella Fitzgerald Live at Mister Kelly's is a live album of a 1958 Ella Fitzgerald performance at Mister Kelly's, and released in 2007.

Released to coincide with the 90th anniversary of Fitzgerald's birth, this is one of several live albums that Fitzgerald recorded in the late 1950s. Sarah Vaughan had recorded an album at Mister Kelly's several months earlier.

It was a rare outing for several of the songs on this album. Fitzgerald had only recorded "Your Red Wagon" as a single and featured here are her debut recordings of "Witchcraft", "In the Wee Small Hours of the Morning" and "Across the Alley from the Alamo" among several others.

== Track listing ==
For 2007 2CD release on Verve Records; Verve B0008923-02

Disc One: "The Main Show"

1. "Your Red Wagon" (Gene de Paul, Richard M. Jones, Don Raye) - 2:59
2. "Nice Work If You Can Get It" (George Gershwin, Ira Gershwin) - 2:35
3. "I'm Glad There Is You" (Jimmy Dorsey, Paul Mertz) - 2:53
4. "How Long Has This Been Going On?" (G. Gershwin, I. Gershwin) - 2:44
5. "Across the Alley from the Alamo" (J. Greene) - 2:14
6. "Perdido" (Juan Tizol, Ervin Drake, Hans Lengsfelder) - 5:45
7. "The Lady Is a Tramp" (Richard Rodgers, Lorenz Hart) - 3:01
8. "Bewitched, Bothered and Bewildered" (Rodgers, Hart) - 5:48
9. "Summertime" (G. Gershwin, Dubose Heyward) - 5:00
10. "In the Wee Small Hours of the Morning" (Bob Hilliard, Dave Mann) - 3:55
11. "St. Louis Blues" (W.C. Handy) - 6:13
12. "Witchcraft" (Cy Coleman, Carolyn Leigh) - 2:57
13. "Love Me or Leave Me" (Walter Donaldson, Gus Kahn) - 3:48
14. "Joe Williams' Blues" (Ella Fitzgerald) - 5:57
15. Porgy and Bess Medley: "I Love You Porgy"/"Porgy, I's You Woman Now" (G. Gershwin, I. Gershwin, Heyward)/(G. Gershwin, I. Gershwin, Heyward) - 5:48
16. "How High the Moon" (Morgan Lewis, Nancy Hamilton) - 6:56

Disc Two: "The Late Show"

1. Introductions - 1:54
2. "Exactly Like You" (Dorothy Fields, Jimmy McHugh) - 7:37
3. "Come Rain or Come Shine" (Harold Arlen, Johnny Mercer) - 4:29
4. "Stardust" (Hoagy Carmichael, Mitchell Parish) - 6:15
5. "'S Wonderful" (G. Gershwin, I. Gershwin) - 1:35
6. "You Don't Know What Love Is" (DePaul, Raye) - 3:37
7. "Witchcraft" (Cy Coleman, Carolyn Leigh) - 2:51
8. "Perdido" (Juan Tizol, Ervin Drake, Hans Lengsfelder) - 6:30
9. "In the Wee Small Hours of the Morning" (David Mann, Bob Hilliard) - 4:04
10. "My Funny Valentine" (Rodgers, Hart) - 3:04
11. "Anything Goes" (Cole Porter) - 2:09

== Personnel ==
Recorded August 10, 1958 at Mister Kelly's, Chicago:

- Ella Fitzgerald - vocals
- Lou Levy - piano
- Max Bennett - double bass
- Gus Johnson - drums
