= Clap Hands, Here Comes Charlie! =

Studio album by Ella Fitzgerald
- Released: 1961
- Recorded: January 23 and June 22–23, 1961
- Genre: Jazz
- Length: 58:25
- Label: Verve
- Producer: Norman Granz

Ella Fitzgerald chronology
Ella in Hollywood (1961)	Clap Hands, Here Comes Charlie! (1961)	Ella Returns to Berlin (1991)

Professional ratings
Review scores
Source	Rating
AllMusic	3/5 stars
Encyclopedia of Popular Music	4/5 stars
The Penguin Guide to Jazz Recordings	3/4 stars
New Record Mirror	5/5 stars

Clap Hands, Here Comes Charlie! is a 1961 studio album by Ella Fitzgerald, with a jazz quartet led by Lou Levy. The painting on the cover is by Jean Dubuffet. The liner notes are by Benny Green of the London Observer.

== Track listing ==
For the 1961 Verve LP album, Verve V-4053 (Mono) & V6-4053 (Stereo)

Side One:

1. "A Night in Tunisia" (Dizzy Gillespie, Frank Paparelli) – 4:06
2. "You're My Thrill" (Sidney Clare, Jay Gorney) – 3:35
3. "My Reverie" (Larry Clinton, Claude Debussy) – 3:16
4. "Stella by Starlight" (Ned Washington, Victor Young) – 3:17
5. "'Round Midnight" (Bernie Hanighen, Thelonious Monk, Cootie Williams) – 3:28
6. "Jersey Bounce" (Tiny Bradshaw, Buddy Feyne, Edward Johnson, Bobby Plater) – 3:33
7. "Signing Off" (Leonard Feather, Jessyca Russell) – 3:45

Side Two:

1. "Cry Me a River" (Arthur Hamilton) – 4:13
2. "This Year's Kisses" (Irving Berlin) – 2:14
3. "Good Morning Heartache" (Ervin Drake, Dan Fisher, Irene Higginbotham) – 4:17
4. "(I Was) Born to Be Blue" (Mel Tormé, Bob Wells) – 2:42
5. "Clap Hands! Here Comes Charlie!" (Ballard MacDonald, Joseph Meyer, Billy Rose) – 2:41
6. "Spring Can Really Hang You Up the Most" (Fran Landesman, Tommy Wolf) – 6:13
7. "The Music Goes Round and Round" (Eddie Farley, Red Hodgson, Mike Riley) – 2:27

Bonus Tracks; Issued on the 1989 Verve-PolyGram CD Reissue, Verve-PolyGram 835 646-2 and DAT W.L.S.T. 1994 835 646 - 4

15. "The One I Love (Belongs to Somebody Else)" (Previously unreleased) (Isham Jones, Gus Kahn) – 2:12

16. "I Got a Guy" (Previously unreleased) (Marion Sunshine) – 3:43

17. "This Could Be the Start of Something Big" (Previously unreleased) (Steve Allen) – 2:43

== Personnel ==
Tracks 1 to 14; recorded 22–23 June 1961 in Los Angeles

Tracks 15 to 17; recorded 23 January 1961 in New York

- Ella Fitzgerald – vocals
- Lou Levy – piano
- Herb Ellis – guitar
- Joe Mondragon – bass on tracks 1–14 only
- Wilfred Middlebrooks – double bass on tracks 15–17 only
- Gus Johnson – drums
