= Clap Hands, Here Comes Charlie =

Clap Hands, Here Comes Charlie (/ Charley) can refer to:

- "Clap Hands! Here Comes Charley!", a 1925 song by Billy Rose, Ballard MacDonald and Joseph Meyer
- Clap Hands, Here Comes Charlie!, a 1961 studio album by Ella Fitzgerald
