= Clap Hands! Here Comes Rosie! =

Studio album by Rosemary Clooney
- Released: 1960
- Recorded: February 18–27, 1960
- Genre: Vocal jazz
- Length: 31:09
- Label: RCA Victor

Rosemary Clooney chronology
Rosie Swings Softly (1960)	Clap Hands! Here Comes Rosie! (1960)	Rosie Solves the Swingin' Riddle! (1960)

Professional ratings
Review scores
Source	Rating
Allmusic	3/5 stars

Clap Hands! Here Comes Rosie! is a 1960 studio album by Rosemary Clooney, arranged by Bob Thompson and released by RCA Victor. The album earned Clooney a 1961 Grammy Award nomination for Best Female Vocal Performance (Album), but she lost to Ella Fitzgerald for Ella in Berlin: Mack the Knife.

== Track listing ==
1. "Clap Hands! Here Comes Rosie!"/"Everything's Coming Up Roses" (Ballard MacDonald, Joseph Meyer, Billy Rose)/(Stephen Sondheim, Jule Styne) – 2:20
2. "Give Me the Simple Life" (Rube Bloom, Harry Ruby) – 2:33
3. "Bye Bye Blackbird" (Mort Dixon, Ray Henderson) – 2:43
4. "Aren't You Glad You're You?" (Johnny Burke, Jimmy Van Heusen) – 2:17
5. "You Got" (Bernard) – 2:44
6. "Too Marvelous for Words" (Johnny Mercer, Richard Whiting) – 2:10
7. "Something's Gotta Give" (Mercer) – 2:20
8. "Hooray for Love" (Harold Arlen, Leo Robin) – 2:26
9. "Mean to Me" (Fred E. Ahlert, Roy Turk) – 3:36
10. "Oh, What a Beautiful Mornin'" (Oscar Hammerstein II, Richard Rodgers) – 2:14
11. "It Could Happen to You" (Burke, Van Heusen) – 2:30
12. "Makin' Whoopee" (Walter Donaldson, Gus Kahn) – 3:16

== Personnel ==
=== Performance ===
- Rosemary Clooney – vocal
- Bob Thompson – arranger, conductor
