= Stittsville (album) =

Studio album by Sonny Stitt
- Released: 1960
- Recorded: June 1960; New York City
- Genre: Jazz
- Label: Roost; RLP 2244
- Producer: Teddy Reig

Sonny Stitt chronology
Sonny Stitt Swings the Most (1959)	Stittsville (1960)	Previously Unreleased Recordings (1960)

Professional ratings
Review scores
Source	Rating
Allmusic	3/5 stars

Stittsville is an album by saxophonist Sonny Stitt recorded in 1960 and originally released on the Roost label.

== Reception ==
The Allmusic site awarded the album 3 stars.

== Track listing ==
All compositions by Sonny Stitt except as indicated

1. "Angel Eyes" (Matt Dennis, Earl Brent) - 3:13
2. "It All Depends on You" (Ray Henderson, Buddy DeSylva, Lew Brown) - 2:50
3. "Stormy Thursday" - 3:22
4. "Embraceable You" (George Gershwin, Ira Gershwin) - 2:35
5. "It Could Happen to You" (Johnny Burke, Jimmy Van Heusen) - 3:23
6. "But Not For Me (Gershwin, Gershwin) - 3:07
7. "Memories of You" (Eubie Blake, Andy Razaf) - 5:09
8. "I Cried for You" (Gus Arnheim, Arthur Freed, Abe Lyman) 3:15
9. "Bright as Snow" - 2:44
10. "Spinning" - 2:26

== Personnel ==
- Sonny Stitt - alto saxophone 1,4,10, tenor saxophone all others
- Jimmy Jones - piano
- Unknown musician - bass
- Roy Haynes - drums
