= The Crescendo (music venue) =

- Address: 8572 Sunset Blvd
- Location: West Hollywood, California 90069
- Owner: Gene Norman
- Type: Nightclub

Construction
- Opened: 1954
- Closed: 1964

Website
- gnpcrescendo.com/wp/

The Crescendo was a West Hollywood music venue located at 8572 Sunset Boulevard. It opened in 1954, along with the Interlude upstairs, and ran until 1964. The club's performers included Ella Fitzgerald, Louis Armstrong, Johnny Mathis, and Duke Ellington, Nat King Cole, Peggy Lee, and comedians Lenny Bruce and Mort Sahl. The venue was frequented by celebrities such as Marilyn Monroe, Eddie Fisher, Sammy Davis Jr., Jacques Sernas, and crime boss Mickey Cohen.

== History ==
The Crescendo was owned and operated by Gene Norman (né Eugene Abraham Nabatoff; 1922–2015) of GNP Crescendo Records, who had purchased the property in 1954 from singer Billy Eckstine, who had run the venue as the Chanticlair. The Chanticlair, Crescendo, and Interlude welcomed integrated audiences.

Norman sold the Crescendo in 1963 to focus on GNP Crescendo Records. Carl Greenhouse acquired the club, and on June 4, 1965, it reopened as Crescendo Tiger's Tail. On September 22, 1965, it changed its name to The Trip, and by early 1967, it had become The New Crescendo.

== Performers ==
Performers at the Crescendo included:

- Herb Alpert and the Tijuana Brass
- Louie Armstrong
- Count Basie
- Oscar Brown, Jr.
- Eddie Cano
- Chubby Checker
- June Christy
- Sam Cooke
- Joey Dee & the Starliters
- Billy Eckstine
- Duke Ellington
- Ella Fitzgerald
- Dizzy Gillespie
- Chico Hamilton
- Billie Holiday
- Harry James
- Louis Jordan
- Stan Kenton
- Perez Prado
- Machito
- Herbie Mann
- Shelly Manne
- Gerry Mulligan
- Anita O'Day
- Perez Prado
- George Shearing
- Nina Simone
- Art Tatum
- Cal Tjader
- Mel Torme
- Sarah Vaughan
- Ray Vasquez

Folk music was represented with appearances by:

- The Limeliters
- Joe & Eddie
- Theodore Bikel
- Chad Mitchell
- Jim McGuinn

The club also headlined comics including:

- Woody Allen
- Shelley Berman
- Lenny Bruce
- Lord Buckley
- Bill Cosby
- Redd Foxx
- Dick Gregory
- Tom Lehrer
- Bob Newhart
- Don Rickles
- Mort Sahl
- Jonathan Winters

== Selected recordings at the Crescendo ==
1954:	Art Tatum	Live at the Crescendo, Vol. 1 & 2
1954:	Earl Hines	Live at the Crescendo, Vol. 2 (released 1992)
1955:	Louis Armstrong	Louis Armstrong at the Crescendo, Vol. 1, Vol. 2 & Vol. 3,
1955:	Frank Morgan, Conte Candoli and Machito's Rhythm Section	Gene Norman Presents: Frank Morgan with Conte Candoli and Machito's Rhythm Section; Note: the CD reissue of this album adds 5 tracks recorded August 1956 at the Crescendo with Jack Sheldon, Frank Morgan, James Clay, Bobby Timmons, Jimmy Bond, Lawrence Marable
1956:	Billy Daniels	Gene Norman Presents: Mr. Black Magic – Billy Daniels at the Crescendo
1957:	Mel Tormé	Mel Tormé at the Crescendo
1958:	George Shearing & The Quintet	On the Sunny Side of the Strip (released 1960)
1958:	Count Basie & His Atomic Band	Complete Live at the Crescendo (re-released 2016; 5 CDs)
1959:	René Touzet and His Orchestra	René Touzet and His Orchestra Play for Dancing at the Crescendo on the World Famous Sunset Strip (featuring Ray Vasquez)
1959:	Frances Faye	Caught in the Act
1961:	T. C. Jones	T. C. Jones – Himself! (released 1961)
1960:	Jeri Southern	Jeri Southern at the Crescendo
1960:	Lambert, Hendricks & Ross with Zoot Sims	The Swingers!
1960:	Eddie Cano & Jack Costanzo; With Tony Martinez and His Orchestra	Dancing on the Sunset Strip
1960:	The Teddy Buckner Band	Frank Bull (Note: Frank Nova Bull (1897–1975) was a Kansas-born radio announcer in Los Angeles.) and Gene Norman Present: The Teddy Buckner Band on the Sunset Strip
1961:	Ella Fitzgerald	Ella in Hollywood | Twelve Nights in Hollywood
1961:	Machito	Machito at the Crescendo
1963:	Jonah Jones	And Now in Person ... Jonah Jones
1963:	Arthur Lyman	The Exotic Sounds of ... Arthur Lyman at the Crescendo (re-issued in 1965 as Cast Your Fate to the Wind)
1964:	Wayne Newton	In Person!
