= Charlie Kunz =

US-born UK pianist and band leader (1896–1958)

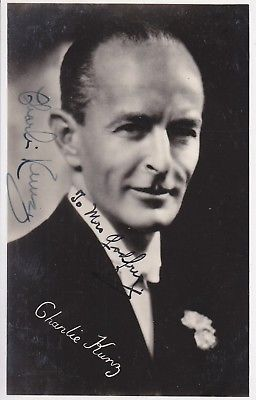

Background information
- Born: Charles Leonard Kunz; August 18, 1896; Allentown, Pennsylvania
- Died: March 16, 1958 (aged 61)
- Occupations: Bandleader, musician
- Instrument: Piano
- Years active: 1912–1958
- Labels: Decca Records, Sterno Records, Rex

Charles Leonard Kunz (August 18, 1896 – March 16, 1958) was an American-born pianist and band leader who worked in Great Britain during the British dance band era, eventually becoming a well-known solo pianist.

== Life and career ==
Kunz was born in Allentown, Pennsylvania, United States, the only son of Margaret T. (Wehr) and Leonard Kunz, a master baker who played the French horn. He made his debut aged six and made his first appearance as a prodigy aged seven. During World War I, he led his own resident band, while working in a munitions factory.

He came to the United Kingdom in 1922 as a pianist in a small dance band. He was to remain there until his death from a heart attack in 1958. Kunz was such a distinctive and popular pianist that he abandoned his orchestra to concentrate on his piano playing, both at music hall venues and on the BBC. Two of Britain's most famous female vocalists were with his orchestra in the 1930s: Vera Lynn and Welsh songstress Dorothy Squires. His best known crooner was George Barclay.

Kunz was the pianist in a dance band which was led by the drummer, Ed Krick. The band came to London in 1922 to play a residency in the London Trocadero. The band returned without Kunz to Pennsylvania after a successful run at the 'Troc' and, until 1998, still got together for sessions for retirement homes, renamed as 'The B Flats'.

His debut as a soloist came in 1934 at the Holborn Empire, London followed by countless variety theatres in Britain and the Continent, after playing in hotels, restaurants and ballrooms. The same year saw the beginning of what was to become a continuous output of solo records of "Charlie Kunz Medleys". His signature tune was "Clap Hands, Here Comes Charlie", and his closing theme was "Pink Elephants".

He became the highest paid pianist in the world, earning up to £1,000 a week. His piano transcriptions sold widely in the teaching of piano-playing. Kunz's playing style was a relaxed flowing interpretation of popular melodies played with subtle soft and loud accents, which he called "melody and rhythm with expression".

He was married three times. His first marriage was to Amanda Dysher. They had a son, Joseph; she predeceased Kunz. His second marriage was to Eva Dorothy "Nin" Lloyd, a fashion model, from 1923 to 1939; they had two sons, Peter and Gerald. In 1939, he was living with Eva in Elmer Road, Chichester. Kunz's last marriage was to Pat Sparkes from 1942 to 1958.

He is buried in Streatham Vale Cemetery.
