= Woody Allen (album) =

Live album by Woody Allen
- Released: July 1964
- Recorded: March 1964
- Venues: Mister Kelly's, Chicago
- Genre: Comedy
- Length: c.37 minutes
- Label: Colpix CP 518

Woody Allen chronology
Woody Allen (1964)	Volume Two (1965)

Woody Allen is a live 1964 comedy album by the American comedian and later notable film director Woody Allen. This was Allen's debut recording, and was recorded at Mister Kelly's nightclub in Chicago. It was the first of three comedy albums released by Allen.

== Overview ==
It was nominated for the Grammy Award for Best Comedy Performance at the 7th Annual Grammy Awards in 1965; it lost to Bill Cosby's album I Started Out as a Child, which coincidentally had also been recorded at Mister Kelly's.

The album peaked at No. 63 on the Billboard Top LPs during an eleven-week stay on the chart.

== Reception ==
Billboard magazine highlighted the album as a Comedy Spotlight in their July 25, 1964 issue and wrote that "He is a very funny fellow. The material is uniformly hilarious throughout the album. Of course Allen's delivery is polished to a point whereby he may soon be the nation's No 1. comedian".

== Track listing ==
1. "Private Life"
2. "Brooklyn (incl. Floyd)"
3. "The Army"
4. "Pets (incl. Spot)"
5. "My Grandfather"
6. "My Marriage"
7. "The Bullet"
8. "N.Y.U."
9. "A Love Story"
10. "The Police (incl. Library Book, Neanderthal)"
11. "Summing Up"

== Personnel ==
- Scotty Schacter, Jerry De Clercq – engineer
- Don Bronstein – photography
- Jack Lewis – producer

== Influence ==
Many comedians have cited Allen's influence on them and their work. In an interview John Mulaney specified that he had listened to Allen's 1965 album.

== Awards ==
Year	Award	Category	Work	Result	Ref.
1964	Grammy Award	Best Comedy Album	Woody Allen Album	Nominated	

== 1964–1968 ==
Three albums, Woody Allen, recorded at Mr. Kelly’s in Chicago, March 1964 (Colpix release #515); Woody Allen Volume 2, recorded at The Shadows, Washington D.C. (Colpix release #488), April 1965; and The Third Woody Allen Album, recorded at Eugene's ("a cabaret dedicated to raise money to aid Eugene McCarthy"), San Francisco, August 1968 (Capitol #2986); were reissued, in 1972, as a gatefold 2-LP record set, Woody Allen: The Night Club Years 1964-1968, in 1978, as a gatefold 2-LP record set, Woody Allen: Standup Comic, and in 2014, as a CD boxset, Woody Allen: The Stand-Up Years: 1964–1968.

== Woody Allen On Comedy ==
Woody Allen On Comedy was released by Laugh.Com, tracks, of which, are provided to YouTube.

== Charts ==
Chart (1964)	Peak position
US Billboard Top LPs	63
