= Gene Norman =

American television and radio host (1922–2015)

- Norman at KFWB Radio
- Born: Eugene Abraham Nabatoff; January 30, 1922; Brooklyn, New York, U.S.
- Died: November 2, 2015 (aged 93); Los Angeles, California, U.S.
- Occupations: Nightclub owner; music promoter; record label owner; radio disc jockey; television host
- Years active: 1948–2015
- Children: Neil Norman

Gene Norman (born January 30, 1922) was a nightclub owner, music promoter, record label owner, radio disc jockey, and television host. He purchased The Crescendo in 1954 in West Hollywood where he booked jazz artists including Ella Fitzgerald, Louis Armstrong, Johnny Mathis, Duke Ellington, Peggy Lee, and comics Don Rickles, Mort Sahl, Lenny Bruce, and Bob Newhart. He recorded many live recordings at the venue and released them on his record label "Gene Norman Presents". He later expanded the label's genres to include R&B, blues, and pop music. As a disc jockey he was well known as one of the "Big 5" disc jockeys at KLAC in the 1950s as well as hosting the television show, "The Gene Norman Show." In 1991, he was inducted into the American Association of Independent Music's Hall of Fame.

== Early life and education ==
Eugene Abraham Nabatoff was born in Brooklyn, New York on January 30, 1922, to parents Abraham and Emma (née Goldin) Nabatoff. He was a trained classical violinist and played saxophone and clarinet in college dance bands. After studying at the University of Michigan, he graduated from the University of Wisconsin when he was 18 years old. During his teen years he frequented jazz clubs in New York City.

== Career ==
Norman hitchhiked from Brooklyn, New York to San Francisco in the 1940s and changed his surname from Nabatoff to Norman at the start of his broadcasting career while working as a disc jockey in San Francisco at KGO-NBC. He later moved to Los Angeles where he worked as a disc jockey at KFWB and KLAC (1944 - 1954) and became one of the leading disc jockeys in the area. Norman left the radio field in 1954. His radio show had aired four hours nightly, seven days a week, for 12 years in Los Angeles.

While still a disc jockey at KFWB, Norman began booking artists such as Louis Armstrong, Nat King Cole, Duke Ellington, Charlie Barnet, Peggy Lee, Anita O'Day, The Robins, and Stan Kenton at venues in Los Angeles and Long Beach, including the Hollywood Bowl. In an interview with Billboard in 1974, Norman said, "Around 1947, Benny Goodman and myself decided there was a real lack of live jazz in town. So we put on our first jazz concert using Pasadena Civic as the location because it was the best hall in town." He later started promoting concerts as "Gene Norman Presents" and expanded the bookings to San Diego, Seattle, Portland, and Vancouver with such artists as Count Basie, Dizzy Gillespie, and Billy Eckstine. In 1948, Norman opened the Empire on Vine St. in Hollywood where he booked the Woody Herman Band, Billy Eckstine, and released the live album, "Just Jazz."

Norman hosted the first televised jazz concert on KTLA before hosting his own weekly TV show, "The Gene Norman Show," on NBC in 1951. Guests included Peggy Lee, Patricia Morison, Tex Ritter, Cab Calloway, and Mel Torme. He acted as visual "disc jockey" for three-minute transcriptions for such artists as Les Brown, Lionel Hampton, Earl Grant, and Nat King Cole.

In 1954, Norman purchased the Crescendo where he brought artists such as Ella Fitzgerald, Louis Armstrong, Duke Ellington, Peggy Lee, and Johnny Mathis. Later he purchased the Interlude, a smaller club which was upstairs from the Crescendo, and played a significant role in developing the careers of new comics including Woody Allen, Mort Sahl, Lenny Bruce, Mike Nichols and Elaine May.

In that same year he launched independent record label, "Gene Norman Presents," which would later become known by its acronym, "GNP Records." The label produced live recorded albums at the Crescendo night club by such artists as Louis Armstrong, Ella Fitzgerald, Count Basie, and Art Tatum, among others.

In 1957, Norman expanded the label's roster to include R&B, blues, pop, and jazz music. He traveled internationally negotiating representation deals in Spain, Scandinavia, Germany, Switzerland, Italy, and the UK where he promoted the label's then-current charting single, Pushin' Too Hard, by the Seeds to be played by commercial radio stations in Europe. In 2014, Gene's son, Neil Norman, directed and produced the documentary film, "The Seeds: Pushin’ Too Hard," which received favorable reviews.

== Personal life ==
Norman was married to June Bright, a fashion model and actress, with whom he had one child, Neil Norman.
