= Rhythm Is My Business =

Studio album by Ella Fitzgerald
- Released: 1962
- Recorded: January 30–31, 1962
- Genre: Jazz
- Length: 42:25
- Label: Verve
- Producer: Norman Granz

Ella Fitzgerald chronology
Twelve Nights in Hollywood (2009)	Rhythm Is My Business (1962)	Ella Swings Brightly with Nelson (1962)

Professional ratings
Review scores
Source	Rating
AllMusic	3/5 stars
Encyclopedia of Popular Music	4/5 stars
New Record Mirror	5/5 stars
The Penguin Guide to Jazz Recordings	3/4 stars

Rhythm Is My Business is a 1962 studio album by the American jazz singer Ella Fitzgerald. The album was recorded with a big band and arranged and conducted by the American R&B organist Bill Doggett.

DownBeat magazine gave this album 3½ stars, commenting that the emphasis here was on "swinging". Billboard reviewed the album in September 1962 and said that it "rates a lot of play".

== Track listing ==
For the 1962 Verve LP release; Verve MG V-4056

Side one

No.	Title	Writer(s)	Length
1.	"Rough Ridin'"	Ella Fitzgerald, Hank Jones, William Tennyson	2:51
2.	"Broadway"	Billy Bird, Teddy McRae, Henri Woode	2:43
3.	"You Can Depend on Me"	Charles Carpenter, Louis Dunlap, Earl Hines	3:32
4.	"Runnin' Wild"	Arthur Gibbs, Joe Grey, Leo Wood	2:40
5.	"Show Me the Way to Get Out of This World 'Cause That's Where Everything Is"	Les Clark, Matt Dennis	2:42
6.	"I'll Always Be in Love with You"	Bud Green, Herman Ruby, Sam H. Stept	2:50

Side two

No.	Title	Writer(s)	Length
7.	"Hallelujah, I Love Him So"	Ray Charles	2:34
8.	"I Can't Face the Music"	Rube Bloom, Ted Koehler	5:00
9.	"No Moon at All"	Redd Evans, Dave Mann	2:36
10.	"Laughin' on the Outside"	Ben Raleigh, Bernie Wayne	4:53
11.	"After You've Gone"	Henry Creamer, Turner Layton	4:08

1999 CD reissue bonus tracks

No.	Title	Writer(s)	Length
12.	"Taking a Chance on Love"	Vernon Duke, Ted Fetter, John Latouche	2:35
13.	"If I Could Be with You"	Creamer, James P. Johnson	2:39

Note: Track 7 has only been re-issued on CD in mono, due to the loss of the stereo master tape.

== Personnel ==
- Ella Fitzgerald – vocals
- Bill Doggett – organ, arranger/conductor
- Taft Jordan – trumpet
- Ernie Royal – trumpet
- Joe Wilder – trumpet
- Melba Liston – trombone
- Kai Winding – trombone
- Britt Woodman – trombone
- Carl Davis – reeds
- Jerry Dodgion – reeds
- William Shakesnider – reeds
- Les Taylor – reeds
- Phil Woods – reeds
- Hank Jones – piano
- Mundell Lowe – guitar
- Lucille Dixon – double bass
- George Duvivier – double bass
- Gus Johnson – drums
