= The Music Goes 'Round and Around =

"The Music Goes 'Round and 'Round"

Single by Tommy Dorsey and his Clambake Seven
- B-side: "(If I Had) Rhythm in My Nursery Rhymes"
- Published: 1935 by Select Music Publications
- Released: December 1935
- Recorded: October 24, 1935
- Genre: Jazz
- Label: Victor 25201
- Composers: Edward Farley and Mike Riley
- Lyricist: Red Hodgson

"The Music Goes 'Round and Around", also known as "The Music Goes 'Round and 'Round", is a popular song written in 1935.

== History ==
Trumpet player Edward Farley and trombonist Mike Riley were working at the Onyx club in New York with the singer Red McKenzie's five-piece band when, in September 1935, they happened to compose and record a novelty number for Decca Records (with lyrics supplied by Red Hodgson) called "The Music Goes 'Round and Around." Decca had been in business for only a year and was still struggling to stay alive, even though its roster included Bing Crosby. But the record was an overnight sensation, selling some hundred thousand copies and transforming the fledgling company into a major label.

A recording of the song by Tommy Dorsey and his Clambake Seven (with vocals by Edythe Wright) for the Victor label became a hit in 1936. The song was the musical interlude for the Columbia movie The Music Goes 'Round in 1936. The New York Times wrote: "If we really wanted to be nasty about it, we could say that this Farley-Riley sequence is the best thing in the new picture. At least it makes no pretense of being anything but a musical interlude dragged in by the scruff of its neck to illustrate the devastating effect upon the public of some anonymous young busybody's question about the workings of a three-valve sax horn. Like the "March of Time," it preserves in film the stark record of a social phenomenon—in this case, the conversion of a song hit into a plague, like Japanese beetles or chain letters." It has since been recorded by many other artists and has become a pop and jazz standard. It has long been the staple theme of college radio's Irrelevant Show on WMUC-FM, in College Park, Maryland (United States), as well as the radio program Nostalgia Unlimited on 3CR AM in Melbourne, Australia.

The Tommy Dorsey-Edythe Wright recording (they actually mention each other in the song) is played over the ending credits of Me and Orson Welles (2009).

Danny Kaye performed a version of the song with Susan Gordon in the 1959 film The Five Pennies. It was included on the 1961 Ella Fitzgerald album Clap Hands, Here Comes Charlie! (Verve).

In DTV, the Tommy Dorsey version of the song was set entirely to the Donald Duck short Donald and the Wheel (1961) with a bit of Trombone Trouble (1944) for the lyrics "Oh you / I blow through here."

In 1992, the song was used as the soundtrack for a very popular, long-running stop-motion animated UK TV commercial for Weetabix Ltd's Weetos breakfast cereal. The advert featured Professor Weeto singing the song (with revised lyrics, recorded to replicate the sound of the 1936 original), while he demonstrated the operation of his Weetos Machine.

Beginning in 2018, the song was used in a stage show of the same name at Knott's Berry Farm starring the Peanuts characters.

In the Three Stooges short "Half Shot Shooters", Curly sings a short version of the song while loading an artillery gun.
