= Mel Tormé at the Crescendo (1957 album) =

Live album by Mel Tormé
- Released: 1957
- Recorded: February 22, 1957
- Venues: The Crescendo, Hollywood, CA
- Genre: Vocal jazz
- Length: 38:23
- Label: Bethlehem

Mel Tormé chronology
Mel Tormé Sings Fred Astaire (1956)	Mel Tormé at the Crescendo (1957)	Mel Tormé's California Suite (1957)

Professional ratings
Review scores
Source	Rating
Allmusic	4/5 stars

Gene Norman Presents Mel Tormé at the Crescendo is a 1957 live album by Mel Tormé, recorded at The Crescendo nightclub in Los Angeles (not to be confused with a 1955 album of the same name).

== Track listing ==
1. "It's Only a Paper Moon" (Harold Arlen, Yip Harburg, Billy Rose) – 3:22
2. "What Is This Thing Called Love?" (Cole Porter) – 3:55
3. "One for My Baby (and One More for the Road)" (Arlen, Johnny Mercer) – 4:47
4. "Love Is Just a Bug" (Specs Powell) – 2:32
5. "A Nightingale Sang in Berkeley Square" (Eric Maschwitz, Manning Sherwin) – 2:53
6. "Autumn Leaves" (Joseph Kosma, Mercer, Jacques Prévert) – 1:32
7. "Just One of Those Things" (Porter) – 2:29
8. "The Girl Next Door" (Ralph Blane, Hugh Martin) – 2:58
9. "Lover, Come Back to Me" (Oscar Hammerstein II, Sigmund Romberg) – 2:43
10. "Looking at You" (Porter) – 2:50
11. "(Love Is) The Tender Trap" (Sammy Cahn, Jimmy Van Heusen) – 3:26
12. "I'm Beginning to See the Light" (Duke Ellington, Don George, Johnny Hodges, Harry James) – 2:23

== Personnel ==
- Mel Tormé - vocals
- Marty Paich - piano, arranger
- Larry Bunker - vibraphone
- Don Fagerquist - trumpet
- Max Bennett - double bass
- Mel Lewis - drums
