= Rosie Swings Softly =

Studio album by Rosemary Clooney
- Released: 1960
- Recorded: 1960
- Genre: Vocal jazz
- Length: 31:01
- Label: Verve

Rosemary Clooney chronology
Clap Hands! Here Comes Rosie! (1959)	Rosie Swings Softly (1960)	Rosie Solves the Swingin' Riddle! (1961)

Professional ratings
Review scores
Source	Rating
Allmusic	3/5 stars

Rosie Swings Softly is a 1960 studio album by Rosemary Clooney, recorded originally by MGM Records.

== Track listing ==
1. "For You" (Joe Burke, Al Dubin) – 1:56
2. "Always Together" (Heino Gaze, Carl Sigman) – 2:48
3. "You Ol' Son of a Gun" (Danny Arnold, Hal Dickinson, Jack Lloyd) – 2:33
4. "I Wonder" (Gilbert) – 2:49
5. "Always Be in Love" (Ian Bernard) – 2:24
6. "Grieving for You" (Joe Gibson, Jack Gold, Joe Ribaud) – 2:48
7. "With You and Me" (Bernard) – 2:22
8. "Looking For a Boy" (George Gershwin, Ira Gershwin) – 2:13
9. "With the Night" (Bernard) – 2:59
10. "Love Eyes" (Moose Charlap, Norman Gimbel) – 2:31
11. "Sorry for Myself" (Charlap, Gimbel) – 2:40
12. "Keep It Simple" (Ray Evans, Jay Livingston) – 2:58

== Personnel ==
=== Performance ===
- Rosemary Clooney – vocal
