= Bob Thompson (musician, born 1924) =

American musician (1924–2013)

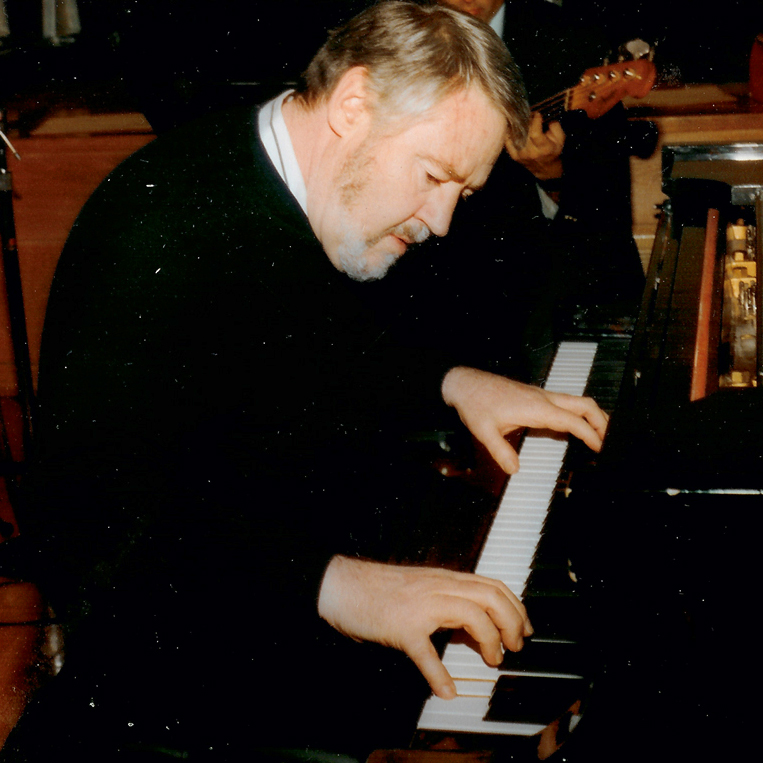
- Bob Thompson in 1990

Background information
- Born: Robert Lamar Thompson; August 24, 1924; San Jose, California, United States
- Died: May 21, 2013 (aged 88) Los Angeles, California
- Genres: Space age pop; easy listening; jazz
- Occupations: Orchestra leader, composer, arranger
- Instrument: Piano
- Years active: 1955-1980
- Labels: Dot, RCA Victor
- Website: bobthompsonmusic.com

Robert Lamar Thompson (August 24, 1924 – May 21, 2013) was a composer, arranger, and orchestra leader from the 1950s through the 1980s. Active in Los Angeles, Thompson was a recording artist for RCA Victor and Dot Records, scored film and television soundtracks, and wrote musical accompaniments for commercials. He composed, arranged, and conducted the orchestra for such wide-ranging artists as Rosemary Clooney, Mae West, Julie London, Bing Crosby, The Andrews Sisters, Chet Atkins, Duane Eddy, Judy Garland, Jerry Lewis, and Phil Ochs.

In an interview, Van Dyke Parks, who hired Thompson to arrange "Canon in D" for his 1976 album Clang of the Yankee Reaper, said: "In terms of raw invention, I place Bob in the pantheon of Spike Jones, Les Paul, and Juan García Esquivel. Like Beethoven, they were 'populists' in good heart. They meant to appeal to the masses, and did so, by enlightening them."

Thompson is considered a prime exponent of what has belatedly been termed "Space Age Pop," or "Space Age Bachelor Pad Music." This style of breezy, experimental orchestral music became popular in the 1950s and 1960s following the introduction of the long-playing microgroove record and the advent of high-fidelity and stereo home audio systems, which allowed enhanced sonic reproduction. In Thompson's 2013 L.A. Times obit, Koop Kooper, creator of the “Cocktail Nation” podcast and radio show, called Thompson "a seminal figure, a major inventor of this kind of music."

== Education ==
Thompson was born in San Jose, California, in 1924. He was a music student at UC Berkeley composing shows and creating arrangements with noted philosopher Stanley Cavell. Although he did not graduate, Thompson apprenticed with Professor William Denny of UC Berkeley after graduation.

== Early career ==
Thompson played piano in bands in Sacramento and sat in with Barney Bigard, who was the clarinetist in Duke Ellington's band. He moved to San Francisco and got his first arranging job at radio station KGO writing arrangements for The Standard Hour. Next, he went to Paris and arranged for Jacqueline Francois and Gloria Lasso, before returning to Los Angeles. He toured as the arranger and bandleader for actress Mae West.

== Space Age pop records ==
On the Rocks (1959)

Thompson's albums as a bandleader are Just for Kicks, Mmm, Nice!, and On the Rocks (all on RCA Victor Records), The Sound of Speed (Dot Records, 1960).

Just For Kicks and Mmm, Nice! were recorded at Radio Recorders in 1958 and 1959 respectively, and On the Rocks was recorded at RCA Victor Studios in late 1959. All three RCA Victor albums featured top session musicians from the late 1950s west coast jazz scene, including drummer Shelly Manne, percussionist Emil Richards, alto saxophonist Bud Shank, trombonist Frank Rosolino, trumpeter Al Porcino, guitarist Al Hendrickson, and bassist Red Callender. Vocals were provided by Judd Conlon singers and Marni Nixon. "Just for Kicks" received a Grammy Award nomination in 1959 for Best Performance by an Orchestra. Although released in mono and stereo, the stereo versions of the RCA records carry the Living Stereo branding and logo on the covers.

The Sound of Speed was described by Irwin Chusid, who produced several reissues of Thompson's work, as:

a 'concept' LP [that] rhapsodizes the technology of human transport, from Vespa scooters to Le Mans racers, from tricycles to rocket ships. Each of the dozen vehicular vignettes is book-ended by authentic sound effects, with vivid stereo motion.

Thompson was one of the arrangers for Bing Crosby's I Wish You a Merry Christmas (Warner Bros. Records, 1962).

Thompson provided the arrangements for a number of RCA Victor Records artists after the Space Age pop albums, such as Bing Crosby, Maureen O'Hara, Julie London, Duane Eddy. He arranged Clap Hands! Here Comes Rosie! and Thanks for Nothing for Rosemary Clooney. In the 1960s, Thompson was Clooney's touring bandleader who the singer noted for his knowledge of musical theory and the pair shared a musical affinity. Although not close, Thompson made an effort to help Clooney with substance abuse problems and drove her home from the Ambassador Hotel immediately after Sen. Robert F. Kennedy was assassinated. Thompson arranged Holiday in Europe for Bing Crosby and composed "Moment in Madrid" on that record. RCA also hired Thompson to arrange How the West Was Won which featured Crosby and Rosemary Clooney.

== Film and television ==
Thompson provided the theme music for The Rise and Fall of Legs Diamond (1960) and scored the film Thumb Tripping (1972). He contributed arrangements for the films Picnic (1955), Seven Men from Now (1956; title theme), The Long Hot Summer (1958), and I Love You, Alice B. Toklas! (1968). Thompson provided the theme and arrangements for General Electric True hosted by Jack Webb, as well as the theme for the sixth and final season of ABC-TV's 77 Sunset Strip.

== Offbeat projects ==
Criswell, lionized in a Mae West lyric with music by Thompson, as he appeared in Plan 9 from Outer Space

Thompson composed music Mae West's lyrics for a song called "Criswell Predicts," about the flamboyant American psychic, The Amazing Criswell. He wrote the music for That Agency Thing, an Industrial musical for CBS Radio Sales, with lyrics by Alan Alch (1963). Alch and Thompson also wrote Candelabra Boogie, a comedic homage to Liberace, sung by Jerry Lewis. Thompson provided the arrangements for Dan Blocker's Tales for Young'uns. Thompson composed "Happy Hobo" for Felix Slatkin's Conducts Fabulous Percussion and "Marching the Blues" for Felix Slatkin's Fantastic Brass Marches the Blues. He arranged Katie Lee's Songs of Couch and Consultation that was a comedic salute to psychoanalysis.

== Commercials ==
Although not responsible for lyrics or ad copy, Thompson composed and arranged for approximately 1000 commercials. "Bob made a study of rock, soul, how the Fender Rhodes was played in pop music, and the advent of the synthesizer," wrote his son Spenser Thompson. "He incorporated those styles judiciously into commercials — even though his passion was playing Jerome Kern, Thelonious Monk, or a minor blues on the piano."

Thompson received several awards in the 50s, 60s, and 70s including Clio Awards for excellence in advertising music and an International Advertising Festival Award.

== Reissues and contemporary uses ==
The Sound of Speed was reissued by itself on CD by Bacchus Archives in 2004 and on vinyl by Sundazed Music in 2010. The three RCA albums were reissued together with bonus tracks by the Spanish reissue label Blue Moon Producciones as a two-CD set in 2011. Bertelsmann Music Group, that purchased RCA Victor Recordings, included Thompson in its History of Space Age Pop series (1994). The Space Age Pop Records also contain original compositions, which have been anthologized on the Sound of Style (2008). Over the last 30 years, these songs have been selected to appear on television and film including "The Big Journey" episode of Sex and the City (2002), an Old Navy commercial, and the I'm Reed Fish soundtrack (2006).

Thompson died in Los Angeles in 2013, his LA Times obituary stating: "Thompson's music set a mood, but was more than mood music."

== Discography ==
- Seven Men From Now / Goodbye Old Girl (Zephyr Records, 1956)
- Just For Kicks (RCA Victor, 1958)
- The Sound of Speed (Dot Records, 1958)
- Mmm, Nice! (RCA Victor, 1959)
- On the Rocks (RCA Victor, 1959)
- The Sound of Speed (Dot Records, 1960)
- Music From Wildcat (RCA Victor, 1961)
- That Agency Thing (Private pressing, 1963)
