= T. C. Jones =

American actor (1920–1971)

- Jones, 1965
- Born: Thomas Craig Jones; 26 October 1920; Scranton, Pennsylvania, U.S.
- Died: 25 September 1971 (aged 50); Duarte, California, U.S.
- Occupations: Female impersonator, actor, dancer
- Spouse: Connie S. Dickson

Thomas Craig "T. C." Jones (October 26, 1920 – September 25, 1971) was an American female impersonator, actor, and dancer who from the mid-1940s to the late 1960s performed on stage, in nightclubs, films, and on television. He was known chiefly in the entertainment industry for his imitations in full costume of many famous actresses and other women, including Tallulah Bankhead, Mae West, Judy Garland, Katharine Hepburn, Bette Davis, Édith Piaf, and Carmen Miranda. In 1959, the American magazine Time described Jones as "probably the best female impersonator since vaudeville's late famed Julian Eltinge".

== Early life and education ==
T. C. Jones was born in 1920 in Scranton, Pennsylvania. Prior to his entertainment career, he attended Bethany College in West Virginia to study for the Campbellite ministry, but midway through his education there he was "bitten by the acting bug" after spending one summer performing in plays in a stock company. That stage experience convinced him to leave Bethany and return to Pennsylvania to enroll in drama school at Carnegie Tech in Pittsburgh. Soon, with the outbreak of World War II, Jones joined the United States Navy and served as a pharmacist's mate at naval hospitals in Philadelphia and in Jacksonville, Florida.

== Professional career ==
After his discharge from naval service, Jones moved to New York City in the fall of 1943, hoping to resume his plans for a stage career. He secured a job as a "chorus boy" in Willie Howard's Broadway musical My Dear Public before obtaining more substantial parts in the productions Jackpot and Sadie Thompson. During times when he was not being cast in additional plays, Jones served as an assistant stage manager. This position afforded him many opportunities to observe and study closely the speech patterns, mannerisms, and costume choices of a variety of actresses. Soon he began imitating those performers and impressing his theatre colleagues with his talent for mimicry, so much so that they encouraged him to display those abilities to audiences.

By 1946 Jones began working professionally in New York as a female impersonator, first with the Provincetown Players in Greenwich Village. Cast as "Fat Fanny", he performed his first impersonations on stage in the Players' production of E. E. Cummings' play Him. He later recalled how simply his performance specialty started at that time: "One night...another of the players brought me some...material that was hilarious. The only catch was that it more or less required a woman to deliver it. He suggested I do an impersonation." Public reaction to his performance was so positive that it led Jones to develop a nightclub act featuring his female characters.

Jones next moved to the Jewel Box Revue in Miami, where he presented and refined his impersonations of stars such as Tallulah Bankhead, Katharine Hepburn, Édith Piaf, Claudette Colbert, and Bette Davis. Jones's performances, especially his portrayal of Bankhead, attracted the attention of theatrical producer Leonard Sillman, who cast him in New Faces of 1956, a revue directed by Paul Lynde. Although some people had strongly advised Sillman not to cast Jones, the producer stated, "I never think of T.C. as a female impersonator, as a man imitating a woman. T.C. on stage is simply an extraordinarily talented woman." Jones in the revue entered the stage by descending a staircase to the tune "Isn't She Lovely" and, as Bankhead, acted as mistress of ceremonies. The show proved to be a hit, running for 220 performances. The following year Jones starred in Mask and Gown, another Broadway revue. Jones toured with Mask and Gown nationally and internationally, but it was unsuccessful.

Jones in the latter half of the 1950s appeared in regional theatrical productions, including The Man Who Came to Dinner. He also played the nightclub circuit, performed in lounges of major Las Vegas hotels, and recorded two albums: the original cast recording of Mask and Gown (1958) and T. C. Jones – Himself! (not released until 1961). Jones also recorded an album with the original cast for New Faces of 1956 (1956), and he released the single "Champagne Cocktails" b/w "Sunless Sunday" (1956).

On television, after performing twice on The Ed Sullivan Show, he was cast in several television series in the 1960s. He portrays the psychotic serial killer Nurse Betty Ames in "An Unlocked Window", a 1965 Edgar Award-winning episode of The Alfred Hitchcock Hour, as well as a similar type role in "Night of the Running Death", a 1967 episode of The Wild Wild West.

Jones also performed in several Hollywood films during that period. He appears in a male role opposite Jayne Mansfield in the 1963 sex comedy Promises! Promises!, in the role of Henry with Mamie Van Doren in the 1964 comedy 3 Nuts in Search of a Bolt, as Mrs. Terry in the 1968 thriller The Name of the Game Is Kill!, and in dual male/female roles as Mr. and Mrs. Ace in The Monkees' 1968 satirical musical Head.

Despite his additional work in films and on television, Jones in the 1960s continued his regular stage and nightclubs shows. The Los Angeles Times, for example, announces the following in its August 6, 1965 edition: "Wardrobe and wigs valued at more than $100,000 will be worn by T. C. Jones, female impersonator, when he opens Tuesday in his one-man revue, 'That Was No Lady,' at the Ivar Theatre."

== Personal life and death ==
Jones in the 1950s married Connie S. Dickson, a former actress and competitive fencer, who owned a chain of beauty parlors in San Francisco. She, in fact, met Jones for the first time when he visited one of her parlors in search of a new wig for his performances. The couple maintained a home in San Francisco for many years, sharing it at one point with 19 Siamese cats. They later relocated to Covina, east of Los Angeles. where they were residing at the time of T.C.'s death.

In September 1971, after being treated for cancer for two years, Jones died at age 50 at the City of Hope Medical Center in Duarte, California. He was interred at Rose Hills Memorial Park in Whittier, California. Three years after Jones's death, writing for Newhouse News Service, the correspondent and theatre critic William A. Raidy reflected on the entertainer's talent and shared a personal experience that underscored how effective and convincing Jones was in his performances:

I remember being in the audience during a matinee [of New Faces of 1956] in Boston. Jones had done savage but hilarious imitations of Bette Davis and Tallulah Bankhead. The two elderly Back Bay matrons next to me were enjoying his routines immensely, but had no inkling of his true gender. At the end of the show T.C. came out and, as was the tradition in those days, took off his woman's wig, bearing a very shiny bald head. One of the ladies exclaimed, "Oh, the poor old girl's bald."

== Bibliography ==
- Barrios, Richard (2003). Screened Out: Playing Gay in Hollywood from Edison to Stonewall. Routledge; ISBN 0-415-92329-8.
- Botto, Louis, Robert Viagas and Brian Stokes Mitchell (2002). At this Theatre: 100 Years of Broadway Shows, Stories and Stars. Hal Leonard Corporation; ISBN 1-55783-566-7.
- Krafsur, Richard P., Kenneth W Munden and the American Film Institute (1997). The American Film Institute Catalog of Motion Pictures Produced in the United States: Feature Films, 1961-1970. University of California Press; ISBN 0-520-20970-2.
- Senelick, Laurence (2000). The Changing Room: Sex, Drag and Theatre. Routledge; ISBN 0-415-15986-5.
- Tropiano, Stephen (2002). The Prime Time Closet: A History of Gays and Lesbians on TV. New York, Applause Theatre and Cinema Books; ISBN 1-55783-557-8.
- Wallraff, John (2002). From Drags to Riches: The Untold Story of Charles Pierce. Haworth Press; ISBN 1-56023-386-9.
- Willmeth, Don B. and Leonard Jacobs (2007). The Cambridge Guide to American Theatre. Cambridge University Press; ISBN 0-521-83538-0.
