= We All Love Ella: Celebrating the First Lady of Song =

Studio album by Various
- Released: June 6, 2007
- Recorded: 2006–2007 (exc. track 14)
- Genre: Jazz, big band
- Length: 36:31
- Label: Verve
- Producer: Phil Ramone (exc. track 9)

We All Love Ella: Celebrating the First Lady of Song is a 2007 tribute album to Ella Fitzgerald produced by Phil Ramone for Verve Records, released to mark the 90th anniversary of her birth. The "all-star" list of featured vocalists is backed for most part by an orchestra led by Rob Mounsey. The album contains the first release of a duet of Ella Fitzgerald and Stevie Wonder, who joined her on stage with her small band at the New Orleans Jazz and Heritage Festival in 1977.

Ramone described the album as "a celebration, a hug, and a kiss" to Fitzgerald and that the album was intended to pass her music to a new generation.

The album's release coincided with a concert at the Galen Center of the University of Southern California featuring several of the musicians on the album. It was broadcast on PBS as part of their Great Performances series. The concert was co-hosted by Natalie Cole and Quincy Jones and featured Ruben Studdard and Dave Koz, James Moody, Take 6 and Patti Austin, Wynonna Judd, and Nancy Wilson.

== Reception ==
Christina Pazzanese felt the album was "hit-and-miss" in her review for The Boston Globe. Pazzanese described Natalie Cole as the best at capturing Fitzgerald's "sunny buoyancy" and praises k.d. lang's "smokey lusciousness" on "Angel Eyes". She was particularly critical of Gladys Knight, Dianne Reeves and Diana Krall, describing them as "a major letdown", "tepid, overly polite" and "plodding" respectively. In The Philadelphia Daily News, Jonathan Takiff wrote that the album left him feeling "oddly underwhelmed" with only Etta James and Michael Bublé offering the "Mona Lisa-like moodiness of Fitzgerald's magical delivery". Takiff criticized producer Phil Ramone's "creamy smooth production [which] buffed away all the edges". The album received a 4 star review in The Evening Standard, which wrote that the album was "remarkably all-star" and it was a "jazz fact that you have to expire if you want to be marketed properly".

Rashod Ollison in The Baltimore Sun and Jeff Simon In The Buffalo News both highlighted Ledisi's "Blues in the Night" and Nikki Yanofsky's scat singing on "Airmail Special". Simon praised Yanofsky's "phenomenal channelling" of Fitzgerald and Ollison felt her performance was "mouth-dropping". Simon also wrote the album had "some surprises, even shocks".

== Track listing ==
No.	Title	Writer(s)	Vocal artist(s) and instrumentalists	Length
1.	"A-Tisket, A-Tasket"	Van Alexander, Ella Fitzgerald	Natalie Cole with Terry Trotter, piano
2.	"Lullaby of Birdland"	George Shearing, George David Weiss	Chaka Khan with Tony Kadleck, trumpet
3.	"The Lady Is a Tramp"	Richard Rodgers, Lorenz Hart	Queen Latifah
4.	"Dream a Little Dream of Me"	Fabian Andre, Gus Kahn, Wilbur Schwandt	Diana Krall with Hank Jones, both on piano
5.	"(If You Can't Sing It) You'll Have to Swing It (Mr. Paganini)"	Sam Coslow	Natalie Cole and Chaka Khan
6.	"Oh, Lady Be Good!"	George Gershwin, Ira Gershwin	Dianne Reeves
7.	"Reaching for the Moon"	Irving Berlin	Lizz Wright with Regina Carter, violin, and Russell Malone, guitar
8.	"Blues in the Night"	Harold Arlen, Johnny Mercer	Ledisi
9.	"Miss Otis Regrets"	Cole Porter	Linda Ronstadt
10.	"Someone to Watch over Me"	G. Gershwin, I. Gershwin	Gladys Knight
11.	"Do Nothing Till You Hear from Me"	Duke Ellington, Bob Russell	Etta James
12.	"Angel Eyes"	Earl Brent, Matt Dennis	k.d. lang with Tom Scott, tenor saxophone
13.	"Too Close for Comfort"	Jerry Bock, George David Weiss, Larry Holofcener	Michael Bublé
14.	"You Are the Sunshine of My Life"	Stevie Wonder	Stevie Wonder and Ella Fitzgerald (recorded live in New Orleans, 1977)
15.	"Airmail Special"	Charlie Christian, Benny Goodman, Jimmy Mundy	Nikki Yanofsky

== Production and arrangement credits ==
- Orchestra on tracks # 1–8, 11 and 12 was arranged and conducted by Rob Mounsey;
- "Someone to Watch over Me" - arranged and conducted by Billy Childs;
- "Too Close for Comfort" - arranged by Billy Childs and conducted by Rob Mounsey;
- "Miss Otis Regrets" - sung by Linda Ronstadt with string trio and piano arranged by pianist Alan Broadbent, and produced, recorded and mixed by George Massenburg and co-produced by John Boylan.
- "Airmail Special" - was arranged for a jazz quintet and conducted by double bassist John Clayton and produced by Tommy LiPuma.
- On tracks # 5, 6, 12 and 13 a string section is added to the big band.
- The Australian edition of the album added another bonus track, an interpretation of "Cotton Tail" sung by Dee Dee Bridgewater taken from her own tribute album Dear Ella (Verve, 1997).
