= Pinky Winters =

American jazz singer (1931–2026)

- Born: Phyllis Wozniak; February 1, 1931; Michigan City, Indiana, U.S.
- Died: May 18, 2026 (aged 95)
- Occupation: Singer
- Spouses: Jim Wolf; Bob Hardaway
- Children: 2

Phyllis Mary Hardaway (née Wozniak; February 1, 1931 – May 18, 2026), better known by the stage name Pinky Winters, was an American jazz singer with an on-and-off career span of over 80 years. She recorded several albums during the 1950s and 1960s as well as later in the 1980s.

== Early life and career ==
Phyllis Mary Wozniak was born in Michigan City, Indiana on February 1, 1931. She took piano lessons from the age of four and was performing solo in a local concert within a year. She later performed at venues across the Indiana region. Regarding her singing style, her main influences were Frank Sinatra (who she listened to as a child on vinyl records), as well as others such as the Andrews Sisters, Dinah Shore, Ella Fitzgerald and Sarah Vaughan. Winters later moved with Dick Grove to Denver, Colorado, where she sang and played the piano in clubs, at this time acquiring the stage name of Pinky Winters. In 1953, Winters and Groves moved to California, performing in venues such as the Starlight night club in Los Angeles. At a gig one night in Santa Monica, Anita O’Day, who had a regular singing spot and who was going to be out of town for two weeks, gave her spot to Winters who found herself performing with players such as pianist Hampton Hawes and bass player Red Mitchell. From the mid to late 1950s, Winters worked in many clubs in the area and released several jazz albums on which she was accompanied by top musicians in the LA jazz scene, including Zoot Sims, Lou Levy, Gerald Wiggins, Howard Roberts and Chico Hamilton. After getting married and having a daughter, Winters took a hiatus from performing for over a decade while she focused on raising her family. She returned to performing afterwards, recording and touring after her second divorce from ex-husband Hardaway. In 1982, Winters began a partnership with Lou Levy, an accompanist who had worked with Peggy Lee and Ella Fitzgerald.

From an on-and-off four decade career, Winters became known for her intimate and informal singing style, with what the jazz expert Doug Ramsey describes as "impeccable diction, interpretation, time and phrasing". The inventive singing on her albums is now highly prized.

She toured in the Netherlands (1994), in Indonesia and in 2016 in Japan, with veteran pianist Kiyoshi Morita. Four or five of her records were released in Japan. Winters was still in demand as a performer. During the pandemic lockdowns however, she self-isolated and did not sing publicly. In an interview in September 2021, on the "West Coast Jazz Hour # 41 with Pinky Winters", then over 90 years old, Winters stated that she felt she had one more album in her.

== Personal life and death ==
Winters' first husband was bassist Jim Wolf with whom she performed in Los Angeles. They had a daughter together but divorced in the late 1950s. Winters' second husband was Bob Hardaway with whom she had a second daughter. She had a long professional and personal relationship with accompanist Lou Levy who died in 2001.

Winters died on May 18, 2026, at the age of 95.

== Discography ==
- Pinky (Vantage Records 1954)
- Pinky & Zoot (Vantaga, 1954)
- Lonely One (Argo Records, 1958)
- The Shadow of Your Smile – (Pinky Winters Sings Johnny Mandel) (Cellar Door, 1983)
- Speak Low (Cellar Door, 1983)
- Let’s Be Buddies (Jacqueline, 1985)
- As Long as There’s Music (Koch Jazz 1994)
- This Happy Madness (Verve 1994)
- Rain Sometimes (2001)
- World on a String: Pinky Winters Sings Sinatra – Live in Tokyo (SSJ, 2007)
- Winters in Summer (SSJ 2010)
