= Sonny Stitt Blows the Blues =

Studio album by Sonny Stitt
- Released: 1960
- Recorded: December 21–22, 1959; Los Angeles, California
- Genre: Jazz
- Length: 36:41
- Label: Verve; MG V-8374

Sonny Stitt chronology
| Sonny Stitt Sits in with the Oscar Peterson Trio (1959) | Sonny Stitt Blows the Blues (1960) | Saxophone Supremacy (1959) |

Professional ratings
Review scores
| Source | Rating |
|---|---|
| Allmusic | 4/5 stars |

Sonny Stitt Blows the Blues is an album by saxophonist Sonny Stitt recorded in late 1959 and released on the Verve label.

== Reception ==
The Allmusic site awarded the album 4 stars stating "Sonny Stitt led a number of excellent record dates in 1959, especially at the end of the year... Playing alto sax throughout this album, Stitt hardly sounds like a Charlie Parker clone, something that unfortunately was a frequent claim by tin-eared critics throughout a fair portion of his career".

== Track listing ==
All compositions by Sonny Stitt except as indicated

1. "Blue Devil Blues" - 4:28
2. "Home Free Blues" - 4:23
3. "Blue Prelude" - 3:07
4. "Frankie and Johnny" (Hughie Cannon) - 5:31
5. "The Birth of the Blues" (Ray Henderson, Buddy DeSylva, Lew Brown) - 5:57
6. "A Blues Offering" - 4:06
7. "Hymnal Blues" - 6:10
8. "Morning After Blues" - 2:59
- Recorded in Los Angeles, California on December 21 (tracks 1 & 6) and December 22 (tracks 2–5, 7 & 8), 1959

== Personnel ==
- Sonny Stitt - alto saxophone
- Lou Levy - piano
- Leroy Vinnegar - bass
- Mel Lewis - drums

Technical

- Merle Shore - art direction
- Phil Stern - cover photography
