= Neo (nightclub) =

Nightclub in Chicago, Illinois, United States

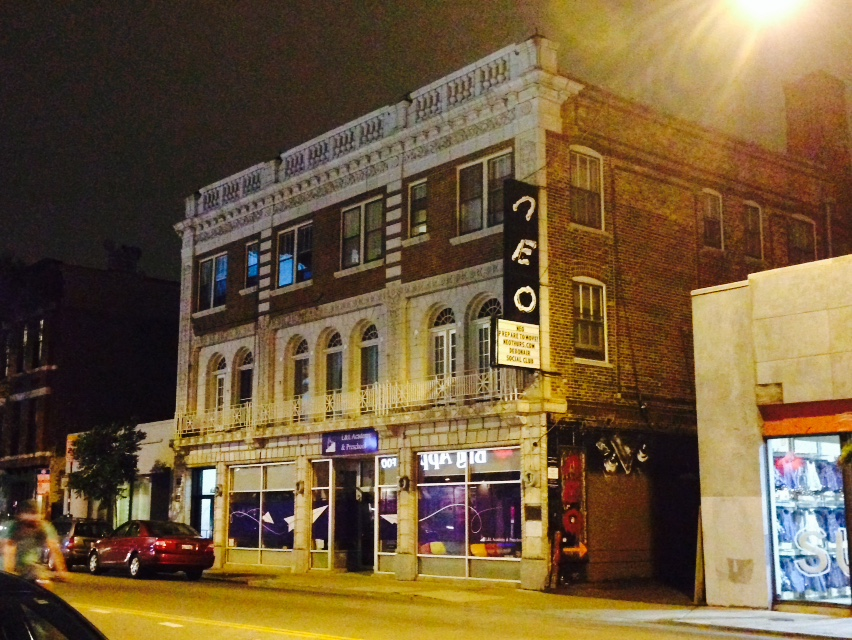
- Interactive map of Neo
- Address: 2350 N. Clark St. (Original); 1575 N Milwaukee Ave (Current)
- Location: Chicago, Illinois
- Coordinates: 41°54′36.7″N 87°40′36.5″W
- Type: Nightclub

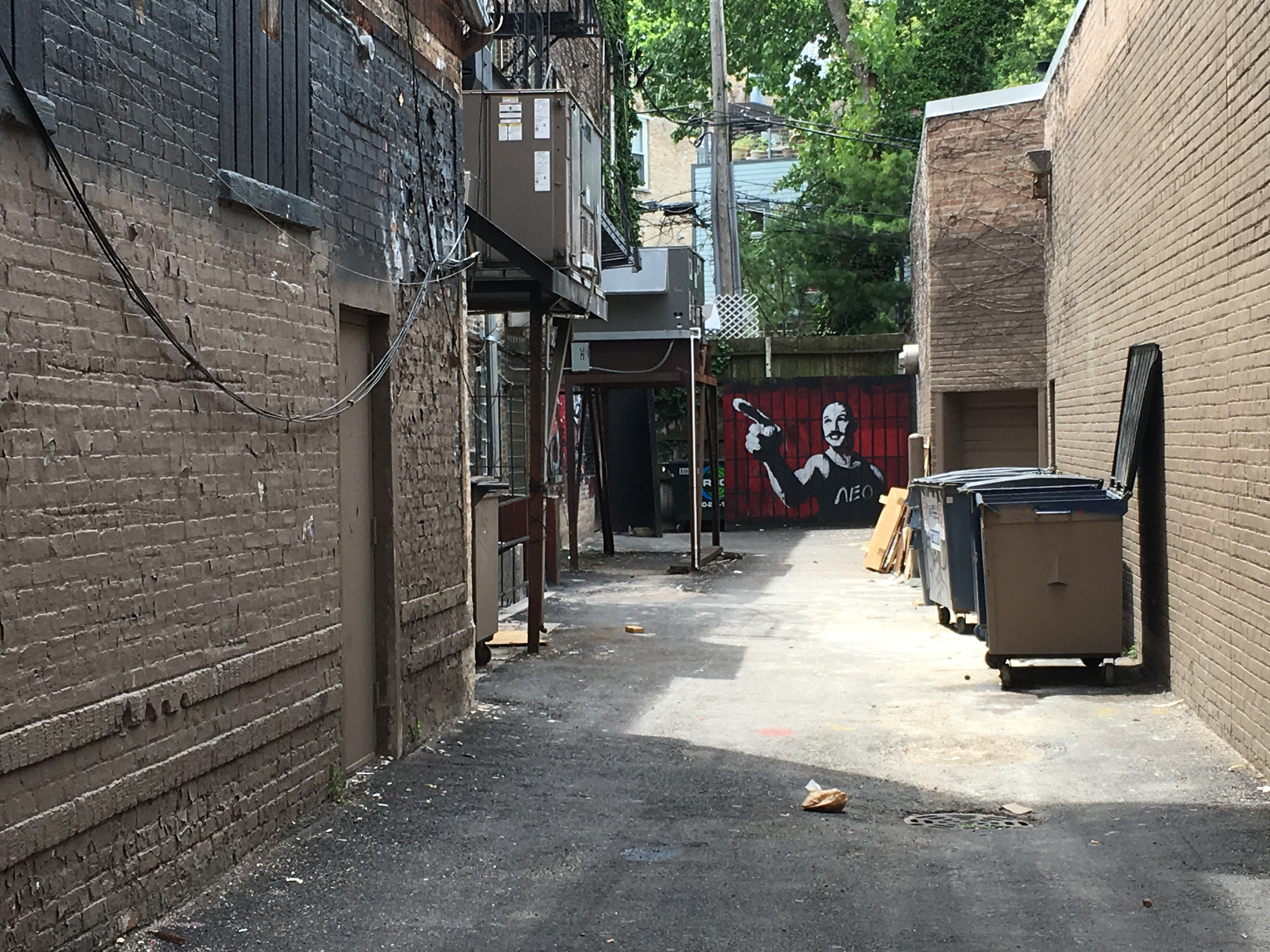
Alley entrance

Neo was a nightclub located at 2350 N. Clark St. in the Chicago neighborhood of Lincoln Park. Established on July 25, 1979 Neo was the oldest or one of the oldest running nightclubs in Chicago and was a hangout and venue for a variety of musicians and artists, including David Bowie, Iggy Pop, David Byrne, the Clash, Siouxsie and the Banshees, and U2. The nightclub has been noted for being gay-friendly as well as part of goth subculture. Sources differ as to whether or not the character Neo from The Matrix franchise drew inspiration from the nightclub and its patrons.

== History ==
In the 1980s the club was a center for Chicago's Punk and New Wave scenes. In 1988, on the advice of one of the bartenders employed by Neo's management, the bar was renovated to look like lower Wacker.

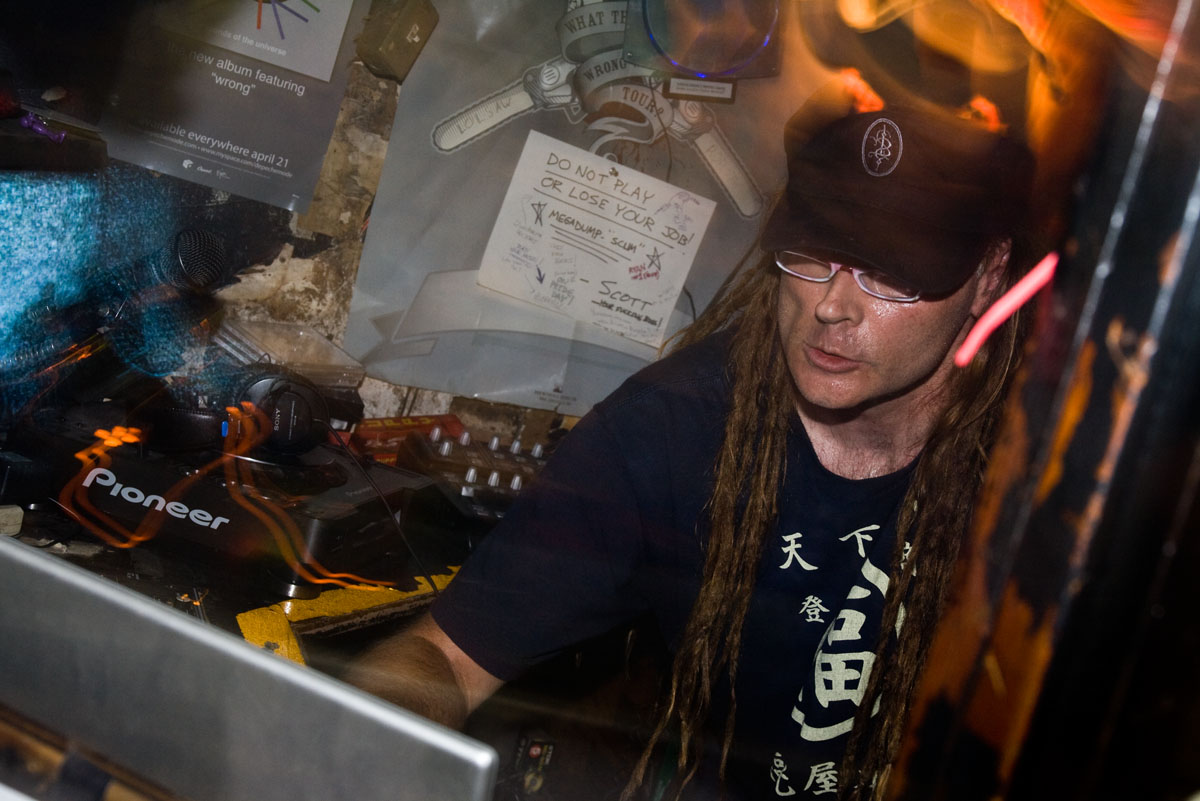
a DJ at the club in 2009

In 2009, Neo celebrated its 30th anniversary and was Chicago's oldest nightclub.

In 2015, the nightclub lost its lease and had to move to a new location. Beginning in 2017, the club was located inside the Debonair Social Club at 1575 N Milwaukee Avenue at Chicago, however the club closed in September 2023.

== See also ==
- Mister Kelly's
