= Saxophone Supremacy =

Studio album by The Sonny Stitt Quartet
- Released: 1961
- Recorded: December 21 & 23, 1959
- Studio: Radio Recorders Studio, Los Angeles, California
- Genre: Jazz
- Label: Verve; MG V-8377

Sonny Stitt chronology
| Sonny Stitt Blows the Blues (1959) | Saxophone Supremacy (1961) | Sonny Stitt Swings the Most (1959) |

Saxophone Supremacy is an album by saxophonist Sonny Stitt recorded in 1959 and released on the Verve label.

== Reception ==
Professional ratings
Review scores
| Source | Rating |
|---|---|
| DownBeat | 4/5 stars |
| AllMusic | 4/5 stars |

Ken Dryden for AllMusic stated, "Sonny Stitt had a difficult time coming out from under the shadow of Charlie Parker, even though Stitt's approach to playing the alto sax was only partially similar to the late giant".

== Track listing ==
All compositions by Sonny Stitt, except as indicated.

1. "I Cover The Waterfront" (Edward Heyman, Johnny Green) - 3:14
2. "Lazy Bones" (Hoagy Carmichael, Johnny Mercer) - 7:41
3. "Sunday" (Chester Conn, Benny Krueger) - 3:54
4. "Just Friends" (John Klenner, Sam M. Lewis) - 3:48
5. "All Of Me" (Gerald Marks, Seymour Simons) - 3:02
6. "Two Bad Days Blues" - 4:43
7. "It's You Or No One" (Jule Styne, Sammy Cahn) - 4:31
8. "Blue Smile" - 4:00
- Recorded in Los Angeles, California on December 21 (track 6 & 8) and December 23 (tracks 1–5 & 7), 1959

== Personnel ==
- Sonny Stitt - alto saxophone
- Lou Levy - piano
- Leroy Vinnegar - bass
- Mel Lewis - drums
