= Sonny Stitt Swings the Most =

Studio album by Sonny Stitt
- Released: 1960
- Recorded: February 9 and December 21 & 23, 1959; New York City and Radio Recorder Studio in Los Angeles, California
- Genre: Jazz
- Label: Verve; MG V-8380

Sonny Stitt chronology
Saxophone Supremacy (1959)	Sonny Stitt Swings the Most (1960)	Sonny Stitt - Previously Unreleased Recordings (1960)

Professional ratings
Review scores
Source	Rating
Allmusic	3/5 stars

Sonny Stitt Swings the Most is an album by saxophonist Sonny Stitt recorded in 1959 and released on the Verve label.

== Reception ==
The Allmusic site awarded the album 3 stars.

== Track listing ==
All compositions by Sonny Stitt except as indicated

1. "Lonesome Road" (Nathaniel Shilkret, Gene Austin) - 4:04
2. "The Gypsy" (Billy Reid) - 4:03
3. "That's The Way To Be" - 2:08
4. "There Is No Greater Love" (Isham Jones, Marty Symes) - 5:02
5. "Jaunty" - 5:11
6. "Blue Sunday" - 3:24
7. "The Way You Look Tonight" (Dorothy Fields, Jerome Kern) - 5:02
- Recorded in New York City on February 9 (tracks 3 & 7) and in Los Angeles, California on December 21 (track 6) and December 23 (tracks 1, 2, 4 & 5), 1959

== Personnel ==
- Sonny Stitt - alto saxophone, tenor saxophone (track 7), vocals (track 3)
- Lou Levy (tracks 1, 2 & 4–6), Amos Trice (tracks 3 & 7) - piano
- Leroy Vinnegar (tracks 1, 2 & 4–6), George Morrow (tracks 3 & 7) - bass
- Mel Lewis (tracks 1, 2 & 4–6), Lenny McBrowne (tracks 3 & 7) - drums
