= Mister Kelly's =

Defunct American nightclub in Chicago

Coordinates: 41.9014°N 87.6280°W

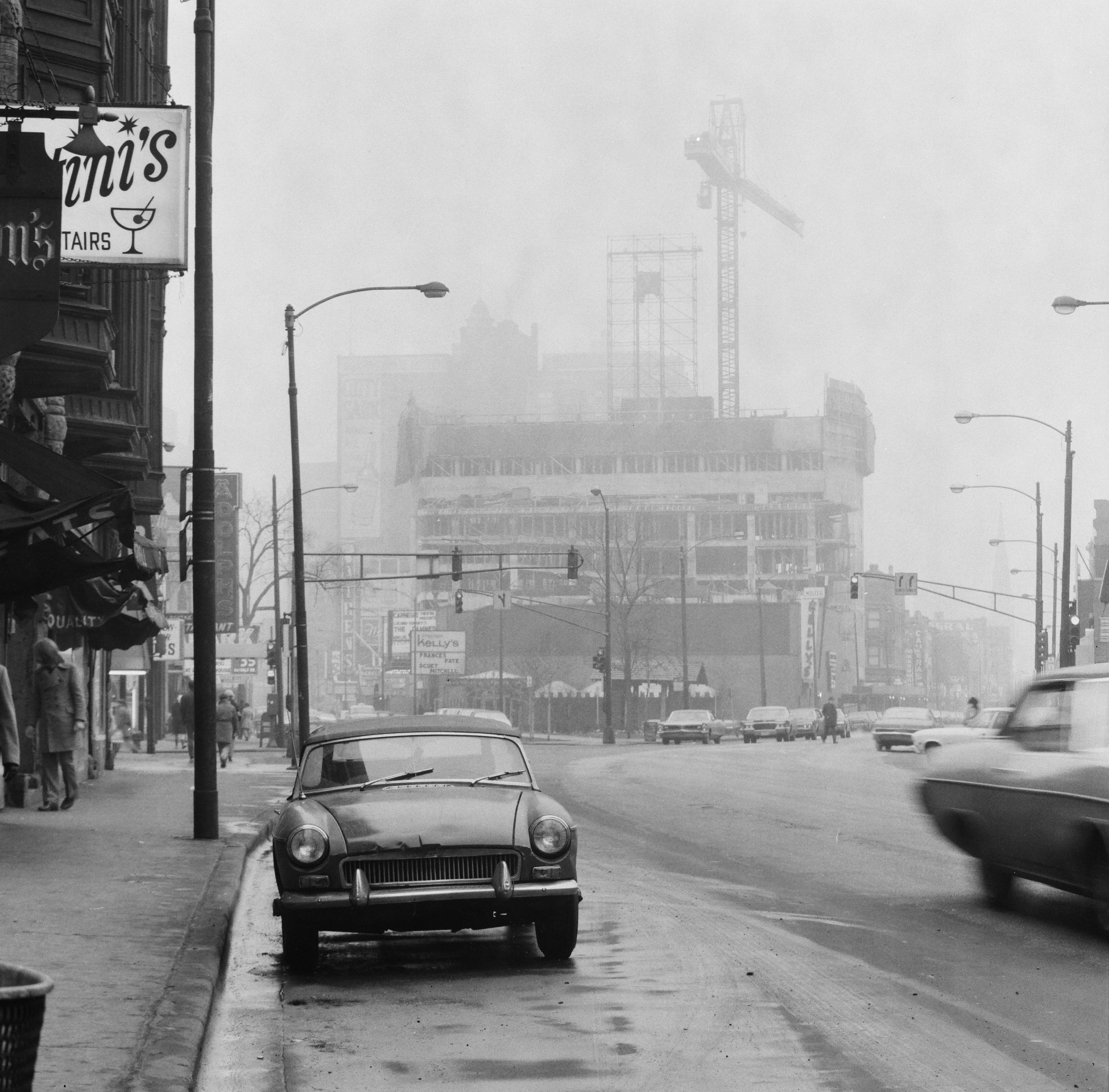
Mister Kelly's, signage visible in the lower center

Mister Kelly's was a nightclub on Rush Street in Chicago which existed from 1953 to 1975. From around 1956 until its demise, it was a springboard to fame for many entertainers, especially jazz singers and comedians. As reported in the Chicago Tribune, "It was a supernova in the local and national nightlife firmament." Mister Kelly's was owned and operated by brothers Oscar and George Marienthal, whose Chicago empire included the London House, an upscale jazz supper club, and the theatrically oriented Happy Medium.

== Early days ==
Mister Kelly's opened on November 24, 1953, on Rush Street in Chicago as a restaurant featuring steaks and Green Goddess salad as a house special. In 1954, entertainment was added with two singer-pianists, Buddy Charles and Audrey Morris, as the first entertainers.

The nightclub was destroyed on December 8, 1955, when a fire started in a grease chute and spread through a ventilator into the club.^{2} Mister Kelly's was rebuilt and reopened on August 29, 1956 with a new policy of standup singers. Previously the nightclub specialized in singers who played their own accompaniment. Recording star Jeri Southern was one of the first standup singers to appear. The club also had a completely new décor but retained an original Mister Kelly's feature, stairways which went nowhere for casual enthusiasts who simply wanted to sit and watch the show.^{2} Mr. Kelly's became a springboard to fame for countless entertainers.

In November, 1956, the Marienthal brothers’ nightclubs made their debut on WNBQ Channel 5 (NBC) in Chicago. The new color television show was entitled Here’s Music – At London House and Mister Kelly's. The set duplicated the décor and many of the appointments of Mister Kelly's as an authentic supper club setting for the show. Entertainers appearing at Mr. Kelly's begin to record albums at the nightclub. By 1958, Ella Fitzgerald, Peggy King, Della Reese, Buddy Greco, Anita O'Day, Sarah Vaughn and comedian Mort Sahl had recorded there.

== Middle years ==
In 1959, Mister Kelly's instituted a new entertainment policy, which combined a musical act with a comedy act. This combination remained the club's format for the next 16 years. New talent and established entertainers were featured. For example, in April, 1960 comedian Bob Newhart, and songstress Janice Halpern were featured. In 1963, Oscar Marienthal discovered a young singer at a small New York nightclub and booked her several months before she was to appear. Oscar died suddenly at the age of 50 before that new talent, 20-year-old Barbra Streisand, made her debut at Mister Kelly's on June 11, 1963.

Other entertainers who played the club early in their careers included Woody Allen, Lenny Bruce, Flip Wilson, Bill Cosby, George Carlin, Richard Pryor, Shelley Berman, Nancy Wilson, Shecky Greene, Jackie Vernon, Jackie Mason, Eartha Kitt, Joan Rivers, Mike Nichols and Elaine May, Aretha Franklin, Liza Minnelli, Barbra Streisand and Bob Newhart. Established stars, too, such as Ella Fitzgerald, the Kingston Trio, Peggy Lee, Lena Horne and Billie Holiday headlined at the club.

On the night of February 8, 1966, about 200 patrons fled Mister Kelly's as fire engulfed an entire block on Rush Street in Chicago. It had begun in a drugstore, swept through the buildings and completely destroyed Mister Kelly's. The club reopened on May 15, 1967. It was rebuilt on its original site and redesigned to increase seating capacity at tables from 165 to 180 seats. The old stairways now known as "bleachers" were reinstalled with cushions and additional seating space. The bleachers continued to be a no-minimum, no-cover area where a customer could see and hear the show for a price for a drink or two. Among the stars who returned to perform were Woody Allen and Mort Sahl, for whom the initial appearance at Mister Kelly's became a stepping stone to their star status.

== Post-acquisition ==
In 1969, Mister Kelly's was sold to Arts and Leisure Corp., entertainment division, and things began to change. In 1971, Paul Wimmer bought Mister Kelly's from Art's and Leisure and he and his managing partner, Jerry Dambra instituted new policies that were more informal; the maître d' wore a casual suit instead of a tuxedo. Young entertainment was featured with a low-price package deal. In July, due to financial problems, the club closed on August 25, 1975. Its demise was not sudden. Security issues, late-night TV, and the emergence of Las Vegas style venues that could afford to pay the performers more money, took its toll, and top talent commanded top fees to appear there. This required a high volume of patrons, but Mister Kelly's had fewer than 200 seats, including the "bleachers." Comedian and actor Tim Reid states that he was the last comedian to appear as Mister Kelly's on New Year's Eve in 1975, exactly seven years after he and his wife were fortunate enough to see Richard Pryor there also on New Year's Eve in 1968. Jerry Dambra famously said, "I was a lucky man to have closed the two greatest clubs in the world."

== Legacy ==
In 2021, a documentary titled Live at Mister Kelly's, directed by Ted Bogosian and narrated by Bill Kurtis, was released as a streaming feature. Film reviewer Peter Sobcynzkski called it "fascinating," noting that it showed "how Mister Kelly's not only transformed from a nightclub into a institution, but helped to make the corner of Rush and Bellevue into arguably the epicenter of American popular culture during its heyday."

In 2024, the Newberry Library in Chicago mounted an exhibit entitled "A Night at Mister Kelly's," curated by Alison Hinderliter, Lloyd Lewis Curator of Modern Manuscripts and Selector for Modern Music, Newberry Library. In addition to the exhibit scheduled to run March 21 to July 20, 2024, the Newberry offered a related series of public programs, adult education courses, and screenings of Live at Mister Kelly's.

== Recordings at Mister Kelly’s ==
- 1955 – Buddy Greco: At Mister Kelly’s
- 1957 – Sarah Vaughan: At Mister Kelly's
- 1958 – Della Reese: At Mister Kelly’s
- 1958 – Ella Fitzgerald: Live at Mister Kelly's
- 1958 – Anita O'Day: At Mister Kelly's
- 1960 – Ruth Olay: In Person
- 1960 – Mort Sahl: The Next President
- 1963 – The Smothers Brothers: Curb Your Tongue, Knave!
- 1964 – Woody Allen: Woody Allen
- 1964 – Bill Cosby: I Started Out as a Child
- 1968 – Flip Wilson: You Devil You
- 1971 – Muddy Waters: "Live" (At Mr. Kelly’s)
- 1974 – Cass Elliot: Don't Call Me Mama Anymore
- 1975 – Freddie Prinze: Looking Good

== Notable performers ==
Among the notables who performed at Mister Kelly's were Ella Fitzgerald, Lena Horne, Peggy Lee, Sarah Vaughan, Duke Ellington, Billie Holiday, Ramsey Lewis, Barbra Streisand, Julie London, Anita O'Day, Abbey Lincoln, Lou Rawls, Eartha Kitt, Oscar Peterson, Liza Minnelli, Dionne Warwick, Herbie Hancock, Chick Corea, Nancy Wilson, Carmen McRae, Muddy Waters, Nina Simone, Dinah Washington, Morgana King, Rufus with Chaka Khan, Lainie Kazan, Carmen McRae, Rod McKuen, Buddy Greco, Bette Midler, B.B. King, Carly Simon, Phoebe Snow, The Mamas & the Papas, Blood, Sweat and Tears, Curtis Mayfield, Bill Withers, Donny Hathaway, Melissa Manchester, Mel Torme, Oliver, Barry Manilow, Spanky and Our Gang, and Captain and Tennille. Comedians who also performed at Mister Kelly's included the likes of Shecky Greene, Lenny Bruce, Mort Sahl, Woody Allen, Richard Pryor, Joan Rivers, Bill Cosby, George Carlin, The Smothers Brothers, Freddie Prinze, Robert Klein, Mike Nichols and Elaine May, Flip Wilson, Tim and Tom, Redd Foxx, Phyllis Diller, Bob Newhart, Jackie Mason, Fred Willard, Don Adams, Jack E. Leonard, Ace Trucking Co., Steve Martin, Dick Cavett, Marilyn Michaels, Totie Fields, Godfrey Cambridge, Tim Reid and Tom Dreesen, Lily Tomlin and Dick Gregory. Musical directors at the club included Dick Marx, Marty Rubenstein and Larry Novak.

=== Live albums ===
- Sarah Vaughan – At Mister Kelly's (1958)
- Anita O'Day – Anita O'Day at Mister Kelly's (1958)
- Woody Allen – Woody Allen (1964)
- Bill Cosby – I Started Out as a Child (1964)
- Muddy Waters – Live at Mr. Kelly's (1971)
- Cass Elliot – Don't Call Me Mama Anymore (1973)
- Ella Fitzgerald – Ella Fitzgerald Live at Mister Kelly's (2007)

== See also ==
- Neo (nightclub)
