= Runnin' Wild (1922 song) =

- Sheet music of "Runnin' Wild"

Single by Original Memphis Five
- Released: 1922
- Recorded: 1922
- Label: Regal Records
- Composer: Arthur Harrington Gibbs
- Lyricists: Joe Grey and Leo Wood

Audio sample
- Recording of Runnin' Wild, performed by the Ted Lewis Jazz Band (1922): file; help

"Runnin' Wild" is a popular song first composed and recorded in 1922, written by Arthur Harrington Gibbs with lyrics by Joe Grey and Leo Wood.

== Notable recordings ==
- Original Memphis Five, recorded in December 1922 for Regal Records (catalog No. 9407A).
- Isabella Patricola with The Virginians, recorded in December 27, 1922 for Victor Records (catalog No. 19027B).
- Nora Bayes - recorded for Columbia Records (catalog No. A3826) on January 11, 1923.
- Ted Lewis - a popular recording in 1922-23.
- Django Reinhardt Quintette - a gypsy swing version in 1928
- Duke Ellington and His Orchestra, recorded October 17, 1930 for Brunswick Records (catalog No. E34927).
- Jimmie Lunceford and His Orchestra, recorded on May 29, 1935 for Decca Records (catalog No. 503B).
- Benny Goodman Quartet, recorded February 5, 1937 for Victor Records (25529A).
- Glenn Miller and His Orchestra (1939).
- Ted Weems and His Orchestra, recorded for Decca Records (3135A) on October 4, 1939.
- Teddy Wilson Quintet, recorded January 15, 1945 for Musicraft Records (catalog No. 319).
- The Chordettes - A single release in 1951.
- Firehouse Five Plus Two - for their album Firehouse Five Plus Two Volume 4 (1952).
- Joyce Bryant released a version of the song in 1954. It also served as the title of her album.
- Ella Fitzgerald - A swing version is included on the 1962 Verve recording: Ella Fitzgerald: Rhythm Is My Business, with a fabulous big band arrangement by Bill Doggett.
- The Temperance Seven - a single release in 1962 (7" Parlophone R4934).
- The New Paul Whiteman Orchestra - for their album The New Paul Whiteman Orchestra (1975).
- Boston Pops Orchestra CD Runnin' Wild: The Boston Pops Orchestra Plays Glenn Miller (1986). This was Keith Lockhart's first CD with the Boston Pops as their 20th Conductor.

== In popular culture ==
It is probably best known for its inclusion in the classic 1959 comedy film Some Like It Hot, set in the late prohibition era. The song is performed during a rehearsal on a train journey, with Marilyn Monroe providing the vocals.
