= Sterno Records =

Sterno Records was a United Kingdom based record company issuing gramophone records from 1926 through 1935. The label was a subsidiary of Homophone Records.

== See also ==
- Lists of record labels
