= Mike Riley (musician) =

American jazz musician

- Born: January 5, 1904
- Died: September 2, 1984 (aged 80) Redondo Beach, California, U.S.
- Genres: Jazz
- Instruments: Trombone

Mike Riley (January 5, 1904 – September 2, 1984) was an American jazz trombonist and songwriter. He is best known for co-writing the 1935 song "The Music Goes Round and Round", one of the biggest hits of that year.

== Career ==
Riley played both trumpet and trombone, and by 1927 was working in New York City, playing trumpet in Jimmy Durante's band at the Parody Club. He soon found work in several local bands as a trombonist, then co-led an ensemble with Eddie Farley, with whom he held a regular gig at the Onyx Club and wrote several songs including "The Music Goes Round and Round". He worked in New York and regionally through the 1940s, then worked in Chicago in the 1950s. Riley led a band which toured North America later in the 1950s and 1960s.

== Personal life ==
He died in Redondo Beach, California, in 1984.
