= Previously Unreleased Recordings =

Studio album by Sonny Stitt
- Released: 1973
- Recorded: June 20, 1960; Los Angeles, California
- Genre: Jazz
- Label: Verve; V6-8837
- Producer: Creed Taylor

Sonny Stitt chronology
Stittsville (1960)	Previously Unreleased Recordings (1973)	Sonny Side Up (1960)

Previously Unreleased Recordings is an album by saxophonist Sonny Stitt featuring compositions associated with Duke Ellington which was originally recorded in 1960 and released on the Verve label in 1973. On CD it can be found on Import as part of Rearin' Back / Tribute To Duke Ellington

== Reception ==
Professional ratings
Review scores
Source	Rating
Allmusic	3/5 stars

Scott Yanow of Allmusic stated, "the results are typically swinging bop if not overly memorable. Stitt fans will want this one anyway".

== Track listing ==
1. "It Don't Mean a Thing (If It Ain't Got That Swing)" (Duke Ellington, Irving Mills) - 5:15
2. "I'm Beginning to See the Light" (Ellington, Don George, Johnny Hodges, Harry James) - 7:00
3. "Perdido" (Ervin Drake, Hans Lengsfelder, Juan Tizol) - 5:40
4. "Sophisticated Lady" (Ellington, Mills, Mitchell Parish) - 2:02
5. "Don't Get Around Much Anymore" (Ellington, Bob Russell) - 4:33
6. "I Let a Song Go Out of My Heart" (Ellington, Mills, Henry Nemo, John Redmond) - 4:06
7. "Do Nothin' Till You Hear from Me" (Ellington, Russell) - 4:58
8. "C Jam Blues" (Ellington) - 4:27
9. "Solitude" (Eddie DeLange, Ellington, Mills) - 5:22

== Personnel ==
- Sonny Stitt - alto saxophone, tenor saxophone tracks 1,7 and 8
- Lou Levy - piano
- Paul Chambers - bass
- Stan Levey - drums
