= Katica Illényi =

Hungarian violinist

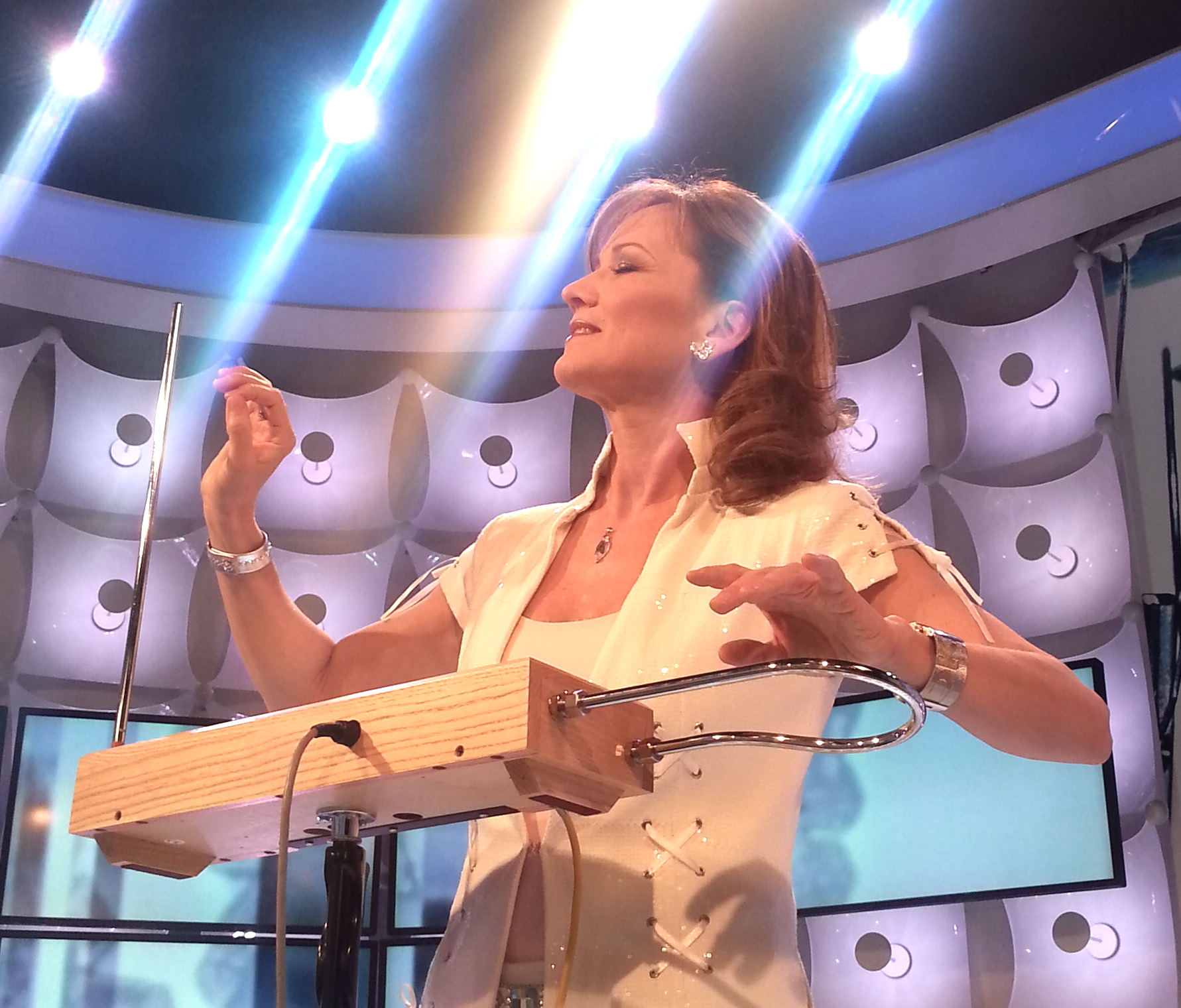
- Katica Illényi playing the theremin

Background information
- Born: 17 February 1968 (age 58); Budapest
- Origin: Hungary
- Instruments: Violin, theremin, vocals
- Years active: 1991-present
- Labels: EMI Music, IKP Music
- Website: https://www.katicaillenyi.com/

Katica Illényi (Hungarian: [ˈkɒtit͡sɒ ˈilleːɲi]) is a Hungarian violinist, singer, dancer and theremin player. She has classical training, and plays in several musical genres including folk music, klezmer and Manouche jazz.

== Life and career ==
Illényi comes from a musical family. She was raised in Budapest, Hungary and began learning the violin with her father, Ferenc Illényi, who played in the orchestra of the Hungarian State Opera. Her older brother (also Ferenc) is a violinist with the Houston Symphony, her younger brother Csaba is a violin graduate of the Vienna Academy of Music, and her sister Aniko is a cellist with the Stadtorchester Winterthur in Switzerland. Illenyi attended the Franz Liszt Academy of Music in Budapest, after which she broadened her repertoire to include classical, jazz, and world music.

In 2002 Illenyi embarked on a solo stage career performing concerts containing eclectic programs of classical, jazz, and movie soundtrack themes. In 2014 she began public performances with the Theremin, which she has continued to include in many of her concerts.

Illenyi has received international accolades, performing at concerts organized in cooperation with the Embassies of Hungary in several countries. In 2010 she organized a family reunion concert with her brothers and sister at the Bela Bartok National Concert Hall, Palace of Arts Budapest.

== Awards ==
Hungary's Outstanding Artist - 15 March 2020

Artist of Merit of Hungary - 15 March 2015

Franz Liszt Award - 15th March 2014

Artisjus Award 2010

eMeRTon Award 2002

== Discography ==
2019. Jubilee Concert - Budapest Congress Center

2018. Tango Classic, Celebration Hall of Vigadó

2017. Katica Illényi & Friends Budapest Congress Center

2016. New Year Concert at Royal Ballroom with Budapest Strings

2016. Theremin Christmas

2015. Around the world in 80 days

2014. Live in Budapest

2014. The Stephane Grappelli Tribute

2014. Live at the Thalia Theatre

2013. Reloaded Jazzy Violin

2013. World Famous Movie Songs and Evergreens

2012. Around the world with a violin

2012. Classic violin

2012. Katica Illényi and her Siblings at the Palace of Art sin Budapest

2010. Songs of Love

2008. The Jazzy Violin

2007. Concert at the Liszt Ferenc Academy of Music

2006. Live at the Palace of Arts Budapest

2005. Honeysuckle rose

2002. Premier
