= Across the Alley from the Alamo =

1946 jazz standard

"Across the Alley from the Alamo" is a song written in 1946 by Joe Greene, which has become a jazz standard. Greene's whimsical lyrics (reputed to have been inspired by a dream), concern a Navajo Indian and his pinto pony. The pair have an easygoing life until they take a walking vacation along a railroad track and are never seen again.

The Mills Brothers' recording of the song scored #2 on the U.S. Billboard chart in 1947; there were cover versions that same year by Woody Herman and his Orchestra, and by Stan Kenton and his Orchestra with vocalist June Christy.

The Mills Brothers re-recorded it for their 1958 album The Mills Bros. – Great Hits. It also features on albums such as Ella Fitzgerald's Live at Mister Kelly's (1958) and Patti Austin's The Real Me (1988). It was recorded by The Three Suns, 1947, RCA Victor 20-2272-B. It was also recorded by The Skyrockets Orchestra with vocalist Dick James in 1948, by The Holy Modal Rounders on their 1975 album Alleged in Their Own Time, by Bob Wills and the Texas Playboys in 1968 and Asleep at the Wheel in 1985.

This song can be heard in the 2021 film Don't Look Up featuring Leonardo DiCaprio and Jennifer Lawrence. It is playing in the background during the scene when they are eating their last meal with family and friends.
