= (If You Can't Sing It) You'll Have to Swing It (Mr. Paganini) =

Song written by Sam Coslow

Song by Ella Fitzgerald
- Recorded: 1936
- Genre: Jazz, swing
- Songwriter: Sam Coslow

"(If You Can't Sing It) You'll Have to Swing It (Mr. Paganini)" is a song written by Sam Coslow for Rhythm on the Range that is strongly associated with Ella Fitzgerald.

It was first recorded by Fitzgerald on 29 October 1936 and became one of her signature songs. It was a firm fixture of her live performances, providing a springboard for her scat singing.

The song was intended as a satire on Arturo Toscanini.

On the 2007 tribute album We All Love Ella: Celebrating the First Lady of Song recorded to mark Fitzgerald's 90th birthday, it was performed by Chaka Khan and Natalie Cole. Cole and Patti Austin performed the song at the tribute concert to Fitzgerald on June 6, 2007.

== Recordings ==
- Martha Raye - Rhythm on the Range - film, was not released on record
- Ella Fitzgerald – Jukebox Ella: The Complete Verve Singles, Vol. 1 (2003), Ella in Hollywood (1961), Ella in Budapest, Hungary (1970)
- Dee Dee Bridgewater – Dear Ella (1997)
- Chaka Khan and Natalie Cole – We All Love Ella: Celebrating the First Lady of Song (2007)
- Nikki Yanofsky – "Nikki" (2010)
- Celine Dion – Celine Live in Las Vegas residency 2011 – 2015
- Myrtill Micheller (vocal) and Katica Illényi (violin) - Katica Illényi and Friends, live September 1917, at the Budapest Congress Center, IKP Music, ASIN B075FZG5L
