= At Mister Kelly's =

Live album by Sarah Vaughan
- Released: February 1958
- Recorded: August 6–8, 1957
- Venues: Mister Kelly's, Chicago
- Genre: Vocal jazz
- Length: 35:36
- Label: EmArcy
- Producer: Bob Shad

Sarah Vaughan chronology
In the Land of Hi-Fi (1955)	At Mister Kelly's (1958)	Swingin' Easy (1957)

At Mister Kelly's is a 1957 live album by American jazz singer Sarah Vaughan, recorded at Mister Kelly's jazz club in Chicago.

== Reception ==
Professional ratings
Review scores
Source	Rating
Allmusic	4.5/5 stars
Disc	5/5 stars

The Allmusic review by John Bush awarded the album four-and-a-half stars and said that At Mister Kelly's captures Vaughan at her "best and most relaxed", stating that "her unerring sense of rhythm carries her through every song on this set, whether the occasion calls for playfulness and wit ("Thou Swell," "Honeysuckle Rose") or a world-wise melancholia ("Willow Weep for Me")". Bush also praises Jimmy Jones and Roy Haynes.

== Track listing ==
=== Original release ===
Side one
No.	Title	Writer(s)	Length
1.	"September In The Rain"	Al Dubin, Harry Warren	3:34
2.	"Willow Weep for Me"	Ann Ronell	5:19
3.	"Just One of Those Things"	Cole Porter	3:14
4.	"Be Anything But Darling Be Mine"	Irving Gordon	4:46

Side two
No.	Title	Writer(s)	Length
1.	"Thou Swell"	Lorenz Hart, Richard Rodgers	2:45
2.	"Stairway to the Stars"	Matty Malneck, Mitchell Parish, Frank Signorelli	5:06
3.	"Honeysuckle Rose"	Andy Razaf, Fats Waller	3:37
4.	"Just a Gigolo"	Julius Brammer, Irving Caesar, Leonello Casucci)	4:16
5.	"How High the Moon"	Nancy Hamilton, Morgan Lewis	2:59

=== 1991 Expanded Edition ===
No.	Title	Writer(s)	Length
1.	"September In The Rain"	Al Dubin, Harry Warren	3:34
2.	"Willow Weep for Me"	Ann Ronell	5:19
3.	"Just One of Those Things"	Cole Porter	3:12
4.	"Be Anything But Darling Be Mine"	Irving Gordon	4:49
5.	"Thou Swell"	Lorenz Hart, Richard Rodgers	2:43
6.	"Stairway to the Stars"	Matty Malneck, Mitchell Parish, Frank Signorelli	5:06
7.	"Honeysuckle Rose"	Andy Razaf, Fats Waller	3:37
8.	"Just a Gigolo"	Julius Brammer, Irving Caesar, Leonello Casucci	4:16
9.	"How High the Moon"	Nancy Hamilton, Morgan Lewis	2:59
10.	"Dream"	Johnny Mercer	4:43
11.	"I'm Gonna Sit Right Down (And Write Myself a Letter)"	Fred E. Ahlert, Joe Young	3:13
12.	"It's Got to Be Love"	Rodgers and Hart	2:31
13.	"Alone"	Nacio Herb Brown, Arthur Freed	5:16
14.	"If This Isn't Love"	Yip Harburg, Burton Lane	2:25
15.	"Embraceable You"	George Gershwin, Ira Gershwin	2:46
16.	"Lucky in Love"	Lew Brown, Buddy DeSylva, Ray Henderson	2:10
17.	"Dancing in the Dark"	Howard Dietz, Arthur Schwartz	3:36
18.	"Poor Butterfly"	John Golden, Raymond Hubbell	4:45
19.	"Sometimes I'm Happy"	Irving Caesar, Vincent Youmans	1:59
20.	"I Cover the Waterfront"	Johnny Green, Edward Heyman	4:07

== Personnel ==
- Sarah Vaughan – vocals
- Jimmy Jones – piano
- Richard Davis – double bass
- Roy Haynes – drums
