= Ella in Rome: The Birthday Concert =

Live album by Ella Fitzgerald
- Released: 1988
- Recorded: April 25, 1958 in Rome, Italy
- Genre: Jazz
- Length: 60:48
- Label: Verve
- Producer: Norman Granz

Ella Fitzgerald chronology
Ella Fitzgerald Sings the Irving Berlin Songbook (1958)	Ella in Rome: The Birthday Concert (1988)	Ella Fitzgerald live at Mister Kelly's (2007)

Ella in Rome: The Birthday Concert is a live album by Ella Fitzgerald, with a jazz trio led by Lou Levy, and also featuring the Oscar Peterson trio. Recorded in 1958 at the Teatro Sistina, it was released thirty years later.

== History ==
The album was recorded on Ella's 41st birthday, (though people thought her to be 40 at the time) and considered one of Ella's greatest live recordings, alongside her more famous concert in Berlin two years later (Ella in Berlin), which earned her a Grammy award. In 1993, Fitzgerald's biographer Stuart Nicholson wrote, "Perhaps more than any of her live albums, Ella in Rome is a celebration of the joy of music-making, with Ella’s voice the perfect instrument to express that joy." In "The First Lady of Song: Ella Fitzgerald for the Record", his biography of Ella, Geoffrey Mark Fidelman said that Fitzgerald "was in magnificent voice" and declared that "the entire collection made for the most satisfying of albums." The New York Times declared it "an album that stands beside her songbook collections as a treasure for the ages."

This album's notoriety derives partly from the fact that it was discovered in the vaults of the Verve label in 1988, and released on CD that year; before this, no one had known that this recording had existed.

Pianist Levy attested to that fact, saying, "I didn’t even know they recorded Ella in Rome, I really didn’t. When they put it out and I got a copy of the record, I thought, ‘God! we were swinging our cans off.’ It was just great! So much spirit and drive on it. You could never get it if you went into a studio.” Upon its release in 1988, the album went straight to No. 1 on the Billboard jazz charts.

Ella is at the peak of her vocal talents in the 1958 recording, and a rare event can be witnessed on the last track, "Stompin' at the Savoy", in which Ella invites one of her accompanists to solo. Her inclusion of the WC Handy classic "St. Louis Blues", complete with "sublimely ferocious" scat singing, is in reference to the film of the same name that she had appeared in that year. Of another song on the album, Nicholson wrote, "It is tempting to put the Rome version of "I Loves You Porgy" among the very best Ella Fitzgerald on record," citing it as evidence that Fitzgerald could, indeed, emotionally "internalize" a song.

== Reception ==
Professional ratings
Review scores
Source	Rating
Allmusic	4.5/5 stars
Encyclopedia of Popular Music	4/5 stars
The Penguin Guide to Jazz Recordings	3/4 stars

Writing for Allmusic, music critic Scott Yanow wrote of the album "A top singer for 23 years at that point, she was at the peak of her powers... she puts on her usual show of the period, uplifting the ballads and swinging the faster material."

== Track listing ==
For the 1988 Verve CD album; Verve-PolyGram 835 454-2 (Tracks 12, 13, 15 and 16 were not included on the 12" vinyl album issue)

1. Introduction in Italian by Norman Granz – 0:22
2. "St. Louis Blues" (W.C. Handy) – 5:57
3. "These Foolish Things (Remind Me of You)" (Harry Link, Holt Marvell, Jack Strachey) – 3:28
4. "Just Squeeze Me (But Please Don't Tease Me)" (Duke Ellington, Lee Gaines) – 3:05
5. "Angel Eyes" (Earl Brent, Matt Dennis) – 3:37
6. "That Old Black Magic" (Harold Arlen, Johnny Mercer) – 3:38
7. "Just One of Those Things" (Cole Porter) – 3:39
8. "I Loves You, Porgy" (George Gershwin, Ira Gershwin, Dubose Heyward) – 4:56
9. "It's All Right With Me" (Porter) – 2:37
10. "I Can't Give You Anything But Love" (Dorothy Fields, Jimmy McHugh) – 3:26
11. Introduction in Italian by Norman Granz – 0:57
12. "When You're Smiling (The Whole World Smiles With You)" (Mark Fisher, Joe Goodwin, Larry Shay) – 1:40
13. "A Foggy Day" (G. Gershwin, I. Gershwin) – 3:09
14. "Midnight Sun" (Sonny Burke, Lionel Hampton, Mercer) – 3:40
15. "The Lady Is a Tramp" (Richard Rodgers, Lorenz Hart) – 2:46
16. "Sophisticated Lady" (Ellington, Irving Mills, Mitchell Parish) – 3:58
17. "Caravan" (Ellington, Mills, Juan Tizol) – 2:43
18. "Stompin' at the Savoy" (Benny Goodman, Andy Razaf, Edgar Sampson, Chick Webb) – 7:10

== Personnel ==
Recorded April 25, 1958, Rome, Italy

- Ella Fitzgerald - Vocals
- Lou Levy - Piano
- Max Bennett - Bass
- Gus Johnson - Drums

Except on Track 18:

- Oscar Peterson - Piano
- Ray Brown - Bass
- Herb Ellis - Guitar
- Gus Johnson - Drums
