= Lou Levy (pianist) =

American jazz pianist (1928–2001)

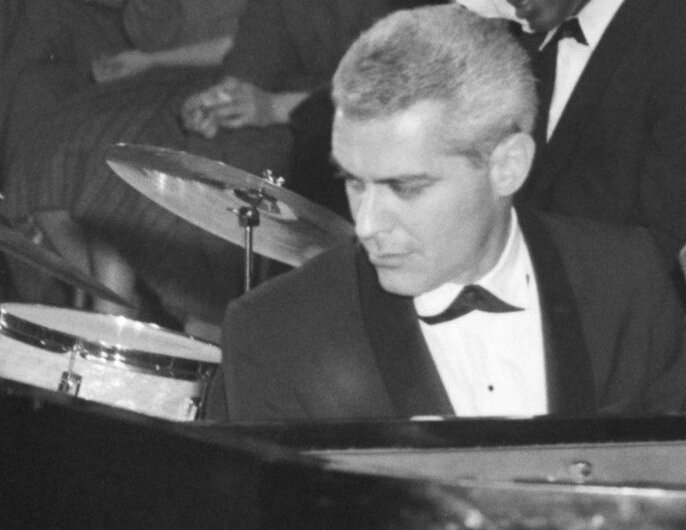
- Lou Levy in Amsterdam, 1959

Background information
- Born: March 5, 1928; Chicago, Illinois, U.S.
- Died: January 23, 2001 (aged 72) Dana Point, California, U.S.
- Genre: Jazz
- Occupation: Musician
- Instrument: Piano
- Years active: 1947–2000
- Labels: Nocturne, Warner Bros., RCA, Atlantic, Verve
- Formerly of: Supersax

Louis A. Levy (March 5, 1928 – January 23, 2001) was an American jazz pianist.

== Biography ==
Levy was born to Jewish parents in Chicago, Illinois, United States, and started to play the piano aged twelve. His chief influences were Art Tatum and Bud Powell.

A professional at age nineteen, Levy played with Georgie Auld (1947 and later), Sarah Vaughan, Chubby Jackson (1947–1948), Boyd Raeburn, Woody Herman's Second Herd (1948–1950), Tommy Dorsey (1950) and Flip Phillips. Levy left music for a few years in the early 1950s and then returned to gain a strong reputation as an accompanist to singers, working with Peggy Lee (1955–1973), Ella Fitzgerald (1957–1962), June Christy, Anita O'Day, Pinky Winters, and Thelma Gracen. Levy also played with Dizzy Gillespie, Shorty Rogers, Stan Getz, Terry Gibbs, Benny Goodman, Supersax and most of the major West Coast players. Levy recorded as a leader for Nocturne (1954), RCA, Jubilee, Philips, Interplay (1977), and Verve.

Levy died of a heart attack in Dana Point, California at the age of 72.

== Selected discography ==
=== As leader ===
Year recorded	Title	Label	Notes
1954?	The Lou Levy Trio	Nocturne	reissued on Fresh Sound, 1988
1955	West Coast Wailers	Atlantic	Quintet, with Conte Candoli (trumpet), Bill Holman (tenor sax), Leroy Vinnegar (bass), Lawrence Marable (drums)
1956	Solo Scene	RCA	Solo piano
1956	Jazz in Four Colors	RCA	Quartet, with Larry Bunker (vibraphone), Leroy Vinnegar (bass), Stan Levey (drums)
1956–57	A Most Musical Fella	BMG/RCA/Cloud 9	Trio, with Max Bennett (bass), Stan Levey (drums)
1958	Lou Levy Plays Baby Grand Jazz	Jubilee	Trio, with Max Bennett (bass), Gus Johnson (drums)
1962	The Hymn		Trio, with Max Bennett (bass), Stan Levey (drums)
1977	Tempus Fugue-It	Interplay	Trio, with Fred Atwood (bass), John Dentz (drums)
1978	Touch of Class	Dobre	Trio, with Fred Atwood (bass), John Dentz (drums)
1982	The Kid's Got Ears	Jazziz	Three tracks solo piano; three tracks duo, with John Heard (bass); four tracks trio, with Shelly Manne (drums) added
1993?	Lunarcy	Verve	Quartet, with Pete Christlieb (tenor sax), Eric Von Essen (bass), Ralph Penland (drums)
1993	Ya Know	Verve/Polygram	Most tracks quartet, with Eric Von Essen (cello, bass), Pierre Michelot (bass), Alvin Queen (drums)
1995?	By Myself	Verve	Solo piano

=== As sideman ===
Date	Artist	Album title	Label	Notes
1957	Manny Albam	The Jazz Greats of Our Time – Vol. 2	Coral	
1957	Manny Albam	West Coast Delivery – Jazz Lab Vol. 12	Coral	
1963	Georgie Auld Quintet	The Georgie Auld Quintet Plays the Winners	Philips	
1963	Georgie Auld Sextet	Here's to the Losers	Philips	
1962	Louis Bellson	Big Band Jazz from the Summit	Roulette	
1966	Tony Bennett	The Movie Song Album	Columbia	Levy on three tracks
1956	Elmer Bernstein	The Man with the Golden Arm	Decca	
1997	Dee Dee Bridgewater	Dear Ella	Verve	
1978	Ruth Brown	You Don't Know Me	Dobre Records	
1955	Conte Candoli	Conte Candoli	Bethlehem	
1976	Pete Christlieb / Warne Marsh	Apogee	Warner	
1976	Pete Christlieb	Self Portrait	Bosco	With Warne Marsh
1977	June Christy	Impromptu	Interplay	Supervised by Bob Cooper
1981	Al Cohn	Nonpareil	Concord Jazz	Released in 1992
1958	Bob Cooper	Coop! The Music of Bob Cooper	Contemporary	
1991	Bob Cooper Quartet	For All We Know	Fresh Sound	
1959	Herb Ellis w/ Jimmy Giuffre	Herb Ellis Meets Jimmy Giuffre	Verve	
1963	Herb Ellis w/ Stuff Smith	Together	Epic	
1989	Art Farmer	Central Avenue Reunion	Contemporary	
1958	Ella Fitzgerald	Ella in Rome: The Birthday Concert	Verve	Released in 1988
1958	Ella Fitzgerald	Ella Swings Lightly	Verve	
1959	Ella Fitzgerald	Ella Fitzgerald Sings the George and Ira Gershwin Songbook	Verve	
1959	Ella Fitzgerald	Get Happy!	Verve	
1961	Ella Fitzgerald	Ella in Hollywood	Verve	
1961	Ella Fitzgerald	Ella Returns to Berlin	Verve	
1961	Ella Fitzgerald	Clap Hands, Here Comes Charlie!	Verve	
1957	Herb Geller	Fire in the West	Jubilee	
1955	Stan Getz, Shelly Manne, Leroy Vinnegar, Conte Candoli	West Coast Jazz	Norgran/Verve	
1957	Stan Getz	The Steamer	Verve	
1957	Stan Getz	Stan Getz and the Cool Sounds	Verve	Levy on four tracks
1958	Stan Getz	The Great English Concert 1958	Jazz Groove	Six (of eleven) tracks with Getz (others feat. Coleman Hawkins and Roy Eldridge with nearly the same rhythm section)
1957	Stan Getz	Award Winner		
1957	Stan Getz	Getz Meets Mulligan		
1959	Stan Getz	Stan Getz and Gerry Mulligan / Stan Getz and the Oscar Peterson Trio	Verve	Levy on the two tracks with Getz and Mulligan (see also Gerry Mulligan
1981	Stan Getz	The Dolphin	Concord Jazz	
1981	Stan Getz Quartet	Spring Is Here	Concord Jazz	Released in 1992
1957	Terry Gibbs and Bill Harris	Woodchoppers' Ball	Premier Albums	
1957	Terry Gibbs	A Jazz Band Ball (Second Set)	Mode	
1959	Terry Gibbs Dream Band	The Sundown Sessions, Vol. 2	Contemporary	Live recording, released in 1987
1959	Terry Gibbs Dream Band	Flying Home, Vol. 3	Contemporary	Live recordings, released in 1988. Levy on four tracks
1959	Terry Gibbs Dream Band	One More Time, Vol. 6	Contemporary	Live recordings, released in 2002. Levy on four tracks
1982	Terry Gibbs & His West Coast Friends	My Buddy	Atlas	
1955	Lionel Hampton and Stan Getz	Hamp and Getz	Norgran	
1958	Coleman Hawkins and Roy Eldridge	The Great English Concert 1958	Jazz Groove	Five (of eleven) tracks (others feat. Stan Getz with nearly the same rhythm section)
1958	Coleman Hawkins Septet	Lover Man et al.	(various labels)	Live recordings; two tracks with Levy from the Jazz Festival in Antibes, France: "Undecided" and "Indian Summer"; first released maybe in 1987 or earlier
1960	Coleman Hawkins & Friends	Bean Stalkin'	Pablo	Live recording from Paris, France, released in 1988; four (of six) tracks with a sextet feat. Levy and Benny Carter
1948f	Woody Herman and His Orchestra	Woody Herman Second Herd	Capitol	
1957	Quincy Jones	Go West, Man!	ABC-Paramount	Levy on three tracks
1956	Peggy Lee	Black Coffee (reissue)	Decca	The four additional tracks for 12" LP release with Levy
1963	Peggy Lee	Mink Jazz	Capitol	
1965	Peggy Lee	Pass Me By	Capitol	
1955	Stan Levey	This Time the Drums on Me	Bethlehem	
1957	Stan Levey	Stan Levey Quintet	Mode	
1976	Warne Marsh	All Music	Nessa	
1984	Warne Marsh Quartet	A Ballad Album	Criss Cross Jazz	
1978	Charles McPherson	Free Bop!	Xanadu	
1977	Sam Most	Flute Flight	Xanadu	
1957	Gerry Mulligan w/ Stan Getz	Gerry Mulligan Meets Stan Getz	Verve	see also Stan Getz
1954 & 1956	Lennie Niehaus	Zounds! (Vol. 2 & 3: The Octet)	Contemporary	1958 LP release of both octet sessions prev. issued on 7" and 10"
1957	Lennie Niehaus	I Swing for You	EmArcy	
1960	Anita O'Day	Incomparable!	Verve	
1979	Anita O'Day	Mello'day	GNP Crescendo	Levy also arranger
1955	Shorty Rogers & His Giants	Martians Stay Home	Atlantic	Released 1980
1955	Shorty Rogers	Martians Come Back!	Atlantic	
1955	Shorty Rogers	Way Up There	Atlantic	
1956	Shorty Rogers	The Big Shorty Rogers Express	RCA Victor	
1957	Shorty Rogers	Wherever the Five Winds Blow	RCA Victor	
1958	Shorty Rogers	Portrait of Shorty	RCA Victor	
1960	Shorty Rogers	The Swingin' Nutcracker	RCA Victor	
1959	Sonny Stitt	Sonny Stitt Blows the Blues|Verve		
1959	Sonny Stitt	Saxophone Supremacy	Verve	
1959	Sonny Stitt	Sonny Stitt Swings the Most	Verve	
1960	Sonny Stitt	Previously Unreleased Recordings	Verve	Released in 1973
1980	Sonny Stitt & His West Coast Friends	Groovin' High	Atlas	With Art Pepper
1975	Supersax	Live in '75 – The Japanese Tour Vol. 2	Hindsight	Released in 1999
1977	Supersax	Chasin' the Bird	MPS/Pausa	
1979	Supersax	MPS/Pausa		
1983	Supersax & L.A. Voices	L.A.	Columbia	
1983	Supersax	Stone Bird	Columbia	
1993	Bennie Wallace	The Old Songs	AudioQuest	Levy on two tracks
1985	Pinky Winters	Let's Be Buddies	Jacqueline	With Monty Budwig
