= Wilfred Middlebrooks =

American jazz musician

Wilfred Roland Middlebrooks (July 17, 1933, Chattanooga, Tennessee - March 13, 2008, Pasadena, California) was an American jazz double-bassist.

Middlebrooks performed in a traveling show as a teenager and then worked with Tab Smith (1950-1953) before serving in the US Armed Forces.

He moved to southern California and played in Los Angeles with Buddy Collette, Eric Dolphy, Frank Rosolino, Mel Lewis, Bill Holman, Billy Higgins, and Art Pepper in the 1950s.

In 1958 he began accompanying Ella Fitzgerald and worked with her through 1963, including on a television performance alongside Dizzy Gillespie in 1959.

Following this he worked with Paul Smith and Bobby Troup in California.

When jazz work dwindled, he became a postal worker in 1978 and worked for the USPS until 1995, though he continued to play jazz on the side, and was active as a performer in local clubs into the 2000s.
