= Ella in Hollywood =

Live album by Ella Fitzgerald
- Released: 1961
- Recorded: May 11–21, 1961
- Genre: Jazz
- Length: 47:48
- Label: Verve
- Producer: Norman Granz

Ella Fitzgerald chronology
Ella Fitzgerald Sings the Harold Arlen Songbook (1960)	Ella in Hollywood (1961)	Clap Hands, Here Comes Charlie! (1961)

Professional ratings
Review scores
Source	Rating
Allmusic	4/5 stars
The Rolling Stone Jazz Record Guide	3/5 stars

Ella in Hollywood is a live 1961 (see 1961 in music) album by Ella Fitzgerald, with a jazz quartet led by Lou Levy, recorded in Hollywood, Los Angeles.

This album features Ella at the height of her vocal powers, one month before the recording one of her more critically acclaimed studio albums, Clap Hands, Here Comes Charlie!.

Ella in Hollywood features several songs that serve as starting points for Ella's seemingly effortless scat solos, and a selection of beautiful ballads balance out the album.

== Track listing ==
For the 1961 Verve LP release; Re-issued in 2009 on CD, Verve

Side One:

1. "This Could Be the Start of Something Big" (Steve Allen) – 2:33
2. "I've Got the World on a String" (Harold Arlen, Ted Koehler) – 3:44
3. "You're Driving Me Crazy" (Walter Donaldson) – 3:23
4. "Just in Time" (Betty Comden, Adolph Green, Jule Styne) – 1:56
5. "It Might as Well Be Spring" (Oscar Hammerstein II, Richard Rodgers) – 3:07
6. "Take the "A" Train" (Billy Strayhorn) – 9:04

Side Two:

1. "Stairway to the Stars" (Matty Malneck, Mitchell Parish, Frank Signorelli) – 3:56
2. "(If You Can't Sing It) You'll Have to Swing It (Mr. Paganini)" (Sam Coslow) – 4:05
3. "Satin Doll" (Duke Ellington, Johnny Mercer, Strayhorn) – 2:53
4. "Blue Moon" (Richard Rodgers, Lorenz Hart) – 3:17
5. "Baby, Won't You Please Come Home?" (Charles Warfield, Clarence Williams) – 3:41
6. "Air Mail Special" (Charlie Christian, Benny Goodman, Jimmy Mundy) – 5:26

== Personnel ==
Recorded live, May 11- May 21, 1961, Hollywood, Los Angeles:

- Ella Fitzgerald - Vocals
- Wilfred Middlebrooks - Bass
- Lou Levy - Piano
- Gus Johnson - Drums
- Herb Ellis - Guitar

Note: The vinyl LP issued on verve, V-4052 indicates, incorrectly that the guitarist was Jim Hall.
