= Clap Hands! Here Comes Charley! =

Song performed by Billy Murray

"Clap Hands! Here Comes Charley!" is a popular song that was written by Billy Rose, Ballard MacDonald and Joseph Meyer and was first published in 1925. The song was recorded by several popular singers of the era, including a version by Billy Murray in 1925, but the most popular version at that time was by Johnny Marvin. In the 1930s, the song became the theme tune of British dance band pianist Charlie Kunz. In the 1960s, the song was used to promote Hormel chili, as in, "Clap hands, here comes chili...".

Filmed in Funny Lady.

== See also ==
- 1925 in music
