= Music of Tennessee =

The story of Tennessee's contribution to American music is essentially the story of three cities: Nashville, Memphis, and Bristol. While Nashville is most famous for its status as the long-time capital of country music, Bristol is recognized as the "Birthplace of Country Music". Memphis musicians have had an enormous influence on blues, early rock and roll, R&B, and soul music, as well as an increasing presence in rap.

== Bristol: "Birthplace of Country Music" ==
Bristol is best known for being the site of the first commercial recordings of country music, showcasing Jimmie Rodgers and the Carter Family, and later a favorite venue of mountain musician Uncle Charlie Osborne. Bristol is also the birthplace of Tennessee Ernie Ford.

In 1927, Ralph Peer of Victor Records began recording local musicians in Bristol to capture the local sound of traditional “folk” music of the region. One of these local sounds was created by the Carter Family. The Carter Family got their start on July 31, 1927, when A.P. Carter and his family journeyed from Maces Spring, Virginia, to Bristol, Tennessee, to audition for record producer Ralph Peer who was seeking new talent for the relatively embryonic recording industry. They received $50 for each song they recorded.

The U.S. Congress recognized Bristol as the “Birthplace of Country Music” in 1998 for its contributions to early country music recordings and ongoing influence.

== Nashville: "Music City, U.S.A." ==
Nashville, the most populous city and metropolitan area in the state, is home to the Grand Ole Opry (est. 1925) and the Country Music Hall of Fame (est. 1967), and bears the nickname "Music City, U.S.A.".

In a tour of Great Britain and Europe in 1873, the Fisk Jubilee Singers, the first former slaves to tour Europe after the Civil War, performed the spirituals "Steal Away to Jesus" and "Go Down, Moses" for Queen Victoria in April. According to local oral tradition, Queen Victoria was so impressed by the Singers that she commented that with such beautiful voices, they had to be from the Music City of the United States. Hence, the moniker for Nashville, Tennessee – Music City USA – was born. They returned to Europe the following year, touring from May 1875 to July 1878. This tour raised an estimated $150,000 for the university, funds used to construct Fisk's first permanent building. Named Jubilee Hall, the building was designated a National Historic Landmark in 1975 and still stands.

Ryman Auditorium, opened in 1892, is a world-famous music venue in downtown Nashville, known for hosting the Grand Ole Opry from 1943 to 1974 and The Johnny Cash Show from 1969 to 1971.

WSM (AM) signed on in 1925, the same year launching WSM Barndance soon known as Grand Ole Opry. The weekly stage show and broadcast would play an important role in the popularization of country music and is today the longest running radio program in the world.

By the late 1950s, the city's record labels dominated the country music genre with slick pop-country (Nashville sound), overtaking honky-tonk in the charts. Performers reacting against the Nashville sound formed their own scenes in Lubbock, Texas and Bakersfield, California, the latter of which (Bakersfield sound) became the most popular type of country by the late 1960s, led by Merle Haggard. Progressive country and outlaw country emerged to challenge the prevailing Nashville sound. Nashville's predominance in country music was regained by the early 1980s, when Dwight Yoakam and other neo-traditionalists entered the charts.

Even as country music became central to Nashville's identity and music commerce, a string of clubs on Jefferson Street played host to electrifying rhythm and blues. It's where Jimi Hendrix cut his teeth and where Etta James 'Rocked The House' on her 1964 live recording from the New Era Club. Meanwhile, white and black met in Printer's Alley, where Music Row studio musicians gathered at day's end to play jazz and rock and roll. Nashville's WLAC radio was a vital source for R&B from the mid-1940s through the 1960s. The 2004 compilation album Night Train to Nashville, spawned by an exhibit at the Country Music Hall of Fame, showcased and celebrated this history.

In 1966, Bob Dylan released his landmark Blonde on Blonde album, primarily recorded in Nashville, assisted by local session musicians the Nashville Cats by suggestion of producer Bob Johnston. The album's success helped transform Nashville's conservative music reputation and artists including Simon and Garfunkel and Leonard Cohen soon followed to record there with Johnston. Dylan continued his relationship with the city on 1967's John Wesley Harding and 1969's Nashville Skyline.

Exit/In is a long-time Nashville club, opened in 1971, having played host to many rock legends and locals including Jason & the Scorchers and featured in Robert Altman's Nashville.

Lucy's Record Shop was an independent, locally owned record store and all-ages music venue in Nashville in the 1990s. During its five and a half years of operation, Lucy's supported a growing punk and indie music scene in Nashville, and even received national notoriety as a prominent underground music venue. Lambchop played some of their first shows at Lucy's.

Outsider music greats from Nashville include R. Stevie Moore and Dave Cloud.

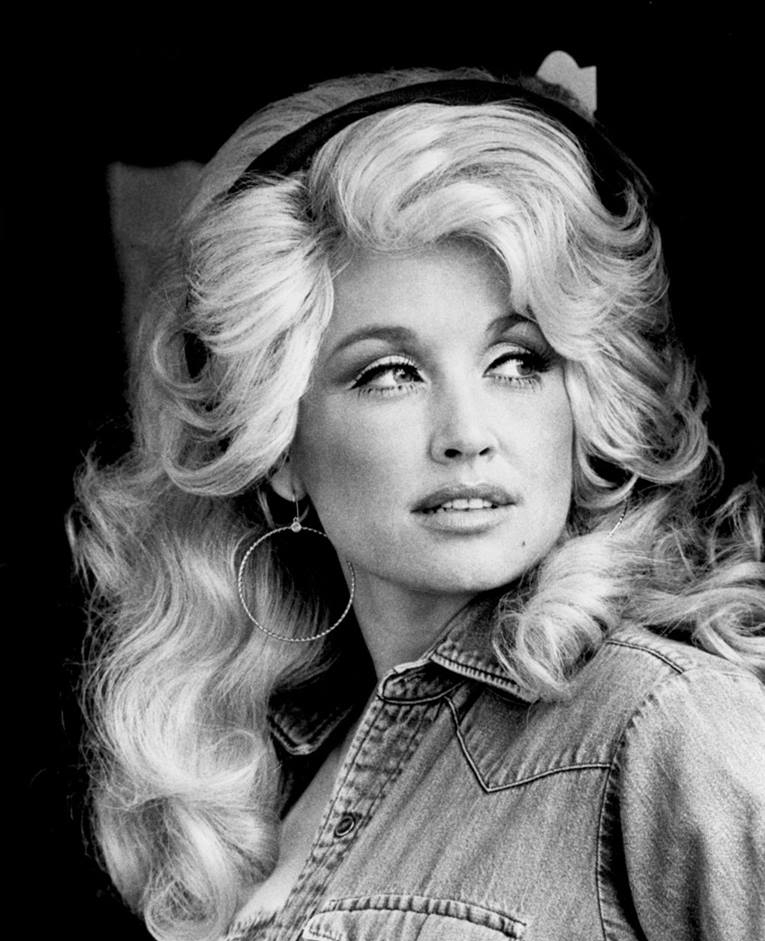
Dolly Parton in 1977

Today, there is still a thriving country music scene in Nashville, however there are other scenes and genres gaining in outside attention, such as indie, rock, and metalcore. Infinity Cat Recordings, home of JEFF the Brotherhood and Be Your Own Pet, and Jack White's Third Man Records are prime examples. Dolly Parton, "the Queen of Country" and owner of Dollywood, had 2 #1 Hot 100 hits, including "9 to 5" in 1981. In pop music, Kesha from Nashville has had 3 #1 Hot 100 hits on the Billboard charts, including "Tik Tok" in 2009. Miley Cyrus from Franklin has had 2 #1 Hot 100 hits like "Wrecking Ball" in 2013 and "Flowers" in 2023. The pop punk band Paramore, also from Franklin and fronted by Hayley Williams, had a #1 album on the Billboard 200 with Paramore in 2013. Country superstar Kenny Chesney from Knoxville has had 8 #1 albums on the Billboard 200 from 2002 to 2020 like When the Sun Goes Down in 2004. Chesney graduated from East Tennessee State University in 1990. Lady Antebellum from Nashville had 3 #1 albums on the Billboard 200 including Need You Now in 2010. Hillary Scott attended Middle Tennessee State University. The Civil Wars, an Americana and folk duo, also had a #1 album on the Billboard 200 in 2013. Country and R&B singer Kane Brown from Chattanooga had a #1 album in 2018. Morgan Wallen from the Knoxville area has had 2 #1 albums like Dangerous: The Double Album in 2021, and he had the long running #1 Hot 100 "Last Night" in 2023. Judah & the Lion and Moon Taxi are popular bands from Nashville, and members from both bands attended Belmont University.

== Murfreesboro ==
Murfreesboro hosts several music-oriented events annually, such as the Main Street Jazzfest presented by MTSU's School of Music and the Main Street Association each May. For over 30 years, Uncle Dave Macon Days has celebrated the musical tradition of Uncle Dave Macon. This annual July event includes national competitions for old-time music and dancing.

Because of Middle Tennessee State University's large recording industry program, the city has fostered a number of bands and songwriters, including: A Plea for Purging, Self, Fluid Ounces, The Katies, The Features, Count Bass D, The Tony Danza Tapdance Extravaganza, Destroy Destroy Destroy, De Novo Dahl, The Protomen, and Those Darlins. Several notable musicians have attended or graduated from MTSU, including Julien Baker, Sharon Van Etten, George S. Clinton, Hardy, Tay Keith, Lecrae, Amy Lee, and Hillary Scott.

Spongebath Records was a key force in the Murfreesboro indie music scene in the late 1990s.

== Old-time music ==
The state of Tennessee once had a strong Old-time music tradition. In its earliest days the Grand Ole Opry featured banjo players, fiddle players, and string bands from Middle Tennessee such as Uncle Jimmy Thompson, Uncle Dave Macon, Fiddlin' Arthur Smith, Sid Harkreader, the McGee Brothers, Humphrey Bate and his Possum Hunters, Binkley Brothers' Dixie Clodhoppers, the Gully Jumpers, the Fruit Jar Drinkers, and The Crook Brothers String Band. East Tennessee old-time artists include Clarence Ashley, Charlie Bowman, Uncle Am Stuart, Theron Hale, Curly Fox, and G. B. Grayson.

Tennessee also has a strong history of Appalachian ballad singers. Collectors like Cecil Sharp, Artus Moser, C P Cambiaire, Edwin Kirkland, Lillian Crabtree, and George Boswell all included TN ballads in their collections. Notable TN ballad singers include Dee and Delta Hicks, Carmen McCord Hicks, May Ray, Tillman Cadle, Sam Harmon, J B Cantrell, Marianna Schaupp, Linnie Johnson and Jesse Robinson, and Jeff Stockton.

== Blues ==
=== Memphis blues ===
Memphis' most significant musical claims to fame are as "Home of the Blues" and "Birthplace of Rock and Roll". The African-American composer, W.C. Handy, is said to have written the first commercially successful blues song, "St. Louis Blues", in a bar on Beale Street in 1912. Handy resided in Memphis from 1909 through 1917. He also wrote "The Memphis Blues". Memphis blues is a regional style created by area musicians such as Frank Stokes, Sleepy John Estes, Furry Lewis, Memphis Minnie, and Memphis Jug Band in the 1910s-1930s, with stylistic origins in Country blues and Delta blues.

Memphis was a center of blues music for much of the 20th century. Pianist and singer Booker T. Laury was born in Memphis in 1914 and Blues Hall of Famers Johnny Shines and Memphis Slim were born there in 1915. During the 1940s and 1950s, Memphis was the home of B. B. King, Bobby Bland, Rosco Gordon, Junior Parker, Johnny Ace, Willie Nix, and Joe Hill Louis. Duke Records was started in Memphis in 1952. Also in 1952, Sam Phillips started Sun Records, an early rock and roll and electric blues label. Among the artists who made some of their recordings on Sun were Elvis Presley, Johnny Cash, Roy Orbison, Jerry Lee Lewis, Muddy Waters, Howlin' Wolf, Ike Turner, Carl Perkins, and Charlie Rich.

=== Country blues ===
Country blues is one of the earliest types of blues. Country blues artists from Tennessee include Memphis Jug Band, The Two Poor Boys, Howard Armstrong, Yank Rachell, Sleepy John Estes, Hammie Nixon, Son Bonds, Noah Lewis, DeFord Bailey, John Henry Barbee, Memphis Willie B., Hattie Hart, Mississippi Fred McDowell, Brownie McGhee, Blind James Campbell, Hambone Willie Newbern, Sonny Boy Williamson I, and Terry Garland.

== Jazz ==
Memphis-born jazz artists include clarinetist Buster Bailey, singers Alberta Hunter, Eden Atwood, Dee Dee Bridgewater, violinist Erskine Tate, bassists Moses Allen, Jamil Nasser, trumpeters Johnny Dunn, Tiny Davis, Booker Little, Louis Smith, Marvin Stamm, pianists Lil Hardin Armstrong, Harold Mabern, Phineas Newborn, Jr., Rozelle Claxton, Jimmy Jones, James Williams, alto saxophonists Frank Strozier, Sonny Criss, saxophonists George Coleman, Hank Crawford, Charles Lloyd, Ben Branch, Ben Smith, Garnett Brown, Frank Lowe, Kirk Whalum, drummers Jimmy Crawford and Tony Reedus, and guitarist Abu Talib. In addition, legendary band leader Jimmy Lunceford is closely associated with Memphis due to the influential jazz orchestra he formed in the late 1920s in that city.

Legendary blues singer Bessie Smith was born in Chattanooga, and busked its streets with her brother as a young girl. Double bassist Jimmy Blanton, member of Duke Ellington's band, pianist Lovie Austin, trumpeter and singer Valaida Snow, multi-instrumentalist and composer Yusef Lateef, and saxophonist Bennie Wallace were also born in Chattanooga. The city is immortalized in the 1941 big band swing song "Chattanooga Choo Choo".

Trumpeter Doc Cheatham was born in Nashville. Singer Joyce Cobb was born in Oklahoma, but raised in Nashville. Bandleader and vocalist Anna Mae Winburn was born in Port Royal. Pianist Phineas Newborn, Jr. and his brother guitarist Calvin Newborn were from Whiteville. Saxophonist Sam Taylor was born in Lexington. Alto saxophonist Charles Williams was born in Halls. Trombonist Dicky Wells was born in Centerville. Trombonist Jimmy Cleveland was born in Wartrace. Pianist Johnny Maddox was born in Gallatin. Vocalist King Pleasure was born in Oakdale.

Current large jazz orchestras from Tennessee that have notable recordings are the Jazz Orchestra of the Delta (Memphis), the Memphis Jazz Orchestra, the Knoxville Jazz Orchestra, the Nashville Jazz Orchestra, the Duffy Jackson Big Band (Nashville), Tyler Mire Big Band (Nashville), and the Music City Big Band (Nashville).

== R&B, soul, and funk ==
R&B singers Big Maybelle and Luther Ingram were born in Jackson. Tina Turner was born in Nutbush. Clifford Curry was born in Knoxville. Willie Mabon was born in Memphis. Koko Taylor was born in Shelby County. Roscoe Shelton was born in Lynchburg. Saxophonist and bandleader Paul Williams was born in Lewisburg. Drummer Clyde Stubblefield was born in Chattanooga. Arthur Gunter, Bobby Hebb, and Jackie Shane were born in Nashville. Excello Records was based in Nashville.

=== Memphis soul ===
In the 1960s and 1970s, the city was home to Hi and Stax Records, soul music record labels. Stax put out funky, distinctly Southern records by artists such as Otis Redding, Sam & Dave, Wilson Pickett, Booker T. & the M.G.'s, Rufus Thomas, Carla Thomas, William Bell, Wendy Rene, The Temprees, and The Bar-Kays; that stood in sharp contrast to the smoother, more pop records coming out of Detroit's Motown. Isaac Hayes born in Covington, was an in-house producer and songwriter at Stax. His "Theme from Shaft" was a #1 Hot 100 hit in 1971. David Porter was a staff songwriter.

Hi Records' peak was in the early 1970s, due to the highly creative work of Al Green, whose hits on the label included "Tired of Being Alone", "Let's Stay Together", "I'm Still in Love with You", and "Call Me". Other artists on the label, including O. V. Wright, Don Bryant, Otis Clay, and Ann Peebles released soul singles or albums. Goldwax Records introduced James Carr, Spencer Wiggins, and the Ovations.

Funk Band, Ebonee Webb, released "Something About You" which peaked at #16 on the Billboard Hot R&B/ hip-Hop charts on December 5, 1981.

Justin Timberlake "the Prince of Pop" from Memphis has had 4 #1 Billboard Hot 100 hits in the R&B genre, including "SexyBack" in 2006 and "Can't Stop the Feeling" in 2016.

== Hip-hop ==
See also: Southern hip hop § Tennessee, and Memphis rap

Despite not always being on the forefront of the national Hip-Hop scene, the hip-hop scene in Tennessee has been very active across the state but most prominently in the Memphis area. Some notable acts include Academy Award-winning rap group Three 6 Mafia (with Juicy J) was formed in Memphis. They had a #3 album on the Billboard 200 with Most Known Unknown in 2005. Other notable Memphis rappers include Project Pat, Gangsta Pat, Gangsta Boo, Playa Fly, Moneybagg Yo (had a #1 album in 2021), Blocboy JB, Young Dolph, Blac Youngsta Al Kapone, the duo Eightball & MJG, Yo Gotti, and GloRilla. Mr. Mack is based out of Knoxville. Isaiah Rashad is from Chattanooga. Young Buck, JellyRoll, Starlito, Tha City Paper, Negro Justice, and All Star Cashville Prince are from Nashville. Young Buck started the label Ca$hville Records. Christian hip-hop group GRITS are also from Nashville.

== Southern rock ==
Both Duane Allman and Gregg Allman, founders of the Allman Brothers Band, were born in Nashville in 1946 and 1947, respectively.

The Charlie Daniels Band is closely associated with Tennessee's contributions to the southern rock genre, and with the Volunteer Jam, an annual rock festival first held in Nashville in 1974.

Other notable musicians include Knoxville's Jerry Riggs, Nashville's Barefoot Jerry, and the Nashville band Area Code 615. Kings of Leon were formed in Tennessee in 1999. Their early music was closely associated with this genre. The Kings had a #1 hit on the Billboard Mainstream Top 40 with "Use Somebody". This song was also #1 on the Alternative chart and Adult Top 40 Chart in 2009. Kings of Leon had a #1 Billboard 200 album with Walls in 2016.

The Dirty Guv'nahs is an American Southern rock band from Knoxville, Tennessee. Known for enthusiastic live shows, the band was continually named the Best Band in Knoxville by readers of the alternative newspaper, Metro Pulse.

== Punk rock and hardcore ==
Punk rock has had active scenes in Tennessee, such as the scenes in Nashville, Knoxville, and Memphis's River City Hardcore scene in the 1980s and 1990s. A few hardcore punk bands gained a following, including His Hero Is Gone (Memphis), Nashville's Love Is Red, From Ashes Rise, and Committee for Public Safety, and Knoxville's Johnny Five, The Malignmen, The Splinters and STD.

Knoxville's punk scene began in the late 1970s with Terry Hill's Balboa, and took off in the early 1980s with bands such as the Five Twins, The Real Hostages, Candy Creme and the Wet Dream, and the hardcore bands Koro and UXB. During that era the scene was based in a series of short-lived nightclubs such as The Place, Hobos, Uncle Sam's, and Bundulees. Later in the 1980s several Knoxville bands such as the Judybats and Smokin' Dave and the Premo Dopes emerged to wider acclaim not limited to the local Knoxville scene. The scene again reached a peak during the mid-1990s, at that time tied closely to The Mercury Theatre, a popular all-ages venue where many Knoxville bands, such as Superdrag, got their start. After the close of the Mercury, another venue, The Neptune, opened for a short time under the same management. In 2004, Paramore originated out of Franklin.

The early 1970s power pop band Big Star, cited as a primary influence by many grunge and alternative rock groups since, was from Memphis. Memphis-based Goner Records, founded in 1993, has released artists including Oblivians, Reigning Sound, and Jay Reatard. Indie rock singer Julien Baker was active in the Memphis hardcore scene as a teenager, and continues to collaborate with punk and hardcore bands.

== Heavy metal ==
Heavy metal music groups from Tennessee include A Different Breed of Killer, Brodequin, Place of Skulls, Straight Line Stitch, and Whitechapel from Knoxville; Clockhammer, Intruder, and Today Is the Day from Nashville; Hosoi Bros, Nights Like These, and Tora Tora from Memphis; Tragedy in Progress from Chattanooga; and Destroy Destroy Destroy from Murfreesboro.

== Gospel and Christian music ==
Tennessee's location in the Bible Belt has led to an active southern Gospel music scene with such groups as The LeFevres, as well as being the origin of some notable Christian rock bands such as Memphis's DeGarmo and Key. The country group the Oak Ridge Boys started in 1945 as the Oak Ridge Quartet, a Southern Gospel group based in Knoxville who performed for workers at the nearby Oak Ridge facilities during World War II.

An African American a cappella ensemble, the Fisk Jubilee Singers, consisting of students at Fisk University in Nashville have been performing since 1871. The Fairfield Four started in Nashville and have existed since 1921.

Nashboro Records was a gospel record label active in Nashville in the 1950s-60s. Christian rock band Skillet, from Memphis, had a #2 album on the Billboard 200 with Awake in 2009. Nashville Christian hard rock band Red had a #2 album on the Billboard 200 in 2011.

== Classical music ==
Tennessee cities are home to several symphony orchestras:

- Bryan Symphony Orchestra, Cookeville, Tennessee
- Chattanooga Symphony Orchestra
- Jackson Symphony Orchestra, Jackson, Tennessee
- Johnson City Symphony Orchestra, Johnson City, Tennessee
- Knoxville Symphony Orchestra
- Memphis Symphony Orchestra
- IRIS Orchestra
- Nashville Symphony Orchestra
- Oak Ridge Symphony Orchestra, Oak Ridge, Tennessee
- Symphony of the Mountains, Kingsport, Tennessee

Each summer, the University of the South campus in Sewanee hosts the Sewanee Summer Music Festival, including classes for some 200 advanced music students and a series of concerts by well-known guest artists. While classical music predominates, bluegrass and other musical styles also are featured.

Cellist Joan Jeanrenaud from Memphis played with the Kronos Quartet from 1978 to 1999 and has since pursued a solo career.

== Notable music festivals in Tennessee ==
- Bonnaroo Music Festival (lasts for 4 days) in Manchester, Tennessee each June since 2002. Nashville's Kings of Leon played there in 2010
- Big Ears Festival in Knoxville, Tennessee
- Memphis in May in Memphis, Tennessee
- CMA Music Festival in Nashville, Tennessee

== See also ==
- Country Music Hall of Fame and Museum in Nashville
- Grand Ole Opry in Nashville
- Music City Walk of Fame in Nashville, honors contributors to Nashville's musical heritage
- Memphis Rock N' Soul Museum on Beale Street
- Memphis Music Hall of Fame
- Blues Hall of Fame in Memphis
- Highlander Folk School
- List of songs about Nashville, Tennessee
- Music of East Tennessee
