= Voices (U of Memphis album) =

Studio album by University of Memphis Southern Comfort Jazz Orchestra
- Released: September 4, 2007
- Recorded: April 15, 2004; April 9/10 2005
- Genres: Jazz, big band
- Length: 65:00
- Labels: University of Memphis; Select-O-Hits
- Producer: Jack Cooper

University of Memphis Southern Comfort Jazz Orchestra chronology
The Memphis Jazz Box (compilation) (2004)	Voices (2007)	Out of the Bluffs (2009)
- cat # UMR 7281

Audio sample
- "In This Corner…": file; help

Voices is an initial 2007 compact disc by the University of Memphis Southern Comfort Jazz Orchestra recorded in the studio. This was their 1st full-length feature CD release since an LP recording under the direction of Gene Rush in 1987. Since the late 1960s this group has been consistently recognized as one of the top collegiate jazz ensembles in the country recently being invited to the 2011 Jazz Education Network Convention, the 2000 International Association for Jazz Education Convention, and touring Europe in 1998. Musicians from this CD went on to study with Bob Brookmeyer at the New England Conservatory of Music, Indiana University, work professionally, and teach at universities.

== Background ==
Voices was recorded to present a wide range of music to include tunes arranged of past University of Memphis alumni Mulgrew Miller and James Williams. Before this release the group was honored to be included on the 3 CD compilation Memphis Jazz Box in 2004 released by Ice House Records. U of M Jazz Orchestra alumni include James Williams, Mulgrew Miller, Tony Reedus, Donald Brown, Bill Easley, and Bill Mobley.

== Reception ==
Professional ratings
Review scores
Source	Rating
JazzTimes	very favorable
JazzTimes	very favorable (second review)
Jazzreview.com	2/4 stars

"...that the playing is so impressive and has the feeling of being effortless on what must have been rather difficult charts to master...it is the rich ensemble sound that makes this CD most memorable"

JazzTimes.com (review 2008)

"Throughout Voices, the writing is quite colorful, adventurous and challenging"

JazzTimes.com (review 2009)

== Track listing ==
Track Listing:

No.	Title	Length
1.	"In This Corner…(José Arellano)"	4:33
2.	"Similau (Arden Clar/Harry Coleman, arr. George Russell, trans./edit. Jack Cooper)"	3:17
3.	"Deliberation (Jeremy Shrader)"	5:25
4.	"Renaissance Lovers (James Williams, arr. David Shotsberger)"	6:33
5.	"Strauss’s Swing (Jeff Huddleston)"	5:14
6.	"Not Tennessee Waltz (Dave Lisik)"	7:52
7.	"Voices (Matt Tutor)"	6:57
8.	"Longing (Michael Waldrop)"	6:41
9.	"Samana (Manny Albam, arr. Bob Curnow)"	4:46
Total length:		65:00

== Recording sessions ==
- April 15, 2004 at the University of Memphis, Studios A/B Jon Frazer and Jeff Cline - engineers
- April 9/10, 2005 at Young Avenue Sound, Memphis Tennessee., Willie Pevear - engineer

== Musicians ==
- directed - Dr. Jack Cooper
- 1st alto saxophone - Isaac Daniel, Justin Johnson
- 2nd alto saxophone - Kreston Smith, Nadra Bingham
- 1st tenor saxophone/clarinet - Cedric Mayfield
- 2nd tenor saxophone - Cameron Ross, Damian Sanchez, Bryant Lockhart
- Baritone saxophone - Eric Hughes, Justin Johnson
- Lead trumpet/flugelhorn - Jamie West, Kyle Millsap
- 2nd (Lead) trumpet/flugelhorn - Brandon Potts, Marty Bishop
- 3rd trumpet/flugelhorn - Hunter McClure
- 4th trumpet/flugelhorn - Paul Morelli, Dave Lisik
- 5th trumpet/flugelhorn - Jamaal Wicks, Paul McKinney
- Lead trombone - Andrew Earle, Tony Garcia
- 2nd trombone - Stephen Kirby, Andrew Earle
- 3rd trombone - Chris Tucker
- Bass trombone - Cecil “Buster” Harris, Lauren Watson
- Guitar - Jason Barden
- Piano - Amy Rempel
- Bass - Roy Murdock
- Drums - James Sexton on YouTube
- Adjunct Faculty member Ed Murray performs all Latin and African percussion on tracks 2, 3, 5, 8 and 9

== Production ==
- Producer, editing: Jack Cooper
- Co-jazz instructor of rhythm sections and groups for CD: Tim Goodwin
- Co-producer, mixing, editing, and additional recording: Dave Lisik
- Recording engineers: Willie Pevear, Jeff Cline and Jon Frazer
- Mastering: Mark Yoshida at Audiographic Masterworks, Memphis, TN
- Photographs: Kay Yager and Kofi Martin
- Artwork: Carol Morse and Edwin Olivera
- Manufactured: John Phillips, Select-O-Hits
- Liner notes: Jack Cooper, Marvin Stamm, and Ken Kreitner

== Works from the compact disc ==
- Strauss’s Swing is published by Increase Music, Inc./BMI (increasemusic.com)
- Not Tennessee Waltz is published by UNC Jazz Press (UNC Jazz Press)
- Samana is published by Sierra Music Publishing (sierramusic.com)
