= It's All Right with Me =

Song by Peter Cookson
- Written: 1953
- Songwriter: Cole Porter

"It's All Right with Me" is a popular song written by Cole Porter, for his 1953 musical Can-Can, where it was introduced by Peter Cookson as the character Judge Aristide Forestier.

The song is also used in the 1997 musical High Society, which features Porter's songs. In the 1998 Broadway production it was performed by the character Tracy Samantha Lord, played by Melissa Errico.

== Other performances of the song ==
- Bing Crosby recorded the song in 1955 for use on his radio show and it was subsequently included in the box set The Bing Crosby CBS Radio Recordings (1954–56) issued by Mosaic Records (catalog MD7-245) in 2009.
- Chris Connor – This Is Chris (1955)
- Sonny Rollins – Work Time (1956)
- Erroll Garner (1956)
- Peggy Lee – Dream Street (1957)
- Ella Fitzgerald – Ella Fitzgerald Sings the Cole Porter Songbook (1956), Ella at the Opera House (1958), Ella in Rome: The Birthday Concert (1959)
- Rita Reys – The Cool Voice of Rita Reys (1956)
- Harry James – Harry James and His New Jazz Band, Vol. 1 (Mr. Music MMCD 7010, 1956 [2002])
- Ike Quebec Blue and Sentimental Blue notes original December 1961 recorded at the Rudy Van Gelder studio at Englewood Cliffs New Jersey and later included on the 1988 first CD edition. A 2007 CD issued as Blue note Records RVB edition 0946-3-93184-21 all transferred from analog to digital at 24 bit produced by Michael Cuscuna. EMI
- Jeri Southern – Jeri Southern Meets Cole Porter (1959)
- Curtis Fuller – The Curtis Fuller Jazztet (1960)
- Frank Sinatra – recorded for the film version of Can-Can at Capitol Records on August 27, 1959, conducted by Nelson Riddle and released on the Can-Can soundtrack LP. He recorded it again in 1984 for L.A. Is My Lady. In the film, Sinatra sings the song to dancer Juliet Prowse; on his December 13, 1959 television show An Afternoon with Frank Sinatra, he sings it to her again.
- Vic Damone – On the Swingin' Side (1961)
- Steve Lawrence – Lawrence Goes Latin (1961)
- Brenda Lee – All Alone Am I (1963)
- Crystal Gayle – We Must Believe in Magic (1977). Crystal Gayle's version was also adapted into a jingle for Eastern Airlines in the late 1970s ("Eastern's got the right time and the right place for you...")
- Zoot Sims – Zoot Sims in Copenhagen (1978, released 1995), with Kenny Drew, Niels-Henning Ørsted Pedersen and Ed Thigpen
- Ann Miller covered the song in an episode of The Love Boat (1982)
- Tom Waits – Red Hot + Blue (1990)
- Harry Connick Jr. – We Are in Love (1990)
- Mel Tormé – Sing Sing Sing (1992)
- George Michael – Songs from the Last Century (1999)
- Susannah McCorkle – Ballad Essentials (2002)
- Jazz Orchestra of the Delta – Big Band Reflections of Cole Porter (2003)
- Natalie Cole – Still Unforgettable (2008)
- Brad Mehldau – Art of the Trio Volume Two (1998); Live in Marciac (2011)
- Moloko covered the song for their 1995 tour, Róisín Murphy also covered it in 2004.
- Chelsea Krombach – Profile (2004)
- Seth MacFarlane – No One Ever Tells You (2015)
- Oleta Adams – Third Set (2017)
- Piero Cusato – solo piano, recording from SoundCloud.
- Gregory Golub – Israeli composer and jazz pianist – jazz piano ver.2 (2015), jazz piano ver.3 (2021)
- Susie Arioli – Canadian jazz vocalist (2023)
