= WUMR =

WUMR may refer to:

- WUMR (FM), a radio station (106.1 FM) licensed to serve Philadelphia, Pennsylvania, United States
- WYXR, a radio station (91.7 FM) licensed to serve Memphis, Tennessee, United States, which held the call sign WUMR from 1994 to 2020
