= Snail (disambiguation) =

Snail is usually one of almost all members of the molluscan class Gastropoda which have coiled shells.

Snail may also refer to

== Music ==
- Snails (DJ) (born 1988), Canadian DJ and producer
- Snail (band), American rock band
- "Snail", a song by The Smashing Pumpkins from the 1991 album Gish
- Snails (EP), a 2005 EP by The Format
- "Snail" (song), a 2020 song by Benee
- "Snail", a song by Ogbert the Nerd from their 2020 album I Don't Hate You
- The Snails, an American rock band

== Other uses ==
- Snails (video game), a 2002 shooting game by PDAMill for the Pocket PC
- Snail (company), a Chinese video game company
- Snail (advertisement), a 2004 television advertisement for Guinness Extra Cold
- SNAI1, or Snail, protein-coding gene
- The Snail, a 1953 collage by Henri Matisse
- A slang term for the power source of some rotary snowplows
- A slang term for a turbocharger or centrifugal supercharger.
- A spiral-shaped cam, used in striking clocks and other mechanisms
- SNAIL (Superconducting Nonlinear Asymmetric Inductive eLements), a device based on Josephson junctions used in quantum superconducting circuits
- Snail, a character in the animated series Adventure Time

== See also ==
- Brian the Snail, a snail in the English version of the French children's television programme The Magic Roundabout
- Finger Snail, a possible pharaoh of prehistoric Egypt whose existence is questioned
- Gary the Snail, a character in the Nickelodeon animated 1999 TV series SpongeBob SquarePants
- Les Escargots (The Snails), a 1965 animation by René Laloux
- Snail darter, a small fish native to east Tennessee
- Snail Maze, a 1986 video game by Sega, part of the Sega Master System
- Snail kite, Rostrhamus sociabilis, a bird of prey within the family Accipitridae
