= Davur Juul Magnussen =

Faroese-born Scottish trombonist

Davur Juul Magnussen (born 1986) is a Faroese trombonist from Tórshavn, who now lives in Scotland. He was appointed as the principal trombone chair of the Royal Scottish National Orchestra at the age of 22. He is the youngest member of the national orchestra and according to The Herald his appointment is to "one of the most prestigious positions" in the brass section. He is considered one of the most technically able and talented trombonists of his generation.

In May 2016, he was appointed vice-president of the British Trombone Society.

== Work ==
Davur had initially intended to study the saxophone but ended up having to play the trombone. Although the trombone was not Davur's instrument of choice he has flourished as a trombonist and is now considered to be one of the finest players of his generation. Davur is currently a student at the Royal Scottish Academy of Music and Drama. Davur is studying for a Bachelor of Music degree. His current teacher is former RSNO principal trombonist Lance Green. This makes the 22-year-old Davur the youngest RSNO member and is one of many young players in the orchestra.
