= From This Moment On (Cole Porter song) =

1950 popular song written by Cole Porter

"From This Moment On" is a 1950 popular song written by Cole Porter, which has since become a jazz standard. It was originally written for the 1950 musical Out of This World, but director George Abbott dropped it from the musical before its Broadway premiere, possibly due to lackluster singing by cast member William Eythe. It was then included in MGM's 1953 film Kiss Me Kate (an adaptation of Porter's stage musical Kiss Me, Kate) in which it was sung by Ann Miller, Tommy Rall, Bob Fosse and Bobby Van. In the 1999 revival of Kiss Me, Kate it was performed as a duet between Harrison Howell and Lilli Vanessi.

Many versions of the song have been recorded, including those by:

- Doris Day – a single (1950)
- Guy Lombardo – a single (December 1950)
- Les Brown – Live At The Hollywood Palladium (1953)
- Ella Fitzgerald – Ella Fitzgerald Sings the Cole Porter Song Book (1956)
- Frank Sinatra – A Swingin' Affair! (1957)
- Lena Horne – Stormy Weather (1957)
- The Carpenters – Live at the Palladium (1976)
- Jimmy Somerville – Red Hot + Blue (1990)
- Jazz Orchestra of the Delta with Sandra Dudley – Big Band Reflections of Cole Porter (2003)
- Diana Krall – From This Moment On (2006)
- Brad Mehldau – Live in Tokyo (2004)
