= Memphis Jazz Box =

Box set by various Memphis jazz artists
- Released: March 9, 2004; Re-released 2008
- Recorded: Various dates between 1995–2003
- Genre: Jazz
- Length: 2:33:46
- Label: Icehouse Records
- Producers: John Threadgill; Jack Cooper; John Phillips
- Compiler: Jack Cooper
- cat. # - Ice House Records IHR 5902

The Memphis Jazz Box is a 3-CD box set by Memphis jazz artists, first released by Ice House Records in March 2004 and then re-released to the public in 2008. Volume one and two have a combined 24 tracks from a wide variety of artists who were currently working in Memphis during the time the set was produced. The third CD is the Jazz Orchestra of the Delta Big Band Reflections of Cole Porter recorded in 2003 for Summit Records.

== Background ==
The Memphis tradition of jazz music dates back many years to the time of W.C.Handy, Jimmie Lunceford, and Phineas Newborn. Memphis is a city with a long musical heritage that is an integral part of the American sound consisting of work songs, spirituals, blues, jazz, gospel, and rock and roll. Through this tradition, Memphis is a music city that serves to foster musical talent that is unique. There is a wide range a music on the CD set that represents the current flavor of what Memphis music is; from the traditional sounds to Joyce Cobb and W.C. Handy to the contemporary sounds of fusion with the band Voodoo Village. This box set of three CD was produced commercially to promote the city and the jazz music generated from the Mid-south region. This was the second such boxed set produced by Ice House Records and the Chamber of Commerce. The first set, produced in 2001, featured "Best Of. . ." tracks from Sun, Stax, and Hi Records.

== Track listing ==
All tracks are written by noted.

Disc one - THE NEW MEMPHIS JAZZ COLLECTION (Volume one) from the Memphis Jazz Box
No.	Title	Writer(s)	Original Album	Length
1.	"Let's Get Lost" (Kelley Hurt)	McHugh/Loesser	Raindance	3:29
2.	"The Protagonist" (Jack Cooper Quartet)	Jack Cooper		5:51
3.	"Bags" (The U of Memphis Southern Comfort Jazz Orchestra)	Bill Holman		3:12
4.	"Garment District" (Voodoo Village)	Ernest Williamson	Funk Soup	4:10
5.	"Family Money" (Hope Clayburn)	Hope Clayburn	Report 4 Booty	6:49
6.	"Beale St. Blues" (Joyce Cobb & the Beale St. Jazz Band)	W.C. Handy	Jazzin on Beale	4:26
7.	"I've Got You Under My Skin" (T.J. Graham)	Cole Porter		4:51
8.	"Rhythm is Our Business" (The New Memphis Hepcats)	Jimmie Lunceford	Swingopoly	3:14
9.	"Andrea" (Herman Green & the Green Machine)	Herman Green	Hernando Street Strut	5:31
10.	"One Kind Word" (Charlie Wood)	Charlie Wood	Southbound	3:52
11.	"Corcovado" (Holly Shelton & the Backroom Boys)	Antonio Carlos Jobim	Back on Beale Street	3:46
12.	"Reed Between the Lines" (Carl Wolfe Quartet)	Carl Wolfe		4:43
13.	"Reekin' With Love" (Di Anne Price & Her Boyfriends)	Di Anne Price	Reekin' With Love	2:41

Disc two - THE NEW MEMPHIS JAZZ COLLECTION (Volume two) from the Memphis Jazz Box
No.	Title	Writer(s)	Original Album	Length
1.	"Gentle Rain" (Teresa Pate)	Luiz Bonfá		4:15
2.	"2nd & Beale" (Freeworld)	Freeworld	Diversity	4:50
3.	"Crazy She Calls Me" (Gary Johns)	Sigman/Russell	Made In Memphis	6:02
4.	"El Gato De La Noche" (Memphis Jazz Orchestra)	Carl Wolfe		6:51
5.	"I Got It Bad (and That Ain't Good)" (Gene Rush)	Duke Ellington		6:21
6.	"Waltz For Debbie" (U of Memphis Jazz Singers)	Bill Evans		3:25
7.	"School Girl Crush" (Candice Ivory)	Candice Ivory	Path: Undefined	6:25
8.	"Voodoo Village" (Voodoo Village)	Kurt Clayton/Pat Register/Ernest Williamson	Funk Soup	5:23
9.	"Out of This World" (Kelley Hurt)	Arlen/Mercer	Raindance	4:15
10.	"River of Jive" (Charlie Wood)	Charlie Wood	Southbound	4:18
11.	"Local Edition" (Jack Cooper Quartet)	Jack Cooper		5:38

Disc Three - Big Band Reflections of Cole Porter
No.	Title	Original Album	Length
1.	"Big Band Reflections of Cole Porter" (Jazz Orchestra of the Delta)	All tracks - Big Band Reflections of Cole Porter

== Recording sessions ==
- DISC ONE - The New Memphis Jazz Collection, volume one

Recorded completed in several studios in Memphis to include Ardent Studios, Young Avenue Sound, Sam Phillips Recording Services

- DISC TWO - The New Memphis Jazz Collection, volume two

Recorded completed in several studios in Memphis to include Ardent Studios, Young Avenue Sound, Sam Phillips Recording Services

- DISC THREE - Big Band Reflections of Cole Porter, Jazz Orchestra of the Delta

Please refer to the Recording sessions section on that Wikipedia/CD page.

== Personnel ==
=== Musicians ===
- DISC ONE - The New Memphis Jazz Collection, volume one
- 1. Lets Get Lost
  Kelley Hurt, vocals/arranger
  Doug Garrison, percussion/drums
  Chris Parker, piano/arranger
  Jonathan Wires, bass
- 2. The Protagonist
  Jack Cooper, alto saxophone/composer
  Alvie Givhan, piano
  Tim Goodwin, bass
  Don Patterson, drums
- 3. Garment District
  Pat Register, saxophone
  Kurt Clayton, keyboards
  Niko Lyras, keyboards
  Ernest Williams, keyboards
  Dave Smith, bass
  Edward Cleveland, drums
- 4. Bags
  The University of Memphis Southern Comfort Jazz Orchestra
  Dr. Jack Cooper - director
- 5. Family Money
  Hope Clayburn, flute/saxophone
  Hope Clayburn's 2nd Booty Battalion
- 6. Beale Street Blues
  Joyce Cobb, vocals
  Tom Link, clarinet
  Tim Goodwin, bass
- 7. I've Got You Under My Skin
  T.J. Graham, vocals
  Footprints, (band)
- 8. Rhythm Is Our Business
  The New Memphis Hepcats
- 9. Andrea
  Herman Green, saxophone
  The Green Machine
- 10. One Kind Word
  Charlie Wood, vocals/keyboard/organ
  Tom Clary, trumpet and horn arrangements
  Scott Thompson, trumpet and flugelhorn
  Fred Ford, alto sax
  Tom Clary, trumpet and horn arrangements
  Jim Spake, tenor sax
  Joey Moore, bass
  David Forrester, drums
  Steve Wenger, guitar
- 11. Corcovado
  Holly Shelton, vocals
  Rene Koopman, piano
  Tim Goodwin, bass
  Tom Lenardo, drums
- 12. Reed Between The Lines
  Carl Wolfe, saxophone
  Carl Wolfe Quartet, band
- 13. Reekin' With Love
  Di Anne Price, vocals
  Jim Spake, tenor saxophone
  Tim Goodwin, bass
  Tom Lenardo, drums
- DISC TWO - The New Memphis Jazz Collection, volume two
- 1. Gentle Rain
  Teresa Pate, vocals
  Teresa Pate band
- 2. 2nd & Beale
  Freeworld
- 3. Crazy She Calls Me
  Gary Johns, vocals
  Gene Rush, piano
  Errol Thomas, bass
  Tom Lenardo, drums
- 4. El Gato De La Noche
  The Memphis Jazz Orchestra
- 5. I Got It Bad...
  Gene Rush
  Tim Goodwin, bass
  Renardo Ward, drums
- 6. Waltz for Debbie
  The University of Memphis Jazz Singers, Tim Goodwin - director
- 7. School Girl Crush
  Candice Ivory Band
- 8. Voodoo Village
  Pat Register, saxophone
  Kurt Clayton, keyboards
  Niko Lyras, keyboards
  Ernest Williams, keyboards
  Dave Smith, bass
  Edward Cleveland, drums
- 9. Out of This World
  Kelley Hurt, vocals/arranger
  Doug Garrison, percussion/drums
  Chris Parker, piano/arranger
  Jonathan Wires, bass
- 10. River of Jive
  Charlie Wood, vocals/keyboard/organ
  Tom Clary, trumpet and horn arrangements
  Scott Thompson, trumpet and flugelhorn
  Fred Ford, alto sax
  Tom Clary, trumpet and horn arrangements
  Jim Spake, tenor sax
  Joey Moore, bass
  David Forrester, drums
  Steve Wenger, guitar
- 11. Local Edition
  Jack Cooper, alto saxophone/composer
  Alvie Givhan, piano
  Tim Goodwin, bass
  Don Patterson, drums

Di Anne Price passed in March 2013.

Charlie Wood is married to Jacqui Dankworth and has moved to London since the release of this CD set. He still retains a CD contract with Archer Records in Memphis, TN.

- DISC THREE - Big Band Reflections of Cole Porter, Jazz Orchestra of the Delta
  Please refer to the Personnel Section on that Wikipedia/CD page.

=== Production ===
- Producer: John Threadgill
- Co-producer: Jack Cooper
- Manufactured: John Phillips, Select-O-Hits,
- Mastered: L. Nix, Ardent Studios, Memphis, TN.
- Graghic design & concept: Blake Franklin, Street Level Graphics, Memphis, TN.
- Liner notes: Jack Cooper
- Discs 1 and 2 - All tracks compiled by Jack Cooper
- Disc 3 - All tracks composed or arranged and produced by Jack Cooper

== Promotion ==
The CD release party was held in AutoZone Park on March 18, 2004, at 5:30 pm., in the upper club room convention/party level: it was promoted well and The Commercial Appeal as well as the Memphis Business Journal. The box was conceived through cooperation of the nonprofit Mid-south Jazz Foundation, the Greater Memphis Chamber of Commerce, the Shelby County/Memphis Music Commission, the University of Memphis School of Music, and Select-O-Hits. Numerous artists from the CD set performed at the event, it was well attended and sponsored by the Greater Memphis Chamber of Commerce. Interviews were done on WKNO-FM 91.1 and WUMR with the producer of the set, the tracks from the set have had extensive play on WUMR radio which is the jazz radio station for the Mid-South region. It has also had airplay on other jazz radio stations around the country.

== Reception ==
Professional ratings
Review scores
Source	Rating
The Commercial Appeal	4.5/5 stars
DISC 3 - L.A. Jazz Scene	(very positive)
DISC 3 - Jazz Journal International	(very positive)

- All Discs

"A new collection, The Memphis Jazz Box, states with classy pride the case for the Bluff City's jazz heritage, notably those currently working on the local scene...The box stands as a fine effort, a nice cross-section..."

Bill Ellis, Commercial Appeal

- Disc #3

"...the result is a cohesive ensemble that understands (the) musical direction so well that they reproduce precisely what (the arranger) has intended...Balance and phrasing, suitable textures, and mellow harmonic ties follow with glamorous effects."

Jim Santella, L.A. Jazz Scene

"...(the arranger) is to be congratulated on the way he orchestrated some of (Porter's) best known songs, maintaining interest, despite the familiarity with the material."

Gordon Jack, Jazz Journal International

== Sources and external links ==
- The Memphis Jazz Box at AllMusic
- The Memphis Jazz Box at Discogs
- The Memphis Jazz Box at MusicBrainz
- The Protagonist on YouTube
- OCLC 70659608
