= WEVL =

Coordinates: 35°09′12″N 89°59′31″W

- Memphis, Tennessee; United States
- Frequency: 89.9 MHz
- Branding: 89.9 WEVL

Programming
- Format: Freeform

Ownership
- Owner: Southern Communication Volunteers, Inc.

History
- First air date: 1976
- Call sign meaning: Volunteer

Technical information
- Licensing authority: FCC
- Class: C3
- ERP: 4,800 watts
- HAAT: 116 meters (381 ft)

Links
- Public license information: Public file; LMS
- Website: wevl.org

WEVL (89.9 FM) is a Memphis, Tennessee, radio station with a freeform format. It airs live in Memphis and online.

== Awards ==
- WEVL voted "Best FM Station" in Memphis Flyer's "Best of Memphis" 2007 poll.
- WEVL takes second place for Best FM Station in the Memphis Flyer's 2006 Best of Memphis Poll

== Notable personalities ==
- Joyce Cobb
- Dee "Cap'n Pete" Henderson
- "Bashful Bob"
- Jim "The Ol' Ridge Runner" Lillard

== See also ==
- List of community radio stations in the United States
