= Lance Green =

Lance Green is an English-born trombonist living and working in Scotland. His father, Roy, was a musician in the Royal Air Force, and Lance showed great promise as a trombone player from an early age. He played with the band of RAF Innsworth and assisted many lesser players with their musical tuition.

== Educational input ==
As well as teaching the trombone at university level, Green contributes to the education of younger trombonists by attending the annual "side-by-side" event arranged between the Royal Scottish National Orchestra and the West of Scotland Schools Orchestra Trust . He also participates in various Brass Masterclasses for the same organisation.

== Discography ==
There are hundreds of recordings by the Royal Scottish National Orchestra available for purchase, mainly from the Naxos Label. Lance Green appears in many of these as Principal Trombone. The most notable recording featuring Lance with the Royal Scottish National Orchestra is Mahler's 3rd Symphony in which he plays the trombone solo. Green also appears on the American, Summit Records release Big Band Reflections of Cole Porter, he recorded with the Jazz Orchestra of the Delta while he was on a years sabbatical in Memphis TN from the RSNO.
