= Joyce Cobb =

American jazz and R&B singer

- Born: Joyce Renee Cobb; June 2, 1945 (age 81); Okmulgee, Oklahoma, U.S.
- Genres: Jazz, blues, R&B, folk, gospel, traditional pop
- Occupations: Singer, songwriter
- Years active: 1967–present
- Labels: Truth, Stax, Cream, RCA, Polydor, Select-O-Hits, Archer

Joyce Renee Cobb (born June 2, 1945) is an American singer specializing in jazz and R&B. She is closely associated with traditional blues and jazz in the style of Memphis Minnie, Bessie Smith, Billie Holiday, and Sarah Vaughan. She has had a wide-ranging career as a solo artist and vocalist, having charted several country, pop, and R&B singles in the 1970s and early 1980s, later recording as a jazz vocalist.

== Biography ==
=== Early years (1945-71) ===
Joyce Cobb was born on June 2, 1945, in Okmulgee, Oklahoma, and first sang in her grandmother's church. In 1955 her family moved to Nashville, Tennessee, when her father was hired at Tennessee State University as the head of the Health and physical education department. Her parents owned a large record collection of music that was influential on her at a young age. Her first vocal training during that time was at Cathedral of the Incarnation, during grade and high school. This mainly consisted of singing requiems and pontifical high masses. She sang in the girls' glee club and choir during that time; also; Cobb had 14 years of private piano training. From 1963 to 1967 she attended Central State University and acquired an undergraduate degree in Social Welfare.

Her professional music career started in Dayton, Ohio, singing with different blues and jazz bands. While pursuing a master's degree at Wright State University in social work by day, she was singing in clubs at night. She was offered a road gig singing in duo with Bill Temme for Ramada Inn hotels and quit pursuing a vocation as a social worker to become a professional singer and songwriter. Between 1969 and 1971 Cobb was on Ramada Inn's Midwest circuit for entertainment, performing in duo under the title Joyce and William [Temme] Duo both singing and playing guitars.

=== Nashville (1971–75) ===
After two and a half years working for the Ramada hotel chain she returned to Nashville in 1971 and worked in a variety of musical genres appearing at Opryland, on radio, and on television. She was one of the first acts at Opryland USA in 1972 and was voted "Best Performer" in 1974. She became a regular fixture on WSM-AM radio's The Waking Crew with Ralph Emery, in addition to the Ralph Emery Show on NBC affiliate WSMV-TV, broadcasting out of Nashville. She also was a regular guest on Teddy Bart's The Noon Show, also on WSM-TV. During that time she had cut her first single for the Truth Records label and was first nationally recognized in the May 1975 edition of Billboard with her single "He Just Loved You Out Of Me" in the "Best potential hit" list. This first country music single was to launch her career, it was the last time she would record in that genre.

=== Memphis (1976–91) ===
Due to her earlier success in country music with a promising hit single, in 1976 she was signed with Stax Records and put under contract. Unfortunately the label was in decline at this time: Cobb in fact would be the last artist signed to Stax as the label went out of business shortly after she moved to Memphis. She stayed in the city due to the difference and diversity in musical styles she was now exposed to as compared to her initial professional work in Nashville, "...everything was Black---Black music, Black bands. I said, 'Oh, I want to stay here.'" it was during this period that Jake Schorr invited her to perform every week at Jefferson Square, a popular, downtown music venue. From here, her audience grew and her style flourished as her career continued to evolve.

Shortly after her move to Memphis, Al Bennett acquired Hi Records in 1977; Cobb then become an artist for Bennett's Cream Records. Cream produced a different set of artists than Cobb started with in Nashville, they had a solid reputation making soul, R&B, and disco recordings. With Cream, she first recorded a Top 40 hit single in 1979 with her original tune Dig The Gold. It was distributed in North America under for the Cream label and sold in Europe under the Polydor label. The single showed her versatility as both a performer and writer; a reggae style song that was put to a funk/disco beat. Dig The Gold charted to #42 for Billboard and #10 for Cashbox giving her a first real success as an internationally recognized pop artist.

With her reputation growing as a contemporary pop singer and writer who could handle a variety of styles, she was contracted by Atlantic Records to record with the Toronto-based disco group T.H.P. Orchestra. She recorded as the lead, solo vocalist on T.H.P.'s last studio album: Good To Me. The LP would end up charting at #16 in the dance category for Billboard. The next year she had another release which charted for 6 weeks with Billboard topping out at #90 for Cream in the R&B category: How Glad I Am. She was honored as being #4 in the December edition (for 1980) Billboard End of the Year Awards list for New Female Single Pop Artist in the company of singers Irene Cara (#1), Charlie Dore (#2), and Bernadette Peters (#3). She was the opening act for Al Jarreau and The Temptations during this time.

During the 1980s she recorded a number of records under contract with Willie Mitchell on his Waylo Records label. From 1984 to 1987 she recorded several singles, one of which made it to #3 on the British R&B charts: her earlier success with Dig The Gold paved the way for that single to chart well overseas. She toured internationally in the Netherlands with Waylo artist Otis Clay to promote the label and current releases for both artists. It was even rumored in Nashville and Memphis that she would return to her earlier successes recording country music but that never materialized with either the Cream or Waylo record labels.

=== Joyce Cobb's club, Beale Street, and more (1992-present) ===
1992 through 1996 she was honored with a music venue/jazz club on Beale Street under her name, Joyce Cobb's. She is the only woman to have a club named after her on the street while also honored by having a brass note on the Beale Street Walk of Fame. The club had a measure of success when starting out featuring musical acts such as George Coleman, Jimmy McGriff, Herb Ellis, Marvin Stamm, James Williams, and Maria Muldaur. Unfortunately the venue only lasted four years due to the financial viability being less than expected, ending up getting bought out by another club owner. It was then in 1996 she was honored with the installment of her brass note on the Beale Street Walk of Fame. She also toured the United States and Europe with the highly acclaimed Beale Street Jazz Band, recording two CDs with the group during this time.

Starting in 1997 Cobb served as the co-host with Sam the Sham on the nationally syndicated radio program Beale Street Caravan broadcasting on over 260 stations in North America and worldwide over the Armed Forces Radio Network. Since 1983 she has had her own radio show on WEVL Memphis presenting blues, jazz, and cutting edge American jazz vocalists.

The TV show Sounds of Memphis was premiered on WKNO (PBS) in 1995 and was modeled after Austin City Limits; Cobb was featured on this show and it brought her back into a national spotlight. Though the show did not go past four episodes it did propel her into further musical prominence.

In the late 1990s she forwarded the concept of Sounds of Memphis to help write the script for the show Beale Street Saturday Night which it has had success as a live show in the mid-part of the country. This was her first in-road to what has been an acting career later in her professional life. In 2006 she recorded on the soundtrack of Black Diamonds: The Story of Negro League Baseball as part of the internationally recognized exhibit presented at the Memphis Pink Palace Museum. In the last 16 years Cobb has been the lead actress and singer for numerous award-winning live productions to include Ain’t Misbehavin, Lady Day at the Emerson Bar and Grill and The Devil's Music: The Life and Times of Bessie Smith.

Cobb was contacted by Ward Archer in 2009 to record a CD for his recently formed Memphis record label, Archer Records. It was her first solo recording as a jazz artist and again showed her versility and artistry as a recording artist. In 2010 she toured Europe with the Michael Jefry Stevens Trio promoting the CD release for Archer Records. Presently she continues to perform every Sunday in Memphis, Tennessee at Bosco's as well as playing many other engagements internationally. She has also seen the re-issue on CD (digital re-master) of her earlier successes with How Glad I Am on a compilation in 2012 and T.H.P.'s album in 2013.

== Musical style and music educator ==
Cobb's musical style is derived from but does not mimic blues and jazz singers such as Bessie Smith, Billie Holiday, Ella Fitzgerald, and Sarah Vaughan (among others). She is a scat singer and improvisor. Her musical background has been diverse having sung country, disco, R&B, soul and jazz." Joyce Cobb's big, voice can interpret everything from pop to country to classical to her truest love, jazz."

Cobb is a very pro-active advocate of music education and the history of singing style in American pop and jazz music. She has served for close 20 years as adjunct vocal professor at the University of Memphis School of Music, and worked with younger jazz vocalists and musicians at the Stax Music Academy.

== Awards and honors ==
- New Female Single Pop Artist, End of the Year Awards list, Billboard magazine, 1980
- Best Female Singer, Memphis Chapter of NARAS, 1986, 1988, 1997
- Best Female Entertainer, Beale Street Merchants Association, 1995
- Honorary doctorate in music, Grand Valley State University, 1995
- Music Pioneer, United Music Heritage, 2000
- Initiative award, Women of Achievement, 2000
- Emissary of Music, Memphis and Shelby County Music Commission, 2009
- HEBE Award, Memphis Symphony League, 2009
- Best Vocalist, Memphis Flyer readers' poll, 2011 and 2012

== Discography ==
Year	Single or individual cut off a compilation	Album	Video	Primary artist Lead singer Background singer Composer	Type	Label	Billboard	Cashbox	Review, ranking
1975	"He Just Loved; You Out of Me"			Primary artist	Studio	Truth Records	Best potential hit (May)		
1975	"Lonesome Time; In Memphis Town Tonight"			Primary artist	Studio	Truth Records			
1979		Good To Me (with THP)		Lead singer	Studio	Atlantic/RCA	#16 (dance)		
1979	"Dig The Gold"			Primary artist Composer	Studio	Cream Records	#42; 12 weeks	#72 (pop)	
1979	"Don't Be Mad At Me"			Primary artist Composer	Studio	Cream Records			
1980	"How Glad I Am"			Primary artist Composer	Studio	Cream Records	Adult Contemporary Pick #107 (pop); 6 weeks #90 (R & B); 3 weeks		
1980	"That's What Love Will Do"			Primary artist Composer	Studio	Cream Records			
1981	"It Really Doesn't Matter"			Primary artist Composer	Studio	Cream Records			
1981	"Let The Music Play"			Primary artist Composer	Studio	Cream Records			
1981	"Take My Heart, Take My Soul"			Primary artist Composer	Studio	Cream Records			
1982		Alethea (Alethea, Nikko Lyrus)		Lead singer	Studio	Lomo			
1987	"Another Lonely Night (Without You)"			Primary artist Composer	Studio	Waylo			#3; U.K. R&B; 12 weeks
1987	"Love Can"			Primary artist Composer	Studio	Waylo			
1987	"Slippin' Away" (cassette tape)			Primary artist Composer	Studio	Waylo			
1990			"Blues Alive" (compilation)	Lead singer	Studio	Diamond Time			
1992	"You've Been A Good Ol' Wagon"	Blues Alive (compilation)		Lead singer	Studio	BMG			
1997		"Of Moons And Fools" (Tommy Hoehn)		Background vocals	Studio	Frankenstein			
1997		Jazzin' On Beale (Beale Street; Jazz Band)		Lead singer	Studio	BOO Records			CA
1998	"The First Noel"	The Sounds of Starry Nights (compilation)		Lead singer	Studio	Metropolitan Inter-Faith Association			
1999		Outstanding On Beale Street (Beale Street; Jazz Band)		Lead singer	Studio	BOO Records			CA
2003	"Steal Away"	The Memphis Belles: Past, Present, and Future (compilation)		Lead singer	Live	Inside Sounds			
2003	"Beale Street Blues"	The Memphis; Jazz Box (compilation)		Primary artist	Studio	Ice House Records			CA
2003	"Memphis In June"	In The Mood for Memphis (compilation)		Primary artist	Studio	Inside Sounds			
2003		"Beale Street Saturday Night"		Primary artist	Studio	Center for Southern Folklore			CA
2008	"This Joint Is Jumpin"	The Memphis Belles; Jazz Collection (compilation)		Primary artist	Studio	Inside Sounds			
2010		Joyce Cobb with the Michael Jefry Stevens Trio		Primary artist	Studio	Archer Records			CA
2012	"How Glad I Am"	2 Steps To Soul Heaven: More 70's An 80's Steppers (compilation)		Primary artist	Studio	Ais			
2013		Disco Recharge: Tender Is the Night/ Good to Me (Re-issue, T.H.P. Orchestra)		Lead singer	Studio	Harmless Records			

== Bibliography ==
- DeCosta-Willis, Miriam. Notable Black Memphians (2008), Cambria Press, Amherst, NY, ISBN 978-1-60497-505-5. pp. 90–92.
- Elkington, John. Beale Street: Resurrecting the Home of the Blues, History Press. ISBN 978-1596294929, pp. 89
- Geran, Paul. Woman with Guitar: Memphis Minnie's Blues (1992), Da Capo Press, p. 86
- Handy, D. Antoinette. Black Women in American Bands and Orchestras, (1998), Scarecrow Press, ISBN 978-0810834194, pp. 123–24.
- Herzhaft, Gérard. Encyclopedia of the Blues (1997), University of Arkansas Press, ISBN 978-1557284525, pp. 137, 235.
- Lisle, Andria. Evans, Mike. Waking up in Memphis (2003), Sanctuary Publishing. ISBN 978-1860744471, pp. 82–84
- Joyce Cobb: Deeply rooted in the blues, jazz and gospel Jazzpodium, 10 (2010), pp. 9
