= Ella Fitzgerald Sings the Cole Porter Song Book =

Studio album by Ella Fitzgerald
- Released: May 15, 1956
- Recorded: February 7–9, 1956; March 27, 1956
- Genres: Swing; big band
- Length: 118:27
- Label: Verve
- Producer: Norman Granz

Ella Fitzgerald chronology
Sweet and Hot (1955)	Ella Fitzgerald Sings the Cole Porter Song Book (1956)	Ella and Louis (1956)

Professional ratings
Review scores
Source	Rating
AllMusic	4.5/5 stars
The Encyclopedia of Popular Music	5/5 stars
The Penguin Guide to Jazz Recordings	4/4 stars
The Rolling Stone Jazz Record Guide	4/5 stars

Ella Fitzgerald Sings the Cole Porter Song Book is a 1956 studio double album by American jazz singer Ella Fitzgerald, accompanied by a studio orchestra conducted and arranged by Buddy Bregman, focusing on the songs of Cole Porter. It is the first in a series of thematic LPs devoted to great American songwriters that Fitzgerald recorded from 1956 to 1964.

== Background ==
This was Fitzgerald's first album for the newly created Verve Records (and the first album to be released by the label). Norman Granz, Fitzgerald's manager and the producer of many of her albums, decided to have her record well-established popular works because

I was interested in how I could enhance Ella's position, to make her a singer with more than just a cult following amongst jazz fans. So I proposed to Ella that the first Verve album would not be a jazz project, but rather a song book of the works of Cole Porter. I envisaged her doing a lot of composers. The trick was to change the backing enough so that, here and there, there would be signs of jazz.

Fitzgerald's time on the Verve label would see her produce her most highly acclaimed recordings, at the peak of her vocal powers. This album inaugurated Fitzgerald's Song Book series, each of the eight albums in the series focusing on a different composer of the canon known as the Great American Songbook. The album was recorded February 7–9 and March 27, 1956, in Hollywood, Los Angeles.

Granz visited Cole Porter at the Waldorf-Astoria and played him this entire album. Afterwards, Porter merely remarked, "My, what marvelous diction that girl has."

== Legacy and achievements ==
This album was inducted into the Grammy Hall of Fame in 2000, which is a special Grammy award established in 1973 to honor recordings that are at least twenty-five years old, and that have "qualitative or historical significance." In 2003, it was one of 50 recordings chosen by the Library of Congress to be added to the National Recording Registry.

In 2000 it was voted number 490 in Colin Larkin's All Time Top 1000 Albums.

== Track listing ==
All tracks written by Cole Porter, except when noted.

=== Disc one ===
Side one

1. "All Through the Night" – 3:15
2. "Anything Goes" – 3:21
3. "Miss Otis Regrets" – 3:00
4. "Too Darn Hot" – 3:47
5. "In the Still of the Night" – 2:38
6. "I Get a Kick Out of You" – 4:00
7. "Do I Love You?" – 3:50
8. "Always True to You in My Fashion" – 2:48

Side two

9. "Let's Do It, Let's Fall in Love" – 3:32
10. "Just One of Those Things" – 3:30
11. "Ev'ry Time We Say Goodbye" – 3:32
12. "All of You" – 1:43
13. "Begin the Beguine" – 3:37
14. "Get Out of Town" – 3:22
15. "I Am in Love" – 4:06
16. "From This Moment On" – 3:17

=== Disc two ===
Side three

1. "I Love Paris" – 4:57
2. "You Do Something to Me" – 2:21
3. "Ridin' High" – 3:20
4. "You'd Be So Easy to Love" – 3:24
5. "It's All Right with Me" – 3:07
6. "Why Can't You Behave?" – 5:04
7. "What Is This Thing Called Love?" – 2:02
8. "You're the Top" – 3:33

Side four

9. "Love for Sale" – 5:52
10. "It's De-Lovely" – 2:42
11. "Night and Day" – 3:04
12. "Ace in the Hole" – 1:58
13. "So in Love" – 3:50
14. "I've Got You Under My Skin" – 2:42
15. "I Concentrate on You" – 3:11
16. "Don't Fence Me In" – 3:19 (Robert Fletcher, co-lyricist)

1997 reissue, previously unreleased bonus tracks

17. "You're the Top" (Alternative take) – 2:08
18. "I Concentrate on You" (Alternative take) – 3:00
19. "Let's Do It, Let's Fall in Love" (Alternative take) – 5:25

== Personnel ==
Personnel adapted from the liner notes of CD reissue.

Performance

- Ella Fitzgerald – vocals
- Paul Smith – piano, celeste (on all tracks except 2.11)

Brass and woodwind members
(on tracks 1.1–2, 4–5, 8, 10, 13, 16, 2.2–3, 5, 8–13, 15)

- Herb Geller – clarinet, alto saxophone
- Chuck Gentry – bass clarinet, baritone saxophone
- Bud Shank – clarinet, flute, alto saxophone

Additional members on 1.7, 11, 15, 2.1, 6

- Bob Cooper – clarinet, oboe, tenor saxophone
- Ted Nash – clarinet, flute, tenor saxophone

Additional members on 1.12

- Pete Candoli – trumpet
- Harry "Sweets" Edison – trumpet
- Maynard Ferguson – trumpet
- Conrad Gozzo – trumpet

Additional members on 1.12, 2.7 & 14

- Milt Bernhart – trombone
- Joe Howard – trombone
- Lloyd Ulyate – trombone
- George Roberts – bass and baritone trombone

Rhythm members
(on all tracks except 1.3, 8, 2.2, 8, 12)

- Barney Kessel – Guitar
- Joe Mondragon – Double bass
- Alvin Stoller – Drums, percussion

String Players (Incomplete)
(on tracks 1.1–2, 5, 7–8, 11, 13, 15, 2.1–2, 6, 8–13, 15)

- Corky Hale – harp
- Robert LaMarchina – cello
- Edgar Lustgarten – cello

Technical

- Buddy Bregman – arranger, conductor
- Norman Granz – producer

Reissue

- Suha Gur – mastering
- Michael Lang – producer
- Fred W. Meyer – mastering

== Charts ==
=== Monthly charts ===
Monthly chart performance for Ella Fitzgerald Sings the Cole Porter Song Book
Chart (2026)	Peak position
German Jazz Albums (Offizielle Top 100)	9

== Release history ==
Date	Format	Label	Catalog No.
1956	12" 2xLP	Verve	MG V-4001-2
1976	12" 2xLP	Verve	VE-2-2511
1997	CD 2xLP (remastered)	Verve Master Edition	314 537 257-2
2017	FLAC 24-bit/96 kHz	Verve Records	
