= Out of the Bluffs =

Out Of The Bluffs

Studio album by University of Memphis Southern Comfort Jazz Orchestra
- Released: Nov 10, 2009
- Recorded: December 5, 2007; April 10/11, 2008
- Genres: Jazz, big band
- Length: 65:00
- Labels: University of Memphis; Select-O-Hits
- Producer: Jack Cooper

University of Memphis Southern Comfort Jazz Orchestra chronology
Voices (2007)	Out Of The Bluffs (2009)
- cat # UMR 7368

Audio sample
- "Out Of The Bluffs": file; help

Out Of The Bluffs is a 2009 compact disc by the University of Memphis Southern Comfort Jazz Orchestra recorded in the studio. This was their 2nd CD release since 2007. Since the late 1960s this group has been consistently recognized as one of the top collegiate jazz ensembles in the country recently being invited to the 2011 Jazz Education Network Convention, the 2000 International Association for Jazz Education Convention, and touring Europe in 1998. Musicians from this CD and program won the 2007 University of South Florida Michael Brecker Arranging Competition (David Peoples) and others went on to study with Bob Brookmeyer at the New England Conservatory of Music, Manhattan School of Music, and also work professionally at universities and major symphony orchestras.

== Background ==
The University of Memphis Southern Comfort Jazz Orchestra CD Out Of The Bluffs was recorded to present a wide range of music to include tunes arranged of past University of Memphis alumni Mulgrew Miller and James Williams. Two tracks consisting of jazz classics from Bill Russo and Thad Jones are included; this displays the band's capabilities on historic repertoire of the jazz orchestra. Dating back to the 1960s this group has a long history of high level jazz alumni and continues to build on that tradition with this recording. U of M Jazz Orchestra alumni include James Williams, Mulgrew Miller, Tony Reedus, Donald Brown, Bill Easley, and Bill Mobley.

== Reception ==
Professional ratings
Review scores
Source	Rating
All About Jazz	Very favorable review

"Out of the Bluffs displays the Southern Comfort Jazz Orchestra in the best possible light, and is recommended as a high-class model of the kind of music that contemporary college-level Jazz ensembles are capable of producing."

Jack Bowers, All About Jazz

== Track listing ==
Track Listing:

No.	Title	Length
1.	"A Beautiful Friendship (Kahn/Styne, arr. Chris Parker)"	8:38
2.	"Alter Ego (James Williams, arr. Justin Cockerham)"	6:14
3.	"Out Of The Bluffs (David Peoples)"	5:54
4.	"Without Changes (Mary Ann McSweeney, arr. David Peoples)"	7:14
5.	"Low-Down (Thad Jones)"	4:47
6.	"The Necessary Blonde (Gary Willis, arr. Jack Cooper)"	6:25
7.	"Portrait Of A Count (Bill Russo)"	4:52
8.	"For Those Who Do (Mulgrew Miller, arr. Matt Tutor)"	9:22
9.	"The Burren (Mike Fahn, arr. Chris Parker)"	7:06
10.	"Tricrotism (Oscar Pettiford, arr. Jack Cooper)"	4:51
Total length:		65:00

== Recording Sessions ==
- December 5, 2007 at the University of Memphis, STUDIOS A/B
- April 10/11, 2008 at the University of Memphis, STUDIOS A/B

== Musicians ==
- (1) Recorded December 5, 2007 at the University of Memphis, STUDIOS A/B
- Conductor - Dr. Jack Cooper
- 1st alto saxophone - Justin Johnson
- 2nd alto saxophone – Jeremy Lewis
- 1st tenor saxophone - Josh McClain
- 2nd tenor saxophone - Andrew Traylor
- Baritone saxophone - Justin Brown
- Lead trumpet/flugelhorn- Ken Wendt
- 2nd trumpet/flugelhorn – Kevin Price
- 3rd trumpet/flugelhorn – Randy Ballard
- 4th trumpet/flugelhorn – Ben Pierre-Louis
- 5th trumpet/flugelhorn - Paul McKinney
- Lead trombone - Anthony Williams (lead)
- 2nd trombone - Victor Sawyer
- 3rd trombone - Ed Morse
- 4th trombone (Portrait of a Count) – David Dick
- Bass trombone - Lauren Watson
- Piano - Justin Cockerham
- Bass - Takahiro Morooka
- Drums - Jeremy Warren, Micah Lewis
- (2) Recorded April 10/11, 2008 at the University of Memphis, STUDIOS A/B
- Conductor - Dr. Jack Cooper
- 1st alto saxophone – Walter Hoehn
- 2nd alto saxophone – Jeremy Lewis
- 1st tenor saxophone - Josh McClain
- 2nd tenor saxophone - Andrew Traylor
- Baritone saxophone – Justin Brown
- Lead trumpet/flugelhorn - Ken Wendt
- 2nd trumpet/flugelhorn - Kevin Price
- 3rd trumpet/flugelhorn - Randy Ballard
- 4th trumpet/flugelhorn – Charles Ray
- 5th trumpet/flugelhorn - Ben Pierre-Louis
- 1st Horn (Beautiful Friendship only)- Abby Kattentidt
- 2nd Horn (Beautiful Friendship only)- Jon Schallert
- Lead trombone - Anthony Williams
- 2nd trombone - Victor Sawyer
- 3rd trombone - David Dick
- 3rd trombone - Ed Morse
- Bass trombone- Lauren Watson
- Piano - Justin Cockerham
- Bass - Takahiro Morooka
- Drums - Jeremy Warren/Michah Lewis

Chip Henderson serves as a guest soloist on Alter Ego

=== Production ===
- Producer: Jack Cooper
- Co-jazz instructor of rhythm sections and groups for CD: Tim Goodwin
- Co-producer, mixing, editing, and additional recording: David Peoples
- Recording engineer: Jon Frazer
- Recording assistants: Jacob Fly, Mark Sylvester, Charles Glover, James Antoine, Cory Hawley, David Deleon.
- Mastering: Mark Yoshida at Audiographic Masterworks, Memphis, TN
- Photographs: Kay Yager, Josh McLain, David Bradford
- Piano technician: Scott Higgins
- Artwork: Carol Morse
- Manufactured: John Phillips, Select-O-Hits
- Liner notes: Jack Cooper

== Works from the compact disc ==
Low-down is published by Kendor Music, Inc./BMI

Portrait of a Count is published by Sierra Music, ASCAP
