= Big Band Reflections of Cole Porter =

Studio album by Jazz Orchestra of the Delta Jack Cooper and various artists
- Released: June 3, 2003
- Recorded: November 2000–January 2002
- Studios: Phillips Recording, Memphis, Tennessee; University of Memphis
- Genres: Jazz, big band, vocal, instrumental
- Length: 38:39
- Label: Summit Records DCD 362
- Producer: Jack Cooper

Jazz Orchestra of the Delta chronology
Big Band Reflections of Cole Porter (2003)	Memphis Jazz Box (2004)

Jack Cooper chronology
Standard Deviations (2003)	Big Band Reflections of Cole Porter (2003)	The Chamber Wind Music of Jack Cooper (2010)

Audio sample
- "Two In Love": file; help

Audio sample
- "Night And Day": file; help

Audio sample
- "So In Love": file; help

Big Band Reflections of Cole Porter is the first studio album by the Jazz Orchestra of the Delta and features trumpeter Marvin Stamm and vocalist Sandra Dudley, this was released in June 2003 on the Summit Records jazz label. The CD has been extensively reviewed across the United States and the U.K. and garnered consistently high praise from critics as well as charting for over 6 months on JazzWeek Airplay Reporting. The album is also included in the three CD set The Memphis Jazz Box in 2004 as a part of the contemporary jazz scene in Memphis, Tennessee and the Mid-South region.

== Background ==
After the Jazz Orchestra of the Delta was established in 1998 the group and musical director were afforded an opportunity by Summit Records to collaborate on a jazz release for the label. Two things were required by Summit: a theme and a guest artist. The theme of Cole Porter's music fit well due to a recent Cole Porter tribute with Sandra Dudley the ensemble had performed, native Memphian Marvin Stamm was picked as the guest artist for the release. There were two failed recording sessions for the release due to severe weather problems and power outages, this delayed the completion of the CD for about 18 months.

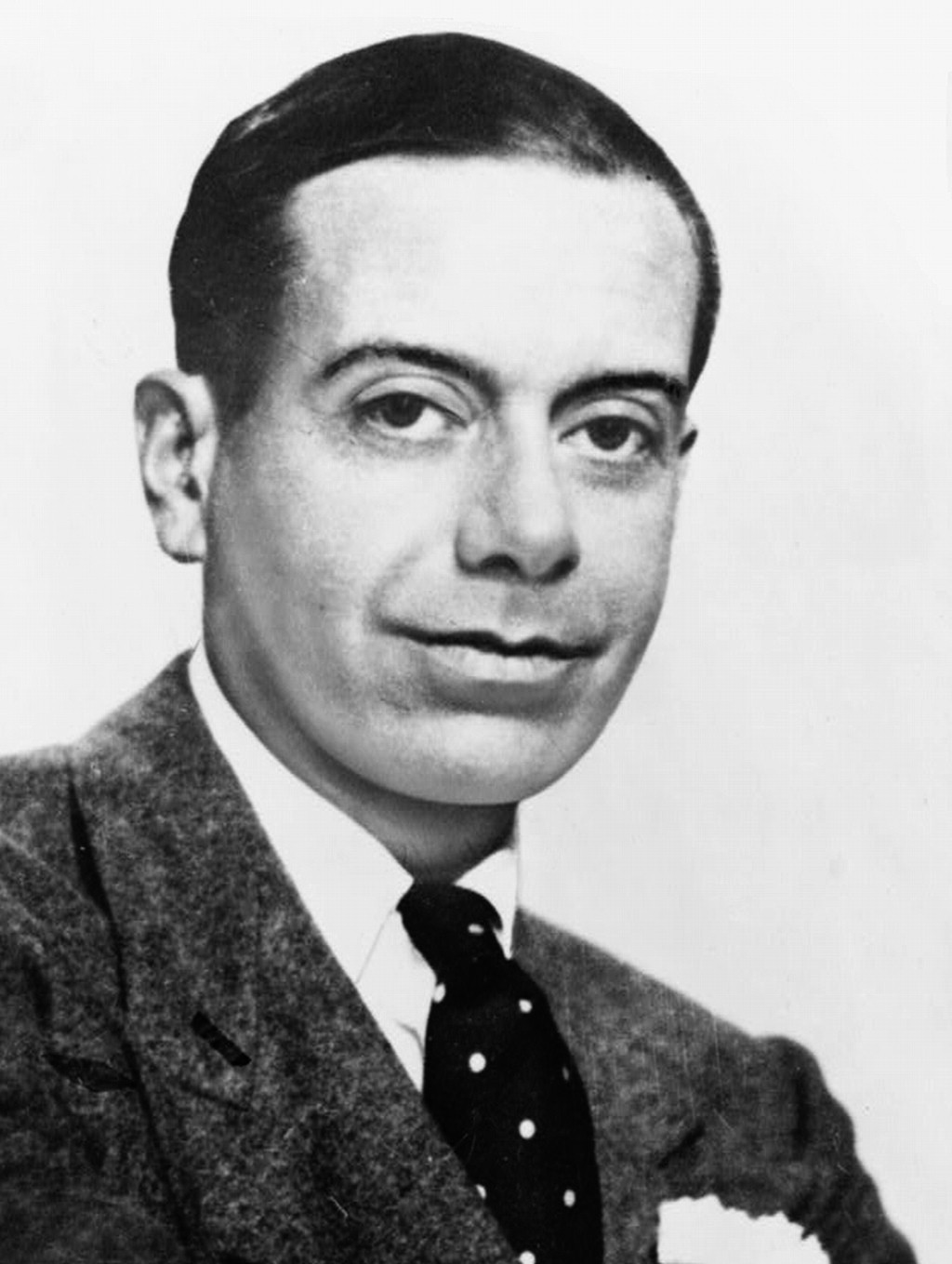
Porter's music has been utilized on hundreds of jazz recordings to include Big Band Reflections of Cole Porter (Porter in the 1930s)

Most recently the entire album was featured on Scott Ellsworth's long running Scott's Place jazz radio show for February 2, 2019.

== Track listing ==
All tracks are written by Cole Porter (except track #4 by Peter Erskine and #8 by Jack Cooper), all selections arranged for jazz orchestra by Jack Cooper.

No.	Title	Length
1.	"It's All Right With Me"	4:16
2.	"Love For Sale"	5:11
3.	"Night and Day"	2:47
4.	"Twelve"	3:52
5.	"So In Love"	5:31
6.	"Ev'rything I Love"	5:17
7.	"From This Moment On"	3:07
8.	"Two In Love"	5:22
9.	"What Is This Thing Called Love?"	4:18
Total length:		38:39

- EP distributed in late 2003 by Summit Records featuring 'Night and Day' and 10 other artists/cuts from Summit Records for the year.

== Recording Sessions ==
- November 13, 2000
- December 11, 2000
- February 8, 2001
- June 25, 2001
- January, 2002

Recorded at Sam Phillips Recording Services and U of M STUDIOS A/B

== Personnel ==
=== Musicians ===
- Conductor: Jack Cooper
- Trumpet: Marvin Stamm
- Vocals: Sandra Dudley
- Saxes and woodwinds: John Lux, Mike Krepper, Tom Link, Andre Matlin, Jeff Huddleston, Michael Scott
- Trumpets and flugelhorns: David Spencer (lead), Reid McCoy, Ward Yager, Tom Clary
- Trombones: Greg Luscombe, Milton Aldana, Lance Green, Ken Spain, Jake Brumbaugh, Bill Flores (Bass Trb)
- Guitar: Kerry Movassagh
- Piano: Alvie Givhan, Gene Rush
- Bass: Tim Goodwin, Sam Shoup
- Drums: Bo Harris, James Sexton
- Latin percussion: Ed Murray

=== Production ===
- Recording engineer and digital transfers: Jeff Cline
- Recording engineer, (Phillips Recording): Roland Janes
- Mixing engineer(s): Danny Jones and Jack Cooper, at Aztec Studios, Bartlett, TN.
- Mastering: David Shirk, Sonorous Mastering
- Liner notes: Bob Curnow

== Promotion ==
On Tuesday evening, July 15, 2003, the Jazz Orchestra of the Delta held the CD release performance and party at the Gibson Guitar Factory & Showcase, one block South of Beale Street in downtown Memphis, TN. The evening was sponsored by the Mid-South Jazz Foundation and was highly successful with a sell out performance. Both Sandra Dudley and Marvin Stamm were in attendance for this performance so to showcase the selections from the recording. Marvin Stamm's improvisation on Twelve is published as a transcribed solo in the Charles Colin publication "The Marvin Stamm Project." An EP was distributed in late 2003 by Summit Records featuring 'Night and Day' and 10 other artists/cuts from Summit Records for the year.

== Reception ==
Professional ratings
Review scores
Source	Rating
Allmusic	4/5 stars
JazzTimes	(positive)
Jazz Connection Magazine	4/5 stars
All About Jazz (3)	3.5/5 stars 4.5/5 stars 4/5 stars
Jazzreview.com (2)	4/5 stars 5/5 stars
Commercial Appeal	4/5 stars
Jazz Journal International	(very positive)
Big Bands International	(positive)
Jazz Improv	(positive)
Jazz Education Journal	(very positive)
L.A. Jazz Scene	(very positive)
IAJRC Journal	(very positive)
Tennessee Jazz And Blues Society	(very positive)
Sensible Sound	(positive)
WGMC 90.1; Top 100 for 2003	#85

"...(The Jazz Orchestra of the Delta) delivers Big Band Reflections of Cole Porter, an album that is sure to delight fans of ambitious, lush big band music. Supplemented by singer Sandra Dudley and trumpeter Marvin Stamm, this is a beautifully arranged, executed, and produced album."

David Binder, Jazzreview.com

"...the result is a cohesive ensemble that understands (Cooper's) musical direction so well that they reproduce precisely what (he) has intended...Balance and phrasing, suitable textures, and mellow harmonic ties follow with glamorous effects."

Jim Santella, L.A. Jazz Scene

"...(the arranger) is to be congratulated on the way he orchestrated some of (Porter's) best known songs, maintaining interest, despite the familiarity with the material. So in Love comes from...probably Porter's best loved show and Ms. Dudley takes it at a super slow tempo that works brilliantly."

Gordon Jack, Jazz Journal International

"...(Cooper's) arrangements of the Porter standards are knockouts. Propulsive and sassy on an initial listen, revealing subtle shadings and intricate nuances upon repeated listening. Very forthright and mainstream. I might have guessed Don Sebesky as arranger on a blindfold test, for the clean lines and solid constructions that still allow plenty of room for creative soloing."

Dan McClenaghan, All About Jazz

== Charts ==
Year	Chart	Type	Song/Album	Peak Position	Chart Date
2003	JazzWeek Airplay Reporting	Album	Big Band Reflections of Cole Porter	88	August 22, 2003

== Release history ==
Region	Date	Label	Format
United States	June 3, 2003	Summit Records	CD, digital download
United Kingdom	January 12, 2015	Summit Records	CD, digital download
Germany	April 5, 2005	Summit Records	CD, digital download

== See also ==
- Jazz Orchestra of the Delta
- Jack Cooper
- Memphis Jazz Box
- Marvin Stamm
- List of jazz arrangers
