= Cream Records =

- Founded: 1970
- Founder: Al Bennett
- Country of origin: United States

Cream Records was an American record label started in 1970, by former Liberty Records head Al Bennett. In 1977, he acquired Hi Records which became a division of Cream. After Bennett died, it was run by his daughter Adalah Bennett Shaw until she died in 2009. After the death of Mrs. Shaw, the label is now run by her daughter Sarena Shaw, and long time business partner Don Wilson. Wilson a long time friend of Alvin and Adalah has been involved with Cream/Hi Records since the death of Mr. Bennett. With Cream Records, Snail (band) had a Billboard charting song, "The Joker" which charted at #93 in 1978. Joyce Cobb recorded a Top 40 hit single in 1979 with her original tune "Dig The Gold". The next year she had another release which charted for 6 weeks with Billboard topping out at #90 for Cream Records in the R&B category: '"How Glad I Am".

== See also ==
- List of record labels
