= Mr. Mack =

American rapper

- Also known as: Mr.865, Mack
- Born: Mack Williams Jr.
- Origin: Knoxville, Tennessee
- Genres: Rap
- Occupation: Rapper
- Instrument: Vocals
- Years active: 2000 - present
- Label: Universal Republic Records
- Website: www.myspace.com/mrmackbr

Mack Williams Jr. is a rap artist who performs under the name Mr. Mack. He was born in Alcoa, Tennessee, and graduated from Alcoa High School.

He had released several independent mixtapes prior to signing with Universal Republic Records. His biggest hit to date, the 2006 single "Where You From? (Da 865)", became a statewide anthem in the Tennessee rap scene. In 2007, "Where You From?" was featured on a compilation album, Preview Presents Greeting From Knoxville, released by Knoxnews.com.

Mr. Mack is currently working on his debut album Self Made. It is targeted for release in late fall. Mack has had several popular songs released on regional radio. He was also featured in the award winning documentary "East Tennessee Hard Hitters" directed by Shannon M. Grier and Blu Chez in 2009. He has many live videos on YouTube, as well as having been featured on the television and radio program Studio 865, broadcast by the University of Tennessee. Mr. Mack has released several projects recently including his latest album "BLOW" which is nominated for Album of the Year @ the 2012 SEA Awards. He also just released a new video "Think It Over" f/ Project Pat & Young Ralph directed by AXTION.
