= Snail (band) =

American musical band

- Origin: Santa Cruz, California, U.S.
- Genres: Rock
- Years active: 1967–present
- Members: Bob O'Neill (guitar); Ken Kraft (guitar); Craig Owens (bass); Jimmy Norris (drums)
- Website: snailrocks.com

Snail is an American rock band best known for their Billboard charting single, "The Joker". They toured nationally and shared the stage with Santana, Thin Lizzy, Sammy Hagar, Taj Mahal, and Iron Butterfly, as well as touring with Styx and The Doobie Brothers, among others. In 1978, the group performed on American Bandstand. The band has had various members but original members Bob O'Neill and Ken Kraft have remained throughout the band's history.

== History ==
Snail was formed in Santa Cruz in 1967 by Bob O'Neill (guitar, vocals), Ron Fillmore (drums), and Dave Kibbler (bass). Ken Kraft (guitar, vocals) joined the band in 1968. The band interchanged bass players and drummers, but O'Neill and Kraft have remained throughout the group's history. Ken Kraft (guitar/vocals), Bob O'Neill (guitar/vocals), Craig Owens (bass), and Jimmy Norris (drums) make up the current lineup.

Past bass players include Dave Kibbler, Howard Dumble, Jim Hampton Larry Hosford, Jack Register, Bret Bloomfield, and Tiran Porter. Past drummers include Ron Fillmore, Bob Aguirre, Jimmy Norris, Donny Baldwin, and Gary "killer" Andrijasevich. Dale Ockerman was also a longtime band member.

The band toured extensively in the late 1960s through the late 1970s, sharing the stage with such artists as The Chambers Brothers, Elvin Bishop The Doobie Brothers, West, Bruce and Laing, Thin Lizzy, Sammy Hagar, Styx, Charlie Daniels, Jerry Miller, and Iron Butterfly. They have performed at Winterland, the Carousel Ballroom, and the Fillmore West, among numerous other venues.

After performing for over ten years in the San Francisco Bay Area, Snail signed a record deal with Cream Records in 1977, making them one of the first bands from Santa Cruz to sign a major record deal. Cream Records launched an extensive radio campaign for the release of their debut album, Snail, which led to the group's album charting on Billboard's Top 200 Albums and its single, The Joker, charting at #93 on Billboard's Hot 100 in 1978. The album received favorable reviews and Billboard Magazine said that it was Cream Record's strongest rock release in some time. Their single, Tonight also received favorable reviews.

At the height of their career, Kraft suffered a near-fatal brain hemorrhage which took him a year to recover. The band renamed themselves, The Millionaires, as O'Neill stated that "Snail wasn't Snail without Kraft". But shortly after, members Bret Bloomfield (bass) and Donny Baldwin (drums) joined up with Starship.

The album cover from Snail's 1978 debut LP is featured prominently in the background, as one of the album covers on the wall in McConnell's Music store on the TV show Mork & Mindy.

Snail has reunited for concerts throughout the years and is performing as a band again, based in Santa Cruz, California.

== Discography ==
- 1978 - Snail
- 1979 - Flow
- 1996 - Let it Rock (live album)
- 2019 - Snail Now
- 2022 - Snail Rocks
