= WYXR =

Memphis, Tennessee; United States
- Frequency: 91.7 MHz

Programming
- Format: Freeform; eclectic

Ownership
- Owner: Crosstown Radio Partnership, Inc.

History
- First air date: 1974
- Former call signs: WSWM (1975–1979); WSMS (1979–1994); WUMR (1994–2020)

Technical information
- Licensing authority: FCC
- Facility ID: 66625
- Class: C2
- ERP: 25,000 watts
- HAAT: 120.0 meters (393.7 ft)
- Transmitter coordinates: 35°9′17.00″N 89°51′28.00″W

Links
- Public license information: Public file; LMS
- Website: www.wyxr.org

WYXR (91.7 FM) is an eclectic, non-profit community radio station headquartered in the historic Crosstown Concourse building in Memphis, Tennessee, United States. The station is owned by Crosstown Radio Partnership, Inc. and is a collaboration between Crosstown Concourse, the Daily Memphian and the University of Memphis.

The WYXR air room is located in the Central Atrium of Crosstown Concourse, where passersby can view inside the studio as shows are broadcast live. It officially started broadcasting on Monday, October 5, 2020.

== Programming ==
The programming is a mix of music, news, talk, arts, and culture with a focus on the Memphis area and features more than 90 volunteer disc jockeys, along with syndicated programs from the KUDZUKIAN Network, Beale Street Caravan and Thacker Mountain Radio.

The mission of WYXR, according to its licensee, is to provide a musical, cultural and artistic platform that represents and informs the people of Memphis. It streams live and archives shows on its website.

== History ==
The station was first signed on in 1974 as WSWM on what is now the Rhodes College campus. The radio station became WUMR 91.7 in 1979 and served as the University of Memphis broadcasting outlet, when Southwestern at Memphis (Rhodes College) sold one of its two radio licenses to then Memphis State University. It was created as an all-jazz format music station (WUMR "The Jazz Lover"), the only one of its kind in the Mid-South/Memphis metro region. During its 41-year history, WUMR was part of the University of Memphis College of Communication and Fine Arts (CCFA) Department of Communication. A key element of the station's mission was to train student volunteers in broadcasting with specialty programs during the week. WUMR programming and air play was tied directly to publication and ratings companies such as JazzWeek and Roots Music Report.

The University of Memphis transferred WUMR's license to Crosstown Radio Partnership, Inc. effective March 31, 2020, and the station's call sign was changed to WYXR.

== Operations ==
The staff of WYXR includes executive director Robby Grant (of the group Big Ass Truck), program manager Jared “Jay B” Boyd, development manager Kate Teague and coordinator of operations Shelby McCall.

== Notable Disc Jockeys ==
- Robert Gordon
- Andrew VanWyngarden
- Pat Sansone
- Greg Cartwright
- Zac Ives (Goner Records)
- DJ Spanish Fly
- DJ Kvng
- DJ Chris Cross
- DJ 2 Keys
- Jazzy Lo
- That Boy Cortez
- DJ Ben Murray
- DJ Alpha Whiskey
- Jack Cooper (WUMR)
