= Jimmie Lunceford =

American jazz musician (1902–1947)

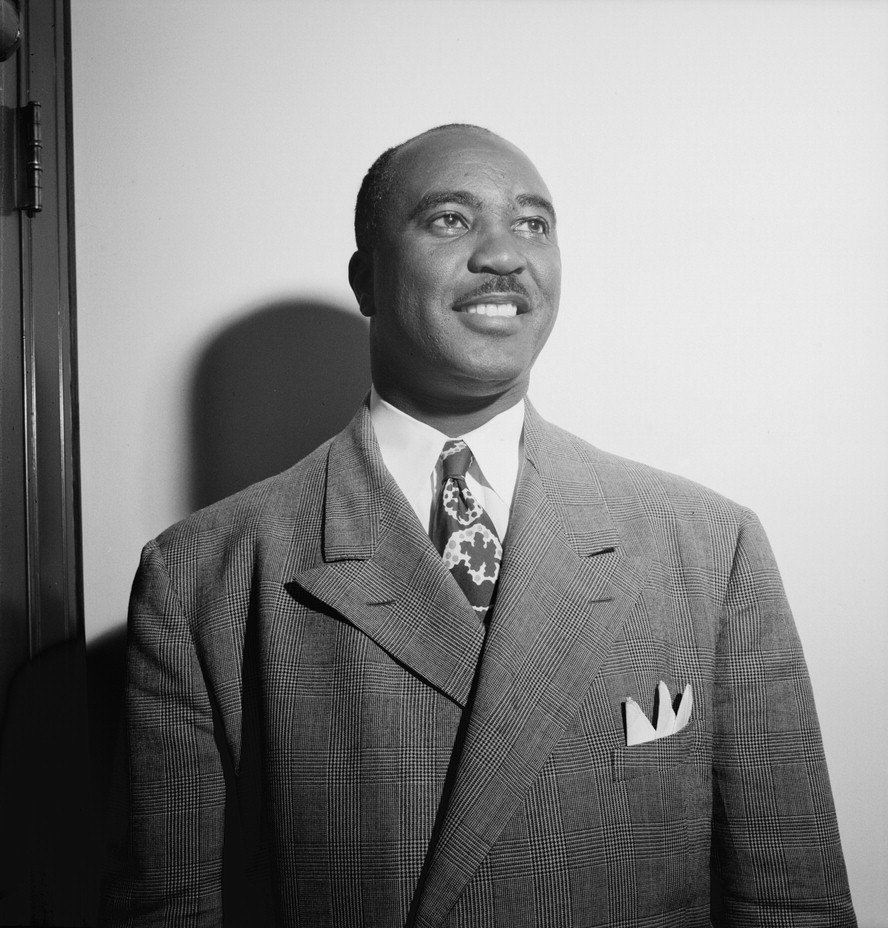

Background information
- Born: James Melvin Lunceford; June 6, 1902; Fulton, Mississippi, U.S.
- Died: July 12, 1947 (aged 45) Seaside, Oregon, U.S.
- Genres: Jazz, swing, traditional pop
- Occupations: Musician, bandleader
- Instruments: Saxophone, flute
- Labels: Decca; Columbia

James Melvin Lunceford (June 6, 1902 – July 12, 1947) was an American jazz alto saxophonist and bandleader in the swing era.

== Early life ==
Lunceford was born on a farm in the Evergreen community, west of the Tombigbee River, near Fulton, Mississippi, United States. The 53-acre (21 ha) farm was owned by his father, James. His mother was Idella ("Ida") Shumpert of Oklahoma City, an organist of "more than average ability". Seven months after James Melvin was born, the family moved to Oklahoma City.

The family next moved to Denver where Lunceford attended high school and studied music under Wilberforce J. Whiteman, father of Paul Whiteman, whose band was soon to acquire a national reputation. As a child in Denver, he learned several instruments. After high school, Lunceford continued his studies at Fisk University. In 1922, he played alto saxophone in a local band led by the violinist George Morrison which included Andy Kirk, another musician destined for fame as a bandleader.

== Career ==
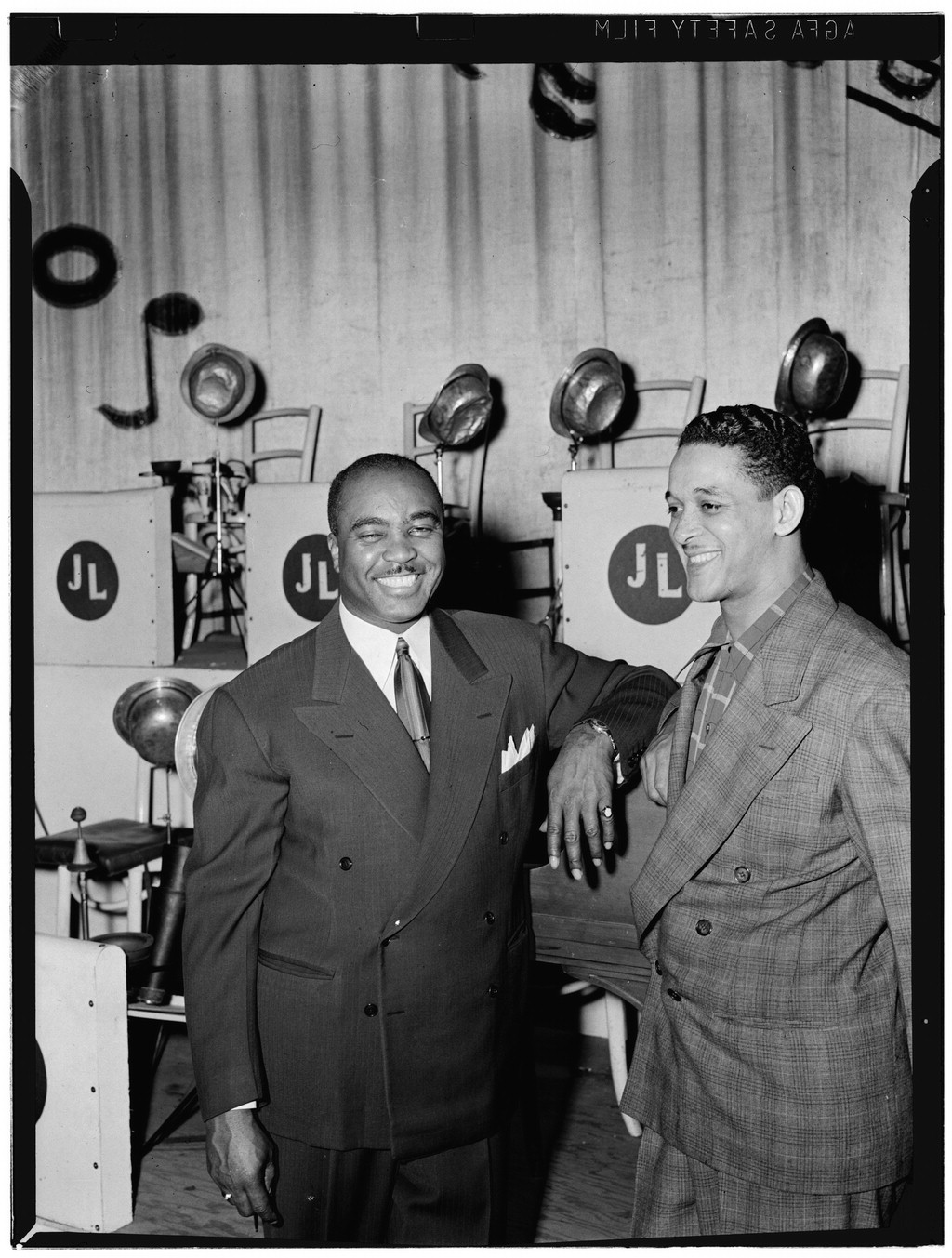
Lunceford (left) with trombonist Trummy Young

In 1927, while an athletic instructor at Manassas High School in Memphis, Tennessee, Lunceford organized a student band, the Chickasaw Syncopators, whose name was changed to the Jimmie Lunceford Orchestra. Under the new name, the band started its professional career in 1929, and made its first recordings in 1930. Lunceford was the first public high school band director in Memphis.

After a period of touring, in 1934 the band accepted a booking at the Harlem nightclub The Cotton Club for their revue "Cotton Club Parade" starring Adelaide Hall. The Cotton Club had already featured Duke Ellington and Cab Calloway, who won their first widespread fame from their inventive shows for the Cotton Club's all-white patrons. With their tight musicianship and the often outrageous humor in their music and lyrics, Lunceford's orchestra made an ideal band for the club, and Lunceford's reputation began to steadily grow.

Jimmie Lunceford's band differed from other great bands of the time because it was better known for its ensemble than for its solo work. Additionally, he was known for using a two-beat rhythm, called the Lunceford two-beat, as opposed to the standard four-beat rhythm. This distinctive "Lunceford style" was largely the result of the imaginative arrangements by trumpeter Sy Oliver, which set high standards for dance-band arrangers of the time. Though not well known as a musician, Lunceford knew how to play several instruments and was even featured on flute in "Liza".

Comedy and vaudeville played a distinct part in Lunceford's presentation. Songs such as "Rhythm Is Our Business" (featured in a 1937 musical short with Myra Johnson (Taylor) on vocals), "I'm Nuts about Screwy Music", "I Want the Waiter (With the Water)", and "Four or Five Times" displayed a playful sense of swinging, often through clever arrangements by trumpeter Sy Oliver and bizarre lyrics. Lunceford's stage shows often included costumes, skits, and obvious jabs at mainstream white bands, such as Paul Whiteman's and Guy Lombardo's.

Despite the band's comic veneer, Lunceford always maintained professionalism in the music befitting a former teacher; this professionalism paid off and during the apex of swing in the 1930s, the Orchestra was considered the equal of Ellington's, Earl Hines' or Count Basie's. This precision can be heard in such pieces as "Wham (Re-Bop-Boom-Bam)", "Lunceford Special", "For Dancers Only", "Uptown Blues", and "Stratosphere". The band's noted saxophone section was led by alto sax player Willie Smith. Lunceford often used a conducting baton to lead his band.

The orchestra began recording for the Decca label and later signed with the Columbia subsidiary Vocalion in 1938. They toured Europe extensively in 1937, but had to cancel a second tour in 1939 because of the outbreak of World War II. Columbia dropped Lunceford in 1940 because of flagging sales. (Oliver departed the group before the scheduled European tour to take a position as an arranger for Tommy Dorsey). Lunceford returned to the Decca label. The orchestra appeared in the 1941 movie Blues in the Night.

Lunceford's band was hired to play at the Elks Ballroom in Los Angeles on September 26, 1940 and again on June 26, 1947, by Leon Hefflin Sr. Most of Lunceford's sidemen were underpaid and left for better paying bands, leading to the band's decline.

== Death ==
After playing McElroy's Ballroom in Portland, Lunceford and his orchestra were in Seaside, Oregon, to play at The Bungalow dance hall on July 12, 1947. Before the performance Lunceford collapsed during an autograph session at a local record store. He died while being taken by ambulance to the Seaside hospital. Lunceford was 45. Dr. Alton Alderman performed an autopsy in nearby Astoria, Oregon, and concluded that Lunceford died of coronary occlusion.

Lunceford had complained about an aching leg as they arrived in Seaside, and had been suffering with high blood pressure for a while, and had recently complained about not feeling well. Allegations and rumors circulated that he had been poisoned by a white restaurant owner, who was unhappy at having to serve a "Negro" in his establishment. He was buried at Elmwood Cemetery in Memphis.

== Legacy ==
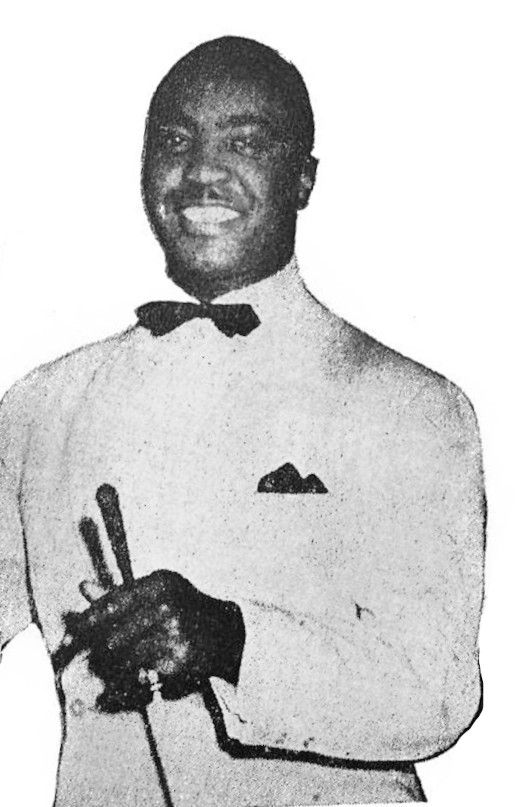
Lunceford, c. 1943

Band members, such as Eddie Wilcox and Joe Thomas, kept the band going for a time but finally had to break up the Jimmie Lunceford Orchestra in 1949.

In 1999, band-leader Robert Veen and a team of musicians set out to acquire permission to use the original band charts and arrangements of the Jimmie Lunceford canon. "The Jimmie Lunceford Legacy Orchestra" officially debuted in July 2005 at the North Sea Jazz Festival in the Netherlands.

The Jimmie Lunceford Jamboree Festival was founded by Bro. Ronald Cortez Herd II (aka 'R2C2H2 Tha Artivist') in 2007 with the aim of increasing recognition of Lunceford's contribution to jazz, particularly in Memphis, Tennessee. The Jimmie Lunceford Legacy Awards were created by the festival to honor exceptional musicians with Memphis ties as well as those who have dedicated their careers to excellence in music and music education.

Lunceford's music continues to have an impact. Most recently the tune "Rhythm Is Our Business" was included as a track on the compilation set Memphis Jazz Box in 2004 in honor of Lunceford's close ties to Memphis.

== Discography ==
=== Decca recordings ===
- For Dancers Only (A Collection of His Most Famous Records) (78 rpm 4-disc album set/8 songs/Decca #A-664: 1949; original 10-inch LP issue/8 songs/Decca #DL-5393: 1952)
- Jazz Heritage Series #3- Jimmie Lunceford 1: Rhythm Is Our Business (1934-1935) (LP: Decca #79237, 1968; LP reissue: MCA #1302, 1980)
- Jazz Heritage Series #6- Jimmie Lunceford 2: Harlem Shout (1935-1936) (LP: Decca #79238, 1968; LP reissue: MCA #1305, 1980)
- Jazz Heritage Series #8- Jimmie Lunceford 3: For Dancers Only (1936-1937) (LP: Decca #79239, 1968; LP reissue: MCA #1307, 1980)
- Jazz Heritage Series #15- Jimmie Lunceford 4: Blues In The Night (1938-1942) (LP: Decca #79240, 1968; LP reissue: MCA #1314, 1980)
- Jazz Heritage Series #21- Jimmie Lunceford 5: Jimmie's Legacy (1934-1937) (LP: MCA #1320, 1980)
- Jazz Heritage Series #22- Jimmie Lunceford 6: The Last Sparks (1941-1944) (LP: MCA #1321, 1980)
- Stomp It Off (1934-1935) (CD: GRP #608, 1992)
- For Dancers Only (1935-1937) (CD: GRP #645, 1994)
- Swingsation: Jimmie Lunceford (1935-1938) (CD: GRP #9923, 1998)
- The Complete Jimmie Lunceford Decca Sessions (1934-1938, 1941-1945) (Mosaic #MD7-250, 2014) 7-CD box set

=== Columbia recordings ===
- Lunceford Special (1939-1940) (78 rpm 4-disc album set/8 songs/Columbia #C-175: 1948; original 10-inch LP issue/8 songs/Columbia #GL-104: 1952; first LP issue/12 songs/Columbia #CL-634: 1956; expanded LP reissue/16 songs/Columbia #CL-2715 and #CS-9515: 1967; CD release/22 songs/Sony Legacy #CK-65647: 2001)
- "Chickasaw Stomp'"/"Memphis Rag" (Columbia W-145.373/4) - recorded Memphis, December 13, 1927
- "Flaming Reeds and Screaming Brass"/"While Love Lasts" (test pressings for Columbia, not released until 1967 on LP) - recorded New York, May 15, 1933

=== Victor recordings ===
- "In Dat Mornin'"/"Sweet Rhythm" (Victor V-38141) - recorded Memphis, June 6, 1930
- "Jazznocracy"/"Chillun, Get Up" (Victor 24522) - recorded New York, January 26, 1934
- "White Heat"/"Leaving Me" (Victor 24586) - recorded New York, January 26, 1934
- "Breakfast Ball"/"Here Goes (A Fool)" (Victor 24601) - recorded New York, March 20, 1934
- "Swingin' Uptown"/"Remember When" (Victor 24669) - recorded New York, March 20, 1934,

=== Majestic recordings ===
- Margie (1946-1947) (LP and CD release/13 songs/Savoy Jazz #SJL-1209: 1989)

=== The Chronological Classics series ===
Apart from live recordings and alternate takes, every recording by Jimmie Lunceford & His Orchestra is included in this ten-volume series from the Classics reissue label:

- The Chronological Jimmie Lunceford & His Orchestra 1930-1934 (#501, EAN 3307517050120)
- The Chronological Jimmie Lunceford & His Orchestra 1934-1935 (#505, EAN 3307517050526)
- The Chronological Jimmie Lunceford & His Orchestra 1935-1937 (#510, EAN 3307517051028)
- The Chronological Jimmie Lunceford & His Orchestra 1937-1939 (#520 EAN 3307517052025)
- The Chronological Jimmie Lunceford & His Orchestra 1939 (#532, EAN 3307517053220)
- The Chronological Jimmie Lunceford & His Orchestra 1939-1940 (#565, EAN 3307517056528)
- The Chronological Jimmie Lunceford & His Orchestra 1940-1941 (#622, EAN 3307517062222)
- The Chronological Jimmie Lunceford & His Orchestra 1941-1945 (#862, EAN 3307517086228)
- The Chronological Jimmie Lunceford & His Orchestra 1945-1947 (#1082, EAN 3307517108227)
- The Chronological Jimmie Lunceford's Orchestra 1948-1949 (#1151, EAN 3307517115126)

The last album (1948-1949) was recorded after Lunceford's death by his long-time band under the joint-direction of Eddie Wilcox (his piano player) and Joe Thomas (his tenor sax player/vocalist).

=== The Masters of Jazz series ===
An eight-volume series from the Masters of Jazz imprint on French Média 7 and Musisoft attempted the same chronological traverse under the direction of Bruno Théol, Christian Bonnet, Jacques Lubin and Lionel Risler, released 1991 thru 2000:

- Jimmie Lunceford vol. 1: 1927-1934 (#MJCD 12, 3356571001227)
- Jimmie Lunceford vol. 2: 1934 (#MJCD 18, 3356571001821)
- Jimmie Lunceford vol. 3: 1935-1936 (#MJCD 57, 3356571005720)
- Jimmie Lunceford vol. 4: 1936-1937 (#MJCD 71, 3356571007120)
- Jimmie Lunceford vol. 5: 1937-1939 (#MJCD 84, 3356571009424)
- Jimmie Lunceford vol. 6: Jan. to Aug. 1939 (#MJCD 98, 33565710009827)
- Jimmie Lunceford vol. 7: Sep. 1939 to Feb. 1940 (#MJCD 147, 3356571014722)
- Jimmie Lunceford vol. 8: May 1940 to Apr. 1940 (#MJCD 160, 3356571016023)

=== CD reissue compilations ===
- Rhythm Is Our Business: The Great Jimmie Lunceford Orchestra (rec. 1933-1940, ASV/Living Era, 1992) successively covering both the Decca and Columbia periods.
- It's the Way That You Swing It: The Hits of Jimmie Lunceford (Jasmine, 2002) 2-CD set
- Jukebox Hits 1935-1947 (Acrobat, 2005)
- Quadromania: Jimmie Lunceford – Life Is Fine (rec. 1935-1945, Membran/Quadromania Jazz, 2006) 4-CD box set
- Strictly Lunceford (Proper, 2007) 4-CD box set
- The Jimmie Lunceford Collection 1930-47 (Fabulous/Acrobat, 2014) 2-CD set
