= Jazz Orchestra of the Delta =

American concert jazz orchestra

- Origin: Memphis, Tennessee
- Genres: Jazz; big band
- Years active: 1999–present
- Labels: Summit Records
- Members: Jack Cooper, Leader; John Lux, Lead Alto Saxophone; Mike Krepper, Alto Saxophone; Larry Panella, Tenor Saxophone; Tom Link, Tenor Saxophone; Michael Scott, Baritone Saxophone; David Spencer, Lead Trumpet; Kyle Millsap, Trumpet; Paul McKinney, Trumpet; Tom Clary, Trumpet; Greg Luscomb, Trombone; Howard Lamb, Trombone; John Mueller, Trombone; Eddie Clark, Bass Trombone; Charlton Johnson, Guitar; Alvie Givhan, Piano; Sam Shoup, Bass; Michael Waldrop, Drums
- Past members: Ken Spain; Bill Flores; Jeff Huddleston; Andre Matlin; John Kennedy; Larry Jones; Tim Goodwin; Reid McCoy; Kerry Movausogh; James Sexton; Bo Harris

The Jazz Orchestra of the Delta is a 17 piece concert jazz orchestra based primarily out of Memphis, Tennessee. The group was founded in 1998 and had their first commercial CD release in 2003, "Big Band Reflections of Cole Porter" on Summit Records featuring vocalist Sandra Dudley and jazz trumpeter Marvin Stamm which received numerous reviews and four out of five stars in Allmusic Guide. Their recording is also included as the third CD in the three disc box set, the Memphis Jazz Box.

The group features studio musicians in the Mid-South region (Memphis and Nashville) of the United States and has performed numerous concerts to include artistic collaborations with the Memphis Symphony Orchestra, Ballet Memphis, and Mahogany jazz artist Kathy Kosins. The group primarily features the music of composer/arranger Jack Cooper, who is the musical director and co-founder of the JOD. More recent performances were on Sunday, June 5, 2011 at the Levitt Shell Amphitheatre Concert series in Memphis, Tennessee and Saturday March 7, 2015 at the Michael D. Rose Theatre to premiere the Origin Records release of the CD Time Within Itself.

== Discography ==
- 2000 Live at Harris Concert Hall (JOD 001)
- 2003 Big Band Reflections of Cole Porter (Summit Records)
- 2004 Memphis Jazz Box (Select-O-Hits Records)
- 2004 Summit Jazz Sampler (Summit Records)
- 2011 Live at the Levitt Shell Concert Series (JOD 002)

== See also ==
- Big Band Reflections of Cole Porter
- Memphis Jazz Box
- Jack Cooper
