= Select-O-Hits =

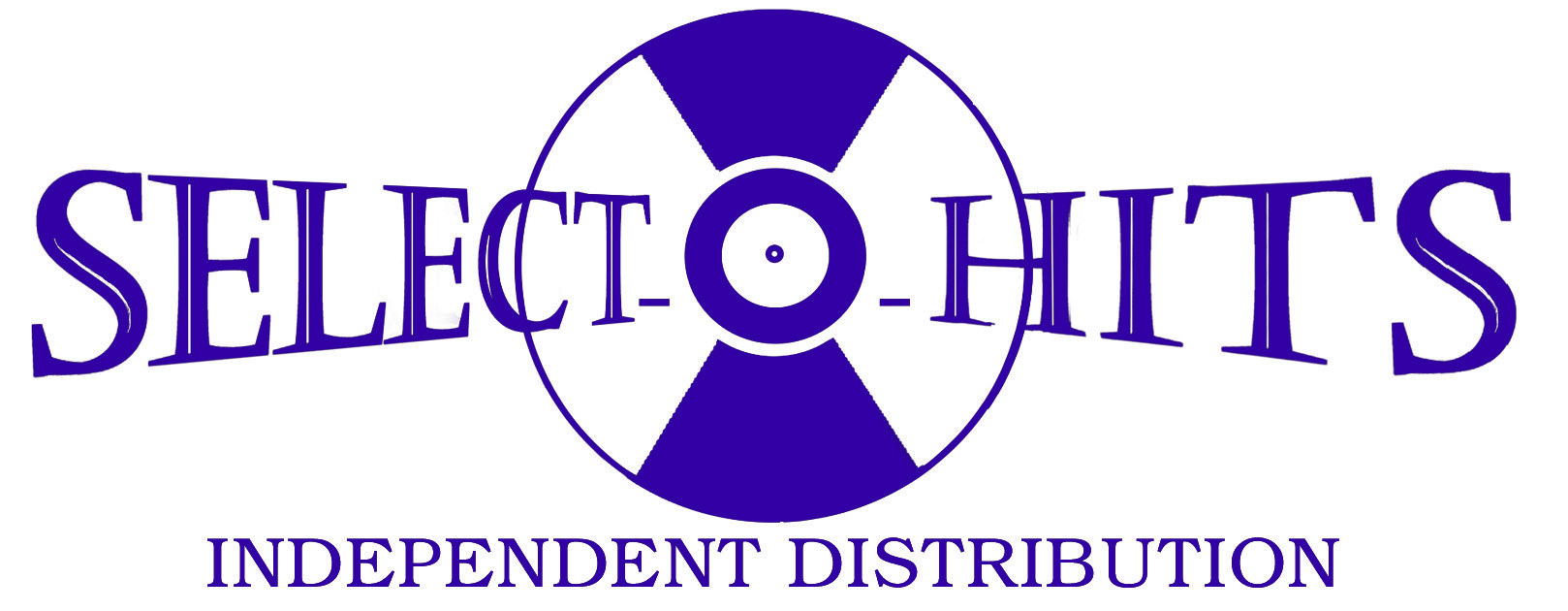
- Parent company: Select-O-Hits, Inc.
- Founded: September, 1960
- Founder: Tom Phillips, Sam Phillips
- Distributor: The Orchard
- Genre: Gospel, Rap, R&B, Blues, Country, Latin
- Country of origin: U.S.
- Location: 1981 Fletcher Creek Drive, Memphis, Tennessee, 38133, U.S.
- Official website: http://www.selectohits.com

Select-O-Hits is an American independent record label music distributor headquartered in Memphis, Tennessee, United States. They have been in business for almost 60 years, and distribute artists that include Johnnie Taylor, Jimmy Buffett, Hypnotize Minds, Colt Ford, Diana Reyes, and The Texas Tenors.

== Company history ==
=== The early years ===
Select-O-Hits, which is owned by Sam W. Phillips and John Phillips, was co-founded in 1960 by their father, Tom Phillips, and uncle, Sam Phillips, the founder of Sun Records.

Tom Phillips began his career in music as Jerry Lee Lewis' road manager for a number of years. He had invested all of his savings into an upcoming 1958 European tour when news of Lewis' marriage to his 13-year-old cousin hit the front pages. Lewis' career came to a sudden, although temporary, halt. The tour was cancelled, and Tom was broke. Sam helped by giving him a job in the Sun Records warehouse and allowing Tom to live with him while his family stayed behind in Mobile, Alabama. Eventually, Tom saved enough money to send for his family in 1960.

Tom was not satisfied with running the warehouse, so with the help of his wife, Lucille, he opened a small record store and one-stop that provided small, predominantly black-owned record stores with everything from phonograph needles to display racks.

=== 1970s to 1990s ===
In the mid-1970s, Select-O-Hits began to concentrate more on distributing and less on retail and one-stops. The retail store closed in the mid-1980s, and the one-stop followed a few years later.

Select-O-Hits has formed a number of successful record labels, such as Avenue, Icehouse, SOH, Brutal Records, Basix Music, Blues Works and Prophet. In 1997 half of the company was sold to Malaco of Jackson, Mississippi.

=== Recent ===
In 2005, Select-O-Hits and Malaco acquired Atlanta International Records of Atlanta, Georgia. While all genres of music are represented in the family of labels Select-O-Hits distributes, Rap, Blues, Soul and Gospel are still the largest portion of the business.

Today with sales staff in Memphis, New York, Sacramento, Miami, and Dallas, Select-O-Hits is one of the largest independent record distributors in the country, providing services for over 300 independent vendors to all key US music traditional "brick and mortar" retailers, as well as digital media sites such as iTunes and eMusic.

=== Select-O Latino ===
In 2007, Select-O-Hits began distributing Latin and regional Mexican music labels.

Since then, the Select-O Latino brand has grown to include multiple Latin Grammy-nominated artists such as Luis Enrique, Luz Rios, Diego Verdaguer, Los Invasores de Nuevo León, and Orestes Vilató.

== Sampling of artists and labels distributed ==
=== Artists ===
- The Texas Tenors
- Colt Ford
- Dondria
- Pastor Troy
- BeBe & CeCe Winans
- Lee DeWyze
- Jimmy Buffett
- Bret Michaels
- Three 6 Mafia
- Brantley Gilbert
- Miguelito
- Chris Isaak
- Don Cheto
- Joan Jett
- Lega-C
- 8Ball & MJG
- Jencarlos Canela
- Diana Reyes
- Diego Verdaguer
- Ann-Margret
- Light Crust Doughboys
- James Blackwood
- The Jordanaires
- Bobby Jones
- Nokie Edwards
- Lil Wyte
- Jawga Boyz
- King Lil G
- Ryan Upchurch
- The Smash Brothers

=== Labels ===
- Malaco Records
- Sun Records
- Stax Records
- Mailboat Records
- Blackheart Records
- Prophet Entertainment
- Art Greenhaw Records
- Foghat Records
