= Just a Girl That Men Forget =

American song

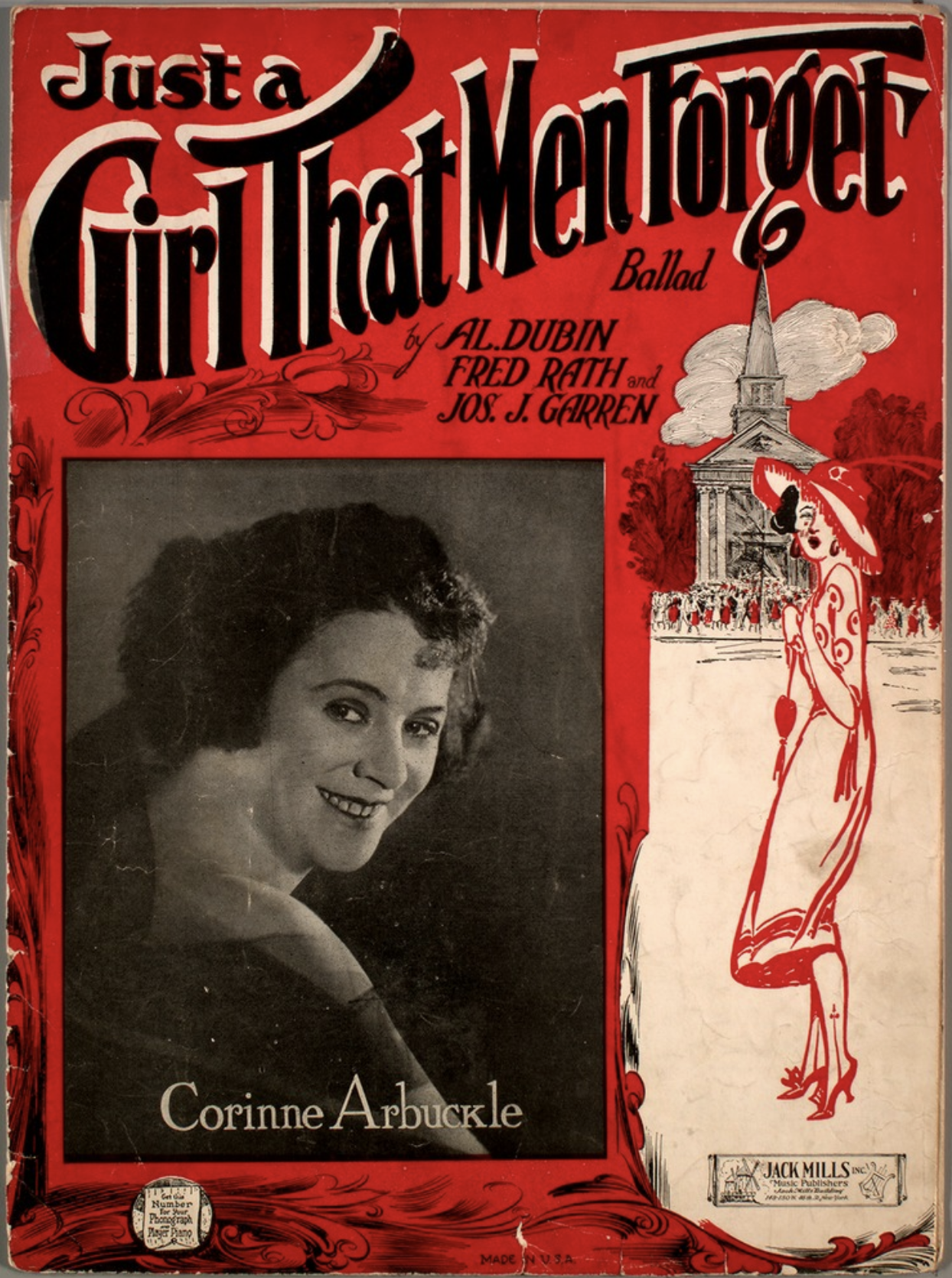

Single
- Published: 1923
- Genre: Ballad, Waltz
- Songwriter(s): Al Dubin, Fred Rath and Joe Garren

Just a Girl That Men Forget is an American waltz ballad song, written by Al Dubin, Fred Rath and Joe Garren with sheet music published in 1923 by Jack Mills, Inc. It was an in-demand Tin Pan Alley hit song in 1923 and 1924, popularized by singers Herbert Payne and Lewis James. It was also a well purchased piece of sheet music, and during the Tin Pan Alley era, the sheet music sales determined if a song was a "hit" rather than charts.

== History ==
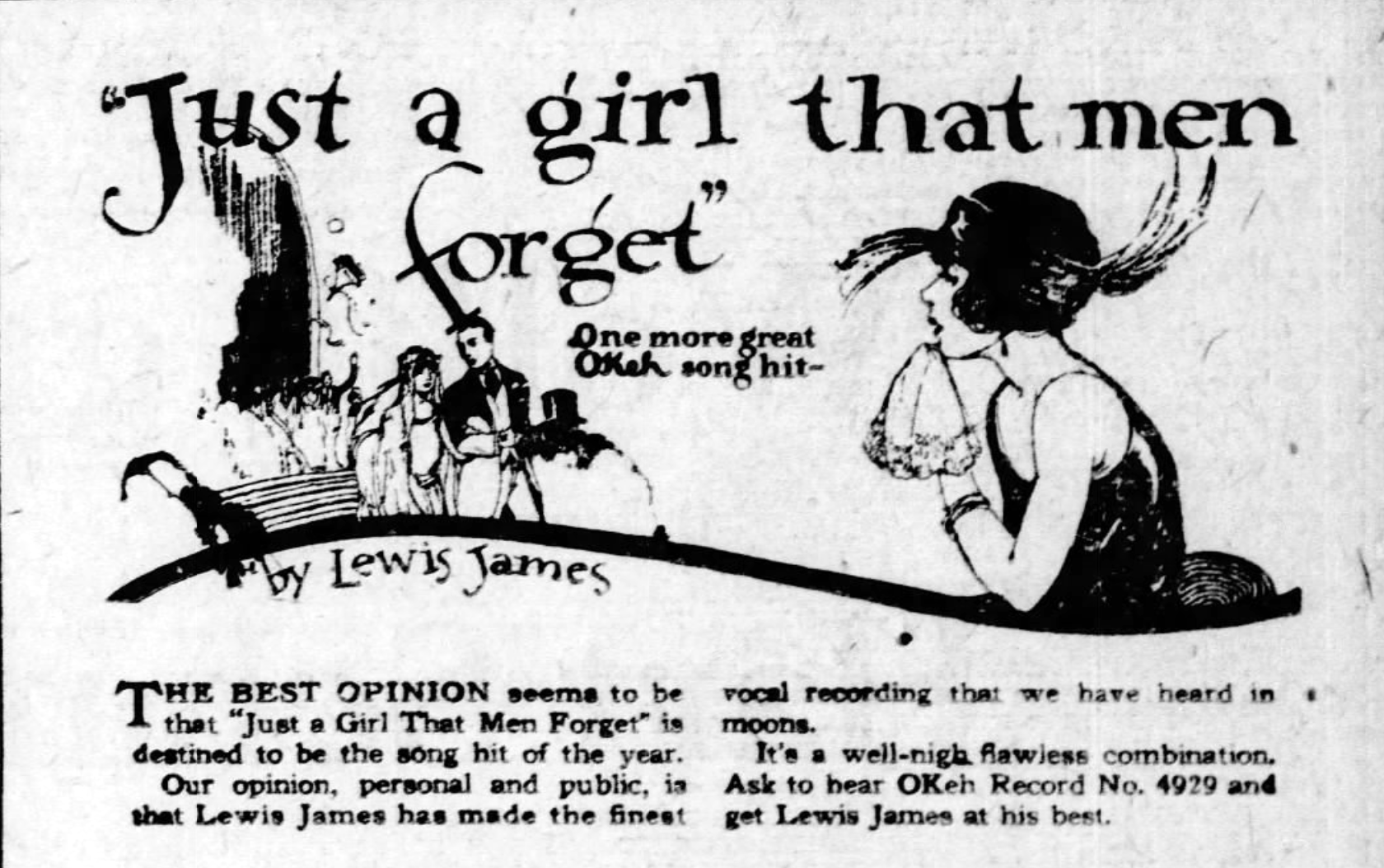
1923 Lewis James advertisement by Okeh Records

The lyrics are about a modern and promiscuous flapper girl who would be passed over for marriage, because men like "old fashion" girls. The song begins with the lyrics "Dear little girl, they call you a vamp, a flapper with up to date ways." Flappers did not appreciate the song's lyrics, and hundreds of letters of "resentment" were written to Jack Mills, Inc.

It has been recorded by several musicians including Herbert Payne (1923), Lewis James (1923), the Courtney Sisters (1923), Henry Burr (1923), The Troubadours (1923), Vernon Dalhart (1923), Jimmie Davis (1937), Ozie Waters (1951), Carmen Prentice (1923), Irving Kaufman (1923), Jim Doherty, Ben Selvin and His Orchestra (Vocalion Records), Charles Hart, and the DeMarco Sisters.

The Library of Congress archive has a 1923 recording of the song performed by Henry Burr with Celeste and orchestra. In 1986, a Dear Abby advice column was published, with memories of this song as a subject. Sheet music for the song are extant.

== See also ==
- List of best-selling sheet music
- The Tin Pan Alley Rag, 2009 musical written by Mark Saltzman
