= Cab Calloway's Jitterbug Party =

- Directed by: Fred Waller
- Written by: Milton Hockey; Fred Rath
- Produced by: Adolph Zukor
- Starring: Cab Calloway
- Music by: Cab Calloway and his Orchestra
- Distributed by: Paramount Pictures
- Release date: 1935
- Running time: 8 minutes
- Country: United States
- Language: English

Cab Calloway's Jitterbug Party is a 1935 American musical short film which was released by Paramount Pictures (later sold to U.M. & M. TV Corporation). In 2001, the film was reissued by Kino International in the DVD collection Hollywood Rhythm: Vol. 1-The Best Of Jazz And Blues.

== Synopsis ==
Bandleader Cab Calloway and his Orchestra perform "Hotcha Razz-Ma-Tazz" and "Long About Midnight" at the Cotton Club in Harlem, New York before going to a house party and performing "Jitterbug". In the final sequence, a young Lena Horne can be seen as a Cotton Club dancer doing the jitterbug.
