= List of Los Angeles Valley College alumni =

Los Angeles Valley College is a public community college located in Los Angeles, California. Following are some of its notable members.

== Entertainment ==
- Sean Astin – actor, best known for playing Sam in The Lord of the Rings films.
- Ed Begley Jr. – actor and environmentalist
- Julie Brown, actress, comedienne, singer, producer, screenwriter
- Adam Carolla – comedian, podcaster, and author
- John David Carson – actor, star of Pretty Maids All in a Row
- Bryan Cranston – actor known for Malcolm in the Middle and Breaking Bad
- Andraé Crouch - gospel singer, songwriter, and choir leader
- Mark Dacascos – martial artist, actor, and the chairman in Iron Chef America
- Micky Dolenz – actor and lead singer and drummer of The Monkees
- Briana Evigan – actress and dancer
- Jerry Mathers – actor, best known for playing Beaver Cleaver in Leave It to Beaver
- Troy Miller – film producer, director and screenwriter
- Christopher Norris – movie and television actress
- Michael Richards – actor who played Kramer on Seinfeld
- Richard Rossi – musician and filmmaker
- Tom Selleck – actor known for Magnum, P.I.
- Phil Snyder – voice actor, best known as the voice of Jiminy Cricket
- Kevin Spacey – winner of the Academy Award for Best Supporting Actor in The Usual Suspects and Academy Award for Best Actor for American Beauty
- Jeff Wayne – musician, best known as the composer of The War of the Worlds
- April Winchell – actress and radio personality
- Jim Yester – musician, lead vocalist, guitarist, and keyboardist for The Association

== Literature and journalism ==
- Gene Baur – author and activist in the animal rights and food movement
- Stefano Bloch – author and academic
- David Gerrold – writer

== Politics ==
- Steve Hofbauer, mayor of Palmdale, California

== Sports ==
- Jim Arellanes – professional football player
- Doug Baker – professional baseball player
- Larry Banner – Olympic gymnast
- Jim Benedict – professional baseball pitcher, coach, scout, and front office executive
- Otis Burrell – champion track and field athlete
- Alex Cabagnot – professional basketball player
- Bobby Castillo – former Major League Baseball pitcher and 1981 World Series Champion with the Los Angeles Dodgers
- José Cortez – professional football player
- Leon Criner – played major league baseball for the New York Mets
- Pat Doyle – baseball coach
- Sue Gossick – 1968 Olympic Gold Medalist for springboard diving
- Vic Harris – professional baseball player and manager
- Bryan Henderson – professional Arena Football League player
- Francisco Herrera – Los Angeles Dodgers ball boy
- Jack Hirsch – college basketball player and coach
- Charlie Kendall – professional football player
- Rory Markas, sportscaster
- Don McKenzie – 1968 Olympic gold medal in 100m breaststroke and 400m medley
- Dennis Moeller – professional baseball player
- Linda Murphy – volleyball player and Olympian
- Rock Richmond – professional football player
- Don Shinnick – professional football player and coach
- Dave Snow – college and Olympic baseball coach
- Jack Steptoe – professional football player and college coach
- László Tábori – Olympic runner
- Eric Yarber – professional football player and coach
