= Al Dubin =

Swiss-American lyricist (1891–1945)

- Born: Alexander Dubin; June 10, 1891; Zürich, Switzerland
- Died: February 11, 1945 (aged 53); New York City, New York, U.S.
- Occupation: Lyricist
- Years active: 1909–45
- Spouse(s): Helen McClay (1921–1943); Edwina Coolidge (1943-1943)
- Children: Simon Joseph (died 4 days after birth), Patricia Dubin McGuire
- Parent(s): Simon and Minna Dubin
- Relatives: Joseph Dubin (brother)

Alexander Dubin (June 10, 1891 – February 11, 1945) was an American lyricist. He is best known for his collaborations with the composer Harry Warren.

== Life ==
Al Dubin came from a Russian Jewish family that immigrated to the United States from Switzerland when he was two years old. Born in Zürich, Switzerland, he grew up in Philadelphia. Between ages of thirteen and sixteen, Dubin played hookey from school in order to travel into New York City to see Broadway musical shows. At age 14 he began writing special material for a vaudeville entertainer on 28th Street between 5th and Broadway in New York City, otherwise known as Tin Pan Alley.

Dubin was accepted and enrolled at Perkiomen Seminary in September 1909, but was expelled in 1911, after writing their Alma Mater. After leaving Perkiomen, Dubin got himself a job as a singing waiter at a Philadelphia restaurant. He continued to write lyrics and tried selling them to area publishing firms. During this time, Dubin met composer Joe Burke. Together they wrote the song "Oh, You, Mister Moon" (1911), which was published by M. Witmark & Sons. The team also composed the Villanova University Anthem (Alma Mater).

In 1917, Dubin was drafted at Camp Upton in Yaphank, New York, and served as a private in the 305th Field Artillery of the 77th Division, known as New York's own. During his service, he wrote the song "They Didn’t Think We'd Do it, But We Did" with composer Fred Rath and published by the 77th Division. On his first weekend pass, Dubin went to see a show at the Majestic Theater in New York City. There he met Broadway singer Helen McClay. They were married on March 19, 1921, at the Church of St. Elizabeth in New York City, after Dubin converted to the Catholic faith and McClay was granted an annulment of her first marriage. The year they married, Dubin was accepted in ASCAP in 1921.

Known for his larger-than-life persona, Dubin struggled with alcohol and drugs, and fell on hard times in the 1940s. Estranged from his wife, Dubin struggled to find work both in Hollywood and New York. The last show Dubin was contracted to work on was Laffing Room Only, with composer Burton Lane. Dubin provided only a title for this production, "Feudin' and a Fightin'", for which he received 25 percent credit.

Dubin spent the remainder of the last few years of his life at the Empire Hotel, alone and in ill-health. On February 8, 1945, he collapsed on the street after having taken a large quantity of doctor-prescribed barbiturates. He was admitted to the Roosevelt Hospital for barbiturate poisoning and pneumonia, and later died on February 11, 1945. Newspaper personality Walter Winchell made the announcement of his death on the radio.

Dubin was interred in the Holy Cross Cemetery in Culver City, California.

== Career ==
Dubin sold his first set of lyrics for two songs "Prairie Rose" and "Sunray", in 1909 to the Witmark Music Publishing Firm.

In 1925, Dubin met the composer Harry Warren, who was to become his future collaborator at Warner Bros. studio in Hollywood. The first song they collaborated on was titled, "Too Many Kisses in the Summer Bring Too Many Tears in the Fall". But it was another song written with Joseph Meyer that same year that became Dubin's first big hit, "A Cup of Coffee, a Sandwich and You".

Warner Bros. purchased the publishing firms of Witmark, Remick and Harms, and since Dubin was under contract to Harms, Warner Bros. inherited his services. In 1929, Dubin wrote "Tiptoe through the Tulips" with composer Joe Burke, for the film Gold Diggers of Broadway.

In 1932, Dubin teamed officially with composer Harry Warren on the movie musical 42nd Street, starring Ruby Keeler, Dick Powell, Warner Baxter and Bebe Daniels, with dance routines sequenced by Busby Berkeley. The songwriting team of Warren and Dubin contributed four songs: "42nd Street", "You're Getting to Be a Habit with Me", "Young and Healthy" and "Shuffle Off to Buffalo".

Between 1932 and 1939, Dubin and Warren wrote 60 hit songs for several Warner Bros. movie musicals, including Gold Diggers of 1933, Footlight Parade starring James Cagney, Roman Scandals starring Eddie Cantor, Dames, Go Into Your Dance and Wonder Bar, both starring Al Jolson. The song "Lullaby of Broadway", written by Warren and Dubin for the musical film, Gold Diggers of 1935, won the 1936 Academy Award for Best Original Song.

== Legacy ==
In 1980, producer David Merrick and director Gower Champion adapted the 1933 film 42nd Street into a Broadway musical that won The Tony Award for Best Musical in 1981. The book for the show was written by Michael Stewart and Mark Bramble and featured a score that incorporated Warren and Dubin songs from various movie musicals including 42nd Street, Dames, Go Into Your Dance, Gold Diggers of 1933 and Gold Diggers of 1935.

Dubin was inducted into the Songwriters Hall of Fame in 1970.

== Work on Broadway ==
- Charlot Revue (1925) – revue – featured co-lyricist for "A Cup of Coffee, a Sandwich and You"
- White Lights (1927) – musical – co-lyricist
- Streets of Paris (1939) – revue – lyricist
- Keep Off the Grass (1940) – revue – co-lyricist
- Star and Garter (1942) – revue – featured lyricist for "Robert the Roue"
- Sugar Babies (1979) – revue – co-lyricist
- 42nd Street (1980, revival in 2001) – musical – lyricist

== Notable films ==
- The Show of Shows (1929)
- Gold Diggers of Broadway (1929)
- Sally (1929)
- Oh Sailor Beware (1929)
- Hold Everything (1930)
- She Couldn't Say No (1930)
- 42nd Street (1933)
- Footlight Parade (1933)
- Roman Scandals (1933)
- Gold Diggers of 1933 (1933)
- Moulin Rouge (1934)
- Wonder Bar (1934)
- Dames (1934)
- Twenty Million Sweethearts (1934)
- Go Into Your Dance (1935)
- Gold Diggers of 1935 (1935)
- Broadway Gondolier (1935)
- Stars Over Broadway (1935)
- Shipmates Forever (1935)
- Gold Diggers of 1937 (1937)
- Mr. Dodd Takes the Air (1937)
- Gold Diggers in Paris (1938)
- Garden of the Moon (1938)
- Streets of Paris (1939)
- Stage Door Canteen (1943)

== Notable songs ==
- "Just a Girl That Men Forget" – lyrics by Al Dubin, Fred Rath and Joe Garren (1923)
- "A Cup of Coffee, a Sandwich, and You" – lyrics by Al Dubin and Billy Rose, music by Joseph Meyer (1925)
- "Tiptoe Through The Tulips" – Joe Burke (1929)
- "Dancing with Tears in My Eyes" from Dancing Sweeties (1930) (registered as T-070.038.290-6)
- "Forty-Second Street" – 42nd Street – Harry Warren – M. Witmark & Sons. (1932)
- "Shuffle Off to Buffalo" – 42nd Street
- "Young and Healthy" – 42nd Street
- "You're Getting to Be a Habit with Me" – 42nd Street
- "Shanghai Lil" – music by Harry Warren from Footlight Parade. (1933)
- "Keep Young and Beautiful" – Harry Warren from Roman Scandals. (1933)
- "Shadow Waltz" – Gold Diggers of 1933 – Harry Warren – M. Witmark & Sons (1933)
- "We're In the Money" – Gold Diggers of 1933
- "Pettin' in the Park" – Gold Diggers of 1933
- "Remember My Forgotten Man" – Gold Diggers of 1933
- "I've Got to Sing a Love Song" – Gold Diggers of 1933
- "The Boulevard of Broken Dreams" – Harry Warren from Moulin Rouge (1934)
- "Wonder Bar" – Harry Warren from Wonder Bar (1934)
- "I Only Have Eyes for You" – Dames – Harry Warren – Remick Music Corp. (1934)
- "Dames" – Dames
- "Go Into Your Dance" – Go Into Your Dance – Harry Warren – M. Witmark & Sons (1935)
- About a Quarter to Nine" – Go Into Your Dance
- "She's a Latin from Manhattan" – Go Into Your Dance
- "Lullaby of Broadway" – Gold Diggers of 1935 – Harry Warren – M. Witmark & Sons (1935)
- "I'm Going Shopping with You" – Gold Diggers of 1935
- "Lulu's Back In Town" – Harry Warren from Broadway Gondolier (1935)
- "Don't Give Up the Ship" – Harry Warren from Shipmates Forever (1935)
- "With Plenty of Money and You" – Harry Warren from Gold Diggers of 1937 (1937)
- "September in the Rain" – Harry Warren from Melody for Two. (1937)
- "Remember Me?" – Harry Warren from Mr. Dodd Takes the Air (1937)
- "The Song of the Marines" – Harry Warren from The Singing Marine (1937)
- "I Wanna Go Back to Bali" – Gold Diggers of 1938 – Harry Warren – Remick Music Corp. (1938)
- "The Latin Quarter" – Gold Diggers of 1938
- "Indian Summer" (1919) – Harms, Inc. (1939)
- "We Mustn't Say Goodbye" – Stage Door Canteen – music by James V. Monaco; Academy Award nominee for Best Song
- "Feudin' and Fightin'" – title by Dubin, words and music by Burton Lane – Mara-Lane Music Corp. from "Laughing Room Only" (1944)
- Villanova University Anthem (Alma Mater) Al Dubin and Joe Burke, J.W. Pepper and Son (1930)
- "Where Was I", song by W. Frank Harling and Al Dubin performed by Ruby Newman and His Orchestra, with vocal chorus by Larry Taylor and Peggy McCall (1939)
