= Francisco Herrera =

Francisco Herrera may refer to:

- Francisco Herrera the Elder (c. 1590 – 1656), Spanish painter
- Francisco Herrera the Younger (1622–1685), his son, Spanish painter
- Francisco Herrera Jiménez (born 1965), Mexican politician
- Francisco Herrera Latoja (fl. 1970s), Chilean military officer and public official
- Francisco Herrera León (born 1966), Mexican politician
- Francisco Herrera Luque (1927–1991), Venezuelan writer
- Francisco Herrera (baseball), Los Angeles Dodgers clubhouse staff
- Francisco Herrera (comics), comic book illustrator and co-creator of Mania
