= Public Defender (1917 film) =

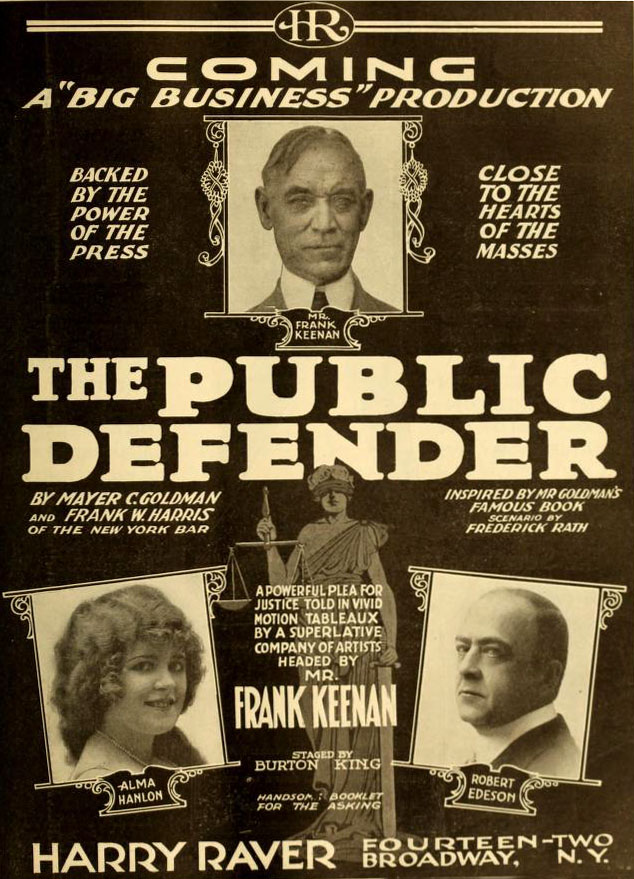
- poster
- Directed by: Burton L. King
- Written by: Frederick Rath; Mayer C. Goldman; Frank W. Harris
- Produced by: Harry R. Raver; Apollo Pictures
- Starring: Frank Keenan; Alma Hanlon
- Distributed by: State Right
- Release date: November 3, 1917
- Running time: 6 reels
- Country: USA
- Language: Silent..English titles

Public Defender is a 1917 silent film drama directed by Burton L. King with Frank Keenan.

== Cast ==
- Frank Keenan - Robert Murdock
- Alma Hanlon - Mary Reed
- Robert Edeson - Arthur Nelson
- John St. Polis - David Moulton (*John Sainpolis)
- Florence Short - Rose Moulton
- Louis Stern - Leslie Morrison (Louis Sterns)
- Tex La Grove - Walter Holmes
- Harry Kingsley - Arthur Stevens
- Helen Conwell - Queenie La Mar
- James E. Sullivan - Father O'Malley (James Sullivan)
- F. A. Cronin - James Whalon
- John O'Keefe - John Hartley
- John K. Roberts - 'Billy' Means (J. K. Roberts)

== Preservation status ==
- A copy of the film is preserved in a foreign archive.
