= When a Man Rides Alone =

When a Man Rides Alone may refer to:

- When a Man Rides Alone (1919 film), American silent western
- When a Man Rides Alone (1933 film), American western starring Tom Tyler
