= Hello Sister =

Hello Sister may refer to:

- Hello Sister (1930 film), a film by Walter Lang
- Hello, Sister! (1933 film), a film produced by Fox Film Corporation
