= Apollo Pictures =

Apollo Pictures Inc. was a film production company in the United States in 1917. (Note: Not to be confused with more recent film producer that made films in 1980s including Rolling Vengeance.)

The company was located in New York, and was referred as "picture peal" by the Norfolk Daily News.

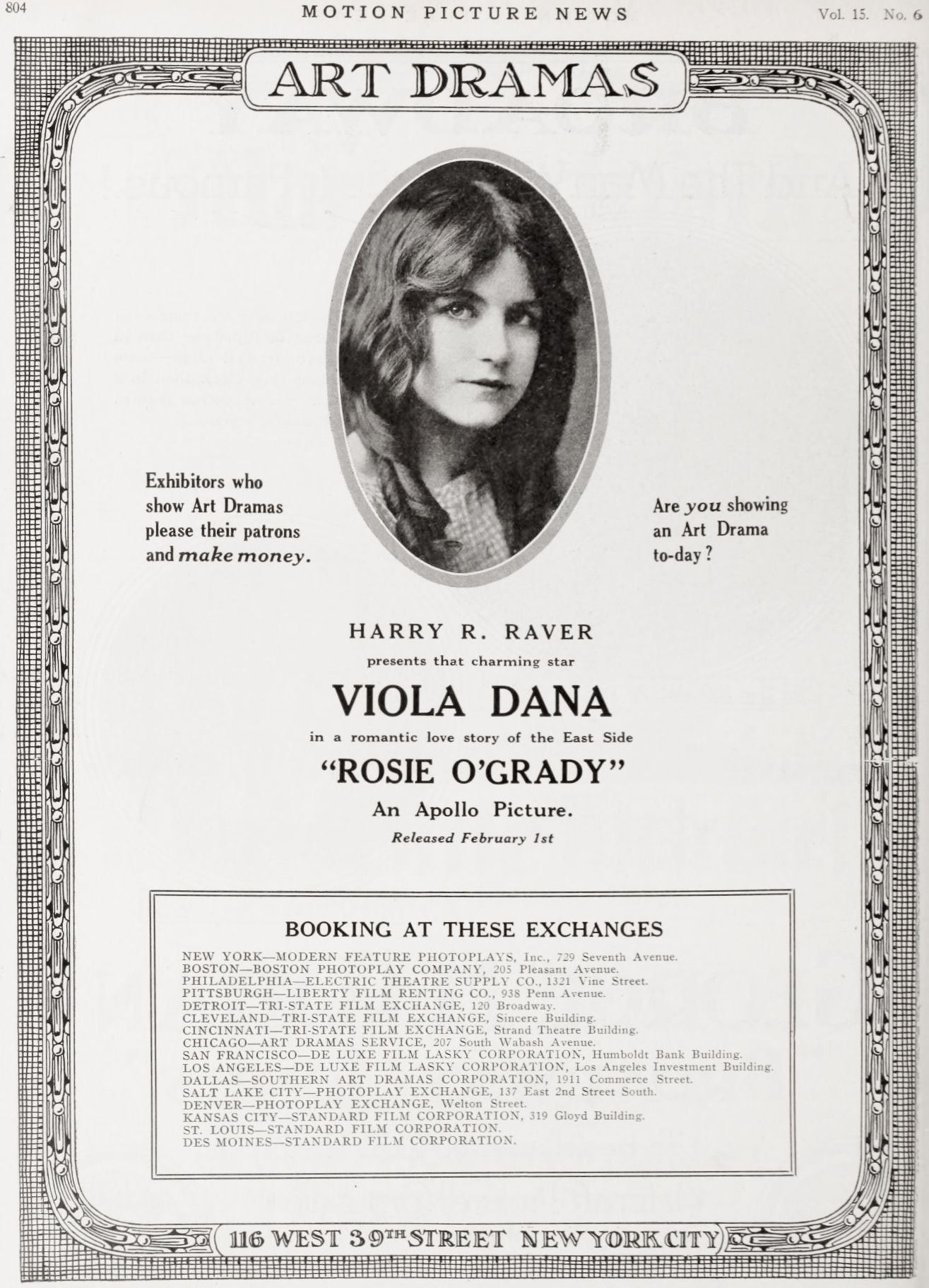
Advertisement for Rosie O'Grady

Alma Hanlon starred in their films. Harry R. Raver was president of the company. It supplied films to their affiliated distributor Art Dramas Inc.

John Sainpolis signed with the company to be in The Mystic Hour.

== Films ==
- God of Little Children (1917)
- Rosie O'Grady (1917)
- The Golden God (1917)
- The Mystic Hour (1917)
- When You and I Were Young (1917)
