= Adele Lacy =

American actress

Adele Lacy (born Adeline Charlotte Fergestad, September 8, 1910 – July 3, 1953) was an American film actress whose films all appeared during the Great Depression. Her name was sometimes spelled Adele Lacey.

== Early life ==
Born as in Minnesota on September 8, 1910, she was the daughter of Morris and Mina Fergestad. With her parents, she grew up in Minneapolis, Minnesota with an older brother, C. Marvin Fergestad. She was of Norwegian heritage. She attended the Junior School of Expression, Jefferson Junior High School, and West High School in Minneapolis and began acting in local productions at an early age.

At the age of 15 in 1926, she joined Gus Edwards' Juvenile Frolic dance troupe while they were performing in Hennipin. She had received her education in dance from Helen Noble. Later that year she was made the face of Minneapolis Candy Company, Sweetest Maid, and named "Miss Sweetest Maid". She left for Hollywood shortly after joining Edwards' group and finished her public education at Hollywood High School in 1928.

== Career ==
After moving to Hollywood, California Lacy appeared in eleven films. She appeared in three credited movies and an additional eight un-credited movies. In 1932, in her first released movie, she was credited as the number two as "Diane Melville" behind only the film's star, Tom Tyler, in Vanishing Men. Later in 1932, she was credited as the number two as "Judy Flagg" behind only the film's star, Lane Chandler in The Wyoming Whirlwind. Her final credited role was as the number two "Ruth Davis" behind the star, Tom Tyler, in When a Man Rides Alone. She had uncredited roles in an additional eight movies. Her first uncredited role was in 1932's The Kid from Spain. Her second un-credited role was in what was likely the most famous motion picture in which she ever appeared; she was a Chorus Girl in the famed 1933 release, 42nd Street (film).

As a member of the Goldwyn Girls, her role as a dancer in The Kid from Spain was praised in 1932. In 1933, she appeared in several musical scenes of a series of musical westerns starring Lane Chandler. In 1935, she was a featured dancer in Redheads on Parade starring John Boles and Dixie Lee. In 1936, she was a dancer in The Great Ziegfeld. Over her career, Lacy starred in musicals and westerns, and she was also a pinup girl and chorus girl. While in films, she worked with Tex Ritter, Hoot Gibson, and Eddie Cantor.

By 1938, with her last uncredited movie being back in 1936, her career had taken a different path. She was a special correspondent in Shanghai, China for a news syndicate. However, this was a short term assignment since passenger lists show that she was back in Los Angeles, California later in November 1938.

== Personal life ==
Before the 1930 census was enumerated, she was married to movie still photographer Madison S. Lacy (1898-1978). Lacy's second marriage was to director Walter Futter (1900-1958) in December 1937.

During World War II, she had crossed the Atlantic Ocean to produce musicals in England with an amateur cast to entertain the troops. In 1945-1953, the Futters lived in the New York City suburb bedroom community of Plainfield, New Jersey for the last eight years of her life.

She died in Mexico City, Mexico on July 3, 1953.

== Films ==
All release dates are in the USA.

- The release on April 15, 1932, Vanishing Men
- The release on November 17, 1932, The Kid from Spain
- The release on December 30, 1932, The Wyoming Whirlwind aka Roaring Rider aka The Texas Tornado
- The release on January 15, 1933, When a Man Rides Alone
- The release on February 23, 1933, 42nd Street
- The release on May 27, 1933, Gold Diggers Of 1933
- The release on October 21, 1933, Footlight Parade which was a film for which, according to the good folks at tcm.com, she had done at least one 'Publicity Still'
- The release on April 27, 1934, Twenty Million Sweethearts
- The release on August 16, 1934, Dames
- The release on September 7, 1935, Redheads On Parade
- The release on April 8, 1936, The Great Ziegfeld
