= Rosie O'Grady =

1917 silent film

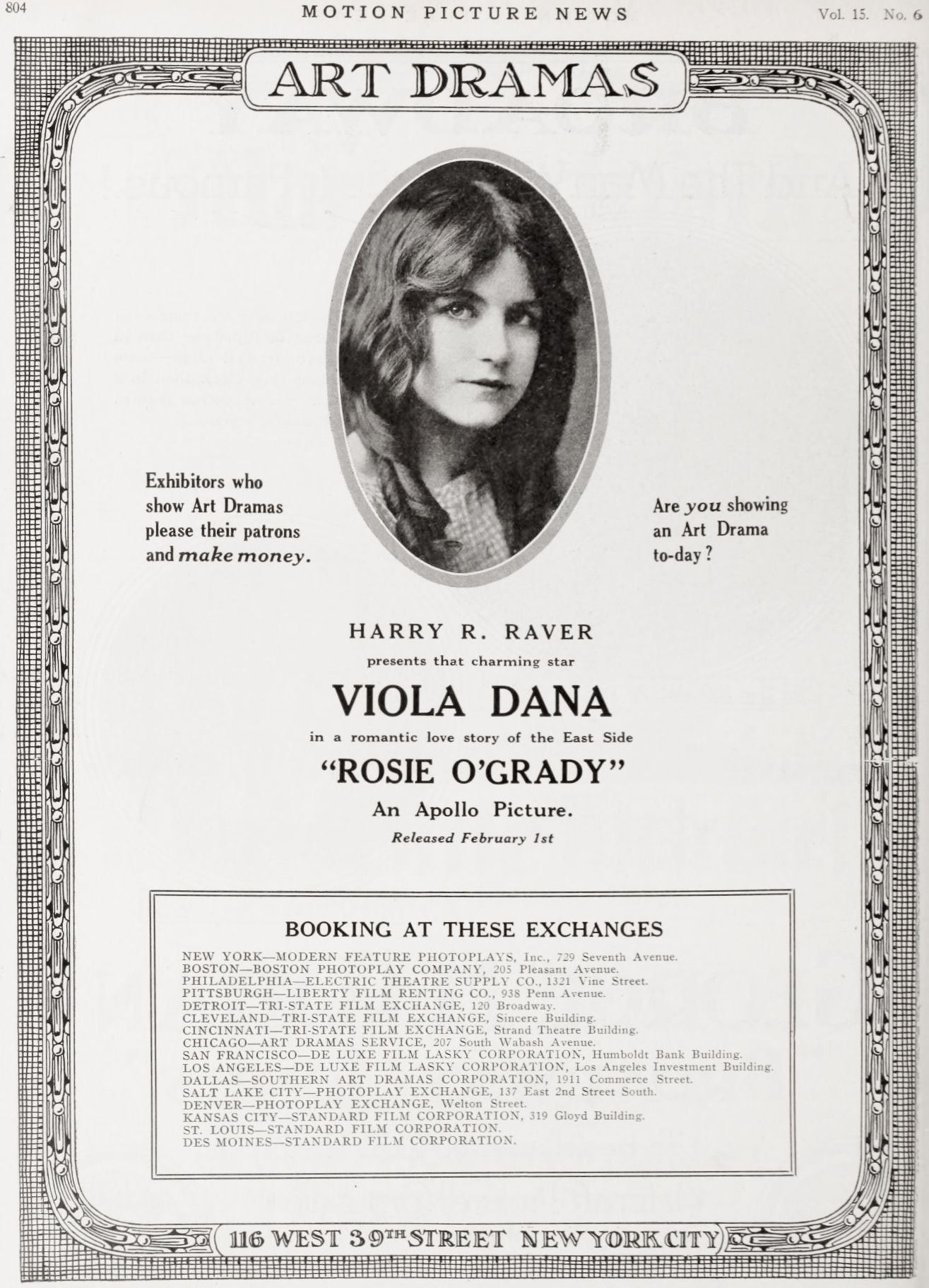
- Directed by: John H. Collins
- Written by: John H. Collins
- Starring: Viola Dana; Tom Blake; James Harris
- Cinematography: John Arnold
- Production company: Apollo Pictures
- Distributed by: Art Dramas
- Release date: February 1, 1917
- Running time: 50 minutes
- Country: United States
- Languages: Silent; English intertitles

Rosie O'Grady is a 1917 American silent drama film directed by John H. Collins and starring Viola Dana, Tom Blake and James Harris.

== Cast ==
- Viola Dana as Rosie O'Grady
- Tom Blake as Chimmie
- James Harris as Johnny Allen

== Bibliography ==
- Slide, Anthony. The New Historical Dictionary of the American Film Industry. Routledge, 2014.
