= Raymond Keane =

American actor

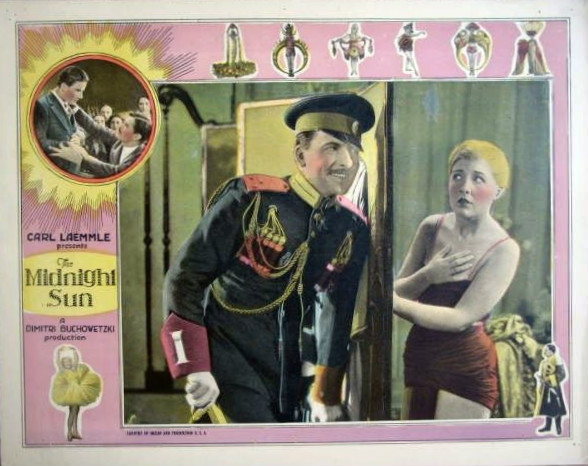
Raymond Keane and Laura La Plante in The Midnight Sun (1926)

Raymond Keane, born Raymond Kortz, (1906–1973) was an American actor during the silent film era. He was tall and striking. He was the son of jeweler Harry Kortz. He died in Los Angeles.

== Selected filmography ==
- The Midnight Sun (1926)
- April Fool (1926)
- The Lone Eagle (1927)
- The Magic Garden (1927)
- How to Handle Women (1928)
- The Power of Silence (1928)
- Marriage by Contract (1928)
- Hello Sister (1930)
- Loose Ankles (1930)
- Vanishing Men (1932)
