= Hollywood High School =

Public high school in Hollywood, California

Hollywood Senior High
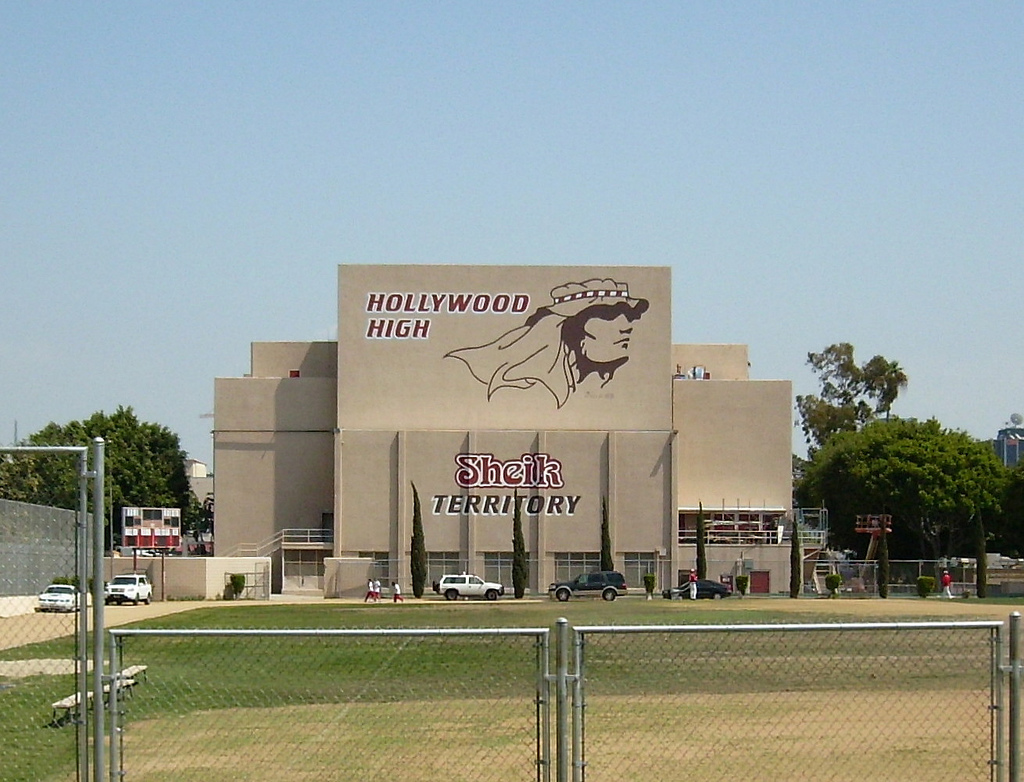
- Hollywood High School in Hollywood, Los Angeles

Location
- 1521 North Highland Avenue; Los Angeles, California 90028; United States; 34.099°N 118.340°W

Information
- School type: Public, high school
- Motto: Achieve The Honorable
- Established: 1903; 123 years ago
- Locale: City, Large
- School district: Los Angeles Unified School District
- NCES District ID: 0622710
- NCES School ID: 062271003088
- Principal: Samuel Dovlatian (2021–present)
- Teaching staff: 64.29 (on an FTE basis)
- Grades: 9–12
- Enrollment: 1,025 (2024–25)
  - Male: 467
  - Female: 558
- Student to teacher ratio: 15.94
- Colors: Crimson and White
- Mascot: Sheiks
- Website: www.hollywoodhighschool.net
- Hollywood High School Historic District
- U.S. National Register of Historic Places
- U.S. Historic district
- Built: 1910 et seq.
- Architects: Marsh, Powell & Smith; Marston & Weston
- Architectural style: Art Moderne
- NRHP reference No.: 11000989
- Added to NRHP: January 4, 2012
- Last updated: February 24, 2019; 7 years ago

Hollywood High School is a four-year public secondary school in the Los Angeles Unified School District, located at the intersection of North Highland Avenue and West Sunset Boulevard in the Hollywood district of Los Angeles, California. As of the 2024–25 school year, the school served 1,025 students, with a student-teacher ratio of 15.94.

== History ==
In September 1903, a two-room school was opened on the second floor of an empty storeroom at the Masonic Temple on Highland Avenue, north of Hollywood Boulevard (then Prospect Avenue). Hollywood was incorporated as a municipality in November 1903. The Hollywood High Organ Opus 481 was a gift from the class of 1924. After suffering severe water damage from the Northridge earthquake in 1994, it was restored in 2002. The campus was listed on the National Register of Historic Places on January 4, 2012. The school's mascot was derived from the 1921 Rudolph Valentino film of the same name, The Sheik.

It was in the Los Angeles City High School District until 1961, when it merged into LAUSD.

In the 2015–16 football season, the boys' varsity football team played in the school's third championship game led by head coach Frank Galvan. They finished the season with a 12–2 record. Coach Galvan ended his 6-year Hollywood coaching career with 4 league titles, 6 playoff appearances, 1 city championship appearance, city semi finals, beating rivals 5 years straight (owning SUNSET), 25 plus all city players and ended as the winningest coach in Hollywood history. In the 2016–17 season, coached by Beverley Kilpatrick, the boys' varsity volleyball team played in the school's first-ever championship game. Their historic season ended with an overall record of 17–5.

== Filming location ==
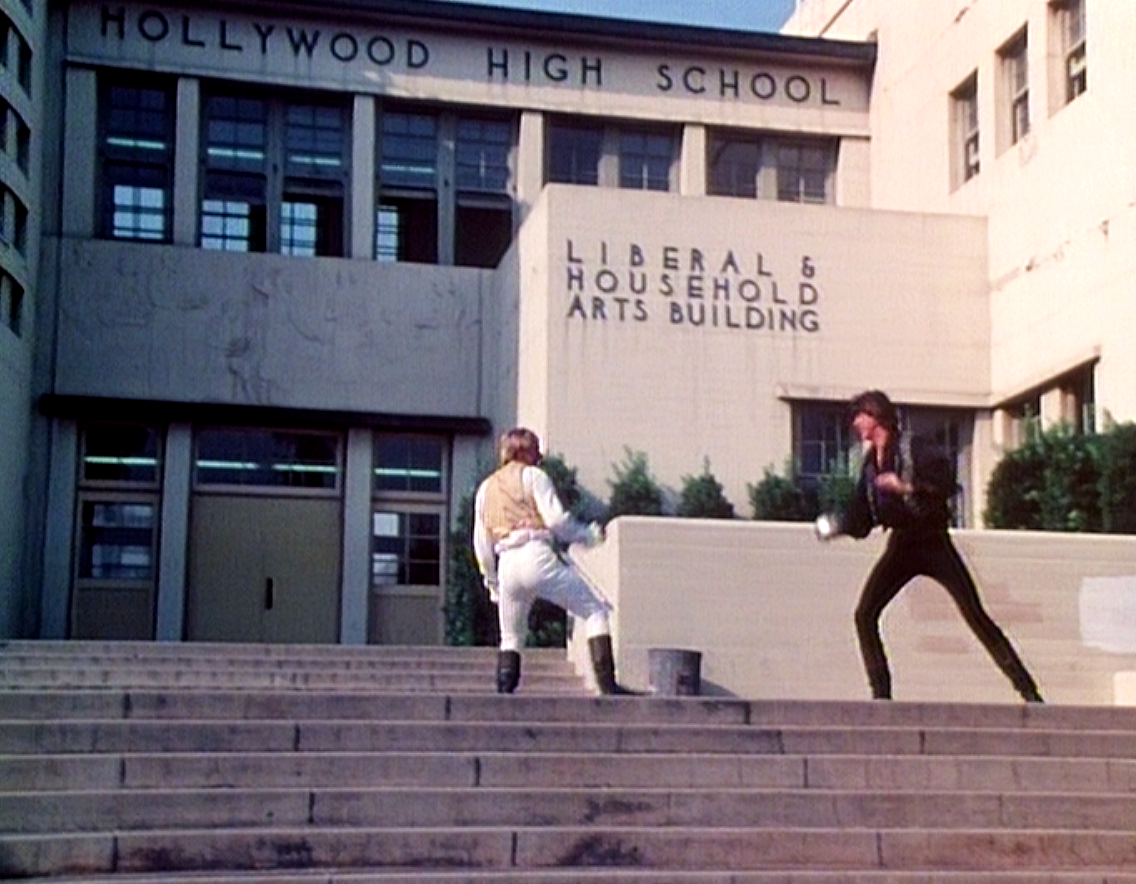
A scene from The Optimist (Season 1, Episode 7: "A Challenge"), filmed at the school in 1982

Hollywood High has been the filming location for movies, television shows, and other productions, including:

- It's A Wonderful Life
- Made
- Morrissey: 25 Live
- Nancy Drew
- Neon Maniacs
- The Optimist (Season 1, Episode 7: "A Challenge")
- Penn & Teller: Bullshit! (Season 5, Episode 1: "Obesity")
- Sex and the Teenage Mind
- Teenagers from Outer Space
- Tony Hawk's American Wasteland

== Skate spot ==
During the rise of street skating in the '90s, the school became a famous skate spot. Many skate videos were filmed there and one of the more iconic sites at the spot is the set of stairs, called the "Hollywood High 16."

== Mural ==
In 2002, artist Eloy Torrez painted a mural of 13 famous entertainers, titled "Portrait of Hollywood", across the entire east wall of the school's auditorium. From left to right, the entertainers displayed are Dorothy Dandridge, Dolores del Río, Brandy Norwood, Selena, Lana Turner, Laurence Fishburne, Cantinflas, Carol Burnett, Cher, Ricky Nelson, Bruce Lee, Rudolph Valentino, and Judy Garland. In 2007, Torrez added a 50-foot (15 m) tall mural of John Ritter, who died four years earlier, on the connecting portion of the building's north wall. All but six of the entertainers—Cantinflas, Lee, Selena, Del Rio, Garland, and Valentino—were students at Hollywood High School. The artist said the mural is a celebration of a diverse ethnic range of actors and entertainers.

== Present-day learning academies ==
Hollywood High School has four academies, each with a different purpose.

Teaching Career Academy. For students who seek to work with children as a career. Potential careers range from becoming a teacher to being a social worker. In order to give a student a little experience, the school works with other elementary schools and allows Hollywood High School students to tutor elementary school students.

Performing Arts Magnet. Helps students develop their talents as actors, singers, and/or dancers.

New Media Technology. For students who would like to go into filmmaking. Helps students build their knowledge of technology. They are afforded hands-on experience with equipment usually found inside a film studio. This academy also provides internships to permit graduates to immediately start working in that field.

School for Advanced Studies. This academy does not focus on a specific career but helps students prepare for university life. Offers classes that are at the same level of difficulty as a college class.

== Gallery ==
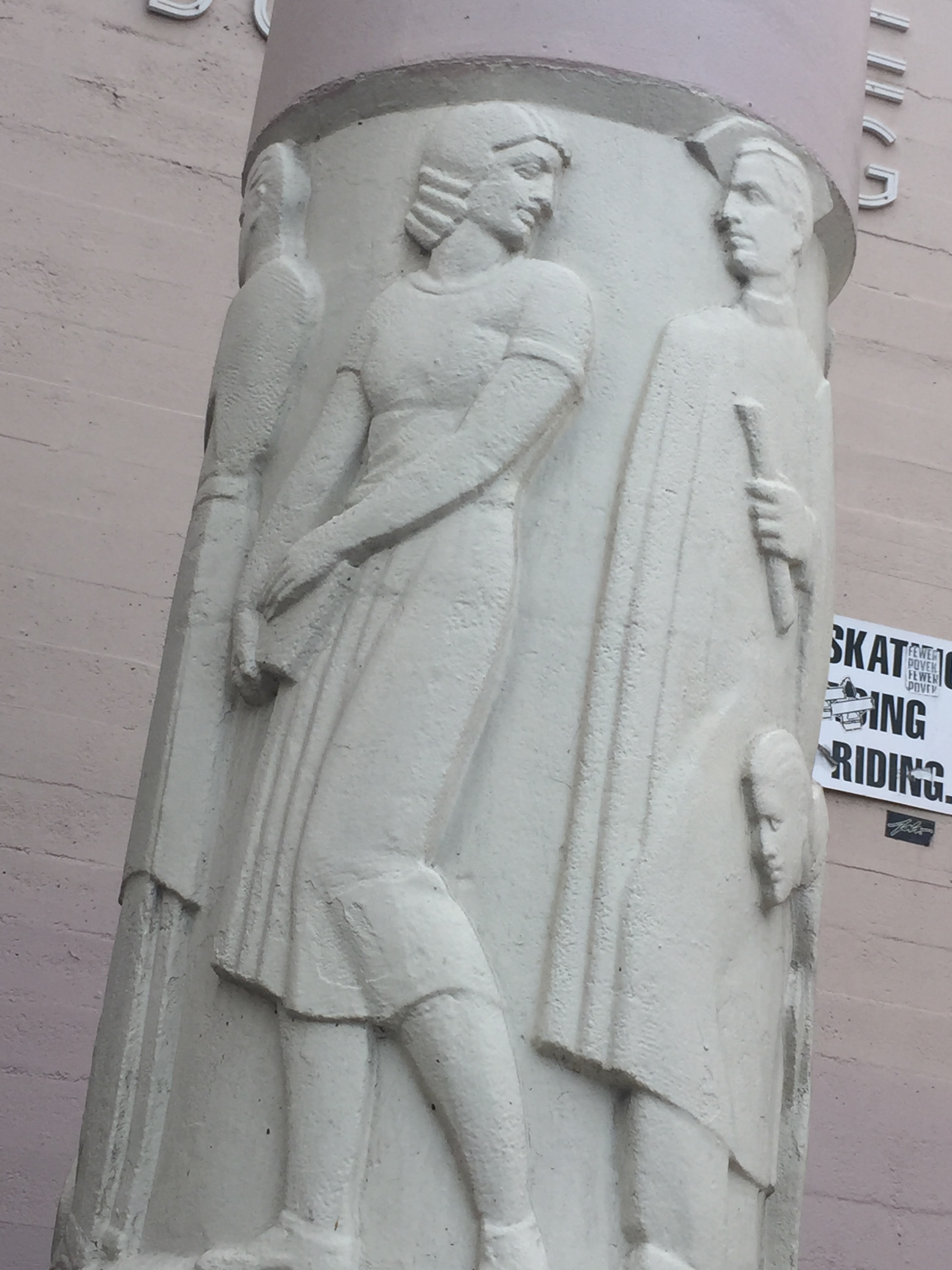

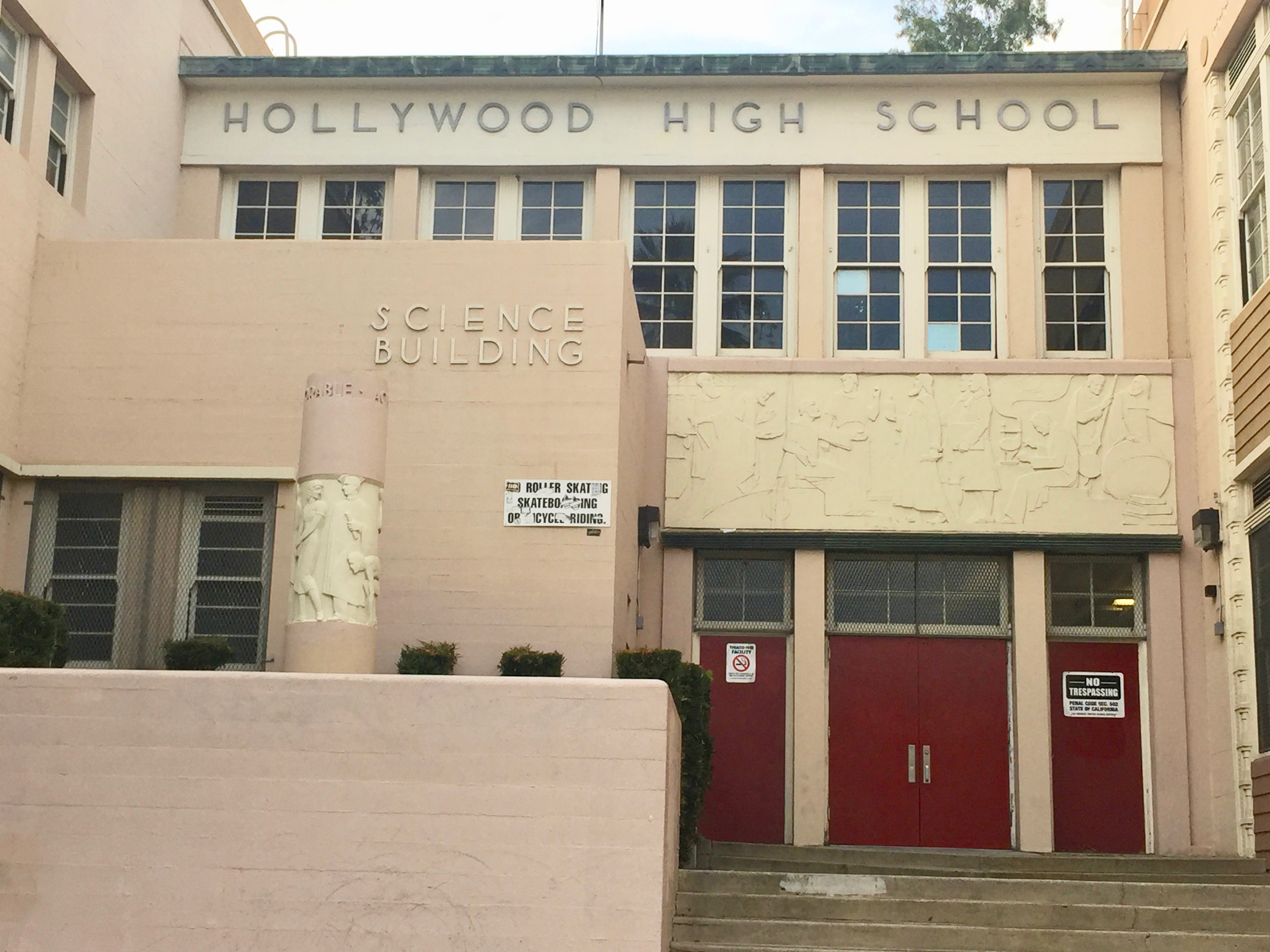

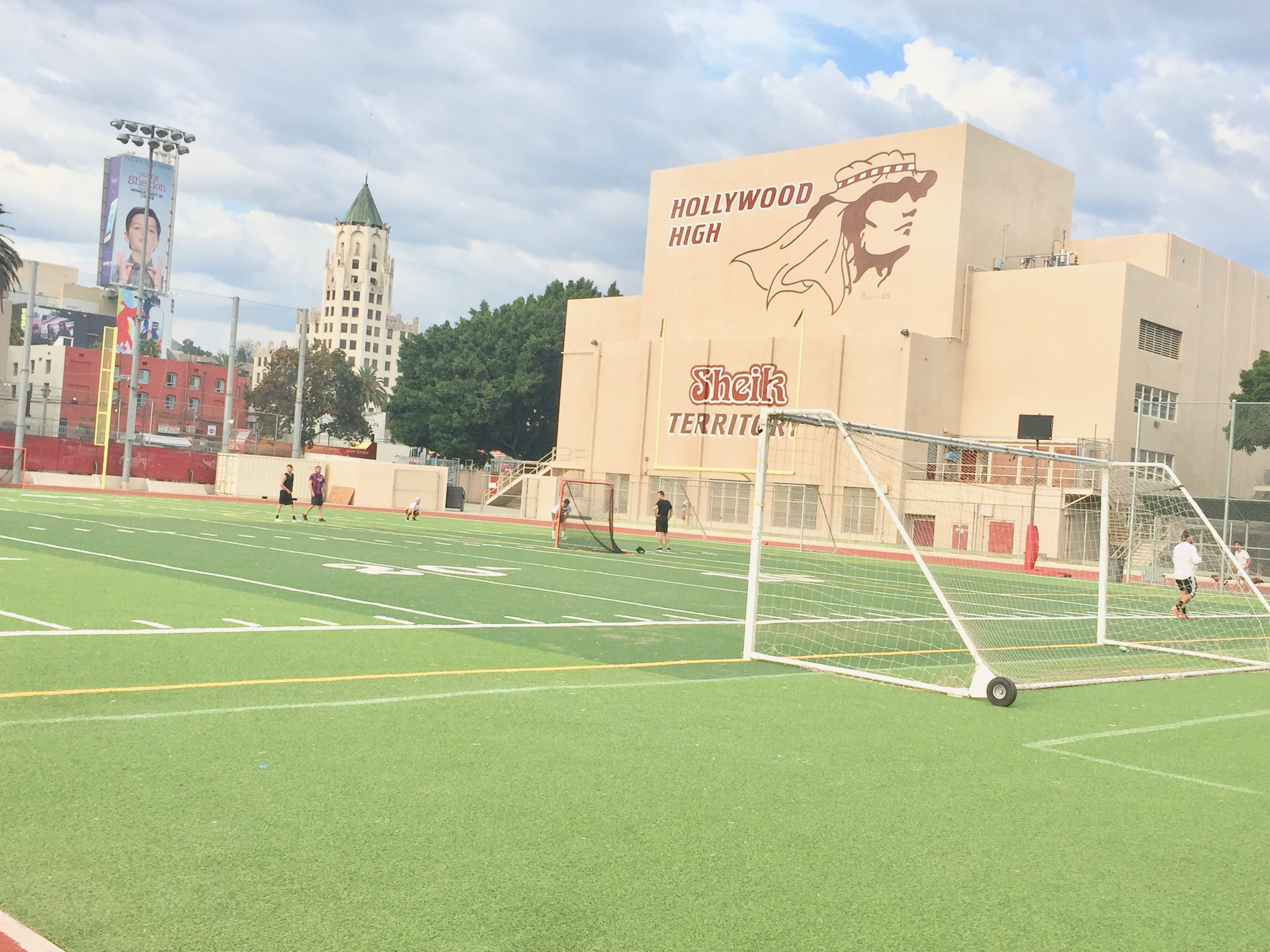

== Notable alumni ==
Name	Class of	Note(s)	Reference
India Adams	1945	Singer, Actress	
John F. Aiso	1926	WW2 Army Legion of Merit recipient, first Japanese American judge in the US.	
Frank Albertson	192?	Actor	
Ben Alexander	1929	Actor	
Kathryn Reed Altman	1942	Actress, writer, archivist, film consultant	
Anthony Anderson	1988	Actor, comedian, writer	
Donna Anderson	1957	Actress	
John Archer	1933	Actor	
Bill Armstrong	–	Football player	
Alison Arngrim	1979	Actress	
Vivian Austin	1939	Actress	
Eve Babitz	1961	Artist, author	
Meredith Baxter	1964	Actress	
Tony Becker	1981	Actor	
Earl Bellamy	1935	Film Director	
Bruce Belland	1955	Singer, The Four Preps	
Mary Kay Bergman	1978	Actress	
Sharon Brown	1980	Actress	
Vincent Bugliosi	1952	Attorney, author	
Carol Burnett	1950	Actress, comedian	
Bill Burrud	1943	Actor	
Diana Canova	1971	Actress, singer	
Keith Carradine	1966	Actor	
Robert Carradine	1971	Actor	
Adriana Caselotti	1934	Actress, singer	
Peggy Castle	1943	Actress	
Henry P. Caulfield Jr.	1931	Political scientist, college professor	
Marge Champion	1936	Dancer, choreographer, actress	
Norman Chandler	1917	Los Angeles Times publisher	
Lon Chaney Jr.	1924	Actor	
Rae Dawn Chong	1979	Actress	
Warren Christopher	1942	U.S. Secretary of State	
John Clifford	1965	Choreographer, dancer, director, producer	
Ed Cobb	1956	Singer, The Four Preps	
Lisa Coleman	1978	Musician	
Jackie Condon	1936	Actor	
Johnny Crawford	1964	Actor, The Mickey Mouse Club	
Denise Crosby	1976	Actress	
James Dannaldson	–	Actor	
Elyssa Davalos	1977	Actress	
Frank Darabont	1977	Film director, screenwriter, producer	
Jorel Decker	–	Singer	
Rod Dedeaux	1931	longtime USC Trojans baseball head coach	
Edward Dmytryk	1926	Film director, member of the Hollywood Ten	
Harley Earl	–	Automotive designer and executive	
P. David Ebersole	1981	Filmmaker	
Stephen Eckelberry	1979	Filmmaker	
Norman Eisen	1980	U.S. Ambassador to Czech Republic	
Marguerite Empey	1949	Model	
Linda Evans	1960	Actress	
Nanette Fabray	1938	Actress	
Mimsy Farmer	1963	Actress	
Mike Farrell	1957	Actor	
Lorraine Feather	1965	Singer, lyricist, songwriter	
Jay R. Ferguson	1992	Actor	
Syd Field	1954	Screenwriter, Author	
Laurence Fishburne	1978	Actor	After filming Apocalypse Now, Laurence attended a semester at HHS in 1978. He was enrolled mid-semester, taking drama from long-time teacher, Mr. Melton.
Anthony M. Frank	1949	U.S. Postmaster General	
James Garner	1945	Actor	
Mitzi Gaynor	–	Actress	
Lowell George	1963	Musician, songwriter, producer	
Gigi Graciette		Journalist, TV News Anchor	
Gloria Grahame	1942	Actress	
Gigi Levangie Grazer	1979	Novelist, screenwriter	
Harold Grieve	1915–1917	Motion Picture Art Director	
Rob Grill	1962	Singer, songwriter, guitarist	
Horacio Gutiérrez	1966	Classical pianist	
Alan Hale Jr.	1938	Actor	
Richard Halsey	1957	Film editor	
Linda Hart	1965	Singer, musician, actress	
Francisco Herrera		Los Angeles Dodgers ball boy	
Julius Heldman	1934	tennis player	
Barbara Hershey	1965	Actress	
Karl Hubenthal	1935	Cartoonist	
John Huston	1923	Film director, screenwriter, actor	
Eddie Imazu		Art director and production designer	
Richard Jaeckel	1943	Actor	
Lawrence Johnston	1936	Manhattan Project physicist, the only person to witness all 3 atom bombs of WWII	
Chuck Jones	1930	Animator	
Dickie Jones	1945	Actor	
Peter E. Kaus	1940	Physicist	
Frank Keller	1940	Film Editor, 1968 Academy Award	
Sally Kellerman	1955	Actress	
William Kennard	1974	U.S. Federal Communications Commission chairman	
Barbara Kent	1924	actress, Miss Hollywood	
Enid Kent	1962	actress	
Lois Kibbee	1940	actress	
Lynton Richards Kistler		printmaker, artist	
Frank Kurtz	1930	World War II pilot	
Swoosie Kurtz	1962	Actress	
Adele Lacy	1928	Actress	
Glen A. Larson	1955	Producer, Singer, The Four Preps	
John Phillip Law	1955	Actor	
Ted Lawson	1935	Author	
Ruta Lee	1954	Actress	
Donovan Leitch	1985	Actor	
Al Leong	1970	Stuntman, Actor	
Dick Linthicum	1927	Basketball player	
Carole Lombard	1923	Actress	
Richard Long	1946	Actor	
Bill Manbo	1929	Photographer	
Stephen Marglin	–	Economist, college professor	
June Marlowe	1922	Actress	
Benito Martinez	1986	Actor	
Lincoln Mayorga		Pianist, arranger, conductor and composer; co-founder of The Mastering Lab and Sheffield Lab	
Gladys McConnell	1924	Actress, aviator	
Joel McCrea	1922	Actor	
Leighton Meester	2004	Actress, singer	
Heather Menzies	1967	Actress	
Ann Miller	1937	Dancer, actress, singer	
Judith Miller	1965	Journalist	
Aprile Millo	1977	Opera singer	
Yvette Mimieux	1960	Actress	
Jean Moorhead	1953	Actress	
Karen Morley	1927	Actress	
David Nelson	1954	Actor, producer	
Ricky Nelson	1957	Actor, singer	
Marni Nixon	1948	Singer	
Sheree North	1948	Actress	
Brandy Norwood	1996	Singer, actress	
Marcel Ophüls	1946	Film director	
Sarah Jessica Parker	1983	Actress	
Barbara Parkins	1960	Actress	
Susan Patron	1965	Author	
Radames Pera	1977	Actor	
Cynthia Pepper	1957	Actress	
Richard Perle	1959	U.S. Assistant Secretary of Defense	
Susan Peters	1939	Actress	
James A. Pike	1930	Episcopal Bishop of California	
Stefanie Powers	1960	Actress	
Terry Richardson	1983	Photographer	
John Ritter	1966	Actor	
Jason Robards	1940	Actor	
Ann Robinson	1949	Actress	
Ruth Roland	1908	Actress	
Mickey Rooney	1937	Actor	Mickey stated at the HHS Centennial that he attended Fairfax High School. He only came to HHS to find girls. He is not an HHS Alum.
Fred Roos	–	Film producer	
Meta Rosenberg	1930	Talent agent, television producer	
George Roth	192?	1932 Olympic Gold Medalist	
Debbie Rowe	1977	Ex-wife of singer Michael Jackson	
Evelyn Rudie	1967	Actress	
Everett Ruess	–	Artist, poet, wanderer	
Paul Salamunovich	1945	Conductor, Musician	
Catherine Share	1960	"Manson Family" follower	
Scott Shaw	1976	Filmmaker, actor, writer	
William Shockley	1927	Physicist, inventor of the transistor, Nobel laureate	
Ione Skye	1986	Actress	
Michael Sloane	1976	Actor, writer, director	
Rick Sloane	1979	Filmmaker	
Alexis Smith	1938	Actress	
Darwood Kenneth Smith	1946	Actor	
Andrew Solt	1965	Film producer, director, and writer	
Louise Sorel	1957	Actress	
Mark Spiegler	1975	Talent agent	
Adela Rogers St. Johns	1910	Journalist, novelist, screenwriter	
Jill St. John	1957	Actress	
Don Steele	–	Boss Radio disc jockey	
Arran Stephens	1961	Nature's Path Foods Founder	
Togo Tanaka	1939	Journalist and editor	
Vince Taylor	1958	Singer	
Hilary Thompson	1966	Actress	
Charlene Tilton	1976	Actress	
Virginia Trimble	1961	Astronomer	
Joe Trippi	–	Political activist, chairman of the Howard Dean U.S. presidential campaign	
Lana Turner	1936	Actress	
Victoria Vetri	1963	Model, actress, 1968 Playboy Playmate of the Year	
Michael G. Vickers	–	U.S. Under Secretary of Defense	
Larry Walters	1968	Lawnchair balloon pilot	
Joseph Wapner	1937	Judge, star of The People's Court	
Tuesday Weld	1960	Actress	
Carole Wells	1960	Actress	
Alice White	1925	Actress	
Stuart Whitman	1946	Actor	
Rhoda Williams	1948	Actress	
Rita Wilson	1974	Actress	
Beatrice Wood	–	Studio potter	
Fay Wray	1924	Actress	
