= The Golden God =

1917 film

- Written by: Frederick Rath; Robert Hage
- Produced by: Harry R. Raver
- Starring: Alma Hanlon; Florence Short
- Production companies: Apollo Pictures, Inc.
- Distributed by: Art Dramas, Inc.
- Release date: June 14, 1917
- Running time: 5 reels
- Country: USA
- Language: Silent (English intertitles)

The Golden God is a 1917 American silent drama film written by Robert Hage and Frederick Rath. The film stars Charles Hutchison, Alma Hanlon, Florence Short, and Mary Doyle. It premiered on June 19, 1917.

== Cast ==
- Alma Hanlon as Mary
- Florence Short as Estelle
- Mary Doyle as Ruth
- Charles Hutchinson as George
- Al Stearn as Morton
- William Hartman as Slatterly
- M. Dudley as Daniels

== Censorship ==
Before The Golden God could be exhibited in Kansas, the Kansas Board of Review required the removal of the love scene between Estelle and George in reel 4.
