= Bill Armstrong (guard) =

American football player (1920–1976)

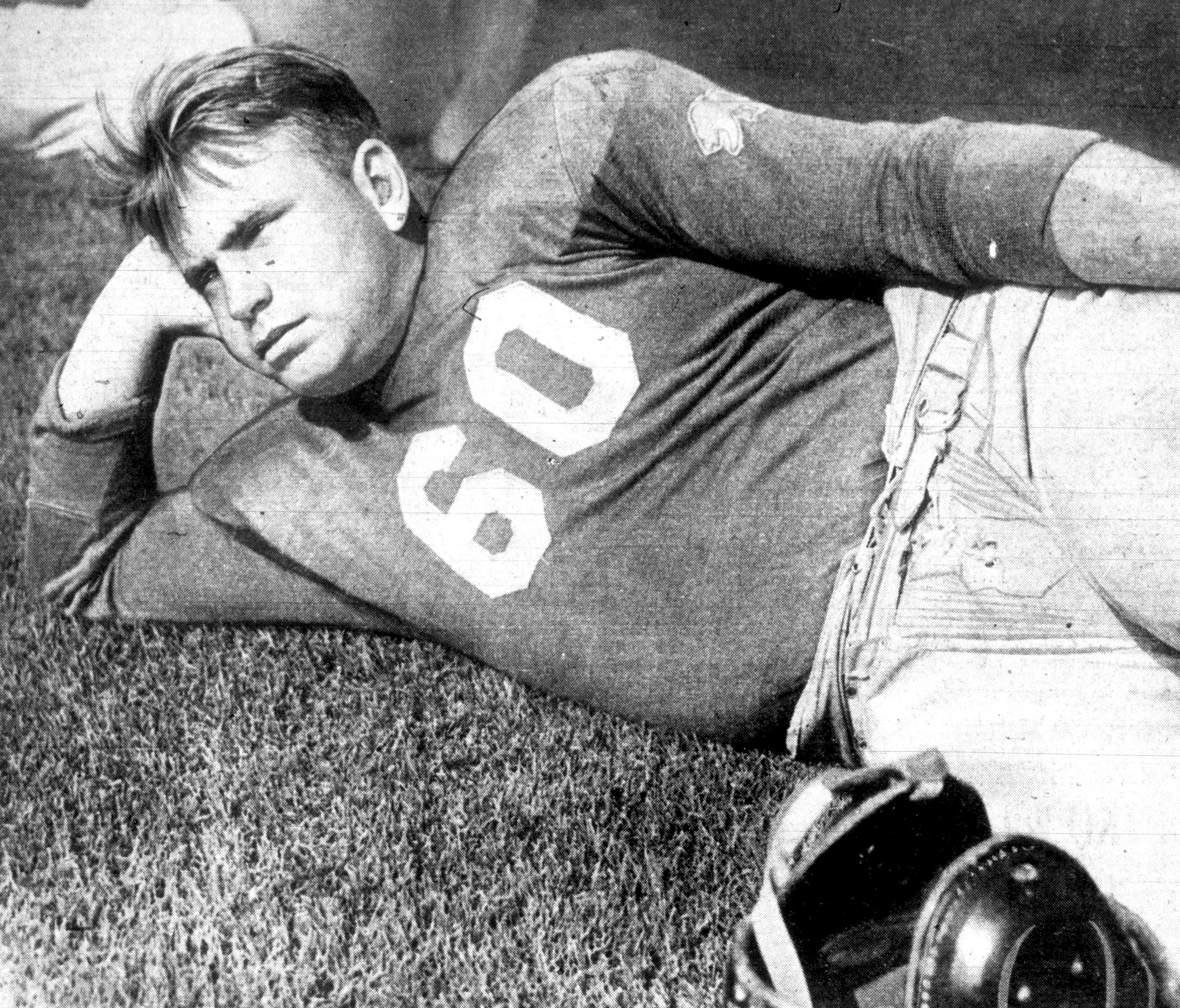
- Armstrong, circa 1942

No. 28
- Position: Guard

Personal information
- Born: October 27, 1920
- Died: October 3, 1976 (aged 55)
- Listed height: 6 ft 1 in (1.85 m)
- Listed weight: 210 lb (95 kg)

Career information
- High school: Hollywood (Los Angeles, California)
- College: UCLA (1939–1942)
- NFL draft: 1943: undrafted

Career history
- Brooklyn Dodgers (1943)
- Stats at Pro Football Reference

William Wright Armstrong (October 27, 1920 – October 3, 1976) was an American professional football guard who played one season with the Brooklyn Dodgers of the National Football League. He played college football at the University of California, Los Angeles.

== Early life and college ==
William Wright Armstrong was born on October 27, 1920. He attended Hollywood High School in Los Angeles, California.

He was a member of the UCLA Bruins from 1939 to 1942 and a three-year letterman from 1940 to 1942.

== Professional career ==
Armstrong signed with the Brooklyn Dodgers of the National Football League on October 27, 1943. He played in four games for the Dodgers during the 1943 season. He became a free agent after the season.

== Personal life ==
Armstrong served in the United States Army. He died on October 3, 1976, at the age of 55.
