= Vanishing Men =

1932 film

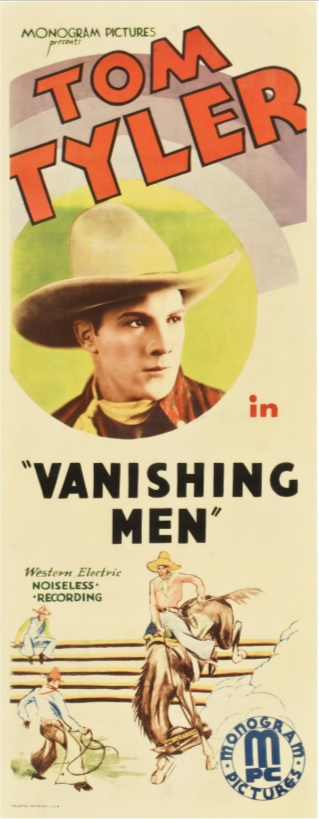
- Insert-format film poster
- Directed by: Harry L. Fraser
- Written by: Wellyn Totman
- Starring: Tom Tyler; Adele Lacy; Raymond Keane
- Production company: Trem Carr Productions
- Distributed by: Monogram Pictures
- Release date: April 15, 1932
- Running time: 62 minutes
- Country: United States
- Language: English

Vanishing Men is a 1932 American Western film directed by Harry L. Fraser and starring Tom Tyler, Adele Lacy, and Raymond Keane. The film depicts the story of Russ Whitely (Keane), a young man who has become involved with cattle rustling, his complicated relationship with Sheriff Doug Barrett (Tyler), and his eventual redemption. Critical reception to the film was mixed, and it is now believed to be a lost film.

== Plot ==
Russ Whitely has become involved in Heck Claiborne's cattle rustling. Facing arrest by Sheriff Doug Barrett, Claiborne's associate Luke Grimes shoots and kills O'Hara, the sheriff's deputy. Barrett asks Diane Melville to help influence Whitely to abandon his criminal connections, and hires gunslinger Bat Morrison as his new deputy. Morrison kills Grimes when he resists arrest. Claiborne informs Whitely of a plan to ambush and kill Barrett, but Whitely warns the sheriff. Unable to arrest the man who saved his life, Barrett resigns, and the new sheriff, Baker, tells Morrison to stop the rustlers. Morrison arrests Whitely, but Claiborne's gang meets them at the jail. Morrison shoots Whitely, and is killed in turn by Barrett. Baker arrests Claiborne and his gang, except the injured Whitely, who is allowed to return to his ranch and begin a new life.

== Cast ==
- Tom Tyler as Sheriff Doug Barrett
- Adele Lacy as Diane Melville
- Raymond Keane as Russ Whitely
- William L. Thorne as Bat Morrison
- John Elliott as Heck Claiborne
- Robert Seiter as O'Hara
- Charles King as Butch Grimes
- James A. Marcus as Baker
- Dick Dickinson as Luke Grimes

Hollywood Filmograph remarked on Raymond Keane's return to film acting after an absence of over a year. (Note: His previous film was Loose Ankles (1930).)

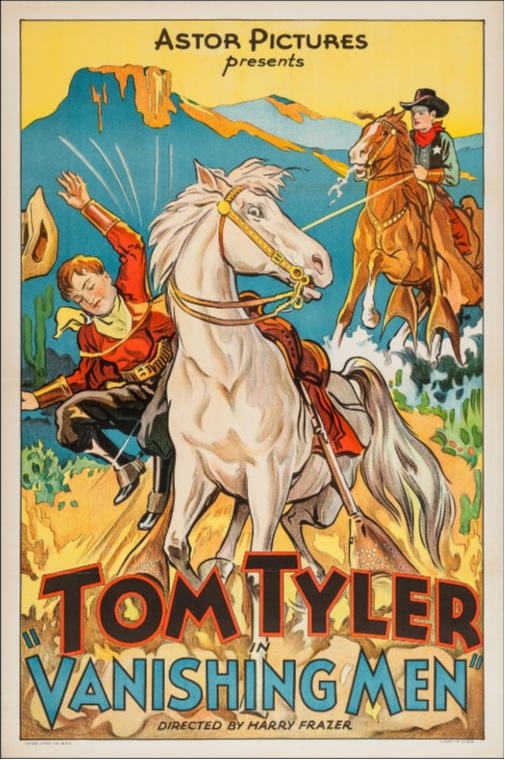
Film poster from the 1937 Astor Pictures re-release

== Production ==
In 1931, the newly formed Monogram Pictures announced the titles of its first 28 films, to be produced and released over the following year, including eight Westerns starring Tom Tyler. (Note: The others were Partners of the Trail, Galloping Thru, The Man from Death Valley, Two-Fisted Justice, Honor of the Mounted, Single-Handed Sanders, and The Man from New Mexico.) Vanishing Men was released in the United States on April 15, 1932, and in the UK on June 3. In 1937, the film was re-released by Astor Pictures.

== Reception and legacy ==
Critical reception of the film was mixed. Writing for the Motion Picture Herald, Rita McGoldrick did not regard the film positively, (Note: The film's "Good" rating was the lowest assigned; better pictures were considered "Very Good" or "Excellent".) and considered it most suited for an adult audience. The Los Angeles branch of the American Association of University Women wrote that the film offered "stilted" dialogue and "average entertainment value", but that its moral theme made it suitable for children as young as eight years old. Despite this initially mixed reception, The Film Daily's 1939 examination of the industry listed Vanishing Men as one of the Monogram films that "excited the admiration of followers" of the Western genre.

As with many of Monogram's films, Vanishing Men is believed to be lost.

== Bibliography ==
- Lifton, Louis S. (1939). "Monogram Pictures". In Alicoate, Jack (ed.). The Film Daily Presents Cavalcade: Yesterday, Today, Tomorrow of the Motion Picture Industry. The Film Daily. pp. 156–164. OCLC 9579962.
