= The Midnight Sun (1926 film) =

1926 film by Dimitri Buchowetzki

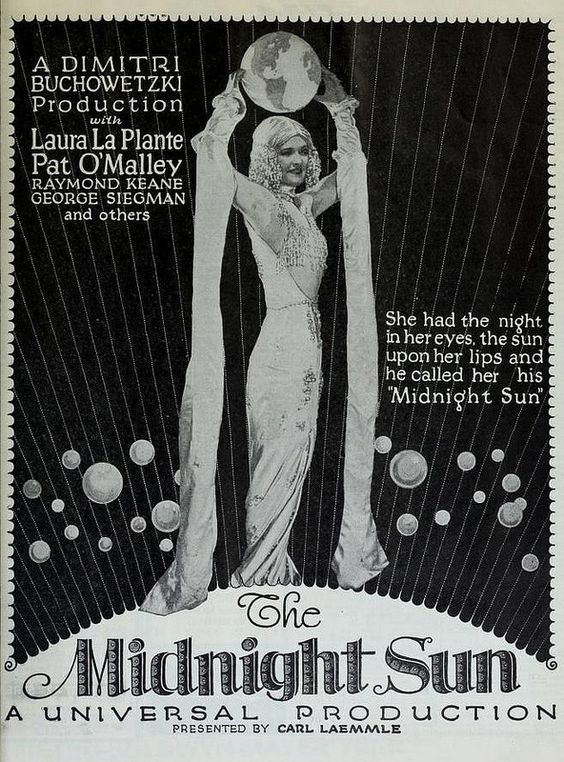
- Advertisement
- Directed by: Dimitri Buchowetzki
- Written by: Andrew Percival Younger
- Based on: Le Soleil de minuit by Pierre Benoît
- Produced by: Carl Laemmle
- Starring: Laura La Plante; Pat O'Malley; Michael Vavitch
- Cinematography: Jackson Rose; Ernest F. Smith
- Music by: Edward Kilenyi
- Production company: Universal Pictures
- Distributed by: Universal Pictures
- Release date: April 23, 1926
- Running time: 90 minutes
- Country: United States
- Language: Silent (English intertitles)

The Midnight Sun is a 1926 American silent drama film directed by Dimitri Buchowetzki and starring Laura La Plante, Pat O'Malley, and Michael Vavitch. It is based on a novel by the French writer Pierre Benoît. The film is set in pre-Revolutionary Tsarist Russia.

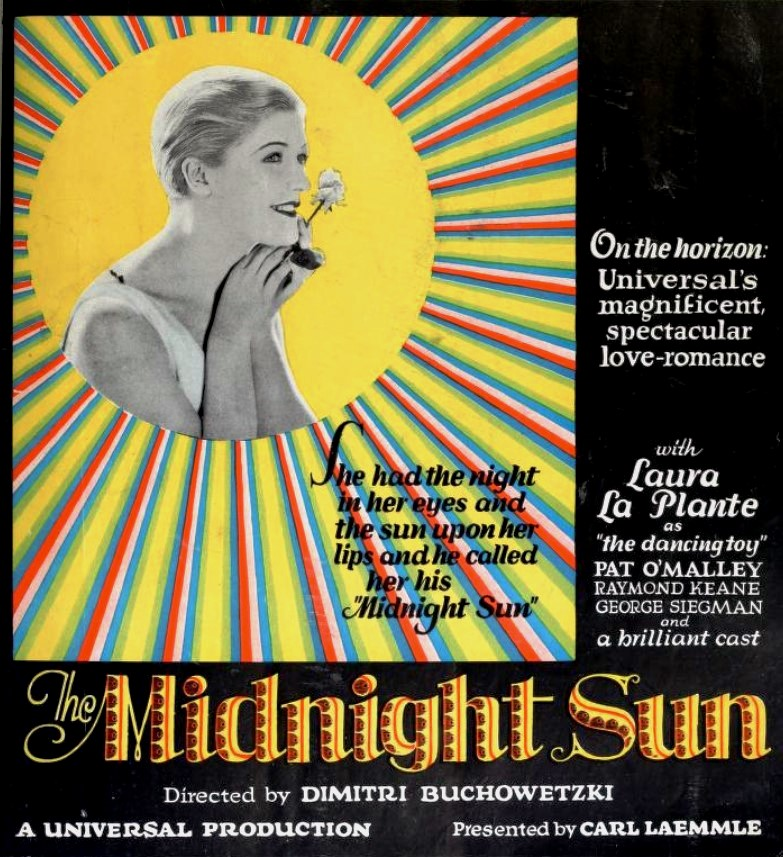
Ad in The Film Daily, 1926

The film includes a brief scene shot in Technicolor.

== Plot ==
As described in a film magazine, American Olga Morova dances in the Russian ballet where she is known as 'The Midnight Sun'. She has attracted the attentions of banker Ivan Kusmin, the Grand Duke Sergius, and young officer Alexei Orloff. She flirts with the first two but falls in love with Alexei. However, the young officer misinterprets her presence in the Grand Duke's chambers and slaps her, and as a result faces a court-martial where he is sentenced to death. Frantic with grief, Olga goes through many sacrifices and adventures, including incidents where a gunboat chases a yacht and a wild automobile ride, to save Alexei from execution. In the end she is successful, and the lovers are reunited.

== Cast ==
- Laura La Plante as Olga 'The Midnight Sun' Morova
- Pat O'Malley as Grand Duke Sergius of Russia
- Michael Vavitch as Duke's Adjutant
- Raymond Keane as Alexei Orloff, a Russian Officer
- Earl Metcalfe as Nicolai Orloff
- George Siegmann as Ivan Kusmin, a Banker
- Arthur Hoyt as Yessky, Kusmin's Secretary
- Medea Radzina as Anisya, Olga's Companion
- Nicholas Soussanin as Duke's Aide
- Cesare Gravina as Opera Director
- Nina Romano as Barbara
- Albert Prisco as Messenger
- George B. Williams as Ruined Banker
- Max Barwyn as Maitre D' (uncredited)
- Sayre Dearing as Young Russian Officer (uncredited)
- Louis Mercier as Russian Dissident (uncredited)
- Phillips Smalley as Card Player (uncredited)

== Production ==
Some on-location scenes were filmed in Truckee, California.

== Preservation ==
A complete print of The Midnight Sun is located in the UCLA Film & Television Archive. It has not been released to the public on DVD or other format.

== Bibliography ==
- Munden, Kenneth White. The American Film Institute Catalog of Motion Pictures Produced in the United States, Part 1. University of California Press, 1997.
