= Gold and the Woman =

1916 film directed by James Vincent

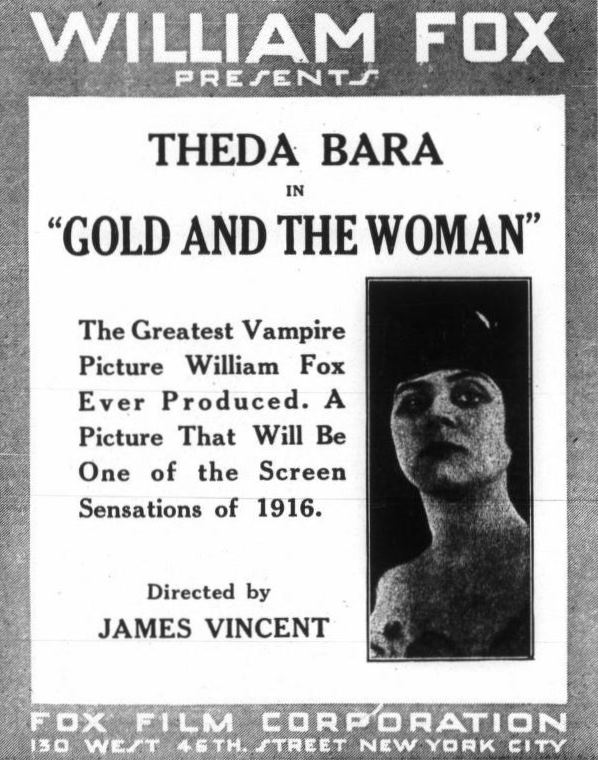
- Advertisement
- Directed by: James Vincent
- Written by: Mary Murillo; Daniel Roosevelt
- Produced by: William Fox
- Starring: Theda Bara; Alma Hanlon
- Distributed by: Fox Film Corporation
- Release date: March 13, 1916
- Running time: 60 minutes
- Country: United States
- Language: Silent (English intertitles)

Gold and the Woman is a 1916 American silent drama film directed by James Vincent and starring Theda Bara. It is considered a lost film.

== Plot ==
Dugald Chandos, an early English settler in America, tries to buy a thousand acres of land known as "The Valley of Shadow" from Chief Duskara of the Wiconicoes. Duskara refuses to sell the land and hides the land grant in a tree. Chandos and his son murder Duskara and then forge the chief's name to a deed transferring the property to the family. The dying wife of Duskara utters a curse against the Chandos family and its descendants, hoping to inflict blindness on them. Generations later, teenager Hester Gray is the descendant of Dugauld and the heir to "The Valley of Shadow". Lee Duskara, a Harvard student, is the great-great-grandson of the Native American chief. Hester and Lee fall in love. Lee asks Colonel Ernest Dent, Hester's guardian, for permission to marry her. Dent, who was a friend of Hester's father, has become involved with Juliet Cordova, a Mexican adventuress who is serving as his secretary. Juliet holds much influence over Dent, and he consults her on even the most trivial of matters. When Juliet learns that Lee plans to marry Hester, she seeks to prevent the marriage. Appearing innocent, she compromises Lee, causing Hester to reject him. Juliet covets the lucrativeness of the coal mines now on "The Valley of Shadow" and convinces Dent to marry Hester while continuing their affair. She lives with them after they are married, posing as Dent's secretary. Hester is stricken with blindness. At Juliet's persuasion, Dent tries to have Hester deed away her title to "The Valley of Shadow". Hester discovers Dent's affair when groping her way through his study and happening upon Juliet and Dent, asleep, embracing in a chair. She flees the house to commit suicide. Lee Duskara, who has established his title to "The Valley of Shadow", prevents her from carrying out her purpose. Dent dies, a victim of his self-indulgence. Lee again declares his love for Hester and is this time accepted.

== Cast ==
- Theda Bara as Theresa Decordova
- Alma Hanlon as Hester
- H. Cooper Cliffe as Colonel Ernest Dent
- Harry Hilliard as Lee Duskara
- Carleton Macy as Dugald Chandos
- Chief Black Eagle as Chief Duskara
- Julia Hurley as Duuskara's Squaw
- Carter B. Harkness as Leelo Duskara
- Caroline Harris as Undetermined Role
- Ted Griffin as Undetermined Role
- Louis Stern as Undetermined Role
- James Sheehan as Undetermined Role
- Frank Whitson as Montrevor
- Pauline Barry as Ethel
- Hattie Delaro as Nurse
- Howard Missimer as Finlay
- B. Reeves Eason Jr.
- Joseph Hamlsh as Murray
- Frances Ne Moyer as Murray's Daughter
- George Walsh as Lee Duskara

== See also ==
- List of lost films
- 1937 Fox vault fire
- List of Fox Film films
