= 42nd Street (film) =

1933 musical film

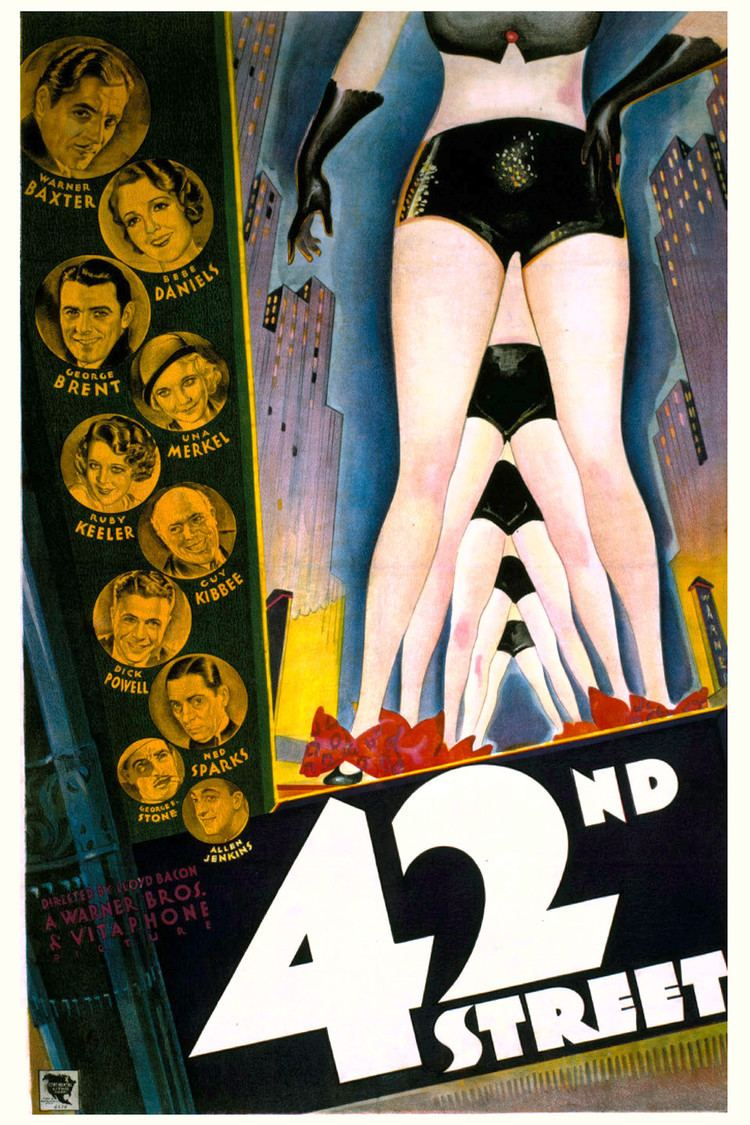
- Theatrical release poster
- Directed by: Lloyd Bacon
- Screenplay by: Rian James; James Seymour
- Based on: 42nd Street; 1932 novel by Bradford Ropes
- Produced by: Darryl F. Zanuck
- Starring: Warner Baxter; Bebe Daniels; George Brent; Una Merkel; Ruby Keeler; Guy Kibbee; Ginger Rogers; Dick Powell; Ned Sparks; George E. Stone; Allen Jenkins
- Cinematography: Sol Polito
- Edited by: Thomas Pratt; Frank Ware
- Music by: Harry Warren (music); Al Dubin (lyrics)
- Production company: Warner Bros. Pictures
- Distributed by: Warner Bros. Pictures
- Release dates: March 9, 1933 (Strand Theatre); March 11, 1933 (US)
- Running time: 89 minutes
- Country: United States
- Language: English
- Budget: $439,000
- Box office: $2.3 million

42nd Street is a 1933 American pre-Code musical film directed by Lloyd Bacon, with songs by Harry Warren (music) and Al Dubin (lyrics). The film's numbers were staged and choreographed by Busby Berkeley. It starred an ensemble cast of Warner Baxter, Bebe Daniels, George Brent, Ruby Keeler, Dick Powell and Ginger Rogers.

Adapted from the 1932 novel of the same name by Bradford Ropes, the film's screenplay was written by Rian James and James Seymour, with uncredited contributions by Whitney Bolton. The story revolves around the cast and crew rehearsing for a Broadway show at the height of the Great Depression.

42nd Street was one of the most successful motion pictures released in 1933, earning almost $1.5 million at the box office. At the 6th Academy Awards, the film was nominated for Best Picture.

In 1998, 42nd Street was selected for preservation in the United States National Film Registry by the Library of Congress as being "culturally, historically, or aesthetically significant".

== Plot ==
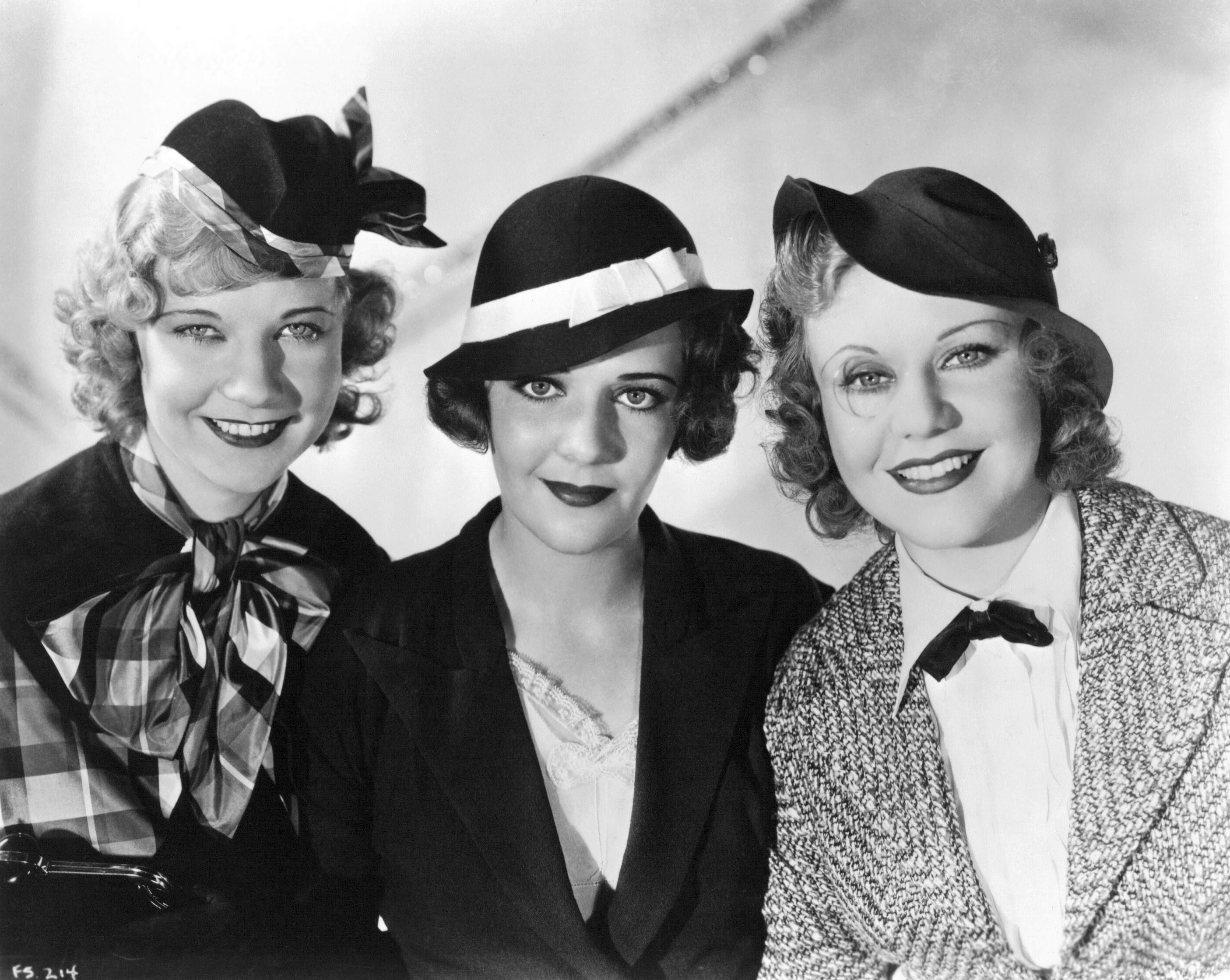
Una Merkel, Ruby Keeler and Ginger Rogers in 42nd Street

In 1932, during the depths of the Great Depression, the noted Broadway producers Jones and Barry are staging Pretty Lady, a musical starring Dorothy Brock. She is involved with wealthy Abner Dillon, the show's financial backer, but she is secretly seeing her old vaudeville partner Pat Denning, who is out of work.

Julian Marsh is hired to direct, although his doctor warns that he risks his life if he continues in his high-pressure profession. Despite a long string of successes, he is impoverished following the 1929 Stock Market Crash, so he must make his last show a hit in order to earn enough money to retire.

Cast selection and rehearsals begin amidst fierce competition. The newcomer Peggy Sawyer is ignored until two experienced chorines, Lorraine Fleming and Ann Lowell, take her under their wing. Lorraine is assured a job because of her relationship with the dance director, Andy Lee, and she ensures that Ann and Peggy are chosen. Peggy is tricked into bursting into the dressing room of the show's juvenile lead, Billy Lawler, who takes an immediate liking to her.

When Marsh learns about Dorothy's relationship with Pat, he sends some thugs led by his gangster friend Slim Murphy to intimidate Pat. Dorothy and Pat agree not to see each other for a while. Pat takes a stock job in Philadelphia.

Rehearsals continue for five weeks, to Marsh's complete dissatisfaction, until the night before the show's surprise opening in Philadelphia, when Dorothy breaks her ankle. By the next morning, Abner has quarreled with her and wants Marsh to replace her with his new girlfriend, Annie. Annie confesses that she cannot carry the show but convinces the director that the inexperienced Peggy can. Julian is desperate and rehearses Peggy mercilessly until an hour before the premiere.

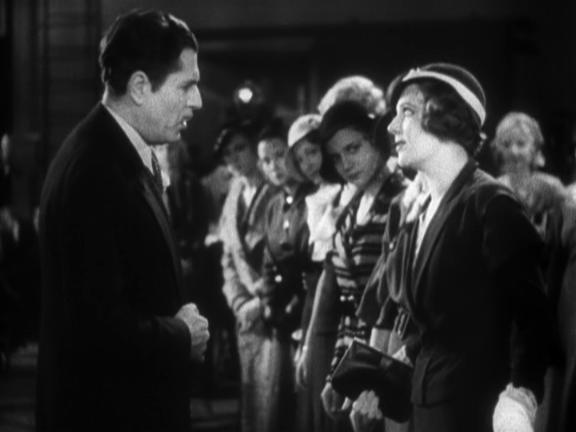
Tough director Julian Marsh (Warner Baxter) and naive newcomer chorus girl Peggy Sawyer (Ruby Keeler).

Billy finally musters the nerve to tell Peggy that he loves her. They embrace and kiss, just as Dorothy appears and walks through the door. She wishes Peggy luck and reveals that she and Pat are finally getting married. The show is staged to rousing applause. As the theater audience leaves, Julian stands in the shadows outside the stage door, hearing comments that Peggy is the star and that he does not deserve the credit for the show's success.

== Cast ==
- Warner Baxter as Julian Marsh
- Bebe Daniels as Dorothy Brock
- George Brent as Pat Denning
- Ruby Keeler as Peggy Sawyer
- Guy Kibbee as Abner Dillon
- Una Merkel as Lorraine Fleming
- Ginger Rogers as Ann Lowell (also known as "Anytime Annie")
- Ned Sparks as Barry
- Dick Powell as Billy Lawler
- Allen Jenkins as MacElroy, the stage manager
- Edward J. Nugent as Terry Neil, a chorus boy
- Robert McWade as Jones
- George E. Stone as Andy Lee, dance director

Uncredited:

- Clarence Nordstrom as leading man in "Shuffle Off to Buffalo"
- Henry B. Walthall as the actor
- Al Dubin as songwriter
- Harry Warren as songwriter
- Toby Wing as blonde in "Young and Healthy"
- Charles Lane as playwright
- Dave O'Brien as chorus boy
- Rolfe Sedan as man on stage
- Jack LaRue as thug
- Tom Kennedy as thug
- Harry Akst as Jerry, rehearsal pianist and conductor
- Louise Beavers as Pansy, Dorothy Brock's maid
- Adele Lacy as a chorus girl

- Source: except where noted

== Production ==
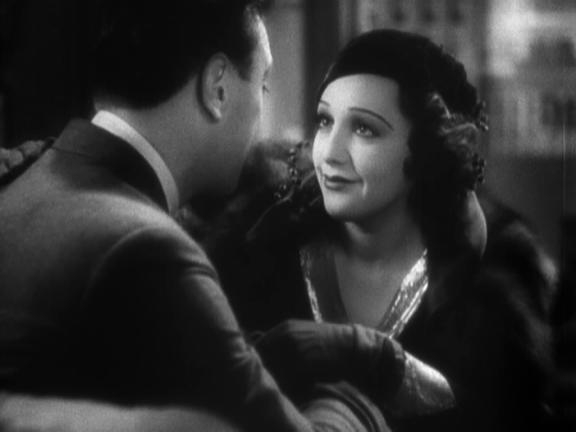
Pat Denning (George Brent) and his old vaudeville partner Dorothy Brock (Bebe Daniels).

The film was Ruby Keeler's first, and the first time that Busby Berkeley, Harry Warren and Al Dubin had worked for Warner Bros. Pictures. Mervyn LeRoy, the original director, became ill and Lloyd Bacon was hired to replace him. LeRoy was dating Ginger Rogers at the time and had suggested that she take the role of Ann.

Actors who were considered for lead roles include Warren William and Richard Barthelmess for the role of Julian Marsh, eventually played by Warner Baxter; Kay Francis and Ruth Chatterton instead of Bebe Daniels for the role of Dorothy Brock; Loretta Young as Peggy Sawyer instead of Ruby Keeler; Joan Blondell instead of Ginger Rogers for Anytime Annie; Glenda Farrell for the role of Lorraine, played by Una Merkel; and Frank McHugh instead of George E. Stone as Andy.

The film began production on October 5, 1932. The shooting schedule ran for 28 days at the Warner Bros. studio in Burbank, California. The total production cost is estimated to have been between $340,000 and $439,000.

== Musical numbers ==
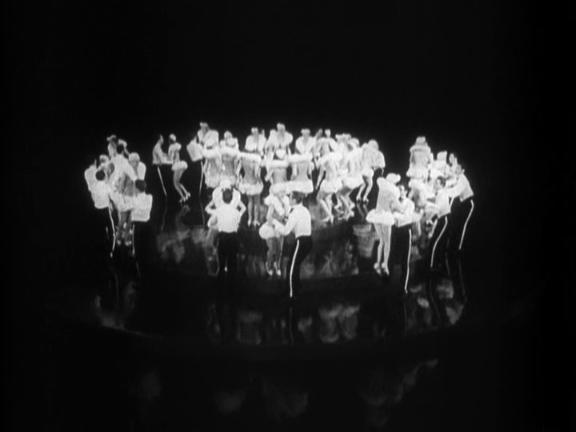
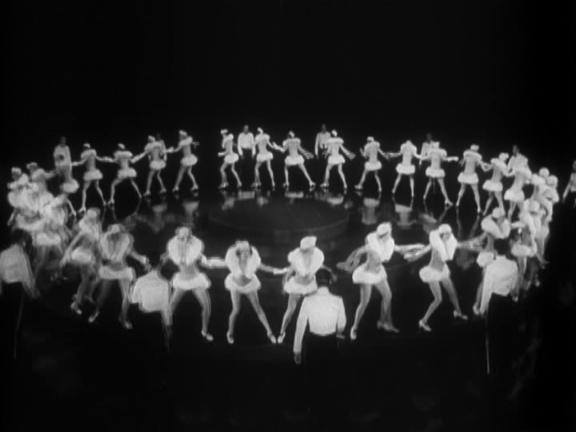

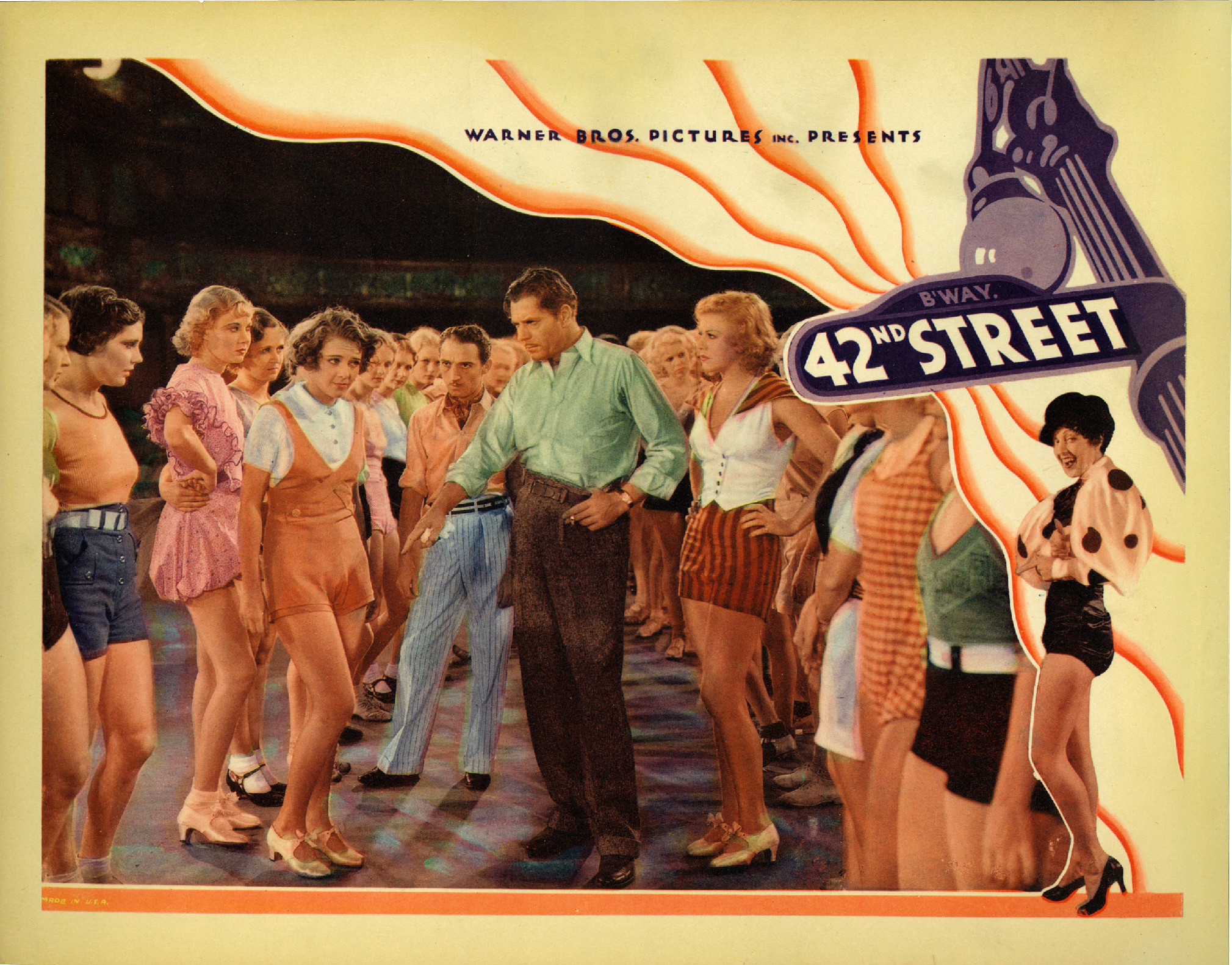
A lobby card for the film.

The film's music was written by Harry Warren with lyrics by Al Dubin. The numbers were choreographed and directed by Busby Berkeley.

- "You're Getting to Be a Habit with Me" – sung by Bebe Daniels
- "It Must Be June" – sung by Bebe Daniels, Dick Powell and the chorus
- "Shuffle Off to Buffalo" – sung and danced by Ruby Keeler and Clarence Nordstrom, with Ginger Rogers, Una Merkel and the chorus
- "Young and Healthy" – sung by Dick Powell to Toby Wing and the chorus
- "42nd Street" – sung and danced by Ruby Keeler, and sung by Dick Powell

The "Love Theme", written by Harry Warren, is played under scenes between Ruby Keeler and Dick Powell, and Bebe Daniels and George Brent. It has no title or lyrics and is unpublished.

The music playing during dance rehearsals and the opening of the show is an instrumental piano piece that Warren wrote titled "Pretty Lady", the name of the show that is produced in the film.

== Release ==
The film premiered in New York on March 9, 1933, at the Strand Theatre and entered general release two days later, becoming one of the most profitable films of the year, earning an estimated gross of $2,300,000. According to Warner Bros. records, the film earned $1,438,000 domestically and $843,000 abroad.

== Reception ==
On the review aggregator website Rotten Tomatoes, the film has a 92% rating based on 26 critics' reviews, with an average rating of 7.90 out of 10. The website's critics' consensus states, "Bubsy Berkeley does it again in 42nd Street, a brilliant depression-era romp with stellar musical numbers and impeccable choreography."

In a contemporary review for The New York Times, critic Mordaunt Hall called 42nd Street "the liveliest and one of the most tuneful screen musical comedies that has come out of Hollywood" and wrote: "Although it has its serious moments, it is for the most part a merry affair ... It is a film which reveals the forward strides made in this particular medium since the first screen musical features came to Broadway. Although it has its boisterous moments, '42nd Street' is invariably entertaining."

The New York World-Telegram described the film as "[a] sprightly entertainment, combining, as it did, a plausible enough story of back-stage life, some excellent musical numbers and dance routines and a cast of players that are considerably above the average found in screen musicals." Variety wrote: "Every element is professional and convincing. It'll socko the screen musical fans with the same degree that Metro's pioneering screen musicals did."

John Mosher of The New Yorker called it "a bright movie" with "as pretty a little fantasy of Broadway as you may hope to see" and praised Baxter's performance as "one of the best he has given us", although he described the plot as "the most conventional one to be found in such doings."

=== Legacy ===
In 1998, 42nd Street was selected for preservation in the United States National Film Registry by the Library of Congress as being "culturally, historically, or aesthetically significant."

In 2006, the film was ranked #13 on the American Film Institute's list of the greatest musicals of all time. A Broadway stage adaptation debuted in 1980, winning two Tony Awards, including Best Musical. It was followed by a successful Broadway revival in 2001 and the show continues to be performed worldwide.

The February 2020 issue of New York Magazine lists 42nd Street as among "The Best Movies That Lost Best Picture at the Oscars."

The film's copyright was renewed in 1960, and it will enter the American public domain on January 1, 2029. (Note: Under R256878)

== Stage adaptation ==
In 1980, the film was adapted into a stage musical by Harry Warren and Al Dubin. It featured additional songs by Warren and lyrics by Dubin and Johnny Mercer and a book by Michael Stewart and Mark Bramble. The original Broadway production directed and choreographed by Gower Champion (whose death on opening night was announced at the curtain call by producer David Merrick) won the Tony Award for Best Musical. Since then, it has been produced regionally and professionally around the world. The score included all musical numbers from the film except "It Must Be June."

== Awards and honors ==
42nd Street received Academy Award nominations for Best Picture and Best Sound and was named one of the ten best films of 1933 by Film Daily.

In 2013 42nd Street was included on the list of films that pass the Bechdel test.

American Film Institute recognition

- 2004 – AFI's 100 Years...100 Songs:
  - "42nd Street", # 97
- 2005 – AFI's 100 Years...100 Movie Quotes:
  - "Sawyer, you're going out a youngster, but you've got to come back a star!", # 87
- 2006 – AFI's Greatest Movie Musicals – # 13

== See also ==
- 42nd Street, the actual street in New York City
