= Cab Calloway's Hi-De-Ho =

1934 American film by Fred Waller

- Directed by: Fred Waller
- Written by: Milton Hockey; Fred Rath
- Produced by: Adolph Zukor
- Starring: Cab Calloway; Fredi Washington
- Cinematography: William Steiner Jr
- Edited by: Bert Frank
- Music by: Cab Calloway and his Orchestra
- Production company: Paramount Pictures
- Distributed by: Paramount Pictures
- Release date: August 24, 1934
- Running time: 10 minutes
- Country: United States
- Language: English

Cab Calloway's Hi-De-Ho (also known as Hi-De-Ho) is an American musical short film directed by Fred Waller and released by Paramount Pictures in 1934. The film stars jazz bandleader Cab Calloway and actress Fredi Washington. In 2001, the film was reissued by Kino International in the DVD collection Hollywood Rhythm: Vol. 1-The Best Of Jazz And Blues.

== Synopsis ==
Bandleader Cab Calloway plays a ladies' man who dates the wife—portrayed by Washington—of a train porter who is frequently absent from home. Calloway and his Orchestra perform "Zaz-zuh-zaz" and "The Lady with the Fan" at the Cotton Club in Harlem, New York.

== Cast ==
- Cab Calloway and his Orchestra
- Fredi Washington

Notable orchestra members in the film include:

- Edwin Swayzee – trumpeter
- Al Morgan – double-bassist
- Eddie Barefield – saxophonist
