= V for Villanova =

Fight song of American university

"V for Villanova, V for Victory" is the fight song of Villanova University. The song was written by Irving R. Leshner under the pen name Les Irving and copyrighted in 1948. Leshner, a local pianist, is known for recording with local band leader Jan Savitt, "The Stokowsky of Swing" on the Victor label in the 1930s. "V for Villanova" is best known for being played by the University's pep band at university events, especially athletic events. Other Villanova songs include "March of the Wildcats" by McKeon, Gill, and Giordano, "The Villanova Anthem" (Alma Mater) by Al Dubin and Joe Burke and "Hail, Villanova", Words by T.J. Spillane, Music by F.A. Schimpf, Jr., and "The Belle Air Waltz", music by Carmen Giordano.

== Lyrics ==
"V" for Villanova, "V" for Victory
"B" for Blue and "W" for White
For the Blue and the White we will fight!
Fight! Fight! Fight!
Fight for Villanova, Fight for Victory
1. For we're out to win the frey;
Villanova leads the way,
With a capital "V" for Victory.
2. For we're out to beat the foe
Show the en-e-my we know
how to win with a "V" for Victory.
Vill-a-no-va
V-I-L-L-A-N-O-V-A
"V" for Vic-tor-y
V-I-C-T-O-R-Y
It's a tooth for a tooth and an eye for an eye,
and a "V" for a
V-I-C-T-O-R-Y
