= When a Man Rides Alone (1933 film) =

1933 film

- Directed by: J.P. McGowan
- Written by: F. McGrew Willis; Oliver Drake
- Starring: Tom Tyler; Adele Lacy; Al Bridge
- Release date: 1933
- Running time: 60 minutes

When a Man Rides Alone is an American pre-Code Western film released in 1933. Tom Tyler stars along with Adele Lacy, and Al Bridge. It was directed by J.P. McGowan.

== Plot ==
A mysterious bandit called the Llano Kid robs stagecoaches but only takes money from Montana Slade's Cottonwood Mine. Striking from behind so he is not seen, the Kid gives the money to those cheated by Slade. Ruth Davis, a new schoolteacher decides to find out who the bandit is.
