= Florence Short =

American actress (1893–1946)

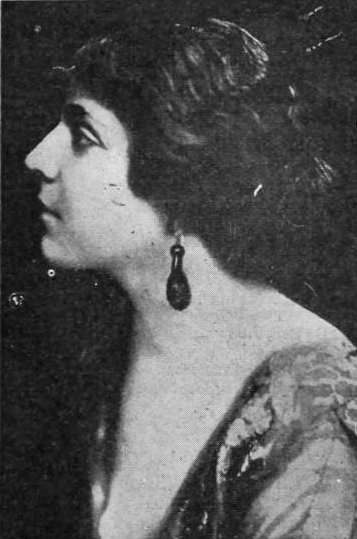
- Born: May 19, 1893; Springfield, Massachusetts, U.S.
- Died: July 10, 1946 (aged 53); Los Angeles, California, U.S.
- Occupation: Actress
- Years active: 1914–1924

Florence Short (May 19, 1893 – July 10, 1946) was an American actress. She had numerous film roles as a supporting actress and was also cast in theatrical productions.

She was born in Springfield, Massachusetts, and moved with her family to New York City as a child, where she attended the Finch School for Girls. She made her professional stage debut in 1910 with the Avenue Stock Company of Wilmington, Delaware. She had early Broadway appearances in Thompson Buchanan's The Bridal Path and George V. Hobart's Experience, and early film roles in Damaged Goods (1914) and The Law That Failed (1917).

She died at her home in Hollywood and is buried in Los Angeles.

== Filmography ==
- Damaged Goods (1914), as Nurse
- Destiny: Or, The Soul of a Woman (1915), as Passion
- The Law That Failed (1917)
- The Outsider (1917), as Mrs. Standish
- The Golden God (1917)
- A Man's World (1918), as Lione Brune
- Pay Day (1918)
- The Eagle's Eye (1918), as Madame Augusta
- Kildare of Storm (1918), as Mahaly
- Five Thousand an Hour (1918), as Polly Parsons
- The Great Victory (1919), as Elaine
- The Love Flower (1920), as Mrs. Bevan
- The Idol Dancer (1920), as Pansy
- Silver Wings (1921), as Widow Martin
- Lessons of Love (1921)
- Woman's Place (1922), as Amy Bleeker
- Cardigan (1922), as Molly Brandt from the Revolutionary War era
- Does It Pay? (1923), as Martha Weston
- The Enchanted Cottage (1924), as Ethel
