= Fred Waller =

American inventor and film pioneer (1886–1954)

- Born: Frederic Waller; 1886; Brooklyn, New York, United States
- Died: May 18, 1954 (aged 67–68); Huntington, New York, United States
- Education: Brooklyn Polytechnic Institute
- Employer(s): Paramount Pictures, Vitarama Corp, Kenyon Instrument Company
- Known for: Inventor of Cinerama; Inventor of the Waller Gunnery Trainer; first to patent the water ski; made 200 short films for Paramount Pictures
- Spouses: Irene Seymour (m. 1905; div. 1919) Grace Waller (m. 1920; her death. 1941) Doris Barber Caron (m. 1942; his death. 1954)
- Children: Stuart, Muriel (both with Irene Seymour)
- Parent(s): Frederic Waller, Katherine Stearns

Frederic Waller (1886 – May 18, 1954) was an American inventor and film pioneer.

== Career ==
Waller is most known for his contributions to film special effects while working at Paramount Pictures, for his creation of the Waller Flexible Gunnery Trainer, and for inventing Cinerama, the immersive experience of a curved film screen that extends to the viewer's peripheral vision, for which he received an Academy Award.

Waller, a snow-skiing and boating enthusiast, is also credited with obtaining the first patent for a water ski in 1925. He produced and directed 200 one-reel shorts for Paramount, including Cab Calloway's Hi-De-Ho (1934) and Duke Ellington's Symphony in Black (1935). He patented several pieces of photographic equipment, including a camera that could take a 360-degree still photo.

As the special projects director for the 1939 New York World's Fair, he collaborated on the fair centerpiece attraction called the Perisphere, the Eastman Kodak Hall of Color, and he developed the Time and Space Building to showcase his creation, Vitarama an 11-projector system projecting onto a half-dome sphere and precursor to Cinerama. During World War II, the Vitarama Corporation (and Fred Waller) produced a five-projector aerial gunnery trainer used by the armed forces. It saved an estimated 350,000 casualties during the war.

== Patents ==
- U.S. patent 1,559,390: Aquaplane (filed August 22, 1925, issued October 27, 1925)
- U.S. patent 2,125,365: Anemometer (filed December 29, 1936, issued August 2, 1938)
- U.S. patent 2,164,791: Apparatus for taking sounds (filed May 29, 1937, issued July 4, 1939)
- U.S. patent 2,273,074: Screen for picture projection (filed June 14, 1938, issued February 17, 1942)
- U.S. patent 2,445,982: Gunnery training apparatus (filed May 20, 1944, issued July 27, 1948)
- U.S. patent 2,470,592: Control band for gunnery training apparatus (filed May 20, 1944, issued May 17, 1949)
- U.S. patent 2,454,238: Electrically illuminated display apparatus (filed July 26, 1944, issued Nov 16, 1948)
- U.S. patent 2,487,620: Desiccator (filed March 8, 1946, issued November 8, 1949)
- U.S. patent 2,503,083: Apparatus for controlling picture displays from sound records (filed February 15, 1947, issued April 4, 1950)
- U.S. patent 2,476,521: Screen for picture projections (filed September 22, 1947, issued July 19, 1949)
- U.S. patent 2,664,780: Method of photographically correcting the photographic images of objects (filed February 4, 1948, issued January 5, 1954)
- U.S. patent 2,583,030: Parallax correction for multilens cameras (filed October 9, 1948, issued January 22, 1952)
- U.S. patent 2,563,893: Apparatus for holding and guiding a chain of slides for successive display (filed November 17, 1948, issued August 14, 1951)
- U.S. patent 2,682,722: Linked holder for lantern slides (filed December 4, 1948, issued July 6, 1954)
- U.S. patent 2,664,781: Photographic apparatus for correcting negatives during printing thereof (filed September 30, 1949, issued January 5, 1954)
- U.S. patent 2,705,439: Slide projector with sloping magazine and slide carrier for withdrawing the lowermost slide from the magazine (filed February 20, 1951, issued April 5, 1955)

== Awards ==
- Society of Motion Picture & Television Engineers Progress Medal (1953)
- Academy of Motion Picture Arts and Sciences Scientific or Technical Award (1954)
