= Alma Hanlon =

American actress (1890-1977)

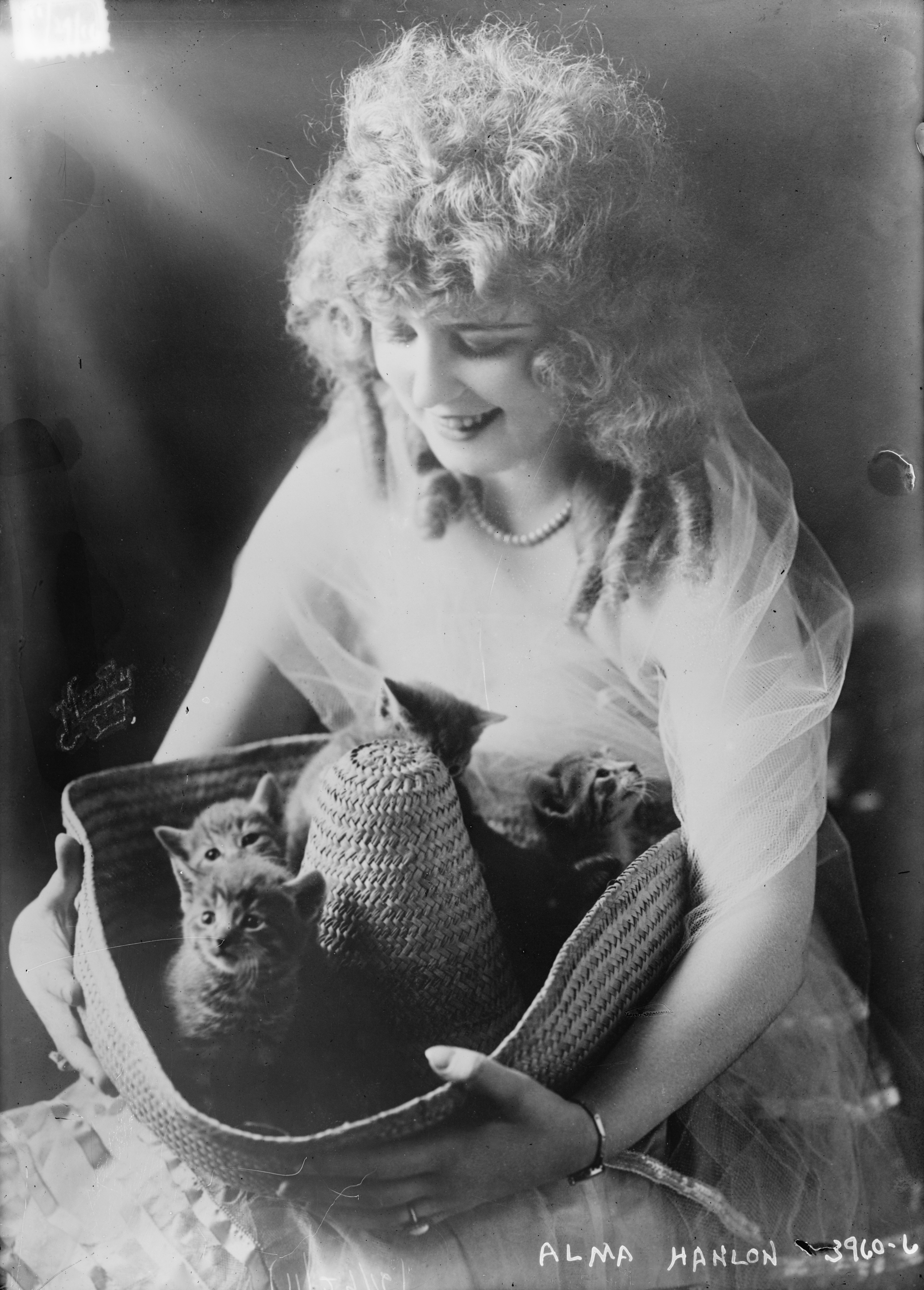
- Born: April 30, 1890; New Jersey, US
- Died: October 26, 1977 (aged 87); Monterey, California, US
- Years active: 1915–1919
- Spouse(s): Walter J. Kingsley (1905–1917); Louis Myll (1918–?)
- Children: Dorothy Kingsley

Alma Hanlon (April 30, 1890 – October 26, 1977) was an American silent film actress. Hanlon's film career was short, lasting only four years. She appeared in twenty-three films. Her first film role was as Dorothy Dare in The Fixer (1915) and her last was in The Profiteer (1919).

== Early years ==
She was born on April 30, 1890, in New Jersey, the youngest daughter of George Hanlon. Her mother, Helena Reynolds Hanlon, was the leading lady at the Gaiety Theatre in London. Two of her brothers formed the Hanlon Brothers pantomime team, one was an actor in London, and one was a stage director and producer.

== Career ==
In 1915 Hanlon was under contract to George Kleine and making films that the Kleine-Edison picture company released. Her film debut came in Keleine's The Fixer.

== Personal life and death ==
Her first husband was former correspondent and theatrical press agent Walter J. Kingsley in 1905 They had one child, Dorothy Kingsley and divorced in 1917.

In 1918 she married director Louis Myll, when she had been living at Bayside, Queens for the last two years. She later moved with her daughter to the affluent suburb of Grosse Pointe, Michigan, and retired.

She died on October 26, 1977, in Monterey, California.

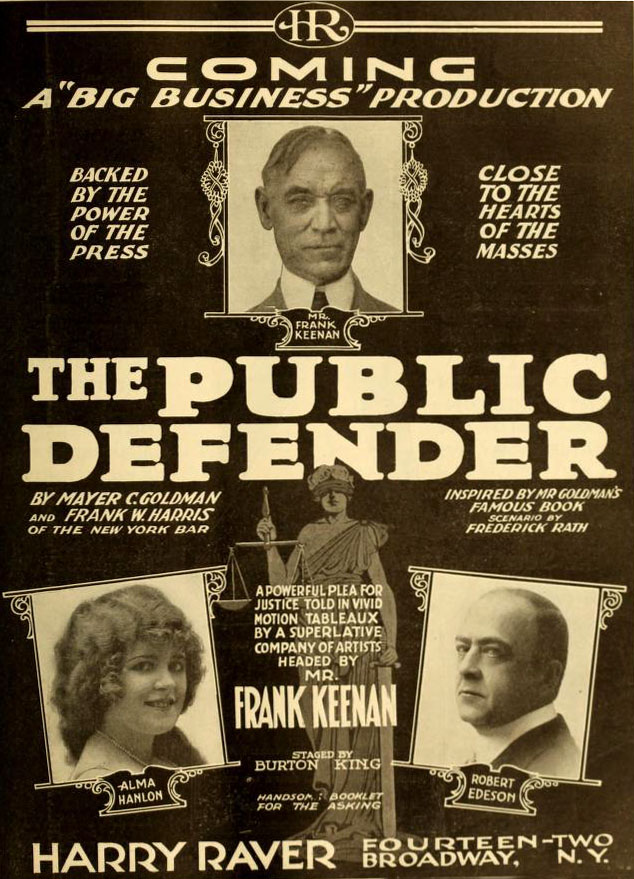

== Partial filmography ==
- Keep Moving (1915)
- The Fixer (1915)
- The Weakness of Man (1916)
- Gold and the Woman (1916)
- The Whip (1917)
- The Golden God (1917)
- Public Defender (1917)
- The Profiteer (1919)
