= Hello Sister (1930 film) =

1930 film

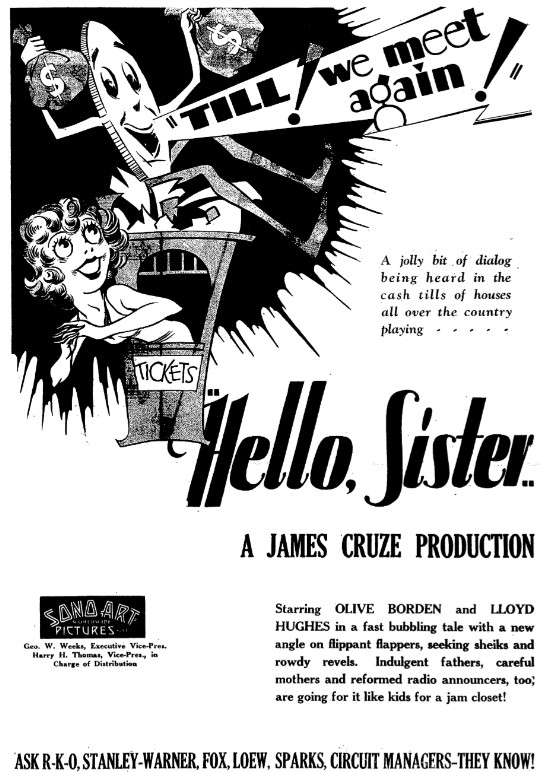
- Advertisement
- Directed by: Walter Lang
- Written by: Reita Lambert; Brian Marlow
- Starring: Olive Borden
- Production company: James Cruze Productions
- Distributed by: Sono Art-World Wide Pictures
- Release date: February 15, 1930
- Running time: 80 minutes
- Country: United States
- Language: English

Hello Sister is a 1930 American Pre-Code drama film directed by Walter Lang.

== Cast ==
- Olive Borden as Vee Newell
- Lloyd Hughes as Marshall Jones
- George Fawcett as Fraser Newell
- Bodil Rosing as Martha Peddie
- Norman Peck as 'Tivvie' Rose
- Howard C. Hickman as John Stanley (as Howard Hickman)
- Raymond Keane as Randall Carr
- Wilfred Lucas as Dr. Saltus

== Censorship ==
An article critical of the inconsistent censorship of films by the Toronto censor board noted many "innocent" sections were being cut. Among several eliminations ordered for Hello Sister was a scene in a church where the minister was announcing the hymn to be sung by the congregation.
