= Francisco Herrera (baseball) =

Los Angeles Dodgers clubhouse attendant

"Chico" Herrera
- Born: Francisco Herrera; Los Angeles, California, US

Francisco "Chico" Herrera is a clubhouse attendant for the Los Angeles Dodgers. He became a media sensation after he was put in to play on the field in the team's 2020 intrasquad preseason scrimmages.

== Amateur career ==
Herrera is a native of Hollywood, California. He attended Hollywood High School, where he played baseball. His high school coach stated that he could have played on a Division I college team, but his inner-city school was never scouted. He was noted as a good fielder, playing the shortstop position, and hit for high average—over .300 every year of high school, including an over-.500 senior-year batting average. He was also a good base stealer. Herrera next attended Los Angeles Valley College, where he was the starting shortstop for the baseball team from 2009 to 2010.

== Dodgers organization ==
Herrera first joined the Dodgers organization as a part-time clubhouse attendant in 2008, at the age of 18. He has also filled the role of ball boy and bat boy for the team. As a ball boy, Herrera was often noticed for his sideline catches in games. His team responsibilities also included shagging balls in the outfield during batting practice, and playing catch to warm up the team's pitchers.

In 2012, Herrera garnered media attention when, after several years as an employee, he was invited to an open tryout for the Dodgers. One pitcher he caught for, Jon Garland, had noted his strong arm in 2011 and persuaded De Jon Watson, the Dodgers' assistant general manager for player development, to allow Herrera to try out. Herrera participated in the open tryout in Glendale, Arizona, on March 2, 2012. After the tryout, Herrera was ultimately not offered a player's contract by the team, but returned to his regular staff duties. Watson complimented Herrera's speed and arm, but felt his hitting needed more work.

== "Don't run on Chico" ==
In 2020, before the start of the COVID-19 pandemic-shortened Major League Baseball season, teams played intrasquad scrimmage games to get into playing shape before the first preseason exhibition games. With the Dodgers attempting to limit the number of players needed to field two squads, Herrera was asked to step in as left fielder and occasional pinch runner, nearly a decade since his last involvement in competitive play.

Herrera made his scrimmage debut on July 8, 2020. He played with a jersey numbered 97, with "Francisco" across the back. He initially misplayed his first fielding attempt, allowing the batter to reach third base. However, a series of subsequent fielding plays caught the attention of players and broadcasters, and earned him praise on social media and in sports media. In a play in his first game, Herrera caught a fly ball and held a tagging runner at third with a strong throw home, preventing a run from scoring. In another play on July 11, Herrera initiated a double play by catching a fly ball deep in left field, and then throwing out Chris Taylor at second base, who was attempting to tag up.

The night after the play on Taylor, Dodgers manager Dave Roberts announced it would be Herrera's last game, as the team was in need of getting more players into extended game time and had less need for a fill-in. The next night's starting pitcher, Ross Stripling, tweeted that he was lobbying for Herrera to keep playing. Herrera continued making subsequent appearances despite Roberts' earlier statement. On July 14, Herrera was back in the outfield, and taking the place of demoted minor leaguer Anthony García. In that game, Herrera made an even more impressive fielding play, with a running overhead catch of a deep Mookie Betts fly ball to the warning track, after which he turned and threw back to the cutoff man, who threw out the runner at first base.

As a result of Herrera's strong throws, many commentators began using the phrase "Don't Run on Chico" and the hashtag #DontRunOnChico, and his highlights were shared widely. He received supportive tweets from Dodgers players, such as Stripling and Justin Turner, and his highlights were shared on the official Dodgers Twitter account with the hashtag, and in their mlb.com reports.

Herrera was profiled in the Los Angeles Times, Sports Illustrated, and The Athletic, and interviewed in a segment for MLB Network's Intentional Talk. Coverage of Herrera cast him as a "heartwarming story" of an "unlikely hero" during a time of otherwise mostly bad news in the world, amid the global COVID-19 pandemic and cancellation of professional sports. Many Dodgers players were supportive of the attention Herrera received, and even pushed for him to continue being given playing time. While he never received an at-bat, many on social media called for Herrera to be given a chance to hit, and Turner wore a shirt to practice printed with the hashtag #LetChicoHit.
