= Fred Rath (writer) =

American writer

Frederick William Rath (March 3, 1874 – August 7, 1954) was an American playwright and screenwriter.

Rath was born in New York.

He died in Monroe, New York.

== Theater ==
- Solitaire (March 1929), writer
- Melodrama (1929), a play about Sing Sing
- First Night (1930–1931), writer
- Her Tin Soldier (1933), wrote and produced
- Bigger Than Barnum (1946), co-wrote with Lee Sands

== Films ==
- Behind the Mask (1917)
- The Mystic Hour (1917)
- The Golden God (1917)
- When You and I Were Young (1917)
- Public Defender (1917)
- Cab Calloway's Hi-De-Ho (1934)
- Cab Calloway's Jitterbug Party (1935), written by Milton Hockey and Fred Rath
- Symphony in Black (1935)
- Give Out, Sisters (1941), original story
- Sing a Jingle (1944) screenplay
