= Chlo-e (Song of the Swamp) =

1927 show tune with music by Charles N. Daniels

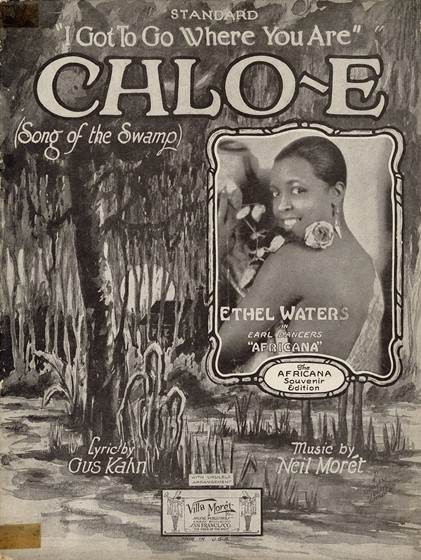
Sheet music cover featuring Ethel Waters, 1927

"Chlo-e (Song of the Swamp)" (1927) is a show tune with music by Charles N. Daniels, writing under the pseudonym of "Neil Morét," and lyrics by Gus Kahn. It is now regarded as a jazz standard.

== Origin ==
The sheet music of "Chlo-e (Song of the Swamp)" bears the front cover image of singer Ethel Waters and connects it to the show Africana. This marked the Broadway debut of Waters, and began her rise to stardom. Produced by Earl Dancer and principally written by Donald Heywood, the show opened on July 11, 1927. "Chloe"—to which the title is frequently, and usefully, modified, and is used hereafter—may have been placed in this revue as a later addition to the production. Waters' never recorded Chloe, and it is not listed among the known songs that she sang in Africana. The sheet music was first published in 1927 by Charles N. Daniels' own Villa Morét imprint, based in San Francisco.

In 1934, Heywood re-fashioned Africana into an operetta, but it did not include "Chloe" or any other external number. It closed after just three performances.

== Content ==
"Chloe" tells a story. The verse is sung by an omniscient narrator, describing the struggle of a lonely character, conducting a long and determined search for "Chloe" in the "dismal swampland." The searcher then picks up the chorus, with its hook of "I Got to go where you are," declaring that "If you live, I'll find you."

The score is marked "In a tragic way" and while—owing to its narrative opening—it is not necessarily gender-specific, its range and melodic line suggests that it was designed for low voice. Women have sung it also, including Dinah Shore, Valaida Snow, The Ingenues and Eva Taylor, who recorded the first female vocal version for Okeh in 1928, followed closely by Bessie Brown for Brunswick. While its topic hearkens back to the milieu of minstrel-type material, the music is uncharacteristically rich, dark hued, expressive and atypical of the Jazz Age, looking forward to the more muted and reflective sound of Depression-era songwriting.

== Recordings ==
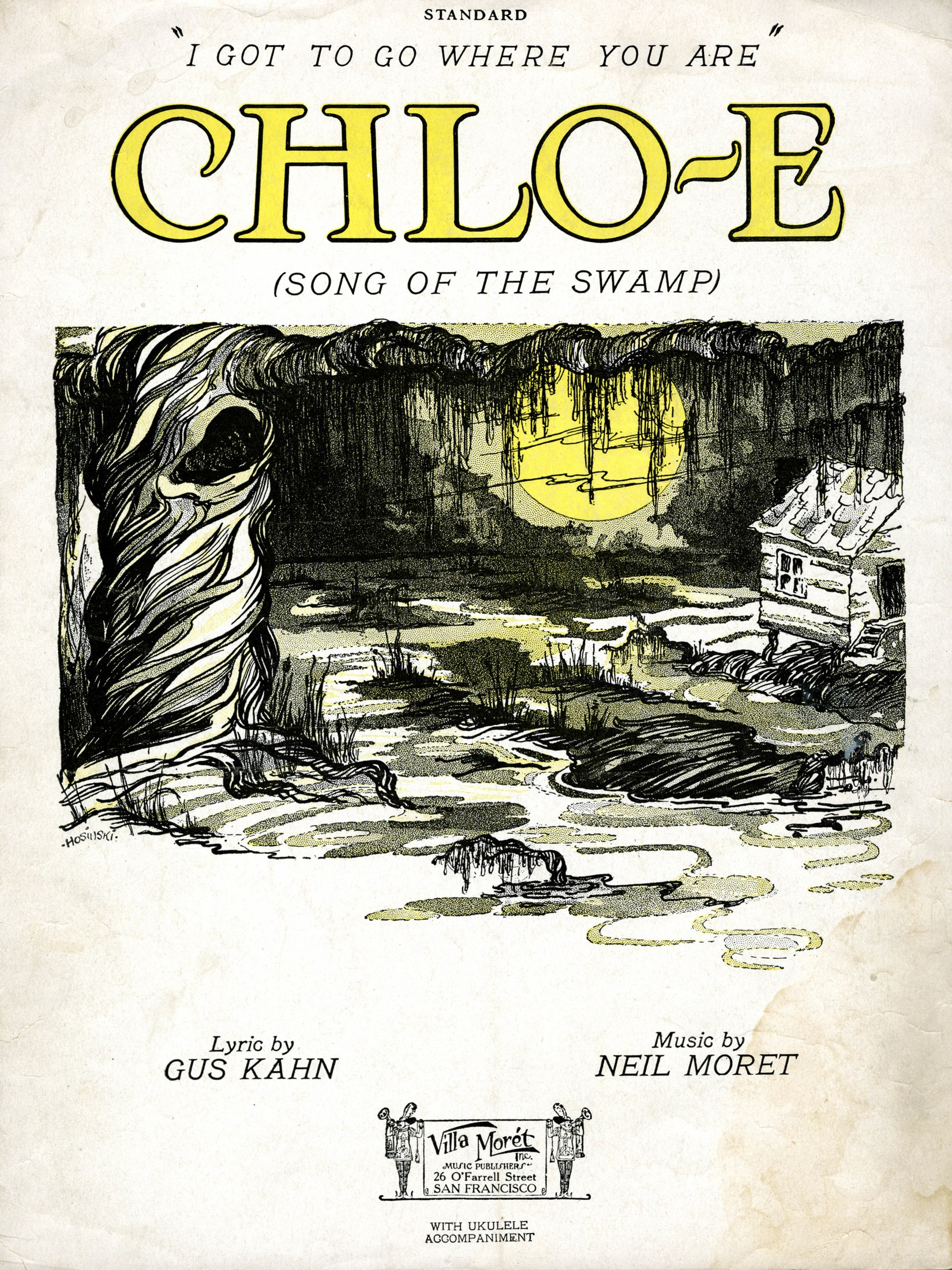
Alternate sheet music cover, 1927

The first recording of "Chloe" was made for Columbia in Los Angeles in September 1927 by singer Douglas Richardson, a vocalist with ties to Charles N. Daniels; it was followed by another Columbia by The Singing Sophomores made in November. Blues singer Eva Taylor recorded a version on June 2nd, 1928 for Okeh Records. The first instrumental recording of "Chloe" was made by the All-Star Orchestra for Victor, with a vocal chorus by Franklyn Baur, in December 1927. This is identified in the Victor ledgers as "the Fud and Farley Orchestra, directed by Nat Shilkret," indicating the probable participation of Fud Livingston and Max Farley. Shilkret recorded another arrangement of it for Victor with his Rhyth-Melodists in March 1928.

However, the record that appears to have popularized "Chloe" is an elaborate version by the Paul Whiteman Concert Orchestra recorded in 1928 with vocals by Austin Young. This arrived along with a host of other 1928 recordings of the song. These include Bob Haring, as the "Colonial Club Orchestra" and Louis Katzman for Brunswick, and a vocal version for Victor featuring the vocal group The Rounders, recorded in Oakland, California. The Tracy-Brown Orchestra of Chicago recorded it for Columbia in March 1928 with a vocal by Sam Coslow; Coslow also recorded a test of the piece for Victor that year, but it didn't pass. Seger Ellis recorded it in a vocal rendition for Okeh that was the first made by a crooner; Sam Lanin recorded it for Okeh in January under the name of The Gotham Troubadours. Among budget labels, Plaza Records' Hollywood Dance Orchestra, led by Adrian Schubert and with a vocal by Leroy Montesanto, recorded it in January, and Cameo/Pathé waxed it as by the Goodrich Broadcasters—possibly Sam Lanin again—in February.

The most famous recording of "Chloe" is a parody version by Spike Jones and his City Slickers, featuring a vocal by Red Ingle and recorded for RCA Victor in 1945. Another humorous version was cut by diseuse Leona Anderson in 1957 for her LP Music to Suffer By. Among serious recordings, instrumental versions far outdistance the vocal ones. The most respected instrumental version is the 1940 recording by Duke Ellington's Famous Orchestra, with a "wah-wah" intro by trombonist Tricky Sam Nanton, featuring Cootie Williams on trumpet alternating with bassist Jimmy Blanton and a solo by Ben Webster; Billy Strayhorn's arrangement makes a radical overhaul of Daniels' harmony, and places the verse after the chorus. This chart also appears on the famous live recording made of the Ellington Orchestra in Fargo, North Dakota in December 1940.

Among other notable pre-war instrumental versions of "Chloe" is Benny Goodman's from 1937, Art Tatum's piano solo from 1938 and those by Tommy Dorsey and John Kirby (musician), both from 1940. After the war, it was recorded by jazz artists such as Herbie Harper, Don Byas, Eddie Bert, Frank Rosolino, Jimmy Rowles, Jerry Jerome, Herbie Harper, Nat Adderley, Cal Tjader, Charlie Mariano, Shelly Manne, Arne Domnerus, Paul Horn, Al Cohn, Bob Wilber (at least twice), Bill Doggett, Flip Phillips and Eddie Heywood. George Melachrino arranged it for string orchestra; Bunk Johnson—in his last session in 1948—recorded it in a traditional jazz setting, and Ry Cooder has performed it as a guitar solo. Non-jazz oriented recordings of "Chloe" were made by the Everly Brothers in 1961, by guitarist Mickey Baker in 1962 and by Anton LaVey on keyboards and Nick Bougas on vocals in 1995.

The most well-known vocal version is that by Louis Armstrong, who did not record the piece until 1952; it was also sung on record by Henry "Red" Allen, for ARC in 1936. Ray Conniff included it with a chorus on his 1965 LP Love Affair.

The song has been traditionally popular with organists, many of whom have fashioned elaborate arrangements of it. Memorable renditions have been recorded by Don Baker, Eddie Dunstedter and George Wright.

== Film and television ==
Although it was seldom recorded in the early part of the 1930s, "Chloe" was heard constantly on radio during this period, as it fit in with the general mood of the times. Its popularity led to a loose horror film adaptation based on the song directed by Marshall Neilan entitled Chloe, Love Is Calling You (1934) filmed in the Everglades and starring Olive Borden. Produced by short-lived poverty row studio Pinnacle Productions, it was targeted to African-American audiences, but was unsuccessful.

A 1929 short made in Britain by the early sound company Electrocord also likely was a performance of the song, but it is unclear as to by whom. Probably as a nod to the song, Chloe is the name of the "Jekyll and Hyde"-type monster in Norm McCabe's Daffy Duck cartoon The Impatient Patient (1942) who lives in a swamp.

Singer Vera Van performs a lovely and romantic version, without the introductory verse, in the Vitaphone short, "Mirrors" featuring Freddie Rich and his Orchestra. The film was released on September 8, 1934.

In an early episode of the 1951–1953 CBS-TV version of Amos 'n' Andy known as The Amos 'n' Andy Show, actress singer Lillian Randolph portraying Andy's estranged ex-fiancée, Madame Queen, wins a television contest for her rendition of "Chloe".

== Other songs named "Chloe" ==
"Chloe" is not to be confused with Al Jolson and Buddy DeSylva's song "Chloe", written for the show Sinbad in 1918 and recorded by Jolson in 1920, nor an Elton John song by that title included on his 1981 album The Fox.
