= Duke Ellington =

American jazz pianist and composer (1899–1974)

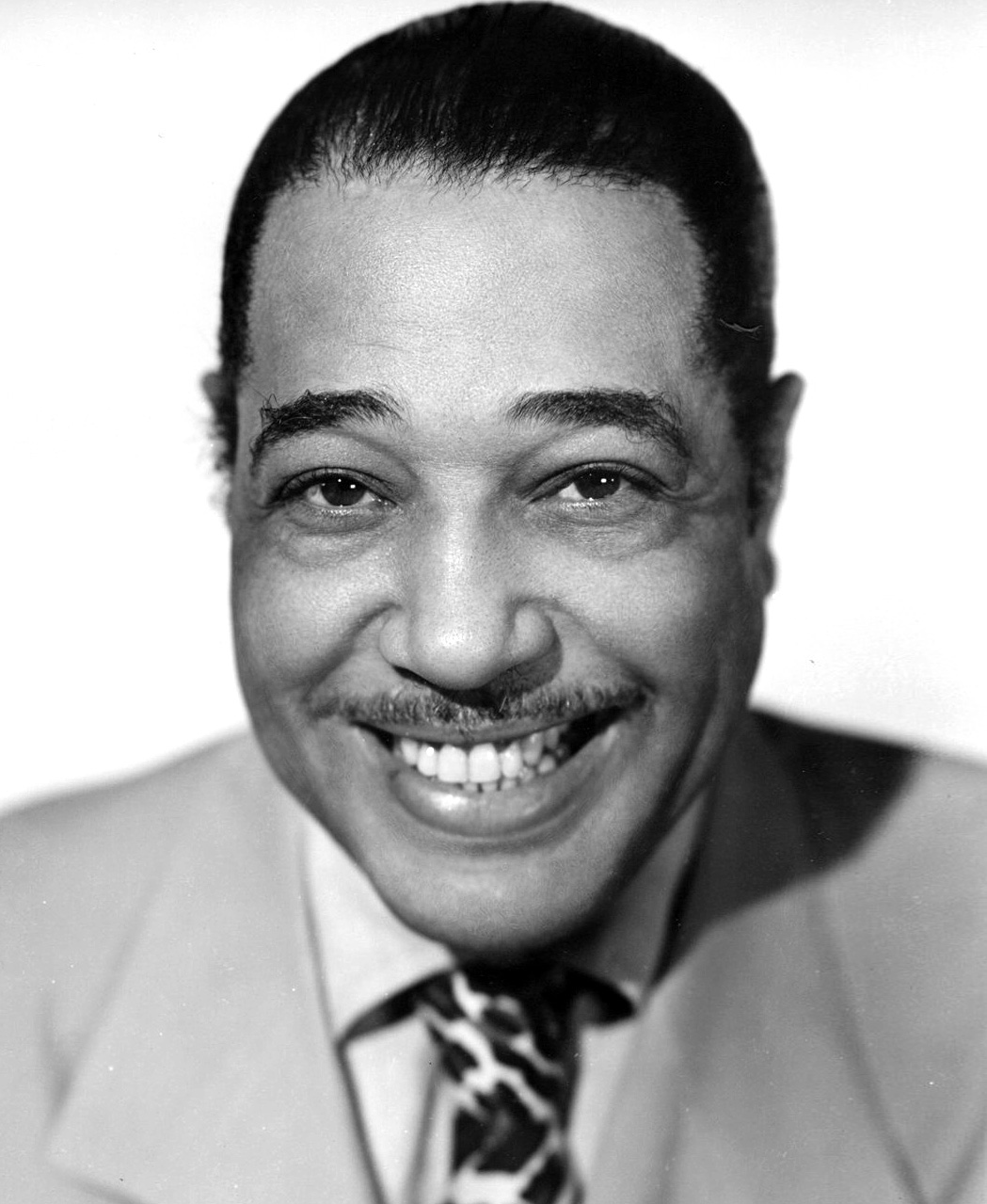
- Publicity portrait of Ellington, c. 1940s
- Born: Edward Kennedy Ellington; April 29, 1899; Washington, D.C., U.S.
- Died: May 24, 1974 (aged 75); New York City, U.S.
- Burial place: Woodlawn Cemetery, Bronx
- Occupations: Pianist; composer; songwriter; bandleader; arranger; conductor; actor
- Years active: 1914–1974
- Spouse: Edna Thompson (m. 1918; sep. 1929)
- Partner: Mildred Dixon
- Children: Mercer Ellington
- Relatives: Steve Ellington
- Musical career
- Genres: Jazz; swing; orchestral jazz; third stream
- Works: Discography
- Website: dukeellington.com

Edward Kennedy "Duke" Ellington (April 29, 1899 – May 24, 1974) was an American jazz pianist, composer, and leader of his eponymous jazz orchestra from 1924 through the rest of his life. Music critic Ralph J. Gleason called him "America's most important composer".

Born and raised in Washington, D.C., Ellington was based in New York City from the mid-1920s and gained a national profile through his orchestra's appearances at the Cotton Club in Harlem. A master at writing miniatures for the three-minute 78 rpm recording format, Ellington wrote or collaborated on more than one thousand compositions; his extensive body of work is the largest recorded personal jazz legacy, and many of his pieces have become standards. He also recorded songs written by his bandsmen, such as Juan Tizol's "Caravan", which brought a Spanish tinge to big band jazz.

At the end of the 1930s, Ellington began a nearly thirty-year collaboration with composer-arranger-pianist Billy Strayhorn, whom he called his writing and arranging companion. With Strayhorn, he composed multiple extended compositions, or suites, as well as many short pieces. For a few years at the beginning of Strayhorn's involvement, Ellington's orchestra featured bassist Jimmy Blanton and tenor saxophonist Ben Webster, and reached what many claim to be a creative peak for the group. Some years later, following a low-profile period, an appearance by Ellington and his orchestra at the Newport Jazz Festival in July 1956 led to a major revival and regular world tours. Ellington recorded for most American record companies of his era, performed in and scored several films, and composed a handful of stage musicals.

Although a pivotal figure in the history of jazz, in the opinion of Gunther Schuller and Barry Kernfeld, "the most significant composer of the genre", Ellington himself embraced the phrase "beyond category", considering it a liberating principle, and referring to his music as part of the more general category of American music. Ellington was known for his inventive use of the orchestra, or big band, as well as for his eloquence and charisma. He was awarded a posthumous Pulitzer Prize Special Award for music in 1999.

== Early life and education ==
Ellington was born on April 29, 1899, to James Edward Ellington and Daisy (née Kennedy) Ellington in Washington, D.C. Both of his parents were pianists. Daisy primarily played parlor songs and James preferred operatic arias. They lived with Daisy's parents at 2129 Ida Place (now Ward Place) NW, in D.C.'s West End neighborhood. Duke's father was born in Lincolnton, North Carolina, on April 15, 1879, and in 1886, moved to D.C. with his parents. Daisy Kennedy was born in Washington, D.C., on January 4, 1879, the daughter of two former American slaves. James Ellington made blueprints for the United States Navy.

When Ellington was a child, his family showed racial pride and support in their home, as did many other families. African Americans in D.C. worked to protect their children from the era's Jim Crow laws.

At the age of seven, Ellington began taking piano lessons from Marietta Clinkscales. Daisy surrounded her son with dignified women to reinforce his manners and teach him elegance. His childhood friends noticed that his casual, offhand manner and dapper dress gave him the bearing of a young nobleman, so they began calling him "Duke". Ellington credited his friend Edgar McEntee for the nickname: "I think he felt that in order for me to be eligible for his constant companionship, I should have a title. So he called me Duke."

Though Ellington took piano lessons, he was more interested in baseball. "President [Theodore] Roosevelt would come on his horse sometimes, and "stop and watch us play", he recalled. Ellington went to Armstrong Technical High School in Washington, D.C. His first job was selling peanuts at Washington Senators baseball games.

Ellington started sneaking into Frank Holiday's Poolroom at the age of fourteen. Hearing the music of the poolroom pianists ignited Ellington's love for the instrument, and he began to take his piano studies seriously. Among the many piano players he listened to were Doc Perry, Lester Dishman, Louis Brown, Turner Layton, Gertie Wells, Clarence Bowser, Sticky Mack, Blind Johnny, Cliff Jackson, Claude Hopkins, Phil Wurd, Caroline Thornton, Luckey Roberts, Eubie Blake, Joe Rochester, and Harvey Brooks.

In the summer of 1914, while working as a soda jerk at the Poodle Dog Café, Ellington wrote his first composition, "Soda Fountain Rag" (also known as the "Poodle Dog Rag"). He created the piece by ear, as he had not yet learned to read and write music. "I would play the 'Soda Fountain Rag' as a one-step, two-step, waltz, tango, and fox trot", Ellington recalled. "Listeners never knew it was the same piece. I was established as having my own repertoire." In his autobiography, Music is my Mistress (1973), Ellington wrote that he missed more lessons than he attended, feeling at the time that piano was not his talent.

Ellington continued listening to, watching, and imitating ragtime pianists, not only in Washington, D.C., but also in Philadelphia and Atlantic City, where he vacationed with his mother during the summer. He would sometimes hear strange music played by those who could not afford much sheet music, so for variations, they played the sheets upside down. Henry Lee Grant, a Dunbar High School music teacher, gave him private lessons in harmony. With the additional guidance of Washington pianist and bandleader Oliver "Doc" Perry, Ellington learned to read sheet music, project a professional style, and improve his technique. Ellington was also inspired by his first encounters with stride pianists James P. Johnson and Luckey Roberts. Later, in New York, he took advice from Will Marion Cook, Fats Waller, and Sidney Bechet. He began to play gigs in cafés and clubs in and around Washington, D.C. His attachment to music was so strong that in 1916 he turned down an art scholarship to the Pratt Institute in Brooklyn. Three months before graduating, he dropped out of Armstrong Manual Training School, where he was studying commercial art.

== Career ==
=== Early career ===
Working as a freelance sign painter from 1917, Ellington began assembling groups to play for dances. In 1919, he met drummer Sonny Greer from New Jersey, who encouraged Ellington's ambition to become a professional musician. Ellington built his music business through his day job. When a customer asked him to make a sign for a dance or party, he would ask if they had musical entertainment; if not, Ellington would offer to play for the occasion. He also had a messenger job with the U.S. Navy and State departments, where he made a wide range of contacts.

Ellington moved out of his parents' home and bought his own as he became a successful pianist. At first, he played in other ensembles, and in late 1917 formed his first group, "The Duke's Serenaders" ("Colored Syncopators", his telephone directory advertising proclaimed). He was also the group's booking agent. His first play date was at the True Reformer's Hall, where he took home 75 cents.

Ellington played throughout the D.C. area and into Virginia for private society balls and embassy parties. The band included childhood friend Otto Hardwick, who began playing the string bass, then moved to C-melody saxophone, and finally settled on alto saxophone; Arthur Whetsel on trumpet; Elmer Snowden on banjo; and Sonny Greer on drums. The band thrived, performing for both African-American and white audiences, rare in the segregated society of the day.

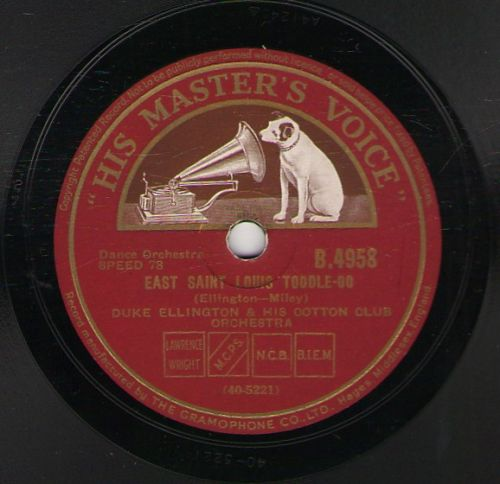
British pressing of "East St. Louis Toodle-Oo" (1927)

When his drummer Sonny Greer was invited to join the Wilbur Sweatman Orchestra in New York City, Ellington left his successful career in D.C. and moved to Harlem, ultimately becoming part of the Harlem Renaissance. New dance crazes such as the Charleston emerged in Harlem, as well as African-American musical theater, including Eubie Blake's and Noble Sissle's (the latter of whom was his neighbor) Shuffle Along. After the young musicians left the Sweatman Orchestra to strike out on their own, they found an emerging jazz scene that was highly competitive with difficult inroad. They hustled pool by day and played whatever gigs they could find. The young band met stride pianist Willie "the Lion" Smith, who introduced them to the scene and gave them some money. They played at rent-house parties for income. After a few months, the young musicians returned to Washington, D.C., feeling discouraged.

In June 1923, they played a gig in Atlantic City, New Jersey, and another at the prestigious Exclusive Club in Harlem. This was followed in September 1923 by a move to the Hollywood Club (at 49th and Broadway) and a four-year engagement, which gave Ellington a solid artistic base. He was known to play the bugle at the end of each performance. The group was initially called "Elmer Snowden and his Black Sox Orchestra" and had seven members, including trumpeter James "Bubber" Miley. They renamed themselves The Washingtonians. Snowden left the group in early 1924, and Ellington took over as bandleader. After a fire, the club was re-opened as the Club Kentucky (often referred to as the Kentucky Club).

Ellington then made eight records in 1924, receiving composing credit on three including "Choo Choo". In 1925, Ellington contributed four songs to Chocolate Kiddies, starring Lottie Gee and Adelaide Hall, an all–African-American revue which introduced European audiences to African-American styles and performers. Duke Ellington and his Kentucky Club Orchestra grew to a group of ten players; they developed their own sound via the non-traditional expression of Ellington's arrangements, the street rhythms of Harlem, and the exotic-sounding trombone growls and wah-wahs, high-squealing trumpets, and saxophone blues licks of the band members. For a short time, soprano saxophonist and clarinetist Sidney Bechet played with them, reportedly becoming the dominant personality in the group, with Sonny Greer saying that Bechet "fitted out the band like a glove". His presence resulted in friction with Miley and trombonist Charlie Irvis, whose styles differed from Bechet's New Orleans–influenced playing. It was mainly Bechet's unreliability—he was absent for three days in succession—which made his association with Ellington short-lived.

=== Cotton Club engagement ===
In October 1926, Ellington made an agreement with agent-publisher Irving Mills, giving Mills a 45% interest in Ellington's future. Mills had an eye for new talent and published compositions by Hoagy Carmichael, Dorothy Fields, and Harold Arlen early in their careers. After recording a handful of acoustic sides during 1924–26, Ellington's signing with Mills allowed him to record prolifically. However, sometimes he recorded different versions of the same tune. Mills regularly took a co-composer credit. From the beginning of their relationship, Mills arranged recording sessions on nearly every label, including Brunswick, Victor, Columbia, OKeh, Pathé (and its subsidiary, Perfect), the ARC/Plaza group of labels (Oriole, Domino, Jewel, Banner) and their dime-store labels (Cameo, Lincoln, Romeo), Hit of the Week, and Columbia's cheaper labels (Harmony, Diva, Velvet Tone, Clarion), labels that gave Ellington popular recognition. On OKeh, his records were usually issued as "The Harlem Footwarmers". In contrast, the Brunswicks were usually issued as "The Jungle Band". "Whoopee Makers" and "the Ten BlackBerries" were other pseudonyms.

In September 1927, King Oliver turned down a regular booking for his group as the house band at Harlem's Cotton Club; the offer passed to Ellington after Jimmy McHugh suggested him and Mills arranged an audition. Ellington had to increase from a six- to 11-piece group to meet the requirements of the Cotton Club's management for the audition, and the engagement finally began on December 4. With a weekly radio broadcast, the Cotton Club's exclusively white and wealthy clientele poured in nightly to see them. At the Cotton Club, Ellington's group performed all the music for the revues, which mixed comedy, dance numbers, vaudeville, burlesque, music, and illicit alcohol. The musical numbers were composed by Jimmy McHugh and the lyrics were written by Dorothy Fields (later Harold Arlen and Ted Koehler), with some Ellington originals mixed in. (Here, he moved in with a dancer, his second wife Mildred Dixon). Weekly radio broadcasts from the club gave Ellington national exposure. At the same time, Ellington also recorded Fields–McHugh and Fats Waller–Andy Razaf songs.

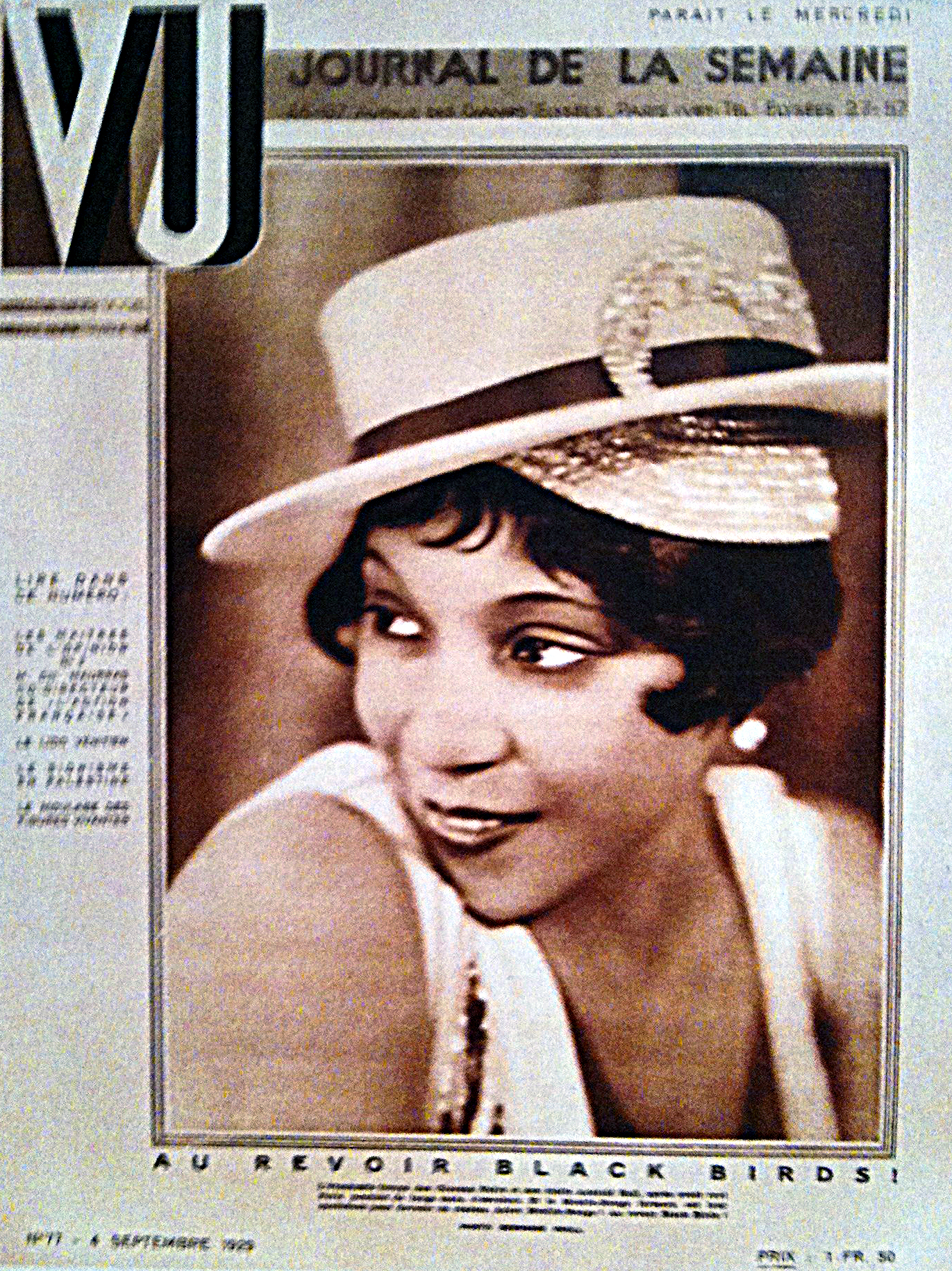
Adelaide Hall recorded "Creole Love Call" with Ellington in 1927. The recording became a worldwide hit.

Although trumpeter Bubber Miley was a member of the orchestra for only a short period, he had a major influence on Ellington's sound. As an early exponent of growl trumpet, Miley changed the sweet dance band sound of the group to one that was hotter, which contemporaries termed "Jungle Style", which can be seen in his feature chorus in "East St. Louis Toodle-Oo" (1926). In October 1927, Ellington and his Orchestra recorded several compositions with Adelaide Hall. One side in particular, "Creole Love Call", became a worldwide sensation and gave both Ellington and Hall their first hit record. Miley had composed most of "Creole Love Call" and "Black and Tan Fantasy". An alcoholic, Miley had to leave the band before they gained wider fame. He died in 1932 at the age of 29, but he was an important influence on Cootie Williams, who replaced him.

In 1929, the Cotton Club Orchestra appeared on stage for several months in Florenz Ziegfeld's Show Girl, along with vaudeville stars Jimmy Durante, Eddie Foy Jr., and Ruby Keeler, and with music and lyrics by George Gershwin and Gus Kahn. Will Vodery, Ziegfeld's musical supervisor, recommended Ellington for the show. According to John Edward Hasse's Beyond Category: The Life and Genius of Duke Ellington, "Perhaps during the run of Show Girl, Ellington received what he later termed 'valuable lessons in orchestration from Will Vody.'" In his 1946 biography, Duke Ellington, Barry Ulanov wrote:

From Vodery, as he (Ellington) says himself, he drew his chromatic convictions, his uses of the tones ordinarily extraneous to the diatonic scale, with the consequent alteration of the harmonic character of his music, it's broadening, The deepening of his resources. It has become customary to ascribe the classical influences upon Duke—Delius, Debussy, and Ravel—to direct contact with their music. Actually, his serious appreciation of those and other modern composers, came after he met with Vody.

Ellington's film work began with Black and Tan (1929), a 19-minute all–African-American RKO short in which he played the hero "Duke". He also appeared in the Amos 'n' Andy film Check and Double Check, released in 1930, which features the orchestra playing "Old Man Blues" in an extended ballroom scene. That year, Ellington and his Orchestra connected with a completely different audience in a concert with Maurice Chevalier, and later, they performed at the Roseland Ballroom, "America's foremost ballroom". Australian-born composer Percy Grainger was an early admirer and supporter. He wrote, "The three greatest composers who ever lived are Bach, Delius and Duke Ellington. Unfortunately, Bach is dead, Delius is very ill but we are happy to have with us today The Duke". Ellington's first period at the Cotton Club concluded in 1931.

=== Early 1930s ===
Ellington led the orchestra by conducting from the keyboard using piano cues and visual gestures; very rarely did he conduct using a baton. By 1932, his orchestra consisted of six brass instruments, four reeds, and a rhythm section of four players. As the leader, Ellington was not a strict disciplinarian; he maintained control of his orchestra with a combination of charm, humor, flattery, and astute psychology. A complex, private person, he revealed his feelings to only his closest intimates. He effectively used his public persona to deflect attention away from himself.

Ellington signed exclusively to Brunswick in 1932 and stayed with them through to late 1936 (albeit with a short-lived 1933–34 switch to Victor when Irving Mills temporarily moved his acts from Brunswick).

As the Great Depression worsened, the recording industry was in crisis, dropping over 90% of its artists by 1933. Ivie Anderson was hired as the Ellington Orchestra's featured vocalist in 1931. She is the vocalist on "It Don't Mean a Thing (If It Ain't Got That Swing)" (1932), among other recordings. Sonny Greer had been providing occasional vocals and continued to do so in a cross-talk feature with Anderson. Radio exposure helped maintain Ellington's public profile as his orchestra began to tour. The other 78s of this era include "Mood Indigo" (1930), "Sophisticated Lady" (1933), "(In My) Solitude" (1934), and "In a Sentimental Mood" (1935).

While Ellington's United States audience remained mainly African-American in this period, the orchestra had a significant following overseas. They traveled to England and Scotland in 1933, as well as France (three concerts at the Salle Pleyel in Paris) and the Netherlands before returning to New York. On June 12, 1933, the Duke Ellington Orchestra gave its British debut at the London Palladium; Ellington received an ovation when he walked on stage. They were one of 13 acts on the bill and were restricted to eight short numbers; the booking lasted until June 24. The British visit saw Ellington win praise from members of the serious music community, including composer Constant Lambert, which gave a boost to Ellington's interest in composing longer works.

Symphony in Black (1935)

His longer pieces had already begun to appear. Ellington had composed and recorded "Creole Rhapsody" as early as 1931 (issued as both sides of a 12-inch record for Victor and both sides of a 10-inch record for Brunswick). A tribute to his mother, "Reminiscing in Tempo", took four 10-inch 78 rpm record sides to record in 1935 after her death in that year. Symphony in Black (also 1935), a short film, featured his extended piece "A Rhapsody of Negro Life". It introduced Billie Holiday and won the Academy Award for Best Musical Short Subject. Ellington and his Orchestra also appeared in the features Murder at the Vanities and Belle of the Nineties (both 1934).

For agent Mills, the attention was a publicity triumph, as Ellington was now internationally known. On the band's tour through the segregated South in 1934, they avoided some of the traveling difficulties of African Americans by touring in private railcars. These provided accessible accommodations, dining, and storage for equipment while avoiding the indignities of segregated facilities.

However, the competition intensified as swing bands like Benny Goodman's began to receive widespread attention. Swing dancing became a youth phenomenon, particularly with white college audiences, and danceability drove record sales and bookings. Jukeboxes proliferated nationwide, spreading the gospel of swing. Ellington's band could certainly swing, but their strengths were mood, nuance, and richness of composition, hence his statement "jazz is music, the swing is business".

=== Later 1930s ===
From 1936, Ellington began to make recordings with smaller groups (sextets, octets, and nonets) drawn from his then-15-man orchestra. He composed pieces intended to feature a specific instrumentalist, such as "Jeep's Blues" for altoist Johnny Hodges, "Yearning for Love" for trombonist Lawrence Brown, "Trumpet in Spades" for Rex Stewart, "Echoes of Harlem" for trumpeter Cootie Williams, and "Clarinet Lament" for Barney Bigard. In 1937, Ellington returned to the Cotton Club, which had relocated to the mid-town Theater District. In the summer of that year, his father died, and due to many expenses, Ellington's finances were tight. However, his situation improved in the following years.

After leaving agent Irving Mills, he signed on with the William Morris Agency. Mills, though, continued to record Ellington. After only a year, his Master and Variety labels (the small groups had recorded for the latter) collapsed in late 1937. Mills placed Ellington back on Brunswick and those small group units on Vocalion through to 1940. Well-known sides continued to be recorded: "Caravan" in 1937, and "I Let a Song Go Out of My Heart" the following year.

Ellington in the Hague, 1939

Billy Strayhorn, originally hired as a lyricist, began his association with Ellington in 1939. Nicknamed "Sweet Pea" for his mild manner, Strayhorn soon became a vital member of the Ellington organization. Ellington showed great fondness for Strayhorn and never failed to speak glowingly of the man and their collaborative working relationship: "my right arm, my left arm, all the eyes in the back of my head, my brain waves in his head, and his in mine". Strayhorn, with his training in classical music, not only contributed his original lyrics and music but also arranged and polished many of Ellington's works, becoming a second Ellington or "Duke's doppelgänger". It was not uncommon for Strayhorn to fill in for Duke, whether in conducting or rehearsing the band, playing the piano, on stage, and in the recording studio. The decade ended with a very successful European tour in 1939 just as World War II loomed in Europe.

=== Early to mid-1940s ===
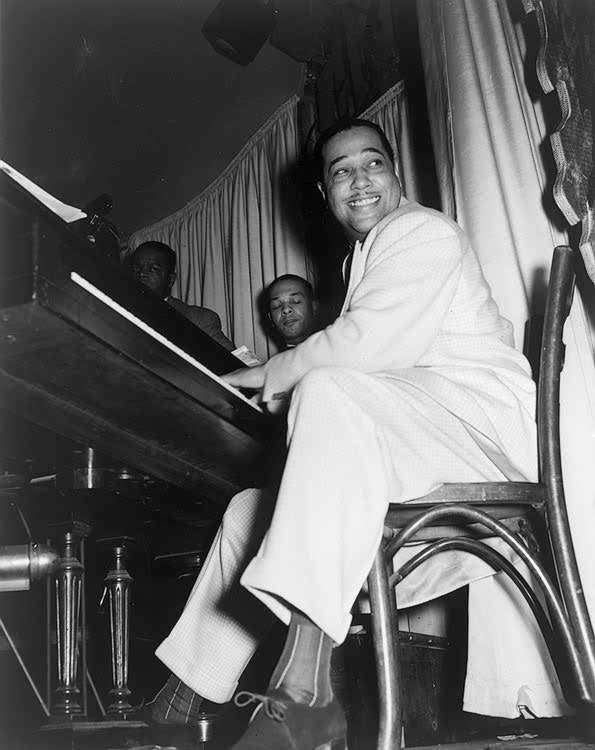
Ellington at the Hurricane Club, Broadway & West 51st Street, New York City, May 1943

Two musicians who joined Ellington at this time created a sensation in their own right: Jimmy Blanton and Ben Webster. Blanton was effectively hired on the spot in late October 1939, before Ellington was aware of his name, when he dropped in on a gig of Fate Marable in St. Louis. The short-lived Blanton transformed the use of double bass in jazz, allowing it to function as a solo and melodic instrument rather than a rhythm instrument alone. Terminal illness forced him to leave by late 1941 after around two years. Ben Webster's principal tenure with Ellington spanned 1939 to 1943. An ambition of his, he told his previous employer, Teddy Wilson, then leading a big band, was that Ellington was the only rival he would leave Wilson for. He was the orchestra's first regular tenor saxophonist and increased the size of the saxophone section to five for the first time. Much influenced by Johnny Hodges, he often credited Hodges with showing him "how to play my horn". The two men sat next to each other in the orchestra.

Trumpeter Ray Nance joined, replacing Cootie Williams who had defected to Benny Goodman. Additionally, Nance added violin to the instrumental colors Ellington had at his disposal. Recordings exist of Nance's first concert date on November 7, 1940, in Fargo, North Dakota. Privately made by Jack Towers and Dick Burris, these recordings were first legitimately issued in 1978 as Duke Ellington at Fargo, 1940 Live; they are among the earliest of innumerable live performances which survive. Nance was an occasional vocalist as well, although Herb Jeffries was the main male vocalist in this era (until 1943) while Al Hibbler (who replaced Jeffries in 1943) continued until 1951. Ivie Anderson left in 1942 for health reasons after 11 years, the longest term of any of Ellington's vocalists.

Ellington was a regular act at the Roseland-State Ballroom in Boston in the 1940's. In the early 1940's, Malcolm X happened to be working at the ballroom as shoeshine boy and both frequently saw Ellington perform and proudly got to shine his shoes.

Once more recording for Victor (from 1940), with the small groups being issued on their Bluebird label, three-minute masterpieces on 78 rpm record sides continued to flow from Ellington; Billy Strayhorn; Ellington's son, Mercer Ellington; and members of the orchestra. "Cotton Tail", "Main Stem", "Harlem Air Shaft", "Jack the Bear", and dozens of others date from this period. Strayhorn's "Take the 'A' Train", a hit in 1941, became the band's theme, replacing "East St. Louis Toodle-Oo". Ellington and his associates wrote for an orchestra of distinctive voices displaying tremendous creativity. The commercial recordings from this era were re-issued in the three-CD collection Never No Lament, in 2003.

Ellington's long-term aim, though, was to extend the jazz form from that three-minute limit, of which he was an acknowledged master. While he had composed and recorded some extended pieces before, such works now became a regular feature of Ellington's output. In this, he was helped by Strayhorn, who had enjoyed a more thorough training in the forms associated with classical music than Ellington. The first of these, Black, Brown and Beige (1943), was dedicated to telling the story of African Americans and the place of slavery and the church in their history. Black, Brown and Beige debuted at Carnegie Hall on January 23, 1943, beginning an annual series of Ellington concerts at the venue over the next four years. While some jazz musicians had played at Carnegie Hall before, none had performed anything as elaborate as Ellington's work. Unfortunately, starting a regular pattern, Ellington's longer works were generally not well received.

A partial exception was Jump for Joy, a full-length musical based on themes of African-American identity, which debuted on July 10, 1941, at the Mayan Theater in Los Angeles. Hollywood actors John Garfield and Mickey Rooney invested in the production, and Charlie Chaplin and Orson Welles offered to direct. At one performance, Garfield insisted that Herb Jeffries, who was light-skinned, should wear makeup. Ellington objected in the interval and compared Jeffries to Al Jolson. The change was reverted. The singer later commented that the audience must have thought he was an entirely different character in the second half of the show.

Although it had sold-out performances and received positive reviews, it ran for only 122 performances until September 29, 1941, with a brief revival in November of that year. Its subject matter did not make it appealing to Broadway; Ellington had unfulfilled plans to take it there. Despite this disappointment, a Broadway production of Ellington's Beggar's Holiday, his sole book musical, premiered on December 23, 1946, under the direction of Nicholas Ray.

The settlement of the first recording ban of 1942–44, leading to an increase in royalties paid to musicians, had a severe effect on the financial viability of the big bands, including Ellington's Orchestra. His income as a songwriter ultimately subsidized it. Although he always spent lavishly and drew a respectable income from the orchestra's operations, the band's income often just covered expenses. In 1943, Ellington asked Webster to leave; the saxophonist's personality made his colleagues anxious and he was regularly in conflict with the leader.

=== Early postwar years ===
Musicians enlisting in the military and travel restrictions made touring difficult for big bands, and dancing became subject to a new tax, which continued for many years, affecting the choices of club owners. By the time World War II ended, the big band era was effectively over as the focus of popular music was shifting towards solo singers such as Frank Sinatra and Jo Stafford. As the cost of hiring big bands had increased, club owners now found smaller jazz groups more cost-effective. Some of Ellington's new works, such as the wordless vocal feature "Transblucency" (1946) with Kay Davis, were not going to have a similar reach as the newly emerging stars.

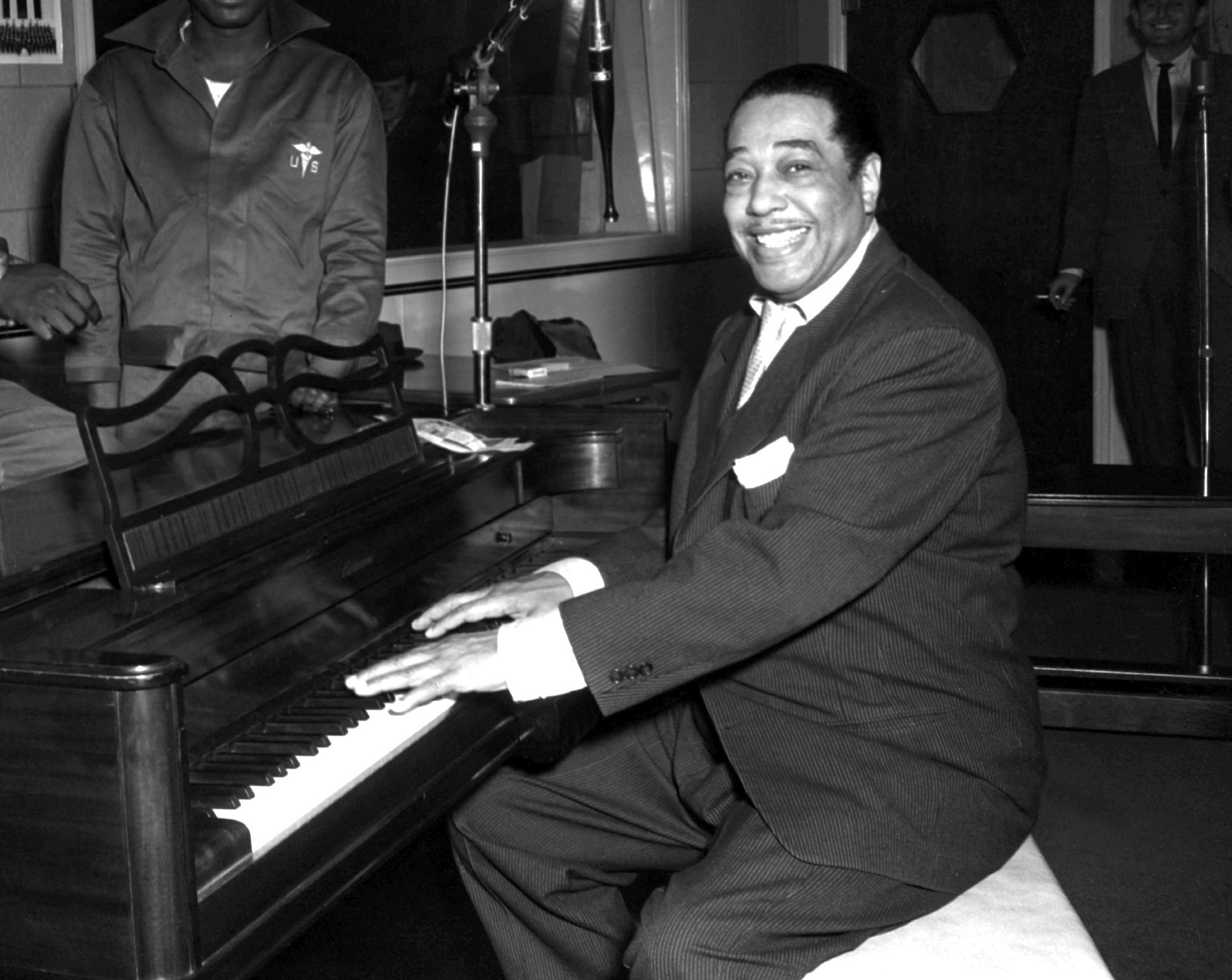
Ellington poses with his piano at the KFG Radio Studio on November 3, 1954

Ellington continued on his own course through these tectonic shifts. While Count Basie, like many other big bands at the time, was forced to disband his whole ensemble and work as an octet for a time, Ellington was able to tour most of Western Europe between April 6 and June 30, 1950, with the orchestra playing 74 dates over 77 days. During the tour, according to Sonny Greer, Ellington did not perform the newer works. However, Ellington's extended composition Harlem (1950), was in the process of being completed at this time. Ellington later presented its score to music-loving President Harry S. Truman. Also during his time in Europe, Ellington would compose the music for a stage production by Orson Welles. Titled Time Runs in Paris, and An Evening with Orson Welles in Frankfurt, the variety show also featured a newly discovered Eartha Kitt, who performed Ellington's original song "Hungry Little Trouble" as Helen of Troy. Ellington recorded his first long play record (LP) in December 1950, Masterpieces by Ellington, consisting of extended, complex new "concert arrangements" of the 1930s classics "Mood Indigo", "Sophisticated Lady", and "(In My) Solitude", along with the more recent tone poem "The Tattooed Bride", fashioned by Ellington and Strayhorn.

In 1951, Ellington suffered a significant loss of personnel: Sonny Greer, Lawrence Brown, and, most importantly, Johnny Hodges left to pursue other ventures. However, only Greer was a permanent departee. Drummer Louie Bellson replaced Greer, and his "Skin Deep" was a hit for Ellington. Tenor saxophonist Paul Gonsalves had joined in December 1950, after periods with Count Basie and Dizzy Gillespie, and stayed for the rest of his life, while Clark Terry joined in November 1951.

André Previn said in 1952, "You know, Stan Kenton can stand in front of a thousand fiddles and a thousand brass and make a dramatic gesture and every studio arranger can nod his head and say, Oh, yes, that's done like this. But Duke merely lifts his finger, three horns make a sound, and I don't know what it is!" However, by 1955, after three years of recording for Capitol, Ellington lacked a regular recording affiliation.

=== Career revival ===
Ellington's appearance at the Newport Jazz Festival on July 7, 1956, returned him to wider prominence. The feature "Diminuendo and Crescendo in Blue" comprised two tunes that had been in the band's book since 1937. Ellington, who had abruptly ended the band's scheduled set because of the late arrival of four key players, called the two tunes as the time was approaching midnight. Announcing that the two pieces would be separated by an interlude played by tenor saxophonist Paul Gonsalves, Ellington proceeded to lead the band through the two pieces, with Gonsalves's 27-chorus marathon solo whipping the crowd into a frenzy, leading the maestro to play way beyond the curfew time despite urgent pleas from festival organizer George Wein to bring the program to an end.

The concert made international headlines, led to one of only five Time magazine cover stories dedicated to a jazz musician, and resulted in an album produced by George Avakian that would become the best-selling LP of Ellington's career. Much of the music on the LP was, in effect, simulated, with only about 40% actually from the concert itself. According to Avakian, Ellington was dissatisfied with aspects of the performance and felt the musicians had been under-rehearsed. The band assembled the next day to re-record several numbers with the addition of the faked sound of a crowd, none of which was disclosed to purchasers of the album. Not until 1999 was the concert recording properly released for the first time. The revived attention brought about by the Newport appearance should not have surprised anyone—Johnny Hodges had returned the previous year, and Ellington's collaboration with Strayhorn was renewed around the same time, under terms more amenable to the younger man.

The original Ellington at Newport album was the first release in a new recording contract with Columbia Records which yielded several years of recording stability, mainly under producer Irving Townsend, who coaxed both commercial and artistic productions from Ellington.

In 1957, CBS (Columbia Records' parent corporation) aired a live television production of A Drum Is a Woman, an allegorical suite which received mixed reviews. Festival appearances at the new Monterey Jazz Festival and elsewhere provided venues for live exposure, and a European tour in 1958 was well received. Such Sweet Thunder (1957), based on Shakespeare's plays and characters, and The Queen's Suite (1958), dedicated to Britain's Queen Elizabeth II, were products of the renewed impetus which the Newport appearance helped to create. However, the latter work was not commercially issued at the time. The late-1950s also saw Ella Fitzgerald record her Duke Ellington Songbook (on Verve) with Ellington and his orchestra—a recognition that Ellington's songs had now become part of the cultural canon known as the "Great American Songbook".

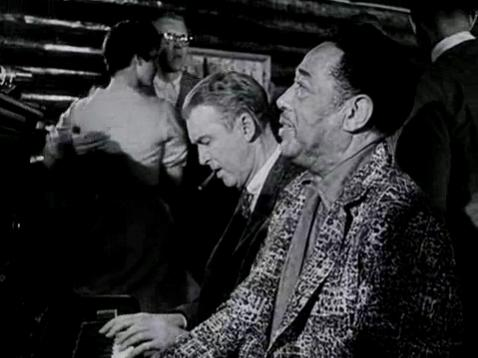
James Stewart and Ellington in Anatomy of a Murder (1959)

Around this time, Ellington and Strayhorn began to work on film scoring. The first of these was Anatomy of a Murder (1959), a courtroom drama directed by Otto Preminger and featuring James Stewart, in which Ellington appeared fronting a roadhouse combo. Film historians have recognized the score "as a landmark—the first significant Hollywood film music by African Americans comprising non-diegetic music, that is, music whose source is not visible or implied by action in the film, like an on-screen band." The score avoided the cultural stereotypes which previously characterized jazz scores and rejected a strict adherence to visuals in ways that presaged the New Wave cinema of the '60s. Ellington and Strayhorn, always looking for new musical territory, produced suites for John Steinbeck's novel Sweet Thursday, Tchaikovsky's Nutcracker Suite, and Edvard Grieg's Peer Gynt.

Anatomy of a Murder was followed by Paris Blues (1961), which featured Paul Newman and Sidney Poitier as jazz musicians. For this work, Ellington was nominated for the Academy Award for Best Score.

In the early 1960s, Ellington embraced recording with artists who had been friendly rivals in the past or were younger musicians who focused on later styles. The Ellington and Count Basie orchestras recorded together with the album First Time! The Count Meets the Duke (1961). During a period when Ellington was between recording contracts, he made records with Louis Armstrong (Roulette), Coleman Hawkins, John Coltrane (both for Impulse!), and participated in a session with Charles Mingus and Max Roach which produced the album Money Jungle (1963, United Artists). He signed to Frank Sinatra's new Reprise label, but his association with the label was short-lived.

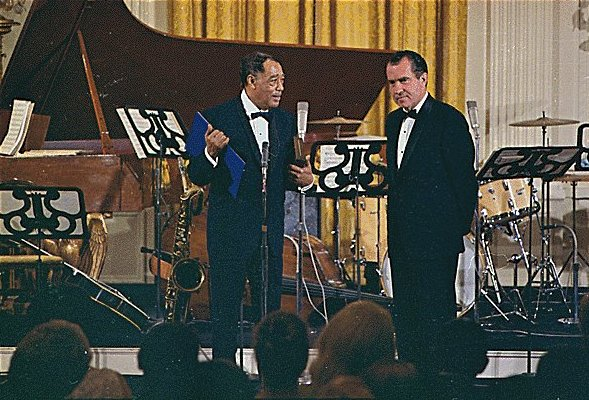
Ellington receiving the Presidential Medal of Freedom from President Nixon in 1969

Musicians who had previously worked with Ellington returned to the Orchestra as members: Lawrence Brown in 1960 and Cootie Williams in 1962.

The writing and playing of music is a matter of intent ... You can't just throw a paintbrush against the wall and call whatever happens art. My music fits the tonal personality of the player. I think too strongly in terms of altering my music to fit the performer to be impressed by accidental music. You can't take doodling seriously.

He was now performing worldwide and spent a significant part of each year on overseas tours. As a consequence, he formed new working relationships with artists from around the world, including the Swedish vocalist Alice Babs, and the South African musicians Dollar Brand and Sathima Bea Benjamin (A Morning in Paris, 1997 [1963]).

Ellington wrote an original score for director Michael Langham's production of Shakespeare's Timon of Athens at the Stratford Festival in Ontario, Canada, which opened on July 29, 1963. Langham has used it for several subsequent productions, including a much later adaptation by Stanley Silverman which expands the score with some of Ellington's best-known works.

=== Last years ===
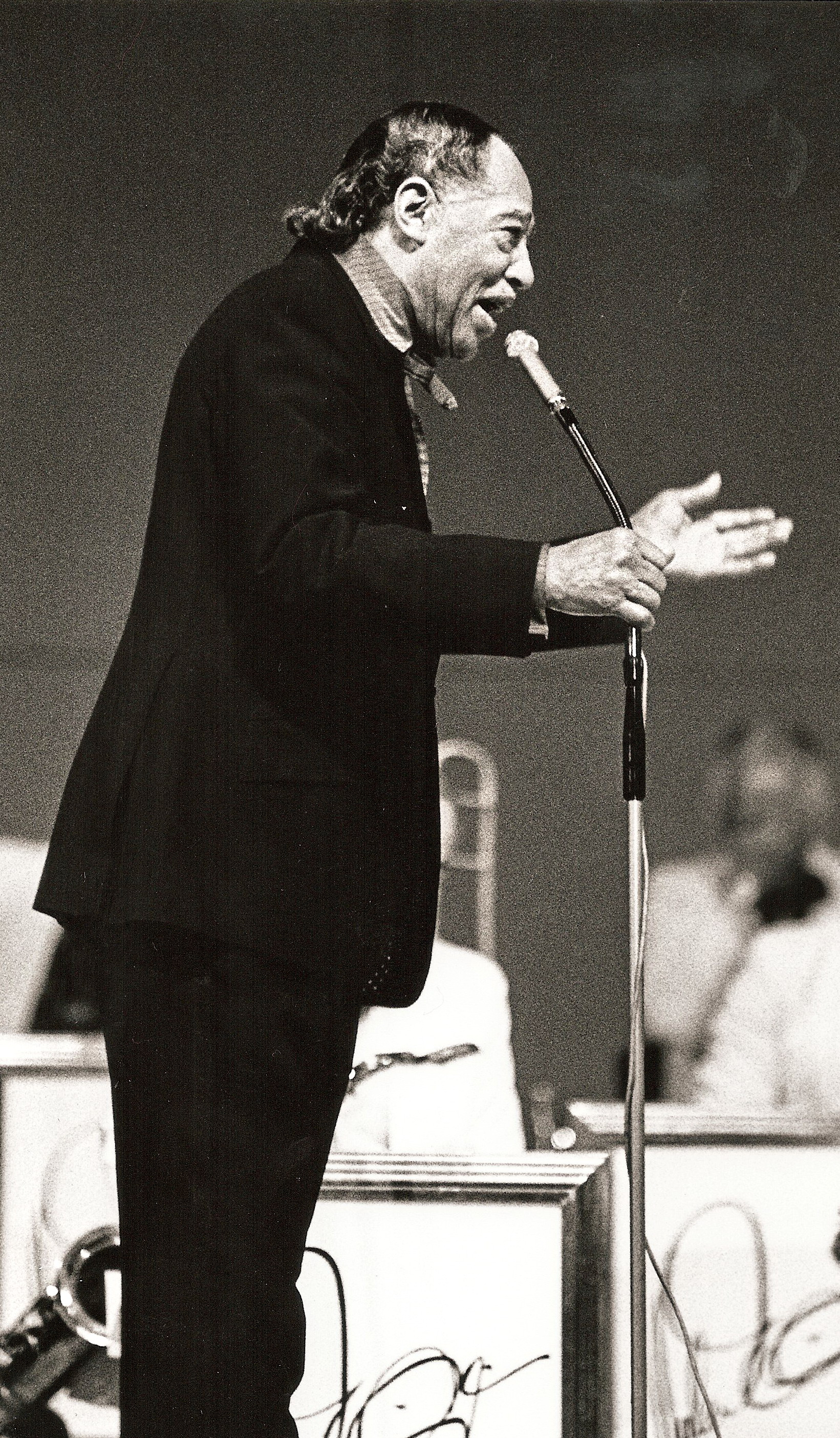
Ellington in Munich, 1973

Ellington was shortlisted for the Pulitzer Prize for Music in 1965. However, no prize was ultimately awarded that year. Then 66 years old, he joked, "Fate is being kind to me. Fate doesn't want me to be famous too young." In 1999, he was posthumously awarded a Special Pulitzer Prize "commemorating the centennial year of his birth, in recognition of his musical genius, which evoked aesthetically the principles of democracy through the medium of jazz and thus made an indelible contribution to art and culture."

In September 1965, he premiered the first of his Sacred Concerts; he created a jazz Christian liturgy. Although the work received mixed reviews, Ellington was proud of the composition and performed it dozens of times. This concert was followed by two others of the same type in 1968 and 1973, known as the Second and Third Sacred Concerts. Many saw the Sacred Music suites as an attempt to reinforce commercial support for organized religion. However, Ellington simply said it was "the most important thing I've done". The Steinway piano upon which the Sacred Concerts were composed is part of the collection of the Smithsonian's National Museum of American History. Like Haydn and Mozart, Ellington conducted his orchestra from the piano—he always played the keyboard parts when the Sacred Concerts were performed.

Ellington turned 65 in the spring of 1964 but showed no sign of slowing down as he continued to make recordings of significant works such as the Far East Suite (1966), New Orleans Suite (1970), The Afro-Eurasian Eclipse (1971), and the Latin American Suite (1972), much of it inspired by his world tours. It was during this time that he recorded his only album with Frank Sinatra, titled Francis A. & Edward K. (1967). In August 1972, he recorded several solo piano tracks at Mediasound Studios in New York, with the then brand-new assistant engineer Bob Clearmountain. The session remained unreleased until 2017, when Storyville Records released it as An Intimate Piano Session.

In 1972–1974, Ellington worked on his only opera, Queenie Pie, together with Maurice Peress. Ellington got an idea to write an opera about a black beautician in the 1930s, but did not finish it.

The final new recorded material Ellington released was a collaboration with Teresa Brewer titled It Don't Mean a Thing If It Don't Got That Swing, released on her husband Bob Thiele's label, Flying Dutchman Records, in the UK in 1973, and in the US the following year. Among the last shows Ellington and his orchestra performed were one on March 21, 1973, at Purdue University's Hall of Music, two on March 22, 1973, at the Sturges-Young Auditorium in Sturgis, Michigan, and the Eastbourne Performance on December 1, 1973, later issued on LP. Ellington performed what is considered his final full concert in a ballroom at Northern Illinois University on March 20, 1974. Since 1980, that ballroom has been dedicated as the "Duke Ellington Ballroom". His last work was Three Black Kings, dedicated to Balthazar, Solomon, and Martin Luther King Jr.

== Personal life ==
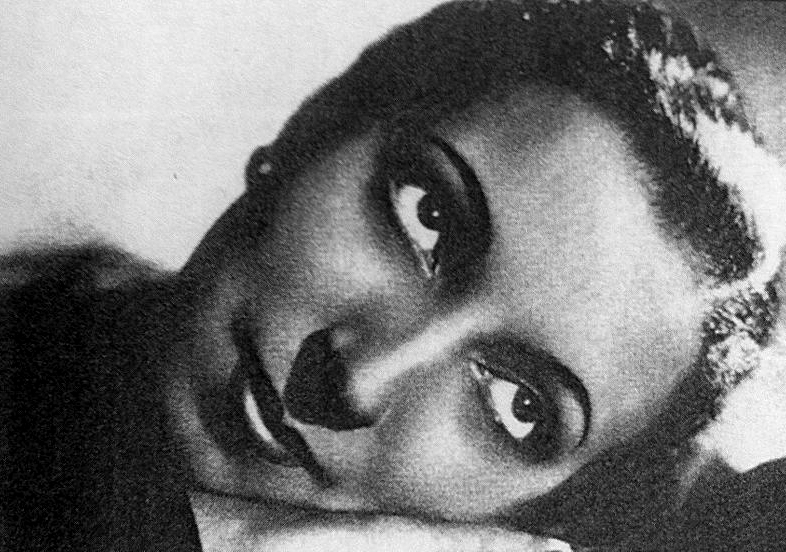
Mercer referred to Mildred Dixon as his mother

Ellington married his high school sweetheart, Edna Thompson (1898–1967), on July 2, 1918, when he was 19. The next spring, on March 11, 1919, Edna gave birth to their only child, Mercer Kennedy Ellington (d. 1996).

Ellington was joined in New York City by his wife and son in the late 1920s, but the couple soon permanently separated. According to her obituary in Jet magazine, she was "homesick for Washington" and returned. In 1929, Ellington became the companion of Mildred Dixon, who traveled with him; managed Tempo Music; inspired songs, such as "Sophisticated Lady", at the peak of his career; and raised his son.

In 1938, he left his family (when Mercer was 19) and moved in with Beatrice "Evie" Ellis, a Cotton Club employee. Their relationship, though stormy, continued after Ellington met and formed a relationship with Fernanda de Castro Monte in the early 1960s. Ellington supported both women for the rest of his life.

Ellington's sister Ruth (1915–2004) later ran Tempo Music, his music publishing company. Ruth's second husband was the bass-baritone McHenry Boatwright, whom she met when he sang at her brother's funeral. As an adult, Mercer played trumpet and piano, led his own band, worked as his father's business manager, and kept the Ellington band alive for 20 years after Duke's death.

Ellington was a member of the Alpha Phi Alpha fraternity and was a Freemason associated with Prince Hall Freemasonry.

== Death ==
Ellington died on May 24, 1974, of complications from lung cancer and pneumonia, aged 75. At his funeral, attended by over 12,000 people at the Cathedral of St. John the Divine, Ella Fitzgerald summed up the occasion: "It's a very sad day. A genius has passed."

He was interred in the Woodlawn Cemetery, the Bronx, New York City.

== Legacy ==
=== Memorialized ===
Numerous memorials have been dedicated to Duke Ellington in cities from New York and Washington, D.C., to Los Angeles.

In Ellington's birthplace, Washington, D.C., the Duke Ellington School of the Arts educates talented students who are considering careers in the arts by providing art instruction and academic programs to prepare students for post-secondary education and professional careers. In 1974, the District renamed the Calvert Street Bridge, originally built in 1935, as the Duke Ellington Bridge. Another school is P.S. 004 Duke Ellington in New York.

In 1989, a bronze plaque was attached to the newly named Duke Ellington Building at 2121 Ward Place NW. In 2012, the new owner of the building commissioned a mural by Aniekan Udofia that appears above the lettering "Duke Ellington". In 2010, the triangular park, across the street from Duke Ellington's birth site, at the intersection of New Hampshire and M Streets NW, was named the Duke Ellington Park.

Ellington's residence at 2728 Sherman Avenue NW, during the years 1919–1922, is marked by a bronze plaque.

On February 24, 2009, the United States Mint issued a coin featuring Duke Ellington, making him the first African American to appear by himself on a circulating U.S. coin. Ellington appears on the reverse (tails) side of the District of Columbia quarter. The coin is part of the U.S. Mint's program honoring the District and the U.S. territories and celebrates Ellington's birthplace in the District of Columbia. Ellington is depicted on the quarter seated at a piano, sheet music in hand, along with the inscription "Justice for All", which is the District's motto.

In 1986, a United States commemorative stamp was issued featuring Ellington's likeness.

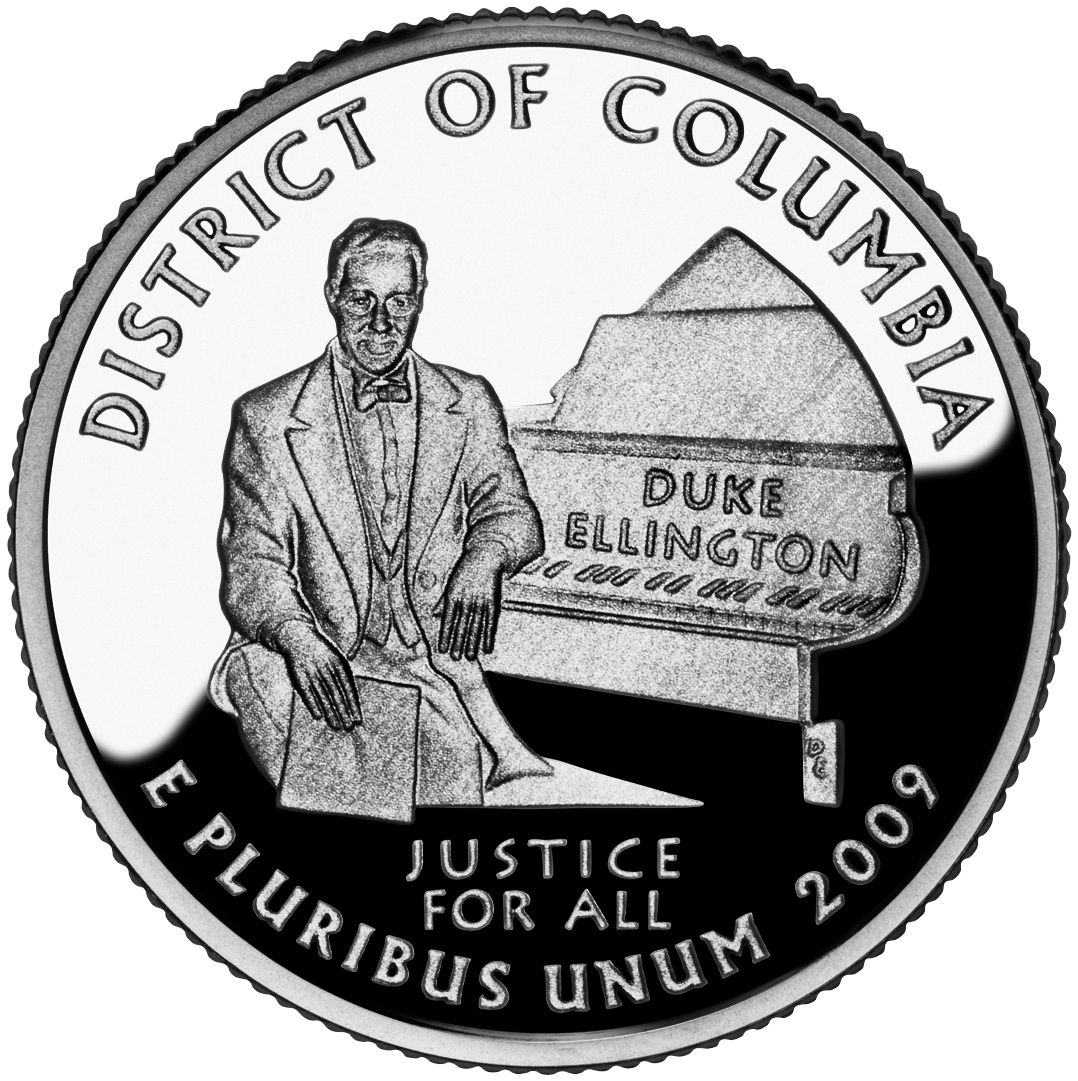
Ellington on the Washington, D.C., quarter released in 2009

Ellington lived out his final years in Manhattan, in a townhouse at 333 Riverside Drive, near West 106th Street. His sister Ruth, who managed his publishing company, also lived there, and his son Mercer lived next door. After his death, West 106th Street was officially renamed Duke Ellington Boulevard.

A large memorial to Ellington, created by sculptor Robert Graham, was dedicated in 1997 in New York's Central Park, near Fifth Avenue and 110th Street, an intersection named Duke Ellington Circle.

A statue of Ellington at a piano is featured at the entrance to Schoenberg Hall at University of California, Los Angeles (UCLA). According to UCLA magazine,

When UCLA students were entranced by Duke Ellington's provocative tunes at a Culver City club in 1937, they asked the budding musical great to play a free concert in Royce Hall. "I've been waiting for someone to ask us!", Ellington exclaimed. On the day of the concert, Ellington accidentally mixed up the venues and drove to USC instead. He eventually arrived at the UCLA campus and, to apologize for his tardiness, played to the packed crowd for more than four hours. And so, "Sir Duke" and his group played the first-ever jazz performance in a concert venue.

The Essentially Ellington High School Jazz Band Competition and Festival is a nationally renowned annual competition for prestigious high school bands. Started in 1996 at Jazz at Lincoln Center, the festival is named after Ellington because of the significant focus that the festival places on his works.

=== Tributes ===
After Duke died, his son Mercer took over leadership of the orchestra, continuing until he died in 1996. Like the Count Basie Orchestra, this "ghost band" continued to release albums for many years. Digital Duke, credited to the Duke Ellington Orchestra, won the 1988 Grammy Award for Best Large Jazz Ensemble Album. Mercer Ellington had been handling all administrative aspects of his father's business for several decades. Mercer's children continue a connection with their grandfather's work.

Gunther Schuller wrote in 1989,

Ellington composed incessantly to the very last days of his life. Music was indeed his mistress; it was his total life and his commitment to it was incomparable and unalterable. In jazz he was a giant among giants. And in twentieth century music, he may yet one day be recognized as one of the half-dozen greatest masters of our time.

Martin Williams said, "Duke Ellington lived long enough to hear himself named among our best composers. And since his death in 1974, it has become not at all uncommon to see him named, along with Charles Ives, as the greatest composer we have produced, regardless of category."

In the opinion of Bob Blumenthal of The Boston Globe in 1999, "In the century since his birth, there has been no greater composer, American or otherwise, than Edward Kennedy Ellington."

In 2002, scholar Molefi Kete Asante listed Duke Ellington on his list of 100 Greatest African Americans.

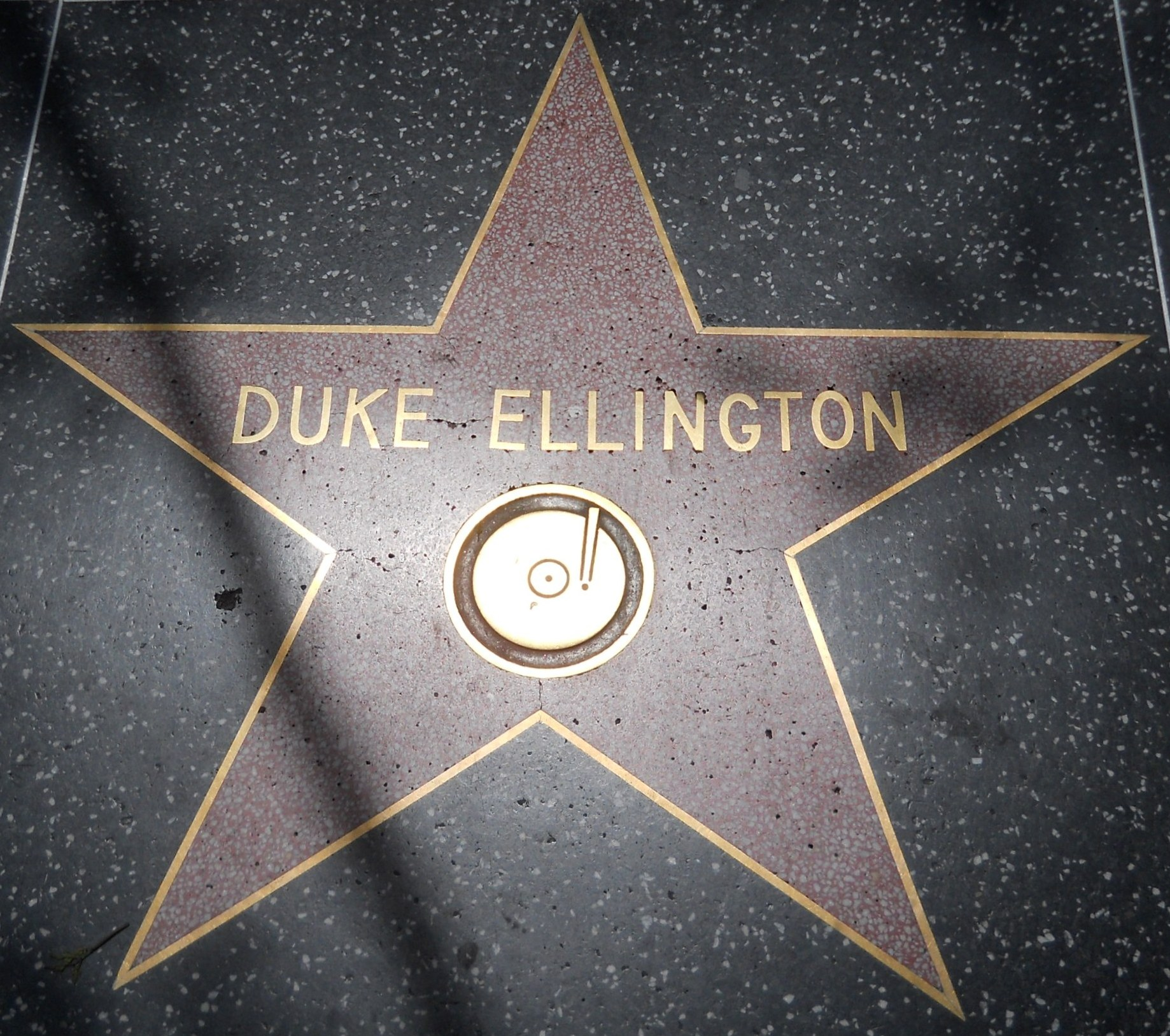
Ellington's star on the Hollywood Walk of Fame at 6535 Hollywood Blvd.

His compositions have been revisited by artists and musicians worldwide as sources of inspiration and a bedrock of their performing careers:

- Dave Brubeck dedicated "The Duke" (1954) to Ellington and it became a standard covered by others, including Miles Davis on his Miles Ahead, 1957. The album The Real Ambassadors has a vocal version of this piece, "You Swing Baby (The Duke)", with lyrics by Iola Brubeck, Dave Brubeck's wife. It is performed as a duet between Louis Armstrong and Carmen McRae. It is also dedicated to Duke Ellington.
- Miles Davis created his half-hour dirge "He Loved Him Madly" (on Get Up with It, released in 1974) as a tribute to Ellington one month after his death.
- Charles Mingus, who had been fired by Ellington decades earlier, wrote the elegy "Duke Ellington's Sound of Love" in 1974, a few months after Ellington's death.
- Stevie Wonder wrote the song "Sir Duke" as a tribute to Ellington, which appeared on his album Songs in the Key of Life released in 1976.
- Judy Collins wrote and sang "Song for Duke" on her 1975 album titled Judith.

There are hundreds of albums dedicated to the music of Duke Ellington and Billy Strayhorn by artists famous and obscure. Sophisticated Ladies, an award-winning 1981 musical revue, incorporated many tunes from Ellington's repertoire. A second Broadway musical interpolating Ellington's music, Play On!, debuted in 1997.

== Awards and honors ==
- 1960: Hollywood Walk of Fame, contribution to recording industry
- 1964: Honorary Doctorate of Humanities from Milton College
- 1966: Grammy Lifetime Achievement Award
- 1969: the Presidential Medal of Freedom, the highest civilian award in the U.S.
- 1971: Honorary PhD from the Berklee College of Music
- 1973: the Legion of Honour by France, its highest civilian honor
- 1999: posthumous Special Pulitzer Prize for his lifetime contributions to music and culture

=== Grammy Awards ===
Ellington earned 14 Grammy Awards from 1959 to 2000 (three of which were posthumous) and a total of 25 nominations

Duke Ellington Grammy Award History
Year	Category	Title	Genre	Result
1999	Historical Album	The Duke Ellington Centennial Edition; RCA Victor Recordings (1927–1973)	Jazz	Won
1979	Best Jazz Instrumental Performance, Big Band	Duke Ellington at Fargo, 1940 Live	Jazz	Won
1976	Best Jazz Performance by a Big Band	The Ellington Suites	Jazz	Won
1972	Best Jazz Performance by a Big Band	Togo Brava Suite	Jazz	Won
1971	Best Jazz Performance by a Big Band	New Orleans Suite	Jazz	Won
1971	Best Instrumental Composition	New Orleans Suite	Composing/Arranging	Nominated
1970	Best Instrumental Jazz Performance – Large Group or Soloist with Large Group	Duke Ellington – 70th Birthday Concert	Jazz	Nominated
1968	Trustees Award	National Trustees Award – 1968	Special Awards	Won
1968	Best Instrumental Jazz Performance – Large Group or Soloist with Large Group	...And His Mother Called Him Bill	Jazz	Won
1967	Best Instrumental Jazz Performance, Large Group or Soloist with Large Group	Far East Suite	Jazz	Won
1966	Bing Crosby Award – name changed to Grammy Lifetime Achievement Award in 1982	Bing Crosby Award – name changed to Grammy Lifetime Achievement Award in 1982	Special Awards	Won
1966	Best Original Jazz Composition	"In the Beginning God"	Jazz	Won
1966	Best Instrumental Jazz Performance – Group or Soloist with Group	Concert of Sacred Music (album)	Jazz	Nominated
1965	Best Instrumental Jazz Performance – Large Group or Soloist with Large Group	Ellington '66	Jazz	Won
1965	Best Original Jazz Composition	Virgin Islands Suite	Jazz	Nominated
1964	Best Original Jazz Composition	Night Creature	Jazz	Nominated
1964	Best Jazz Performance – Large Group (Instrumental)	First Time! (album)	Jazz	Nominated
1961	Best Instrumental Theme or Instrumental Version of Song	"Paris Blues"	Composing/Arranging	Nominated
1961	Best Sound Track Album or Recording of Score from Motion Picture or Television	Paris Blues (motion picture; album)	Music for Visual Media	Nominated
1960	Best Jazz Performance Solo or Small Group	Back to Back: Duke Ellington and Johnny Hodges Play the Blues	Jazz	Nominated
1960	Best Jazz Composition of More Than Five Minutes Duration	"Idiom '59"	Jazz	Nominated
1959	Best Performance by a Dance Band	Anatomy of a Murder	Pop	Won
1959	Best Musical Composition First Recorded and Released in 1959 (More Than 5 Minutes Duration)	Anatomy of a Murder	Composing	Won
1959	Best Sound Track Album – Background Score from a Motion Picture or Television	Anatomy of a Murder	Composing	Won
1959	Best Jazz Performance – Group	Ellington Jazz Party (album)	Jazz	Nominated

=== Grammy Hall of Fame ===
Recordings of Duke Ellington were inducted into the Grammy Hall of Fame, a special Grammy award established in 1973 to honor recordings at least 25 years old that have qualitative or historical significance.

Duke Ellington: Grammy Hall of Fame Award
Year Recorded	Title	Genre	Label	Year Inducted
1932	"It Don't Mean a Thing (If It Ain't Got That Swing)"	Jazz (single)	Brunswick	2008
1934	"Cocktails for Two"	Jazz (single)	Victor	2007
1957	Ellington at Newport	Jazz (album)	Columbia	2004
1956	"Diminuendo and Crescendo in Blue"	Jazz (single)	Columbia	1999
1967	Far East Suite	Jazz (album)	RCA	1999
1944	Black, Brown and Beige	Jazz (single)	RCA Victor	1990
1928	"Black and Tan Fantasy"	Jazz (single)	Victor	1981
1941	"Take the 'A' Train"	Jazz (single)	Victor	1976
1931	"Mood Indigo"	Jazz (single)	Brunswick	1975

=== Honors and inductions ===
Year	Category	Notes
2022	Foundational	June 18, 2022
2009	Commemorative U.S. quarter	D.C. and U.S. Territories Quarters Program
2008	Gennett Records Walk of Fame	
2004	Nesuhi Ertegun Jazz Hall of Fame at Jazz at Lincoln Center	
1999	Pulitzer Prize	Special Citation
1992	Oklahoma Jazz Hall of Fame	
1986	22-cent commemorative U.S. stamp	Issued April 29, 1986
1978	Big Band and Jazz Hall of Fame	
1973	French Legion of Honour	July 6, 1973
1973	Honorary Degree in Music from Columbia University	May 16, 1973
1971	Honorary Doctorate Degree from Berklee College of Music	
1971	Honorary Doctor of Music from Howard University	
1971	Songwriters Hall of Fame	
1969	Presidential Medal of Freedom	
1968	Grammy Trustees Award	Special Merit Award
1967	Honorary Doctor of Music Degree from Yale University	
1966	Grammy Lifetime Achievement Award	
1964	Honorary degree, Milton College, Wisconsin	
1959	NAACP Spingarn Medal	
1957	German Film Award (Deutscher Filmpreis): Best Music	Award won for the movie Jonas with fellow composer Winfried Zillig
1956	DownBeat Jazz Hall of Fame inductee	

== See also ==
- List of people with synesthesia
- List of people from Harlem

== Bibliography ==
- Africville Genealogy Society, ed. (2010) [1992]. The Spirit of Africville. Halifax: Formac Publishing. ISBN 978-0887809255.
- Büchmann-Møller, Frank (2006). Someone to Watch Over Me: The Life and Music of Ben Webster. Ann Arbor, MI: The University of Michigan Press. ISBN 978-0472114702.
- Cohen, Harvey G. (2010). Duke Ellington's America. Chicago: University of Chicago Press. ISBN 978-0226112633.
  - —— (2010). "An excerpt from Duke Ellington's America". University of Chicago Press.
- Ellington, Duke (1976). Music Is My Mistress. New York: Da Capo. ISBN 0704330903.
- Feather, Leonard (1960). The Jazz Encyclopedia. Da Capo. ISBN 0-306-80214-7.
- Green, Edward (2015). The Cambridge Companion to Duke Ellington. Cambridge, UK: Cambridge University Press. ISBN 978-1316194133.
- Hajdu, David (1996). Lush Life: A Biography of Billy Strayhorn. New York: Farrar, Straus & Giroux. ISBN 978-0865475120.
- Hasse, John Edward (1993), Beyond Category: The Life and Genius of Duke Ellington, New York: Simon & Schuster, ISBN 0-671-70387-0.
- Hasse, John Edward (1995). Beyond Category: The Life and Genius of Duke Ellington. New York: Da Capo. ISBN 0306806142.
- Lawrence, A. H. (2001). Duke Ellington and His World: A Biography. New York: Routledge. ISBN 041593012X.
- Stratemann, Klaus (1992). Duke Ellington: Day by Day and Film by Film. Copenhagen: JazzMedia. ISBN 8788043347. Covers all of Duke's travels and films from the 1929 short film Black and Tan onwards.
- Teachout, Terry (2015). Duke. New York: Gotham Books. ISBN 978-1592407491.
- Terkel, Studs (2002). Giants of Jazz (2nd ed.). New York: The New Press. ISBN 978-1565847699.
- Tucker, Mark, ed. (1993). The Duke Ellington Reader. New York: Oxford University Press. ISBN 978-0195093919.
- Weisbard, Eric, ed. (2004). This Is Pop: In Search of the Elusive at Experience Music Project. Cambridge: Harvard University Press. ISBN 0674013441.
