= Bradley First Lutheran Church =

Historic church in South Dakota, United States

- U.S. National Register of Historic Places
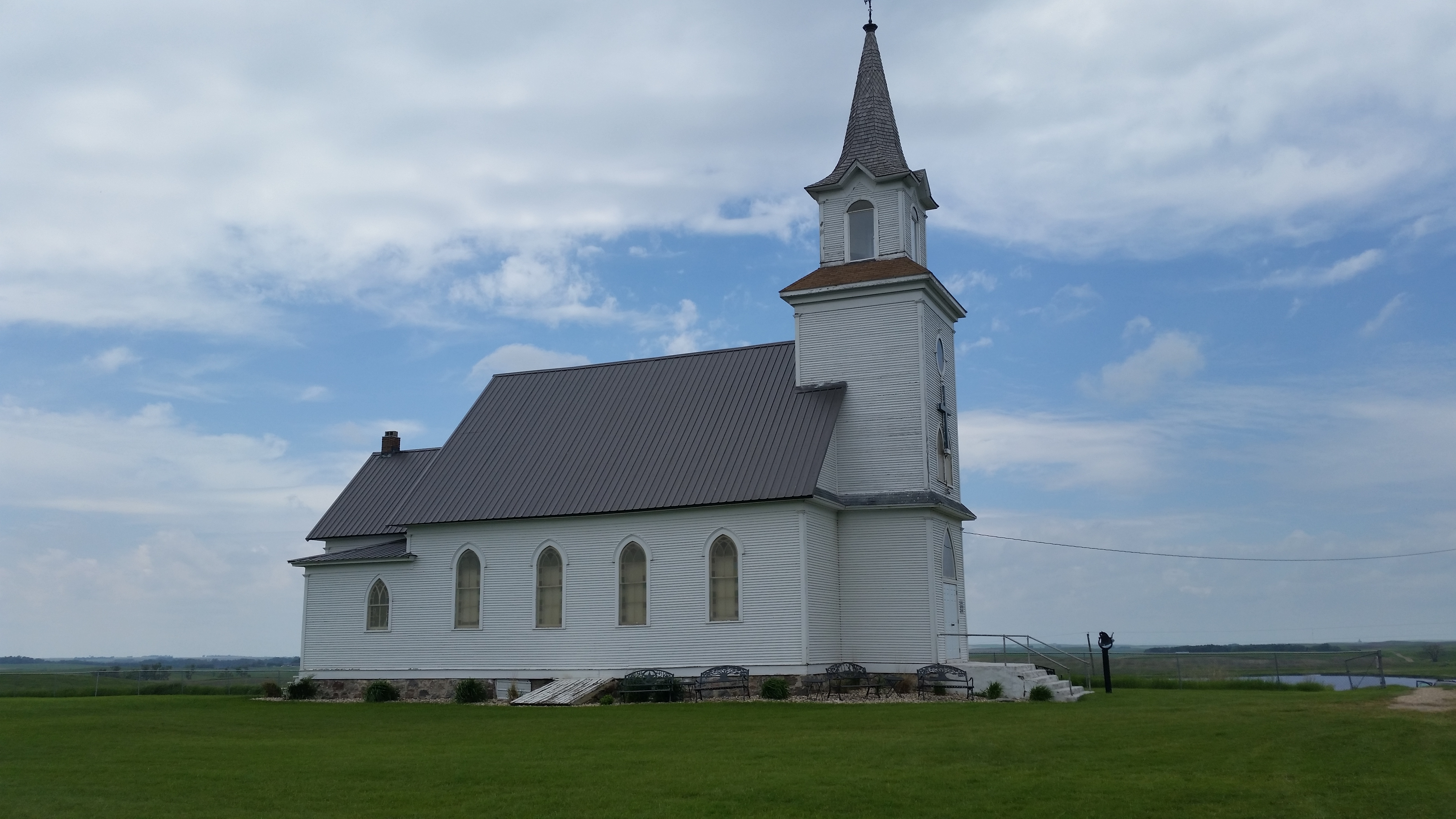

- Location within South Dakota Location within the United States
- Nearest city: Bradley, South Dakota
- Coordinates: 45°03′51″N 97°43′02″W
- Area: 2 acres (0.81 ha)
- Built: 1914
- Architect: Olson, Hans
- Architectural style: Gothic Revival
- NRHP reference No.: 00001213
- Added to NRHP: October 12, 2000

Bradley First Lutheran Church (also known as Calvary Lutheran Church) is a historic Lutheran church in Bradley, South Dakota.

It was built in 1914 in a Gothic Revival style by Hans Olson and was added to the National Register of Historic Places in 2000.

Roger Zwieg is buried in the cemetery at Calvary Lutheran Church.
