= Duke Ellington at Fargo, 1940 Live =

1978 album by Duke Ellington

Live album by Duke Ellington
- Released: 1978
- Recorded: 7 November 1940
- Venue: Fargo, North Dakota
- Genres: Jazz, big band
- Label: Book-of-the-Month

Duke Ellington at Fargo, 1940 Live is a live album by the Duke Ellington Orchestra that won the Grammy Award for Best Large Jazz Ensemble Album in 1980. The album was recorded at a dance in Fargo, North Dakota.

== Background ==
In 1939, two cooperative extension service workers and former South Dakota State College students, Jack Towers and Richard Burris, sought permission from the William Morris Agency representing Duke Ellington to record an upcoming concert in Fargo, North Dakota. Permission was granted to the two Ellington fans provided they receive permission from Ellington and the venue's manager before the show.

The show was held on 7 November 1940 at the Crystal Ballroom on the second floor of the Fargo City Auditorium at the corner of First Avenue South and Broadway. The building was demolished in 1962. The concert was a dance, a normal venue for jazz bands at that time but an unusual setting for a live recording, most of which would have been made of concerts, nightclubs, or radio broadcasts. The Crystal Ballroom featured a glass ball two feet in diameter hanging from the ceiling that reflected the dancehall's lights.

=== Recording ===
The original recording of At Fargo was effectively an amateur, bootleg recording, albeit approved. The recording equipment included a Presto portable turntable that cut the recording into 16-inch, 33 1/3-rpm acetate-covered aluminum disks. The recording turntable was set up next to Ellington's piano. Five and one-half of six disks with a recording capacity of 15 minutes per side were used in the recording. A Fargo radio station, KVOX (now KVXR), broadcast part of the show live.

Ellington's orchestra played several warm-up pieces before Ellington came out to his piano. The band then played "Sepia Panorama", the band's theme song before adoption of "Take the 'A' Train" in 1941. In addition to Ellington himself, notable soloists included Ben Webster, Jimmy Blanton, Johnny Hodges, Rex Stewart, and Tricky Sam Nanton.

Trumpeter Ray Nance had recently joined the band after Cootie Williams had left to play with Benny Goodman and, the night of the concert, Ellington told Towers that his trumpet section was in "rough shape". The concert included the first performance of "Star Dust" by the band as a whole. After the show, Towers and Burris played parts of the recording for Ellington and his bandmates.

Jack Towers later said, "When Dick and I recorded this Fargo performance, we did it just for the excitement and pleasure of it all. We had no idea that people all over the world would be listening to it 60 years later."

Jack Towers was interviewed in 1980 for NPR's Morning Edition, following receiving the Grammy Award.

=== Later history ===
Burris and Towers had promised the William Morris Agency not to use the live recording for commercial purposes and it was heard only from the original disks until the 1960s. Towers dubbed a tape for an acquaintance and subsequent copies eventually appeared as a bootleg in Europe.

Towers was in charge of radio broadcasting at the U.S. Department of Agriculture from 1952 to 1974 but remastering recordings remained a hobby and became a career after his retirement.

In the 1970s, Towers made a reproduction of the recording from areas of the groove that were less worn. In 1978, Towers' master of At Fargo was finally officially released by Book-of-the-Month Records as a Book-of-the-Month Club selection.

The original acetate disks have since been donated to the Archives Center of the Smithsonian Institution's National Museum of American History.

== Commercial releases ==
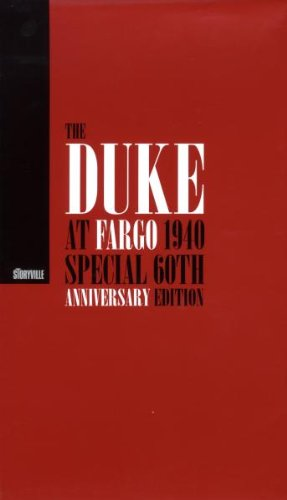
Cover of 60th Anniversary edition

The album was released on three LP records by Book-of-the Month Records as Duke Ellington at Fargo, 1940. The record sides were sequenced for use with a record changer (1/6, 2/5, 3/4). This version was also issued with different cover art as Duke Ellington at Fargo, 1940 Live by Jazz Heritage. Since the album was released in 1978, it has been reissued in varying combinations with different album covers.

In 1990, the first digital release of the concert (on two CDs) was by Vintage Jazz. On 23 July 1996, these discs were released again as Fargo 1940 on Jazz Classics. On 3 April 2001, another CD release with additional tracks was made on Storyville as The Duke at Fargo, 1940: Special 60th Anniversary Edition. Both CDs of this release were also included in Storyville's 2006 eight-CD box set, The Duke Box as discs two & three. In 2002, a two-CD release similar to the Storyville one was made on Definitive as the Complete Legendary Fargo Concert.

== Critical reception ==
Professional ratings
Review scores
Source	Rating
Allmusic	5/5 stars
The Penguin Guide to Jazz Recordings	👑
DownBeat	5/5 stars

Allmusic.com reviewer Scott Yanow posits that "there was no better orchestra at the time, and rarely since". JazzTimes writer Harvey Siders says, "the real star, of course, is the band, with its organized chaos, its sophistication, its jungle heat, its ability to respond to the improvisational genius of Duke". A Storyville Records reviewer argues "the Fargo performance still resonates as one of the greatest concert recordings in all of jazz, on a par with Benny Goodman at Carnegie, Coltrane at the Vanguard, or Ellington at Newport in 1956". The Penguin Guide to Jazz Recordings awarded the album four stars, its maximum rating, plus a special "crown" rating. DownBeat awarded the original Book-of-the-Month release 5 stars. Reviewer John McDonough wrote the recording "gives the most vivid and intimate aural picture of the band that I know of anywhere, including the more perfectly realized Victor recordings."

== Track listing ==
=== Side 1 ===
1. "The Mooche"
2. "Sepia Panorama (theme)"
3. "Ko-Ko"
4. "There Shall Be No Night"
5. "Pussy Willow"
6. "Chatterbox"
7. "Mood Indigo"

=== Side 2 ===
1. "Harlem Air Shaft"
2. "The Ferryboat Serenade"
3. "Warm Valley"
4. "Stompy Jones"
5. "Bojangles"
6. "You Took Advantage of Me"
7. "Rumpus in Richmond"

=== Side 3 ===
1. "The Flaming Sword"
2. "Never No Lament"
3. "Clarinet Lament"
4. "Slap Happy"
5. "Sepia Panorama"

=== Side 4 ===
1. "Boy Meets Horn"
2. " 'Way Down Yonder in New Orleans"
3. "Oh, Babe! Maybe Someday"
4. "Five O'Clock Whistle"
5. "Rockin' in Rhythm"
6. "Sophisticated Lady"

=== Side 5 ===
1. "Cotton Tail"
2. "Whispering Grass"
3. "Conga Brava"
4. "I Never Felt This Way Before"
5. "Across the Track Blues"

=== Side 6 ===
1. "Honeysuckle Rose"
2. "Wham"
3. "Star Dust"
4. "Rose of the Rio Grande"
5. "St. Louis Blues"

== 60th anniversary edition track listing ==
=== CD 1 ===
1. "It's Glory" (Duke Ellington) – (0:47)
2. "The Mooche" (Irving Mills, Duke Ellington) – (5:23)
3. "The Sheik of Araby" (Harry B. Smith, Ted Snyder, Francis Wheeler) – (2:55)
4. "Sepia Panorama" (Duke Ellington) – (1:15)
5. "Ko-Ko" (Duke Ellington) – (2:22)
6. "There Shall Be No Night" (Abner Silver, Gladys Shelley) – (3:09)
7. "Pussy Willow" (Duke Ellington) – (4:34)
8. "Chatterbox" (Rex Stewart, Irving Mills, Duke Ellington) – (3:22)
9. "Mood Indigo" (Irving Mills, Barney Bigard, Duke Ellington) – (4:15)
10. "Harlem Air Shaft" (Duke Ellington) – (3:42)
11. "Ferryboat Serenade" (Harold Adamson, Eldo Di Lazzaro) – (1:33)
12. "Warm Valley" (Duke Ellington) – (3:36)
13. "Stompy Jones" (Duke Ellington) – (2:42)
14. "Chloe" (Gus Kahn, Neil Moret [Charles N. Daniels]) – (4:03)
15. "Bojangles" (Duke Ellington) – (4:02)
16. "On the Air" (Duke Ellington) – (5:08)
17. "Rumpus in Richmond" (Duke Ellington) – (2:36)
18. "Chaser" (Duke Ellington) – (0:15)
19. "The Sidewalks of New York" (James W. Blake, Charles B. Lawlor) – (5:07)
20. "The Flaming Sword" (Duke Ellington) – (4:59)
21. "Never No Lament (Don't Get Around Much Anymore)" (Duke Ellington, Bob Russell) – (4:21)
22. "Caravan" (Irving Mills, Duke Ellington, Juan Tizol) – (3:44)
23. "Clarinet Lament (Barney's Concerto)" (Barney Bigard, Duke Ellington) – (3:28)

=== CD 2 ===
1. "Slap Happy" (Duke Ellington) – (3:24)
2. "Sepia Panorama" (Duke Ellington) – (5:11)
3. "Boy Meets Horn" (Rex Stewart, Duke Ellington) – (5:36)
4. "Way Down Yonder in New Orleans" (Henry Creamer, Turner Layton) – (1:27)
5. "Oh, Babe! Maybe Someday" (Duke Ellington) – (2:17)
6. "Five O'Clock Whistle" (Josef Myrow, Kim Gannon, Gene Irwin) – (2:00)
7. "Fanfare" (Duke Ellington) – (0:32)
8. "The Call of the Canyon/All This and Heaven Too" (Billy Hill, Eddie DeLange, Jimmy Van Heusen) – (1:33)
9. "Rockin' in Rhythm" (Irving Mills, Harry Carney, Duke Ellington) – (4:54)
10. "Sophisticated Lady" (Irving Mills, Duke Ellington, Mitchell Parish) – (5:11)
11. "Cotton Tail" (Duke Ellington) – (3:06)
12. "Whispering Grass" (Fred Fisher) – (2:29)
13. "Conga Brava" (Duke Ellington, Juan Tizol) – (4:07)
14. "I Never Felt This Way Before" (Al Dubin, Duke Ellington) – (5:29)
15. "Across the Track Blues" (Duke Ellington) – (6:44)
16. "Honeysuckle Rose" (Fats Waller, Andy Razaf) – (5:08)
17. "Wham" (Eddie Durham, Taps Miller) – (2:49)
18. "Stardust" (Hoagy Carmichael, Mitchell Parish) – (4:15)
19. "Rose of the Rio Grande" (Harry Warren, Ross Gorman, Edgar Leslie) – (3:33)
20. "St. Louis Blues" (W. C. Handy) – (5:39)
21. "Warm Valley" (Duke Ellington) – (0:50)
22. "God Bless America" (Irving Berlin) – (0:28)

== Personnel ==
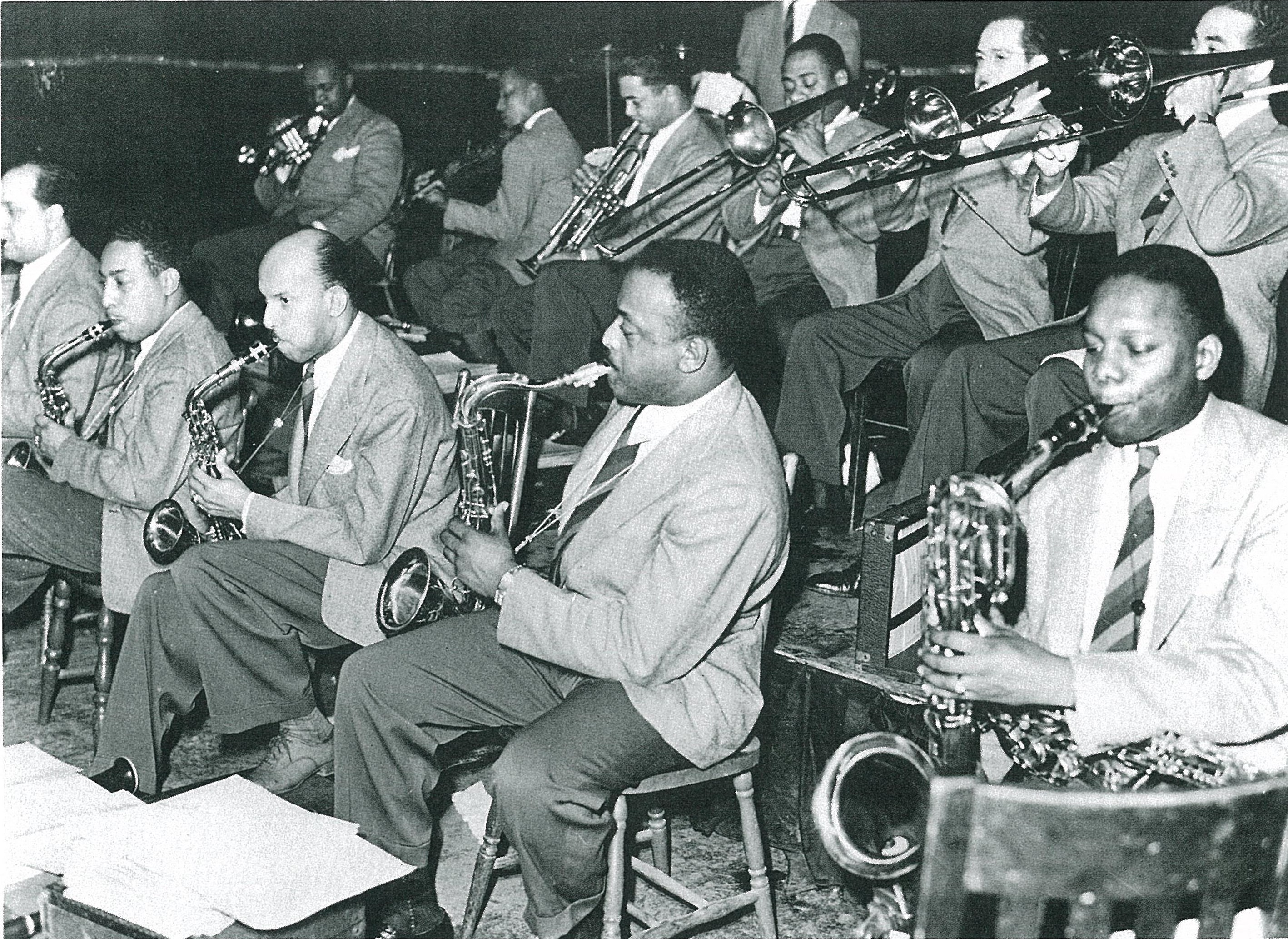
From right: Lawrence Brown, Harry Carney, Juan Tizol, Tricky Sam Nanton, Sonny Greer, Ben Webster, Wallace Jones, Ray Nance, Otto Hardwick, Rex Stewart, Johnny Hodges, Barney Bigard; photograph taken at the Crystal Ballroom in Fargo, North Dakota, November 7, 1940, by Jack Towers

- Duke Ellington – piano
- Johnny Hodges, Otto Hardwick – alto saxophone
- Ben Webster – tenor saxophone
- Harry Carney – baritone saxophone
- Barney Bigard – clarinet
- Rex Stewart – cornet
- Ray Nance, Wallace Jones – trumpet
- Tricky Sam Nanton, Juan Tizol, Lawrence Brown – trombone
- Jimmy Blanton – bass
- Fred Guy – guitar
- Sonny Greer – drums
- Ivie Anderson, Herb Jeffries – vocals
