= Roger Zwieg =

- Born: Roger Carl Zwieg; 26 July 1942; Watertown, South Dakota, U.S.
- Died: 9 January 2015 (aged 72); Houston, Texas, U.S.
- Resting place: Calvary Lutheran Church, Rural Bradley, South Dakota
- Education: Watertown High School (1960); South Dakota State University (1964)
- Occupations: Flight instructor test pilot
- Years active: 1964 – 2012
- Employer(s): United States Air Force; Louisiana Air National Guard; NASA; Orion Air Group

Roger Carl Zwieg (26 July 1942 – 9 January 2015) was an American National Aeronautics and Space Administration (NASA) flight instructor and test pilot.

== Early life and education ==
He was born in Watertown, South Dakota, graduated from South Dakota State College in 1964, and was commissioned to the United States Air Force (USAF).

== NASA career ==
He joined NASA in 1970, working at the Johnson Space Center in Houston, Texas.

Whilst in the USAF, Zwieg was stationed at Reese Air Force Base in Lubbock, Texas as a flight instructor.

During his first years at NASA, Zwieg flew in support of the Apollo program, Skylab, and the Apollo–Soyuz Test Project. Later, he became the primary flight instructor for astronauts training in the Shuttle Training Aircraft, a Gulfstream II modified to mimic the flight characteristics of the Space Shuttle. He trained every astronaut who would ever pilot a shuttle. Roger held a world's record for flight time in the T-38 of over 10,498 hours.

== Retirement ==
After retiring from NASA in 2010, Roger Zwieg continued to work as a test pilot for various companies including Northrop Grumman. Roger held an Airline Transport Pilot Licence, and accumulated over 29,500 hours flying more than 150 different aircraft during a half-century career. He was diagnosed with cancer in 2012 and died in 2015.
