= Maurice Peress =

American conductor, educator and author (1930–2017)

- Born: March 18, 1930; Manhattan, New York
- Died: December 31, 2017 (aged 87) Manhattan, New York
- Genre: Classical
- Occupations: Conductor, educator, author

Maurice Peress (March 18, 1930 – December 31, 2017) was an American orchestra conductor, educator and author.

After serving as assistant conductor of the New York Philharmonic under Leonard Bernstein beginning in 1961, Peress went on to stand as leader of the orchestra in Corpus Christi, Texas in 1962. In 1965, he conducted the Naumburg Orchestral Concerts, in the Naumburg Bandshell, Central Park, in the summer series. In 1970, he also became leader for two years of the Austin Symphony Orchestra. In 1974, he left Texas to take over the Kansas City Philharmonic, where he remained until 1980. He conducted Leonard Bernstein's musical theatre work MASS in 1971, 1973 and 2014.

Peress also extensively conducted orchestras internationally, including the Hong Kong Philharmonic Orchestra in 1980, the Vienna State Opera in 1981, the Orchestra dell'Accademia Nazionale di Santa Cecilia of Rome in 1988, the Brno Orkester of the Czech Republic in 1997, the FOK Orkester at the Prague Spring Festival in 1988, the Shanghai Radio and Television Orchestra in 1996–97, the Melbourne Symphony Orchestra in 1998, and the Barbican Centre Orchestra in London in 1999. In the 2000s, he toured extensively in China, leading the Shanghai Opera Orchestra, the China National Symphony in Beijing, and the Shenzhen Symphony. From 2010 to 2014, he served as the music director and conductor of the New Britain Symphony Orchestra in New Britain, Connecticut.

In 1984, he became a professor at the Aaron Copland School of Music at Queens College. Though he had himself earned a Bachelor of Arts degree from New York University, he established a Master of Arts degree in conducting there. He also conducted the Queens College Orchestra.

Peress was the author of Dvorak to Duke Ellington: A Conductor Explores America's Music and Its African American Roots, published in 2004 by Oxford University Press. Peress worked with Ellington in revising the ending of Black, Brown and Beige, which he debuted with the American Jazz Orchestra in 1988. He also worked on the arrangement of Ellington's opera Queenie Pie, that was not completed before Ellington's death.

Maurice Peress died in Manhattan on December 31, 2017 and leaves three children, all in the arts: Lorca Peress, a theatrical director; Paul Peress, a composer and drummer; and Anika Paris (née Peress), a singer/songwriter. All three children are from his first marriage in 1955 to Gloria Vando, a poet and publisher.
