= Queenie Pie =

Unfinished opera by Duke Ellington

- Unfinished opera by Duke Ellington
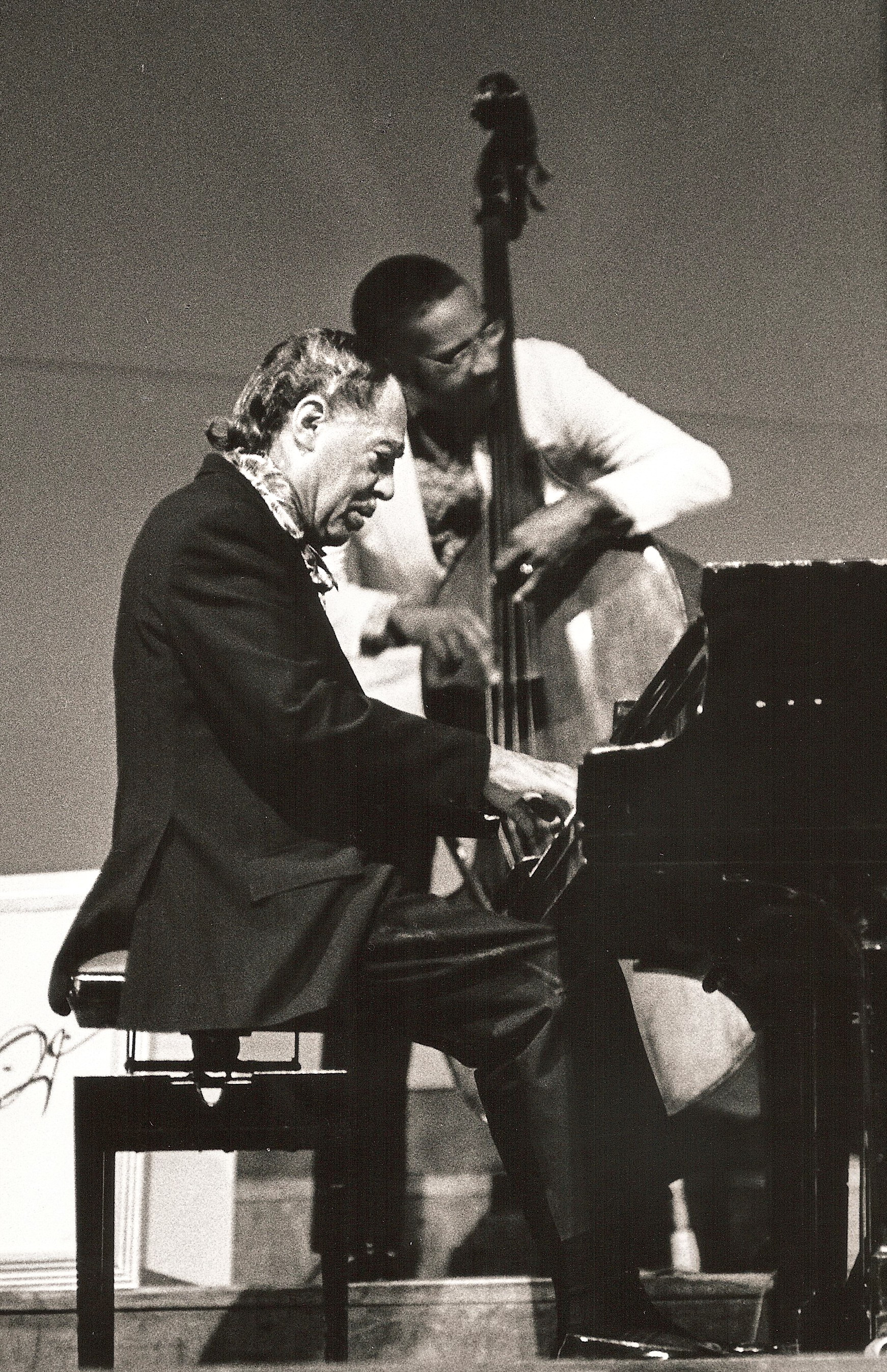
- Composer Duke Ellington in 1973
- Librettist: George C. Wolf
- Language: English

Queenie Pie is an unfinished opera by American jazz musician Duke Ellington. It tells a story of a Harlem beautician named Queenie Pie. Ellington referred to the opera as "opera comique", and worked on it from the 1930s until his death in 1974. The opera was later staged in 1986, but the arrangements were lost. In 2007 musician Marc T. Gaspard Bolin recreated the opera that was staged in the Oakland Opera Theater.

== History ==
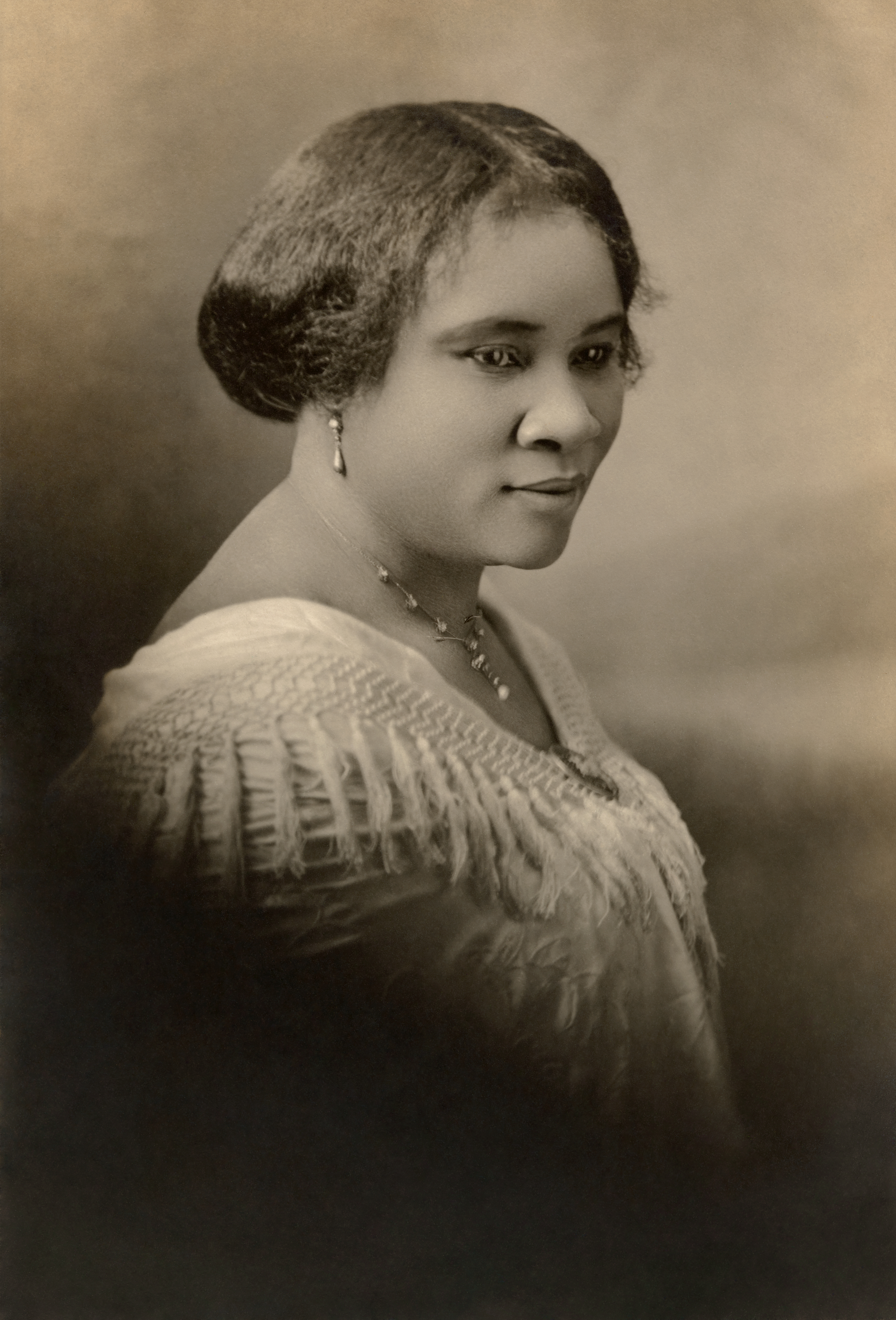
Madam C. J. Walker, prototype of Queenie Pie

Ellington first had an idea to write an opera about a Harlem beautician Madam C. J. Walker, a black millionaire, in 1930s. He started to work on a "street opera" in 1962, and got a commission from a New York's WNET TV station for an hour-long opera. In 1970 NET Opera commissioned Ellington to complete the opera. In 1971 Maurice Peress was hired to assist with arrangements; he worked with Ellington in 1972–1973. Ellington saw his opera as "opera comique", and had an idea "to 'interrupt' his television opera with commercials and news bulletins about Queenie's life".

If you are agreeable to the eye
Of your favorite guy
You can make him hit the sky ...
Just apply some Queenie Pie ...
And try, I mean, BUY.

Ellington was thinking about the personnel, and chose Lena Horne for Queenie, Maurice Peress as a conductor for Ellington Orchestra, "supplemented with French horns, a harp, and a small string section", and himself as a narrator.

Peress gives one piece of a dialogue that Ellington wrote for the opera:

Queenie: Li'l Daddy, this NUCLI? Will it make hair grow?
Li'l Daddy: Two inches a day.
Queenie: Will it make freckles go?
Li'l Daddy: Just wipe 'em away.
Queenie: Will it remove a wrinkle?
Li'l Daddy: A touch in a twinkle.
Queenie: What about a blister?
Li'l Daddy: She'd think her sweetheart kissed her.

Duke Ellington died on May 24, 1974, before the demo tape was recorded.

== Plot ==
The opera is about Queenie Pie, a black beautician named best in town, who is challenged by a lighter-skinned woman, Café O'Lay. Queenie's manager and lover, Holt Faye, falls in love with O'Lay, but she shoots and kills him in a quarrel. Queenie Pie then departs to a magic island, "in search of a magic flower, meets up with a king and a witch doctor and ultimately has reconciliation with Café O'Lay".

== Completion history ==
In the early 1980s, John A. Williams and the composer and flautist Leslie Burrs, with the agreement of Mercer Ellington, began collaborating on the completion of Queenie Pie. The project fell through, and the opera was eventually completed by other hands. Maurice Peress participated in staging the Queenie Pie on Broadway in 1986–1987. George C. Wolf wrote a libretto based on Ellington's notes. The 1986 arrangement was lost, but the opera was later recreated from notes and staged in 2008 by Marc T. Gaspard Bolin and the Oakland Opera Theater, and in 2014 by Long Beach Opera and Chicago Opera Theater.
