= Mildred Dixon =

Dancer, companion, and manager for Duke Ellington (1904–2001)

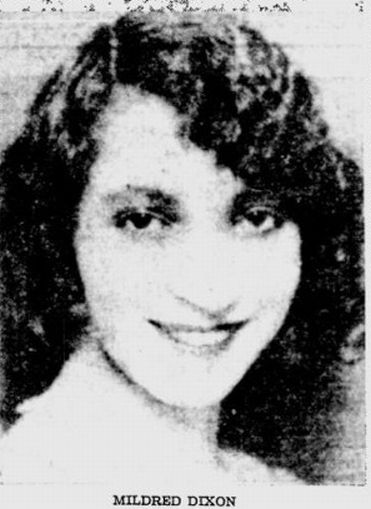
- Born: November 21, 1904; Boston, Massachusetts, U.S.
- Died: September 18, 2001 (aged 96)
- Occupations: Dancer; manager

Mildred Dixon (November 21, 1904 – September 18, 2001) was an American dancer who danced at the Cotton Club in Harlem, New York City. She became a longtime companion of composer and musician Duke Ellington, and manager of his company. She was born in Boston, Massachusetts, to parents from Africville, Nova Scotia. She became a dancer and moved to New York in the mid-1920s, where she became known as part of the dance couple, "Mildred and Henri".

== Early life ==
Mildred Dixon was born and grew up in Boston, Massachusetts, where she attended local schools. Her parents had emigrated from Africville, Nova Scotia. They were descendants of Black Loyalists—freed American slaves who had been relocated to the area after the American Revolutionary War by British forces, who had promised them freedom. She and Ellington visited her extended family in Africville throughout her life.

South Boston had a thriving Black community, which included descendants of freedmen and free black people who had migrated from the South after the Civil War, for better opportunities in the North. She learned tap dance and other forms of stage dancing.

Dixon moved to New York to work as a dancer. In the mid-1920s, during the Harlem Renaissance, she joined the Cotton Club in Harlem, a premiere nightspot in the city. She gained renown together with Henri Wessell; they were a dance couple known as "Mildred and Henri". "Mildred and Henri" have been described as one of the "most exciting dance acts" in America. She met Ellington on December 4, 1927, the first night he and his orchestra played at the club. It became his venue for years. They worked together on numerous productions including: "It's the blackberries", "Springbirds" and "Pepper-pot Revue".

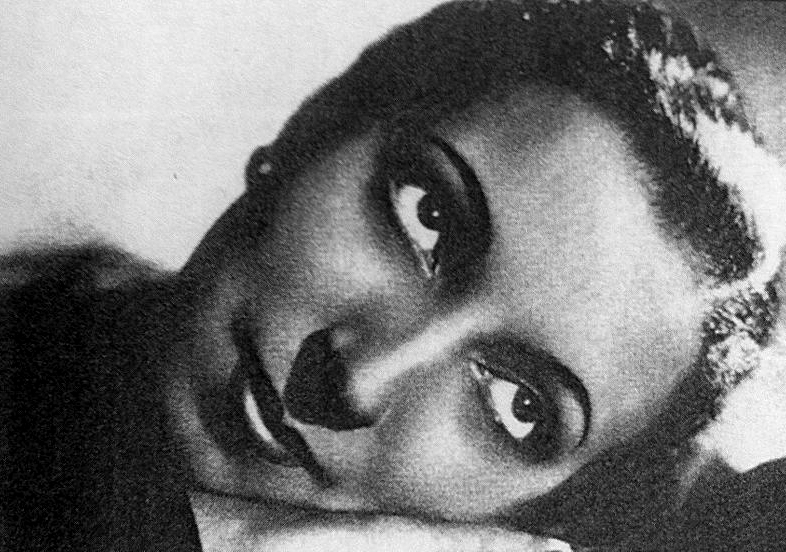
Mildred Dixon, companion of Duke Ellington

They started a relationship in 1928 and, in 1930, Dixon and Ellington moved in together at 381 Edgecombe Avenue, Apt. 142, Sugar Hill, Manhattan. Their household included Ellington's son and his parents. While Dixon was Ellington's companion (1928–1938), she worked as manager of his company Tempo Music. During this decade, Ellington wrote his most famous works: "It Don't Mean a Thing (If It Ain't Got That Swing)" (1932); "Mood Indigo" (1930), "Sophisticated Lady" (1933), "Solitude" (1934), and "In a Sentimental Mood" (1935).

When Dixon moved in with Ellington, his son Mercer Ellington was ten years old. Mercer later wrote in his biography of his father that he considered Dixon his mother, as he lived with her for a decade. Mercer wrote, "She had innate class comparable to Ellington's own."

Their relationship ended after he became involved with Beatrice "Evie" Ellis. She later went on to work in music publishing.

== Legacy ==
- Mildred is the namesake of Ellington's song "Sophisticated Lady" (1933).
- Joe Sealy's Africville Stories in Music contains the song "Duke’s in Town", which is about the visits Ellington and Dixon made to Africville.
- Dixon's cousin from Africville, Clara Carvery Adams, is the namesake of Duke Ellington's song "Clara".
