= The Miracle of St. Anne =

- Directed by: Orson Welles
- Written by: Orson Welles
- Starring: Marcel Achard; Georges Baume; Frédéric O'Brady; Maurice Bessy
- Running time: Unknown
- Language: English

The Miracle of St. Anne was a short film, now lost, made by Orson Welles. It served as a prelude to the play The Unthinking Lobster, which was written and directed by Welles as part of a collection of two one-act plays (with Time Runs…) performed under the banner title of The Blessed and the Damned. The film consisted of the rushes (dailies) for a Biblical epic that was a film-within-the-play.

== Production ==
The Blessed and the Damned premiered in Paris at the Théâtre Edouard VII and attracted positive notices. Le Monde described it as "a stage masterpiece"), but the show was a financial flop. Jonathan Rosenbaum speculates its failure was due to the language barrier (the play and film were in English). After the play's failure in Paris, Welles toured Germany with it.

Welles described The Miracle of St. Anne to his biographer Peter Bogdanovich:

The Unthinking Lobster takes place in Hollywood while the town is in the grip of a cycle of religious movies. On one set an Italian neorealist is making the story of a saint like Bernadette who worked miracles and cured the sick. He has just fired the star and replaced her with a secretary from the typists' pool because she seems to have a more spiritual quality. As it turns out, he's only too right. The scene they're shooting has a lot of cripples in it, and the Italian has insisted that, in the interest of believability, on the first day they must be real. So a lot of malformed, miserable people are brought in by the casting department. She blesses them and - behold! - they throw away their crutches - they are cured! She is a saint. So Hollywood becomes the new Lourdes. People go on their knees through the gates of MGM. Little pieces of film are sold as holy amulets...Except for the trade in sacred relics, business is terrible. The industry is only saved by the arrival of an archangel who goes into a conference with the studio heads, and makes a deal with them: heaven is prepared to suspend any further miracles in Hollywood if, in exchange, Hollywood stop making religious pictures."

Welles later hoped to realise the whole of The Unthinking Lobster as a full-length feature film, but it was never made. Between 1948 and 1952, Welles' cinematic efforts were focussed on his film adaptation of Othello.

The Miracle of St. Anne was filmed in the park of Buttes Chaumont, and Welles described the film thus: "It's got a lot of distinguished Paris celebrities [in it] … It's not supposed to be a very good film — it's just rushes. The play begins in a projection room where they're running rushes."

The only known copy of the film was owned by Welles, and has long been believed to be lost, although a short clip of the footage is in circulation among private collectors.

The second one-act play, Time Runs..., was a retelling of Faust, with Welles as Doctor Faustus and the young Eartha Kitt as Helen of Troy.

After the failure of The Blessed and the Damned in Paris, Welles dropped Time Runs... from the show and toured Germany with The Unthinking Lobster, which was performed in Act I, and Act II consisted of numerous scenes and sketches, including a heavily condensed version of The Importance of Being Earnest.

== Publication ==
The Unthinking Lobster was published in Paris in 1952, paired off with a two-act play written by Welles, Fair Warning (which Welles never performed, but which had several staging in Ireland). Neither of these plays was ever published in English. Time Runs... was never published at all.

== See also ==
- List of lost films

== Bibliography ==
- Jonathan Rosenbaum (ed.), Orson Welles and Peter Bogdanovich, This is Orson Welles (DeCapo Press, New York, 1992 [rev. 1998 ed.]) pp. 405–7, 411
- Orson Welles [trans. Serge Greffet], Miracle à Hollywood - A bon entendeur (La Table Ronde, Paris, 1952) - French-language edition of two plays written by Welles; Miracle à Hollywood was a French title for The Unthinking Lobster
