= Jack Towers =

Jazz audio engineer (1914 - 2010)

- Born: November 15, 1914; Bradley, South Dakota
- Died: December 23, 2010 (aged 96)
- Occupation: Radio Broadcaster

Jack Towers (November 15, 1914 – December 23, 2010) was in charge of radio broadcasting at the U.S. Department of Agriculture from 1952 to 1974 and became a noted remastering engineer of musical recordings after his retirement.

== Biography ==
Jack Howard Towers was born in Bradley, South Dakota in the United States.

After graduating from South Dakota State College, he became a cooperative extension service worker at the South Dakota State College extension. He moved to Washington in 1941 to work for the U.S. Department of Agriculture, served in the Army from 1942 to 1946, and then returned to the USDA.

Towers was in charge of radio broadcasting at the USDA from 1952 to 1974, where he developed agriculture-related programs for broadcast on American radio networks. He retired from the USDA in 1974 and what had been a hobby of remastering rare recordings, primarily of jazz groups, became a second career. He used techniques such as manually scraping imperfections such as pops and hisses from reel-to-reel tapes with an X-Acto knife.

He lived in Hyattsville, Maryland and, from 1991, in Ashton until he died at age 96 in 2010 in nearby Rockville from Parkinson's disease. He was survived by his wife of 70 years, Rhoda Sime Towers, and two daughters and was predeceased by a son.

== Musical work ==
Towers has been called an "audio magician" for his restoring, remastering, and producing of vintage jazz recordings.

His first notable work was when, as young extension service employee, he and fellow jazz aficionado Richard Burris made an amateur live recording of Duke Ellington and His Orchestra at a concert in Fargo, North Dakota in 1940. Towers saw Ellington live in Sioux Falls, South Dakota, and, when Burris learned Ellington would be in Fargo in 1940, he asked the William Morris Agency, Ellington's agent, for permission to record the session. Permission was granted to the two provided they receive permission from Ellington and the venue's manager before the show. Towers recounted to the Washington Post that, "We had a disc recorder that the extension service used for recording farm programs for agricultural colleges. It was advanced equipment — up to snuff".

The recording was not officially released but circulated in bootleg form from the 1960s. In the 1970s, Towers made a reproduction of the recording from areas of the groove that were less worn. In 1978, Towers' master of Duke Ellington at Fargo, 1940 Live was finally officially released by Book-of-the-Month Records as a Book-of-the-Month Club selection. Towers later said, "When Dick and I recorded this Fargo performance, we did it just for the excitement and pleasure of it all. We had no idea that people all over the world would be listening to it 60 years later."

In 1980, At Fargo won the Grammy Award for Best Jazz Instrumental Performance, Big Band at the 22nd Grammy Awards. The original acetate disks of this recording have since been donated to the Archives Center of the Smithsonian Institution's National Museum of American History.

In the late 1980s and 1990s, Towers restored recordings such as The Complete Dean Benedetti Recordings of Charlie Parker, a series of Parker made by fellow saxophonist Dean Benedetti in 1947 and 1948 released on Mosaic Records. Towers also remastered works by Count Basie, Benny Goodman, Glenn Miller and other notable jazz performers.

Following Towers' death, Patricia Willard, a former jazz consultant to the Library of Congress said, "It was amazing to watch him. What Jack achieved in sound restoration was beyond what anybody did before and, I think, since."
