= Duke Ellington Park =

Park in Washington, D.C., U.S.

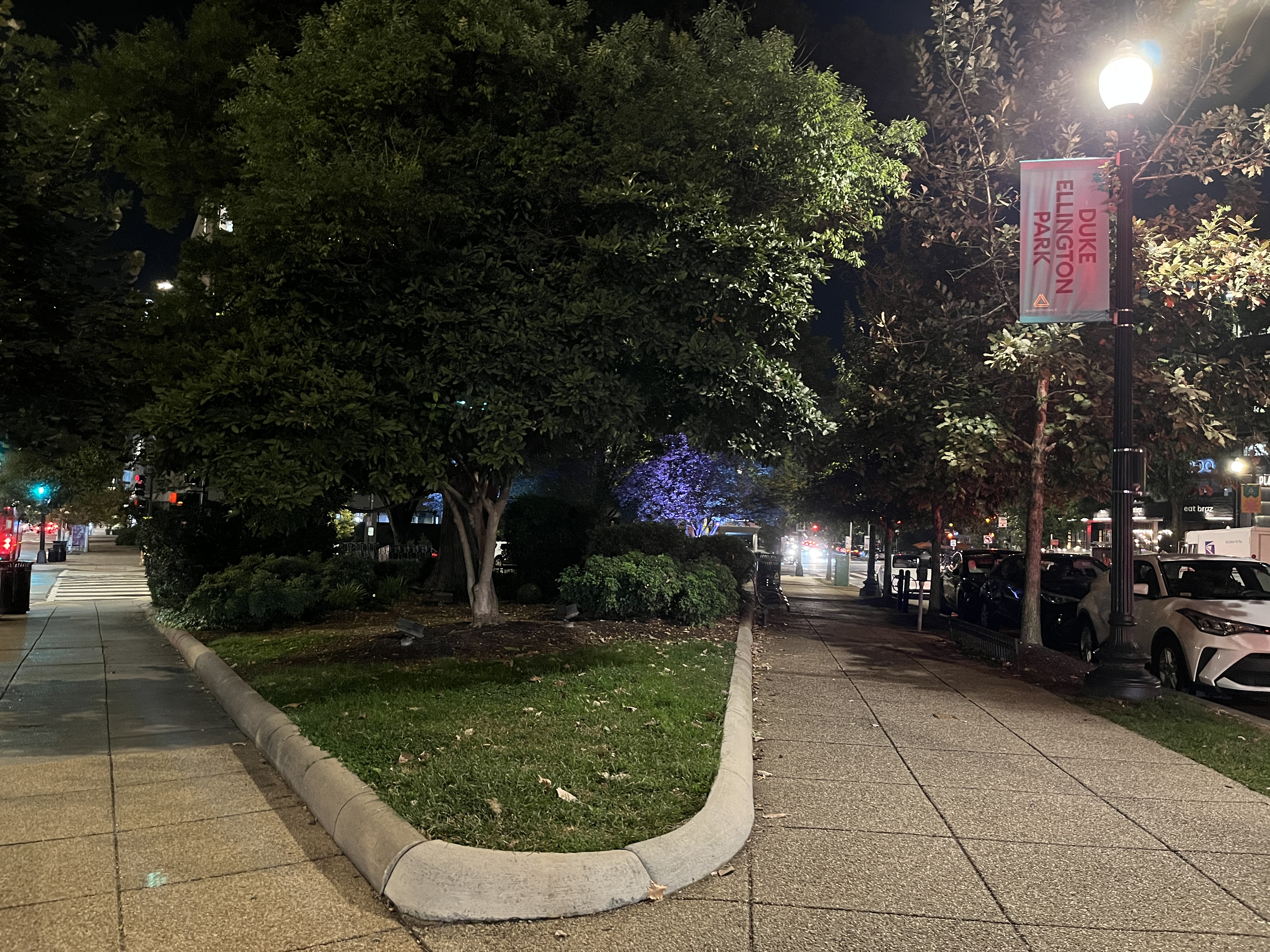
- The park at night, 2024
- Interactive map of Duke Ellington Park
- Location: Washington, D.C., United States
- Coordinates: 38°54′21″N 77°02′49″W

Duke Ellington Park is a park in Washington, D.C., United States. It is located at the intersection of M Street NW, 21st Street NW, and New Hampshire Avenue NW.
