= Sophisticated Lady =

1932 composition by Duke Ellington, lyrics by Irving Mills and Mitchell Parish

Single by Duke Ellington and his Orchestra
- Released: 1933
- Recorded: February 15, 1933
- Genre: Jazz
- Songwriter: Duke Ellington

"Sophisticated Lady" is a jazz standard, composed as an instrumental in 1932 by Duke Ellington.

== Background ==
Additional credit is given to publisher Irving Mills whose words were added to the song by Mitchell Parish. The words met with approval from Ellington, who described them as "wonderful—but not entirely fitted to my original conception". That original conception was inspired by three of Ellington's grade-school teachers. "They taught all winter and toured Europe in the summer. To me that spelled sophistication." It has also been suggested that the title refers to his longtime companion, Mildred Dixon.

Lawrence Brown, the trombone player in Ellington's band at the time, claimed that he was responsible for the main hook in the A section of the tune. Ellington paid him $15 for his contribution, but he was never officially credited.

Duke Ellington and His Orchestra introduced "Sophisticated Lady" in 1933 with an instrumental recording of the song that featured solos by Toby Hardwick on alto sax, Barney Bigard on clarinet, Lawrence Brown on trombone and Ellington on piano. The recording entered the charts on 27 May 1933 and rose to number three.

Singer Adelaide Hall recorded with Ellington in 1927, 1932, and 1933, but only recorded two versions of "Sophisticated Lady", in 1944 (with Phil Green And His Rhythm) and in 1976, on her album Hall of Ellington. The song appeared on the soundtrack of the 1989/90 documentary celebrating her life entitled Sophisticated Lady. In his autobiography Music Is My Mistress, Ellington writes that "George Gershwin once told Oscar Levant that he wished he had written the bridge to Sophisticated Lady, and that made me very proud". In June 2026, CBS News included the song in its list of the 250 essential American songs of the past 250 years.

== Other recordings ==
- Tony Bennett - Cheek to Cheek (2014)
- Sylvia Brooks – Dangerous Liaisons (2009)
- Casa Loma Orchestra – 1933
- Rosemary Clooney - Blue Rose (1956)
- Chick Corea – Chick Corea Akoustic Band (1989)
- Larry Coryell – Toku Do
- Billy Eckstine – 1947
- Duke Ellington – Masterpieces by Ellington (1950)
- Dave Grusin - Homage to Duke (1993)
- Adelaide Hall – Adelaide Hall Live at the Riverside Studios
- Earl Hines - Earl Hines Plays Duke Ellington (1971)
- Billie Holiday – All or Nothing at All (1956)
- Stan Kenton – Kenton with Voices (1957)
- Jeanne Lee on Archie Shepp's album Blasé (1969)
- Abbey Lincoln - Golden Lady (1981)
- Al Jarreau - 1965 (1982)
- Marcus Miller – Silver Rain
- Mulgrew Miller and Niels-Henning Ørsted Pedersen – The Duets (1999)
- Charles Mingus – The Great Concert of Charles Mingus (1964)
- Thelonious Monk – Thelonious Monk Plays Duke Ellington (1955)
- Spud Murphy – Gone with the Woodwinds (1955)
- Jaco Pastorius - Invitation (1983)
- Don Redman – 1933
- Boz Scaggs – But Beautiful (2003)
- Ray Stevens - Melancholy Fescue (2021)
- Art Tatum – 1933 and 1954
- Toots Thielemans with Fred Hersch – Only Trust Your Heart (1988)
- The Vanguard Jazz Orchestra – Can I Persuade You? (2001)
- Sarah Vaughan - After Hours (1961)
- Caetano Veloso - A Foreign Sound - digital download edition (2004)
- Cécile McLorin Salvant - With Every Breath I Take (2026)

== See also ==
- List of 1930s jazz standards
