= The Blessed and the Damned (Orson Welles) =

1950 stage plays by Orson Welles

The Blessed and the Damned is the title of a program of two one-act plays staged by Orson Welles in 1950, which he also wrote and starred in. Le Monde called the show a masterpiece of scenic art. The performance included filmed elements.

Eartha Kitt and Hilton Edwards were also featured players, as were Suzanne Cloutier, Jennifer Howard, and Pittsburgh-born Jamie Schmitt, prior to adopting his better-known stage name, Jamie Smith.

A photo of Welles and others discussing work on the show exists.

The two plays were Time Runs and The Unthinking Lobster. Indiana University's Lilly Library has a playbill for the shows. The University of Michigan's archives acquired a script for The Unthinking Lobster.

== Cast ==
Unless otherwise indicated, credits derived from This Is Orson Welles.

=== The Unthinking Lobster ===
- Miss Pratt – Suzanne Cloutier as Miss Pratt
- Roland Zitz – Jamie Smith (as Jamie Schmitt)
- Jake Behoovian – Orson Welles
- Leander Place – George Lloyd
- Archduke – Frederick O'Brady
- Archbishop – Hilton Edwards

=== Time Runs ===
- Dr. John Faustus – Orson Welles
- Mephistopheles – Hilton Edwards
- Helen/Chorus – Eartha Kitt
- First man – Lee Zimmer
- Woman – Jennifer Howard

== See also ==
- The Miracle of St. Anne, a short film that was part of the performance
