= Bradley, South Dakota =

- Town
- Location in Clark County and the state of South Dakota
- Coordinates: 45°05′25″N 97°38′31″W
- Country: United States
- State: South Dakota
- County: Clark
- Incorporated: 1902

Area
  - Total: 0.24 sq mi (0.63 km^{2})
  - Land: 0.24 sq mi (0.63 km^{2})
  - Water: 0 sq mi (0.00 km^{2})
- Elevation: 1,821 ft (555 m)

Population (2020)
  - Total: 65
  - Density: 265.1/sq mi (102.37/km^{2})
- Time zone: UTC-6 (Central (CST))
  - Summer (DST): UTC-5 (CDT)
- ZIP code: 57217
- Area code: 605
- FIPS code: 46-06660
- GNIS feature ID: 1267291

Bradley is a town in Clark County, South Dakota, United States. The population was 65 at the 2020 census. A post office opened in Bradley in 1887.

== Geography ==
According to the United States Census Bureau, the town has a total area of 0.25 square miles (0.65 km^{2}), all land.

== History ==
Bradley, South Dakota is named after E.R. Bradley, who rescued a railroad chief engineer from a brawl in the town.

== Notable person ==
- Jack Towers, radio engineer

== Demographics ==
Historical population
Census	Pop.	Note	%±
1910	351		—
1920	368		4.8%
1930	291		−20.9%
1940	311		6.9%
1950	226		−27.3%
1960	188		−16.8%
1970	157		−16.5%
1980	135		−14.0%
1990	117		−13.3%
2000	112		−4.3%
2010	72		−35.7%
2020	65		−9.7%
U.S. Decennial Census

=== 2010 census ===
As of the census of 2010, there were 72 people, 32 households, and 23 families residing in the town. The population density was 288.0 inhabitants per square mile (111.2/km^{2}). There were 53 housing units at an average density of 212.0 per square mile (81.9/km^{2}). The racial makeup of the town was 100.0% White.

There were 32 households, of which 34.4% had children under the age of 18 living with them, 56.3% were married couples living together, 9.4% had a female householder with no husband present, 6.3% had a male householder with no wife present, and 28.1% were non-families. 21.9% of all households were made up of individuals, and 6.2% had someone living alone who was 65 years of age or older. The average household size was 2.25 and the average family size was 2.52.

The median age in the town was 43.3 years. 20.8% of residents were under the age of 18; 4.3% were between the ages of 18 and 24; 30.6% were from 25 to 44; 33.4% were from 45 to 64; and 11.1% were 65 years of age or older. The gender makeup of the town was 48.6% male and 51.4% female.

=== 2000 census ===
As of the census of 2000, there were 112 people, 44 households, and 34 families residing in the town. The population density was 460.8 inhabitants per square mile (177.9/km^{2}). There were 69 housing units at an average density of 283.9 per square mile (109.6/km^{2}). The racial makeup of the town was 96.43% White, 0.89% Pacific Islander, and 2.68% from two or more races.

There were 44 households, out of which 27.3% had children under the age of 18 living with them, 59.1% were married couples living together, 13.6% had a female householder with no husband present, and 22.7% were non-families. 22.7% of all households were made up of individuals, and 13.6% had someone living alone who was 65 years of age or older. The average household size was 2.55 and the average family size was 2.91.

In the town, the population was spread out, with 27.7% under the age of 18, 8.0% from 18 to 24, 25.9% from 25 to 44, 14.3% from 45 to 64, and 24.1% who were 65 years of age or older. The median age was 38 years. For every 100 females, there were 80.6 males. For every 100 females age 18 and over, there were 97.6 males.

The median income for a household in the town was $23,750, and the median income for a family was $32,500. Males had a median income of $28,125 versus $21,875 for females. The per capita income for the town was $11,300. There were 12.5% of families and 10.0% of the population living below the poverty line, including no under eighteens and 13.5% of those over 64.
