= Charlie Irvis =

American jazz trombonist (1899–1939)

- Born: May 6, 1899; New York City, New York, U.S.
- Died: c. 1939 (aged 39–40) New York City, New York, U.S.
- Genres: Jazz
- Instrument: Trombone

Charlie Irvis (May 6, 1899 – 1939) was an American jazz trombonist, best known for performing in Duke Ellington's band.

== Career ==
Irvis played with Bubber Miley in his youth and then with blues singer Lucille Hegamin and her Blue Flame Syncopators from 1920 to 1921. Following this he played with Willie "The Lion" Smith and with Duke Ellington's orchestra (1924–1926), as well as recording occasionally with Clarence Williams between 1923 and 1927. Irvis, along with friends Miley and Tricky Sam Nanton, all contributed to the development of "jungle sounds" (growl effects) in trombone playing. After leaving Ellington's band, he recorded with Fats Waller (1927, 1929) and played with Charlie Johnson (1927–1928) and Jelly Roll Morton (1929–1930). Some of his latest recordings were in 1931 with Miley again, and shortly thereafter with Elmer Snowden.

== Personal life ==
After the early 1930s, Irvis apparently stopped playing, and died around 1939 in obscurity.
