= Black and tan (disambiguation) =

Black and tan may refer to:

- Black and Tan, a drink made by mixing dark and light beers, typically Guinness and Bass ale
- Black and Tans, a British paramilitary force, (formed to suppress the Irish War of Independence), who wore khaki and dark shirts.
  - Black and Tan War, alternative name for the Irish War of Independence
  - Come Out, Ye Black and Tans, an Irish rebel song referring to the Black and Tans
- Black-and-tan faction, a defunct biracial faction of the U.S. Republican Party
- Black and tan clubs, a type of club in the United States in the early 20th century catering to black and mixed-race persons
- Black and tan, coat (dog) coloration, sometimes used to specify a breed:
  - Austrian Black and Tan Hound
  - Black and Tan Coonhound
  - Black and Tan Terrier
  - English Toy Terrier (Black & Tan)
- Scarteen Hunt, a hunt pack of Kerry Beagles in Scarteen, County Limerick, Ireland
- Black and Tan (film), 1929 short film featuring Duke Ellington and his Cotton Club Orchestra
  - "Black and Tan Fantasy", song featured in the film
- "Black and Tan: A Crime of Fashion", season 2 episode of Psych
- Black & Tan, fictional movie in "Film Fest: Tears of a Clone" episode of Clone High
