= Black and Tan (film) =

1929 film

- The short film
- Directed by: Dudley Murphy
- Written by: Dudley Murphy
- Starring: Duke Ellington; Fredi Washington; Arthur Whetsel; Barney Bigard; Wellman Braud; Duke Ellington Orchestra; Tricky Sam Nanton
- Production company: RCA
- Distributed by: RKO Radio Pictures
- Release date: December 8, 1929
- Running time: 19 minutes
- Country: United States
- Language: English

Black and Tan (1929) is a musical short film written and directed by Dudley Murphy. The plot is about a couple in the performing arts; it is set during the contemporary Harlem Renaissance in New York City. It is the first film to feature Duke Ellington and His Orchestra performing as a jazz band, and was also the film debut of actress Fredi Washington. The film is thought to express the emergence of African-American artists in New York City during the Harlem Renaissance.

In 2015, the United States Library of Congress selected the film for preservation in the National Film Registry, finding it "culturally, historically, or aesthetically significant".

== Plot ==
The film begins with a scene showing Duke Ellington struggling to get bookings for his band. His finances are so tight that he can't make payments on his piano and apartment. Two men arrive to take possession of Duke's piano.

Ellington's wife (played by Fredi Washington) is a dancer. She has achieved acclaim beyond that of the band. She offers the movers ten dollars not to take the piano, but they refuse the payment. When she offers them gin (the film is set during the Prohibition era), they take it and leave, promising to say nothing of this and to claim nobody was at home when they came by.

After landing a dancing job at a club, Washington offers it as a venue to Ellington for his band. She says that she must be featured as the starring act, in order to land the contract offered by the club. Shown as deeply in love with Ellington, the dancer is revealed to have a heart condition that puts her at risk. Although warned to give up dancing, Washington assures the Duke that she is healthy enough to perform. But she dances to her collapse to Ellington's "Cotton Club Stomp." She later dies in their apartment as the band and a vocal chorus render Duke's new piece, "Black and Tan Fantasy".

== Cast ==
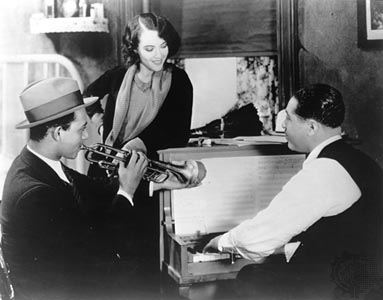
Main characters of the film in the opening scene, L to R - Arthur Whetsel, Fredi Washington, Duke Ellington

- Duke Ellington - This was the first film appearance for Duke Ellington and His Orchestra.
- Fredi Washington - She made her debut in this film.

Both used their own names in the film, although they played thinly masked "fictional" characters.

== Duke Ellington and His Orchestra ==
Duke Ellington's ensemble used myriad titles including The Washingtonians, The Harlem Footwarmers, Duke Ellington and His Cotton Club Orchestra, Duke Ellington and His Washingtonians, Duke Ellington And His Kentucky Club Orchestra, and Duke Ellington and His Orchestra. The first occasion for the final label was for a March 30, 1926 Gennett Session. (Gen 3291)

=== Notable orchestra members in the film ===
- Arthur Whetsel - primary member and jazz trumpeter. He performed in all of the musical compositions featured in the film.
- Barney Bigard - jazz tenor saxophonist and clarinetist.
- Wellman Braud - bassist.
- Tricky Sam Nanton - trombonist

== Production ==
Murphy used much of the same set and production crew as for his other 1929 film, St. Louis Blues, featuring Bessie Smith. He and his crew worked on both films concurrently.

Murphy collaborated with Ellington to allow his choice of what music would be played. The orchestra's performance of "Black and Tan Fantasy" in the film is very different from other traditional recordings. It is the only version in which Barney Bigard plays a solo using the clarinet as the melodic instrument during the song. To express the sadness of Fredi's death, Ellington uses music by the Hall Johnson choir.

== Reception and legacy ==
Black and Tan was inducted to the National Film Registry in 2015.

The film emphasizes the music and symbolism of African-American influence on jazz, the struggle and rage of people in 1920s Harlem, and some realities for African Americans, such as the Cotton Club being a place where they were hired to entertain, prepare food and drink, and serve, but were not accepted as customers. One of Ellington's notable compositions played in the film is "Black Beauty", which features Arthur Whetsel performing a trumpet solo as a melodic turn (in most of the recordings, Bubber Miley performs the solo). Bubber Miley had only recently left the band when the film was shot, and all the solos we hear and see Whetsel play were originally performed by Miley.
