= Hot Feet (disambiguation) =

Hot Feet is a jukebox musical featuring the music of Earth, Wind & Fire that was produced on Broadway in 2006.

Hot Feet may also refer to:

- IMP Society, a secret society at the University of Virginia, originally called Hot Feet

== See also ==
- Hot Feet Club, New York City nightclub from 1928 until 1933
- Hot Feet Boys, dance trio featuring Jimmy Mordecai
