= Dick Campbell (producer) =

American arts administrator (1903–1994)

- Born: Cornelius Coleridge Campbell; June 27, 1903; Beaumont, Texas, U.S.
- Died: December 20, 1994 (aged 91); New York City, U.S.
- Education: Paul Quinn College (1922–1926)
- Occupations: Arts administrator, theatre director, singer, dancer, actor
- Years active: 1926–1964
- Organization(s): Negro People's Theatre, Rose McClendon Players, Negro Actors Guild
- Known for: Advocate for black theatre performers during a period of segregation
- Notable work: Waiting for Lefty, On Striver's Row (director)
- Movement: Harlem Renaissance
- Spouse(s): Muriel Rahn (c. 1932–1961)(her death); Beryl (? – 1994) (his death)

Dick Campbell, born Cornelius Coleridge Campbell (June 27, 1903 – December 20, 1994), was a key figure in black theater during the Harlem Renaissance. While a successful performer in his own right, Campbell is best known as a tireless advocate for black actors in general. As a theater producer and director, he helped launch the careers of several black theater artists, including Ossie Davis, Frederick O'Neal, Loften Mitchell, Helen Martin, and Abram Hill.

He was a co-founder of the Negro People's Theatre in 1935 and the Rose McLendon Players in 1937, which soon produced only plays written by African Americans. That year, Campbell co-founded the Negro Actors Guild as well. His advocacy of the hiring of more blacks in TV included a boycott in 1955. From 1956 to 1964, he represented the State Department in Africa in its International Cultural Exchange Program. Later he was appointed to public affairs for the Human Resources Administration under Mayor John Lindsay and acted as a spokesperson for his anti-poverty programs. In 1972, he was co-founder of the Sickle Cell Disease Foundation of Greater New York and served as its executive director until his death.

== Childhood ==
Campbell was born Cornelius Coleridge Campbell on June 27, 1903, in Beaumont, Texas. Orphaned at the age of six, he was raised by his maternal grandmother, Pauline Snow. He worked as a janitor at his local high school, prior to attending Paul Quinn College in Waco, Texas, the first historically black college (HBCU) established west of the Mississippi River.

== Early career ==
In 1926, after completing his studies at Paul Quinn College, Campbell moved to Los Angeles to pursue a career as a performer in the entertainment industry. There he appeared as singer and a straight man in a series of vaudeville shows.

After two years, Campbell joined the touring Whitman Sisters' Show, which brought him to New York City. Beginning in 1929, he worked regularly in various stage productions in Harlem and on Broadway. In June of that year, Campbell appeared in the Fats Waller musical revue Hot Chocolates, which featured a young Louis Armstrong in his Broadway debut.

Campbell also appeared in Hot Rhythm, Singing the Blues and Brain Sweat. The latter was a comedy that ran briefly on Broadway in 1934 and featured the legendary Rose McClendon in its cast.

== Mentor and advocate for black actors ==
Not satisfied with the number and range of roles available for black actors, Campbell and McClendon founded the Negro People's Theatre in 1935. A highlight of their Harlem-based company was the successful staging of an all-black production of Waiting for Lefty by Clifford Odets. Two years later, in the wake of McClendon's death, Campbell and his wife, the concert singer Muriel Rahn, founded the Rose McClendon Players. Their activities took place in the basement of the Mt. Morris Park Library at 9 West 124th Street in New York City. Under Campbell's direction, the Rose McClendon Players helped establish the careers of several black artists, including Frederick O'Neal, Helen Martin, Edmund Cambridge, Loften Mitchell and Abram Hill.

One of Campbell's best-known protégés was Ossie Davis, a young actor who immediately impressed Campbell with his booming voice and commanding presence. Later, Campbell was instrumental in getting Davis an audition for the lead in a Broadway play JEB. Davis not only got the role (which led to his admission in Actors Equity), but he met his future wife Ruby Dee in the production. Other people who were involved with the Rose McClendon Players included Canada Lee, Dooley Wilson, Jane White, Austin Briggs-Hall, George Norford, Eugene Grisby and Fred Carter.

The Rose McClendon Players initiated a policy of doing only plays written by black playwrights. During their five years of operations, they produced fifteen plays (including both full-length and one-act works). This included the initial production of Hill's On Striver's Row before it premiered with the American Negro Theatre, with Frederick O'Neal in the cast.

Also in 1937, Campbell joined actress Fredi Washington, actor Leigh Whipper, Noble Sissle and W. C. Handy to form the Negro Actors Guild. While simultaneously serving as director of the Rose McClendon Players, Campbell was appointed director of the Harlem unit of the Federal Theater Project in 1939, part of the cultural programs under President Franklin D. Roosevelt's New Deal to support the arts.

About the time that the Rose McClendon Players closed in 1942, Campbell was chosen by the Army to produce Black USO camp shows. His shows featured such leading artists as Duke Ellington and Pearl Bailey. After the end of World War II, Campbell started his own talent agency, representing such clients as Ossie Davis and Ruby Dee. He also served as executive director of the New World Symphony and helped found the Harlem Theater Workshop.

Unhappy with the number and quality of roles offered black actors, Campbell initiated a media campaign in the black press. In a series of editorials and press releases, he complained about the type of roles that blacks were playing on television and in other media outlets. This was highlighted by a media boycott, in which he demanded that blacks turn off their television sets on Saturday, February 26, 1955, to show their economic clout. He discussed his rationale for the media boycott in the Alexandra Isles documentary Scandalize My Name: Stories from the Blacklist, which was released after Campbell's death. "Don't turn on your TV," he told people. "Leave it black, because that's the only way you can make the producers understand that you want a different type of show on television."

This media boycott, commonly referred to as a "blackout", drew much attention. In the wake of the boycott, Campbell was asked to meet with various television executives, which led to increased opportunities for other actors, if not for him. Ossie Davis, who also appeared in Scandalize My Name spoke about Campbell's boycott: "On the basis of that, Dick was sent for. And he talked, and he negotiated, and he opened some doors, and got us some jobs. Of course, they never gave Dick a job." Campbell mounted his media campaign against discrimination in the entertainment industry during the height of McCarthyism. "I was blacklisted," Campbell said.

In 1956, Campbell worked as a director and producer for the American National Theatre Association, a branch of the U.S. State Department. He served in that capacity until 1964, representing the US in Africa in the International Cultural Exchange Program.

== Later years ==
In 1967, Campbell was appointed as assistant director of public affairs in the New York City Human Resources Administration under Mayor John Lindsay. He served as a spokesperson in support of the city's anti-poverty programs.

Campbell continued to criticize theatre companies that did not hire blacks, both on and off the stage. This included black theatre companies, especially those receiving large grants. In 1968, Campbell expressed outrage at the newly formed Negro Ensemble Company because in their initial season, they lacked plays written by African-American playwrights but had just received a $450,000 grant from the Ford Foundation to help support such work.

In 1972, Campbell and his second wife, Beryl, founded the Sickle Cell Disease Foundation of Greater New York to address a genetic disease occurring among people of African descent. He served as executive director of the organization until his death.

== Marriage and family ==
Campbell married Muriel Rahn, a concert singer, in 1932. They were married until her death in 1961. They had three daughters: Diana Wilson, Paulette Wilson and Patricia Wilson Campbell.

Later he married Beryl Campbell; together they co-founded the Sickle Cell Disease Foundation of Greater New York.

== Death ==
Campbell died on Tuesday, December 20, 1994, at the Mt. Sinai Hospital, New York, after a long illness. He was 91 years old.

== Awards and recognition ==
- 1991 – Living Legend Award, National Black Theatre Festival

== See also ==
- Harlem Renaissance
