= Arthur Whetsel =

American jazz trumpeter (1905–1940)

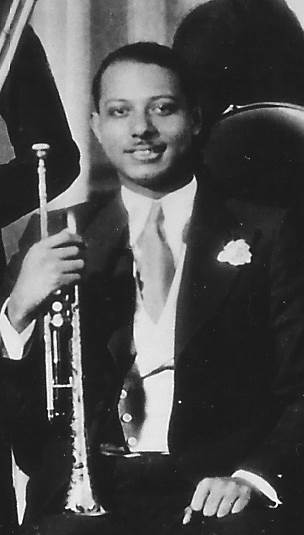
- Whetsel in 1929

Background information
- Also known as: Art (Artie) Whetsol
- Born: Arthur Parker Whetsel; February 22, 1905; Punta Gorda, Florida, U.S.
- Died: May 1, 1940 (aged 35) Central Islip, New York, U.S.
- Genres: Jazz; Dixieland jazz
- Occupation: Musician
- Instruments: Trumpet; cornet
- Years active: 1922–1938
- Formerly of: Duke Ellington's Washingtonians
- Burial place: Woodlawn Cemetery, Bronx

Arthur Parker Whetsel (February 22, 1905 – May 1, 1940) was an early "sweet" trumpeter in Duke Ellington's Washingtonians.

== Biography ==
Arthur Whetsel was born in Punta Gorda, Florida, one of two children of the Reverend Oscar N. Whetsel, an elder in the Seventh-day Adventist Church originally of Piqua, Ohio, and Lucy W. Parker, a schoolteacher originally from Marion County, Alabama. After Oscar Whetsel's death in 1906, his widow married the Reverend Lewis Charles Sheafe (1859–1938), who was the leading African American minister in the Seventh-day Adventist Church during the early twentieth century.

Whetsel grew up in Los Angeles, California, where he began playing the cornet at the age of eight. In his teens, his family moved to Washington, D.C., where, after playing in a number of bands and stage shows, he became one of the members of Duke Ellington's first band, the Washingtonians. He was present on July 26, 1923, in New York City when the Washingtonians, billed as "Snowden's Novelty Orchestra", with Elmer Snowden on banjo and saxophone, Ellington on piano, Whetsel on trumpet, Sonny Greer on drums and vocals, and Otto Hardwick on clarinet, made a "trial recording" at the Victor Talking Machine Company; this was Ellington's first visit to a recording studio.

Leaving the band in 1923 to study medicine, he returned in 1928 to perform on a number of Ellington's most recognizable pieces during Ellington's stint at the Cotton Club, including "Black Beauty", "Black and Tan", and "Mood Indigo". His sound provided a contrast with Bubber Miley, Ellington's other trumpeter during the period. Whetsel had a unique broad, open tone of ample depth and sonority despite the elegant, soft quality of his muted playing.

Whetsel's behavior became erratic in 1938, and after an incident where he "went haywire" during a gig at Rutgers University, he was replaced by trumpeter Wallace Jones. Diagnosed with an inoperable brain tumor, he was confined to the Central Islip State Hospital (later the Central Islip Psychiatric Center) in Suffolk County, New York, where he died in May 1940.

He is buried in Woodlawn Cemetery in the Bronx, New York.
