= Growling (wind instruments) =

Musical technique

Growling
A growl on a baritone saxophone.

Growling is a musical technique where the instrumentalist vocalizes into the instrument to alter quality of the sound. Growling is used primarily in rock and blues style playing, it is also frequently used in klezmer music; it is popular in the woodwind family of instruments, especially the saxophone, though it is also commonly used on brass instruments, as well. It is commonly used by mainstream artists such as Ben Webster, Illinois Jacquet and Earl Bostic. Outside of these styles and instruments, it is often considered a novelty effect.

The growl gives the performer's sound a dark, guttural, gritty timbre resulting largely from the rustle noise and desirable consonance and dissonance effects produced. The technique of simultaneous playing a note and singing into an instrument is also known as horn chords or multiphonics.

== Method ==
The most common and effective method of woodwind growling is to hum, sing, or even scream into the mouthpiece of the instrument. This method introduces interference within the instrument itself, breaking up the normal quality of sound waves produced. Furthermore, the vibration of the vocal note in the mouth and lips creates rustle noise in the instrument.

The vocally produced note can be the same note (though this is believed to be less effective), a natural third or perfect fifth, or any random note, usually from a different octave than the note the instrument is producing. The latter choice is believed to cause the most interference and yield the darkest, grittiest timbre.

== Alternate methods ==
A woodwind growl can also be produced by allowing air to escape from around the corners of the mouth, causing a vibration in the lips and mouthpiece. Although this method does not set up patterns of interference, it does produce the characteristic rustle noise of the growl.

Alternately, it is possible to use multiphonic fingering to create a growl-like effects. The performer selects a bizarre or unusual fingering that causes the instrument to attempt to sound on multiple notes. This creates interference, but no beating or rustle noise.

Other methods include constricting the airway to create a "rasp".

== Use in other instruments ==
A "growl" can be produced by instruments outside of the woodwind family such as the trumpet or the trombone. Bubber Miley is often referred to as "growl trumpeter". A "growl trombone" may be seen in a 1929 film Black and Tan Fantasy played by Joe "Tricky Sam" Nanton.

Harmonica players have started growling as well by using a technique similar to bending notes which causes the reeds to project a raspy guttural sound.

Trombone Multiphonics
Growl trombone.

== See also ==
- Wah-wah
