= Bubber Miley =

American jazz trumpeter, cornetist, and composer (1903–1932)

James "Bubber" Miley
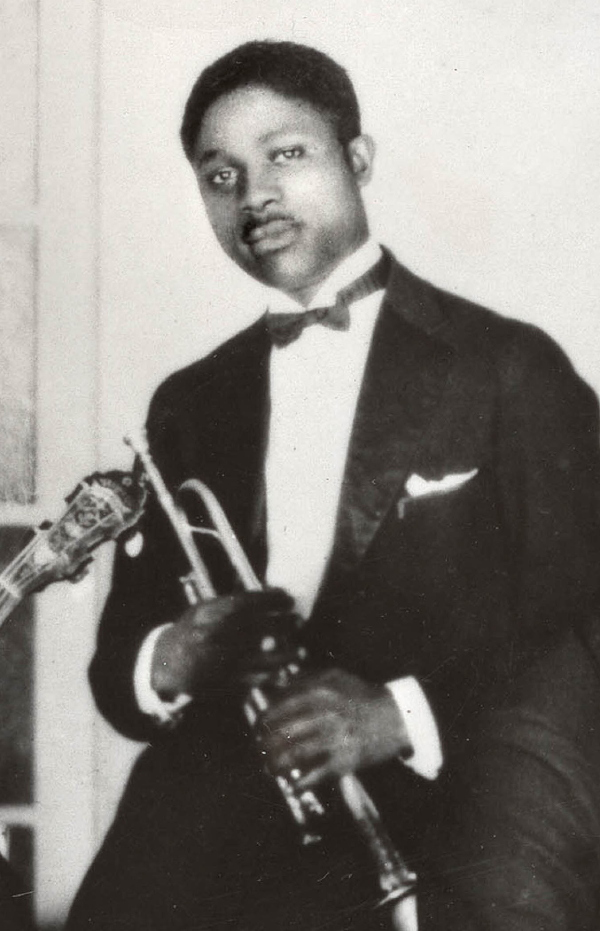
- Miley c. late 1920s

Background information
- Born: James Wesley Miley; April 3, 1903; Aiken, South Carolina, U.S.
- Died: May 20, 1932 (aged 29) Welfare Island, New York, U.S.
- Genres: Jazz, Dixieland
- Instruments: Trumpet, cornet

James Wesley "Bubber" Miley (April 3, 1903 – May 20, 1932) was an American early jazz trumpet and cornet player, specializing in the use of the plunger mute.

== Early life (1903–1923) ==
Miley was born in Aiken, South Carolina, United States, into a musical family. At the age of six, he and his family moved to New York City where, as a child, he occasionally sang for money on the streets, and later, at the age of 14, studied to play the trombone and cornet.

In 1920, after having served in the Navy for 18 months, he joined a jazz formation named the Carolina Five, and remained a member for the next three years, playing small clubs and boat rides all around New York City. After leaving the band at the age of 19, Miley briefly toured the Southern States with a show titled The Sunny South, and then joined Mamie Smith's Jazz Hounds, replacing trumpeter Johnny Dunn. They regularly performed in clubs around New York City and Chicago. While touring in Chicago, he heard King Oliver's Creole Jazz Band playing and was captivated by Oliver's use of mutes. Soon Miley found his own voice by combining the straight and plunger mute with a growling sound.

== Duke Ellington years (1923–1929) ==
Miley's talent and unique style were soon noticed in New York's jazz scene by Duke Ellington who wanted him to jump in for trumpeter Arthur Whetsel. According to saxophonist Otto Hardwicke, Ellington's band members had to shanghai Miley into joining them for his first performance, at the Hollywood on Broadway in 1923. At the time, Ellington's Washingtonians were formally led by Elmer Snowden, but Ellington, who factually had already been running the formation, also took over its official leadership a few months later.

Miley's collaboration with Ellington has secured his place in jazz history. Early Ellington hits, such as "Black and Tan Fantasy", "Doin' the Voom Voom", "East St. Louis Toodle-Oo", "The Mooche", and "Creole Love Call", prominently featured Miley's solo work and were thematically inspired by his melodic ideas, which he, in turn, often borrowed from Baptist hymns sung in his church, such as Stephen Adams' "Holy City". With fellow band member, trombonist Joe "Tricky Sam" Nanton, Miley developed the "wah-wah" sound that characterized Ellington's early "jungle music" style. Many jazz critics consider Miley's musical contributions to be integral to Ellington's early success during the time they performed in the Kentucky Club and Cotton Club.

In 1924, while working with Ellington, Miley also recorded "Down In The Mouth Blues" and "Lenox Avenue Shuffle", as a duo named The Texas Blues Destroyers, with Alvin Ray on reed organ. They managed to trick three different record companies into recording the same two songs, both composed by Ray.

In interviews, former co-musicians such as Ellington, Nanton, Hardwick, and Harry Carney spoke fondly of Bubber Miley's carefree character and joie de vivre, exemplified in numerous anecdotes. On the other hand, they also mention his unreliability, and problems with alcohol abuse. Miley's lifestyle eventually led to his breaking up with Ellington's band in 1929, but his influence on the Duke Ellington Orchestra lasted far longer. His legacy lived on in trumpeters such as Cootie Williams and later Ray Nance, who both were able to adopt Miley's style when required.

== Final years (1929–1932) ==
After leaving Ellington's orchestra in 1929, Miley joined Noble Sissle's Orchestra for a one-month tour to Paris, France. After returning to New York, he recorded with groups led by King Oliver, Jelly Roll Morton, Hoagy Carmichael, Zutty Singleton and with Leo Reisman's society dance band. Miley also performed live with Reisman, albeit being the only African American in Reisman's all-white formation, either dressed in an usher's uniform and off the bandstand, or hidden from view by a screen. In 1930, he recorded six songs for Victor Records under the name Bubber Miley and his Mileage Makers, a formation of thirteen musicians including clarinetist Buster Bailey.

Miley's alcoholism terminally affected his life. On May 20, 1932, at the age of 29, he died of tuberculosis, on Welfare Island, now Roosevelt Island, in New York City. Miley lived just a little longer than his contemporary, jazz cornetist Bix Beiderbecke, whose life was also cut short due to alcohol abuse.
