= Wah-wah pedal =

Effects pedal for electric guitars

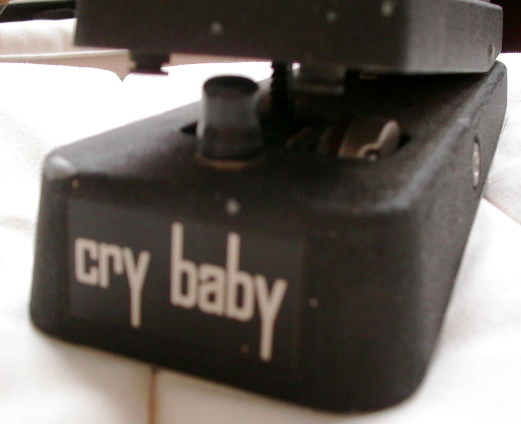
Thomas Organ Cry Baby (1970) manufactured by JEN

Wah-wah pedal (Dunlop Crybaby 535q) on electric guitar with distortion.

A wah-wah pedal, or simply wah pedal, is a type of effects pedal designed for electric guitar that alters the timbre of the input signal to create a distinctive sound, mimicking the human voice saying the onomatopoeic name "wah-wah". The pedal sweeps a band-pass filter up and down in frequency to create a spectral glide. The wah-wah effect originated in the 1920s, with trumpet or trombone players finding they could produce an expressive crying tone by moving a mute in, and out of the instrument's bell. This was later simulated with electronic circuitry for the electric guitar when the wah-wah pedal was invented. It is controlled by movement of the player's foot on a rocking pedal connected to a potentiometer. Wah-wah effects may be used without moving the treadle as a fixed filter to alter an instrument’s timbre (known as a "cocked-wah"), or to create a "wacka-wacka" funk-styled rhythm for rhythm guitar playing.

An auto-wah pedal uses an envelope follower to control the filter instead of a potentiometer.

== History ==
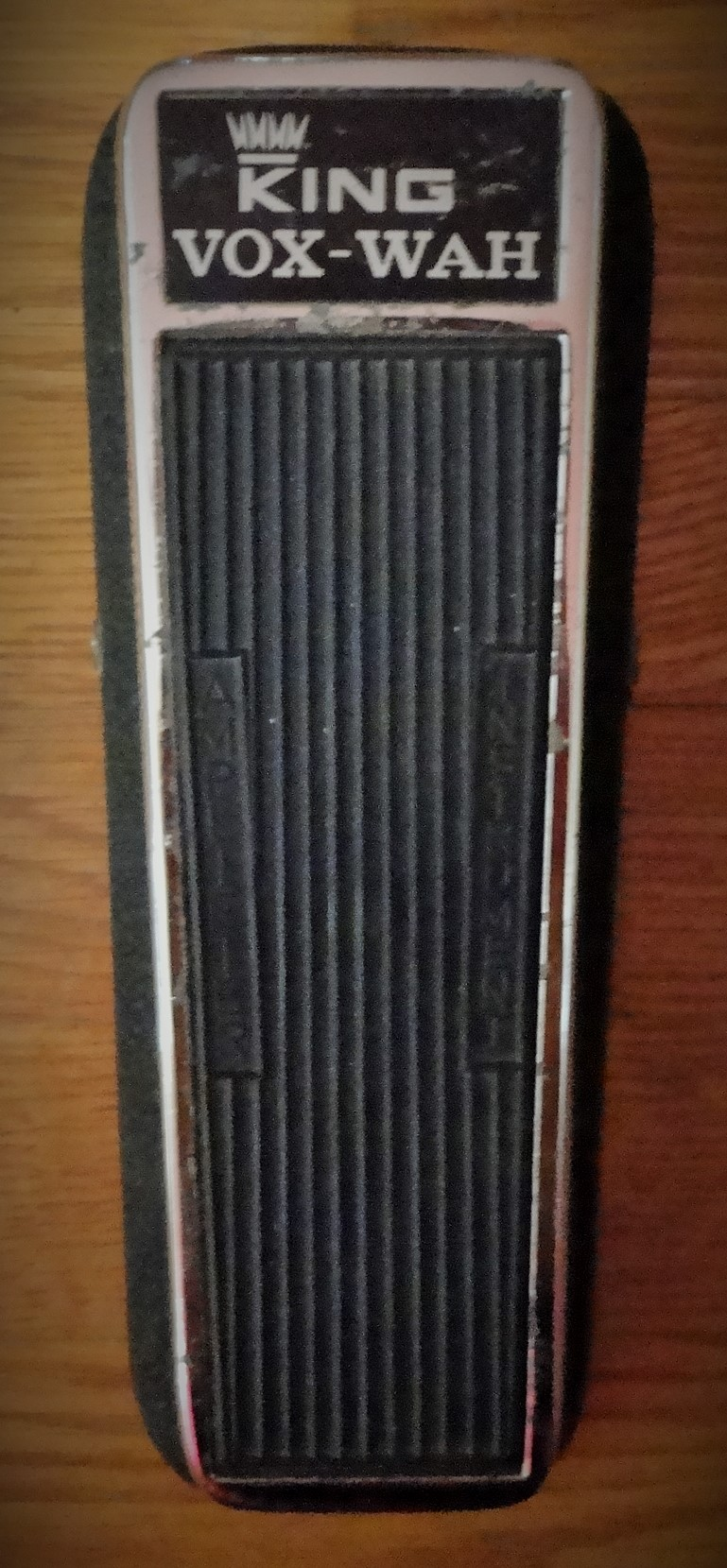
A 1968 King Vox Wah pedal similar to one that was owned by Jimi Hendrix

The first wah pedal was created by Bradley J. Plunkett at Warwick Electronics Inc./Thomas Organ Company in 1966. This pedal is the original prototype made from a transistorized MRB (mid-range boost) potentiometer bread-boarded circuit and the housing of a Vox Continental Organ volume pedal. The concept, however, was not new. Country guitar virtuoso Chet Atkins had used a similar, self-designed device on his late 1950s recordings of "Hot Toddy" and "Slinkey". Jazz guitarist Peter Van Wood had a modified Hammond organ expression pedal; he recorded in 1955 a version of George Gershwin's "Summertime" with a "crying" tone, and other recordings including humorous "novelty" effects. A DeArmond Tone and Volume pedal was used in the early 1960s by Big Jim Sullivan, notably in some Krew Cats instrumental tracks, and in Dave Berry's song "The Crying Game".

The creation of the modern wah pedal stemmed from the redesign of the Vox Super Beatle guitar amplifier in 1966. Warwick Electronics Inc. also owned Thomas Organ Company and had earlier entered into an agreement with Jennings Musical Instruments (JMI) of England for Thomas to distribute the Vox name and products in the United States. In addition to distributing the British-made Vox amplifiers, the Thomas Organ Company also designed and manufactured much of the Vox equipment sold in the US. The more highly regarded British Vox amplifiers were designed by Dick Denney and made by JMI, the parent company of Vox. Warwick assigned Thomas Organ Company to create a new product line of solid state Vox amplifiers called Vox Amplifonic Orchestra, which included the Super Beatle amplifier, named to capitalize on the Vox brand name's popularity in association with the Beatles, who used the JMI English Vox amplifiers such as the famous Vox AC30. The US-made Vox product line development was headed by musician and bandleader Bill Page. While creating the Vox Amplifonic Orchestra, the Thomas Organ Company decided to create an American-made equivalent of the British Vox amplifier but with transistorized (solid state) circuits, rather than vacuum tubes, which would be less expensive to manufacture. During the re-design of the USA Vox amplifier, Stan Cuttler, head engineer of Thomas Organ Company, assigned Brad Plunkett, a junior electronics engineer, to replace the expensive Jennings 3-position mid-range boost (MRB) circuit switch with a transistorized solid state MRB circuit.

Plunkett had lifted and bread-boarded a transistorized tone-circuit from the Thomas Organ (an electric solid state transistorized organ) to duplicate the Jennings 3-position circuit. After adjusting and testing the amplifier with an electronic oscillator and oscilloscope, Plunkett connected the output to the speaker and tested the circuit audibly. At that point, several engineers and technical consultants, including Bill Page and Del Casher, noticed the sound effect caused by the circuit. Page insisted on testing this bread-boarded circuit while he played his saxophone through an amplifier. John Glennon, an assistant junior electronics engineer with the Thomas Organ Company, was summoned to bring a volume control pedal which was used in the Vox Continental Organ so that the transistorized MRB potentiometer bread-boarded circuit could be installed in the pedal's housing. After the installation, Page began playing his saxophone through the pedal and asked Joe Banaron, CEO of Warwick Electronics Inc./Thomas Organ Company, to listen to the effect. At this point, the first electric guitar was plugged into the prototype wah pedal by guitarist Del Casher who suggested to Joe Banaron that this was a guitar effects pedal rather than a wind instrument effects pedal. Banaron, being a fan of the big band style of music, was interested in marketing the wah pedal for wind instruments as suggested by Page rather than for the electric guitar as suggested by Casher. After a remark by Casher to Banaron regarding the Harmon mute style of trumpet playing in the famous recording of "Sugar Blues" from the 1930s, Banaron decided to market the wah-wah pedal using Clyde McCoy's name for endorsement.

After the invention of the wah pedal, the prototype was modified by Casher and Plunkett to better accommodate the harmonic qualities of the electric guitar. However, since Vox had no intention of marketing the wah pedal for electric guitar players, the prototype wah-wah pedal was given to Del Casher for performances at Vox press conferences and film scores for Universal Pictures. The un-modified version of the Vox wah pedal was released to the public in February 1967 with an image of Clyde McCoy on the bottom of the pedal.

Warwick Electronics Inc. assigned Lester L. Kushner, an engineer with the Thomas Organ Company, and Brad Plunkett to write and submit the documentation for the wah-wah pedal patent. The patent application was submitted on 24 February 1967, which included technical diagrams of the pedal being connected to a four-stringed "guitar" (as noted from the "Description of the Preferred Embodiment"). Warwick Electronics Inc. was granted U.S. patent 3,530,224 ("foot-controlled continuously variable preference circuit for musical instruments") on 22 September 1970.

Early versions of the Clyde McCoy featured an image of McCoy on the bottom panel, which soon gave way to only his signature. Thomas Organ then wanted the effect branded as their own for the American market, changing it to Cry Baby which was sold in parallel to the Italian Vox V846. Thomas Organ's failure to trademark the Cry Baby name soon led to the market being flooded with Cry Baby imitations from various parts of the world, including Italy, where all of the original Vox and Cry Babys were made. JEN, who had been responsible for the manufacture of Thomas Organ and Vox wah pedals, also made rebranded pedals for companies such as Fender and Gretsch and under their own JEN brand. When Thomas Organ moved production completely to Sepulveda, California and Chicago, Illinois these Italian models continued to be made and are among the more collectible wah pedals today.

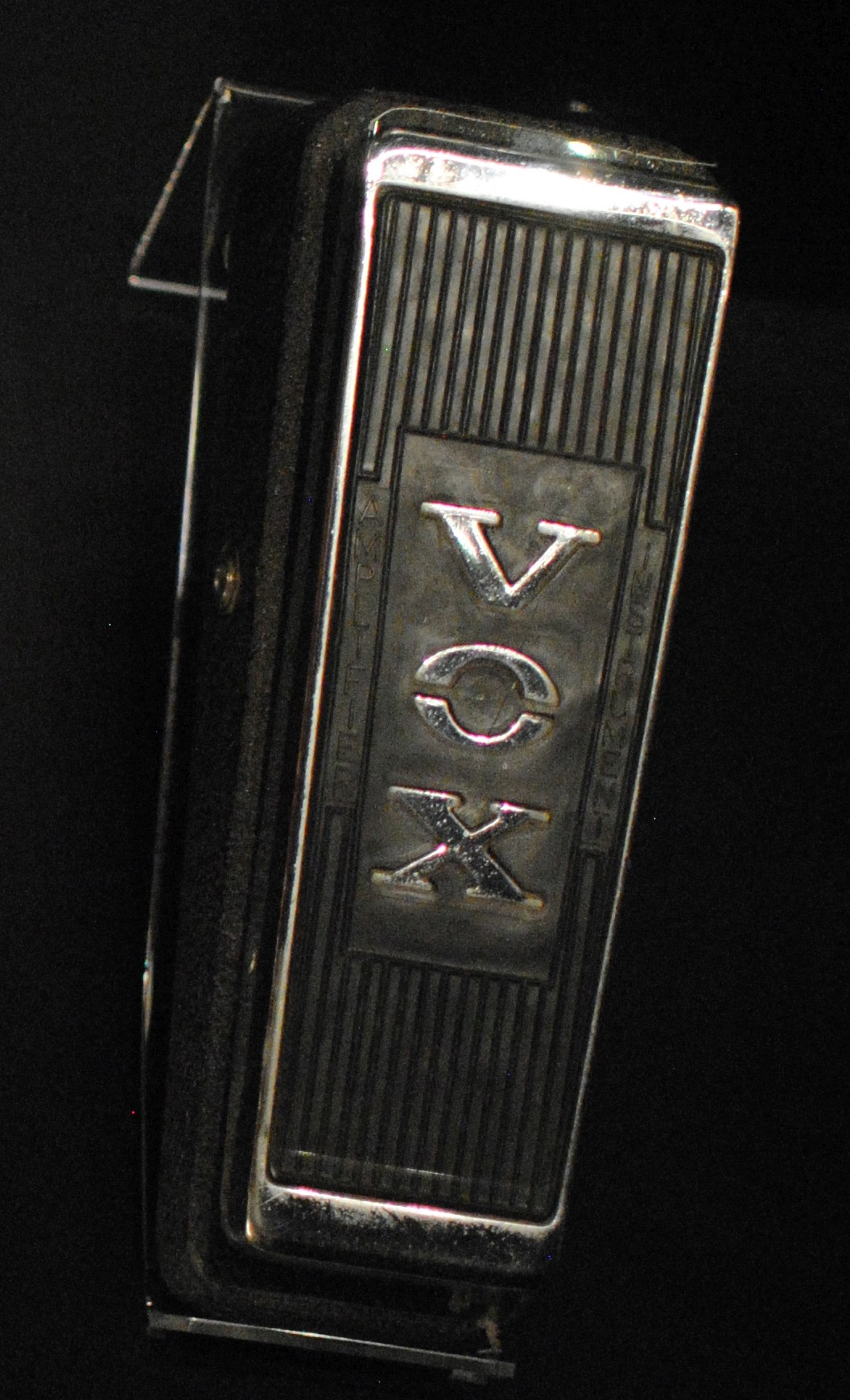
David Gilmour's VOX Wah Wah guitar effects pedal, as used on Obscured by Clouds (1972), displayed at the Pink Floyd: Their Mortal Remains exhibition

Some of the most famous electric guitarists of the day were keen to adopt the wah-wah pedal soon after its release. Among the first recordings featuring wah-wah pedal were "Tales of Brave Ulysses" by Cream with Eric Clapton on guitar and "Burning of the Midnight Lamp" by the Jimi Hendrix Experience, both released in 1967. Hendrix also used wah wah on his famous song "Voodoo Child", in intro and in soloing. According to Del Casher, Hendrix learned about the pedal from Frank Zappa, another well-known early user. Clapton, in particular, used the device on many of the Cream songs included on their second and third albums, Disraeli Gears (1967) and Wheels of Fire (1968) respectively. Clapton would subsequently employ it again on "Wah-Wah", from his good friend George Harrison's solo album All Things Must Pass, upon the dissolution of The Beatles in 1970.

The wah-wah pedal increased in popularity in the following years, and was employed by guitarists such as Terry Kath of Chicago, Martin Barre of Jethro Tull, Jimmy Page of Led Zeppelin, and Tony Iommi of Black Sabbath. Kirk Hammett of Metallica would later use the pedal on many Metallica songs, most notably the guitar solo of Enter Sandman. David Gilmour of Pink Floyd used the pedal to create the "whale" effect during Echoes. He discovered this effect as a result of a roadie accidentally plugging his guitar into the output of the pedal and the input being plugged into his amp. The effect was first used during live performances of The Embryo during 1970 but was then switched into Echoes as it was being developed before being released on the Meddle album on 31 October 1971. Mick Ronson used a Cry Baby while recording The Rise and Fall of Ziggy Stardust and the Spiders from Mars. Michael Schenker also utilized the pedal in his work. Former Procol Harum guitarist Robin Trower used them extensively on his early albums, Twice removed from Yesterday, Bridge of Sighs and For Earth Below. He would often start a solo clean then towards the climax use wah wah to elevate the level of intensity. Also a percussive wacka wacka sound during rhythm sections. Trower has used many different pedals during his career, they include Tychobrahe in the 70s, Vox Jennings models. Also collaborating with Mike Fuller on the Fulltone Wahful pedal.

One of the most famous uses of this effect is heard on Isaac Hayes's "Theme from Shaft" (1971), with Charles Pitts playing the guitar.

In addition to rock music, many R&B artists have also used the wah-wah effect, including Lalo Schifrin on "Enter the Dragon" (1973), Johnny Pate on "Shaft in Africa" (1973) and James Brown on "Funky President" (1974). Funk band Kool & the Gang, B. T. Express, and Jimmy Castor Bunch used the wah-wah pedal also. Melvin Ragin, better known by the nickname Wah Wah Watson, was a member of the Motown Records studio band, The Funk Brothers, where he recorded with artists such as The Temptations on "Papa Was a Rollin' Stone", Marvin Gaye on "Let's Get It On", The Four Tops, Gladys Knight & the Pips, The Supremes, and The Undisputed Truth on "Smiling Faces Sometimes".

In the late 1980s, the wah-wah pedal was revived in the British music industry by John Squire of The Stone Roses, who bought a wah-wah pedal to differentiate his sound from other contemporary acts of the time. Afterwards, the wah-wah pedal would also be used by bands such as the Happy Mondays and the Charlatans, and became one of the defining sounds of British guitar music in the late '80s and early '90s.

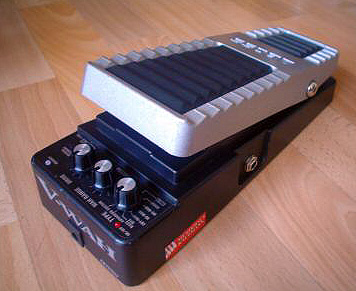
A Roland V-Wah pedal.

== Uses ==
The main use of the wah-wah pedal is by rocking the pedal up and down. By doing this motion, the pedal reacts by sweeping through the peak response of a frequency filter up and down in frequency to create a spectral glide.

A different function of the pedal is to use it in a fixed position, which changes how an instrument sounds by selecting a certain frequency range. A guitarist using the wah in this way selects a position on the pedal and leaves the pedal there. Depending on the position of the pedal, this will boost or cut a specific frequency. This can be used for emphasizing the "sweet spot" in the tonal spectrum of a particular instrument. One electric guitar player to use the pedal in this way was Jimi Hendrix, who revolutionized its application by combining a Fender Stratocaster with stacked Marshall Amplifiers (in both static and modulated mode) for lead and rhythm guitar applications unheard of before then.

Another famous style of wah-wah playing is utilizing it for a percussive "wacka-wacka" effect during rhythm guitar parts. This is done by muting strings, holding down a chord and moving the pedal at the same time. This was first heard on the song "Little Miss Lover" (1967) on Axis: Bold as Love, by the Jimi Hendrix Experience. The "wah-wah" and "wacka-wacka" effects are often associated with the bands on 1970s TV variety shows, like those of Sonny and Cher, Flip Wilson, or Donny and Marie Osmond; or with the soundtracks of pornographic films, the sound referenced in TV commercials for Axe body spray as "bow chicka wow wow."

== Other instruments ==
- Bass - A wah bass solo appears on "Mommy, What's a Funkadelic?", and all through "What Is Soul?" on Funkadelic's self-titled debut album (1970). Geezer Butler made extensive use of a wah pedal in the bass solo "Bassically" on Black Sabbath's debut self-titled album (1970). Michael Henderson used a wah wah pedal on Miles Davis album On the Corner (1972). Chris Squire of Yes used a wah-wah pedal on his solo piece "The Fish" on the album Fragile.
- Trumpet - jazz/crossover records feature wind and brass instruments with the effect – Miles Davis' trumpet with a wah pedal was a well-known example.
- Sax - Several of Frank Zappa's sax players such as Bunk Gardner, Ian Underwood, and Napoleon Murphy Brock played saxophones amplified through a wah-wah pedal on some of Zappa's albums like Uncle Meat, Chunga's Revenge, and The Dub Room Special. David Sanborn can be heard playing an alto saxophone modified by a wah-wah pedal on the David Bowie album Young Americans (1975).

== See also ==
- Talk box
- EQ
- Auto-wah

== Further information ==
- Cry Baby: The Pedal that Rocks the World (documentary, 2011)
