= Hot Feet Club =

Nightclub in New York City (1928–1933)

Coordinates: 40.728060°N 74.001705°W

The Hot Feet Club was a popular nightclub in New York City that operated from 1928 until 1933, approximately.

The mob-controlled speakeasy attracted "some of the best crowds" of the day, such as boxing champion Gene Tunney and Mayor Jimmy Walker. Like some other clubs, it was racially segregated, with mostly white audiences coming to see mostly black performers. It opened at 11 p.m. but didn't really get going until later. Some performances were broadcast from 1:00 to 1:30 a.m.

At different times, bands led by Otto Hardwick and Elmer Snowden were featured. Some of the greatest singers and musicians of the time performed at the club, including Alberta Hunter, pianist and composer Fats Waller, and jazz drummer Chick Webb. With a well-to-do clientele, the performers were well paid, sometimes making $10-15 or as much as $30 in tips per night, equivalent to a week's salary at the time.

The relatively small club was located in a storefront at 142 West Houston Street, on the north side of the street between Sullivan Street and MacDougal Street in Greenwich Village, in a building still extant. It was said to be owned principally by Harry Lyons, a reputed gangster from the Bronx, although some sources say it was owned by a man named Walsh who was killed by members of the Chicago mob when he tried to open a second location for the club there, leading to the demise of the Hot Feet Club.
