= One Mile from Heaven =

1937 American drama film directed by Allan Dwan

- Theatrical release poster
- Directed by: Allan Dwan
- Screenplay by: Lou Breslow; John Patrick
- Story by: Robin Harris; Alfred Golden
- Produced by: Sol M. Wurtzel
- Starring: Claire Trevor; Sally Blane; Douglas Fowley; Fredi Washington; Joan Carroll; Ralf Harolde
- Cinematography: Sidney Wagner
- Edited by: Fred Allen
- Production company: 20th Century Fox
- Distributed by: 20th Century Fox
- Release date: August 18, 1937
- Running time: 67 minutes
- Country: United States
- Language: English

One Mile from Heaven is a 1937 American drama film directed by Allan Dwan and written by Lou Breslow and John Patrick. The film stars Claire Trevor, Sally Blane, Douglas Fowley, Fredi Washington, Joan Carroll and Ralf Harolde. The film was released on August 18, 1937, by 20th Century Fox.

== Plot ==
While investigating a bogus murder story in a black neighborhood, a reporter, Lucy "Tex" Warren (Claire Trevor) notices a little girl named Sunny who appears to be white. Tex also encounters Sunny's mother, Flora Jackson (Fredi Washington), a fair-skinned black seamstress. Suspicious of the relationship between the two, Tex and other reporters investigate, only to turn up evidence (photos and a hospital record) that support Flora's claim.

Tex then encounters a prison convict who claims that Sunny is the child of a deceased criminal Cliff Lucas, whose wife, Barbara (Sally Blane), had attempted to leave with the baby and wound up in a car accident. Lucas had secretly tailed Barbara and took the baby from the wreck while his wife was unconscious. Upon waking in the hospital, Barbara was told that the baby had died.

Lucas hired Flora to take care of the child; he told her that his wife deserted him and the baby. After Lucas was killed by police, Flora did not want the baby to go to an orphanage, so she reared Sunny as her own. Barbara, on being informed that her daughter is still alive, applies to recover her child. After seeing Flora and Sunny's strong attachment to each other, she asks Flora to live with them as a nurse. The judge forbids Tex to publish the story, feeling that the notoriety would negatively affect Sunny.

== Cast ==
- Claire Trevor as Lucy 'Tex' Warren
- Sally Blane as Barbara Harrison
- Douglas Fowley as Jim Tabor
- Fredi Washington as Flora Jackson
- Joan Carroll as Sunny
- Ralf Harolde as Moxie McGrath
- John Eldredge as Jerry Harrison
- Paul McVey as Johnny
- Ray Walker as Mortimer (Buck) Atlas
- Russell Hopton as Peter Brindell
- Chick Chandler as Charlie Milford
- Eddie "Rochester" Anderson as Henry Bangs
- Howard Hickman as Judge Clarke
- Bill Robinson as Officer Joe Dudley

== Critical reception ==
Variety wrote, "Film has the advantage of being away from the stereotyped run of pictures, but whether the theme fits into the popular groove is something to think about." The reviewer welcomed the return of Fredi Washington and described her as "splendid" and stated that with her "looks, good voice and real acting ability [is] deserving of a better chance than this picture offers."

Modern Screen’s Leo Townsend referenced the film’s title to comment that the film was “"about the same distance from first-rate entertainment." He felt that Bill Robinson's tap dancing was a highlight and wrote, "It might be said that Mr. Robinson dances away with the picture." He wrote that Claire Trevor "does well with her reporter role" but "the acting honors go to Fredi Washington [who] looks amazingly like Sylvia Sidney [and] is a beautiful and accomplished actress."

The Film Daily wrote that after an interesting start, the film "develops into an ordinary newspaper and gangster affair and adds up to secondary program fare." It stated that the film failed by centering everything around Claire Trevor's "hardly likeable" character, but praised the dancing of Bill Robinson and the acting of Fredi Washington and "a sweet capable child Joan Carol."

Harrison's Reports described the film as "a mildly entertaining program picture … [with some] human interest … but lacking in romance or fast action … the story is not strong enough to hold one’s attention throughout." It noted that the plot contained an element of blackmail that "makes it unsuitable for children. Harmless for adults."

Motion Picture Daily said that the film was "interesting, entertaining and somewhat novel … and should be found of general interest by all audiences, although it is an unpretentious film." It noted that the absence of a romantic aspect was unusual "but to the credit of the picture, it is not missed, and in fact, probably would detract from the story as it stands." The review noted the contributions of Bill Robinson and Fredi Washington, and offered the latter "high praise for a splendidly restrained performance."
