= Spectral glide =

Music composition concept

A spectral glide is a music-composition concept, consisting of a "modification of the vowel quality of a tone" (Erickson 1975, p. 72). Since the vowel quality of a tone is determined by the overtones, spectrum, or timbre of that tone (all three terms describe approximately the same hearing experience), a spectral glide is a move from a spectrum characteristic of one vowel to a spectrum characteristic of another vowel. A spectral glide may be accomplished through a wah-wah, mute, or pedal, or through the modification of one's vocal tract while speaking, singing, or playing an instrument such as the didgeridoo. Lip-vibrated instruments with large mouthpieces such as tuba and trombone allow extensive modification of vowel quality, while woodwinds have a smaller range, with the exception of the flute in air-sound mode. Strings have the smallest range (Erickson 1975, p. 72).

The glide rate and the vowel contrasts used are important factors in the compositional use of spectral glides. Karlheinz Stockhausen specifies the use of a trumpet wa-wa mute in his Punkte (1952/1962/64/66/93) through open and closed circles connected by a line. A. Wayne Slawson's computer-generated Wishful Thinking about Winter (Decca DL 710180) uses speechlike sounds featuring a large range of spectral glide rates. Loren Rush began investigating in 1967 the computer-generated modeling of timbres "in between" familiar instruments such as a bassoon and bass clarinet, and devised a program to provide a smooth transition between timbres (Erickson 1975, p. 73).

== See also ==
- Wah-wah pedal
- Muted trumpet
- Subtractive synthesis

== Sources ==
- Erickson, Robert (1975). Sound Structure in Music. University of California Press. ISBN 0-520-02376-5.
