= Earl Bostic =

American jazz saxophonist (1913–1965)

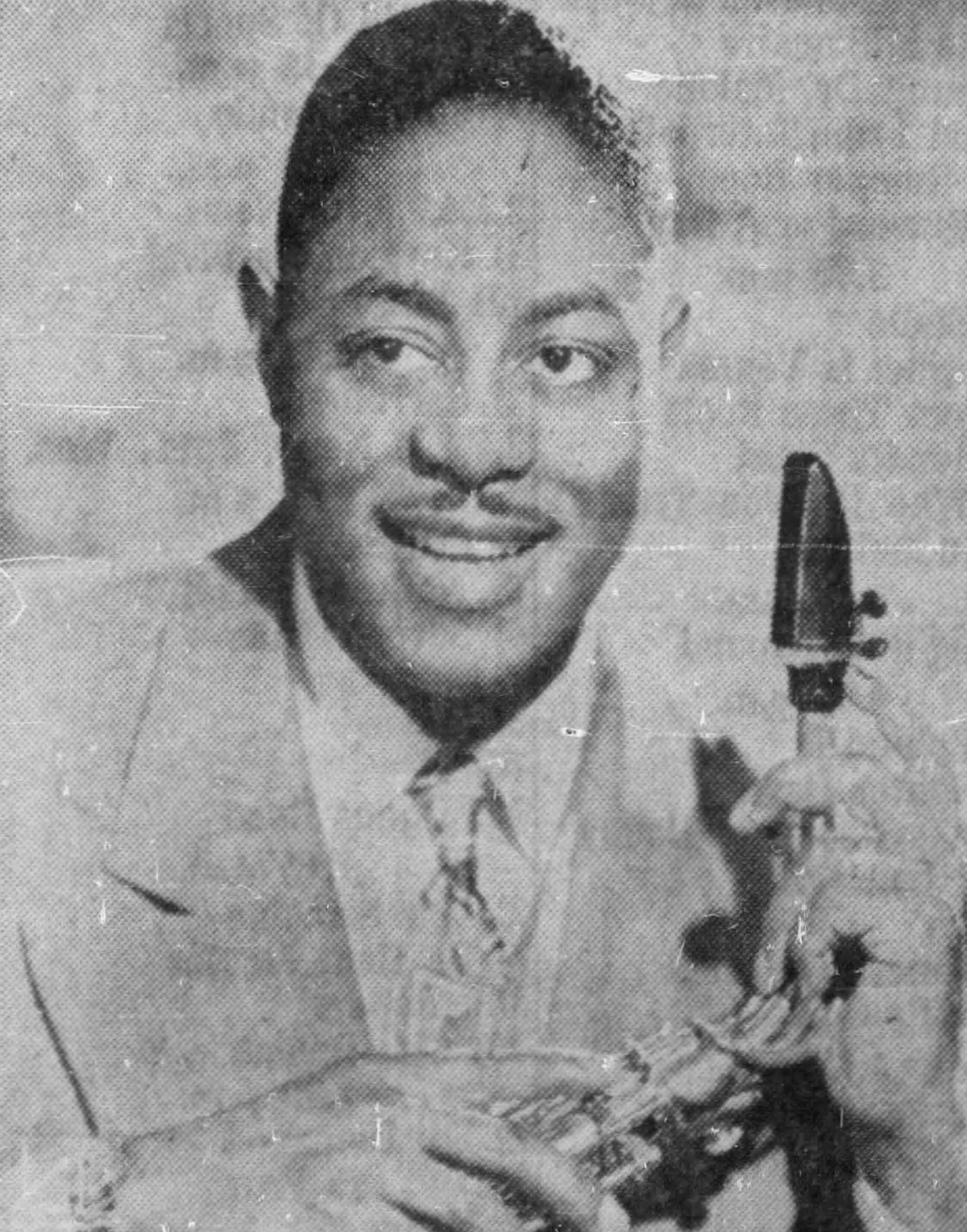
- Bostic in 1961

Background information
- Born: Eugene Earl Bostic; April 25, 1913; Tulsa, Oklahoma, U.S.
- Died: October 28, 1965 (aged 52) Rochester, New York, U.S.
- Genres: Jazz; swing; jump blues; R&B
- Occupation: Musician
- Instrument: Alto saxophone
- Years active: 1931–1965

Eugene Earl Bostic (April 25, 1913 – October 28, 1965) was an American alto saxophonist. Bostic's recording career was diverse, his musical output encompassing jazz, swing, jump blues and the post-war American rhythm and blues style, which he pioneered. He had a number of popular hits such as "Flamingo", "Harlem Nocturne", "Temptation", "Sleep", "Special Delivery Stomp", and "Where or When", which featured his characteristic growl on the horn. He was a major influence on John Coltrane.

== Career ==
Bostic was born in 1913 in Tulsa, Oklahoma. In his youth, he played the clarinet in school and saxophone with the local Boy Scouts troop. He turned professional at the age of 18 when he joined Terence Holder's "Twelve Clouds of Joy". Bostic made his first recording with Lionel Hampton in October 1939, with Charlie Christian, Clyde Hart and Big Sid Catlett. Before that, he performed with Fate Marable on New Orleans riverboats. Bostic graduated from Xavier University in New Orleans. He worked with territory bands as well as Arnett Cobb, Hot Lips Page, Rex Stewart, Don Byas, Charlie Christian, Thelonious Monk, Edgar Hayes, Cab Calloway, and other jazz notable musicians. In 1938, and in 1944, Bostic led the house band at Smalls Paradise. While playing at Small's Paradise, he doubled on guitar and trumpet. During the early 1940s, he was a well-respected regular at the famous jam sessions held at Minton's Playhouse. He formed his own band in 1945 and made the first recordings under his own name for the Majestic label. He turned to rhythm and blues in the late 1940s. His biggest hits were "Temptation", "Sleep", "Flamingo", "You Go to My Head" and "Cherokee". At various times, his band included Keter Betts, Jaki Byard, Benny Carter, John Coltrane, Teddy Edwards, Benny Golson, Blue Mitchell, Tony Scott, Cliff Smalls, Charles Thompson, Stanley Turrentine, Tommy Turrentine, and other musicians who rose to prominence, especially in jazz.

Bostic's King album entitled Jazz As I Feel It (1963) featured Shelly Manne on drums, Joe Pass on guitar and Richard "Groove" Holmes on organ. Bostic recorded A New Sound about one month later, again featuring Holmes and Pass. These recordings allowed Bostic to stretch out beyond the three-minute limit imposed by the 45 RPM format. Bostic was pleased with the sessions, which highlight his total mastery of the blues, but they also foreshadowed musical advances that were later evident in the work of John Coltrane and Eric Dolphy.

He wrote arrangements for Paul Whiteman, Louis Prima, Lionel Hampton, Gene Krupa, Artie Shaw, Hot Lips Page, Jack Teagarden, Ina Ray Hutton, and Alvino Rey.

His songwriting hits include "Let Me Off Uptown", performed by Anita O'Day and Roy Eldridge, and "Brooklyn Boogie", which featured Louis Prima and members of the Brooklyn Dodgers.

Bostic's signature hit, "Flamingo" was recorded in 1951 and remains popular among followers of Carolina Beach Music in South Carolina, North Carolina and Virginia.

In 1953, Bostic and his Orchestra performed for the ninth Cavalcade of Jazz concert held at Wrigley Field in Los Angeles which was produced by Leon Hefflin, Sr. on June 7. Also featured that day were Roy Brown and his Orchestra, Don Tosti and His Mexican Jazzmen, Shorty Rogers, Nat "King" Cole with Velma Middleton, and Louis Armstrong and his All Stars.

During the early 1950s, Bostic lived with his wife in Addisleigh Park in St. Albans, Queens, in New York City, where many other jazz stars made their home. After that, he moved to Los Angeles, where he concentrated on writing arrangements after suffering a heart attack. He opened his own R&B club in Los Angeles, known as the Flying Fox.

== Death ==
Bostic died on October 28, 1965, from a heart attack in Rochester, New York, while performing with his band. He was buried in Southern California's Inglewood Park Cemetery on November 2, 1965. Honorary pallbearers at the funeral included Slappy White and Louis Prima. Today he rests under a simple black slate grave marker inscribed with his name, birth/death dates, and a solo saxophone, located not far from such other musical notable musicians as Chet Baker, Ray Charles, and Ella Fitzgerald, who was born exactly four years after Earl. Bostic was inducted into the Oklahoma Jazz Hall of Fame in 1993.

== Style and influence ==
Bostic was influenced by Sidney Bechet and (according to James Moody) John Coltrane was in turn influenced by Bostic. Coltrane told Down Beat magazine in 1960 that Bostic "showed me a lot of things on my horn. He has fabulous technical facilities on his instrument and knows many a trick." Moody mentioned that "Bostic knew his instrument inside out, back to front and upside down." If one listens carefully to Bostic's fabulous stop time choruses and his extended solo work, the roots of Coltrane's "sheets of sound" become clear.

Bostic's early jazz solos bear similarity to Benny Carter's long flowing lines. Other influences on Bostic include European concert music, bebop and the sounds associated with his Oklahoma roots. Bostic admitted that he was interested in selling records and he went as far as to write out his popular solos note for note in order to please his admiring fans during concerts. Nonetheless, Bostic was always ready to improvise brilliantly during his live performances.

Bostic's virtuosity on the saxophone was legendary, and is evident on records such as "Up There in Orbit", "Earl's Imagination", "Apollo Theater Jump", "All On", "Artistry by Bostic", "Telestar Drive", "Liza", "Lady Be Good" and "Tiger Rag". He was known for his jam-session performances and held his own against Charlie Parker. The alto saxophonist Lou Donaldson recalled seeing Parker get burned by Bostic during one such jam session at Minton's. Donaldson said that Bostic "was the greatest saxophone player I ever knew. Bostic was down at Minton's and Charlie Parker came in there. They played 'Sweet Georgia Brown' or something and he gave Charlie Parker a saxophone lesson. Now you'd see him, we'd run up there and think that we're going to blow him out, and he'd make you look like a fool. Cause he'd play three octaves, louder, stronger and faster." Art Blakey remarked that "Nobody knew more about the saxophone than Bostic, I mean technically, and that includes Bird. Working with Bostic was like attending a university of the saxophone. When Coltrane played with Bostic, I know he learned a lot." Victor Schonfield pointed out that "...his greatest gift was the way he communicated through his horn a triumphant joy in playing and being, much like Louis Armstrong and only a few others have done." He was able to control the horn from low A without using his knee up into the altissimo range years before other saxophonists dared to stray. Bostic played melodies in the altissimo range with a high level of technical precision. He could play wonderfully in any key at any tempo over any changes. Benny Golson, who called Bostic "the best technician I ever heard in my life," mentioned that "He could start from the bottom of the horn and skip over notes, voicing it up the horn like a guitar would. He had circular breathing before I even knew what circular breathing was – we're talking about the early 50s. He had innumerable ways of playing one particular note. He could double tongue, triple tongue. It was incredible what he could do, and he helped me by showing me many technical things." Bostic used a Beechler mouthpiece with a tenor saxophone reed on his Martin Committee model alto sax.

Bostic was a master of the blues and he used this skill in a variety of musical settings. Although he recorded many commercial albums, some notable jazz-based exceptions on the King label include Bostic Rocks Hits of the Swing Age, Jazz As I Feel It and A New Sound. Compositions such as "The Major and the Minor" and "Earl's Imagination" display a solid knowledge of harmony. In 1951, Bostic successfully toured with Dinah Washington on the R&B circuit. Bostic was always well dressed and articulate during interviews. His live performances provided an opportunity for a departure from his commercial efforts and those who witnessed these shows remember him drawing enthusiastic audience responses with technical displays. Known for his stage presence, he appeared on the Soupy Sales TV show and danced the "Soupy Shuffle" better than Soupy while playing the saxophone.

During the late 1940s, Bostic changed his style in a successful attempt to reach a wider audience. The new sound incorporated his distinctive rasp or growl, shorter lines than in his jazz-based recordings, emphasis on a danceable back beat and a new way of wringing "...the greatest possible rhythmic value from every note and phrase." Bostic showed off the new approach in his hit "Temptation", which reached the Top Ten of the R&B chart during the summer of 1948. The addition of Gene Redd on vibes in 1950 rounded out the Bostic sound and he used the vibes on his major hits such as "Flamingo" in 1951. The 1956 version of "Where or When" features Bostic growling through the mid-range of the instrument behind a heavy backbeat and loud bass and it is a marked departure from his approach to the same tune recorded on Gotham in 1947 which showed off his sweet "singing" in the upper register with barely audible percussion. Bostic proved that saxophone instrumentals could climb the hit charts and other saxists with hits including Boots Randolph and Stanley Turrentine have acknowledged his influence.

In February 1959, Bostic was voted No. 2 jazz alto sax in the Playboy jazz poll over leading saxists including Cannonball Adderley and Sonny Stitt. He recorded an inimitable version of "All The Things You Are" released on the Playboy label. In August 1959, he performed at the famous Playboy Jazz Festival in Chicago on the same bill as the major jazz stars of the time.

Bostic discussed his approach to improvising in an interview with Kurt Mohr. "Of course I am maybe one of the few musicians who like simple recurring melody patterns and in all my playing I try to keep a basic melody line in my mind and attempt to develop meaningful inversions and variations...I like the basic blues.... The blues has it all; basic rhythmic quality, genuine lyric content, essential and basic chord structure and maybe above all else, personality. Blues and jazz are inseparable."

Bostic's recording career was diverse and it included small group swing-based jazz, big band jazz, jump blues, organ-based combos and a string of commercial successes.

== Discography ==
=== Albums ===
Sources:

- Earl Bostic and His Alto Sax, Volume 1, King 295-64 [10" LP] (1953); reissued as 295–76 with 2 extra tracks in 1954.
- Earl Bostic and His Alto Sax, Volume 2, King 295-65 [10" LP] (1953); reissued as 295–77 with 2 extra tracks in 1954.
- Earl Bostic and His Alto Sax, Volume 3, King 295-66 [10" LP] (1953); reissued as 295–78 with 2 extra tracks in 1954.
- Earl Bostic and His Alto Sax, Volume 4, King 295-72 [10" LP] (1953); reissued as 295–79 with 2 extra tracks in 1954.
- Earl Bostic Plays The Old Standards, King 295-95 [10" LP] (1955); reissued as 295–103, re-titled Earl Bostic and His Alto Sax, Volume 5
- (Dance to) The Best of Bostic, King 500 (1956)
- Earl Bostic for You, King 503 (1956)
- Alto-Tude, King 515 (1956)
- Dance Time, King 525 (1956)
- Let's Dance with Earl Bostic, King 529 (1956)
- Invitation to Dance with Bostic, King 547 (1957)
- C'mon and Dance with Earl Bostic, King 558 (1958)
- Bostic Rocks (Hits of the Swing Age), King 571 (1958)
- Bostic Showcase of Swinging Dance Tunes, King 583 (1958)
- Alto Magic in Hi-Fi (A Dance Party with Bostic), King 597 (1958)
- Earl Bostic Plays Sweet Tunes of the Fantastic 50s, King 602 (1958)
- Dance Music From the Bostic Workshop, King 613 (1959)
- Earl Bostic Plays Sweet Tunes of the Roaring '20s, King 620 (1959)
- Earl Bostic & His Big Band Play Sweet Tunes of the Swinging '30s, King 632 (1959)
- Earl Bostic Plays Sweet Tunes of the Sentimental 40s, King 640 (1959)
- Musical Pearls by Bostic, King 662 (1959)
- Earl Bostic Plays the Hit Tunes of the Big Broadway Shows, King 705 (1960)
- Earl Bostic by Popular Demand, King 786 (1962)
- Earl Bostic Plays Bossa Nova, King 827 (1963)
- Songs of the Fantastic 50s, Vol. 2, King 838 (1963)
- Jazz As I Feel It (featuring Richard "Groove" Holmes), King 846 (1963)
- The Best of Earl Bostic, Volume 2, King 881 (1964)
- A New Sound by Earl Bostic (featuring Richard "Groove" Holmes), King 900 (1964)
- Earl Bostic Plays the Great Hits of 1964, King 921 (1964)
- Memorial to Earl Bostic: 24 Tunes That Earl Loved the Most!, King 947 (1966) [2LP]
- Harlem Nocturne, King 1048 (1969)
- 14 Original Greatest Hits, King/Gusto 5010X (1977)
- 27 Saloon Songs, Diplomat DS-2407 [2LP]
- The Earl of Bostic, Grand Prix KS-404
- Wild, Man!, Grand Prix KS-416
- Sax "O" Boogie, Oldie Blues OL-8007 (1984)
- Blows a Fuse, Charly R&B CRB-1091 (1985); reissued on CD as Charly R&B CD-CHARLY-241 (1991) with 4 extra tracks

=== CD compilations ===
- Flamingo (Charly R&B Masters, Vol.16), Charly CDRB-16 (1996)
- The Chronological Earl Bostic 1945–1948, Classics 'Blues & Rhythm Series' 5005 (2001)
- The Chronological Earl Bostic 1948–1949, Classics 'Blues & Rhythm Series' 5022 (2002)
- The Chronological Earl Bostic 1949–1951, Classics 'Blues & Rhythm Series' 5039 (2002)
- The Chronological Earl Bostic 1952–1953, Classics 'Blues & Rhythm Series' 5093 (2004)
- The Chronological Earl Bostic 1954–1955, Classics 'Blues & Rhythm Series' 5179 (2007)
- Flamingo, Proper (PROPERPAIRS) PVCD-100 (2002) [2CD]
- Magic Bostic 1944–1952 (Jazz Archives No. 209), EPM Musique 160402 (2003)
- The Very Best of Earl Bostic, Collectables COL-2886 (2004)
- Earl Bostic Plays Flamingo, ASV/Living Era CDAJA-5635 (2006)
- Earl Bostic Plays Jazz Standards, Definitive DRCD-11295 (2006)
- The Earl Bostic Story, Proper PROPERBOX-112 (2006) [4-CD box set]
- Let's Ball Tonight!, Rev-Ola CRREV-163 (2006)
- The Earl Bostic Collection 1939-59, Acrobat ADDCD-3131 (2015) [2CD]
- Four Classic Albums, Avid AMSC-1210 (2016) [2CD] — includes all of the tracks from the albums Dance Time, Let's Dance With Earl Bostic, Alto Magic in Hi-Fi (A Dance Party with Bostic), and Dance Music from the Bostic Workshop
