= Negro Actors Guild of America =

Negro Actors Guild of America, Inc.
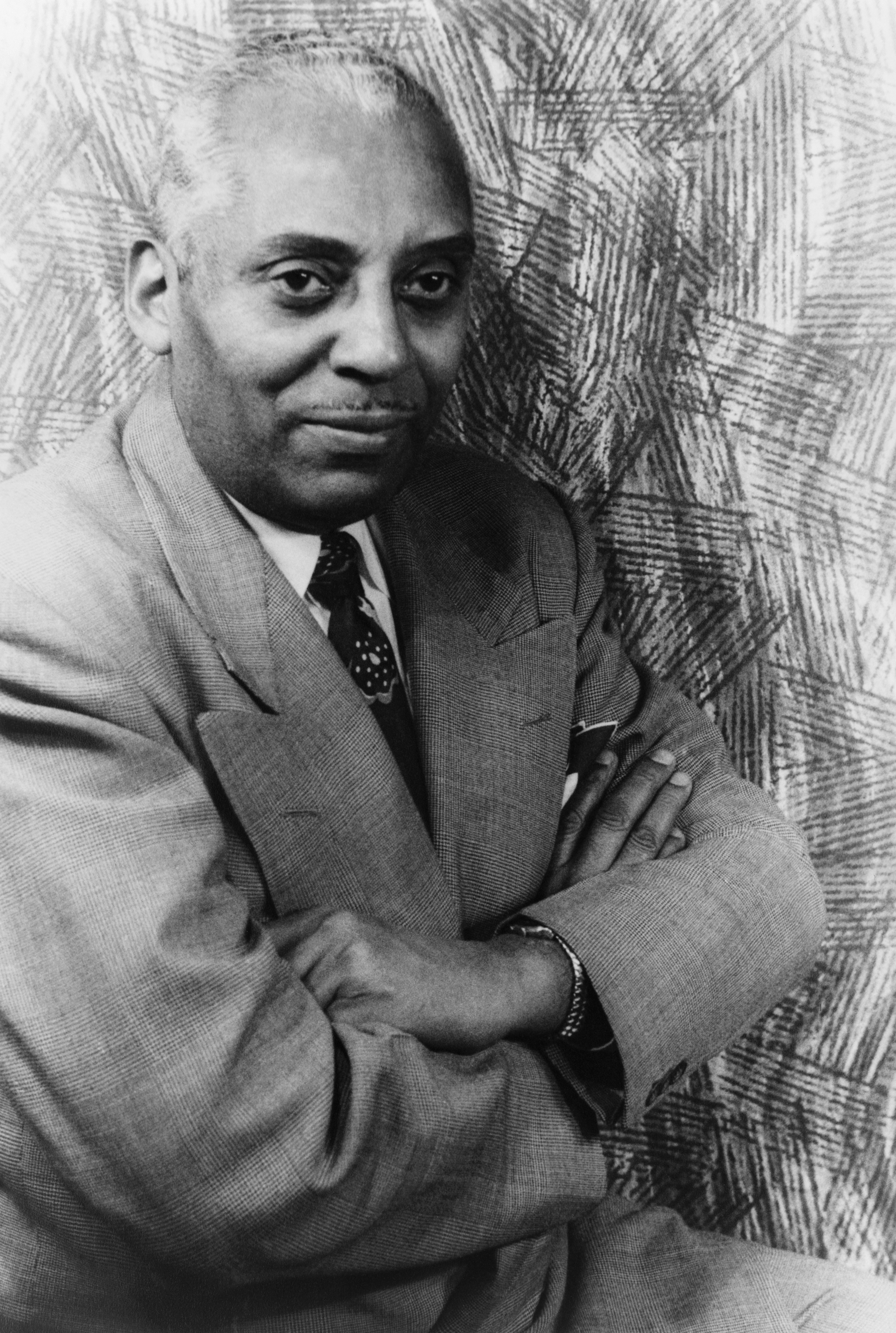
- Noble Sissle, NAG's first president, pictured in 1951.
- Nickname: Negro Actors Guild (NAG)
- Formation: 1936
- Founder: Fredi Washington, W. C. Handy, Paul Robeson, and Ethel Waters
- Dissolved: 1982
- Type: Welfare and benevolent organization for black performers
- Legal status: New York state certificate of incorporation
- Purpose: to give financial aid to entertainers; to eliminate stereotyping, help foster skills, provide support and generate more opportunities for the African American community
- Headquarters: New York City
- Products: The Negro Actor, a quarterly journal, published from 1938-1940
- Services: healthcare, transportation and hotel accommodations, and financing of funeral services for members
- Members: 700+
- President: Noble Sissle
- Key people: Fredi Washington, Executive Director and Bill "Bojangles" Robinson, Honorary President
- Main organ: Executive Board, overseeing six committees: finance, administrative, membership, entertainment, sick and welfare

Negro Actors Guild of America (NAG) was formed in 1936 and began operation in 1937 to create better opportunities for black actors during a period in America where the country was at a crossroads regarding how its citizens of color would be depicted in film, television and the stage.

Formed in New York City, during the Great Depression and the height of the Harlem Renaissance, the NAG sought to give financial aid to Black performers. The NAG also stressed in its formal articles within the Certificate of Incorporation the need for more realistic roles for people of color, helped foster the skills of African American actors, and worked to generate more acting opportunities for the black community in the industry.

The founding members of NAG were Fredi Washington, W. C. Handy, Paul Robeson, and Ethel Waters. Bill "Bojangles" Robinson was named honorary president. Noble Sissle was the first elected president, 1937–1957; followed by Leigh Whipper, 1957–1960; Frederick O'Neal, 1960–1964; Charles "Honi" Coles, 1964-ca. 1980; and James Randolph, 1980–1981.

== History ==
The establishment of the NAG was, in many ways, meant to correct for the errors of other unions. The most obvious was it eliminated the racism of the Actors' Equity Association, which refused membership to Black actors. But it also merged the focus of the Screen Actors Guild (SAG) with the theater focus of Actors' Equity to maximize the number of eligible members. The NAG was also the first Black organization of its kind in the U.S. to receive state incorporation.

NAG founder Fredi Washington was a black stage and film actress who moved to Harlem during the Great Migration. Though her light skin and green eyes helped her "pass" as a white woman, she reveled in her heritage and chose to go against the barriers of stereotypical roles in film for African Americans. Washington was a talented singer and dancer; she became a chorus girl, then an actress, where she traveled all through Europe for her stage productions. She eventually landed a major role in the film Imitation of Life, which ironically, was about a "passing" white woman. Her acting career ended soon after, due to the fact that she was constantly identified with the person she played in the film. Washington dedicated much of her life to the organization, even sacrificing her acting career for the advancement and prosperity of the Guild.

Washington, who was resentful of the limitations of African Americans in the film industry, brought together a talented, diverse group of artists from stage and screen. Members included Noble Sissle, an African-American jazz composer, lyricist, bandleader, singer and playwright. W.C. Handy, an African-American blues composer and musician widely known as the "Father of the Blues", vaudeville novelty act performer Alan Corelli, Leigh Whipper, the first African-American member of the Actors' Equity Association, and Dick Campbell, a key figure in theater and a tireless advocate for black actors in general.

== Structure ==
Noble Sissle served as the organization's first president, while Washington served as the Guild's executive director and secretary. Leigh Whipper succeeded Sissle in 1957 as the Guild's president. He later caused some controversy when he accused Otto Preminger, the director for the film Porgy and Bess, of discriminating against African Americans.

The Guild served as one of the primary financial and social resources for African American entertainers. It provided health care, arranged transportation and hotel accommodations, and financed funeral services for the black thespian community. Much of the funding for the Negro Actors Guild came from the Federal Theater Authority and internal fundraising. Bill “Bojangles” Robinson was instrumental in fundraising efforts, often performing in benefit concerts on Broadway for the Guild. Robinson later served as the Guild's first honorary president

From 1938 to 1940, the Guild published a quarterly journal, "The Negro Actor", which was later replaced by a monthly newsletter, as membership grew, and by the 1940s the Guild had more than seven hundred members. Among their more famous members were Hattie McDaniel, Ethel Waters, Bert Williams, Lena Horne, Sammy Davis Jr. and arts critic Lester Walton.

== Dissolution ==
By the 1970s, the organization slowly faded as the film and theater industries became increasingly integrated. The mishandling of funds and factional infighting led to the Guild's collapse in 1982.

== Archives ==
- The New York Public Library has seven collections of papers or manuscripts relating to NAG
- Black and African American Theatre Resources at the University of Texas Libraries
- Umbra Search is a search tool which contains hundreds of thousands of digitized materials about African-American history and culture that comes from libraries, archives, and special collections nationally.
