= Sweet Tunes of the Sentimental 40s =

Studio album by Earl Bostic & His Orchestra
- Released: 1959
- Genre: Swing jazz
- Label: King Records

Professional ratings
Review scores
Source	Rating
AllMusic	3/5 stars

Sweet Tunes of the Sentimental 40s is a swing album by Earl Bostic & his Orchestra, released in 1959 as King 640.

== Track listing ==
1. "Moonlight in Vermont"
2. "Long Ago and Far Away"
3. "That Old Black Magic"
4. "It Might as Well Be Spring"
5. "I Think of You"
6. "Polonaise (Till the End of Time)"
7. "Full Moon and Empty Arms"
8. "Mam'selle"
9. "Autumn Serenade"
10. "La Vie en Rose"
11. "While We're Young"
12. "I'll Walk Alone"

(note: track order listed incorrectly on some album covers)
