= Otto Hardwick =

American jazz saxophonist (1904–1970)

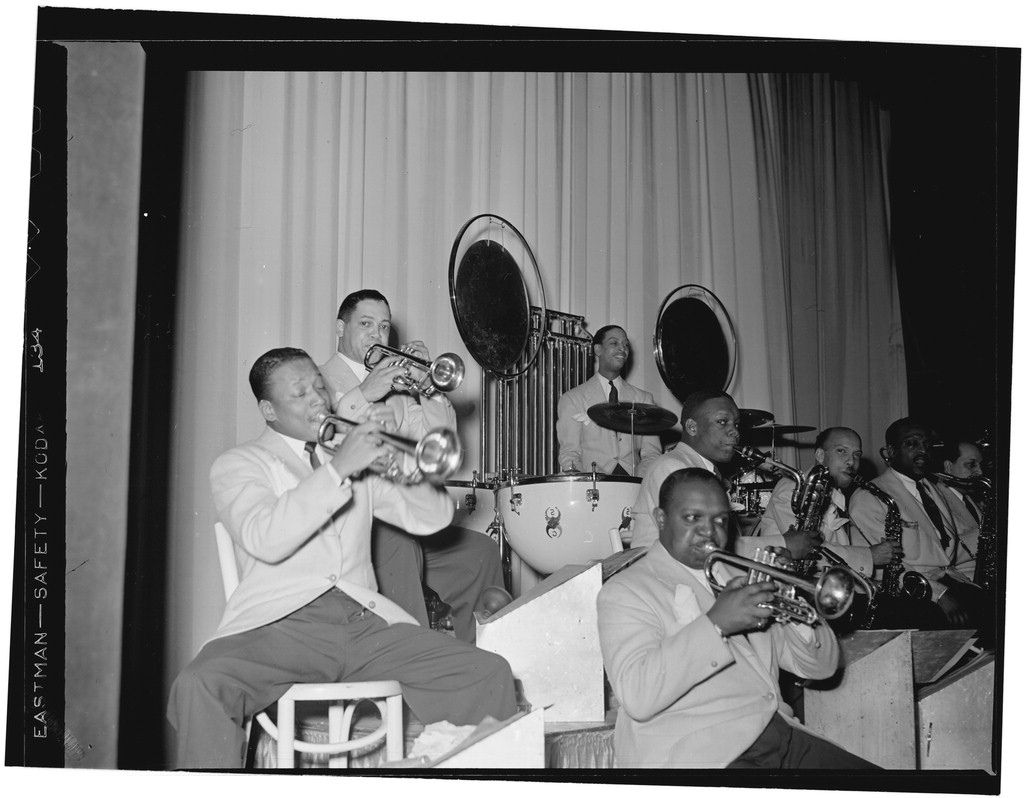
From right: Barney Bigard, Ben Webster, Otto Hardwick, Harry Carney, Rex Stewart, Sonny Greer, Wallace Jones (?), Ray Nance. Photography by William P. Gottlieb.

Otto James "Toby" Hardwicke (May 31, 1904 – August 5, 1970) was an American saxophone player associated with Duke Ellington.

== Biography ==
Hardwick began on string bass at the age of 14, then moved to C melody saxophone and finally settled on alto saxophone. A childhood friend of Duke Ellington, Hardwick joined Ellington's first band in Washington, D.C., in 1919. Hardwick also worked for banjoist Elmer Snowden at Murray's Casino.

In 1923, Ellington, Hardwick, Snowden, trumpeter Arthur Whetsel, and drummer Sonny Greer had success as the Washingtonians in New York City. After a disagreement over money, Snowden was forced out of the band and Duke Ellington was elected as the new leader.

They were booked at a Times Square nightspot called the Kentucky Club for three years where they met Irving Mills, who produced and published Ellington's music.

Hardwick occasionally doubled on violin and string bass in the 1920s, but specialized on alto saxophone. He also played clarinet and bass, baritone and soprano saxophones.

Hardwick left the Duke Ellington band in 1928 to visit Europe, where he played with Noble Sissle, Sidney Bechet and Nekka Shaw's Orchestra, and led his own orchestra before returning to New York City in 1929.

He had a brief stint with Chick Webb (1929), then led his own band at the Hot Feet Club, with Fats Waller leading the rhythm section (1930), led at Small's before rejoining Duke Ellington in the spring of 1932, following a brief stint with Elmer Snowden.

He played lead alto on most Ellington numbers from 1932 to 1946, but he was rarely heard as a soloist because Johnny Hodges performed many of the alto solos. Exceptions are: "Black and Tan Fantasy", "In a Sentimental Mood" and "Sophisticated Lady". Hardwick, with his creamy tone, was almost always the lead alto in the reed section of the Ellington orchestra, except in some situations where Ellington required the more cutting tone of Johnny Hodges' alto to set the tone of the ensemble. After Hardwick's departure (and replacement by Russell Procope) it soon became the norm for Hodges to take the ensemble lead as well as taking the majority of the solos on alto sax.

Hardwick remained with Ellington until May 1946, when he left the band because of Ellington's dislike of Hardwick's girlfriend. Hardwick became a freelance for a short time in the following year, and then retired from music.

In his biography of Ellington, author James Lincoln Collier stated that "In a Sentimental Mood," "Sophisticated Lady," and "Prelude to a Kiss" are adaptations of Hardwick melodies.
