= Wayne Slawson =

A. Wayne Slawson (December 29, 1932 – August 6, 2022) was a composer and professor. He was best known for Wishful Thinking About Winter, composed at MIT in 1967, a computer-generated setting of a haiku that uses a wide range of spectral glide rates.

He died in 2022, aged 89.

== Bibliography ==
- "A Speech-Orientated Synthesizer for Computer Music"
- "Sound, Electronics, and Hearing", The Development and Practice of Electronic Music. Jon H. Appleton and Ronald Perera, eds. ISBN 9780132076050.

== Discography ==
- Wishful Thinking About Winter. Decca DL 710180.
