= Muriel Rahn =

American vocalist and actress

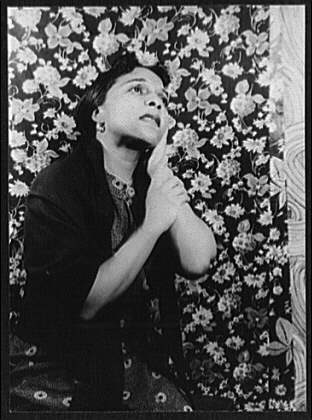
- Muriel Rahn as Cora in The Barrier. Photograph by Carl Van Vechten.
- Born: Muriel Ellen Rahn; June 12, 1911; Boston, Massachusetts, United States
- Died: August 8, 1961 (aged 50); New York City, United States
- Occupations: singer, actor, musical director
- Years active: 1929–1961
- Spouse(s): Charles Rountree (divorced); Dick Campbell (c. 1932–1961)

Muriel Ellen Rahn (1911–1961) was an American vocalist and actress. She co-founded the Rose McClendon Players with her husband, Dick Campbell and was one of the leading black concert singers of the mid-20th century. She is perhaps best known for her starring role in the original Broadway production of Carmen Jones. Rahn also served as musical director of the German State Theater in Frankfurt.

== Biography ==
Muriel Ellen Rahn was born in Boston in 1911, the daughter of Willie and Elizabeth "Bessie" Rahn (née Smith). After her father died, she moved with her mother to New York City, where Bessie met and married Cornelius M. Battey, who became director of photography of the Tuskegee Institute in Alabama. Muriel finished her high school at Tuskegee, then attended Atlanta University before earning a degree from the Music Conservatory of the University of Nebraska–Lincoln. She was also educated at Columbia University and studied voice at Juilliard School of Music.

In 1929, she launched her professional career in New York City. One of her earlier appearances on Broadway was in the musical Come of Age, written and staged by Clamence Dane with music by Richard Addinsell.

In 1950, Rahn made one of her later appearances on Broadway. Opposite operatic legend Lawrence Tibbett, she played the role of Cora Lewis in the musical The Barrier, based on the play Mulatto by Langston Hughes.

Later stage credits included the off-Broadway production of Sara Reavin's melodrama The Ivory Branch with Diana Barrymore. In 1959, Rahn became the first black musical director of the Städtische Bühnen Frankfurt, Germany.

Rahn died on August 8, 1961, at Sydenham Hospital in New York City from lung cancer.

== Selected credits ==
=== Theatre ===
Year	Production	Role	Theatre(s)	Notes
1956	The Ivory Branch.		Provincetown Playhouse	
1950	The Barrier	Cora Lewis	Broadhurst Theatre	
1943	Carmen Jones	Carmen	Broadway Theatre	Alternated lead role with Muriel Smith
1942	The Pirate	Lizarda	Martin Beck Theatre	
1939	Swingin’ the Dream	Singer	Center Theatre	
1934	Come of Age	An Entertainer	Maxine Elliott's Theatre	

=== Television ===
Year	Series	Role	Notes
1958	The Arlene Francis Show	Herself	
1957	Hallmark Hall of Fame	Zipporah	A production of The Green Pastures
1952	Hollywood Screen Test		
1951	The Ed Sullivan Show	Herself	

=== Motion Pictures ===
Year	Title	Role	Distributor	Notes
1934	King for a Day (short)	Herself		
