= Tricky Sam Nanton =

American jazz trombonist (1904–1946)

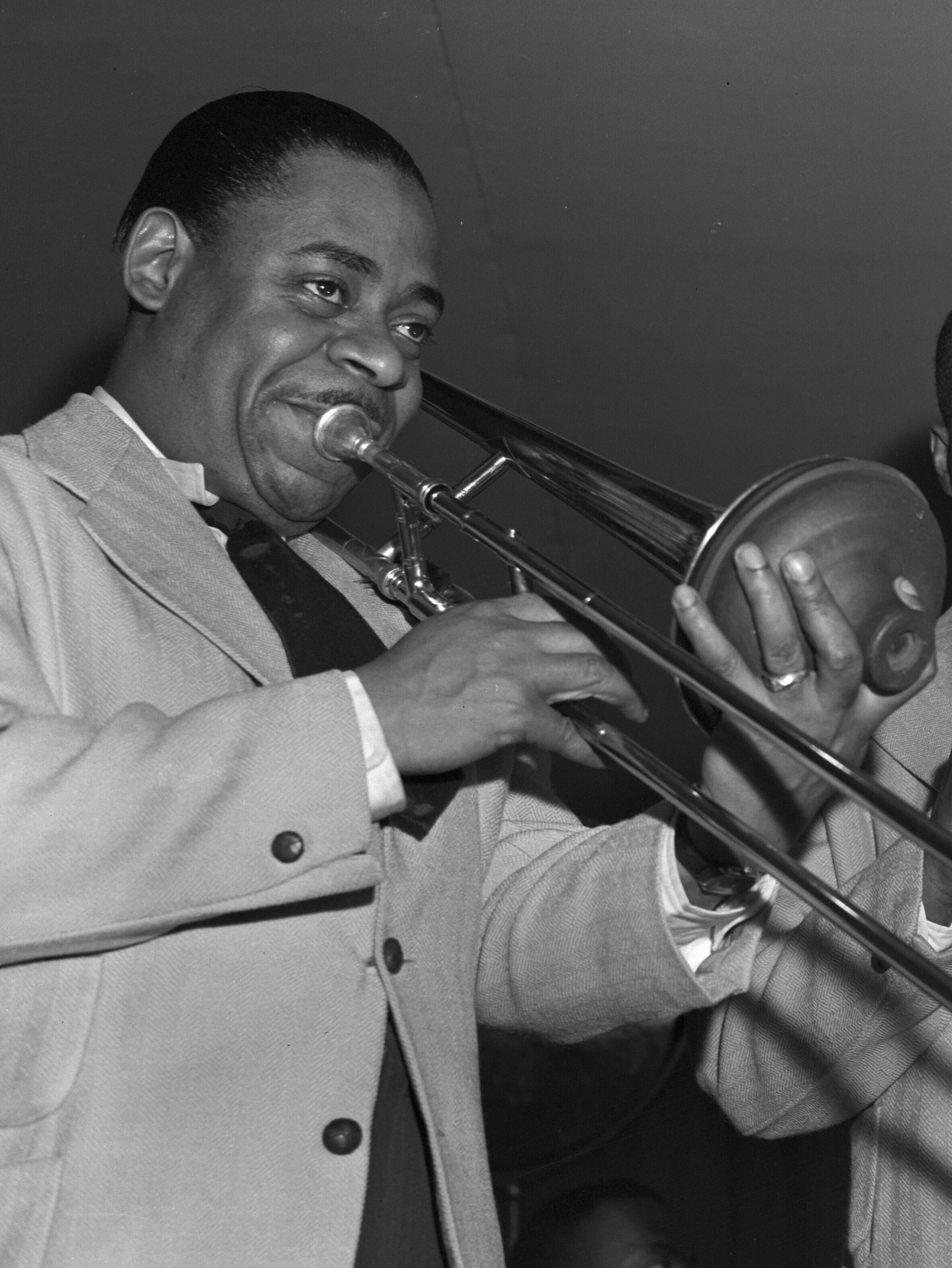
- Nanton performing in 1943

Background information
- Born: Joseph Irish Nanton; February 1, 1904; New York City, U.S.
- Died: July 20, 1946 (aged 42) San Francisco, California, U.S.
- Genres: Jazz, swing
- Occupation: Musician
- Instrument: Trombone
- Formerly of: Duke Ellington Orchestra

Joe "Tricky Sam" Nanton (February 1, 1904 – July 20, 1946) was an American trombonist with the Duke Ellington Orchestra. A pioneer of the plunger mute, Nanton is notable for his use of the distinctive wah-wah effect.

== Early life ==
He was born Joseph Irish Nanton in New York City, United States. His parents were John Barzly Nanton and Emily Irish, both immigrants from the British West Indies.

Nanton began playing professionally in Washington, D.C., with bands led by Cliff Jackson and banjoist Elmer Snowden.

From 1923 to 1924, Nanton worked with Frazier's Harmony Five. A year later, he performed with Snowden. At the age of 22, Nanton found his niche in Duke Ellington's Orchestra, when he reluctantly took the place of his friend Charlie Irvis in 1926, and remained with Ellington until his early death in 1946. Nanton, along with Lawrence Brown, anchored the trombone section.

== The wah-wah sound ==
Nanton was one of the great pioneers of the plunger mute. In 1921, he heard Johnny Dunn playing the trumpet with a plunger, which Nanton realized could be used to similar effect on the trombone. Together with Ellington's trumpeter Bubber Miley, Nanton is largely responsible for creating the characteristic wah-wah, or wa-wa, effect. Their highly expressive growl and plunger sounds were the main ingredient in the band's early "jungle" sound, that evolved during the band's late 1920s engagement at Harlem's Cotton Club. According to Barney Bigard, Nanton "grabbed his plunger. He could use that thing, too. It talked to you. I was sitting there, looking up at him, and every time he'd say 'wa-wa,' I was saying 'wa-wa' with my mouth, following him all the way through." Sensing Nanton's impressive manual dexterity, the jovial alto saxophonist Otto Hardwick, ever inclined to tag friends with fitting nicknames, dubbed Nanton "Tricky Sam": "anything to save himself trouble—he was tricky that way."

From his early days with the Ellington band, Nanton was featured regularly. But he and Miley worked especially well in combination, often playing in harmony or "playing off each other" (embellishing and developing the musical theme of the preceding soloist into one's own new musical idea). Nanton and Miley successfully incorporated plunger skills into their playing to evoke moods, people, or images.

The celebrated brass growl effect was vividly described by Duke Ellington's son, Mercer Ellington:

There are three basic elements in the growl: the sound of the horn, a guttural gargling in the throat, and the actual note that is hummed. The mouth has to be shaped to make the different vowel sounds, and above the singing from the throat, manipulation of the plunger adds the wa-wa accents that give the horn a language. I should add that in the Ellington tradition a straight mute is used in the horn besides a plunger outside, and this results in more pressure. Some players use only the plunger, and then the sound is usually coarser, less piercing, and not as well articulated.

Nanton and Miley gave the Ellington Orchestra the reputation of being one of the "dirtiest" jazz groups. Many listeners were excited by the raunchy, earthy sounds of their growls and mutes. Among the best examples of their style are "East St. Louis Toodle-oo", "The Blues I Love to Sing", "Black and Tan Fantasy", "Goin' to Town", and "Doin' the Voom-Voom". After Miley's premature departure in 1929, Nanton taught Cootie Williams, Miley's successor, some of the growl and plunger techniques that Miley had used. Williams became a plunger virtuoso in his own right and helped the band retain its distinctive sound. The sounds they created were copied by many brass soloists in the swing era.

While other brass players became adept at growl and plunger techniques, Nanton's sound was all his own. He developed, in addition to other tricks in his bag, a "ya-ya" effect with a plunger, in combination with a Magosy & Buscher nonpareil trumpet straight mute. He kept the details of his technique a secret, even from his band mates, until his premature death.

Some ingredients in Nanton's unique "ya-ya" sound, however, are known: inserting a trumpet straight mute into the bell, using a large plumber's plunger outside the bell, and "speaking" into the instrument while playing. This sort of speaking involved changing the cavity of the mouth while silently reproducing different vowel sounds without actually vibrating the vocal cords. His palette of near-vocal sounds was radical for its time and helped produce the unique voicings in Ellington compositions, such as "The Mooche" "Black and Tan Fantasy", and "Mood Indigo".

== Death ==
Nanton died from a stroke in San Francisco, California, on July 20, 1946, while on tour with the Ellington Orchestra. His death was an enormous loss for the Ellington Orchestra. While later trombonists, including Tyree Glenn and Quentin Jackson, tried to duplicate Tricky Sam's plunger techniques, no one was able to completely replicate his sound. Nanton had a wide variety of expressions, and his intricate techniques were not well documented.
