= Wallace Jones (musician) =

American jazz trumpeter (1906–1983)

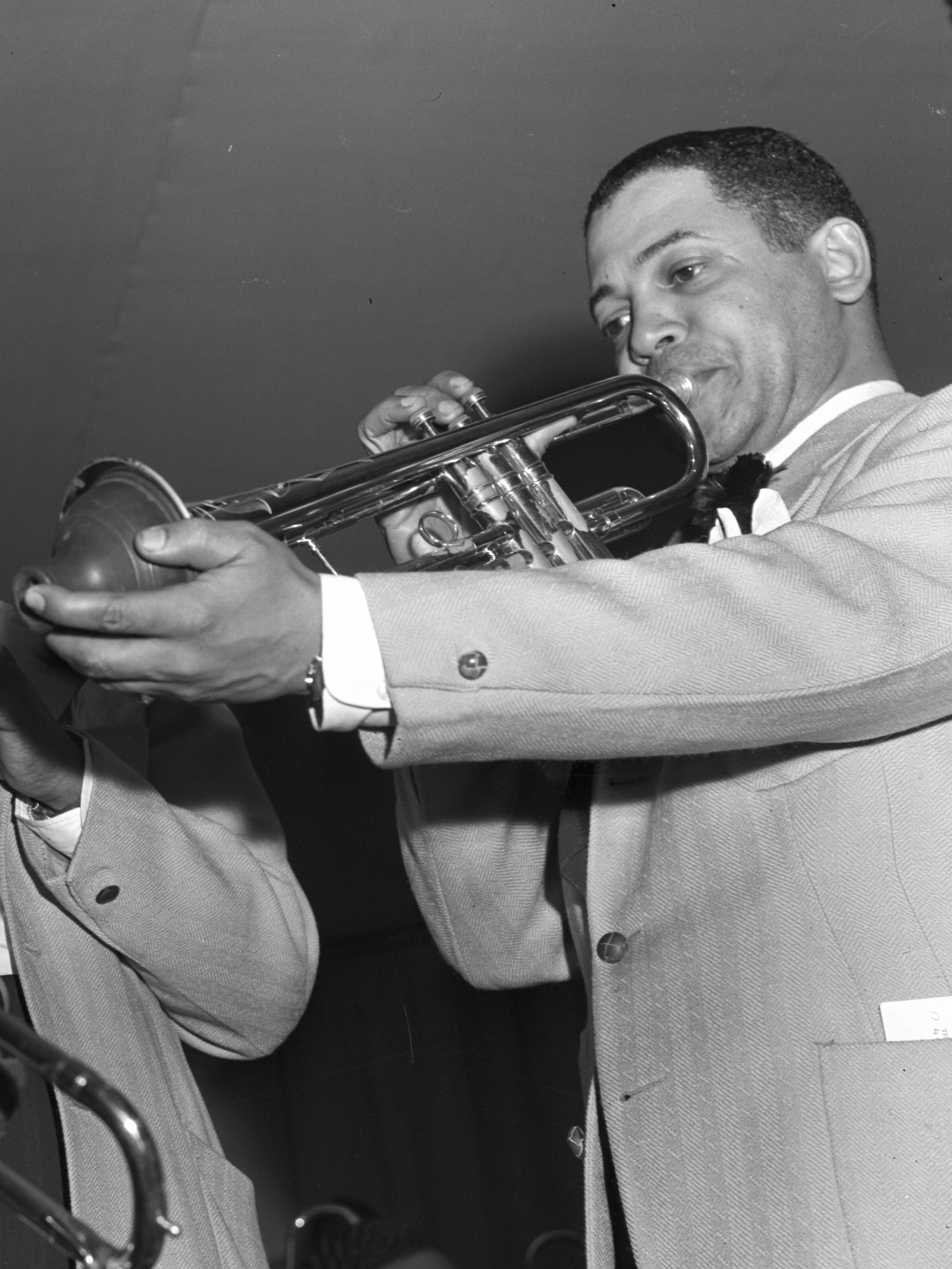
Jones in 1943

Wallace Leon Jones (November 16, 1906, Baltimore, Maryland – March 23, 1983, New York City) was an American jazz trumpeter.

Jones played in local Maryland bands such as Ike Dixon's Harmony Birds and Percy Glascoe's Kit Kat Orchestra early in his career. He moved to New York City around 1935, where he worked with Chick Webb, who was his cousin. He joined Willie Bryant's ensemble and recorded with Putney Dandridge and Duke Ellington, and the latter where he was credited on clarinet, trombone and trumpet. He was a trumpeter in Ellington's Orchestra from 1938 to 1944 and 3 of the tripled instrumentations happening in this timeframe, replacing Arthur Whetsel, and appeared in several sound films with them, including Cabin in the Sky (1943). After this association, he recorded with Ellington again in 1947, and also worked with Benny Carter, Snub Mosley, and John Kirby, but had left music by the end of the 1940s.
