= Creole Love Call =

Song by Duke Ellington
- Published: 1927 by Gotham Music Service
- Genre: jazz standard
- Composer: Duke Ellington

"Creole Love Call" is a 1927 jazz standard by Duke Ellington, Bubber Miley and Rudy Jackson. The song is associated with vocalist Adelaide Hall. The song entered the Billboard USA song charts in 1928 at No. 19.

In 1988, during a radio interview with the journalist and radio host Max Jones, Hall explained how she came up with the counter-melody in "Creole Love Call". An excerpt from the interview can be heard in the British Library article (published 17 December 2020) on the British Library blog titled Oral History of Jazz in Britain.

== See also ==
- List of 1920s jazz standards
