= Carmen Jones =

1943 Broadway musical

- 1944 Original Cast Recording
- Music: Georges Bizet
- Lyrics: Oscar Hammerstein II
- Book: Oscar Hammerstein II
- Basis: Carmen by Georges Bizet; Henri Meilhac; Ludovic Halévy; Carmen by Prosper Mérimée
- Productions: 1943 Broadway; 1945 Broadway; 1946 Broadway; 1949 Greek Theatre; 1954 Film version 1991 Old Vic; 2007 Royal Festival Hall; 2018 Off-Broadway
- Awards: Laurence Olivier Award for Best New Musical

Carmen Jones is a 1943 Broadway musical with music by Georges Bizet (orchestrated for Broadway by Robert Russell Bennett) and lyrics and book by Oscar Hammerstein II which was performed at The Broadway Theatre. Conceptually, it is Bizet's opera Carmen updated to a World War II-era, African-American setting. Bizet's opera was, in turn, based on the 1846 novella by Prosper Mérimée. The Broadway musical was produced by Billy Rose, using an all-black cast, and directed by Hassard Short. Robert Shaw prepared the choral portions of the show.

The original Broadway production starred Muriel Smith (alternating with Muriel Rahn) in the title role. The original Broadway cast members were nearly all new to the stage; Kennedy and Muir each wrote that on the first day of rehearsal only one member had ever been on a stage before this musical.

The 1954 film was adapted by Hammerstein and Harry Kleiner. It was directed by Otto Preminger and starred Dorothy Dandridge and Harry Belafonte.

The musical has been revived in London, running for a season in 1991 at Old Vic and most recently in Royal Festival Hall in the Southbank Centre in 2007.

In 2018, it was revived off-Broadway at the Classic Stage Company under the direction of John Doyle and Anika Noni Rose in the title role.

== Plot ==
Parachute maker Carmen Jones makes a play for a "fly boy" Air Force man, Joe, who is in love with sweet Cindy Lou and about to marry her on a day pass when Carmen gets into a fight with another woman.

Joe's pass is cancelled in order for him to drive her to the next town to be handed over to the non-military police. Instead, Carmen charms him and escapes, and he is put in the stockade for not delivering her to the authorities.

While Carmen waits for Joe to be released from military prison, she hangs around Billy Pastor's jive cafe where she encounters boxer Husky Miller, who is instantly besotted with Carmen, calling her "heatwave".

Carmen initially is uninterested, but her friends Frankie and Mert know that their invitation from Husky's manager to see him fight in Chicago depends on Carmen's being there, too.

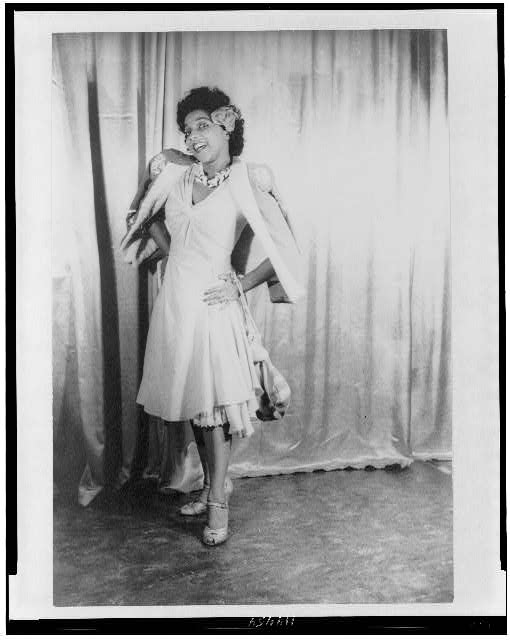
Muriel Rahn (age 32) in the title role in the 1943 original Broadway production of Carmen Jones

Joe, having been released from the stockade, turns up at the cafe the same evening. At first, his prospects seem to be looking up, as his connections have put Joe back on track for aviator school. Carmen lays down a guilt trip, protesting that a long-distance relationship with Joe 400 miles (640 km) away at school just isn't what she had in mind. He immediately gets into a fight with his sergeant, who is making a move on Carmen, as well as putting pressure on Joe. Starting the fight would have been enough to put Joe back in military prison for years, but the fight goes badly, and the sergeant ends up apparently dead. Carmen makes Joe hide the body because desertion seems better than a lengthy sentence.

The train ticket to Chicago originally given to Carmen offers them a way of avoiding the MPs. After a few days hiding in a seedy hotel with no money and no future with Joe, Carmen pays a visit to her two friends, now covered in diamonds and furs, at Husky's training camp. She only is looking for a loan, but they try to draw her to give up Joe and "go with the money" by staying with Husky.

Later, at Husky's apartment, Frankie reads Carmen's "cards", and reveals the nine of spades - the card of death. In the belief that her days are numbered, Carmen gives in to Husky's advances, abandoning Joe for the luxurious life Husky can offer her.

Cindy Lou comes to look for Joe, but he is still in love with Carmen and spurns Cindy Lou. The night of Husky's title fight, Joe tries to convince Carmen to return to him, but when she rejects him, he kills her, thus making the card's prophecy a reality.

== Music ==
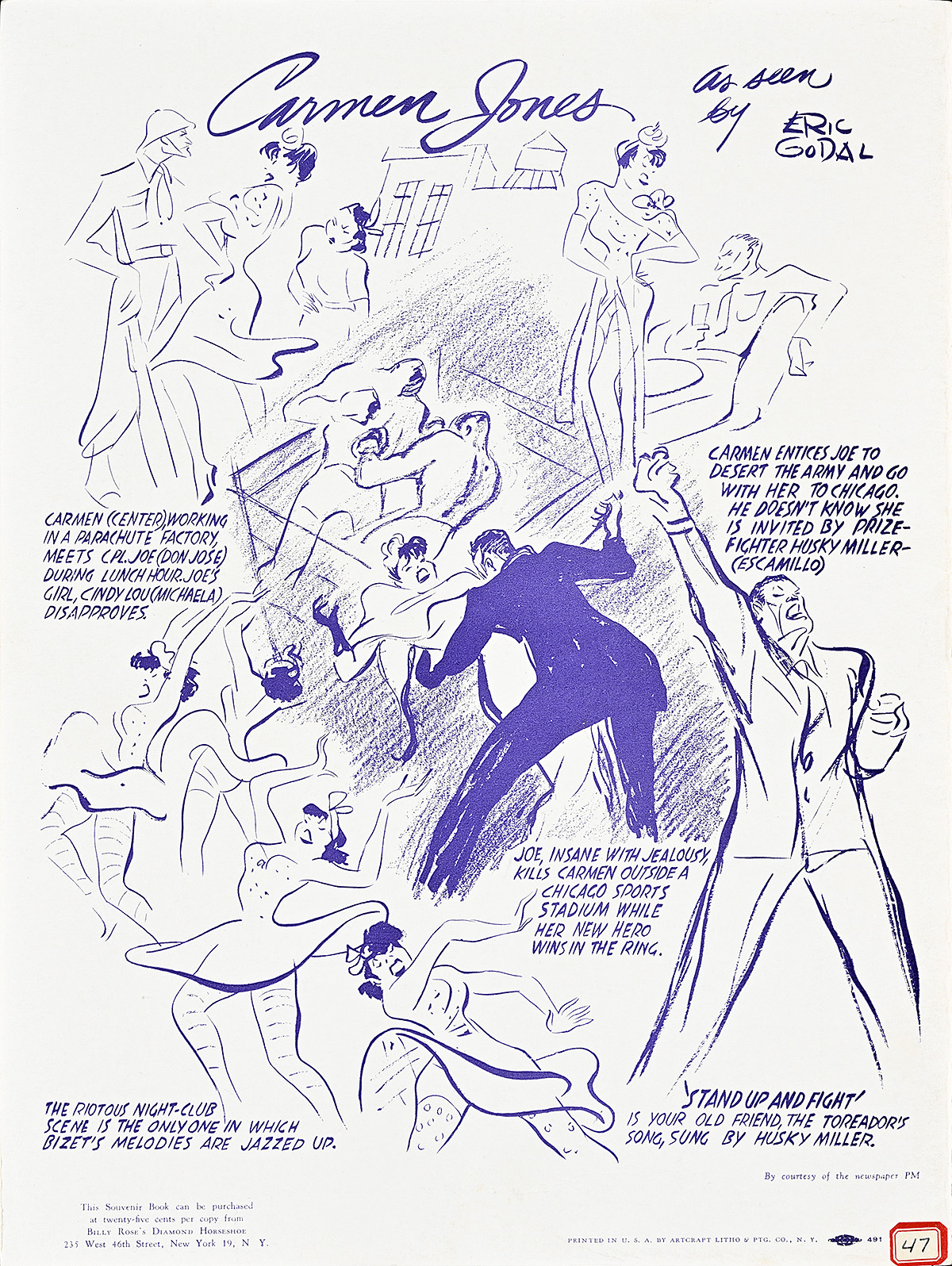
An Erich Godal cartoon for the New York newspaper PM summarizes key plot points and shows how the characters parallel those of Bizet's Carmen.

Oscar Hammerstein II heavily adapted the libretto for Georges Bizet's opera Carmen from the original French for his Broadway production. Arts and Entertainment Editor Elisabeth Vincentelli clarifies:

"The music was pretty much left intact, but Hammerstein transferred the action to World War II America. Carmen's tobacco factory became Carmen Jones' parachute factory, bullfighter Escamillo became boxer Husky Miller, and so on. As if this weren't enough, there also was the 'small' detail of casting the show only with African-Americans...many of the show's songs retain a surprising impact. The feverish intensity of 'Beat Out dat Rhythm on a Drum', for instance, hasn't dimmed over the years, and the song's been covered by a wide variety of performers, from Pearl Bailey and Marc Almond to Mandy Patinkin."

The majority of the actors performing the songs in the film Carmen Jones were dubbed. Even singer Harry Belafonte was dubbed by LeVern Hutcherson, and Dorothy Dandridge was dubbed by Marilyn Horne (long before Horne became a well-known opera singer).

== Songs ==
Act 1

- Overture
- Lift 'Em Up and Put 'Em Down (Avec la garde montante in Bizet's original opera) – Street Boys
- Honey Gal o' Mine – Male Chorus
- Good Luck, Mr. Flyin' Man! – Female Chorus
- Dat's Love (Habanera in Bizet's opera) – Carmen and Chorus
- You Talk Just like My Maw (Parle-moi de ma mère in Bizet's opera)– Joe and Cindy Lou
- Murder-Murder – Female Chorus
- Carmen Jones Is Goin' to Jail! – Pit Chorus
- Dere's a Cafe on de Corner (Seguidilla in Bizet's opera) – Carmen and Joe
- Beat Out Dat Rhythm on a Drum (Gypsy Song in Bizet's opera) – Frankie, Chorus
- Stan' Up and Fight (Toreador Song, also known as March of the Toreadors in Bizet's opera) – Husky Miller and Chorus
- Whizzin' Away Along de Track (Quintet (Nous avons en tête une affaire) in Bizet's opera) – Rum, Dink, Myrt, Frankie, and Carmen
- Dis Flower (Flower Song in Bizet's opera) – Joe
- If You Would Only Come Away – Carmen and Joe

Act 2

- De Cards Don't Lie (Card Song in Bizet's opera) – Frankie, Myrt, Carmen, and female chorus
- Dat Ol' Boy – Carmen
- Poncho de Panther from Brazil – Frankie, Myrt, Husky Miller, Rum, and Chorus
- My Joe (Micaela's Air in Bizet's opera) – Cindy Lou
- Finale (of Act II Scene I) – Carmen, Joe, Cindy Lou, Husky Miller, Rum, Dink, Frankie, and Myrt
- Git Yer Program for de Big Fight – Chorus
- Dat's Our Man! (Les voici in Bizet's opera) – Chorus
- Finale – Carmen, Joe, Chorus

== Awards and nominations ==
=== Original London production ===
Year	Award	Category	Nominee	Result
1992	Laurence Olivier Award	Best New Musical		Won
1992	Laurence Olivier Award	Best Actor in a Musical	Damon Evans	Nominated
1992	Laurence Olivier Award	Best Actress in a Musical	Wilhelmenia Fernandez	Won
1992	Laurence Olivier Award	Best Actress in a Musical	Sharon Benson	Nominated
1992	Laurence Olivier Award	Best Performance in a Supporting Role in a Musical	Gregg Baker	Nominated
1992	Laurence Olivier Award	Best Performance in a Supporting Role in a Musical	Karen Parks	Nominated

== See also ==
- African American musical theater
- Orson Welles' Macbeth, conceptual black casting theatre production, 1936.

== Bibliography ==
- Kennedy, Michael Patrick; Muir, John (1998) [1997]. Musicals (Updated reprint ed.). HarperCollins. ISBN 0-00-472067-9.
