= Wah-wah (music) =

Musical effect

The Wah-wah effect on a guitar

Wah-wah (or wa-wa) is an imitative word (or onomatopoeia) for the sound of altering the resonance of musical notes to extend expressiveness, sounding much like a human voice saying the syllable wah. The wah-wah effect is a spectral glide, a "modification of the vowel quality of a tone".

Ultimate-Guitar opined that the effect is "one of the most original and easily identified guitar effects in the world."

== Etymology ==
The word is derived from the sound of the effect itself; an imitative or onomatopoeia word. The effect's "wa-wa" sound was noted by jazz player Barney Bigard when he heard Tricky Sam Nanton use the effect on his trombone in the early 1920s.

== History ==
=== Acoustic ===
The wah-wah effect is believed to have originated in the 1920s, with brass instrument players finding they could produce an expressive crying tone by moving a mute, or plunger, in and out of the instrument's bell. In 1921, trumpet player Johnny Dunn's use of this style inspired Tricky Sam Nanton to use the mute with the trombone.

=== Electronic ===
By the early 1960s, the sound of the acoustic technique had been emulated with electronic circuitry. For electric guitar the wah-wah pedal was invented.

The first wah-wah pedal was created by Bradley J. Plunkett at Warwick Electronics Inc./Thomas Organ Company in November 1966.

== Technique ==
The method of production varies from one type of instrument to another. On brass instruments, it is usually created by means of a mute, particularly with the harmon (also called a "wa-wa" mute) or plunger mute. Woodwind instruments may use "false fingerings" to produce the effect.

Any electrified instrument may use an auxiliary signal-processing device, or pedal. Often it is controlled by movement of the player's foot on a rocking pedal connected to a potentiometer. An alternative to players directly controlling the amount of effect is an 'auto-wah'. These devices, usually make harder hit notes more trembly with a more prominent wah wah effect. Wah-wah effects are often used for soloing or for creating a "wacka-wacka" funk rhythm on guitar. Although these electronic means are most often on electric guitar, they are also often used on electric piano.

== Theory ==
The wah-wah effect is produced by periodically bringing in and out of play treble frequencies while a note is sustained. Therefore, the effect is a type of spectral glide, a "modification of the vowel quality of a tone".

The Electronic wah-wah effects are produced by controlling tone filters with a pedal. An envelope follower circuit is used in the 'auto-wah'. Subtractive synthesis can produce a similar effect.

== Notable uses ==
Tricky Sam Nanton's wah-wah on trombone in Duke Ellington's Orchestra became well known as part of the so-called "jungle" effects of the band in the late 1920s. This technique has been used in contemporary music. Karlheinz Stockhausen notates the use of the wah-wah mute in his Punkte (1952/1962) in terms of transitions between open to close using open and closed circles connected by a line. Although the most common method of producing wah-wah on brass instruments is with a mute, some players have used electronic filtering, notably Miles Davis on trumpet.

== See also ==
- Wah-wah pedal
- Muted trumpet
- Mute (music)
- Subtractive synthesis
- Porn groove
