= Black and Tan Fantasy =

1927 jazz composition

Single by Duke Ellington and his Washingtonians
- Published: 1927 by Gotham Music Services
- Recorded: April–November 1927
- Genre: Jazz; big band
- Songwriters: Duke Ellington; Bubber Miley

"Black and Tan Fantasy" is a 1927 jazz composition by Duke Ellington and Bubber Miley. The song was recorded several times by Ellington and his Cotton Club band in 1927 for the Brunswick, Victor, and Okeh record labels. (Note: Brunswick – April 7, 1927, Victor – October 26, 1927, Okeh – November 3, 1927)

The song was featured and performed by Ellington and his orchestra in the 1929 RKO short film Black and Tan.

The copyright was registered on July 16, 1927, and the song entered the public domain on January 1, 2023. The three 1927 recordings will not enter the public domain until 2049. In June 2026, CBS News included the song in its list of the 250 essential American songs of the past 250 years.

== Composition ==
Trumpeter Bubber Miley cited a spiritual his mother would sing to him as a child as a major influence on the composition. The piece, titled "Hosanna", is heavily related to a melody from the Stephen Adams piece "The Holy City."

The piece begins in B♭ minor, modulating to B♭ major after a twelve-bar blues introduction. Ellington historian Mark Tucker describes it as "immediately [plunging] the listener into a dark, slightly forbidding tonal atmostphere." Following solos, the piece ends with a reference to Frédéric Chopin's Piano Sonata No. 2 – a funeral march.

Sociologist David Grazian remarks that the piece's influences include the Blues music of the Deep South along with elements of Harlem's signature jazz sound, such as muted trumpets and stride piano.

Musician and historian Gunther Schuller points out that Miley provided "the main creative thrust" for "Black and Tan Fantasy," along with many of the orchestra's mid-1920s output:

Miley is in fact officially listed as co-composer of many of Ellington's early works. In many of these pieces, the best, the most original, the most striking material comes from Miley, while the more ordinary sections, hailing more from a kind of Broadway show-tune world, come from Ellington. Black and Tan Fantasy, dating from 1927, is a good illustration of this.

== Recordings ==
The piece has been recorded numerous times by both Ellington as well as other artists. Some notable recordings include:

=== Victor recording ===
"Black and Tan Fantasie"
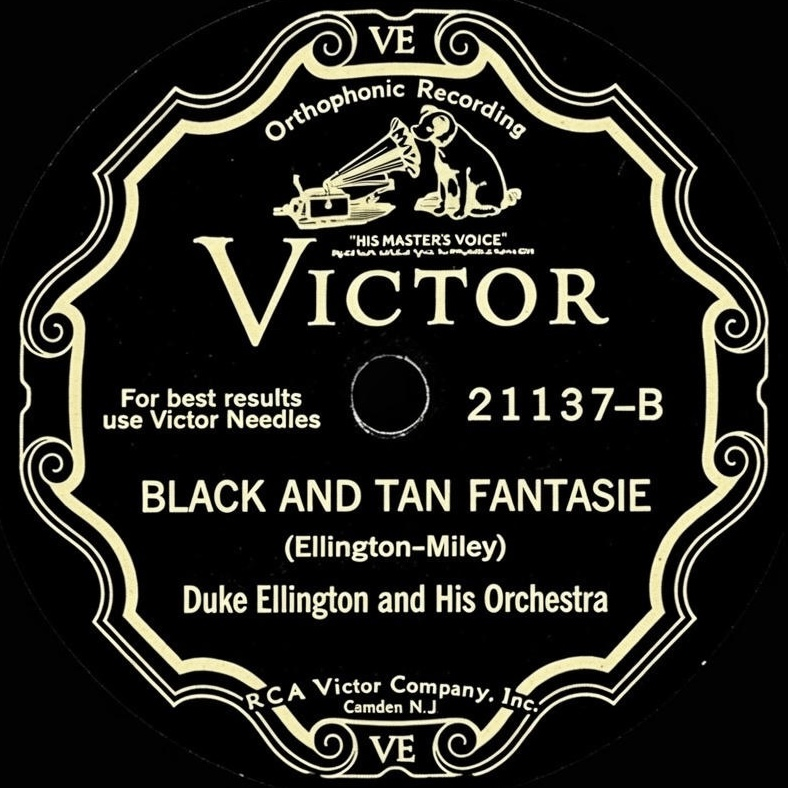

Single by Duke Ellington and His Orchestra
- A-side: "Creole Love Call"
- Released: February 3, 1928
- Recorded: October 26, 1927; Camden, New Jersey
- Studio: Victor Studios
- Genre: Jazz
- Length: 3:07
- Label: Victor 21137-B
- Songwriters: Duke Ellington; Bubber Miley

The Victor recording of "Black and Tan Fantasy" (titled "Black and Tan Fantasie" on the original Victor release) was recorded on October 26, 1927, at the Victor Talking Machine Company studios in Camden, New Jersey, and released on February 3, 1928, as the B-side of "Creole Love Call" (Victor 21137-A).

This version, featuring Bubber Miley's growl trumpet and Joe "Tricky Sam" Nanton's trombone plunger work, is widely regarded as the definitive 1920s recording of the composition.

The Victor recording was inducted into the Grammy Hall of Fame in 1981.

=== Duke Ellington (1927–1942) ===
- April 7, 1927 E-22299 issued on Brunswick 3526, Brunswick 6682, Brunswick 80002, Melotone M-12093, Polk P-9006, Vocalion 15556
- October 6, 1927 BVE-40155-2 probably unissued
- October 26, 1927 BVE-40155-4 Victor 21137, Victor 24861, Victor 68-0837 (as "Black & Tan Fantasie")
- November 3, 1927 W 81776-A Columbia (LP) C3L-27
- November 3, 1927 W 81776-B OKeh 40955
- November 3, 1927 W 81776-C OKeh 8521, OK 40955
- June 12, 1930 150590-1 Clarion 5331-C, Diva 6056-G, Velvet Tone 7082-V
- February 9, 1932 71836-2 (part of a three song medley), Victor Transcription L-16007
- February 9, 1932 71837-1 and 2 Victor rejected
- January 13, 1938 M-714-1 (greatly expanded arrangement as Prologue to Black and Tan Fantasy), Brunswick m8256
- January 13, 1938 M-715-1 (greatly expanded arrangement as The New Black and Tan Fantasy), Brunswick m8063

== Sources ==
- Brooks, Earl H. (2024). On Rhetoric and Black Music. Detroit, Michigan: Wayne State University Press. ISBN 978-0-8143-4649-5.
- Ellington, Duke; Miley, Bub; Powell, Eddie (1927). Black and tan fantasy : fox-trot. Arranged for big band by Eddie Powell. New York City: Gotham Music Service – via Internet Archive.
- Haskins, James (1984). The Cotton Club. New York: New American Library. ISBN 978-0-452-25598-2 – via Internet Archive.
- Schuller, Gunther (1992). "Jazz and Composition: The Many Sides of Duke Ellington, the Music's Greatest Composer". Bulletin of the American Academy of Arts and Sciences. 46 (1): 36–51. doi:10.2307/3824163. ISSN 0002-712X. JSTOR 3824163.
- Tucker, Mark, ed. (1993). "Roger Pryor Dodge on Black and Tan Fantasy, from "Harpsichords and Jazz Trumpets" (1934)". The Duke Ellington Reader. Oxford University Press. ISBN 978-0-19-509391-9.
  - Originally printed as: Dodge, Roger Pryor (July–September 1934). "Harpsichords and Jazz Trumpets". Hound & Horn. pp. 602–606.
- Tucker, Mark (1995) [1991]. Ellington: The Early Years. University of Illinois Press. ISBN 978-0-252-06509-5.
