= Elmer Snowden =

American jazz banjoist and guitarist (1900–1973)

- Born: Elmer Chester Snowden; October 9, 1900; Baltimore, Maryland, U.S.
- Died: May 14, 1973 (aged 72) Philadelphia, Pennsylvania, U.S.
- Genres: Jazz
- Instruments: Banjo, guitar

Elmer Chester Snowden (October 9, 1900 – May 14, 1973) was an American banjo player of the Jazz Age. He also played guitar and, in the early stages of his career, all the reed instruments. He contributed greatly to jazz in its early days as both a player and a bandleader, and launched the careers of many top musicians.

== Biography ==
Elmer Snowden was born in Baltimore, Maryland, United States, to Gertude Snowden, and had a brother, James. His mother worked as a laundress, but by the time of the 1917 World War I draft registration, a month before his 17th birthday, he was already listing his occupation as "musician," while living with his mother, and the 1920 Federal Census lists him still living at home, employed as a "musician in a dance hall."

Snowden was the original leader of the Washingtonians, a group he brought to New York City from the capital in 1923. Unable to gain a booking, Snowden sent for Duke Ellington, who was with the group when it recorded three test sides for Victor that were never issued. Ellington eventually took over leadership of the band, which contained the nucleus of what later became his orchestra.

Snowden was also a renowned band leader – Count Basie, Jimmie Lunceford, Bubber Miley, "Tricky Sam" Nanton, Frankie Newton, Benny Carter, Rex Stewart, Roy Eldridge and Chick Webb are among the musicians who worked in his bands.

Very active in the 1920s as an agent and musician, Snowden at one time had five bands playing under his name in New York, one of which was led by pianist Cliff Jackson. Most of his bands were not recorded, but a Snowden band that included Eldridge, Al Sears, Dicky Wells and Sid Catlett appeared in a Vitaphone Varieties short film, Smash Your Baggage (1932).

Although Snowden continued to be musically active throughout his life, after the mid-1930s, with the retirement of his long-time musical partner Bob Fuller, his career was one of relative obscurity in New York. He continued to play through to the 1950s, but outside the limelight. After a dispute with the musicians' union in New York, he moved to Philadelphia, where he taught music, counting among his pupils pianist Ray Bryant, his brother, bassist Tommy Bryant, and saxophonist Sahib Shihab, originally known as Edmond Gregory.

Snowden was working as a parking lot attendant in 1959 when Chris Albertson, then a Philadelphia disc jockey, came across him. In 1960, Albertson brought Snowden and singer-guitarist Lonnie Johnson together for two Prestige albums, assembled a quartet that included Cliff Jackson for a Riverside session, Harlem Banjo, and, in 1961, a sextet session with Roy Eldridge, Bud Freeman, Jo Jones, and Ray and Tommy Bryant—it was released on the Fontana and Black Lion labels.

In 1963, his career boosted, Snowden appeared at the Newport Jazz Festival. He then moved to California to teach at the University of California, Berkeley, and played with Turk Murphy as well as taking private students for lessons in guitar and banjo. He toured Europe in 1967 with the Newport Guitar Workshop.

In 1969, Snowden moved back to Philadelphia, where he died on May 14, 1973.

== Discography ==
- Harlem Banjo (Riverside, 1960) with Cliff Jackson, Tommy Bryant, Jimmy Crawford
