= Danse Macabre (disambiguation) =

Danse Macabre is a late-medieval allegory of the universality of death.

Danse Macabre or Dance Macabre may also refer to:

== Film and television ==
- Danse Macabre (1922 film), an American short film directed by Dudley Murphy
- Danse Macabre (1958 film), a Hungarian drama film
- Dance Macabre (film), a 1992 American horror film
- Danse Macabre (2009 film), a Canadian short drama film
- "Danse Macabre" (Grimm), a television episode
- "Danse Macabre" (Jonathan Creek), a television episode

== Literature and art ==
- Danse Macabre (King book), a 1981 nonfiction book by Stephen King
- Danse Macabre (novel), a 2006 novel by Laurell K. Hamilton
- Danse Macabre (Notke), a 15th-century painting by Bernt Notke

== Music ==
- Danse macabre (Saint-Saëns), a tone poem for orchestra composed by Camille Saint-Saëns
- Cortège & Danse Macabre, a symphonic poem from Frederik Magle's Cantabile suite
- Danse Macabre Records, a German record label
- Danse Macabre (Duran Duran album), 2023
- Danse Macabre (The Faint album), 2001
- "Dance Macabre" (song), by Ghost, 2018
- "Danse Macabre", a song by The Agonist from Eye of Providence
- "Danse Macabre", a song by Celtic Frost from Morbid Tales
- "Danse Macabre", a song by Dead End
- "Dance Macabre", a song by Decapitated from Winds of Creation

== Other uses ==
- Danse Macabre (Efteling), a haunted attraction in Kaatsheuvel, the Netherlands

== See also ==
- Danza macabra or Castle of Blood, a 1964 horror film
- La Grande Danse Macabre, a 2001 album by Marduk
- Dansen Macabre, a Marvel Comics character
- Dance of Death (disambiguation)
- Dance of the Dead (disambiguation)
- Totentanz (disambiguation)
