= Haunted Castle (Efteling) =

Haunted attraction

Coordinates: 51°38′56″N 5°02′55″E

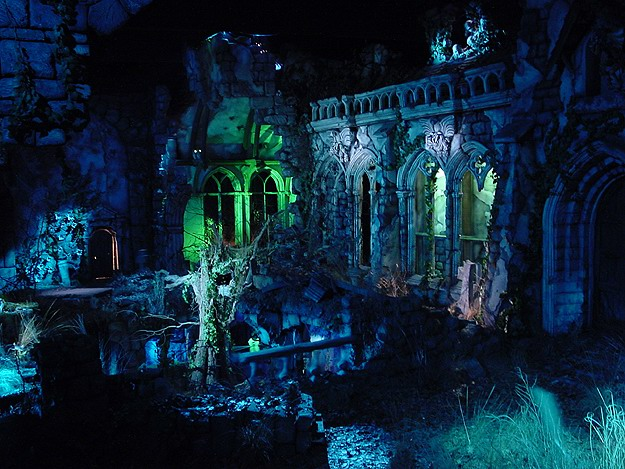
Main show

Back of the castle

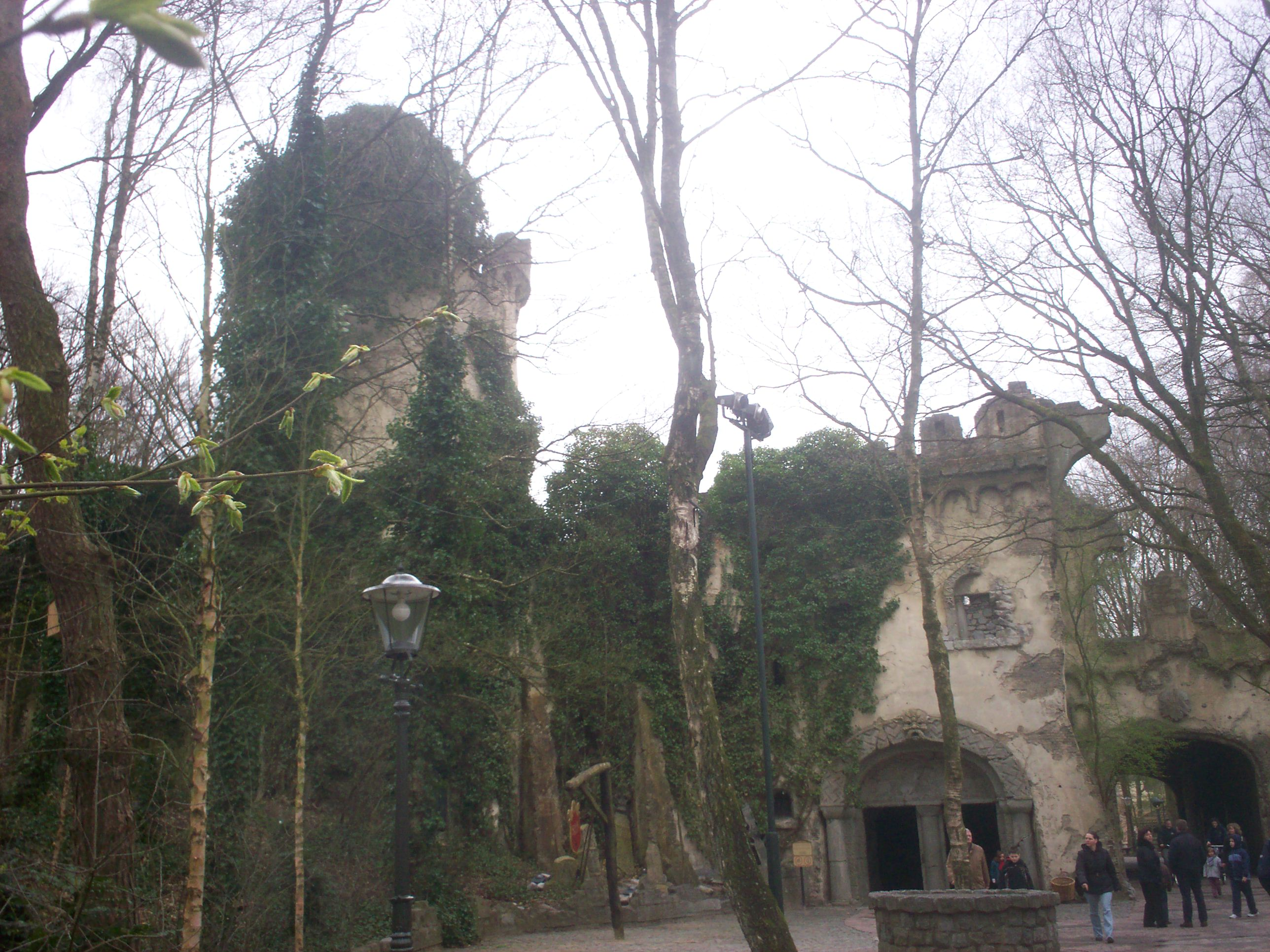
The originally very sinister front of the castle, later virtually invisible because of the ivy

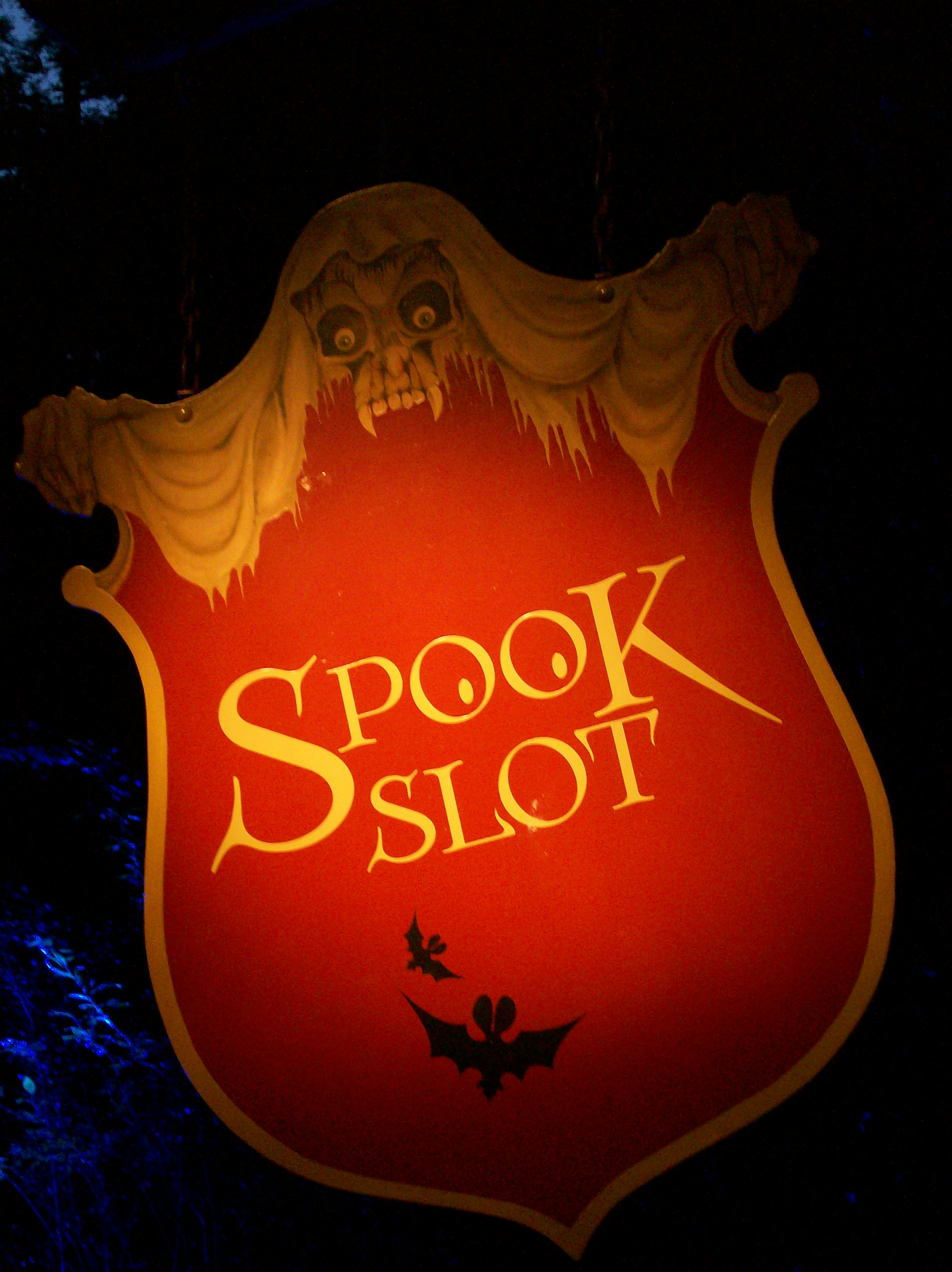
Spookslot square by night

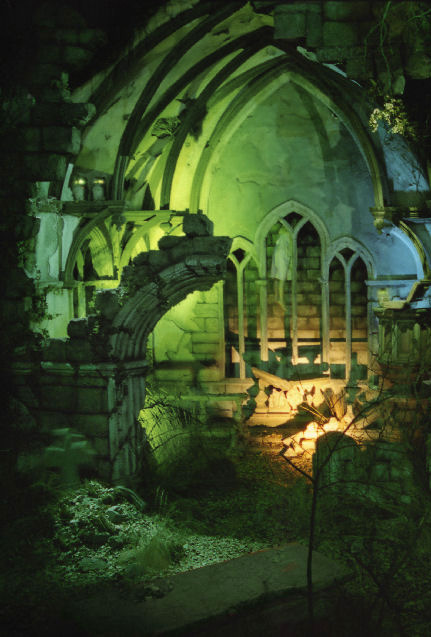
Detail from the inside of the castle

The Haunted Castle or known as Spookslot was a haunted attraction in the amusement park Efteling in the Netherlands. It was designed by Ton van de Ven and was the first attraction built outside the Fairy Tale Forest.

== History ==
On July 24, 1976, an announcement on the making of the world's biggest haunted castle appeared in Brabant's daily newspaper: Het Brabants Dagblad. The article mentioned that the castle would be built between the Fairy Tale Forest and the rowing and canoeing pond. This was a strategic choice because the location of the attraction would attract visitors to the normally ‘forgotten’ southern part of the park.

The main reason for this mega-attraction was the declining numbers of visitors at Efteling. Aiming to increase attendance with an indoor attraction that did not depend on weather conditions, Efteling authorized its young designer Van de Ven to start designing the ride.

Van de Ven designed the castle as a walk-through attraction. Following the style of Anton Pieck, Van de Ven designed the castle to appear old and decayed, yet somewhat romantic and haunting. Efteling chose Danse macabre by Camille Saint-Seans as the soundtrack and unifying theme for the ride.

Construction took about 18 months and the castle was officially opened May 10, 1978. On May 12, 1978, a television special was broadcast with Kate Bush singing in and around the castle.

On January 24, 2022, Efteling announced the attraction would permanently close on September 4 of that year. It was replaced by a new ride in the same theme, inspired by the same music of the Danse macabre. The ride, named Danse Macabre, opened on October 31, 2024. Elements of the original attraction were repurposed in its successor and the new surrounding Huyverwoud area.

== Ride statistics ==
- Ride time: 6:27 minutes
- Capacity: 800 visitors per hour (estimated)
- Cost: €1,588,823 (40% overspent)

== Ride details ==
Looking closely at the exterior of the Spookslot, a number of faces could be seen in the ruins. The largest was above the main entrance: two windows were the eyes and the entrance itself was a gaping mouth, through which the visitors entered. When it rained, one window appeared to cry. Two of the tombstones outside the castle carried the logos of the National Railway Organisation and the Rabobank.

The waiting hall was a dimly-lit area, with several spooky items, of which an eastern ghost with a crystal bowl was the most notable. The glass used the pepper's ghost technique to show a beautiful woman turning into a skull. Another famous effect, added in 1979, were dogs lying behind a door, who started to rattle their chains when someone pulled the doorknob. In the tower area, a hairy arm stretched from the roof, holding a large chandelier. Occasionally, three horrible demonlike creatures (vlederikken) could be seen leering down at visitors.

The waiting hall provided the attraction's backstory. The castle once belonged to the fourth viscount of Capelle van Kaatsheuvel, who collected many of the stories found within Efteling. A wicked witch named Visculamia sought to steal the viscount's stories for herself, but was caught by a gardener and sentenced to death by three judges. She laid a curse onto those that wronged her, with the count being forced to search for his missing daughter Esmeralda for eternity.

Upon entering the main attraction hall, a number of scary statues and scenes prepared the audience for the main course: a look into the inner court, graveyard, and the ruins of a monastery at night. When the clock struck twelve, a violin (a uv lighted animatronic) started playing Danse Macabre and the witch's curse brought the graveyard to life. Several skeletons and ghosts appeared along with the gardener hanging from a noose and the three judges being reduced to howling undead creatures. One tombstone was labeled in Latin "Puella Innocenta" (innocent girl). The years on her stone (in Roman numerals) revealed that she had been living backwards in time. (However, it is possible that it was merely a mistake of the artist who made the stone.) There was also a tombstone inside the mansion with the name "Den Hegarty", an Irish rock singer who happened to be on the radio when the stone was made. Also, it is said that the main show's appearance was influenced by the 1971 horror film "Tombs of the Blind Dead".

== Music ==
The main theme of the show was a shortened version of the Danse macabre by Camille Saint-Saëns. The movements of the animatronics were synchronized with the music. The show itself has been adapted four times. During the opening season in 1978, the show lasted about 12 minutes. Three months later, it was shortened to 8 minutes. In 1987, the show was renewed and further updated in 1989.

Leading up to the Dance Macabre was a prelude that contained - as part of the soundscape - two pieces of music: (1) "Claws" composed by Marc Rosen in the 1980s for the Stock-music-library Omnimusic; and (2) "Terza Età", from the album "Città Notte" (1972), by Egisto Macchi. "Terza Età" was already used before in the first version of the show at its premiere in 1978.
