= Macabre (disambiguation) =

Macabre is a quality of some artistic or literary works characterized by a grim or ghastly atmosphere or a heavy emphasis on gruesome portrayals of death.

Macabre may also refer to:

Literature:

- Macabre (short fiction and poetry journal), edited and published by Connecticut poet/author, Joseph Payne Brennan, New Haven, CT, Twenty-three (23) issues, I - XXIII, 1957–1976

Films:

- Macabre (1958 film), a thriller directed by William Castle
- Macabre (1969 film), an Italian thriller directed by Javier Setó
- Macabre (1980 film), an Italian horror thriller directed by Lamberto Bava
- Macabre (2009 film), an Indonesian horror/slasher film

In music:

- Macabre, a 2023 album by Brymo
- Macabre (album), by Dir en grey
- Macabre (band), a metal band
- Pentagram (band), previously known as Macabre, an American heavy metal band

== See also ==
- Danse Macabre (disambiguation)
