= Triumph of Death =

Triumph of Death may refer to:

== Visual arts ==
- The Triumph of Death (canvas, 1562) by Pieter Bruegel the Elder at Museo del Prado
- Triumph of Death (Palermo), (detached fresco, 1446) by unknown artist at Palazzo Abatellis, Sicily, Italy
- Triumph of Death (former fresco, 14th century) attributed to Buonamico Buffalmacco at Camposanto of Pisa, Tuscany, Italy
- Triumph of Death (fresco, late 14th century) by Bartolo di Fredi at San Francesco, Lucignano, Tuscany, Italy

== Other uses ==
- The Triumph of Death (ballet) (1971), with choreography by Flemming Flindt and music by Thomas Koppel
- Triumph of Death (Hellhammer), a demo tape by extreme metal band Hellhammer
- Il trionfo della morte, a novel by Gabriele D'Annunzio

== See also ==
- Danse Macabre
- Dance of Death (disambiguation)
