= Danse Macabre (1922 film) =

1922 film by Dudley Murphy

- The Full film
- Directed by: Dudley Murphy
- Starring: Adolph Bolm; Ruth Page; Olin Howland
- Release date: 1922
- Running time: 554 feet/8.21 meters; 8 minutes
- Country: United States
- Language: English

Danse Macabre is a 1922 American short silent film directed by Dudley Murphy and conceived by ballet dancer Adolph Bolm, who also stars in the film. Set to Danse macabre, a symphonic poem for orchestra by French composer Camille Saint-Saëns, the film depicts Youth (Bolm) and Love (Ruth Page) attempting to evade the grasp of Death (Olin Howland) in Spain during the Black Plague. The film is one of a series of twelve "visual symphonies" set to classical music by Murphy, and was advertised as the first dance film to be synchronized with a sound score.

Danse Macabre was filmed entirely on a studio set, with Francis Bruguière providing the lighting. In addition to the central dance routine, the film features animation by commercial animation house F. A. A. Dahme, as well as superimposition effects.
