= Betty Felsen =

Ballerina, vaudeville star, teacher

Betty Felsen (1905–2000) was a ballet dancer, vaudeville star, and teacher. After graduating from the Pavley-Oukrainsky Ballet School in 1919, she joined the corps de ballet and became a ballerina soloist in December 1920. Felsen left the Chicago Opera in 1922 for a vaudeville career and with her new partner Jack Broderick, began touring the U.S. and Canada in their headline act, Broderick & Felsen. After Jack left the act near the end of 1927, Betty performed with her troupe as Betty Felsen & Company until November 1928. Betty then owned and operated a performing arts school, first in Worcester, Massachusetts, until 1932 and then in Cleveland, Ohio, until she retired in 1937.

== Ballet career ==
=== Early years ===
Betty was born on June 9, 1905, in Chicago, Illinois, to Jewish American parents Lillian and David Felsenthal. Her birth name was Bertha Felsenthal, which she never used professionally. She began practicing ballet at age seven where she took lessons from H.W. Miller. In programs and newspaper articles, Betty's first name appeared in different forms, namely Buddye, Buddy, and Buddie, while her last name was either Felsen of Felsenthal. She received praise from the New York Star, which for a time was known as The Vaudeville News and New York Star, for her performance at a meeting of the Western Vaudeville Managers Association in June 1915. The paper's Chicago representative, H.C. Danforth, wrote a letter on June 16, 1915, praising her abilities.

=== From corps de ballet to ballerina soloist ===
In 1916, shortly before her tenth birthday, her parents enrolled her at the Pavley-Oukrainsky Ballet School under the name Buddye Felsenthal. In 1919, the Chicago Opera Association accepted Betty, sometimes referred to as Elise, as a member of the corps de ballet because she passed the required tests. Betty was one of several Gypsies dancing while Carmen sings in Act 2 of the Chicago Opera's 1921 productions of Bizet's opera Carmen.

In 1919, Adolph Bolm was invited by the Chicago Opera to stage an original ballet. He developed a ballet of The Birthday of the Infanta with music by Chicago composer John Alden Carpenter and decor by the American costume designer Robert Edmond Jones. Two scenes were performed at Chicago's Auditorium Theater on January 14, 1922, followed by several performances at the Manhattan Opera House in New York City. In these two scenes, sixteen-year-old ballerina Betty "Elise" Felsen danced as the Infanta, Oukrainsky danced as the dwarf, and Pavley danced as a Gypsy leader, as described in the February 3 New York Globe review.

During the 1920–1921 and 1921–1922 opera seasons, Betty performed in the Dance of the Moorish Slaves in Verdi's Aida numerous times. She was one of six female slaves but appeared first performing a short solo dance, then danced with the ensemble of male and female slaves during which she performed several short solo dances. In late fall of 1922, Betty left the Chicago Opera and began performing solo at Fred Mann's Million Dollar Rainbo Room in the Rainbo Gardens. Under the name Buddye Felsen, Betty landed a dancing role and the singer Ruth Etting was hired as one of the lead singers. The show, Rainbo Trail opened on December 15, 1922, and ran until March 1, 1923.

=== Broderick and Felsen ===
In spring 1923, she and Frank Lischeron began to collab. Beginning in June, they were requested by Balaban and Sam Katz to appear for one week each at many of their theaters. However, at the end of the summer, she and Frank separated. Betty formed a partnership with dancer Jack Broderick at the beginning of the fall in 1923 and for the next few weeks they hired performers and crew and developed their act, Broderick & Felsen. Broderick and Felsen toured in the Midwest on the B.F. Keith Vaudeville Circuit during the last quarter of 1923 and into the second quarter of 1924. In January 1924, they hired Verne Rathaar for piano. Shortly before the summer of 1924, Broderick and Felsen contracted with the Pantages Vaudeville Circuit and performed across the American mid-west and the western United States and Canada through December.

In late 1925, they appeared on the Orpheum Vaudeville Circuit and at two independent vaudeville theater chains. Throughout their tours, Broderick & Felsen presented their program of original dance creations, which involved different styles of dance that included classical ballet, tap, Spanish—including their Argentine tango dance— and modern (aka interpretive). One of Betty's most well-known ballet creations was titled "The Butterfly Who Lived but a Day". In one of acts where Betty runs and leaps in a dive past Broderick and he catches her by the ankles and swings her around, Betty was injured with a torn ligament in her leg. In January 1925, Betty and Broderick ended their contract with the Pantages circuit and returned to the B.F. Keith circuit. They replaced Verne Rathaar with the Jud Hill Orchestra. Also in January, Betty convinced tap dancer Pincus Leff, aka Pinky Lee, to join their company; he soon became a featured dancer. The orchestra and Pincus Leff remained with the act throughout 1925.

A debut occurred on September 20, 1925, at the B.S. Moss Colony Theater on Broadway at 53rd Street in New York City with their production called Campus Capers. This was a prologue Betty and Broderick created for the new Harold Lloyd film, The Freshman. They also created a new prologue act for the film The Phantom of the Opera that would be shown beginning on November 28, 1925, after the ten-week engagement of The Freshman ended. Their act continued for 19 or 20 weeks, finishing on January 30 or February 6, 1926.

After Colony Theater, they joined a new production by actor-comedian Emil Boreo called Mirage de Paris. Betty and Broderick was in the starring roles. Impresario Merriel Abbott, their friend and former teaching assistant for the Pavley-Ourainsky Ballet, sent a telegram congratulating them on their opening. After their opening week at the Palace, the production played for a week in St. Louis and another week back in Chicago.

Following a rest, Broderick and Felsen created their own production titled Ballet Caprice in which they presented routines in their dance styles with costumes and sets. They contracted with impresario George Choos to produce it and manage the tour. The show opened on September 30, 1926, in New York City at B.F. Keith's Riverside Theater on Broadway, playing for four weeks. Broderick & Felsen then continued their Ballet Caprice tour of Keith-Albee circuit theaters in other cities before returning to New York City to present the show at the Hippodrome Theater for the week of January 3, 1927. After that week, their tour continued for most of the year in the mid-west and northeast.

From January 1927 into June 1928, a shadowgraph production appeared at many of the theaters on the same bill at which Ballet Caprice played. Members of the Ballet Caprice troupe were often among those who performed behind the curtain for the production. Toward the end of 1927, Broderick left the act and ended the partnership. Betty created a production called Visions of Dance for her new dance company known as Betty Felsen & Company.

== Performing arts schools ==
Betty owned and operated performing arts schools from October 1928 through early 1937, first in Worcester, Massachusetts and then in Cleveland, Ohio.

Betty opened her first school in Worcester on November 1, 1928, in partnership with vaudeville dancer Danny Duggan. It was called the Danny Duggan-Betty Felsen School of The Dance, aka "School of Dancing". The classes included ballet, tap, jazz, and modern dance. Betty's school was variously known as the:

- Danny Duggan & Betty Felsen School of The Dance and School of Dancing, 1928
- Betty Felsen-Danny Duggan Studio of the Dance, 1929
- Betty Felsen Studio of the Dance, 1930
- Betty Felsen School of Stage Dancing

During the week of November 18 Betty performed her cymbal dance at Worcester's Capitol Theater. This was followed by command performances at Worcester's Plymouth Theater, and again at the Capitol. The June 12 program at Mechanics Hall is typical of the programs that included Betty. During the early-to-mid 1930s, Betty continued her school now known as the Betty Felsen Studio of the Dance or the Betty Felsen School of Stage Dancing and present The Betty Felsen Revue at vaudeville theaters on the Radio-Keith-Orpheum Circuit throughout New England. In 1930, the revue toured from June 4, when they left Worcester, until September 14 when they returned home.

=== Cleveland, Ohio ===
Betty moved to Cleveland and opened the Betty Felsen School of the Dance sometime in mid-1932. Her school was first located at 510 Carnegie Hall but in late 1934 was moved to 1706 Euclid Avenue in Playhouse Square. From then until she retired in mid-1937, she operated her school under several different names. In early 1936, Betty had a short partnership with David Berke with whom she still sometimes performed. Her schools were variously known as:

- Betty Felsen School of the Dance
- Betty Felsen Studios
- Felsen & Berke Studios of Stage and Radio Arts
- Betty Felsen Studios of Stage and Radio Arts

On June 21, 1936, Betty presented her annual program, The Betty Felsen Revue, at Cleveland's Masonic Auditorium. This program included sixty-five students she selected from the students at the Betty Felsen Studios. Betty served as a judge of the singing and dancing performances. She extended professional courtesy to visitors.
