= Richard Wells (dancer) =

American tap dancer

- Born: 1908
- Died: 1949 (aged 40–41)
- Occupation: Tap dancer

Richard "Dickie" Wells (1908–1949), also sometimes known as Mr. Harlem, was an American tap dancer and nightclub owner. Wells first gained note dancing in the Wells, Mordecai and Taylor Dance Trio with Jimmy Mordecai and Ernest Taylor. This group performed at New York City nightclubs such as the Cotton Club. Wells soon became a nightclub owner.

== Relationships with women ==
Wells was thought to have had relationships with many well-known women including Nina Mae McKinney, Joan Crawford, Tallulah Bankhead, Ava Gardner, Lana Turner, Margherite Chapman, and Jean Parks. Wells introduced Joe Louis to a number of women.

== Club ownership ==
Wells owned and managed "Dickie's Club," in Harlem, which was known for its food. Wells is rumored to have been the inventor of chicken and waffles. His club is one of the earliest known restaurants to serve the dish.

The club attracted famous patrons, among them Tallulah Bankhead, Errol Flynn, Ava Gardner, Clark Gable, Bumpy Johnson, Charlie Chaplin, Joan Crawford, and Walter Winchell. Singer Billy Daniels was among the notable performers at his club.

== Death ==
At the age of 41, Wells died of causes related to alcohol and cocaine use in the apartment of singer Jean Parks. Wells is buried at Woodlawn Cemetery in the Bronx, NY.

== Trials ==
After his death, Wells was named in a trial concerning Tallulah Bankhead. It was believed he supplied Bankhead with cocaine. Wells was also involved in a trial involving the daughter of a US diplomat who had become a call girl.
