= Jan Erkert =

Jan Erkert is a choreographer, teacher, author and Professor Emerita Dance at the University of Illinois, Urbana-Champaign.

== Dance company ==
As Artistic Director of Jan Erkert & Dancers from 1979 to 2000, she created over 70 modern dances. Ms. Erkert's work has been seen throughout the United States as well as in Germany, Mexico, Taiwan, Japan, Uruguay and Israel. Ms. Erkert and the company have been honored with numerous awards including fellowships from the National Endowment for the Arts and the Illinois Arts Council, and Ruth Page Awards for choreography and performance. She has received two Fulbright Scholar Awards and is currently serving on the Fulbright panel. In Erkert's own description of her work, she calls herself a 'dancemaker.'

== Dance writing ==
Throughout her career she has devoted much of her energy to advancing teaching and learning. She authored Harnessing the Wind: The Art of Teaching Modern Dance, which was published in 2003 by Human Kinetics.

== Master teacher ==
Erkert has been a master teacher at universities and colleges throughout the United States, Mexico, Europe and Asia.

Her teaching philosophy combines the concepts of yield/push and reach/pull to differentiate qualities of effort and the focus of energy. Yielding to gravity—not flopping, but finding the yield and push-"dance students begin to discover that yielding isn't always about the places in your body you're thinking about. I'm asking them to wake up their nerve cells and touch sensations." Erkert has been a strong spokesperson for innovative and interdisciplinary education, speaking at numerous national and international conferences including the Academic Chairperson Conference, The National Association for Schools of Dance(NASD), and the International Conference, Performing Arts Training Today.

== University teaching ==
As a professor of dance at Columbia College Chicago from 1990 to 2006, she garnered many awards including the 1999 Excellence in Teaching Award, and was a nominee for the U.S. Professor of the Year sponsored by the Carnegie Foundation.

After a long history of guest teaching at the University of Illinois at Urbana/Champaign, Erkert became department head of the Department of Dance in 2008 where she teaches today as a Professor of Dance. She has spearheaded numerous collaborative projects including the construction of a floating, sustainable dance studio in collaboration with student and faculty architects and environmentalists.

== Choreography and other media ==
Her political and community work includes partnerships with the Kovler Center for Survivors of Torture, The Peace Museum and Amnesty International. She recently traveled around the world to study perceptions of the body and gender as experienced in communal bathing. She is currently writing a screenplay for television about these experiences. Laura Molzhan, in The Chicago Reader, writes that "Jan Erkert is the best kind of magician, conjuring up feeling without ever grabbing for heartstrings or resorting to throbbing violins. Instead the dry, hard, everyday facts of the dance accumulate until they're like a mound of stones on the heart--and we're forced to notice our own sorrow. Then, just as magically, noticing takes the sorrow away and leaves the heart free and open."
