= Paul Christiano (choreographer) =

American choreographer

- Born: Paul Philip Christiano; February 4, 1976; Bartlett, Illinois, US
- Died: c. August 1, 2015 (aged 39); Forest Park, Illinois, US
- Occupations: Choreographer, dancer

Paul Philip Christiano (February 4, 1976 – c. August 1, 2015) was an American choreographer and dancer, known for his work and career in Chicago, Illinois.

== Career ==
Christiano started out as a gymnast. By age twelve, he moved into dance. After high school, he spent three years on a scholarship with the Lou Conte Dance Studio. He joined Hubbard Street II in 1998, Thodos Dance Chicago in 1999, and Lyric Opera of Chicago in 2008. He worked for Joffrey Ballet. As a contemporary concert dancer, he was lauded for his "wondrous skills" and "striking acrobatic skill".

In 2001, he received a Ruth Page Award for his first choreographic effort, Miracle, Interrupted. His choreographed works have since been featured in the repertories of Thodos Dance Chicago, Joffrey Ballet, and River North Dance Chicago, among other dance companies.

== Personal life ==
Christiano grew up in the western suburb of Bartlett. In 1999, he stepped into a federal sting operation when he ordered child pornography. He avoided prison but was permanently added to the Illinois sex offender registry, and received five years of state-ordered therapy. The presence of Christiano's name on the registry frequently interrupted his career. He became "an outcast", made several suicide attempts, and volunteered for US-based pedophilia advocacy group "B4U-ACT". He poisoned and killed himself at the age of 39:

"Paul Christiano, who would kill himself six months later after an incident around misreporting his address to the police. [...] There was an inconsistency in the records he gave, and rather than face almost certain prison time, he decided to take his own life."

== Selected choreographed works ==
- Miracle, Interrupted (2001)
- First Love; Second Sight (2003)
- Tyranny of the Geek (2006)
- Virgo (2007)
- Two Sides to Every Studio Apartment (2008)
- ADHDivas (2010)
- Immediate Gratification (2011)
- 101 Cures for Boredom (2011)

== Awards ==
- 2001: Ruth Page Award, for Miracle, Interrupted
- 2001: One of Chicago Tribune's "Chicagoans of the Year"
- 2002: Illinois Arts Council Artist Fellowship Award
- 2003: COTY (Choreographer of the Year) Award, from Dance Chicago
- 2003: Chicago Magazine "Dancer of the year"
- 2010: One of Time Out's "Dancing Men of 2010"

== See also ==
- List of dancers
