= Chamber ballet =

A chamber ballet is a chamber music performance or work that features one or more ballet dancers. Examples are a chamber music composition with the addition of dancers, or a full-scale ballet performed using a smaller ensemble.

This form developed in the early 20th century, with a pas de Deux being used by Adolf Bolm.

Den Collinske Gård in Copenhagen was a venue revitalizing chamber ballet performances in 2010–11.
