= Dance of the Dead =

Dance of the Dead may refer to:

- Danse Macabre, a late-medieval allegory on the universality of death
- Dance of the Dead (film), a 2008 American horror film
- Dance of the Dead (novel), a Dungeons & Dragons tie-in novel
- "Dance of the Dead" (Masters of Horror), an episode of the TV series Masters of Horror
  - "Dance of the Dead", a 1954 short story by Richard Matheson; basis for the TV episode
- "Dance of the Dead" (The Prisoner), an episode of the TV series The Prisoner
- The Dance of the Dead, a Bernice Summerfield audio drama, based on the TV series Doctor Who

== See also ==
- Bon Odori, a Japanese traditional dance welcoming the spirits of the dead
- La danse des morts, an oratorio by Arthur Honegger
- Dance Hall of the Dead, a novel by Tony Hillerman
- Dance of the Undead (Scooby-Doo! Mystery Incorporated), a Scooby-Doo! Mystery Incorporated episode
- Dance of Death (disambiguation)
- Danse Macabre (disambiguation)
- Totentanz (disambiguation)
