= Peaches and cream =

Dish of cream and peaches

- Peaches and cream served with chicken and waffles, another Southern dish
- Type: Dessert
- Place of origin: United States
- Main ingredients: Peaches, cream

Peaches and cream is made by pouring a little cream over sliced peaches. It can also be made adding a spoonful of whipped cream on top of the sliced peaches. It is usually served as a dessert, but can also be served for breakfast. It is popular in the United States (especially in the South) and in other countries. It is traditionally served in the summer when peaches are in season.

It is sometimes served at ice cream stands and float shops. Some types of hard candy, such as Creme Savers, also offer a peaches and cream flavor.

== See also ==
- List of desserts
