= Dudley Murphy =

American film director (1897–1968)

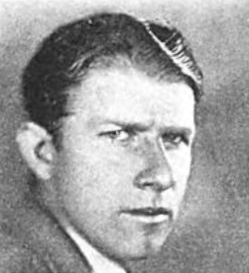
- Born: July 10, 1897; Winchester, Massachusetts, US
- Died: February 22, 1968 (aged 70); Mexico City, Mexico
- Occupations: Film director; writer; actor

Dudley Bowles Murphy (July 10, 1897 – February 22, 1968) was an American film director.

== Early life ==
Murphy was born on July 10, 1897, in Winchester, Massachusetts, to the artists Caroline Hutchinson (Bowles) Murphy (1868–1923) and Hermann Dudley Murphy (1867–1945), both accomplished Modernist landscape painters. After first finding work as a journalist, Dudley Murphy began making films in the early 1920s.

The Soul of the Cypress, 1921, full film

== Career ==
In his first short film, Soul of the Cypress (1921), a variation on the Orpheus myth, the film's protagonist falls in love with a dryad (a wood nymph whose soul dwells in an ancient tree) and throws himself into the sea to become immortal and spend eternity with her. Murphy's then-wife Chase Harringdine played the dryad. Murphy followed this with Danse Macabre (1922) featuring Adolph Bolm, Olin Howland, and Ruth Page. Both of these early films are in the DVD collection Unseen Cinema issued in October 2005.

Murphy's eighth film, Ballet mécanique, which he co-directed with the French artist Fernand Léger, premiered on 24 September 1924 at the Internationale Ausstellung neuer Theatertechnik (International Exposition for New Theater Technique) in Vienna. Considered one of the masterpieces of early experimental filmmaking, Ballet mécanique also included creative input from Man Ray and Ezra Pound, and was presented at the exposition by Frederick Kiesler. The film was scheduled to be screened with George Antheil's masterpiece of the same name. However, the music ran close to 30 minutes while the film was 17 minutes long. In 2000, Paul Lehrman produced a married print of the film.

In her book Dudley Murphy: Hollywood Wild Card, film historian Susan Delson argues persuasively that Murphy was the film's driving force but that Léger was more successful at promoting the film as his own creation. Ballet mécanique, with the George Antheil music originally written for the film, was included in the DVD collection Unseen Cinema released in October 2005.

In addition to Ballet mécanique, Murphy is best remembered for St. Louis Blues (1929) with Bessie Smith and Jimmy Mordecai, Black and Tan (1929) with Duke Ellington and His Orchestra, Confessions of a Co-Ed (1931), The Sport Parade (1932) with Joel McCrea, and The Emperor Jones (1933), starring Paul Robeson.

In 1932, Murphy helped introduce the Mexican artist David Alfaro Siqueiros to prominent people in the Los Angeles community. To show his gratitude, Siqueiros painted a mural on a wall in Murphy's Pacific Palisades home. The only intact mural by Siqueiros in the United States, Portrait of Mexico Today was donated anonymously to the Santa Barbara Museum of Art in 1999.

From the late 1940s through the 1960s Murphy and his fourth wife, Virginia, owned and operated Holiday House, an exclusive Malibu hotel designed by Richard Neutra and favored by the Hollywood elite.

== Selected filmography ==
Features

- High Speed Lee (1923)
- Alex the Great (1928)
- Stocks and Blondes (1928)
- What a Widow! (1930) (uncredited)
- Confessions of a Co-Ed (1931) (co-directed with David Burton)
- The Sport Parade (1932)
- The Emperor Jones (1933)
- The Night Is Young (1935)
- Don't Gamble with Love (1936)
- ...One Third of a Nation... (1939)
- Main Street Lawyer (1939)
- Toast of Love (1943)
- Alma de bronce (1944)

Shorts

- The Soul of the Cypress (1921)
- Danse Macabre (1922)
- Ballet mécanique (1924) (credited in the 1924 release, uncredited in later release)
- The Burglar (1929)
- St. Louis Blues (1929)
- Black and Tan (1929)
- He Was Her Man (1931)
- Lesson in Golf (1932)
- Abercrombie Had a Zombie (1941)
- Alabamy Bound (1941)
- Yes, Indeed! (1941)
- Merry-Go-Roundup (1941)
- Lazybones (1941)
- Easy Street (1941)
- I Don't Want to Set the World on Fire (1941)

== Bibliography ==
- James Donald, "Jazz Modernism and Film Art: Dudley Murphy and Ballet mécanique in Modernism/modernity 16:1 (January 2009), pages 25–49
- Delson, Susan (2006). Dudley Murphy, Hollywood Wild Card. Minneapolis: University of Minnesota Press. ISBN 978-0-8166-9769-4.
