= Chick'nCone =

Fast-food chain based in Pennsylvania

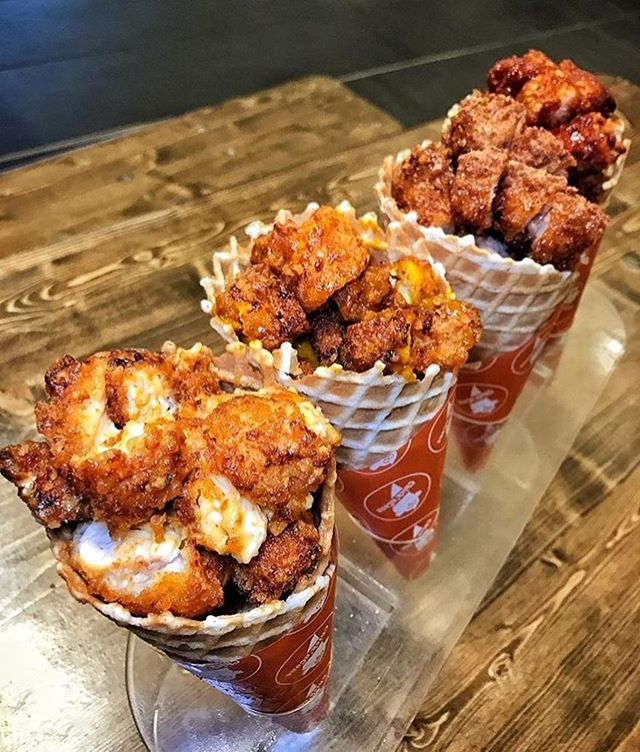

Restaurant information
- Owners: Jonathan Almanzar and Josh Lanier
- Food type: Fried chicken
- Location: Bangor, Pennsylvania, U.S.
- Website: chickncones.com

Chick'nCone is a Lehigh Valley, Pennsylvania-based fast food chain, founded and owned by Jonathan Almanzar and Josh Lanier, specializing in a portable version of chicken and waffles.

== Products ==
The namesake food consists of breaded chicken strips served in a waffle cone. One of the main features that distinguishes it from traditional chicken and waffles is that it served without utensils such as forks or knives.

== History ==
Before establishing permanent retail locations in the Lehigh Valley, New York City, and in Kentucky, Chick'nCone was primarily a food truck and catering service. Sometimes considered a hybrid food item following their transition to permanent locations, Chick'nCones have been referred to as "hipster" food, "frankenfood", and "fork-free chicken and waffles" by various media outlets. In 2016, one of the founders declared, "We wanna have 50 stores in 5 years. That's our goal."

=== Present locations ===
As of 2024, the company reports operating locations in the U.S. and globally:

==== Canada ====
- Toronto, Ontario

==== United Arab Emirates ====
- Al Kawaneej, Dubai, UAE
- Deira, Dubai, UAE
- Global Village, Dubai, UAE
- Sharjah, UAE

==== United States ====
- San Diego, California
- Fort Collins, Colorado
- Coral Gables, Florida
- Estero, Florida
- Fort Lauderdale, Florida
- Miami, Florida
- Orlando, Florida
- Winter Park, Florida
- Atlanta, Georgia
- Cumming, Georgia
- Emory Point, Georgia
- Macon, Georgia
- Leesville, Louisiana
- St. Louis, Missouri
- Jersey City, New Jersey
- New York City, New York
- Westerville, Ohio
- Hamilton, Ohio
- Jenks, Oklahoma
- Philadelphia, Pennsylvania
- Clarksville, Tennessee
- Dallas, Texas
- Houston Heights, Texas
- Mansfield, Texas
- San Antonio, Texas
- Sugar Land, Texas
- Casper, Wyoming

== See also ==
- List of chicken restaurants
