= Jimmy Mordecai =

American jazz tap dancer

Jimmy Mordecai (July 11, 1905 – May 7, 1966) also known as James Mordecai was an American, Harlem-based jazz tap dancer in the 1920s and 1930s. He featured in the 1929 short film St. Louis Blues, and starred in the 1930 Vitaphone Varieties musical short film, Yarmekraw, based on James P. Johnson's song of the same name.

== Career ==
Mordecai was born in New York City on July 11, 1905. His father was Samuel Mordecai and his mother Edith Wilhelm. His parents immigrated to the United States from British West Indies in 1901 through Cuba. He was in the cast of a 1924 touring show called Cotton Land, with music by James P. Johnson.

He was a member of a popular dance trio, Wells, Mordecai and Taylor – Dickie Wells (né Richard Wells; 1907–1949) and Ernest Taylor (died 1934) – the trio also was known as the Hot Feet Boys and the Three Klassy Kids, with whom he performed at the Cotton Club in 1930 with a Duke Ellington revue called Brown Sugar (Sweet But Unrefined). In that revue, he danced with Cora LaRedd, a renowned tap dancer active at the time.

In 1929, Mordecai began a brief film career, featured opposite Bessie Smith in Dudley Murphy's short, St. Louis Blues. Basically a vehicle for Smith (her only known film appearance) and for the music of W.C. Handy and the bandleader James P. Johnson, the film featured Mordecai as "Jimmy the Pimp", Smith's two-timing lover. Mordecai also played the lead role in Murray Roth's 1930 film Yamekraw, and a minor role in Dudley Murphy's 1933 The Emperor Jones, which starred Paul Robeson.

By 1936, Mordecai was the host and master of ceremonies at The Theatrical Grill, a Harlem nightclub on West 134th Street managed by Dickie Wells (Mordecai's former dancing partner, and a notorious Harlem gigolo — not to be confused with jazz trombonist, Dicky Wells).

A Jimmie Mordecai was cited, along with one Arizona Coffman, in a February 15, 1943, conviction in the City Magistrates Court of the City of New York, for selling liquor without a license from the basement of a Harlem establishment called the Frog Club, but it is unclear that this is the same Jimmy Mordecai.

Mordecai died in New York City on May 7, 1966, from a heart attack. He left a wife, Lucille Graves, and four children. Richard (Junie), Lionel (snookie), Joyce and Paul.

== Filmography ==
- St. Louis Blues (1929)
- Yamekraw (1930)
