= Totentanz (disambiguation) =

Totentanz, or Danse Macabre, is a genre of allegory from the Late Middle Ages on the universality of death.

Totentanz may also refer to:

- Totentanz (Adès), a 2013 composition for voice and orchestra by Thomas Adès
- Totentanz (Distler), a 1934 composition of 14 motets by Hugo Distler
- Totentanz (Liszt), an 1849 composition for piano and orchestra by Franz Liszt

== See also ==
- Dance of Death (disambiguation)
- Dance of the Dead (disambiguation)
- Danse Macabre (disambiguation)
