= St. Louis Blues (1929 film) =

1929 film

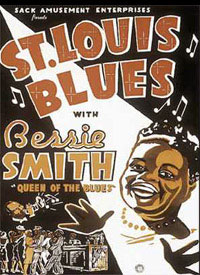
- Promotional release poster
- Directed by: Dudley Murphy
- Written by: Kenneth W. Adams and W. C. Handy
- Produced by: W. C. Handy
- Starring: Bessie Smith
- Cinematography: Walter Strenge
- Edited by: Russell G. Shields
- Distributed by: RKO Pictures
- Release date: November 5, 1929
- Running time: 16 minutes
- Country: United States
- Language: English

St. Louis Blues

St. Louis Blues is a 1929 American two-reel short film starring Bessie Smith. Directed by Dudley Murphy, it is the only known film featuring Bessie Smith, and the soundtrack is her only recording not controlled by Columbia Records. An early sound film, it features an entirely black cast, with Smith in the role of a woman left alone by her roving lover; in a speakeasy during the Prohibition era, the woman sings the W. C. Handy standard "St. Louis Blues".

Bessie Smith's recording of Handy's song was a hit in 1925, and Handy himself asked Bessie Smith to appear in the film. Handy co-authored the film and served as its musical director. The film is a dramatization of the song, concerning a woman left alone by her roving man. It features a band that includes James P. Johnson on piano, Thomas Morris and Joe Smith on cornet, Bernard Addison on guitar and banjo, as well as the Hall Johnson Choir.

St. Louis Blues was filmed in June 1929 in Astoria, Queens. The film was rumored for a long time to have been banned as demeaning and to have become lost. Neither rumor was true, but when a print was discovered in Mexico in the 1940s, the event was treated as a significant development, even though copies had, in fact, been available elsewhere.

In 2006, the film was selected for preservation in the United States National Film Registry by the Library of Congress as being "culturally, historically, or aesthetically significant".

== Plot ==
At a rooming house, a group of men are shooting dice; a janitor interrupts them, but one of the men bribes him into letting them continue. Jimmy the Pimp then arrives, flirting with a woman and joining and winning the dice game. Jimmy then brings the woman to the room he shares with his lover, Bessie. Bessie soon arrives and confronts the woman, who flees the room. Bessie then confronts and pleads with an unconcerned Jimmy, who pushes her to the ground and leaves.

A heartbroken Bessie finds herself in a speakeasy, where a chorus of other patrons accompany her in singing "St. Louis Blues". The other patrons begin to dance raucously while Bessie remains forlorn at the bar. Jimmy arrives at the speakeasy in good spirits, dancing before noticing Bessie at the bar. When they see each other, they embrace. The couple dance briefly before Jimmy takes money from Bessie's garter and leaves, prompting Bessie to return sadly to the bar counter, where she finishes singing the song.

== Production and Historical Context ==
St. Louis Blues, an early sound film or talkie was shot in June 1929 at the Astoria Studios in Queens, New York. W. C. Handy created the film expressly as a dramatic representation of his renowned 1914 piece. The production featured an impressive lineup of African American musical talent, including the Hall Johnson Choir and a band led by pianist James P. Johnson. The film's premiere happened during the Prohibition, and its speakeasy location mirrors the social realities of the time."

== Cast ==
- Bessie Smith as herself
- Hall Johnson Choir as Themselves
- James P. Johnson as Pianist (uncredited)
- Alec Lovejoy as Bit Role (uncredited)
- Jimmy Mordecai as Jimmy the Pimp, Smith's lover (uncredited)
- Thomas Morris as Cornetist (uncredited)
- Isabel Washington as the other woman (uncredited)
- Bernard Addison as Plectrist (uncredited)

== Preservation ==
St. Louis Blues was rumored to have been banned as demeaning and had become a lost film as a result. However, neither of these claims were true; still, when a print of the film was found in Mexico in the mid-1940s, the event was treated as a significant development, despite other copies of the film having been available elsewhere. According to Bessie Smith biographer Chris Albertson: "In 1950, a group of white liberals petitioned the NAACP to buy and destroy the print found in Mexico, which they believed to be the only copy extant." However, in 2022, film scholar Cinta Pelejà disputed this claim as a myth that possibly originated in the years following World War II.
