= Ruth Page (ballerina) =

American ballerina and choreographer (1899–1991)

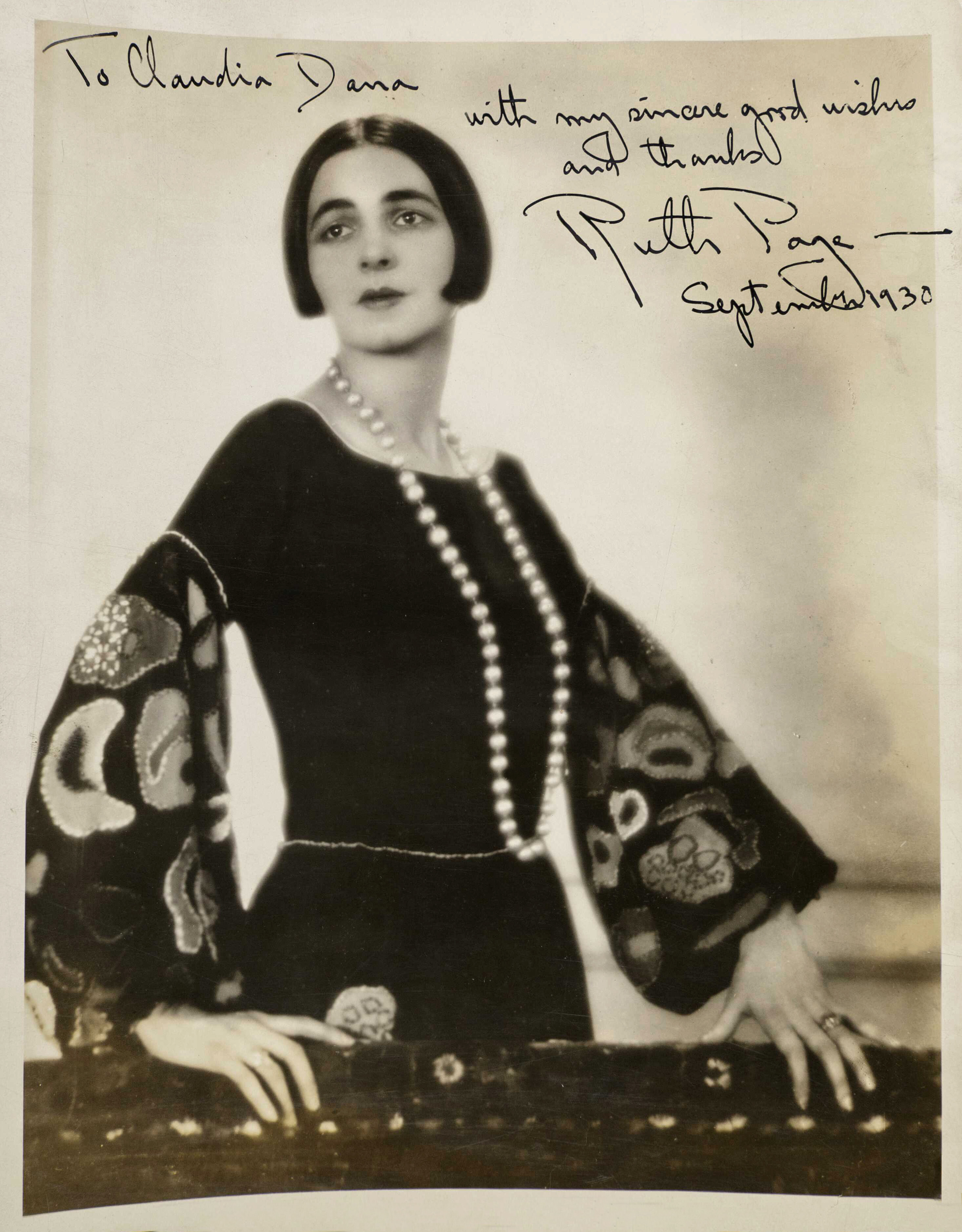
- Ruth Page in the 1920s (Newberry Library, Chicago)
- Born: March 22, 1899; Indianapolis, Indiana, U.S.
- Died: April 7, 1991 (aged 92); Chicago, Illinois, U.S.
- Occupations: Ballerina, choreographer

Ruth Page (March 22, 1899 – April 7, 1991) was an American ballerina and choreographer, who created innovative works on American themes.

== Life ==
=== Family ===
Page was married to attorney Thomas Hart Fisher from 1925 to 1969, and to artist Andre Delfau from 1983 until her death in 1991. She is buried in Graceland Cemetery in Chicago. Page's brother, Irvine H. Page, was a noted physician and scientist.

=== Career ===
Danse macabre: A "visual symphony" interpreting Camille Saint-Saëns' Danse macabre, performed by Adolf Bolm (Youth), Ruth Page (Love), and Olin Howland (Death)

Born in Indianapolis in 1899, Ruth Page undertook professional studies with Jan Zalewski, Adolph Bolm, Enrico Cecchetti, Harald Kreutzberg and Mary Wigman. She made her professional debut on Broadway in 1917, then with Anna Pavlova’s Company on its tour of South America in 1918, and at Chicago's Auditorium Theater in John Alden Carpenter’s The Birthday of the Infanta in 1919. She danced ceaselessly for the next forty years, with Adolph Bolm’s Ballet Intime, on Broadway in Irving Berlin’s Music Box Revue, with the Chicago Allied Arts, Sergei Diaghilev’s Ballets Russes, the Metropolitan, Ravinia, and Chicago Operas, the Ballet Russe de Monte Carlo, Les Ballets Americains, choreographed for all but one of those companies, choreographed the 1947 Broadway show Music in My Heart, and served as director/choreographer for the various manifestations of her own Chicago-based companies well into the 1970s. In 1937 she created An American Pattern (originally titled An American Woman) that is widely recognized as the first feminist ballet created in the United States. The period between 1943-1946 she experimented with "danced poems" that combined her interest in poetry and movement and resulted in a work she titled Dances with Words and Music. These innovative performances provided her a vehicle that gave voice to her subjectivity as a woman and to subvert the stereotypes that were pervasive in the male dominated world of ballet. Among hundreds of dance works to her credit are landmark Americana ballets, dances with words and music, and her innovative opera-into-ballets. Page's practice of turning operas into ballets was rooted in a synthetic conception of relationships between the arts: the body 'sang' the voice, although the translation from words to movement remained abstract and avoided a literal depiction of the text.

In 1965, she choreographed a large-scale production of The Nutcracker, which was presented annually through 1997 by the Chicago Tribune Charities in the Arie Crown Theatre and featured some of the world's great dancers as guest artists. She danced with great partners Bentley Stone, Walter Camryn, and Harald Kreutzberg, and worked with several of the greatest composers and designers of the 20th century, including Aaron Copland, Darius Milhaud, Jerome Moross, Isamu Noguchi, Antoni Clave, Georges Wakhevitch, Louis Horst, Marcel Delannoy, Pavel Tchelitchew, Nicholas Remisoff, and Andre Delfau. Rudolf Nureyev selected Page's Chicago Opera Ballet troupe for his New York City debut in 1962 with Sonia Arova. Her ballets have been revived and performed by ballet companies throughout the United States including Chicago, Milwaukee, Cincinnati, Pittsburgh, New York, and the Dance Theater of Harlem, as well as in Europe.

External videos
- You may watch Ruth Page's Chicago Opera Ballet performing the ballet Mephistophela for the CBS Repertoire Workshop to the music of La damnation de Faust by Hector Berlioz with Ruth Page as choreographer in 1964 here on chicagofilmarchives.org

Ruth filmed her ballets throughout her career and several, including Frankie & Johnny, The Merry Widow, and Billy Sunday were made into award-winning television films. As early as 1958, members of her Chicago Opera ballet troupe were also featured in performance on the Ed Sullivan Show. In the 1960s her choreographic artistry was frequently showcased on live network television for the CBS Repertoire Workshop. Her contributions included a televised adaptation for the ballet of Georges Bizet's opera Carmen. Her talents as a choreographer created numerous ballets set to the music of many operatic and classical composers including: Ludwig van Beethoven (Sonata Pathetique), Hector Berlioz (La Damnation de Faust), Georges Bizet (Carmen), Alexander Borodin (Prince Igor), Francesco Cilea (Adriana Lecouvreur), Gaetano Donizetti (La Favorite), Manuel de Falla (El Amor Brujo), George Gershwin (An American in Paris), Franz Lehar (The Merry Widow), Jules Massenet (Thais), Carl Orff (Carmina Burana), Amilcare Ponchielli (La Gioconda), Maurice Ravel (Boléro), Johann Strauss II (Die Fledermaus), Richard Strauss (Salome), Franz von Suppé (The Beautiful Galatea), Pyotr Ilyich Tchaikovsky (Romeo and Juliet, The Nutcracker), Ambroise Thomas (Mignon), and Giuseppe Verdi (Aida, La Forza del Destino, Il Trovatore, La Traviata). She is the subject of two award-winning documentaries: Ruth Page: An American Original (Otter Productions) and Ruth Page: Once Upon a Dancer (Thea Flaum Productions). The Ruth Page legacy lives on in several major archives including the Dance Division at Lincoln Center, the Ann Barzel Dance Collection at the Newberry Library and the Chicago Film Archives.

On retiring from active choreography, Page created the Ruth Page Foundation, which established the Ruth Page Foundation School of Dance, as it was originally known, and which later became the Ruth Page Center for the Arts, as it is known now.

She is interred at Graceland Cemetery in Chicago, about 5 feet from Cubs legend Ernie Banks.

== Ruth Page Center for the Arts ==
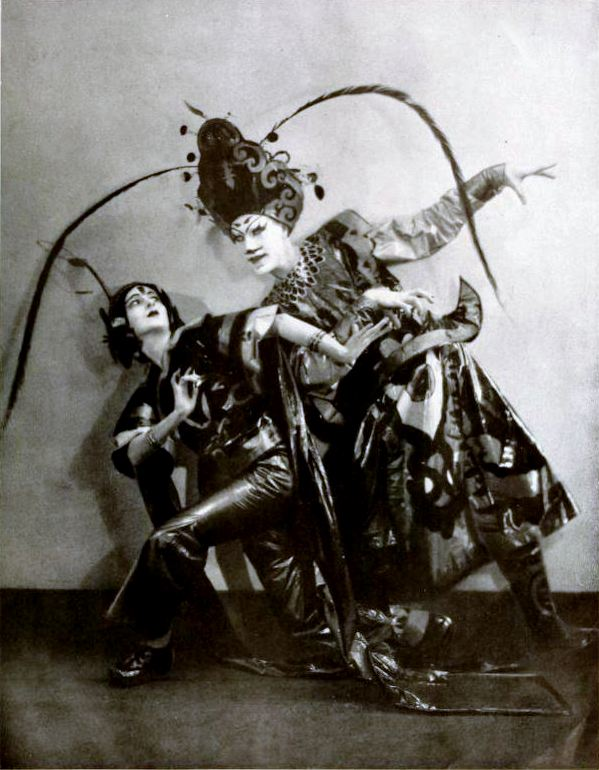
Dancing with Hubert Stowitts, from a 1923 magazine

=== Ruth Page Civic Ballet ===
The Ruth Page Civic Ballet is the official youth training performance company of the Ruth Page School of Dance and one of its Artists In-Residence. The company of talented young dancers is now in its 16th season and was founded in 1998 by Larry and Dolores Long, the original directors of the Ruth Page School of Dance.

Serving as a bridge between ballet training and professional performance, the Ruth Page Civic Ballet provides performance opportunities for advanced dance students from the School as a means of continuing their training. Members of the company will train in this program before moving on to national and international professional dance companies. The Civic's dancers are joined in performances by notable guest artists and choreographers, expanding their sphere of professional work.

The annual presentation of The Nutcracker has been a part of the Civic's performance schedule since 2003. The Ruth Page Civic Ballet production recreates Ruth Page's original full-length staging.

=== Ruth Page Award ===
The Ruth Page Award has been given by the Ruth Page Center for the Arts on behalf of the Ruth Page Foundation since 1986. The award acknowledges, or helps further, an individual's or organization's artistic momentum, and recognizes artistic excellence in the field of dance. The honoree is selected through the Selection Committee, composed of members from the Chicago dance community, former Ruth Page Award winners and Ruth Page Center for the Arts staff. Recipients:

- 2019: Jenai Cutcher
- 2014: Diane Rawlinson
- 2012: Sid Smith
- 2011: Patti Eylar
- 2010: Chicago Dancing Festival and its founders: Lar Lubovitch, Jay Franke, and David Herro
- 2009: Pamela Crutchfield and Bill T. Jones
- 2008: Peggy Sutton and the Mayfair Academy of Fine Arts
- 2007: Gail Kalver, Harriet Ross, and Salme H. Steinberg
- 2006: Billy Siegenfeld
- 2005: Margaret Nelson and Scott Silberstein
- 2004: Keith Elliott and Dance For Life
- 2003: Dame Libby Komaiko
- 2002: Cheryl Mann
- 2001: Davis Robertson for choreography
- 2001: Paul Christiano, for choreography of Miracle, Interrupted
- 1986: Carol Russell
- Claire Bataille
- Jan Erkert
- Winifred Haun
- XSight! Mary Ward, Brian Jeffery, Timothy O'Slynne
- Venetia Stifler
- Maia Wilkins
- 1986 Mary Ward
