= Chicken and waffles =

American dish

- Soul-food-style chicken and waffles, served with peaches and cream as dessert
- Place of origin: United States
- Region or state: Southern United States, Pennsylvania
- Serving temperature: Hot
- Main ingredients: Chicken, waffles
- Variations: Stewed chicken with gravy Fried chicken with butter and syrup

Chicken and waffles is an American dish combining chicken with waffles. It is part of a variety of culinary traditions, including Pennsylvania Dutch cuisine and soul food, and is served in certain specialty restaurants in the United States. Originating as a Pennsylvania Dutch meal, the dish is also popular in the Southern United States.

== Description ==
Chicken and waffles, as a combined recipe using pulled boiled chicken, first appeared in the United States' colonial period in the 1600s in Pennsylvania Dutch country. The traditional Pennsylvania Dutch version consists of a plain waffle with pulled, stewed chicken on top, covered in gravy.

A version using fried chicken is associated with the American South. The soul food version of chicken and waffles grew in popularity after the opening of the Wells Supper Club in Harlem, New York, in 1938. The waffle is served as it would be for breakfast, with condiments such as butter and syrup. This version of the dish is popular enough in Baltimore, Maryland to become a local custom.

== History ==
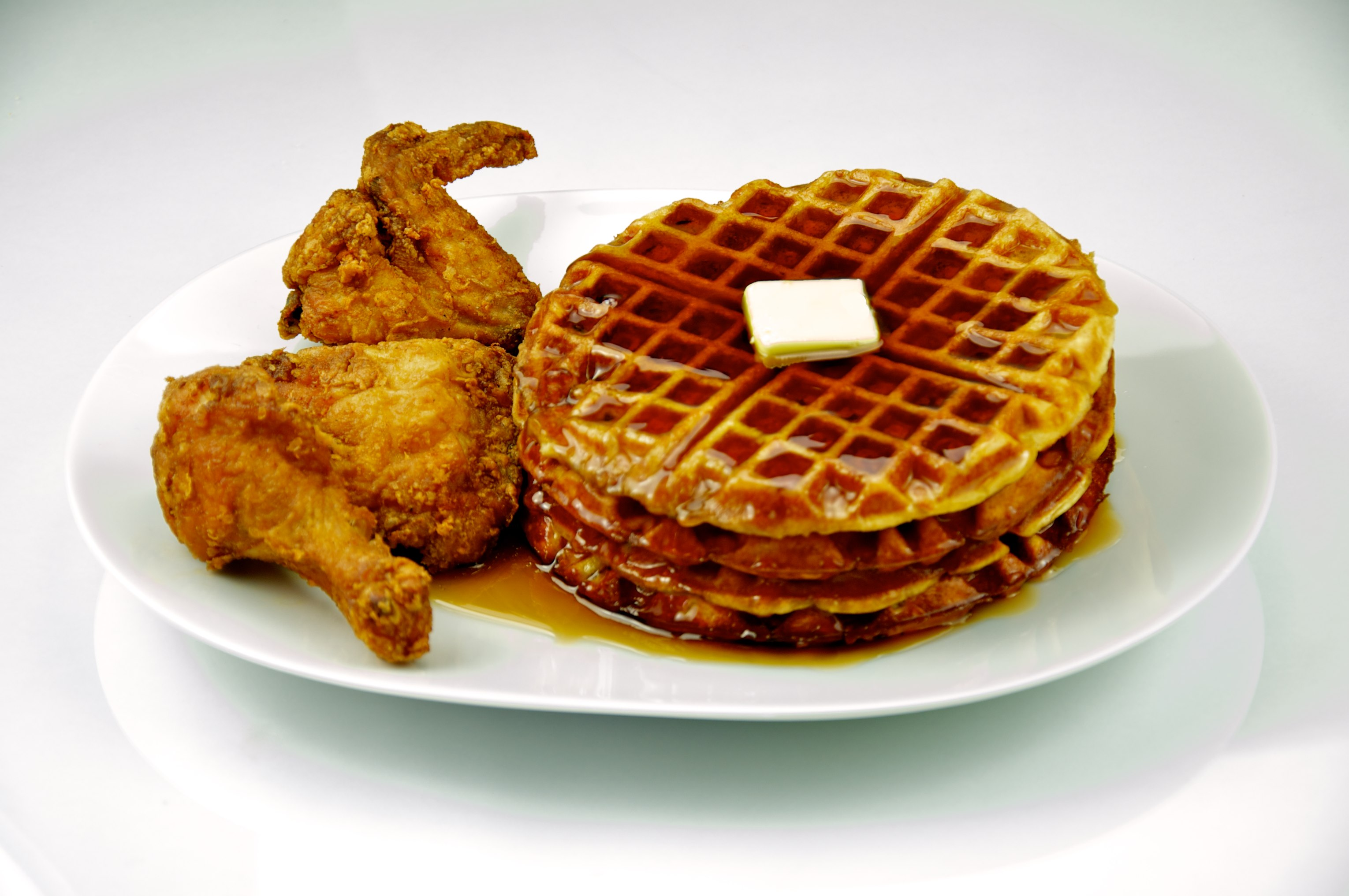
Fried chicken and waffles

The origins of the dish are unknown. Waffles entered American cuisine in the 1600s with European colonists. The food's popularity saw a notable boost after 1789 with Thomas Jefferson's purchase of four waffle irons in Amsterdam.

In the early 1800s, hotels and resorts outside Philadelphia served waffles with fried catfish. Such establishments also served other dishes such as fried chicken, which gradually became the meat of choice due to catfish's limited, seasonal availability. Waffles served with chicken and gravy were a common Sunday dish among the Pennsylvania Dutch by the 1860s. By the end of the 19th century, the dish was a symbol of Pennsylvania Dutch Country, brought on in part by its association with tourism. A 1901 memoir recalled a tavern in the Pittsburgh neighborhood East Liberty in western Pennsylvania that was known for "suppers of spring chickens and waffles".

By the 1840s, broiled chicken and waffles were the celebrated specialty at Warriner's Tavern in Springfield, Massachusetts, owned by "Uncle" Jeremy Warriner and his wife "Aunt" Phoebe, two well-known abolitionists. Prior to the Civil War, chicken and waffles were extravagant breakfast staples in plantation houses through much of the South, prepared by the well-trained cooks.

In 1909, a Griswold's waffle iron advertisement promised, "You can attend a chicken and waffle supper right at home any time you have the notion if you are the owner of a Griswold's American Waffle Iron."

A traditional story about the origin of the dish in soul food states that because African Americans in the South rarely had the opportunity to eat chicken and were more familiar with flapjacks or pancakes than with waffles, they considered the dish a delicacy. For decades, it remained "a special-occasion meal in African American families." The combination of chicken and waffles does not appear in early Southern cookbooks such as Mrs. Porter’s Southern Cookery Book, published in 1871, or in What Mrs. Fisher Knows About Old Southern Cooking, published in 1881 by former slave Abby Fisher. Fisher's cookbook is generally considered the first cookbook written by an African American. The lack of a recipe for the combination of chicken and waffles in Southern cookbooks from the era may suggest a later origin for the dish. Popular culture may have associated the dish with the South by 1917, when Edna Ferber's Fanny Herself mentioned a Chicago restaurant falsely advertising "Southern chicken dinner with waffles and real maple syrup, 35 cents each."

Fried chicken and waffles came to Los Angeles by 1931, when they were served at The Maryland, a restaurant that marketed the dish as a Southern specialty. James M. Cain's 1941 novel Mildred Pierce concerns a woman who finds success serving "chicken-and-waffle dinner" at her Glendale restaurant.

In New York City, the dish was served in the African-American community in Harlem as early as the 1930s in such locations as Tillie's Chicken Shack, Richard Wells' jazz nightclub, and particularly the Wells Supper Club. In 1935, the trumpeter Bunny Berigan composed a jazz instrumental titled "Chicken and Waffles".

Since the 1970s, chicken and waffles have gained popularity in Los Angeles due to the fame of former Harlem resident Herb Hudson's restaurant Roscoe's House of Chicken and Waffles, which has become known as a favorite of some Hollywood celebrities, referenced in several movies, and spun off several more into a small chain.

== See also ==
- Chick'nCone
