= Danse Macabre (Efteling) =

Haunted house attraction at Efteling, Netherlands

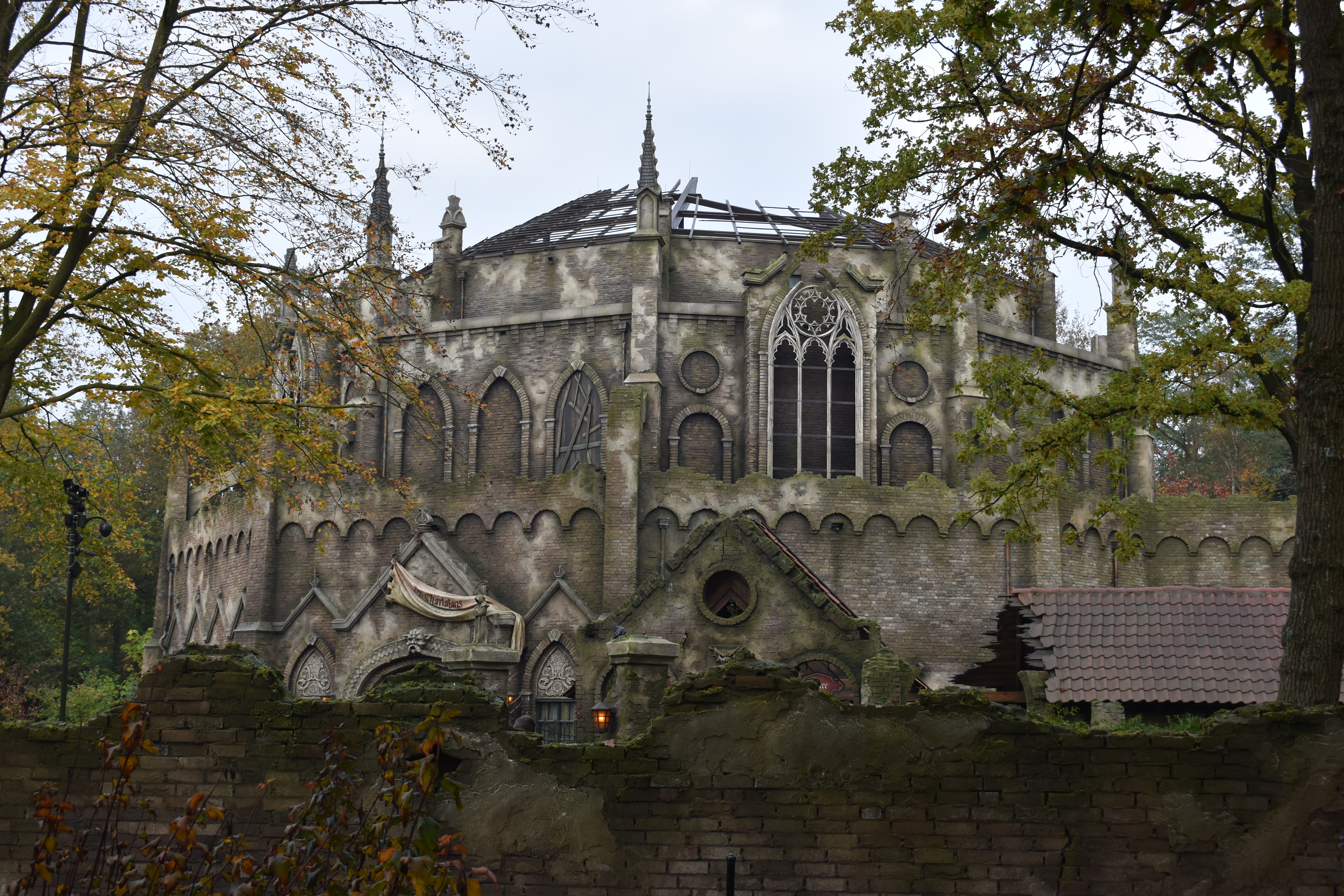
- Exterior of the ride building (2024) Danse macabre Colonne Orchestra, Louis Fourestier conducting (1953)

Efteling
- Area: Anderrijk
- Status: Operating
- Cost: €35 million
- Opening date: October 31, 2024
- Replaced: Spookslot

Ride statistics
- Attraction type: Dark ride
- Manufacturer: Intamin
- Designer: Efteling
- Model: Dynamic Motion Stage
- Theme: Horror
- Music: Danse macabre
- Height: 20 m (66 ft)
- Drop: 3 m (9.8 ft)
- Site area: 17,000 m^{2} (180,000 sq ft)
- Capacity: 1250 riders per hour
- Vehicle type: Choir stalls
- Vehicles: 6
- Riders per vehicle: 18 (108 per ride)
- Rows: 3
- Riders per row: 6
- Duration: 3:30
- Height restriction: 120 cm (3 ft 11 in)
- Single rider line available
- Must transfer from wheelchair

Danse Macabre is a haunted house dark ride at the Efteling amusement park in the Netherlands. The attraction is named after Danse macabre, an 1874 symphonic poem by French composer Camille Saint-Saëns, whose music is used as the central theme of the ride. It opened on 31 October 2024 on the former site of Spookslot (1978–2022), which was a walk through experience.

Danse Macabre is the first attraction to use Intamin’s Dynamic Motion Stage, a ride system with a rotating platform that moves riders in multiple directions. The attraction, set within the ruins of a Gothic abbey and the Huyverwoud forest, includes special effects and an original orchestral arrangement. The development of the ride and surrounding environment cost approximately €35 million.

== Background and development ==
In January 2022, Efteling announced plans for a major expansion, including a new themed area (around 17,000 m²) and a large attraction to replace the aging Spookslot haunted castle. In 2022, following the deterioration of Spookslot (an early haunted attraction at Efteling that opened in 1978), the park’s management decided to close it and create a new area with a modern indoor attraction that would honour the original’s attractions legacy. Spookslot’s final day of operation was on the 4th of September 2022, the structure was then demolished to clear the site.

On 17 May 2022, Efteling announced that the upcoming ride would be called Danse Macabre, named after the symphonic poem featured in the previous attraction. The new area around the ride was designed as a foreboding forest and abandoned abbey setting, with a 20 meters tall show building as the focal point. Efteling’s creative team, led by designer Jeroen Verheij, drew inspiration from early concept art and unused ideas from Spookslot’s original design.

Initial details about the ride system were kept secret during early develpment, On 31 October 2022, Efteling confirmed in a Making-of preview that it had partnered with Intamin to develop a custom ride system for Danse Macabre. According to Efteling, the design team evaluated existing ride systems but decided that none met their creative and technical requirements. As a result, the park commissioned Intamin to develop a new system. Intamin branded this as the Dynamic Motion Stage, describing it as a hybrid between a dynamic show and a thrill ride. This approach was compared to Efteling's collaboration with Vekoma in the 1990s, which led to the development of the first Madhouse attraction, Villa Volta.

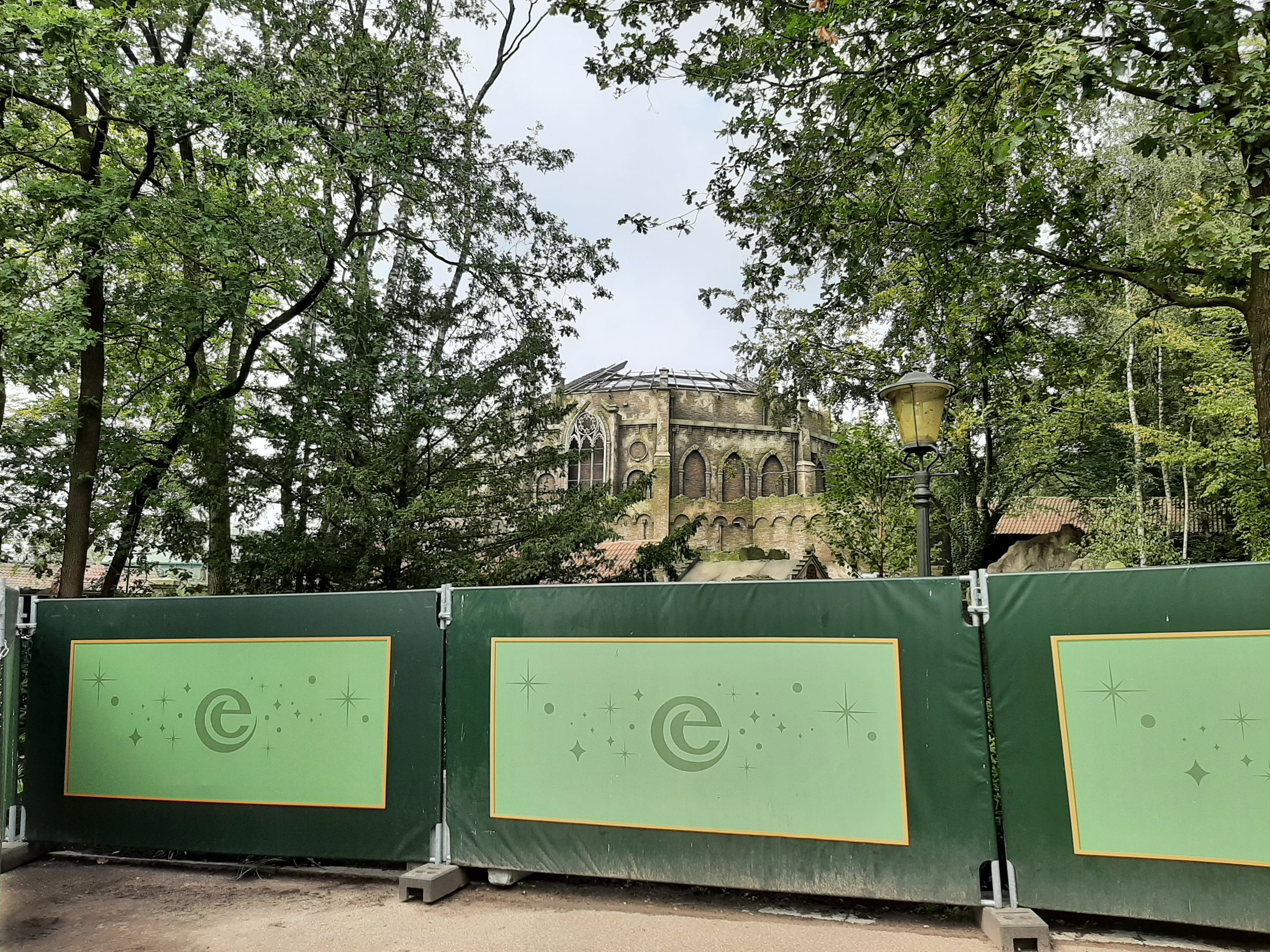
Danse Macabre in final stages of construction (2024)

Construction began in 2023 and finished in 2024. Efteling produced a series of behind-the-scenes videos titled Making-of: Danse Macabre, documenting aspects of the design and build. By mid-2024, the exterior of the attraction, a decayed Gothic abbey, was completed, and the majority of the ride components were installed inside. During construction, the creative team visited several abbeys in Belgium for architectural reference. On 15 July 2024, Efteling announced that Danse Macabre would officially open on Halloween, and began offering public previews. A press preview was held on the 30th of October 2024, followed by the official public opening on 31 October 2024.

== Theming and design ==
Huyverwoud (English: "Shiverwood"), the themed zone for Danse Macabre, is the first area at Efteling built entirely around a single attraction. Covering approximately 1.7 hectares, the area is presented as a forest surrounding the ruins of a 14th-century abbey. Visitors enter through an abbey square (Abdijplein), under a Gothic archway and ruined walls.

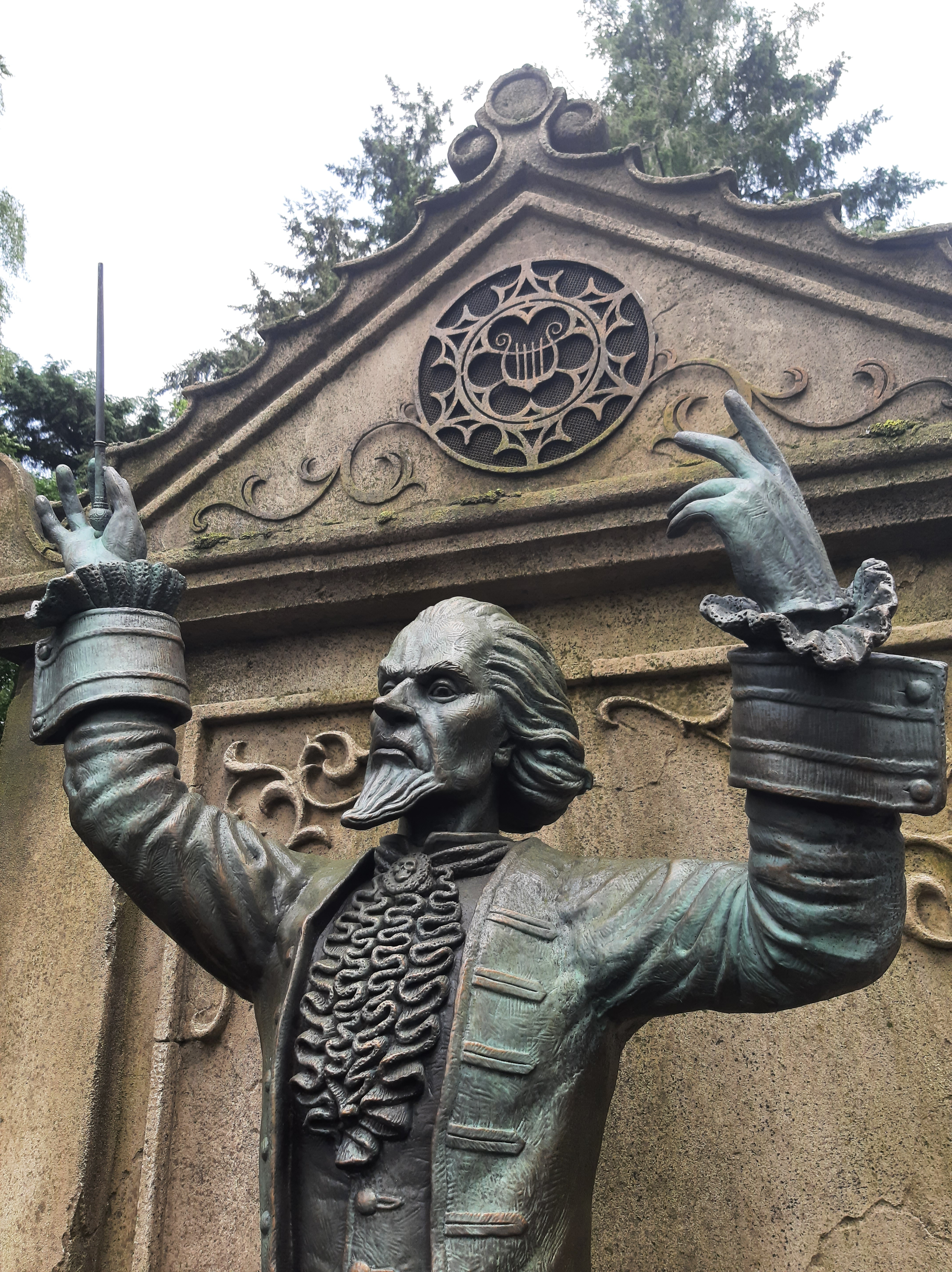
Statue of the conductor in the graveyard section of the queue

The queue line passes through cloisters, a herb garden, a graveyard, and a foggy forest path before reaching the entrance of the main show building.

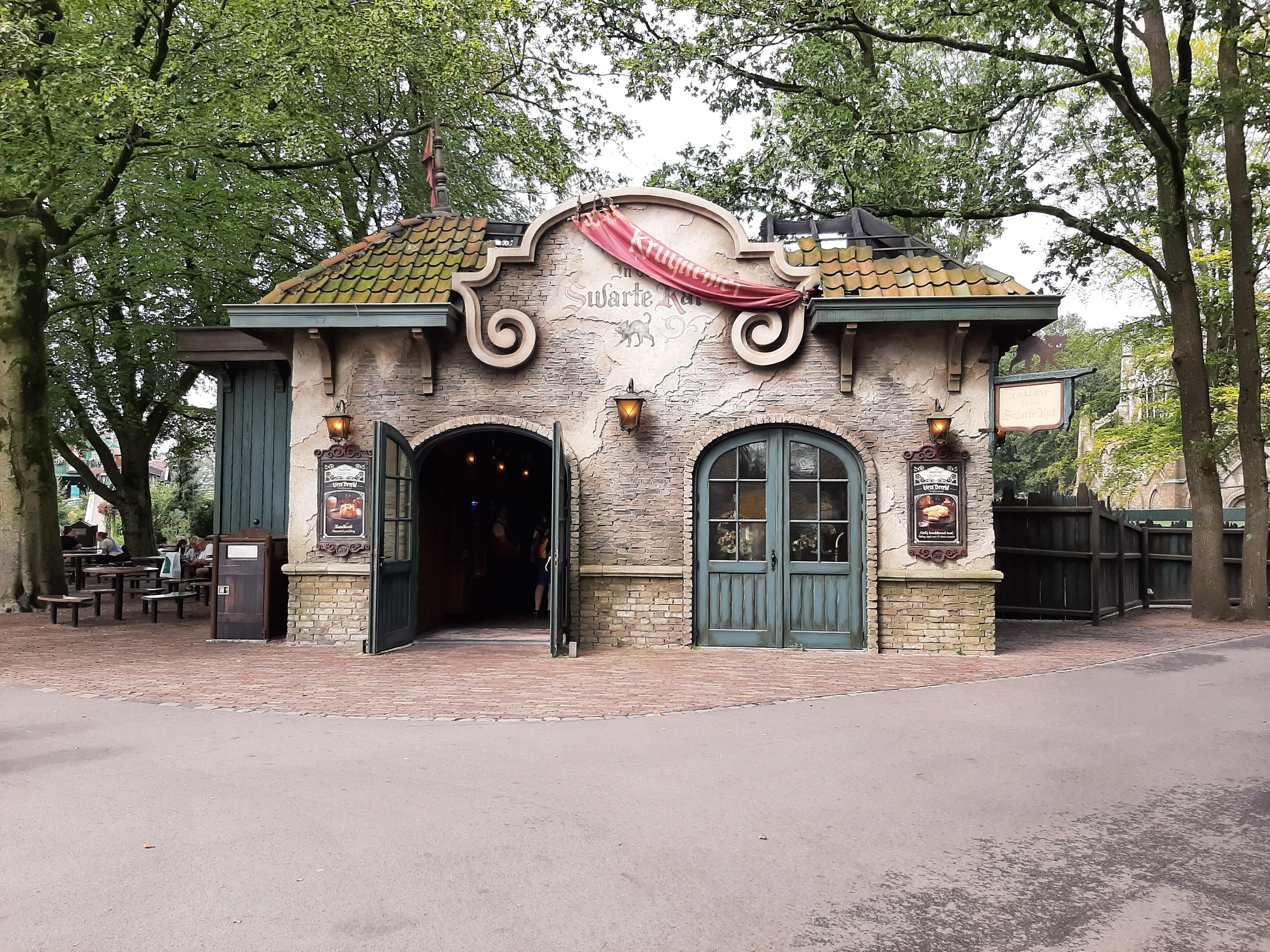
In den Swarte Kat eatery

The Huyverwoud zone includes themed amenities and entertainment supporting the attraction’s storyline. Members of the fictional Charlatan family appear throughout the day to interact with visitors. An enchanted barrel organ named Esmeralda provides live performances, introducing guests to the story of the cursed orchestra.

The ride’s show building, named the "Abdij van Huyverwoud" (Abbey of Huyverwoud), is a Gothic abbey structure approximately 20 metres (66 ft) tall. The facade mimics medieval Gothic design in a ruined state, with collapsed roofs and cracked walls intended to suggest a past catastrophe.

== Reception ==
Upon opening in late 2024, the attraction received positive reviews for its theming and incorporation of elements from the former Spookslot attraction. Reviewers described the main ride experience as more of a “haunted spectacle” than a high-thrill ride. The Dynamic Motion Stage was noted for its fluid movements, creating the sensation of gliding and dancing in sync with the music, rather than delivering extreme thrills.

Critics highlighted that Danse Macabre successfully recreated the spirit of Spookslot for a new generation. Several original props from Spookslot were included in the theming as a nod to spookslot. In early 2025, Danse Macabre received the FKF Award for Best Park Innovation from the Freundeskreis Kirmes und frietzparks. In 2024, the In den Swarte Kat eatery received the Park World Excellence Award for ‘Best Food or Retail Development’.

== See also ==
- De Vliegende Hollander
- Phantom Manor
