= Adolph Bolm =

Russian-born American ballet dancer (1884–1951)

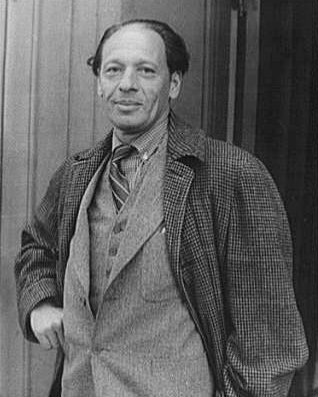
- Bolm in 1937
- Born: Adolph Rudolphovich Bolm; 25 September 1884; Saint Petersburg, Russia
- Died: 16 April 1951 (aged 66); Los Angeles, US
- Occupations: Ballet dancer; choreographer

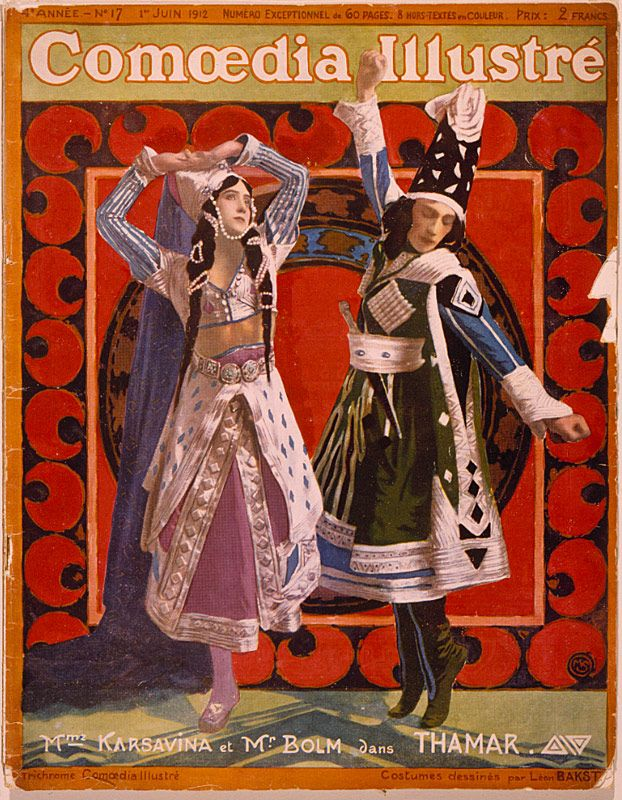
Karsavina and Bolm in "Thamar", 1912

Adolph Rudolphovich Bolm (Russian: Адольф Рудольфович Больм; September 25, 1884 – April 16, 1951) was a Russian-born American ballet dancer and choreographer, of German descent.

== Biography ==
Adolph Bolm was born on September 15, 1884, in Saint Petersburg. He was a son of the first violin and assistant conductor of the Mikhailovsky Theatre. Bolm graduated from the Russian Imperial Ballet School in Saint Petersburg in 1904; his teacher was Platon Karsavin. That same year he became a dancer with Mariinsky Ballet. In 1908 and 1909, he ran a European tour with Anna Pavlova.

He then collaborated with Diaghilev's Ballets Russes in Paris, along with several other dancers from Mariinsky. In 1917, during the second part of a two-part American tour by the Ballets Russes (without Diaghilev, but with Nijinsky), Bolm was injured during the ballet Thamar. The injury was serious, and he was taken to the hospital for a long time and left the tour to stay in the United States. In 1917 he also provided instruction to the young ballerina Ruth Page. He went on to organize Ballet Intime in New York and choreographed for the New York Metropolitan Opera. Bolm and dancer Ruth Page appeared together in an experimental dance film Danse Macabre (1922) directed by Dudley Murphy.

In 1919 he moved to Chicago, which served as his base from which he taught widely across the country. In 1919, Bolm staged The Birthday of the Infanta, his first large ballet for the Chicago Opera Company, with music by John Alden Carpenter, and danced by Bolm and Ruth Page. Bolm’s complete Infanta ballet has not been a part of a known ballet repertoire since then. However, two scenes of The Birthday of the Infanta were performed by The Chicago Opera at Chicago’s Auditorium Theater on January 14, 1922, followed by several performances at the Manhattan Opera House in New York City. In these two scenes, sixteen-year-old ballerina Betty Felsen danced as the Infanta, Serge Oukrainsky danced as the dwarf, and Andreus Pavley danced as a Gypsy leader, as described in the February 3 New York Globe review.

From 1921 to 1923, for example, he was invited by Nellie Cornish to direct the summer intensive program in dance at The Cornish School (now Cornish College of the Arts) in Seattle. There he produced original works, such as The Gargoyles of Notre Dame in 1922. No fewer than three of his students and dancers headed the program at the school from the 1910s to the 1950s: Mary Ann Wells, Caird Leslie, and Lee Foley.

In 1929, Bolm moved to California. In 1933, following the opening of the War Memorial Opera House, the San Francisco Opera established the San Francisco Opera Ballet (SFOB) under Bolm's direction as the ballet master. On June 2, 1933, even before he produces dances for operas, SFOB begins presenting independent, all-dance programs.

Bolm continued to work in California and New York through 1947. He was one of the five choreographers involved in the 1940 founding season for New York's Ballet Theatre. His last appearance on stage was in 1943, as the Moor in Petrushka at the Hollywood Bowl with the Ballet Theatre. His last choreography was for San Francisco Ballet (the successor to SFOB): "Mephisto" in 1947, from Mephisto Waltzes by Franz Liszt (revived in 1948). He died on April 16, 1951, in Los Angeles.

== See also ==
- Chamber ballet
- List of Russian ballet dancers

== Sources ==
- Craine, Debra; Mackrell, Judith (1 January 2010). "Bolm, Adolph". The Oxford Dictionary of Dance. Oxford University Press. ISBN 978-0-19-956344-9.
- Garafola, Lynn (1998). "Bolm, Adolph". The International Encyclopedia of Dance. Oxford University Press. ISBN 978-0-19-517369-7.
