= Winifred Haun & Dancers =

General information
- Year founded: 1991; 35 years ago
- Founding artistic director: Winifred Haun
- Location: 228 S. East Ave. Oak Park, IL 60302-3212
- Website: www.winifredhaun.org

Winifred Haun & Dancers is a dance company based in Chicago and Oak Park, Illinois.

== History ==
Choreographer and dancer Winifred Haun established Winifred Haun & Dancers in Chicago in 1991. In 2001, the company went on hiatus for five years while Winifred Haun pursued solo projects and residency opportunities.

The company's mission is to create and present contemporary dance works that feature diverse artists and engage with social issues. The company has a long history of commitment to equity, diversity, and inclusion, and Haun set out to focus on social justice and civil rights activism when she established the company, inspired in part by the work of her father, Declan Haun, a civil rights photojournalist.

The company's choreography has evolved over time from primarily small, community-based performances to larger scale, evening-length works. The works Haun choreographs for the company draw on a variety of influences, ranging from works that engage with broad themes such as politics, war, and womanhood to works inspired by the movements of Haun's infant daughter and the interactions of guests at a party.

Winifred Haun & Dancers has sought to present performances in both professional and non-traditional venues. They have performed at the Danspace Project at St. Mark's Church in New York City, at Frank Lloyd Wright's Unity Temple in Oak Park, in two Dance for Life events at the Pritzker Pavilion in 2021 and the Auditorium Theatre in 2024, and at many other locations and events. As of August 2020, the company had created and presented more than 125 original dance works since its founding.

== Honors and awards ==
In 2000, the company received the Ruth Page Award for "Outstanding Contribution to Dance in Chicago" for creating Chicago’s NEXT Dance Festival in 1994, a dance festival featuring new work by Chicago-area artists. The company has also received the Oak Park Area Arts Council’s “Best in Class” Award in 2014 and Critic's Choice awards from the Chicago Reader and TimeOut Chicago. The company won a MacArthur Foundation grant in 2015. In 2022, artistic director Winifred Haun won the prestigious 3Arts Award for her choreography and leadership in the dance field.
