= Dance of Death (disambiguation) =

Dance of Death, also called Danse Macabre, is a late-medieval allegory of the universality of death.

Dance of Death or The Dance of Death may also refer to:

== Books ==
- Dance of Death, a 1938 novel by Helen McCloy
- Dance of Death (Stine novel), a 1997 novel by R. L. Stine
- Dance of Death (novel), a 2005 novel by Douglas Preston and Lincoln Child

== Theatre and film ==
- The Dance of Death (Strindberg play), a 1900 play by August Strindberg
- The Dance of Death, a 1908 play by Frank Wedekind
- The Dance of Death (Auden play), a 1933 play by W. H. Auden

=== Film ===
- The Death Dance, a 1918 drama starring Alice Brady
- The Dance of Death (1912 film), a German silent film
- The Dance of Death (1919 film), an Austrian silent film
- The Dance of Death (1938 film), crime drama starring Vesta Victoria; screenplay by Ralph Dawson
- The Dance of Death (1942 film), Hungarian film directed by László Kalmár
- The Dance of Death (1948 film), French-Italian drama based on Strindberg's play, starring Erich von Stroheim
- The Dance of Death (1967 film), a West German drama film
- Dance of Death or House of Evil, 1968 Mexican horror film starring Boris Karloff
- Dance of Death (1969 film), a film based on Strindberg's play, starring Laurence Olivier
- Dance of Death (1979 film), a Hong Kong film featuring Paul Chun

== Music ==
- Dance of Death (album), a 2003 album by Iron Maiden, or the title song
- The Dance of Death & Other Plantation Favorites, a 1964 album by John Fahey
- The Dance of Death (Scaramanga Six album)
- "Death Dance", a 2016 song by Sevendust
- "The Dead Dance", a 2025 song by Lady Gaga

== See also ==
- Dance of the Dead (disambiguation)
- Danse Macabre (disambiguation)
- Bon Odori, a Japanese traditional dance welcoming the spirits of the dead
- La danse des morts, an oratorio by Arthur Honegger
- Totentanz (disambiguation)
