= Danse macabre (Saint-Saëns) =

1874 tone poem by Camille Saint-Saëns

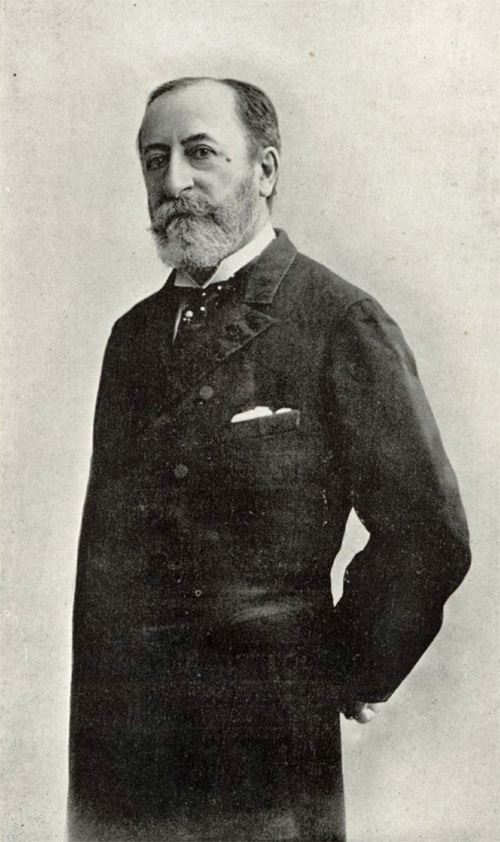
Saint-Saëns c. 1880

Danse macabre, Op. 40, is a symphonic poem for orchestra, written in 1874 by the French composer Camille Saint-Saëns. It premiered 24 January 1875. It is in the key of G minor. It started out in 1872 as an art song for voice and piano with a French text by the poet Henri Cazalis. In 1874, the composer expanded and reworked the piece into a symphonic poem, replacing the vocal line with a solo violin part.

== Analysis ==
Danse macabre
Colonne Orchestra, Louis Fourestier conducting (1953)

According to legend, Death appears at midnight every year on Halloween. Death calls forth the dead from their graves to dance for him while he plays his fiddle (here represented by a solo violin). His skeletons dance for him until the cockerel crows at dawn, when they must return to their graves until the next year.

The piece opens with a harp playing a single note, D, twelve times (the twelve strokes of midnight) which is accompanied by soft chords from the string section. The solo violin enters playing the tritone, which was known as the diabolus in musica ("the Devil in music") during the Medieval and Baroque eras, consisting of an A and an E♭—in an example of scordatura tuning, the violinist's E string has actually been tuned down to an E♭ to create the dissonant tritone.

The first theme is heard on a solo flute, followed by the second theme, a descending scale on the solo violin which is accompanied by soft chords from the string section. The first and second themes, or fragments of them, are then heard throughout the various sections of the orchestra. The piece becomes more energetic and at its midpoint, right after a contrapuntal section based on the second theme, there is a direct quote played by the woodwinds of Dies irae, a Gregorian chant from the Requiem that is melodically related to the work's second theme. The Dies irae is presented unusually in a major key. After this section the piece returns to the first and second themes and climaxes with the full orchestra playing very strong dynamics. Then there is an abrupt break in the texture and the coda represents the dawn breaking (a cockerel's crow, played by the oboe) and the skeletons returning to their graves.

The piece makes particular use of the xylophone to imitate the sounds of rattling bones. Saint-Saëns uses a similar motif in the Fossils movement of The Carnival of the Animals.

The progression and melody of the minor waltz are similar to the jibes (e.g. "their sweethearts all are dead") of the Sailors' Chorus in "Helmsman/Steersman, Leave Your Watch", which begins the third act of Richard Wagner's earlier opera, The Flying Dutchman.

== Instrumentation ==
Danse macabre is scored for an obbligato violin and an orchestra consisting of strings, one piccolo, two flutes, two oboes, two clarinets in B♭, two bassoons; four horns in G and D, two trumpets in D, three trombones, one tuba; a percussion section that includes timpani, xylophone, bass drum, cymbals and triangle; and one harp.

== Reception ==
When Danse macabre was first performed on 24 January 1875, it was not well received and caused widespread feelings of anxiety. The 21st-century scholar Roger Nichols mentions adverse reaction to "the deformed Dies irae plainsong", the "horrible screeching from solo violin", the use of a xylophone, and "the hypnotic repetitions", in which Nichols hears a pre-echo of Ravel's Boléro.

It has grown to be considered one of Saint-Saëns' masterpieces, widely regarded and reproduced in both high and popular culture.

== Transcriptions ==
Shortly after the premiere, the piece was transcribed into a piano solo arrangement by Franz Liszt (S.555), a good friend of Saint-Saëns. Next to countless other piano solo transcriptions, Ernest Guiraud wrote a version for piano four hands and Saint-Saëns himself wrote a version for two pianos, and in 1877 also a version for violin and piano. In 1942, Vladimir Horowitz made extensive changes to the Liszt transcription. This version is played most often today.

There is an arrangement for Pierrot ensemble (flute, clarinet, violin, cello, piano) by Tim Mulleman, and an organ transcription by Edwin Lemare. Greg Anderson created a version for two pianos, two percussionists and violin, which he titled Danse Macabre Bacchanale.

== Usage ==
Danse macabre is featured in Henrik Ibsen's 1896 play John Gabriel Borkman and the 1922 short film Danse Macabre by Dudley Murphy. The piece was used in dance performances, including those of Natalia Vladimirovna Trouhanowa in June 1911 and later by Anna Pavlova (1881–1931). It is also used in the Danse Macabre dark ride at the Dutch theme park Efteling. A variation has also been used as the title tune of British TV show Jonathan Creek. A cover of the piece appears in the game Mewgenics during the game's third act during the stage ''The End,'' called "We're Dead". The piece also appears as a cover in the video game Ultrakill.
